= List of places of worship in Hindmarsh Shire =

This is a list of places of worship in the Shire of Hindmarsh, a local government area in the state of Victoria, Australia. The list includes active and former churches and other religious buildings representing a variety of Christian denominations and other faiths.

St Peter's Anglican Church, Dimboola

== Heritage listing status ==
Style	Status
Yes	Listed on the Victorian Heritage Register
–	Not listed

== Current places of worship ==
Current places of worship
Name	Image	Location	Denomination/ Affiliation	Heritage listing	Notes	Refs
Nhill Uniting Church		Nhill; 36.335245°S 141.648647°E	Uniting (formerly Methodist)	–		
St Paul's Lutheran Church		Nhill; 36.335641°S 141.658211°E	Lutheran	–		
Nhill K'Nyaw Baptist Church (formerly Nhill Christian Fellowship)		Nhill; 36.334600°S 141.672936°E	Baptist (formerly non-denominational)	–		
St Andrew's Presbyterian Church, Nhill		Nhill; 36.334762°S 141.652891°E	Presbyterian	–		
St George's Anglican Church, Nhill		Nhill; 36.334998°S 141.651034°E	Anglican	–		
St Patrick's Catholic Church, Nhill		Nhill; 36.335702°S 141.642165°E	Catholic	–		
St Andrew's Uniting Church		Dimboola; 36.451006°S 142.026205°E	Uniting (formerly Presbyterian)	–		
St Joseph's Catholic Church, Dimboola		Dimboola; 36.450654°S 142.028826°E	Catholic	–		
St Peter's Lutheran Church, Dimboola		Dimboola; 36.456645°S 142.036737°E	Lutheran	–		
St Peter's Anglican Church, Dimboola		Dimboola; 36.452232°S 142.029051°E	Anglican	–		
Rainbow Baptist–Uniting Church		Rainbow; 35.899411°S 141.995655°E	Baptist & Uniting (formerly Methodist)	–		
St Mary's Catholic Church, Rainbow		Rainbow; 35.898866°S 141.990880°E	Catholic	–		
St Paul's Anglican Church, Rainbow		Rainbow; 35.900438°S 141.995174°E	Anglican	–		
St Stephen's Lutheran Church		Rainbow; 35.894782°S 141.993976°E	Rainbow	–		
St John's Lutheran Church (Pella Lutheran Church)		Rainbow; 35.862369°S 141.900003°E	Lutheran	Yes		
St Andrew's Uniting Church, Jeparit		Jeparit; 36.139298°S 141.982919°E	Uniting (formerly Presbyterian)	–		
St John's Lutheran Church, Jeparit		Jeparit; 36.143321°S 141.985129°E	Lutheran	–		
Broughton Corps		Broughton; 36.166920°S 141.352369°E	Salvation Army	–		
Harvest Church, Nhill		Nhill; 36.334116°S 141.652448°E	Pentecostal			
Nhill Seventh-day Adventist Church		Nhill; 36.333204°S 141.663116°E	Seventh-day Adventist Church			

== Former places of worship ==
Former places of worship
Name	Image	Location	Denomination/ Affiliation	Heritage listing	Notes	Refs
St Paul's Lutheran Church, Glenlee		Glenlee; 36.269605°S 141.785713°E	Lutheran	–		
Ebenezer Moravian Mission (Lake Hindmarsh Aboriginal Mission)		Dimboola; 36.315311°S 141.987358°E	Moravian	Yes		
Antwerp Methodist Church		Antwerp; 36.296690°S 142.027629°E	Methodist	–		
Rainbow Baptist Church (old)		Rainbow; 35.898958°S 141.997433°E	Baptist	–		
Rainbow Presbyterian Church		Rainbow; 35.898349°S 141.997434°E	Presbyterian	–		
Brentwood Baptist Church		Rainbow; 35.968448°S 142.167477°E	Baptist	Non-existent		
St Augustine's Catholic Church		Jeparit; 36.142121°S 141.984416°E	Catholic	–		
Peppers Plains Baptist Church		Jeparit; 36.155538°S 142.144903°E	Baptist	–		
Tullyvea Methodist Church		Jeparit; 36.207446°S 141.937697°E	Methodist	–		
Holy Trinity Anglican Church		Jeparit; 36.143629°S 141.985355°E	Anglican	Non-existent		
Netherby Catholic Church		Netherby; 36.107427°S 141.649833°E	Catholic	–		
Netherby Methodist Church		Netherby; 36.107534°S 141.650931°E	Methodist	–		
St David's Anglican Church		Netherby; 36.107779°S 141.650895°E	Anglican	–		
Bethlehem Lutheran Church		Netherby; 36.108110°S 141.650382°E	Lutheran	–		
Crymelon Baptist Church		Kenmare; 35.914428°S 142.167818°E	Baptist	Non-existent		
Gerang Gerung Uniting Church		Gerang Gerung; 36.370778°S 141.884260°E	Uniting (formerly Methodist (Bible Christian))	–		
Kiata Uniting Church		Kiata; 36.363952°S 141.792465°E	Uniting (formerly Methodist)	–		
Lorquon Uniting Church		Lorquon; 36.151762°S 141.758781°E	Uniting (formerly Methodist)	–		
Yanac Uniting Church		Yanac; 36.136021°S 141.437043°E	Uniting (formerly Methodist)	Non-existent		
Broughton Uniting Church		Broughton; 36.167326°S 141.352324°E	Uniting (formerly Methodist)	Non-existent		
Woorak West Methodist Church		Jeparit; 36.146357°S 141.991710°E	Methodist	–	Relocated from Woorak West to Jeparit Museum	
Ni Ni Well Lutheran Church		Glenlee; 36.216778°S 141.774822°E	Lutheran	–		

== See also ==
- List of places of worship in Golden Plains Shire
- List of places of worship in Southern Grampians Shire
- List of places of worship in the City of Greater Geelong
