= List of places on the Victorian Heritage Register in the Shire of Hindmarsh =

This is a list of places on the Victorian Heritage Register in the Shire of Hindmarsh in Victoria, Australia. The Victorian Heritage Register is maintained by the Heritage Council of Victoria.

The Victorian Heritage Register, as of 2021, lists the following four state-registered places within the Shire of Hindmarsh:

| Place name | Place # | Location | Suburb or Town | Co-ordinates | Built | State registered | Photo |
|---|---|---|---|---|---|---|---|
| Ebenezer Mission | H0288 | Ebenezer Mission Road | Dimboola | 36.315350°S 141.988350°E | 1859 | 9 October 1974 | |
| Soldiers' and Citizens' Memorial Hall and Former Municipal Chambers | H1905 | 10-12 Roy Street | Jeparit | 36.143390°S 141.987670°E | 1924-25 | 14 December 2000 | |
| Stasinowsky's Lime Kiln | H1959 | Pella Church Road | Rainbow | 35.857820°S 141.890040°E | c. 1914 | 11 October 2001 | |
| Yurunga | H0598 | 1 Gray Street | Rainbow | 35.891900°S 141.993500°E | 1909-10 | 21 August 1985 | |
