= Little Desert, Victoria =

Little Desert Victoria
- Coordinates: 36.4937078°S 141.7522486°E
- Population: 5 (2016 census)
- Established: 1998
- Postcode(s): 3418
- Time zone: AEST (UTC+10)
  - Summer (DST): AEDT (UTC+11)
- Location: 333 km (207 mi) north-west of Melbourne; 17 km (11 mi) south of Nhill
- LGA(s): Shire of Hindmarsh
Mean max temp	Mean min temp	Annual rainfall
22.5 °C; 73 °F	8.7 °C; 48 °F	327.1 mm 12.9 in
Localities around Little Desert:
Lawloit	Nhill; Kiata; Gerang Gerang; Dimboola	Dimboola
Lawloit; Peronne	Little Desert	Wail
Peronne	Goroke; Nurcoung; Duchembegarra	Pimpinio
- Footnotes: Coordinates; Locations; Climate; Adjoining localities

Little Desert is a locality in the Australian state of Victoria located about 333 kilometres (207 mi) north-west of the state capital of Melbourne and about 17 kilometres (11 mi) south of the municipal seat of Nhill. At the 2016 census, Little Desert had a population of 5. The locality's name and extent was registered on 23 July 1998. The principal land use is conservation with the majority of the locality being occupied by the Little Desert National Park.

== See also ==
- Big Desert, Victoria
