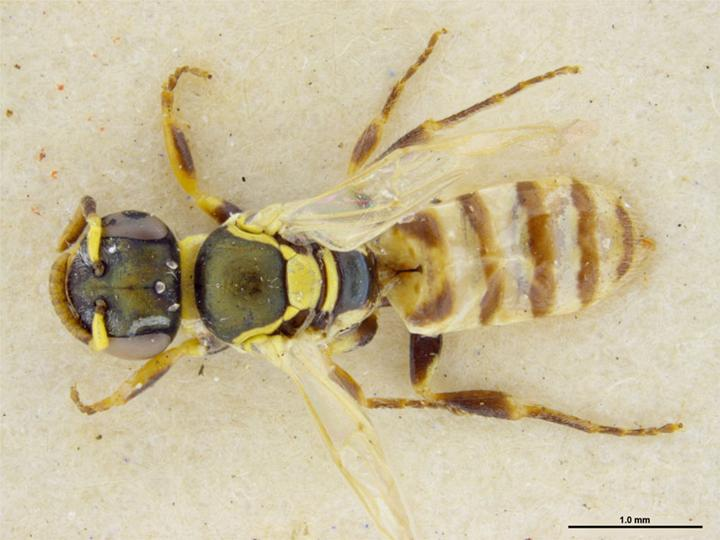
- Female

Scientific classification
- Kingdom: Animalia
- Phylum: Arthropoda
- Clade: Pancrustacea
- Class: Insecta
- Order: Hymenoptera
- Family: Colletidae
- Genus: Euhesma
- Species: E. australis

Binomial name
- Euhesma australis (Michener, 1965)

Synonyms
- Euryglossa (Euhesma) australis Michener, 1965

= Euhesma australis =

Species of bee

Euhesma australis, or Euhesma (Euhesma) australis, is a species of bee in the family Colletidae and the subfamily Euryglossinae. It is endemic to Australia. It was described in 1965 by American entomologist Charles Duncan Michener.

== Distribution and habitat ==
The species occurs in inland south-eastern Australia. The type locality is Ooldea, South Australia. It has also been recorded from Karronda and Peebinga in the Murray Mallee region, as well as from the Little Desert, Victoria.

== Behaviour ==
The adults are flying mellivores.
