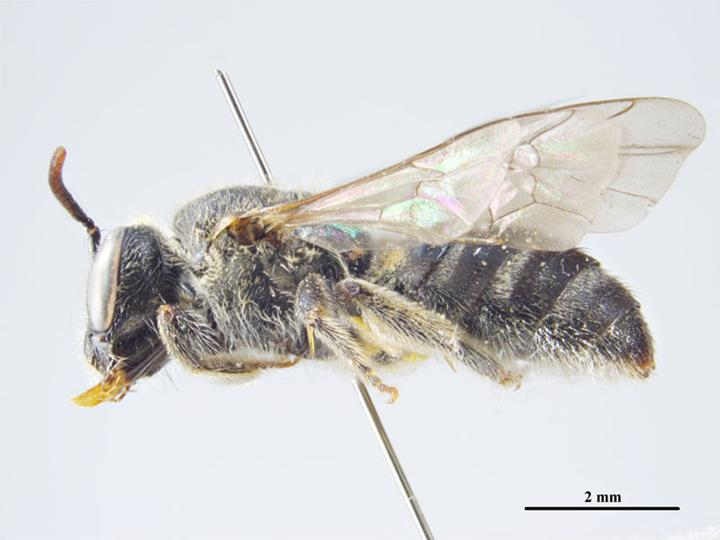
- Female

Scientific classification
- Kingdom: Animalia
- Phylum: Arthropoda
- Clade: Pancrustacea
- Class: Insecta
- Order: Hymenoptera
- Family: Halictidae
- Genus: Lasioglossum
- Species: L. oblitum

Binomial name
- Lasioglossum oblitum Smith, 1879

Synonyms
- Halictus oblitus Smith, 1879

= Lasioglossum oblitum =

Species of bee

Lasioglossum oblitum, or Lasioglossum (Chilalictus) oblitum, is a species of bee in the family Halictidae and subfamily Halictinae. It is endemic to Australia. It was described by English entomologist Frederick Smith in 1879.

== Distribution and habitat ==
The species occurs in both western and south-eastern Australia. The type locality is Swan River (Perth). It has also been recorded from Kiata in north-western Victoria.

== Behaviour ==
The adults are flying mellivores. Flowering plants visited by the bees include Eremophila and Eucalyptus species.
