= Albacutya =

- Town
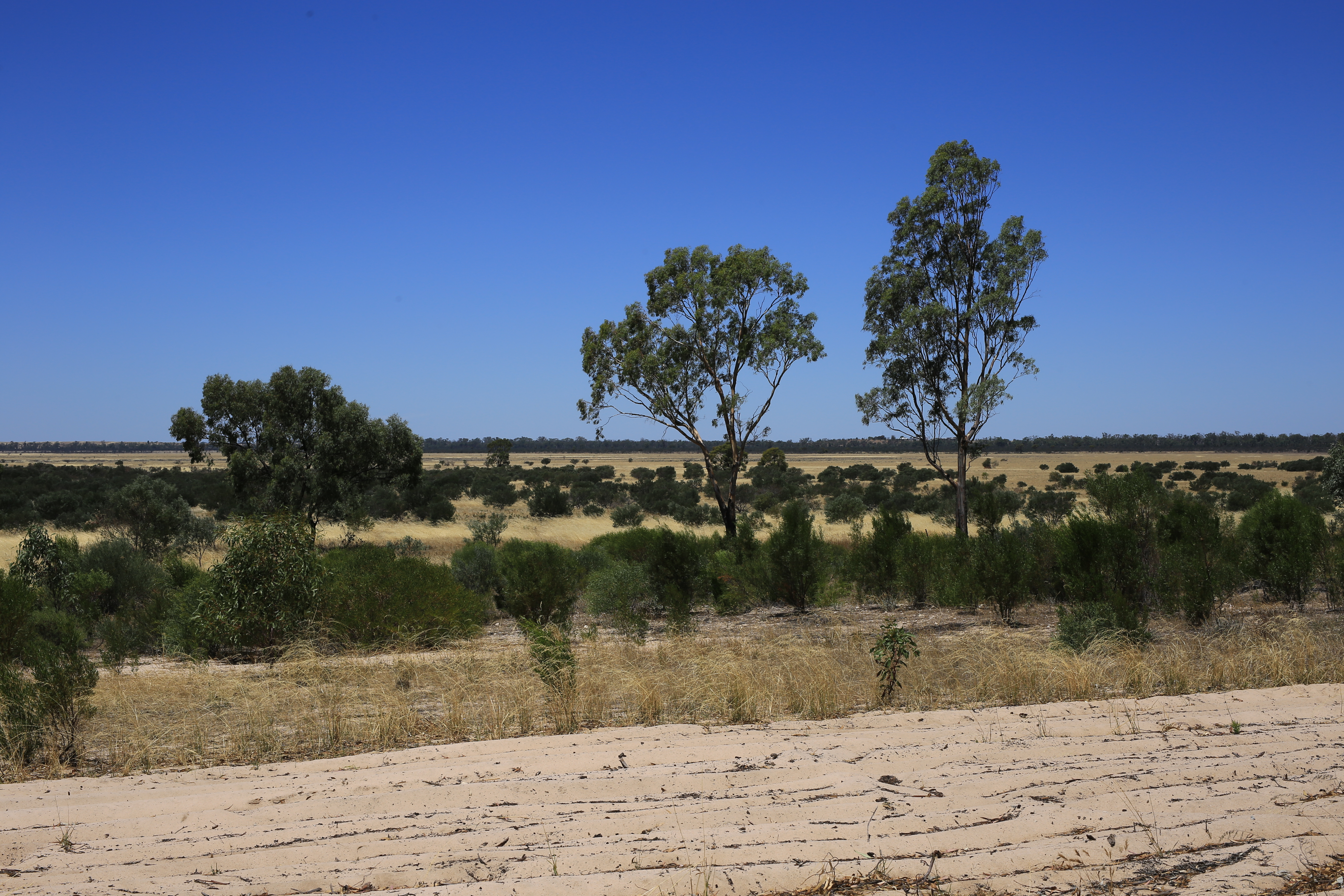
- Lake Albacutya Park, January 2017

- Coordinates: 35°45′9″S 141°56′59″E
- Country: Australia
- State: Victoria
- LGA: Shire of Hindmarsh
- Location: 353 km (219 mi) NW of Melbourne; 105 km (65 mi) NW of Horsham; 70 km (43 mi) N of Nhill; 146 km (91 mi) W of Bendigo

Government
  - State electorate: Lowan
  - Federal division: Mallee

Population
  - Total: 0 (2021 census)
- Postcode: 3424

Albacutya is a locality in the Shire of Hindmarsh, Victoria, Australia. The locality surrounds the shores of Lake Albacutya. At the 2021 census, Albacutya had a population of 0.

The name is derived from the Wergaia word for Lake Albacatya "Ngelbakutya". Albacatya is one of many places located on the Wimmera Mallee Silo Art Trail with Silo art created in 2021 by Kitt Bennett.
