= Yanac railway line =

Former railway line in Victoria, Australia

Yanac

Overview
- Status: closed, track removed
- Owner: VicTrack
- Termini: Jeparit; Yanac
- Connecting lines: Yaapeet
- Stations: 5

History
- Opened: 10 December 1912
- Closed: 8 December 1986

The Yanac railway line was a railway line in Victoria, Australia, branching off of the Yaapeet railway line at Jeparit station. It was opened in two stages: from Jeparit to Lorquon on December 10, 1912, and Lorquon to Yanac in 1916. It was closed in late 1986.

== History ==
The line was first opened only to Lorquon, but work on the extension to Yanac began in 1915 and was finished in 1916, with the first trains running in June. Between 1938 and 1939, bulk grain silos were provided at all stations . The last passenger service to Yanac ran sometime in the 1950s. The line was officially closed in 1986.

== Line Guide ==
Branched from Yaapeet railway line at Jeparit station

Detpa

Lorquon

Netherby

Yanac
