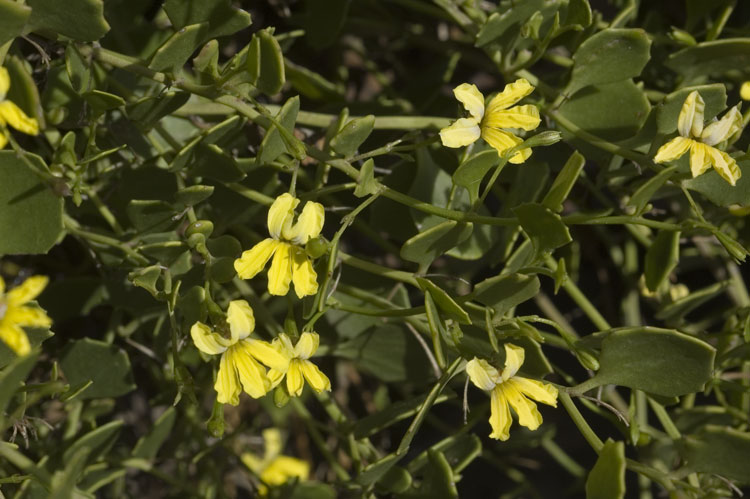

Scientific classification
- Kingdom: Plantae
- Clade: Tracheophytes
- Clade: Angiosperms
- Clade: Eudicots
- Clade: Asterids
- Order: Asterales
- Family: Goodeniaceae
- Genus: Goodenia
- Species: G. varia

Binomial name
- Goodenia varia R.Br.

= Goodenia varia =

Sticky goodenia

Species of flowering plant

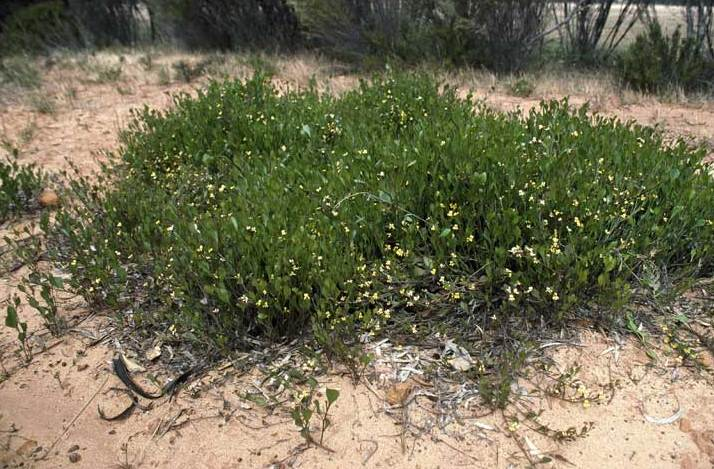
Habit near Kiata

Goodenia varia, commonly known as sticky goodenia, is a species of flowering plant in the family Goodeniaceae and is endemic to southern Australia. It is an ascending to prostrate shrub with elliptic leaves, usually with toothed edges, and racemes or thyrses of yellow flowers.

== Description ==
Goodenia varia is an ascending to prostrate shrub that typically grows to a height of 1.0 m (3 ft 3 in) and is usually sticky when young. The leaves are arranged along the stems and are elliptic to more or less round, usually with teeth on the edges, 20–40 mm (0.79–1.57 in) long, 10–20 mm (0.39–0.79 in) wide on a petiole up to 5 mm (0.20 in) long. The flowers are arranged in racemes or thyrses up to 150 mm (5.9 in) long with on a peduncle up to 10 mm (0.39 in) long, with leaf-like bracts and triangular bracteoles 1 mm (0.039 in) long, each flower on a pedicel up to 3 mm (0.12 in) long. The sepals are linear, 2–3.5 mm (0.079–0.138 in) long and the corolla is yellow, 8–18 mm (0.31–0.71 in) long. The lower lobes of the corolla are 5–8 mm (0.20–0.31 in) long with wings about 1.5 mm (0.059 in) wide. Flowering occurs in most months and the fruit is a cylindrical capsule, 8–10 mm (0.31–0.39 in) long.

== Taxonomy ==
Goodenia varia was first formally described in 1810 by Robert Brown in Prodromus Florae Novae Hollandiae. The specific epithet (varia) means "variable", referring to the shape of the leaves.

== Distribution and habitat ==
Sticky goodenia grows in Triodia grassland, woodland, mallee and coastal communities from Eucla in Western Australia and eastwards to south-eastern South Australia, north-western Victoria and far south-western New South Wales.
