= Acacia cineramis =

Grey-stem nealie

Scientific classification
- Kingdom: Plantae
- Clade: Tracheophytes
- Clade: Angiosperms
- Clade: Eudicots
- Clade: Rosids
- Order: Fabales
- Family: Fabaceae
- Subfamily: Caesalpinioideae
- Clade: Mimosoid clade
- Genus: Acacia
- Species: A. cineramis

Binomial name
- Acacia cineramis H.K.Orel

Synonyms
- Acacia sp. Gerang Gerung (M.G.Corrick 6451) Vic. Herbarium; Acacia sp. aff. rigens (Gerang Gerung)

Species of legume

Acacia cineramis, commonly known as grey-stem nealie, is a species of flowering plant in the family Fabaceae and is endemic to Victoria, Australia. It is a spreading shrub with terete, straight to slightly curved phyllodes, spherical heads of yellow flowers, and linear, curved pods.

== Description ==
Acacia cineramis is a spreading shrub that typically grows a height of 2 m (6 ft 7 in) and has terete branchlets with woolly white hairs pressed against the surface. Its phyllodes are terete, 20–60 mm (0.79–2.36 in) long, 0.8–1 mm (0.031–0.039 in) wide, more or less sharply pointed and often curved. The flowers are borne in two spherical heads in axils on peduncles 1–2 mm (0.039–0.079 in) long, each head 3–5 mm (0.12–0.20 in) in diameter with 9 to 15 yellow flowers. Flowering occurs from September to November and the pods are linear, 30–60 mm (1.2–2.4 in) long and curved with seeds about 2 mm (0.079 in) long.

This species is similar to Acacia rigens, but has whitish hairs on the branchlets and phyllodes.

== Taxonomy ==
Acacia cineramis was formally described in 2020 by Harvey K. Orel from specimens collected by Margaret Corrick in a small bushland reserve near Gerang Gerung in 1979. The specific epithet (cineramis) is compounded and derived from "cinereus" meaning 'ash-coloured' and "ramus", 'branch', alluding to the appearance of the branchlets.

== Distribution and habitat ==
Grey-stem nealie grows in sandy clay loam soils in mallee-heath or scrub and shrubby Eucalypt woodland in the Wimmera district of central-western Victoria.

== Conservation status ==
Acacia cineramis is listed as "critically endangered" under the Victorian Government Flora and Fauna Guarantee Act 1988.

== See also ==
- List of Acacia species
