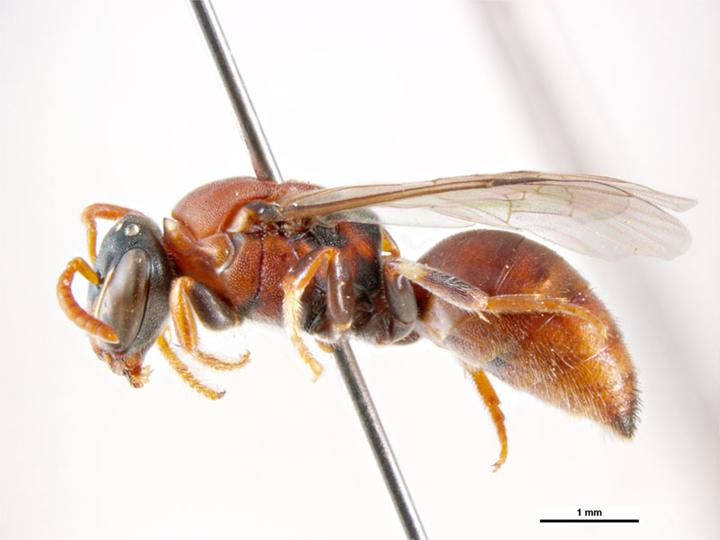
- Female

Scientific classification
- Kingdom: Animalia
- Phylum: Arthropoda
- Clade: Pancrustacea
- Class: Insecta
- Order: Hymenoptera
- Family: Colletidae
- Genus: Hylaeus
- Species: H. lateralis

Binomial name
- Hylaeus lateralis (Smith, 1879)

Synonyms
- Prosopis lateralis Smith, 1879; Hylaeus lateralis simillimus Rayment, 1935

= Hylaeus lateralis =

Species of bee

Hylaeus lateralis, or Hylaeus (Rhodohylaeus) lateralis, is a species of bee in the family Colletidae and subfamily Hylaeinae. It is endemic to Australia. It was described by English entomologist Frederick Smith in 1879.

== Distribution and habitat ==
The species occurs across southern and eastern Australia. Type localities include Geraldton in Western Australia and Kiata, Victoria.

== Behaviour ==
The adults are solitary flying mellivores with sedentary larvae. They nest in the hollow twigs of mistletoes.

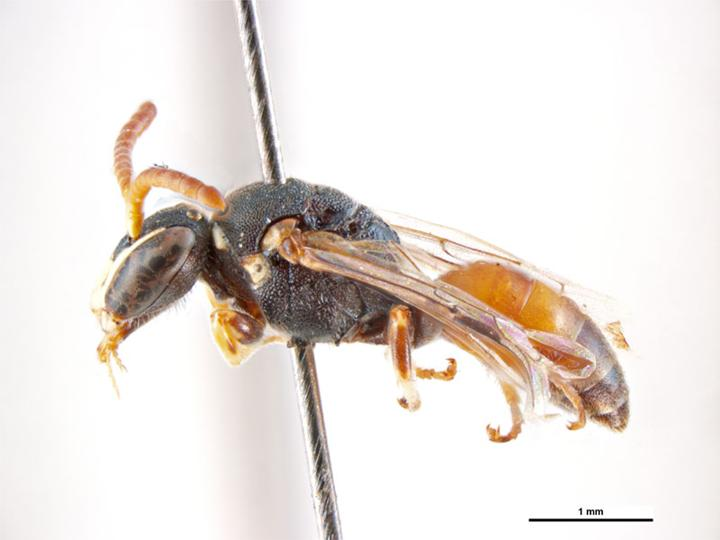
Male
