= Kenmare (disambiguation) =

Kenmare is a town in County Kerry, Ireland.

Kenmare may also refer to:

== Places ==
- Kenmare River, sea inlet in County Kerry
- Kenmare House, near Killarney
- Kenmare, North Dakota, USA
- Kenmare, Victoria, Australia, a locality in the Shire of Hindmarsh
- Kenmare, Western Australia, a locality of the Shire of Woodanilling

== Transport ==
- Kenmare Street, a street in Manhattan, New York, USA

== Other ==
- Earl of Kenmare, and earlier Viscount Kenmare, peerage extinct in 1953
- Kenmare lace, associated with the Kerry town
- Kenmare Resources, Irish mining company

== See also ==
- Kenmare GAA (District Team)
- Kenmare Shamrocks GAA Club
- Kenmare Kestrels, fictional quidditch team
