= Hylaeus meriti =

Scientific classification
- Kingdom: Animalia
- Phylum: Arthropoda
- Clade: Pancrustacea
- Class: Insecta
- Order: Hymenoptera
- Family: Colletidae
- Genus: Hylaeus
- Species: H. meriti

Binomial name
- Hylaeus meriti Rayment, 1935

Synonyms
- Hylaeus constrictus meriti Rayment, 1935

Species of bee

Hylaeus meriti, or Hylaeus (Rhodohylaeus) meriti, is a species of bee in the family Colletidae and subfamily Hylaeinae. It is endemic to Australia. It was described by Australian entomologist Tarlton Rayment in 1935.

== Description ==
Male body length is about 4 mm. Integumental colouration is mainly black, with creamy-yellow markings.

== Distribution and habitat ==
The species occurs in south-eastern Australia. The type locality is Kiata in north-western Victoria.

== Behaviour ==
The adults are flying mellivores.
