= Antwerp (disambiguation) =

Antwerp is the second largest city in Belgium and capital of the Antwerp province.

Antwerp may also refer to:

In Belgium

- Antwerp (district)
- Antwerp (province)

In the United States

- Antwerp, Ohio
- Antwerp Township, Michigan
- Antwerp, New York
- Antwerp (village), New York

In Australia

- Antwerp, Victoria

== Other ==
- Port of Antwerp
- Royal Antwerp FC, a football club
- Antwerp (novel), by Roberto Bolaño
- Antwerp, a poem by Ford Madox Ford
- "Antwerp", a type of bizarre monster in the Quest For Glory computer-game series that resembles a bouncy, man-sized paramecium
