= Tarranyurk =

- Town
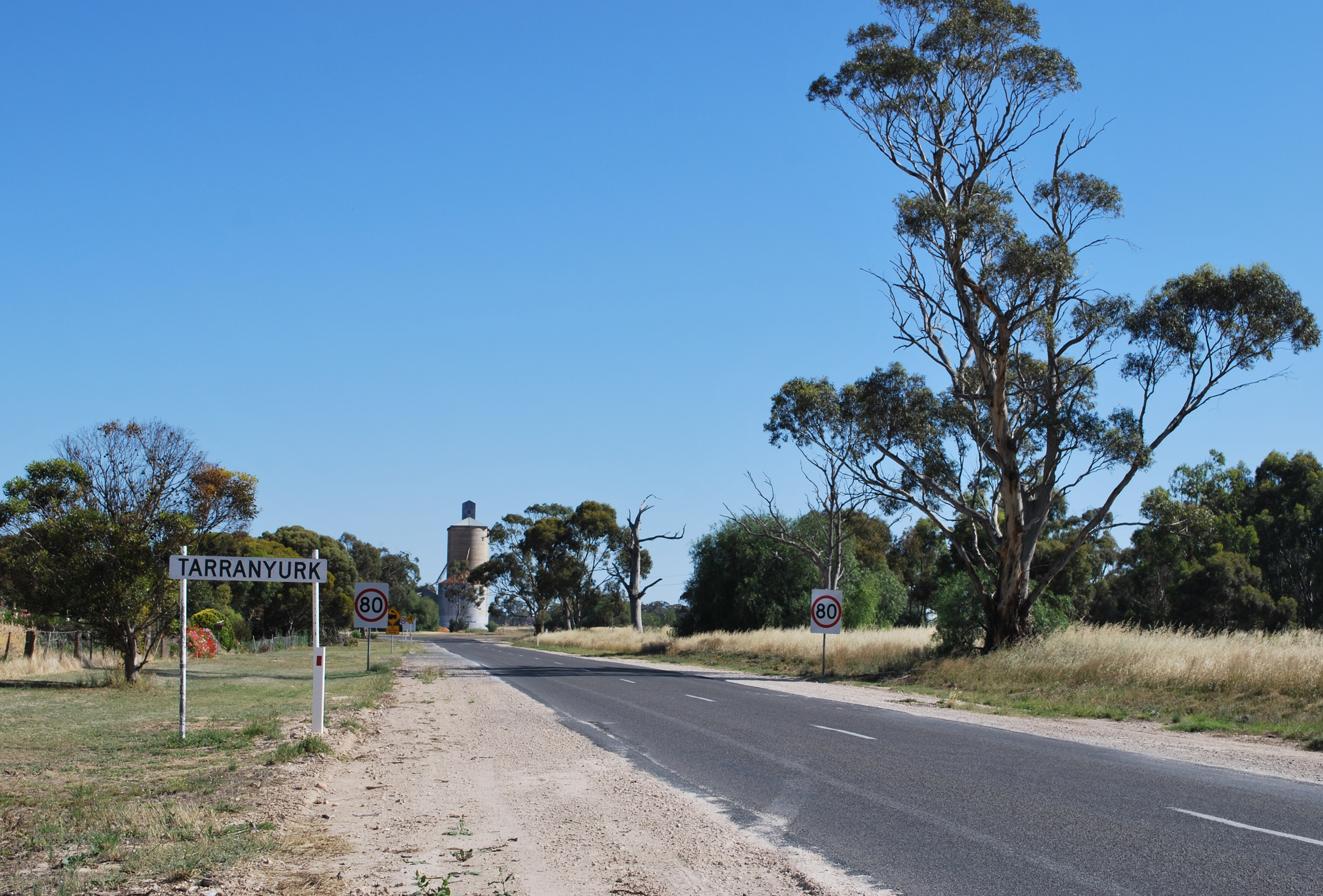
- Entering Tarranyurk, 2010

- Coordinates: 36°12′40″S 142°02′03″E
- Country: Australia
- State: Victoria
- LGA: Shire of Hindmarsh
- Location: 364 km (226 mi) NW of Melbourne; 64 km (40 mi) N of Horsham; 28 km (17 mi) N of Dimboola

Government
  - State electorate: Lowan
  - Federal division: Mallee

Population
  - Total: 30 (2016 census)
- Postcode: 3414

Tarranyurk is a locality in western Victoria, Australia. The locality is in the Shire of Hindmarsh local government area, 364 kilometres (226 mi) west north west of the state capital, Melbourne.

Tarranyurk has a fire brigade under the Country Fire Authority.

The main industry in the Tarranyurk district is broadacre agriculture. There are two factories in Tarranyurk, GrainRite Augers and Ahrens.

At the 2016 census, Tarranyurk had a population of 30.
