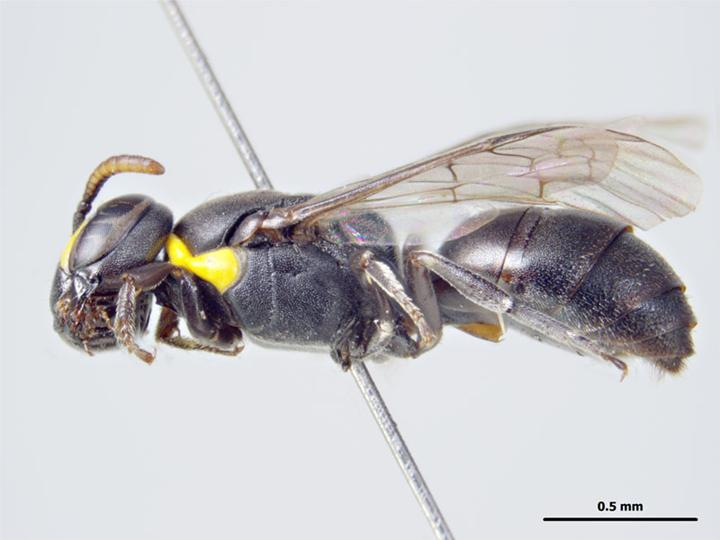
- Female

Scientific classification
- Kingdom: Animalia
- Phylum: Arthropoda
- Clade: Pancrustacea
- Class: Insecta
- Order: Hymenoptera
- Family: Colletidae
- Genus: Hylaeus
- Species: H. bituberculatus

Binomial name
- Hylaeus bituberculatus (Smith, 1879)

Synonyms
- Prosopis bituberculata Smith, 1879; Hylaeus bituberculatus tasmanicus Cockerell, 1926; Gnathoprosopis aureopicta Cockerell, 1929; Gnathoprosopis nigritarsus Rayment, 1929; Gnathoprosopis nigritarsus maculata Rayment, 1929; Gnathoprosopis borchii Rayment, 1935; Gnathoprosopis millariella Rayment, 1953

= Hylaeus bituberculatus =

Species of bee

Hylaeus bituberculatus, or Hylaeus (Gnathoprosopoides) bituberculatus, is a species of bee in the family Colletidae and subfamily Hylaeinae. It is endemic to Australia. It was described by English entomologist Frederick Smith in 1879.

== Distribution and habitat ==
The species occurs in south-eastern Australia. Type localities include Melbourne, Sandringham, Gorae West, Kiata and Cann River in Victoria, as well as Launceston, Tasmania, and Blackheath, New South Wales.

== Behaviour ==
The adults are flying mellivores. Flowering plants visited by the bees include Angophora, Banksia, Boronia, Callistemon, Eucalyptus, Hypochaeris and Leptospermum species.

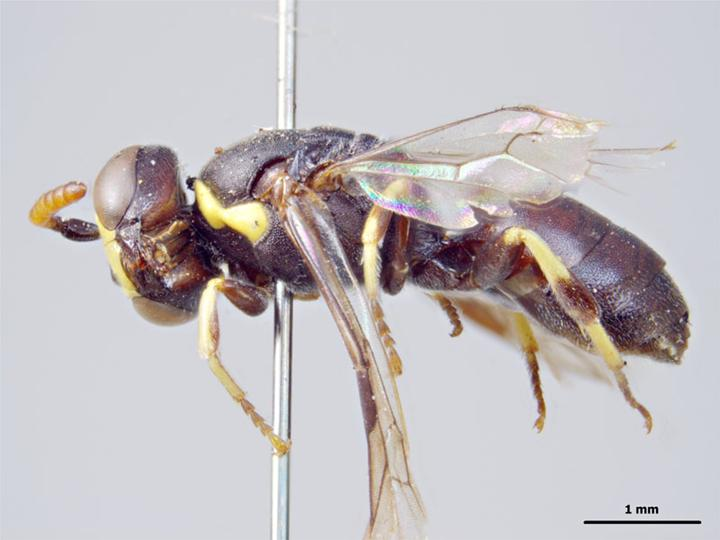
Male
