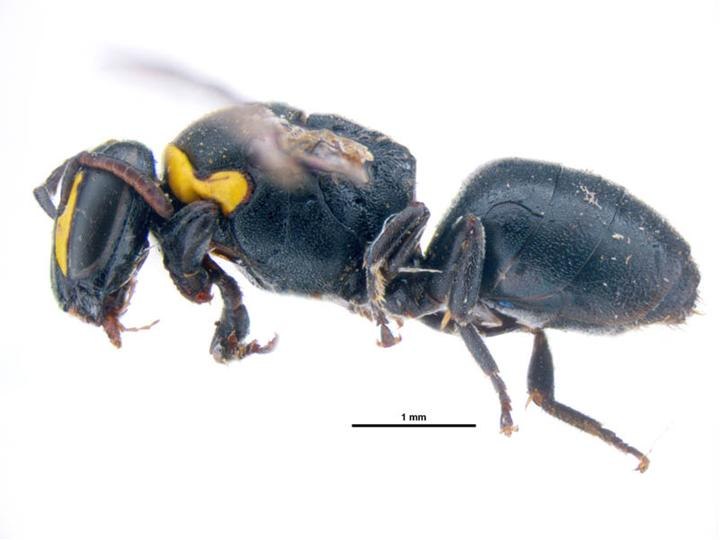
- Female

Scientific classification
- Kingdom: Animalia
- Phylum: Arthropoda
- Clade: Pancrustacea
- Class: Insecta
- Order: Hymenoptera
- Family: Colletidae
- Genus: Hylaeus
- Species: H. amiculus

Binomial name
- Hylaeus amiculus (Smith, 1879)

Synonyms
- Prosopis amicula Smith, 1879; Prosopis asinella Cockerell, 1913; Gnathoprosopis rowlandi Cockerell, 1914; Gnathoprosopis xanthocollaris Rayment, 1935

= Hylaeus amiculus =

Species of bee

Hylaeus amiculus, or Hylaeus (Gnathoprosopis) amiculus, is a species of bee in the family Colletidae and subfamily Hylaeinae. It is endemic to Australia. It was described by English entomologist Frederick Smith in 1879.

== Distribution and habitat ==
The species occurs across southern mainland Australia. Type localities include Geraldton and Yallingup, Western Australia; Purnong, South Australia, and Kiata in Victoria.

== Behaviour ==
The adults are flying mellivores. Flowering plants visited by the bees include Calytrix, Eremophila, Eucalyptus and Melaleuca species.

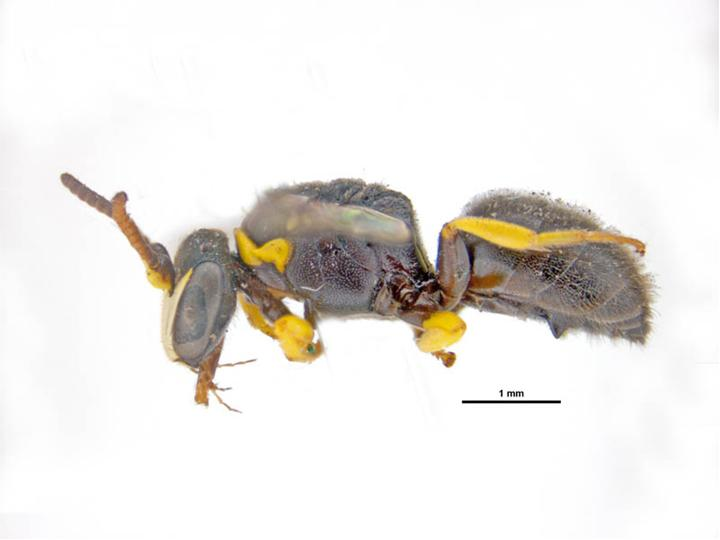
Male
