= Lorquon =

- Town
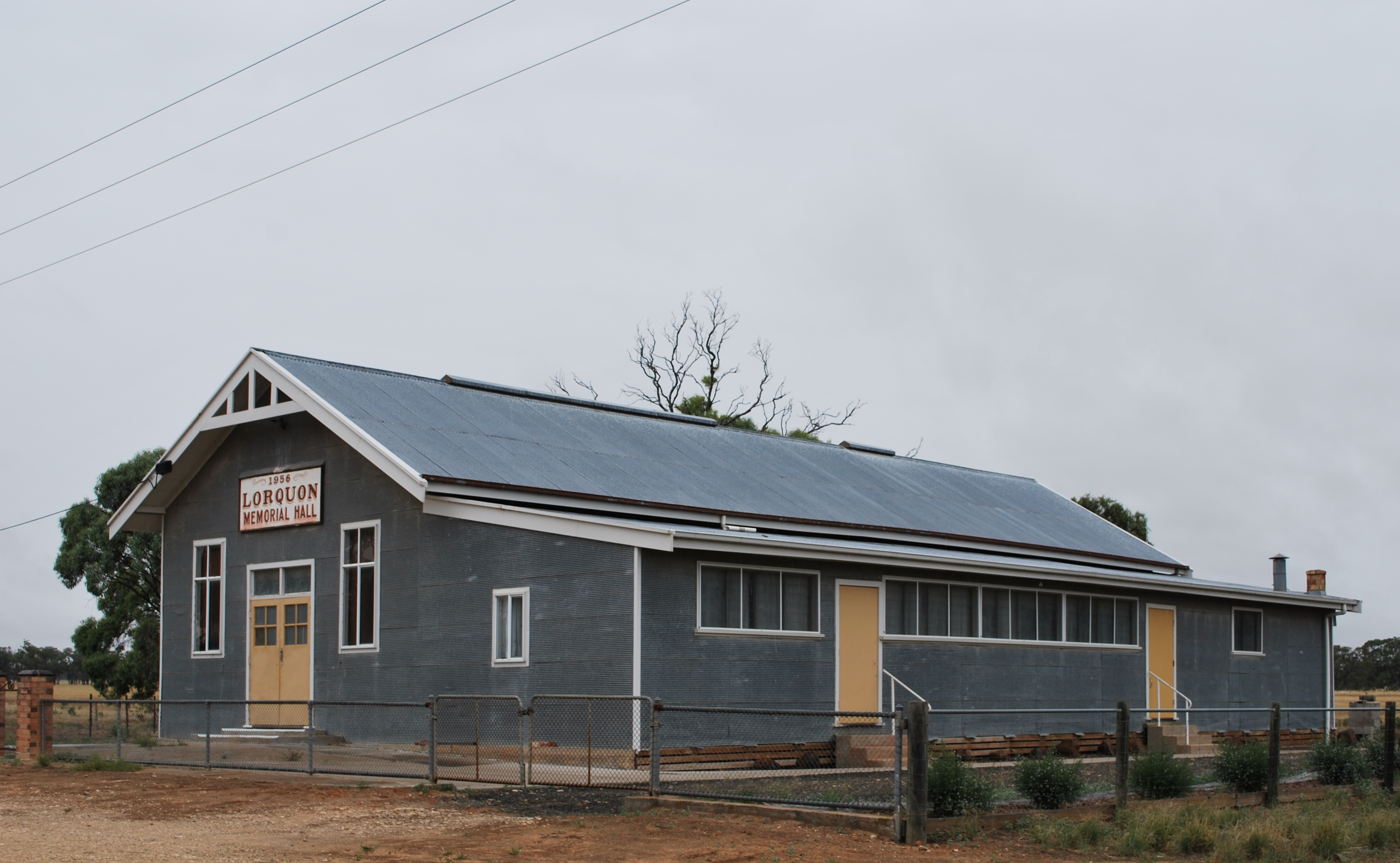
- Memorial hall at Lorquon, 2010

- Coordinates: 36°09′06″S 141°45′31″E
- Country: Australia
- State: Victoria
- LGA: Shire of Hindmarsh
- Location: 388 km (241 mi) NW of Melbourne; 88 km (55 mi) NW of Horsham; 28 km (17 mi) N of Nhill

Government
  - State electorate: Lowan
  - Federal division: Mallee

Population
  - Total: 8 (2021 census)
- Postcode: 3418

Lorquon is a locality in western Victoria, Australia, in the Shire of Hindmarsh local government area, 388 kilometres (241 mi) west-north-west of the state capital, Melbourne.

== History ==
The township of Lorquon was established in 1883, when 30 quarter-acre lots were sold by J. Affleck of Lorquon Station. The town's population peaked during the 1920s, numbering 279 at the 1921 census. At the 2021 Australian census, the population of the remnant of the town was eight.

A primary school opened in November 1884; it closed at the end of the 1979 school year.

A railway line from Jeparit to Lorquon was opened in 1912, and extended westward to Yanac in 1916. The passenger service ran until the 1950s, and the line was closed in 1986.

The Lorquon Football Club was established in 1890. It won the North Lowan League premiership in 1928. It merged with the team from the neighbouring town of Netherby in 1962, and as Netherby-Lorquon it competed in several local leagues before folding after the 1982 season. The former recreation reserve in Lorquon is now the Lorquon Bushland Reserve.

The Lorquon Memorial Hall in Affleck Street, built in 1956, is run and maintained by the Hindmarsh Shire Council.
