= Shire of Hindmarsh =

Coordinates: 36°08′00″S 141°39′00″E

- Local government area
- Location in Victoria

- Interactive map of Shire of Hindmarsh
- Country: Australia
- State: Victoria
- Region: Grampians
- Established: 1995
- Council seat: Nhill

Government
  - Mayor: Cr Melanie Albrecht
  - State electorate: Lowan
  - Federal division: Mallee

Area
  - Total: 7,524 km^{2} (2,905 sq mi)

Population
  - Total: 5,464 (2024)
  - Density: 0.72621/km^{2} (1.88087/sq mi)
- Gazetted: 20 January 1995
- Website: Shire of Hindmarsh
LGAs around Shire of Hindmarsh
Mildura	Mildura	Mildura
West Wimmera	Shire of Hindmarsh	Yarriambiack
West Wimmera	Horsham	Horsham

The Shire of Hindmarsh is a local government area in Victoria, Australia, located in the western part of the state. It covers an area of 7,527 square kilometres (2,906 mi^{2}) and in June 2024 had an estimated population of 5,464, having fallen from 5,852 in June 2013. It includes the towns of Dimboola, Nhill, Rainbow and Jeparit.

The Shire is governed and administered by the Hindmarsh Shire Council; its seat of local government and administrative centre is located at the Council headquarters in Nhill, it also has service centres located in Dimboola, Rainbow and Jeparit. The Shire is named after the major geographical feature in the region, Lake Hindmarsh, (which in turn was named after John Hindmarsh) located in the east of the LGA.

== History ==
The Shire of Hindmarsh was formed in 1995 from the amalgamation of the Shire of Lowan and Shire of Dimboola.

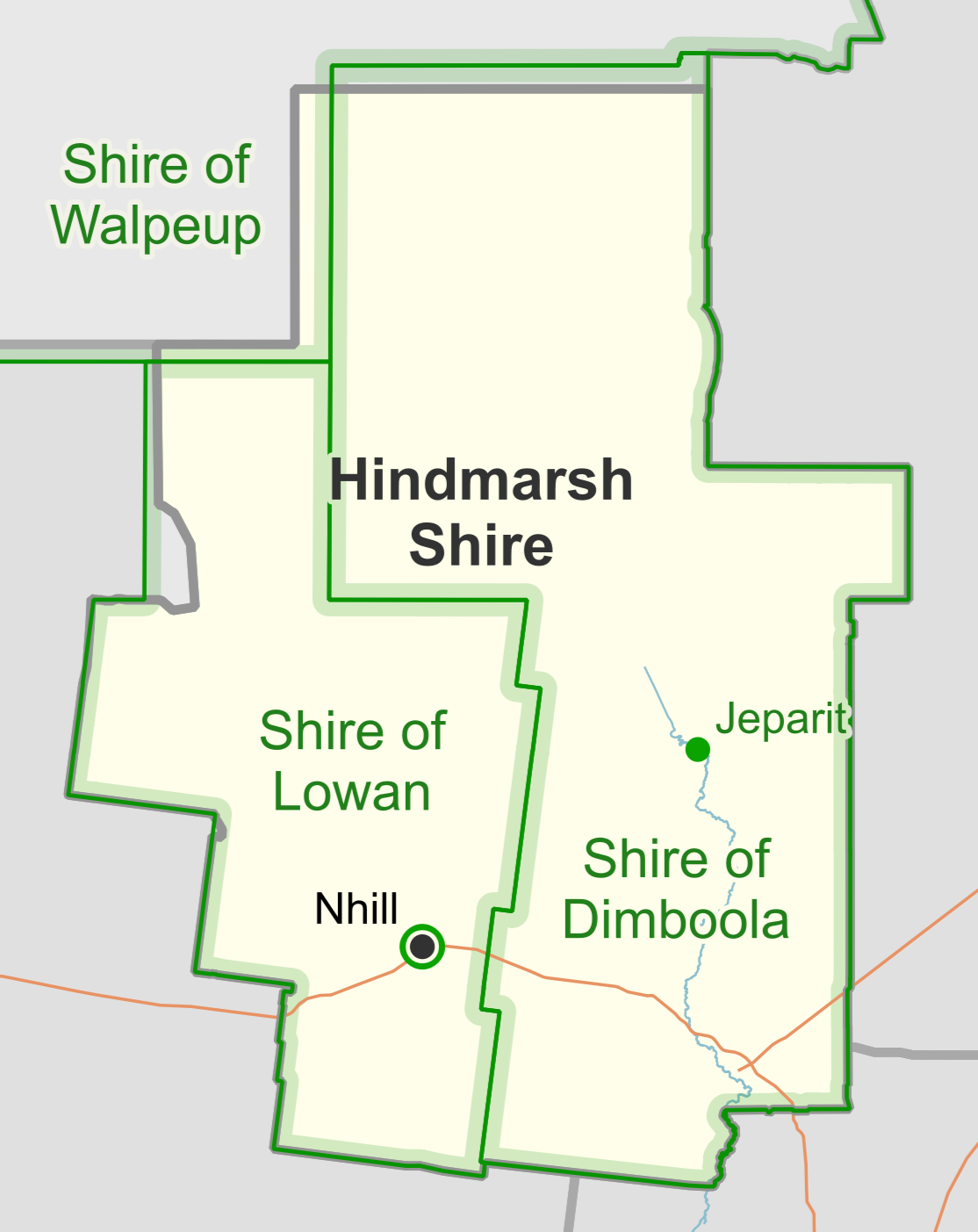
Hindmarsh Shire's predecessor LGAs (green) as they were in 1994. The administrative centres of the former LGAs are marked by green dots.

== Council ==
=== Current composition ===
Ward boundaries in use since 2005. Expand the map and click on a ward to see the ward name.

The council is composed of three wards and six councillors, with two councillors per ward elected to represent each ward. The current councillors, in order of election at the 2020 election, are:

Ward	Party	Councillor	Notes
East	Independent	Debra Nelson	Mayor (2015–2017)
East	Independent	Wendy Bywaters	Position vacant following 2020 election. By-election held December 2020.
North	Independent	Ron Ismay	Mayor (2017–2019, 2020–2021)
North	Independent	Brett Ireland	
West	Independent	Melanie Albrecht	Mayor (2021- )
West	Independent	Rob Gersch	Mayor (2019–2020)

=== Administration and governance ===
The council meets in the council chambers at the council headquarters in the Nhill Municipal Offices, which is also the location of the council's administrative activities. It provides customer services at its administrative centre in Nhill, and its service centres in Dimboola, Jeparit, and Rainbow.

== Townships and localities ==
The 2021 census, the shire had a population of 5,698 down from 5,721 in the 2016 census

Population
Locality	2016	2021
Albacutya	0	0
Antwerp	63	53
Big Desert^	3	8
Broughton^	145	65
Crymelon^	11	15
Dimboola^	1,730	1,635
Gerang Gerung	69	65
Glenlee	87	71
Jeparit	477	476
Kaniva^	803	891
Kenmare	8	3
Kiata	62	64
Little Desert	5	5
Lorquon	10	8
Netherby	120	111
Nhill	2,184	2,401
Rainbow^	683	672
Tarranyurk	30	36
Yanac	63	69

^ - Territory divided with another LGA

== See also ==
- List of places of worship in Hindmarsh Shire
- List of places on the Victorian Heritage Register in the Shire of Hindmarsh
