= Luv-a-Duck =

Australian duck meat company

- Type: Private
- Industry: Poultry processing
- Founded: 1968
- Founder: Arthur "Art" Shoppee
- Headquarters: Nhill, Victoria, Australia
- Area served: Australia and selected export markets, including Asia and the Middle East
- Revenue: A$86.4 million (2021)
- Number of employees: 200+
- Website: www.luvaduck.com.au

Luv-a-Duck is an Australian duck meat company founded in 1968 in Nhill, Victoria. The company began as a backyard duck-farming operation founded by Arthur "Art" Shoppee and later became a founding member of the Australian Duck Meat Association (ADMA). It operates as a vertically integrated agribusiness that includes breeding, incubation, grow-out, and processing. It is one of Australia's largest producers of duck meat and value-added duck products, supplying major domestic retailers, the restaurant sector, and export markets in Asia and the Middle East.

== History ==
Luv-a-Duck was started in the 1960s by Arthur "Art" Shoppee in Nhill, Victoria. Initially operating at a small scale, the business expanded over the past decades.

In the 1990s and early 2000s, the company imported breeding stock from the United Kingdom to improve genetic lines. According to a Victoria Parliamentary report, Luv-a-Duck was processing up to 55,000 ducks weekly and had an annual turnover that exceeded A$20 million in 2003.

In 2020, the company slashed more than 60 jobs during the COVID-19 pandemic, as it reduced processing days at its Nhill plant. Luv-a-Duck chief executive stated the reason was due to the fact that the company had heavily relied on the restaurant sector, and they suddenly lost 70% of the food service market when the government had abruptly forced indoor venues to close.

The Australian Financial Review (AFR) reported the company's annual revenue to have reached A$86.4 million for the 2021 financial year. By 2024, Luv-a-Duck employed almost 300 staff across multiple facilities located in Port Melbourne, Ballarat and Nhill.

== Operations and products ==
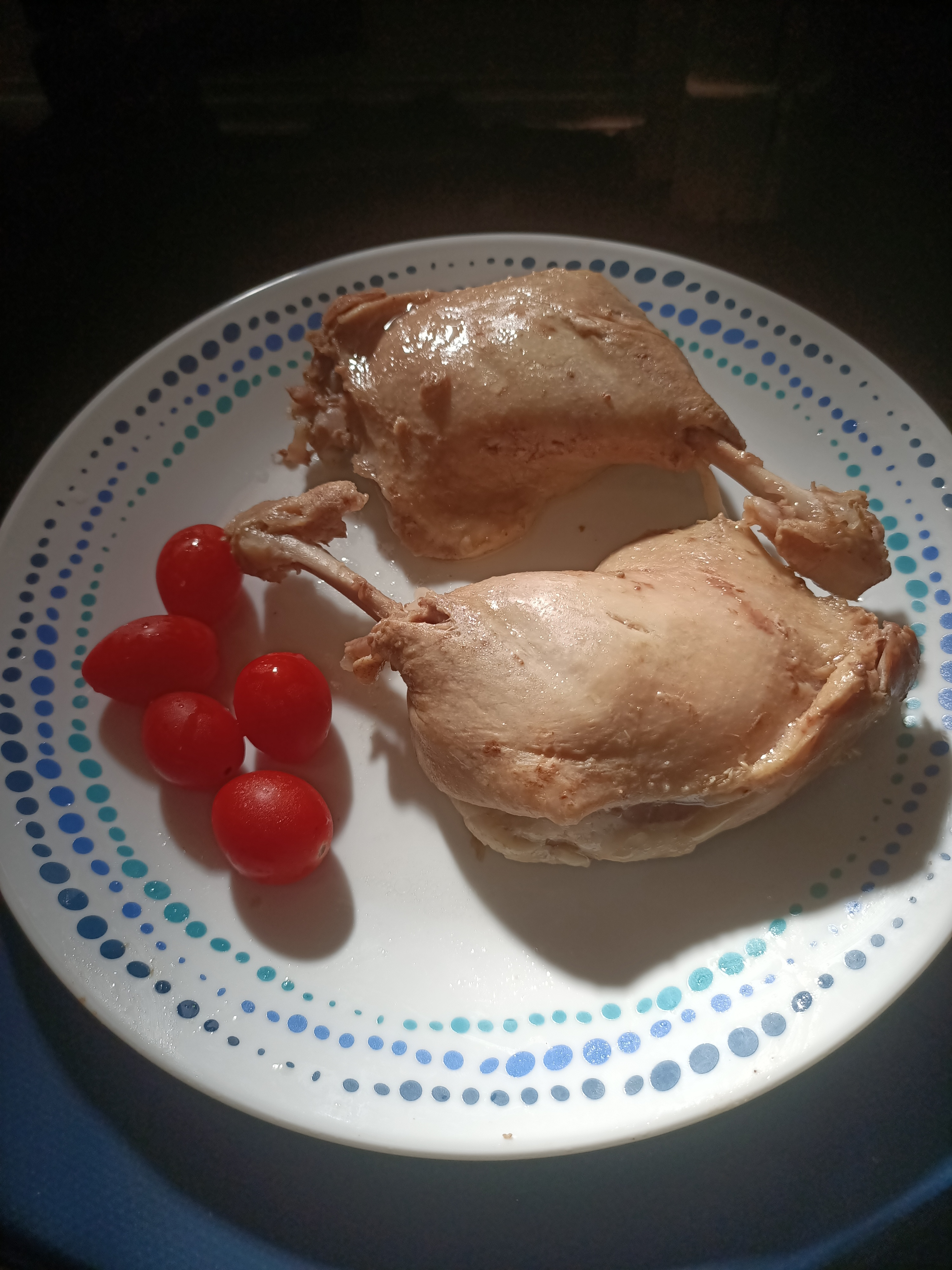
Confit duck legs with cherry tomatoes, prepared using a Luv-a-Duck product.

Luv-a-Duck produces a range of duck meat products that includes whole ducks, fresh cuts, marinated items, and pre-cooked or value-added products for both retail and restaurant sectors. Its products are distributed throughout Australia and are stocked in major supermarket chains such as Aldi Süd, Coles and Woolworths.

According to Poultry Hub Australia, Luv-a-Duck produces over 100,000 ducks per week and 30% of production is destined for the Asian market. In addition to meat products, the company exports duck feathers to Asia, primarily China. These exports have occasionally been disrupted in the past, including in 2012 and 2020, due to Avian influenza outbreaks and subsequent bans on Australian poultry exports.

Luv-a-Duck also operates a cooking school in Port Melbourne, that offers classes to the public on duck preparation and cooking techniques.

Daniel Shoppee, who is the grandson of the founder, Arthur Shoppee, currently serves as the company's CEO.

== Marketing ==
Australian chef and winner of MasterChef Australia 2017, Diana Chan, has served as the company's brand ambassador.

== Controversies ==
In 2013, Luv-a-Duck was fined A$360,000 for making misleading representation about its farming conditions. The company had wrongfully promoted its ducks as "range-reared and grain-fed", despite they were raised indoors. The Federal Court ordered corrective advertising and compliance measures.

== Community involvement ==
As part of a program to develop the local workforce in Nhill and better resettle Karen refugees, Luv-a-Duck has employed as many as 60 Karen people to work in its facilities in Nhill by 2017.
