= Antwerp, Victoria =

Antwerp
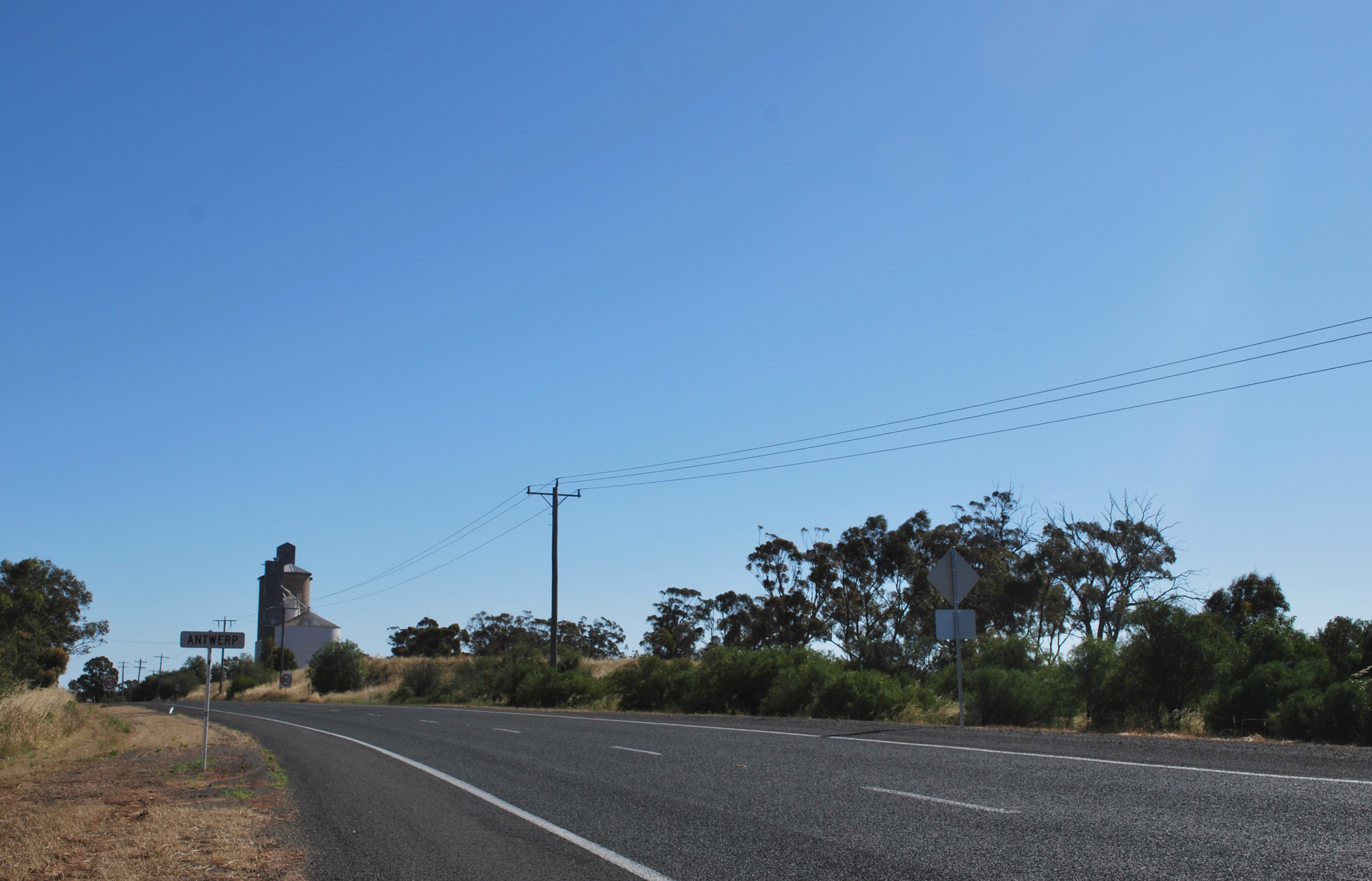
- The approach to Antwerp, 2010

- Coordinates: 36°18′0″S 142°03′0″E
- Country: Australia
- State: Victoria
- LGA: Shire of Hindmarsh
- Location: 356 km (221 mi) NW of Melbourne; 54 km (34 mi) NW of Horsham; 19 km (12 mi) N of Dimboola

Government
  - State electorate: Lowan
  - Federal division: Mallee

Population
  - Total: 53 (2021 census)
- Postcode: 3414

Antwerp is a locality in Victoria, Australia on the Dimboola – Rainbow Road, in the Shire of Hindmarsh, 14 kilometres (8.7 mi) north of Dimboola and 356 kilometres (221 mi) north-west of Melbourne. The Wimmera River runs 500 metres (550 yd) west of the locality. The population at the 2021 census was 53.

== History ==
The original inhabitants of the Antwerp area were the Wergaia people, also known as the Maligundidj, who have been living there for at least 20–30,000 years. They were divided into 20 clans each with their particular territory. They were a matrilineal society and intermarriage often occurred with the adjacent Jardwadjali and Dja Dja Wurrung clans.

The first Europeans to occupy the area were George Shaw and Horatio Ellerman. In 1846, they applied for 130,000 acres (530 km^{2}) for sheep grazing. Ellerman named the area after his birthplace, the Belgian city of Antwerp. In 1858, two Moravian missionaries, Reverend Friedrich Hagenauer and Reverend Spieseke, arrived in the area. By 1859, they had built a church and, in 1860, they baptised an Aboriginal for the first time.

During the 1880s, the Eucalyptus Mallee Oil Company began operations in the township, distilling eucalyptus oil, which was sold under the brand name EMU. The eucalyptus oil business was responsible for an influx of people into the district.

Antwerp State School No. 3104 (originally named Antwerp South State School) opened circa 1891, with tenders called to relocate a building from Koonik Koonik in 1901 and additions in 1905. The building was condemned by the Shire of Dimboola in 1909 on health grounds due to overcrowding. The school was rebuilt, and continued operating until it was closed at the end of 1981 due to falling enrolments. The school buildings were removed from the site after closure.

The first "Antwerp" post office opened on 25 November 1891. It was renamed Antwerp North in March 1892, and then Tarranyurk in May 1895, which corresponded to its location on the newly opened Dimboola to Jeparit railway. A new Antwerp post office opened in the Antwerp township itself in March 1892 and closed in January 1990.

Antwerp railway station and sidings on the Dimboola to Jeparit railway opened in June 1894. Before World War II, passengers were carried on mixed goods/passenger trains, which ran six days a week in 1928. The line was converted from broad to standard gauge in 1995.

The concrete "Geelong" silos for bulk grain handling and storage were built for the Grain Elevators Board of Victoria and opened for the 1939/40 harvest. Steel "ASCOM" silos were built in the late 1950s and a grain bunker area was constructed in the early 1980s.

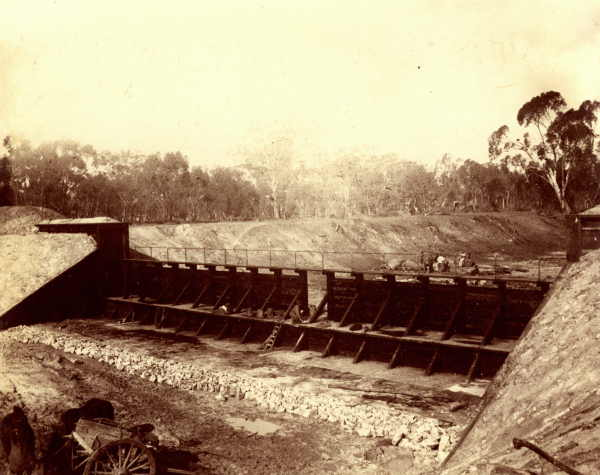
Antwerp Weir revealing foundations whilst under construction, 1903

A timber bridge was constructed across the river at Antwerp circa 1890. The bridge remained in service until replaced with a parallel concrete structure on the upstream side in about 1990.

A timber weir was built across the Wimmera River in 1903 to regulate the river and provide a perennial water supply. Open irrigation channels were constructed in the surrounding area.

Social infrastructure reflected the larger population in the early years, which included a hall built in 1904, a Methodist church and sports facilities including an oval and tennis courts at a recreation reserve across the river. The locality previously had its own football, cricket, tennis and rowing clubs, with rowing regattas held on the Wimmera River.

== Antwerp today ==
Today, the ruin of the Ebenezer Mission has been restored and is the locality's main tourist attraction. The township includes a few houses, the grain silos adjoining the railway line, the hall and adjacent tennis courts. The Antwerp Tennis Club is still competing. The grain facilities are not in use, and the railway siding is used to store surplus grain wagons.

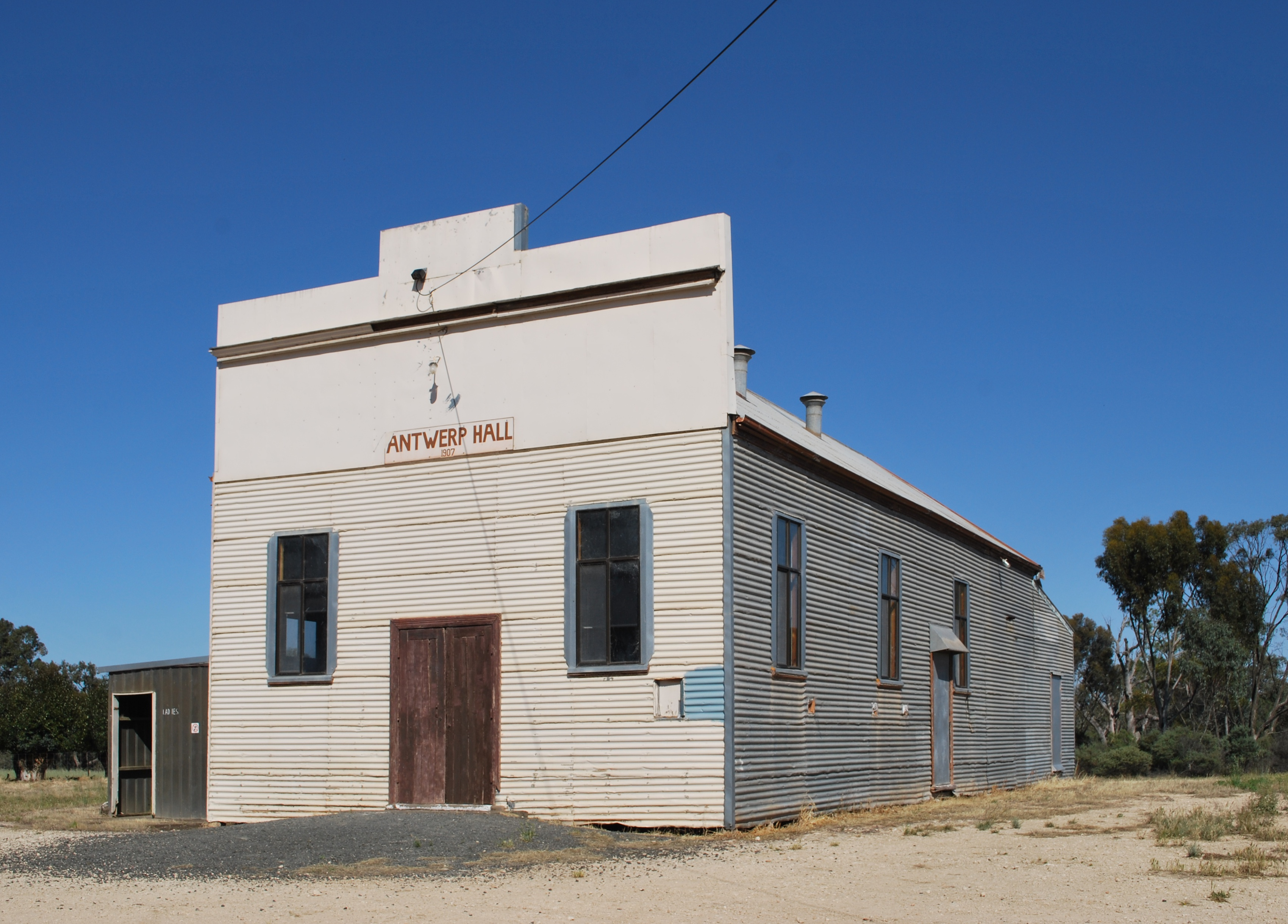
Antwerp Hall, 2010

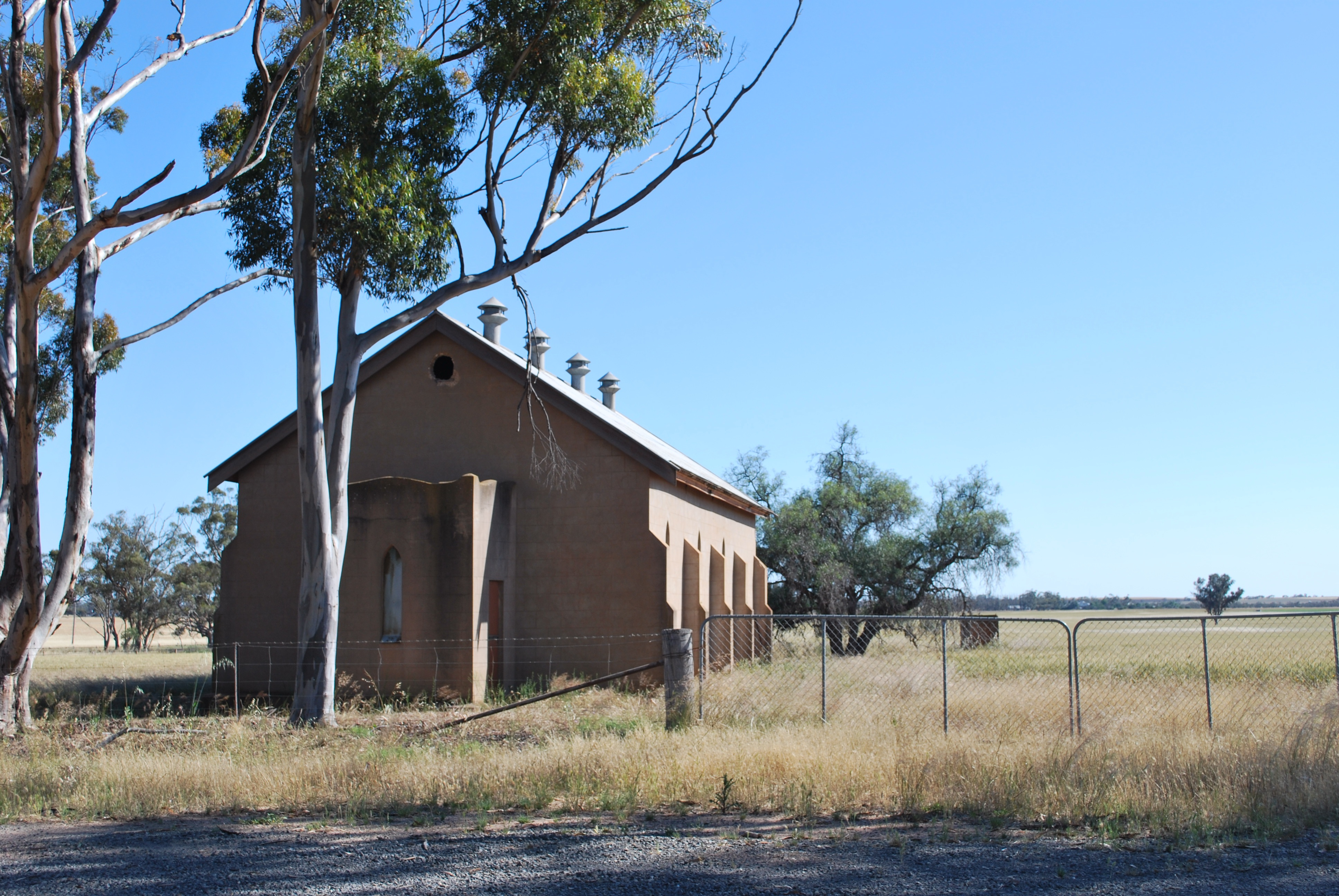
Former Antwerp Methodist Church, 2010

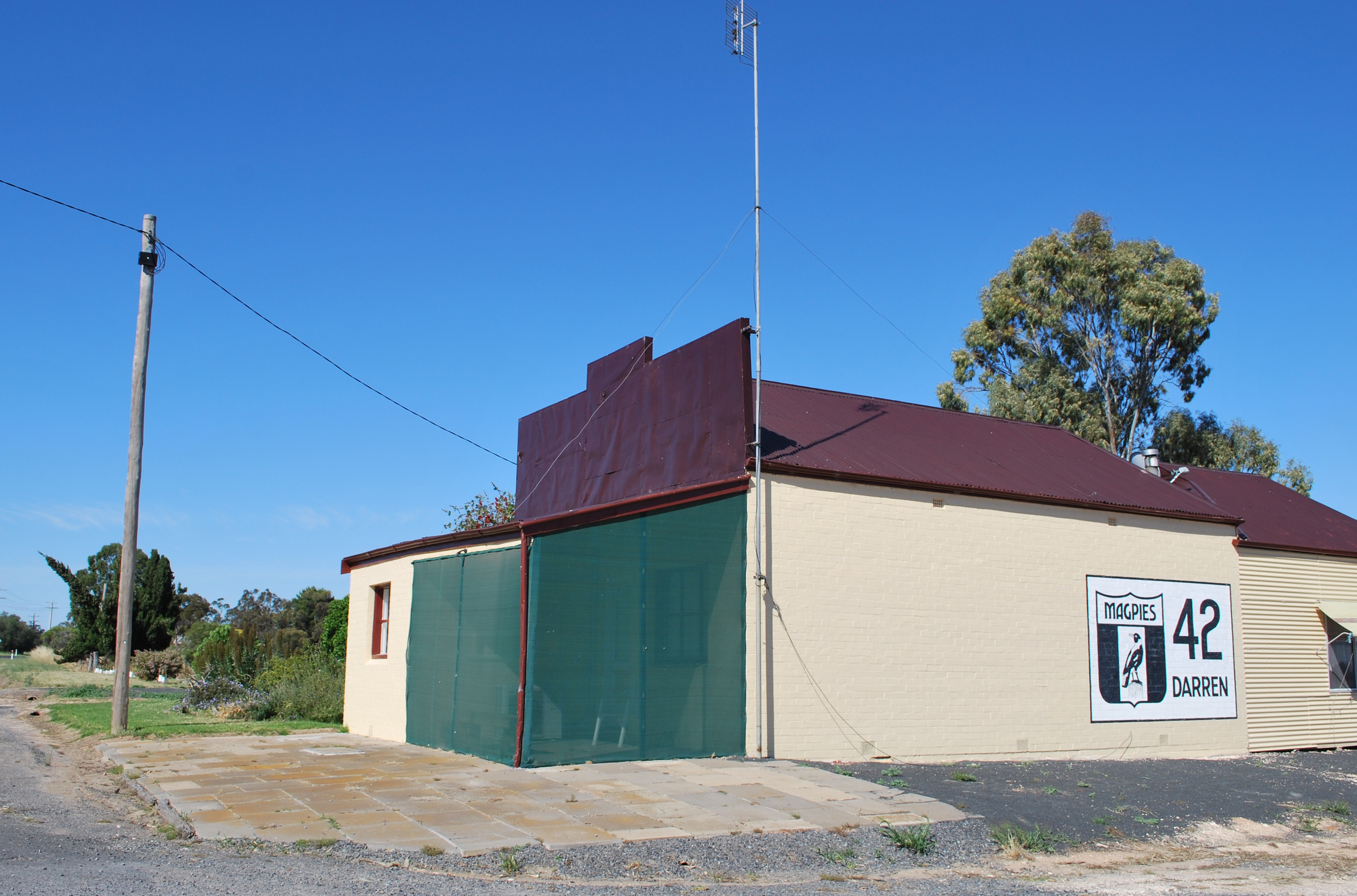
Former Antwerp Store & Post Office, 2010
