= Netherby, Victoria =

Netherby
- Town
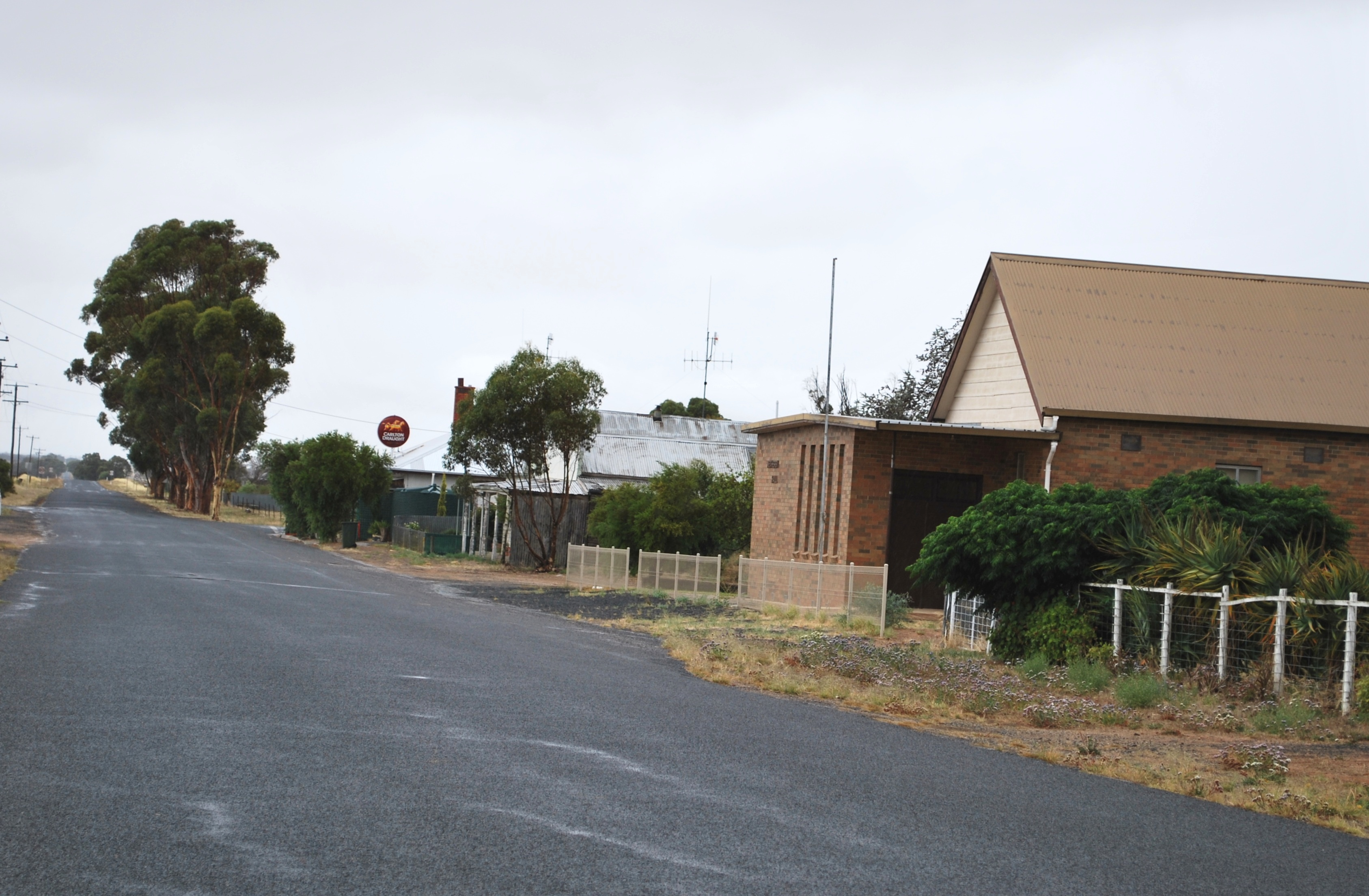
- Main street

- Coordinates: 36°06′0″S 141°39′0″E
- Country: Australia
- State: Victoria
- LGA: Shire of Hindmarsh
- Location: 406 km (252 mi) NW of Melbourne; 104 km (65 mi) NW of Horsham; 33 km (21 mi) N of Nhill

Government
  - State electorate: Lowan
  - Federal division: Mallee

Population
  - Total: 120 (2016 census)
- Postcode: 3418

Netherby is a town in western Victoria, in Australia. The town is approximately 406 kilometres (252 mi) north west from Melbourne.

== History ==
The town was originally known as Warraquil. It was renamed to Netherby in 1886 because the town's first teacher got confused and went to a town with a similar name (Warragul - 520 kilometres (320 mi) away). The town takes its name from the British full-rigged ship Netherby, 944 tons, which was wrecked on King Island in Bass Strait on 17 July 1866. The ship was carrying 52 crew and 452 emigrants to Brisbane, Queensland and all hands landed safely. After the castaways were rescued and taken to Melbourne, few elected to continue on to Queensland, but many settled in the district of Victoria then being opened up that was named after their ship.

Netherby Post Office opened on 1 September 1886 and closed in 1975.

The railway came to Netherby in 1916, when the line to Yanac opened. The last passenger service ran in the 1950s, and the line was closed in December 1986.

The Netherby Football Club was established in 1890. It merged with the team from the neighbouring town of Lorquon in 1962, and as Netherby-Lorquon it competed in several local leagues before folding after the 1982 season.
