= Australian Pinball Museum =

Pinball museum in Nhill, Australia

- Nhill, VIC, AUS
- Established: 2016
- Location: 21/22 Dimboola Rd, Nhill, Victoria, Australia
- Coordinates: 36.334405°S 141.668181°E
- Type: Pinball museum
- Collections: Pinball
- Owner: Lyndon / Simon Carter
- Website: https://www.pinballmuseum.com.au/

The Australian Pinball Museum is an interactive museum of pinball in Nhill, Australia. It is home to more than 150 machines manufactured between the early 1930s and present day, including a 1931 Baffle Ball.

The museum displays around 50 machines at a time, and showcases a large amount of original pinball ephemera across its walls.

The museum is attached to the Nhill Oasis Motel, both run by Lyndon Carter and his father Simon.

The traffic for the museum is predominately travelers passing through to and from Melbourne/Adelaide, locals of the area, and pinball enthusiasts from across the country.

== History ==
The Oasis Motel was purchased in 2008 by the Carter family.

Starting in 2016, Lyndon converted the family motel's business center into the museum. The machines were the collection from Simon's years routing machines as an arcade operator supplying arcade games and pinball machines to local pubs and businesses.

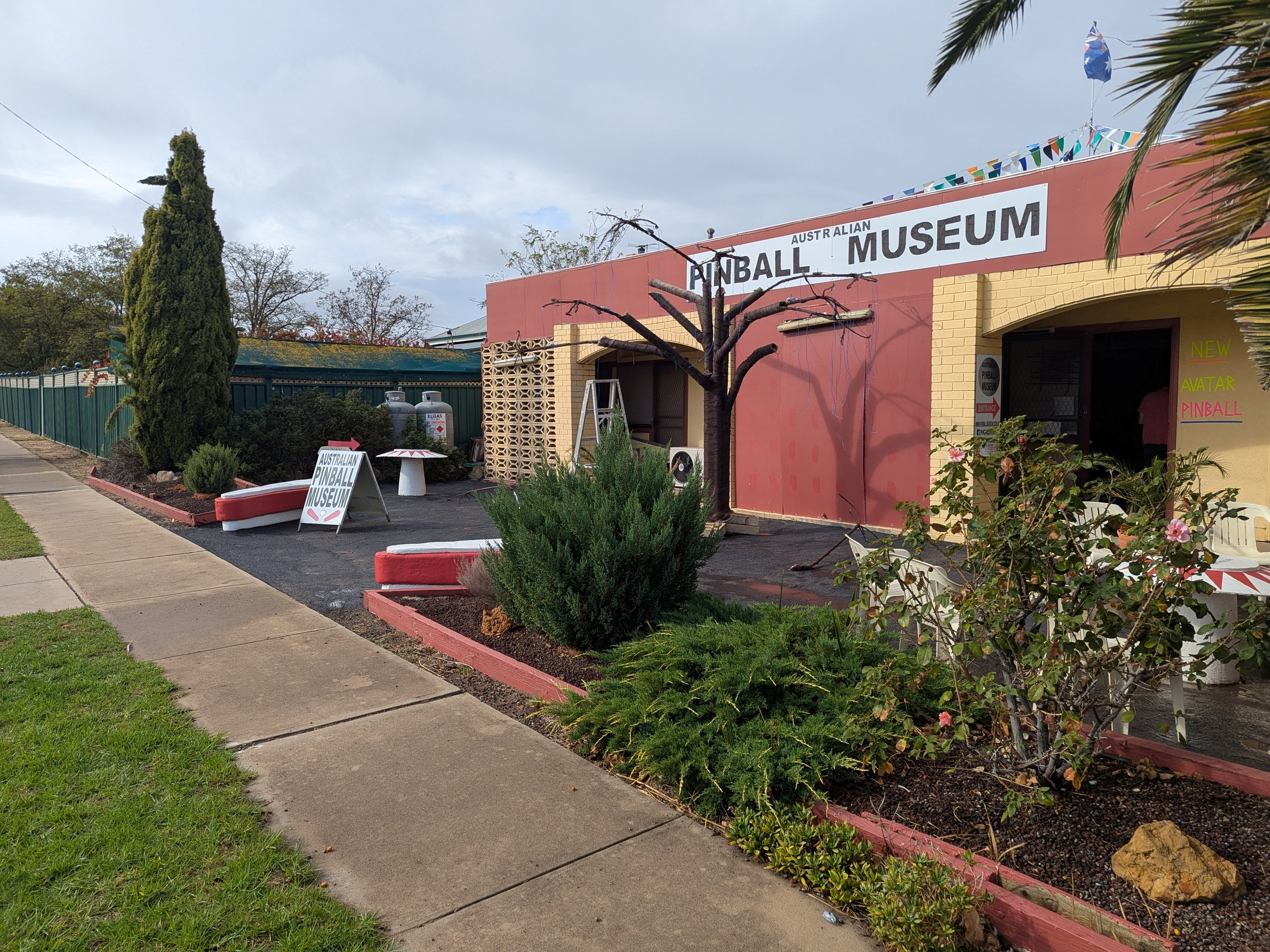
The front of the Australian Pinball Museum in Nhill, Australia

== Events ==
The Australian Pinball Museum hosts monthly tournaments on the last Saturday of each month.

By 2025, the museum had held over 50 International Flipper Pinball Association (IFPA) events allowing over 144 first time IFPA players to compete.
