= Yanac railway station =

Former railway station in Australia

Coordinates: 36°08′03.0″S 141°26′00.7″E

Yanac

General information
- Location: Maude St, Yanac, 3418, VIC; Australia
- Owner: VicTrack
- Line: Yanac

Other information
- Status: building demolished, silos and mound remain

History
- Opened: June 1916
- Closed: December 1986

Services
| Preceding station | Disused railways | Following station |
|---|---|---|
| Netherby | Yanac line | terminus |
| | List of closed railway stations in Victoria | |
Location

Yanac railway station was a railway station on the Yanac railway line, located in the town of Yanac. It was opened when the line was extended from Netherby and ran its last regularly scheduled passenger service sometime in the 1950s, closing to all traffic in 1986.
