= Yaapeet railway line =

Railway line in Victoria, Australia

Yaapeet

Overview
- Other name: Rainbow
- Status: Operational
- Owner: VicTrack
- Termini: Dimboola; Yaapeet
- Connecting lines: Serviceton, Yanac
- Stations: 10

History
- Opened: 1894

Technical
- Track gauge: 1,435 mm (4 ft 8 1/2 in)
- Old gauge: 1,600 mm (5 ft 3 in)
- Signalling: Train Order Working

The Yaapeet railway line (also known as the Rainbow railway line) is a standard-gauge railway line branching off of the Serviceton railway line. The line was opened in stages beginning from Dimboola to Jeparit on 19 June 1894 and reaching Yaapeet on 25 June 1914.

== History ==
The line was opened in stages from Dimboola to Jeparit on 19 June 1884, Jeparit to Rainbow on 2 November 1899 and Rainbow to Yaapeet on 26 June 1914.

Due to the 2011 Victorian floods, sections of the line were severely damaged and the line was closed until February 2012. The line is active up to the GrainCorp Rainbow Bunker site to the north of the town.

== Line Guide ==
Branched from the Serviceton railway line at Dimboola railway station

Arkona (formerly Katyil)

Antwerp

Tarranyurk

Jeparit

Yanac railway line branched off just after Jeparit

Ellam

Pullut

Rainbow

Albacutya

Yaapeet (formerly Turkey Bottom)
