= Nhill =

- Town
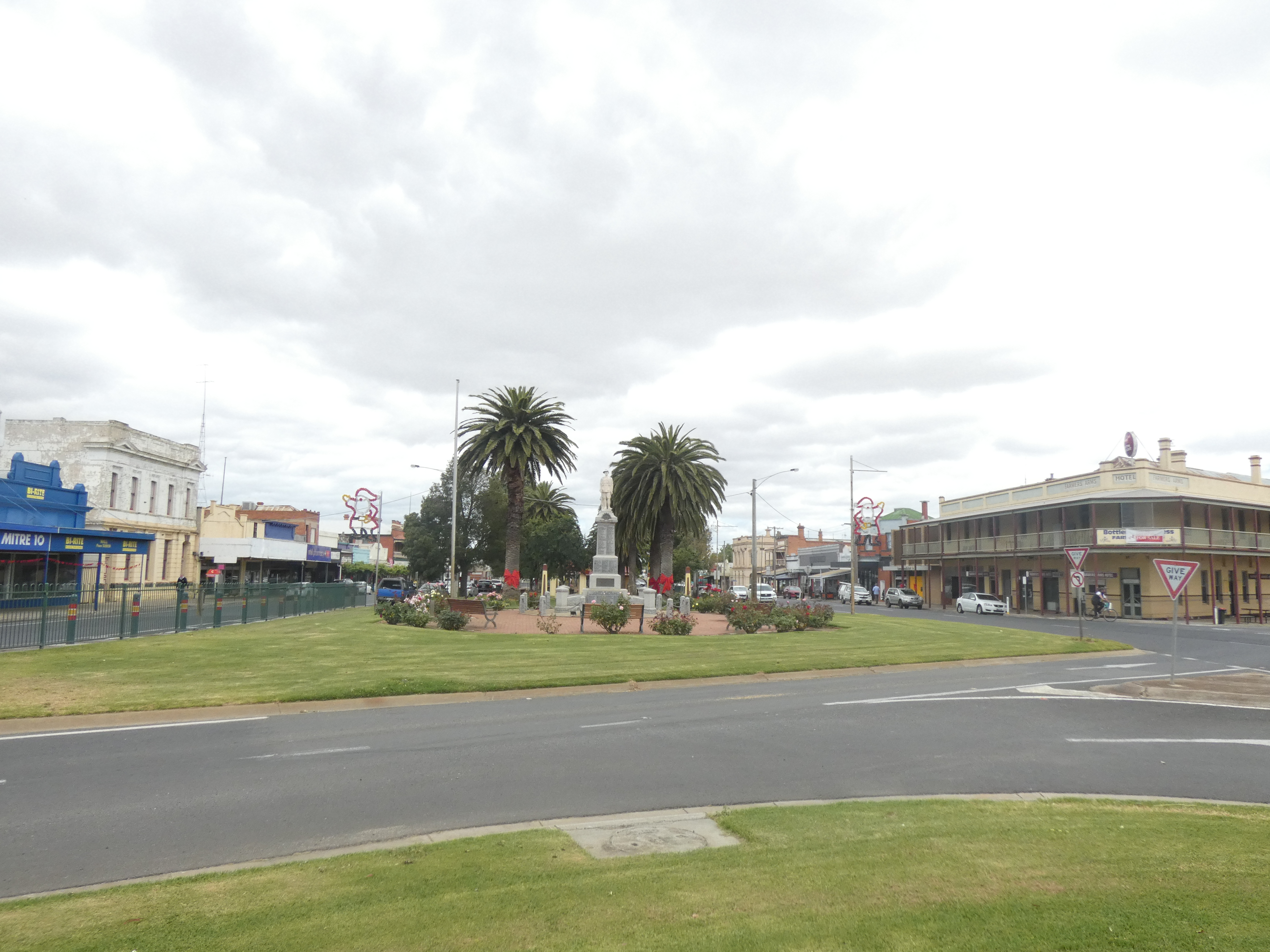
- Main street of Nhill, December 2022

- Coordinates: 36°20′0″S 141°39′0″E
- Country: Australia
- State: Victoria
- LGA: Shire of Hindmarsh
- Location: 374 km (232 mi) from Melbourne; 353 km (219 mi) from Adelaide; 76 km (47 mi) from Horsham; 39 km (24 mi) from Dimboola

Government
  - State electorate: Lowan
  - Federal division: Mallee
- Elevation: 133.0 m (436.4 ft)

Population
  - Total: 1,949 (2021 census)
- Postcode: 3418
- Mean max temp: 21.6 °C (70.9 °F)
- Mean min temp: 8.0 °C (46.4 °F)
- Annual rainfall: 412.9 mm (16.26 in)
Localities around Nhill
Yanac, Broughton	Netherby	Lorquon
Kaniva	Nhill	Glenlee, Kiata
Miram, Lawloit, Peronne	Goroke, Nurcoung, Little Desert	Little Desert

Nhill is a town in the Wimmera, in western Victoria, Australia. Nhill is located on the Western Highway, halfway between Adelaide and Melbourne. At the 2021 census, Nhill had a population of 1,949. "Nhill" is believed to be a Wergaia word meaning "early morning mist rising over water" or "white mist rising from the water".

Nhill is the administrative headquarters for the Shire of Hindmarsh. Residents are mainly employed in either farming or food processing, most notably in grain and fowl.

The town is home to a community of Karen people, the first of whom came to Australia as refugees, and who settled in Nhill in the early 2010s to work at the Luv-a-Duck food processing facility. In 2012, there were over 100 Karen residents in Nhill.

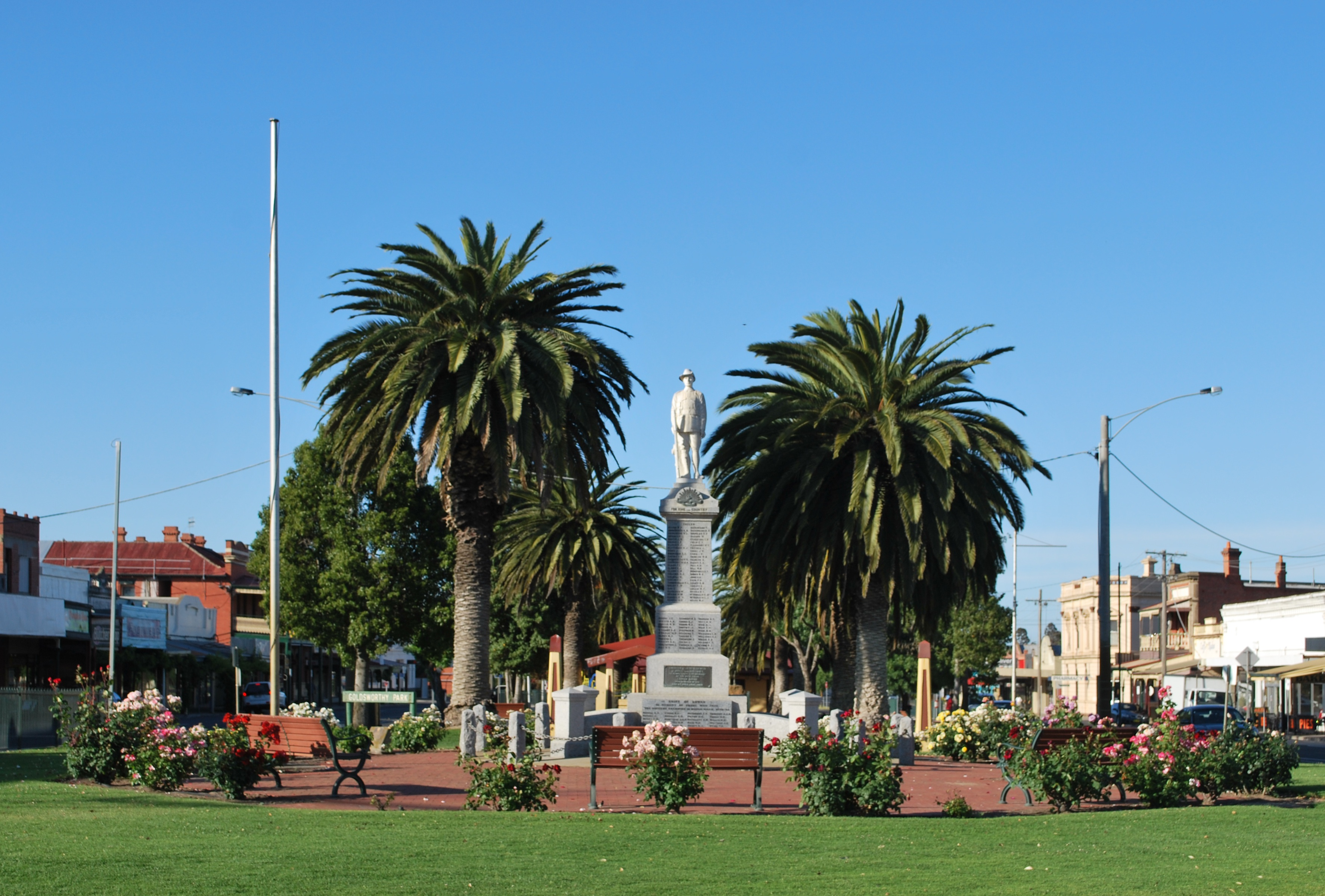
War memorial and park in the middle of the Western Highway as it passes through Nhill, November 2010

== History ==
The formally recognised traditional owners for the area in which Nhill sits are the Wotjobaluk, Jaadwa, Jadawadjali, Wergaia and Jupagik Nations. These Nations are represented by the Barengi Gadjin Land Council Aboriginal Corporation.

The area has been home to the Aboriginal people for thousands of years and was first visited by Europeans in 1845. The famous Aboriginal tracker and cricketer, Dick-a-Dick, later claimed to have been present at the first meeting between the Wotjobaluk and Europeans. Brothers Frank and John Oliver decided to build a flour mill on Crown land beside the Dimboola-Lawloit road, the township of Nhill grew from there.

Cobb and Co coaches serviced Nhill from 1883. Nhill Post Office opened on 1 January 1881. An earlier rural office (1861) was replaced by Lawloit Post Office

Nhill was the first Victorian town after the state capital Melbourne, to be supplied with electricity. Electric lighting was installed by 1892.

Nhill Airport, located 1.9 km north-west of the town, served as a major RAAF training base during the Second World War, instructing over 10,000 aircrew in 1941–1946.

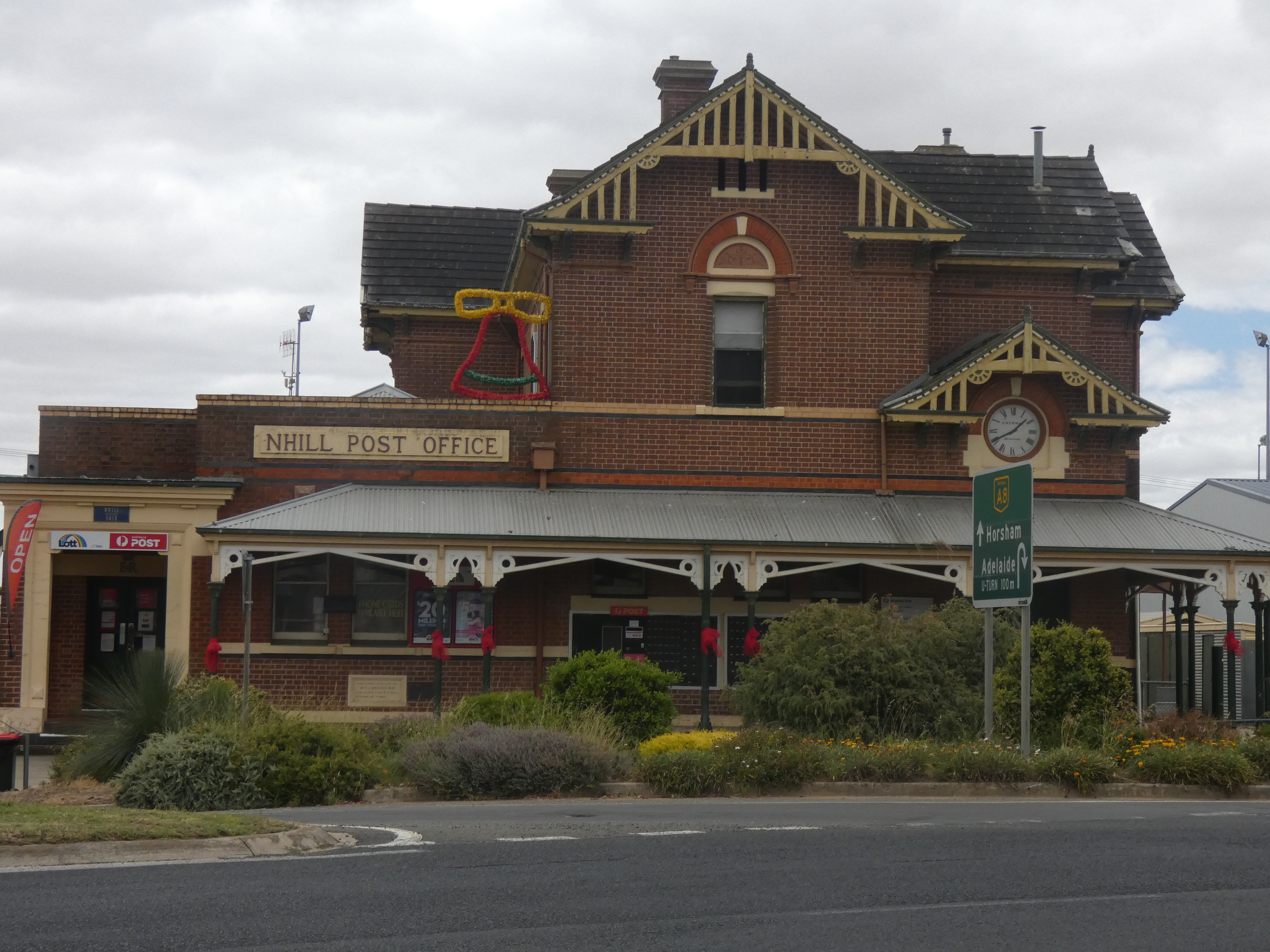
Post Office

Nhill is the namesake for Nhill crater on the planet Mars. The name was adopted by the International Astronomical Union in 1991.

== Climate ==
Nhill has a temperate semi-arid climate bordering on an oceanic climate (Köppen: BSk), with very warm, dry summers and cool, slightly wetter winters. Average maxima vary from 29.7 °C (85.5 °F) in January to 13.7 °C (56.7 °F) in July while average minima fluctuate between 13.0 °C (55.4 °F) in February and 3.4 °C (38.1 °F) in July. Mean average annual precipitation is low 412.9 mm (16.26 in), and is spread between 101.8 precipitation days. There are 90.5 clear days and 119.7 cloudy days annually. Extreme temperatures have ranged from 45.9 °C (114.6 °F) on 13 January 1939 to −7.2 °C (19.0 °F) on 16 August 1905.

Climate data for Nhill (36.33°S 141.64°E, 133 m AMSL) (1883-2008 normals & extremes)
Month	Jan	Feb	Mar	Apr	May	Jun	Jul	Aug	Sep	Oct	Nov	Dec	Year
Record high °C (°F)	45.9 (114.6)	45.7 (114.3)	41.9 (107.4)	36.8 (98.2)	30.6 (87.1)	25.0 (77.0)	25.0 (77.0)	28.2 (82.8)	34.4 (93.9)	37.9 (100.2)	42.8 (109.0)	45.0 (113.0)	45.9 (114.6)
Mean daily maximum °C (°F)	29.7 (85.5)	29.5 (85.1)	26.3 (79.3)	21.6 (70.9)	17.4 (63.3)	14.3 (57.7)	13.7 (56.7)	15.1 (59.2)	17.8 (64.0)	21.1 (70.0)	24.9 (76.8)	27.9 (82.2)	21.6 (70.9)
Mean daily minimum °C (°F)	12.9 (55.2)	13.0 (55.4)	11.0 (51.8)	8.1 (46.6)	6.0 (42.8)	4.2 (39.6)	3.4 (38.1)	4.1 (39.4)	5.4 (41.7)	7.0 (44.6)	9.4 (48.9)	11.5 (52.7)	8.0 (46.4)
Record low °C (°F)	0.0 (32.0)	1.7 (35.1)	−0.6 (30.9)	−2.8 (27.0)	−5.0 (23.0)	−6.5 (20.3)	−6.1 (21.0)	−7.2 (19.0)	−6.1 (21.0)	−5.0 (23.0)	−4.4 (24.1)	−1.1 (30.0)	−7.2 (19.0)
Average precipitation mm (inches)	22.0 (0.87)	22.7 (0.89)	21.2 (0.83)	28.4 (1.12)	40.2 (1.58)	45.8 (1.80)	45.4 (1.79)	47.3 (1.86)	43.3 (1.70)	40.2 (1.58)	29.7 (1.17)	26.4 (1.04)	412.9 (16.26)
Average precipitation days (≥ 0.2 mm)	4.0	3.5	4.3	6.7	9.9	12.1	13.7	13.8	11.8	9.7	6.8	5.5	101.8
Average afternoon relative humidity (%)	30	32	36	45	57	65	64	60	54	45	38	33	47
Average dew point °C (°F)	7.1 (44.8)	7.8 (46.0)	7.7 (45.9)	7.0 (44.6)	7.2 (45.0)	6.7 (44.1)	5.9 (42.6)	5.7 (42.3)	6.2 (43.2)	6.0 (42.8)	6.0 (42.8)	6.2 (43.2)	6.6 (43.9)
Source: Bureau of Meteorology (1883-2008 normals & extremes)

Nhill Airport is located 1.9 kilometres (1.2 mi) northwest of Nhill, and has available climate data since 2003.

Climate data for Nhill Airport (36.31°S 141.65°E, 139 m AMSL) (2003-2024 normals & extremes)
Month	Jan	Feb	Mar	Apr	May	Jun	Jul	Aug	Sep	Oct	Nov	Dec	Year
Record high °C (°F)	45.3 (113.5)	47.1 (116.8)	41.2 (106.2)	36.8 (98.2)	27.9 (82.2)	24.0 (75.2)	22.4 (72.3)	27.2 (81.0)	32.3 (90.1)	38.0 (100.4)	42.4 (108.3)	47.1 (116.8)	47.1 (116.8)
Mean daily maximum °C (°F)	31.3 (88.3)	30.3 (86.5)	27.3 (81.1)	22.5 (72.5)	17.8 (64.0)	14.5 (58.1)	14.0 (57.2)	15.5 (59.9)	18.4 (65.1)	22.3 (72.1)	26.2 (79.2)	28.9 (84.0)	22.4 (72.3)
Mean daily minimum °C (°F)	14.0 (57.2)	13.3 (55.9)	11.7 (53.1)	9.0 (48.2)	6.7 (44.1)	4.8 (40.6)	4.4 (39.9)	4.8 (40.6)	5.8 (42.4)	7.4 (45.3)	10.2 (50.4)	12.2 (54.0)	8.7 (47.6)
Record low °C (°F)	4.9 (40.8)	4.5 (40.1)	2.0 (35.6)	−1.7 (28.9)	−3.3 (26.1)	−5.0 (23.0)	−3.0 (26.6)	−3.0 (26.6)	−1.6 (29.1)	−0.4 (31.3)	1.3 (34.3)	3.4 (38.1)	−5.0 (23.0)
Average precipitation mm (inches)	29.1 (1.15)	14.4 (0.57)	15.2 (0.60)	20.8 (0.82)	30.0 (1.18)	39.2 (1.54)	35.1 (1.38)	43.1 (1.70)	32.5 (1.28)	34.7 (1.37)	33.2 (1.31)	28.5 (1.12)	357.6 (14.08)
Average precipitation days (≥ 0.2 mm)	4.8	3.9	5.6	6.3	12.0	15.6	17.8	16.5	13.5	9.2	7.1	6.8	119.1
Source: Bureau of Meteorology (2003-2024 normals & extremes)

== Demographics ==
As of the 2016 census, 1,749 people resided in Nhill. The median age of persons in Nhill was 48 years. Children aged 0–14 years made up 14.5% of the population. People over the age of 65 years made up 29.7% of the population There were slightly more females than males with 52.1% of the population female and 47.9% male. The average household size is 2.2 persons per household. The average number of children per family for families with children is 1.9.

80.3% of people in Nhill were born in Australia. Of all persons living in Nhill, 1.3% (22 persons) were Aboriginal and/or Torres Strait Islander people. This is higher than for the state of Victoria (0.8%) and lower than the national average (2.8%). The most common ancestries in Nhill were English 31.5%, Australian 29.6%, German 10.2%, Scottish 6.7% and Karen 5.4%.

The 2016 Australian census listed the main religions in Nhill as Uniting Church 21.8%, Anglican 14.6% and Catholic 11.1%, Lutheran 10.5%. 20.4% recorded "no religion".

== Industry and facilities ==
The major employer in the town is Luv-a-Duck—a duck meat grower and processor—and associated businesses. Tourism is another local industry; Nhill services the highway traffic passing through. Nhill is recognised by the transport industry as the halfway point by road between Melbourne and Adelaide. Transport companies use Nhill as their 'changeover' point. Nhill railway station is serviced by The Overland that stops three times a week. Air services are at Nhill Airport. Bus services are provided by V/Line and Firefly several times daily.

Nhill has three hotels; the Commercial Hotel, the Farmers Arms Hotel and the Union Hotel. Nhill has a caravan park and a number of motels.

Nhill has a Lutheran Primary school, a Catholic Primary School and a P-12 public school.

== Events and attractions ==
The Nhill Show is held each year on the second Thursday of October. It includes rides, farm animals, rural Australian farm machinery, horse riding show, art competitions, cooking competitions, photo competitions and at the closing of the Show there is a fireworks display. Up until 2012 Nhill hosted a "Duck & Jazz Festival" in mid February.

The Nhill Aviation Heritage Centre is located at nearby historical Nhill airport. Included in its displays is a rare Avro Anson aircraft undergoing restoration. In April 2018, it also acquired a Wirraway aeroplane.

The Australian Pinball Museum is located at the eastern side of Nhill. Included in its displays of rare pinball related artwork and memorabilia is the largest selection of pinball machines available to play in Australia.

== Sport ==
Nhill has an Australian Rules football and netball club, with multiple teams competing in the Wimmera Football League. Nhill is also the base of the Cricket competition known as the West Wimmera Cricket Association. Nhill & District Sporting Club which includes football, netball, hockey and cricket.

Also it has a Tennis Club and Pony Club. Nhill has a golf course at the Nhill Golf Club on Netherby Road.

Nhill was the birthplace of Masters Australian football (a.k.a. "Superules").

The horse racing club, the Wimmera Racing Club, holds the Nhill Cup meeting on Boxing Day (26 December).

The Nhill RSL Gift was a sprint race run over 130 yards was established in 1938 and initially won by Tim Bolton. Jim Williams from Western Australia won the 1939 Gift race.

== In film ==
The 1985 film Wrong World was partly filmed in Nhill. Nhill is also the intended destination in the plot of the 1997 film Road to Nhill.

== Notable people ==
- The Indigenous cricketer Dick-a-Dick was born near Nhill about 1834.
- Nhill is the hometown of former Australian rules football player Jason McCartney, who suffered severe injuries during the 2002 Bali terrorist bombing, and later recovered enough to make a comeback to the sport.
- Nhill is the birthplace of Janet Powell, leader of the Australian Democrats between 1990 and 1991, and Senator for Victoria between 1986 and 1993.
- Nhill is the birthplace of David Leyonhjelm, former NSW senator of the Liberal Democratic Party.
- Former Essendon footballers David Flood and Dean Wallis are from Nhill.
- Former National Soccer League defender Manny Gelagotis, who played over 100 NSL matches for the Gippsland Falcons, was also born in Nhill.
- Nhill is the hometown of Lucy Stephan, a rower who has represented Australia, winning a bronze medal in the Women's Four event at the 2013 Rowing World Championships in Korea and won Gold at the 2020 Tokyo Olympics in the Women's Coxless Four.
