= Gerang Gerung =

Locality in Victoria, Australia

Gerang Gerung Victoria
- Coordinates: 36°22′19″S 141°53′03″E
- Population: 69 (2016 census)
- Postcode(s): 3418
- Location: 353 km (219 mi) NW of Melbourne; 22 km (14 mi) E of Nhill; 17 km (11 mi) NW of Dimboola
- LGA(s): Shire of Hindmarsh
- State electorate(s): Lowan
- Federal division(s): Mallee

Gerang Gerung is a locality located in the Wimmera region of Victoria, Australia. Gerang Gerung is located 353 km (219 miles) north west of the state capital, Melbourne and 375 km (233 miles) away from Adelaide, South Australia. The name "Gerang Gerung" is believed to come from the Aboriginal word for leaf or branch. The locality had a population of 69 people as of 2016, of which 56% were male and 43% were female.

== History ==
The settlement began in 1846 as a small village in 1881 a small hotel opened up and in In 1884 a school was built. In 1887 a railway station was constructed along with a general store, a Bible Christian Church and a public hall. By 1958 the hotel had closed and by 1984 the Methodist congregation constructed a new church. The general store closed in 1985 followed by the post office in 1988 and the school in 1993.

== Facilities ==
Gerang Gerung currently has a CFA fire station, recreation reserve, tennis court and public hall.
