= Rainbow, Victoria =

Rainbow Victoria
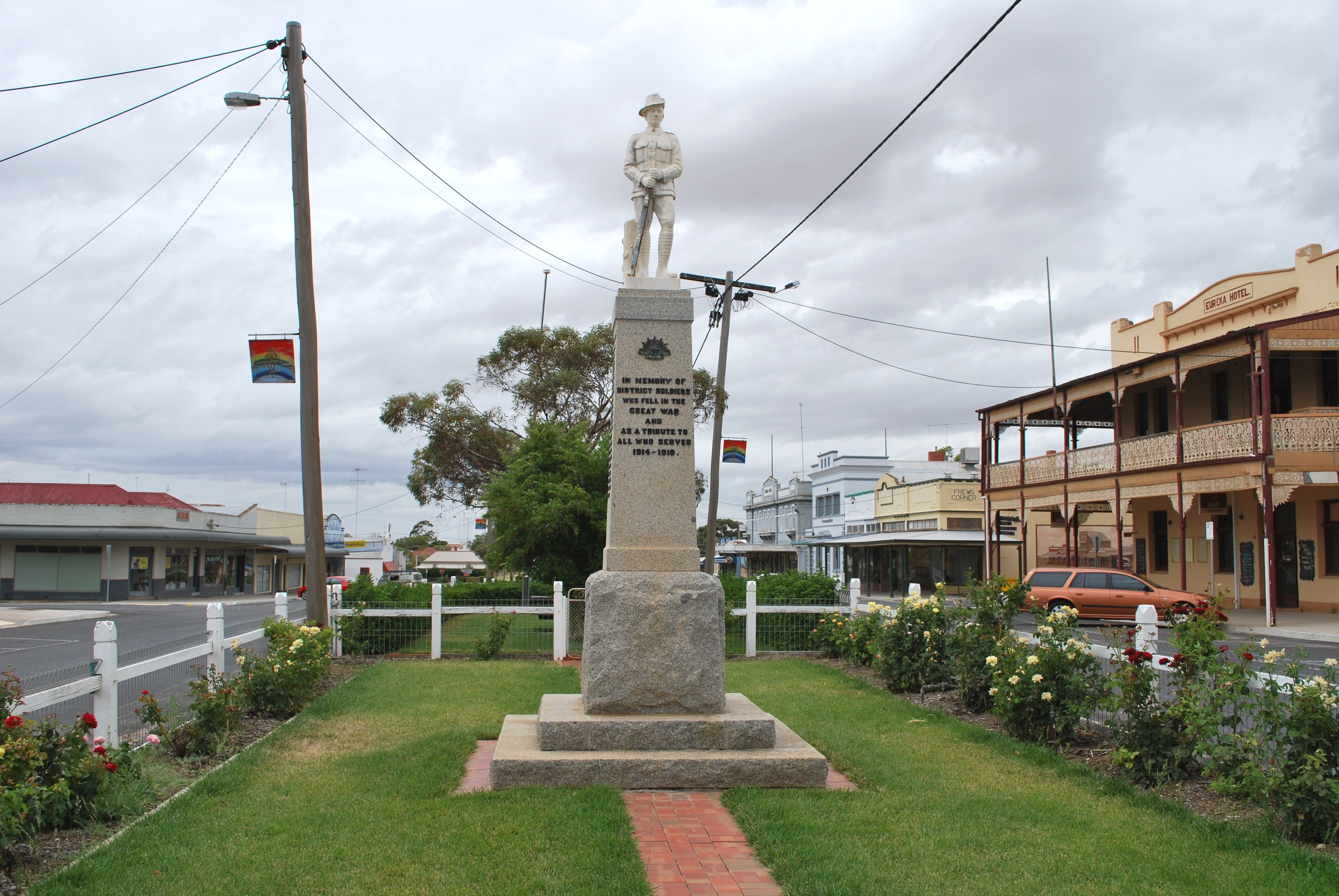
- War memorial in the main street

- Coordinates: 35°54′03″S 141°59′50″E
- Population: 683 (2016 census)
- Postcode(s): 3424
- Elevation: 88 m (289 ft)
- Location: 400 km (249 mi) NW of Melbourne; 428 km (266 mi) E of Adelaide; 105 km (65 mi) N of Horsham
- LGA(s): Shire of Hindmarsh
- State electorate(s): Mildura, Lowan
- Federal division(s): Mallee
Mean max temp	Mean min temp	Annual rainfall
22.6 °C; 73 °F	8.8 °C; 48 °F	355.7 mm 14 in

Rainbow is a town in the Shire of Hindmarsh in northwest Victoria, Australia, 400 kilometres (250 mi) from Melbourne. The nearest large towns are Warracknabeal, Dimboola and Nhill, all to the south. At the 2021 census, Rainbow had a population of 672.

== History ==
In 1899 the railway line was extended from Jeparit to a projected town site, Rainbow Rise, named after a sand lunette covered with wildflowers in the shape of a rainbow. A post office opened on 2 July 1900 and town blocks in Rainbow were sold in October 1900. By 1910 the township was referred to as the Metropolis of the Mallee.

Robert Riby owned and operated the first newspaper in Rainbow. He married Mary Anne Palethorp.

Rainbow was well known for its wheat. Silos still stand there and are visible from kilometres away.

Many of the town's original settlers were of German descent, and came across country from South Australia. In its early years, names such as Strauss, Petschel, Bretag, Rogasch, Fischer, Schumann, Schulz, Kruger and Heinrich were common, as well as the English names Dunn, Wallis, Smith, Brown, Fisher and Small.

The railway line transported wheat, other grains and passengers. In later years, it was used for freight only.

The Rainbow Magistrates' Court closed on 1 January 1983.

Rainbow was part of the Dimboola Shire until 25 January 1995, when the shire was united with the Lowan Shire.

The town was the subject of an episode of the ABC television program Enough Rope, with Andrew Denton, on 31 July 2006.

== Gauge ==
When the Melbourne to Adelaide main line was changed to standard gauge, the Rainbow branchline was also re-gauged.

== Today ==
Rainbow is a small commercial centre for the surrounding agricultural area. To its south is Victoria's largest freshwater lake, Lake Hindmarsh. To its north are Lake Albacutya, which is usually dry but a Ramsar-listed bird habitat; and Wyperfeld National Park. Rainbow is a useful base from which tourists, especially birdwatchers, can explore the surrounding region. It is notable for its unique main street, which incorporates a central strip of parkland.

Despite its remoteness, Rainbow prides itself on community involvement. There are football, netball, cricket, golf, bowls and volleyball clubs, arts groups, a community learning group, service clubs and a proactive town committee. Local businesses include a baker, butcher, chemist, modern supermarket, stock and station agents, a weekly newspaper (the Rainbow-Jeparit Argus) and a service station. There is also a police station.

With neighbouring townships Jeparit, Hopetoun, and Beulah, Rainbow has a football and netball club, the Southern Mallee Thunder, competing in the Wimmera Football Netball League.

Rainbow has one school, Rainbow P-12 College at 17 Albert Street. Established in January 2015 from the former primary and secondary schools, it serves students from nearby farms and towns, from Years foundation (prep) to 12 (VCE). The former Rainbow Primary School for younger students was co-located to the site of the secondary college in 2011, in a new $3.5 million building. P-12 college was established following a process of community consultation.

Golfers play at the course of the Rainbow Golf Club on Nhill Road.

In November 2022, owner Graham Francis registered Australia-wide the name "King Charles III Hotel" after recently renovating the hotel and painting it light-blue with white accenting and establishing an AirBNB. The hotel was established as the Kenmare Wine Saloon in 1894, before moving to Rainbow in 1906 when it officially became the Rainbow Royal Hotel.

== Population ==
- 0 (1911)
- 1,303 (1933)
- 829 (1954)
- 587 (1991)
- 497 (2006)
- 525 (2011)
- 683 (2016)

== Climate ==
Climate data for Rainbow, Victoria, elevation 88 m (289 ft)
Month	Jan	Feb	Mar	Apr	May	Jun	Jul	Aug	Sep	Oct	Nov	Dec	Year
Mean daily maximum °C (°F)	30.8 (87.4)	30.4 (86.7)	27.6 (81.7)	22.3 (72.1)	18.0 (64.4)	14.7 (58.5)	14.4 (57.9)	16.1 (61.0)	19.3 (66.7)	22.7 (72.9)	26.0 (78.8)	29.2 (84.6)	22.6 (72.7)
Mean daily minimum °C (°F)	13.7 (56.7)	14.1 (57.4)	12.2 (54.0)	9.1 (48.4)	6.6 (43.9)	4.5 (40.1)	3.8 (38.8)	4.4 (39.9)	5.9 (42.6)	7.9 (46.2)	10.2 (50.4)	12.5 (54.5)	8.7 (47.7)
Average rainfall mm (inches)	22.3 (0.88)	25.8 (1.02)	20.5 (0.81)	25.2 (0.99)	36.0 (1.42)	35.4 (1.39)	36.2 (1.43)	37.1 (1.46)	35.2 (1.39)	34.1 (1.34)	29.7 (1.17)	27.5 (1.08)	364.7 (14.36)
Average rainy days (≥ 1.0 mm)	2.4	2.4	2.6	3.8	6.1	6.5	8.0	7.5	6.3	5.5	4.2	3.1	58.4
Source: Australian Bureau of Meteorology
