= Glenlee, Victoria =

Glenlee Victoria
- Coordinates: 36°13′43″S 141°50′28″E
- Population: 71 (2021 census)
- Postcode(s): 3418
- LGA(s): Shire of Hindmarsh
- State electorate(s): Lowan
- Federal division(s): Mallee

Glenlee is a locality in the Shire of Hindmarsh, Victoria, Australia. At the 2021 census, Glenlee had a population of 71.
