= Broughton, Victoria =

Broughton
- Town
- Coordinates: 36°10′1″S 141°21′9″E
- Country: Australia
- State: Victoria
- LGAs: Shire of West Wimmera; Shire of Hindmarsh

Government
  - State electorate: Mildura
  - Federal division: Mallee

Population
  - Total: 145 (2016 census)
- Postcode: 3319

Broughton is a locality in West Wimmera Shire and the Shire of Hindmarsh in Victoria, Australia. The locality was named after the Broughton family who owned several properties in the area.
