= Kenmare, Victoria =

Kenmare Victoria
- Coordinates: 35°54′37″S 142°12′11″E
- Population: 0 (2021 census)
- Postcode(s): 3395
- LGA(s): Shire of Hindmarsh
- State electorate(s): Lowan
- Federal division(s): Mallee

Kenmare is a locality in the Shire of Hindmarsh, Victoria, Australia. At the 2021 census, Kenmare had a population of 0.

Kenmare State School was built in 1903 from local limestone and closed in 1982.
