= Jeparit =

- Town
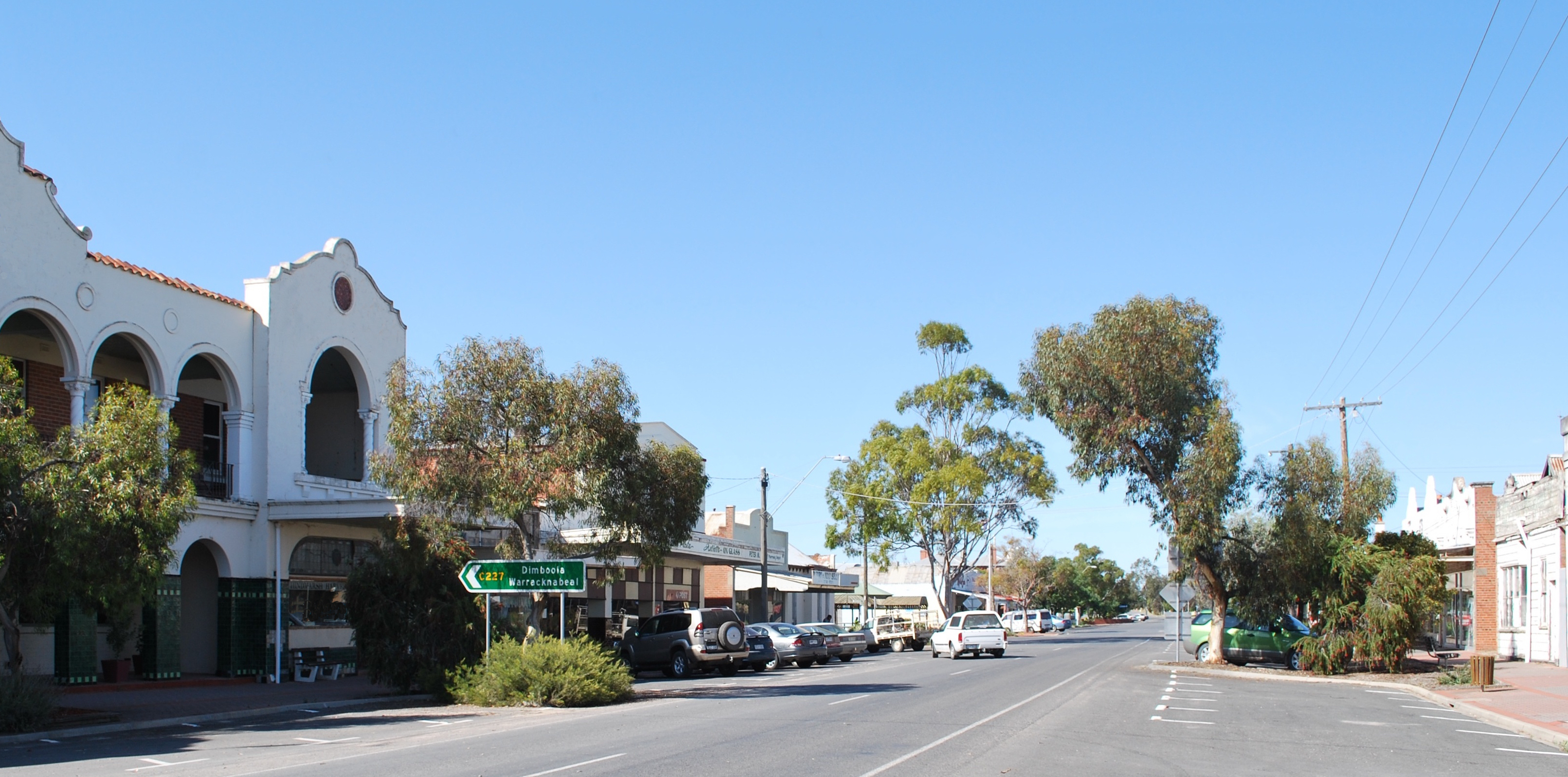
- Roy Street, the main street of Jeparit

- Coordinates: 36°08′0″S 141°59′0″E
- Country: Australia
- State: Victoria
- LGA: Shire of Hindmarsh
- Location: 375 km (233 mi) NW of Melbourne; 73 km (45 mi) N of Horsham; 46 km (29 mi) W of Warracknabeal; 38 km (24 mi) N of Dimboola

Government
  - State electorate: Lowan
  - Federal division: Mallee
- Elevation: 85 m (279 ft)

Population
  - Total: 342 (2016 census)
- Postcode: 3423
- Mean max temp: 22.3 °C (72.1 °F)
- Mean min temp: 8.6 °C (47.5 °F)
- Annual rainfall: 381.9 mm (15.04 in)

Jeparit (/dʒəˈpærɪt/ jə-PARR-it) is a town on the Wimmera River in Western Victoria, Australia, 370 kilometres (230 mi) north west of Melbourne. At the 2016 census Jeparit had a population of 342, down from 394 five years earlier.

== History ==
The area around Jeparit is originally home to the Gromiluk Aboriginal peoples prior to European settlement. The name Jeparit is believed to be derived from a Gromiluk word meaning "home of small birds". European settlement began in the 1880s when German Lutheran immigrants began to settle and grow wheat.

The town was surveyed in 1883 and gazetted in 1889, the post office opening on 31 August 1889 though known as Lake Hindmarsh until December 1889. Two earlier post offices called Lake Hindmarsh had existed in the area at various times since 1861 to serve a smaller population of graziers.

Jeparit's most famous resident is former Australian Prime Minister and founder of the Liberal Party, Sir Robert Menzies, who was born in the town in 1894. He is commemorated with a spire and a memorial bust installed at the town square. The spire, topped with an ornament resembling a Scottish Thistle, is inscribed:

This spire has been erected by the people of Jeparit and district, to honour Sir Robert Menzies. The spire symbolises the rise to world recognition of a boy who was born in Jeparit and who rose by his own efforts to become Australia's Prime Minister and a statesman recognised and honoured throughout the world.

Jeparit is the setting for Peter Carey's 1985 novel Illywhacker.

== Climate ==
Climate data for Jeparit, elevation 81 m (266 ft)
Month	Jan	Feb	Mar	Apr	May	Jun	Jul	Aug	Sep	Oct	Nov	Dec	Year
Record high °C (°F)	46.1 (115.0)	45.0 (113.0)	40.0 (104.0)	34.4 (93.9)	29.5 (85.1)	22.8 (73.0)	25.7 (78.3)	26.6 (79.9)	30.9 (87.6)	36.2 (97.2)	40.6 (105.1)	43.2 (109.8)	46.1 (115.0)
Mean daily maximum °C (°F)	30.7 (87.3)	30.2 (86.4)	27.6 (81.7)	22.2 (72.0)	17.9 (64.2)	14.4 (57.9)	14.0 (57.2)	15.6 (60.1)	18.9 (66.0)	22.3 (72.1)	25.6 (78.1)	28.9 (84.0)	22.4 (72.3)
Mean daily minimum °C (°F)	13.5 (56.3)	13.6 (56.5)	11.7 (53.1)	8.8 (47.8)	6.5 (43.7)	4.4 (39.9)	4.0 (39.2)	4.6 (40.3)	6.1 (43.0)	7.9 (46.2)	10.0 (50.0)	12.2 (54.0)	8.6 (47.5)
Record low °C (°F)	1.7 (35.1)	5.6 (42.1)	1.7 (35.1)	0.6 (33.1)	−2.2 (28.0)	−3.3 (26.1)	−3.3 (26.1)	−2.3 (27.9)	−0.7 (30.7)	−1.0 (30.2)	3.3 (37.9)	4.1 (39.4)	−3.3 (26.1)
Average rainfall mm (inches)	22.5 (0.89)	24.5 (0.96)	20.6 (0.81)	25.6 (1.01)	38.1 (1.50)	40.0 (1.57)	38.7 (1.52)	40.4 (1.59)	39.7 (1.56)	36.7 (1.44)	29.2 (1.15)	27.2 (1.07)	383.2 (15.09)
Average rainy days (≥ 1.0 mm)	2.5	2.5	2.7	3.7	6.3	7.5	8.5	8.5	7.3	5.9	4.2	3.2	62.8
Source: Australian Bureau of Meteorology

== Sport ==
Golfers play at the course of the Jeparit Golf Club on Nhill Road.

=== Jeparit Football Club ===
The Jeparit Football Club appears to have first played a game of Australian Rules Football against Dimboola in June 1899 at Jeparit. The club wore black and white stripes in their 1929 and 1934 North Wimmera Football Association premiership photos. When the club joined the Wimmera Football League in 1937, the club wore the red and black colours.

1928 Stawell Gift winner, Lynch Cooper played football with the Jeparit Football Club.

Senior Football Premierships

- North Wimmera FA
  - 1925 - Jeparit: 7.11 - 53 d Yaapeet: 4.8 - 32
  - 1926 - Jeparit: 3.10 - 28 d Rainbow: 2.7 - 19
  - 1929 - Jeparit: 6.12 - 48 d Peppers Plain: 5.8 - 38
  - 1932 - Jeparit: 13.21 - 99 d Rainbow: 4.8 - 32
  - 1933 - Jeparit: 13.12 - 90 d Rainbow: 12.10 - 82
  - 1934 - Jeparit: 13.14 - 92 d Rainbow: 7.10 - 52
- Mid Wimmera FA
  - 1936 - Jeparit: 16.22 - 118 d Murtoa: 9.9 - 63

In November 1995, Jeparit FC merged with the Rainbow FC to form the Jeparit Rainbow "Lakers" FNC and played in the Southern Mallee Football League from 1996 to 2014. The club then played in the Horsham District Football League from 2015 to 2023.

From 2024, along with neighbouring townships Rainbow, Hopetoun, and Beulah, Jeparit has a football and netball club called the Southern Mallee Thunder, competing in the Wimmera Football Netball League.
