= Yanac =

Yanac Victoria
- Coordinates: 36°08′06″S 141°26′11″E
- Population: 69 (2021 census)
- Postcode(s): 3418
- LGA(s): Shire of Hindmarsh
- State electorate(s): Lowan
- Federal division(s): Mallee

Yanac is a town in the Shire of Hindmarsh, Victoria, Australia. At the 2021 census, Yanac had a population of 69.

== History ==
Yanac takes its name from the Yanac-a-Yanac pastoral run, established in 1846 near the Yanac Swamp. The Swamp is believed to have inspired the area's name, potentially derived from an Aboriginal expression referring to bats flying at night. European settlement in the Yanac district began in the late 1870s, with the opening of a school at Yanac South in 1880. Churches, including a Methodist church in 1887 and a Lutheran church in 1905, were established near what would later become the town.

The opening of Yanac railway station in 1916 contributed to Yanac's development as a local center, with facilities such as storage buildings and railway housing. A public hall was constructed in 1921. Infrastructure included grain silos, a general store, and a recreation reserve. However, by the 1990s, most institutions had closed. Today, Yanac retains its public hall, a Uniting Church, and remnants of its historical infrastructure.
