= Kiata =

- Town
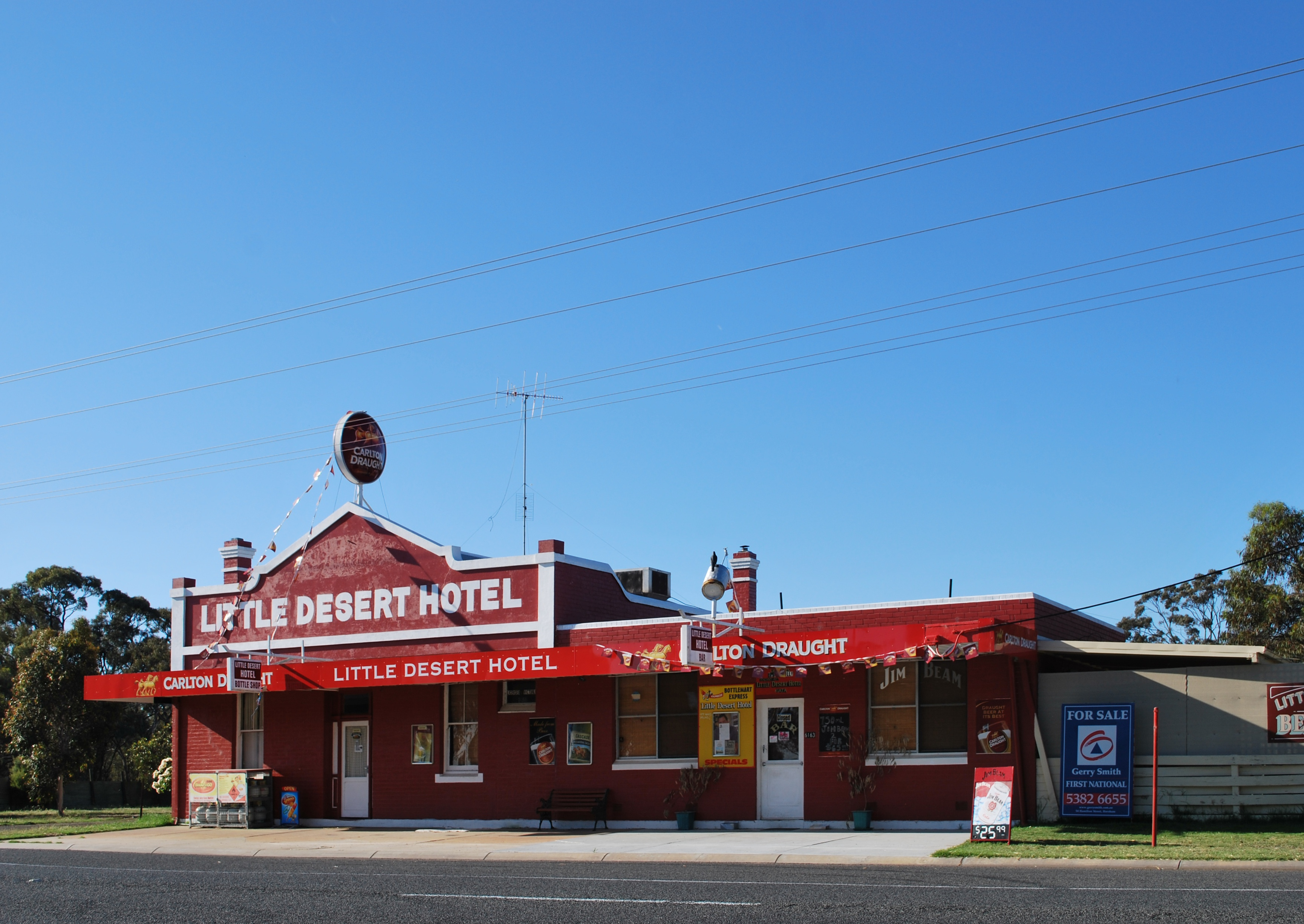
- Little Desert Hotel, 2010

- Coordinates: 36°22′0″S 141°47′0″E
- Country: Australia
- State: Victoria
- LGA: Shire of Hindmarsh
- Location: 359 km (223 mi) NW of Melbourne; 61 km (38 mi) NW of Horsham; 14 km (8.7 mi) E of Nhill

Government
  - State electorate: Lowan
  - Federal division: Mallee

Population
  - Total: 62 (2016 census)
- Postcode: 3418

Kiata is a town in the Wimmera region of western Victoria, Australia. The town is 359 kilometres (223 mi) north-west of the state capital of Melbourne, on the Western Highway. The population at the 2011 census was 251.

The Kiata Wind Farm is located nearby.

== Facilities ==
The only hotel in town is the Little Desert Hotel, which is open for meals on Fridays and Saturdays. Kiata is also home to Inverness Motors, a museum of collectable and vintage cars. The Kiata Camp Ground is located south of the town, on the edge of the Little Desert National Park.

There is also a craft shop, and situated next door to that is the Kiata hall, now privately owned. Kiata also has "The Pines" picnic area on the edge of the Kiata Flora Reserve.

Kiata railway station was opened on 19 January 1887, along with the line from Dimboola to Serviceton. The station was closed to passenger and goods traffic in August 1970.
