= Dimboola =

- Town
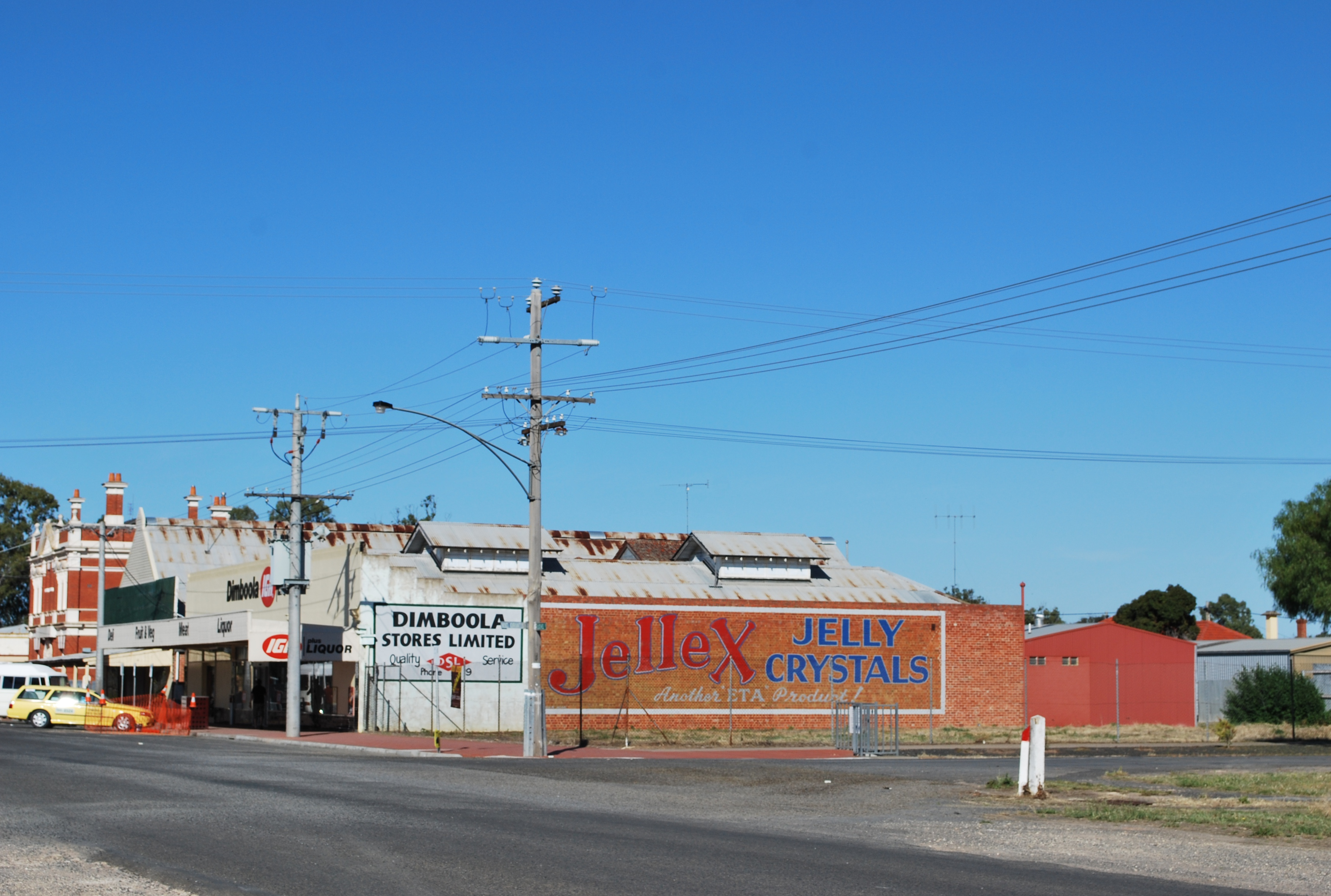
- Shops in Dimboola

- Coordinates: 36°27′0″S 142°01′0″E
- Country: Australia
- State: Victoria
- LGA: Shire of Hindmarsh
- Location: 337 km (209 mi) from Melbourne; 391 km (243 mi) from Adelaide; 39 km (24 mi) from Horsham; 39 km (24 mi) from Nhill

Government
  - State electorate: Lowan
  - Federal division: Mallee

Population
  - Total: 1,424 (2016 census)
- Postcode: 3414

Dimboola is a town in the Shire of Hindmarsh in the Wimmera region of western Victoria, Australia, 334 kilometres north-west of Melbourne.

== History ==
Situated on the Wimmera River, Dimboola was previously known as 'Nine Creeks'. Following a survey conducted in late 1862 by contractor Frederick Smith of Ararat, a plan for a township in the County of Dimboola was proposed. It was first recognised as being a township when mentioned in the April 1863 edition of the Government Gazette.

Before the arrival of white people into the district, the Aboriginal people called the area Watchegatcheca which had the meaning 'Wattle Tree and White Cockatoos'. The name 'Dimboola' has generally been accepted to have come from the Sinhalese word "dimbula" meaning 'Land of Figs'. The name came from the District Surveyor of the time John George Winchester Wilmot, who had previously lived in Ceylon (now Sri Lanka). The relationship of the name to this area is suggested to have come from 'Upper Regions Station' where an abundance of fruit trees grew in the garden, many of which were figs.

The Post Office opened on 3 April 1863, but was known as Nine Creeks until 1869.

The Dimboola Magistrates' Court closed on 1 January 1983.

Dimboola's economy is predominantly rural, with wheat, sheep and timber being traditionally important. There have been recent forays into emu and alpaca rearing and olive plantations.

Paintings of Dimboola landscapes by noted Australian painter Sidney Nolan, who was stationed in the area while on army duty in World War II, can be found in the National Gallery of Victoria. Dimboola is also the setting of the play (and subsequent film) Dimboola by Jack Hibberd.

Distinguished Australian-British physicist Richard Dalitz was born in Dimboola, as was World War II nursing matron Olive Dorothy Paschke.

The Dimboola Show is held on the third Thursday in October and coincides with Caulfield Cup Day.

In January 2025, a bushfire thought to have started from a lightning strike spread across the Little Desert, In one day roughly 65,000 hectares of land was burnt down and by the time it ended it burned over 95,000 hectares.The town of dimboola was also issued a evacuation warning to exit the town to prevent death. A notable building that burned down was the little desert lodge which was a popular wedding venue.

== Traditional ownership ==
The formally recognised traditional owners for the area in which Dimboola sits are the Wotjobaluk, Jaadwa, Jadawadjali, Wergaia and Jupagik nations. These Nations are represented by the Barengi Gadjin Land Council Aboriginal Corporation. The local language is Wergaia.

== Demographics ==
As of the 2016 census, 1,424 people resided in Dimboola. The median age of persons in Dimboola was 52 years. Children aged 0–14 years made up 14.3% of the population. People over the age of 65 years made up 29% of the population There were more females than males with 53% of the population female and 47% male. The average household size is 2.1 persons per household. The average number of children per family for families with children is 1.8.

82.0% of people were born in Australia. Of all persons living in Dimboola, 3.4% (48 persons) were Aboriginal and/or Torres Strait Islander people. This is higher than for both the state of Victoria (0.8%) and the national average (2.8%). The most common ancestries in Dimboola were Australian 31.7%, English 29.5%, German 9.2%, Scottish 8.3%, and Irish 6.7%.

== Education ==
There is a range of education options available in Dimboola. There is one kindergarten, two primary schools and one secondary college.

St Peter's Primary School and Dimboola Primary School are the two primary education providers.

The town's secondary college is the only purpose-built memorial secondary college in Victoria, hence its name, Dimboola Memorial Secondary College. It offers VCE and VCAL courses for senior year levels and currently has an enrolment of around 160 students.

As of the 2016 census, of the people aged 15 and over in Dimboola, 8.4% completed year 12, and 16.4% completed year 10 as their highest level of educational attainment.

== Transport ==
V/Line coach services depart from the rear of the Old Shire Hall in Lloyd Street. These travel to both Melbourne and Adelaide.

Dimboola railway station is served by The Overland passenger rail services between Melbourne and Adelaide, twice weekly in each direction.

== Sport ==
Dimboola has an Australian rules football team competing in the Wimmera Football League.

Other sports clubs include hockey, tennis, netball, rowing and badminton.

Golfers play at the Dimboola Golf Club on Riverside.

Dimboola is home to a state-of-the-art synthetic hockey pitch lined for both hockey and tennis.

== Tourist attractions ==
- Pink Lake, a picturesque salt lake north of Dimboola, also known as the Pink lake of Victoria.
- Little Desert National Park
- Wimmera River
