= Loddon Campaspe (region) =

Region of Victoria, Australia

- Region

- Coordinates: 36°44′S 144°11′E
- Country: Australia
- State: Victoria
- Region: Loddon Mallee
- LGA: Bendigo; Campaspe; Loddon; Mount Alexander; Central Goldfields; Macedon Ranges

Government
  - State electorate: Bendigo East; Bendigo West; Euroa; Macedon; Murray Plains; Ripon
  - Federal division: Bendigo; Mallee; McEwen; Nicholls

Area (Note: Area figure is the combined area of all LGAs in the region)
  - Total: 19,026 km^{2} (7,346 sq mi)

Population
  - Total: 253,158 (2021 census) (Note: Population figure is the combined population of all LGAs in the region)
  - Density: 13.3059/km^{2} (34.4621/sq mi)

Loddon Campaspe is a geographic and economic region located in central Victoria, Australia. It is one of two subregions that make up the broader Loddon Mallee region, the other being the Mallee. The region includes six local government areas and is recognised for its historical significance, population growth, diverse economy, and cultural and environmental assets.

== Geography and location ==
Loddon Campaspe lies in the centre of Victoria, stretching from the outskirts of Melbourne in the south to the Murray River in the north. The region encompasses six local government areas:

- City of Greater Bendigo
- Shire of Campaspe
- Shire of Loddon
- Mount Alexander Shire
- Shire of Central Goldfields
- Shire of Macedon Ranges

The regional centre is Bendigo, which serves as a hub for administration, health, education, and economic activity. The southern part of the region includes fast-growing peri-urban areas such as Kyneton, Gisborne, and Woodend. These towns are increasingly connected to Melbourne through road and rail infrastructure, making them popular with commuters.

In the north, the region reaches the Murray River, where towns such as Echuca and Rochester are located. These areas contribute to cross-border trade and tourism with New South Wales.

== Traditional custodians ==
The Loddon Campaspe region is situated on the lands of several traditional owner groups. These include the Dja Dja Wurrung, Taungurung, Wurundjeri, and Yorta Yorta peoples, along with other Aboriginal groups not formally recognised. These groups have maintained a deep connection to the land for thousands of years through language, cultural practice, and custodianship.

== Population and demographics ==
The estimated population of Loddon Campaspe is over 253,000 people. The population is expected to grow to over 300,000 by 2036, largely driven by the growth of Bendigo and peri-urban towns near Melbourne.

Key demographic features include:

- A median age of 42, which is older than the state average.
- Around 20 percent of the population is aged 65 or older.
- 1.5 percent identify as Aboriginal or Torres Strait Islander.
- Approximately 4.4 percent speak a language other than English at home.
- Only 0.7 percent of residents report low English proficiency.

Bendigo is the largest population centre, followed by Echuca, Castlemaine, and Kyneton. Smaller towns such as Heathcote, Inglewood, and Maryborough also serve as important service centres.

== Economy and industry ==
The regional economy has a Gross Regional Product (GRP) of approximately AUD 11.6 billion and features a diverse industrial base. Economic activity is supported by strong linkages between agriculture, food manufacturing, health services, education, and tourism.

Major industries include:

- Agriculture and Agribusiness: The region is known for broadacre farming, horticulture, livestock, and viticulture. The Heathcote wine region and Harcourt orchards are notable contributors to local and export markets.
- Manufacturing: Food and fibre manufacturing is a growth sector, supported by proximity to raw materials and strong transport links.
- Tourism: Cultural heritage, natural parks, and events draw visitors to the region. The Bendigo Art Gallery, Echuca Wharf, and goldfields history continue to attract significant tourism.
- Mining: Gold mining remains active, with major operations located in the Bendigo region.
- Education and Health Services: These sectors are growing, especially in Bendigo, which hosts campuses of La Trobe University and Bendigo TAFE, as well as the Bendigo Health precinct.

== Strategic planning and development ==
Regional Economic Development Strategy (REDS)

The Loddon Campaspe REDS, released in 2022, provides a long-term strategic plan for economic growth. The strategy identifies five main directions:

1. Increase value-adding in agriculture and food manufacturing.
2. Diversify tourism through investment in natural and cultural attractions.
3. Enhance innovation and entrepreneurship through regional corridors.
4. Improve workforce development through stronger education and industry links.
5. Develop emerging sectors such as renewable energy, waste processing, and minerals.

== Employment and innovation corridor ==
A key initiative is the Loddon Campaspe Employment and Innovation Corridor, which connects Bendigo to surrounding towns such as Echuca and Kyneton. This corridor aims to support job creation, population growth, improved transport, and innovation in regional industries.

== Regional governance ==
The Loddon Campaspe Regional Partnership is one of nine regional partnerships established by the Victorian Government. It brings together community leaders, Traditional Owners, local government, and state government representatives to identify and advocate for regional priorities.

Some major programs supported by the partnership include:

- Healthy Loddon Campaspe, which promotes physical activity and public health.
- The KIT Van and App, a mobile and digital tool supporting youth mental health.
- A Regional Digital Plan, which aims to improve connectivity and digital literacy across the region.

== Education and workforce development ==
Education and training services are delivered across a network of schools, TAFE institutes, and university campuses. Key providers include:

- La Trobe University (Bendigo Campus), offering undergraduate and postgraduate degrees.
- Bendigo TAFE, which operates across multiple campuses and offers vocational training aligned with regional industry needs.
- Local secondary schools and alternative education programs in every major town.

Workforce development is a focus area for economic planning, particularly in health, construction, manufacturing, and agriculture. Partnerships between educational institutions and industry bodies aim to address skills shortages and prepare workers for future economic trends.

== Cultural heritage and tourism ==
The region has a strong cultural identity rooted in Aboriginal heritage, the gold rush era, and agricultural life. Bendigo is one of Australia's most prominent regional arts and cultural centres, hosting exhibitions, festivals, and multicultural events.

Popular tourism assets include:

- Bendigo Art Gallery and Golden Dragon Museum
- Historic goldfields towns like Castlemaine, Maldon, and Maryborough
- Echuca Wharf and Murray River cruises
- Heathcote wine region and local food trails

Eco-tourism is also expanding, with opportunities to explore national parks, forests, and walking trails across the Macedon Ranges, Mount Alexander, and Loddon River systems.

== Transport and infrastructure ==
Transport infrastructure supports mobility and economic development across the region. Key features include:

- Calder Freeway, which connects Bendigo to Melbourne.
- Midland and Northern Highways, linking towns across the region.
- V/Line rail services from Melbourne to Bendigo, Kyneton, Castlemaine, and Echuca.
- Public transport services in Bendigo and town bus services in larger regional centres.
- Future investment plans in freight terminals, digital infrastructure, and road upgrades.

== Environment and climate ==
Loddon Campaspe features a mix of agricultural land, dry forests, river systems, and mountain ranges. The region is experiencing the effects of climate change, including higher average temperatures, changing rainfall patterns, and increased bushfire risk.

Conservation efforts focus on:

- Protecting endangered flora and fauna in regional parks.
- Promoting sustainable land and water use in agriculture.
- Reducing carbon emissions through energy efficiency and renewables.

The region is also investing in local circular economy initiatives and supporting waste management innovation.

== See also ==
- Geography of Victoria
- Regions of Victoria
