= Grampian (disambiguation) =

The Grampians are a mountain range in Scotland.

Grampian or Grampians may also refer to:

In Scotland:

- Grampian Regional Council, a former local government region of Scotland
- Grampian Television (now STV North), the ITV licensee for Northern Scotland

In Australia:

- Grampians (region), an administrative economic region in Victoria, Australia
- Grampians National Park, a national park in Victoria, Australia
- Grampians wine region, a wine region near the national park in Victoria, Australia

In Canada:

- Grampian Marine Limited, a Canadian boat builder

In New Zealand:

- Grampian Mountains, a mountain range on the southeastern border of the Mackenzie Basin
- The Grampians (New Zealand), a range of hills in Nelson, New Zealand

In the United States of America:

- Grampian, Pennsylvania, a borough in Pennsylvania

== Ships ==
- SS Grampian ship built 1907. Sold for scrap in 1925.

== See also ==
- Grampian phase, part of the Caledonian orogeny mountain building era
