= Loddon Mallee =

Economic region of Victoria, Australia

Loddon Mallee Region
- Region
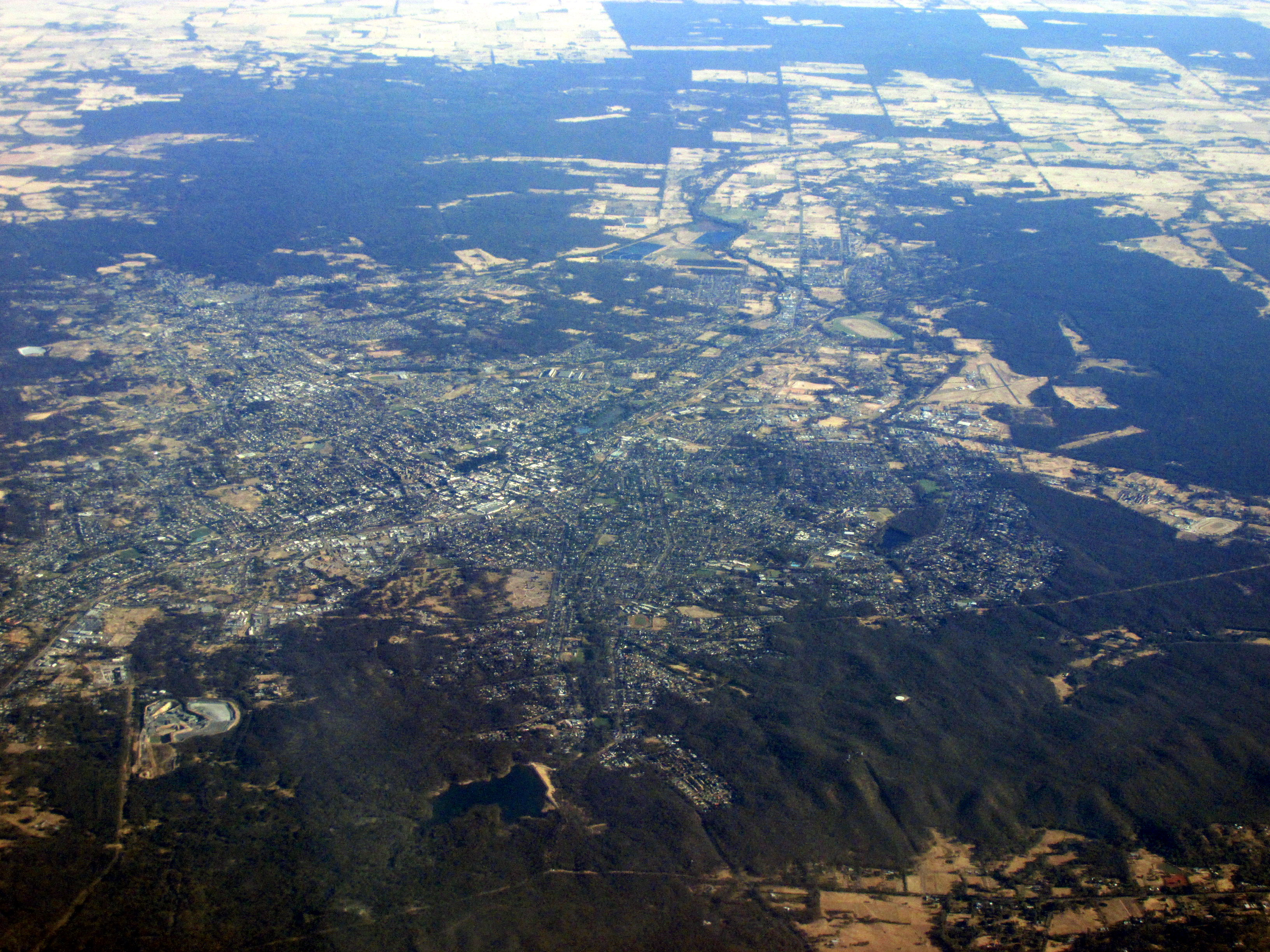
- Aerial view of Bendigo and surrounding areas.

- Coordinates: 36°45′S 144°16′E
- Country: Australia
- State: Victoria
- LGA: (by population); Greater Bendigo; Mildura; Macedon Ranges; Campaspe; Swan Hill; Mount Alexander; Central Goldfields; Gannawarra; Loddon; Buloke

Government
  - State electorate: Bendigo East; Bendigo West; Euroa; Macedon; Mildura; Murray Plains; Ripon
  - Federal division: Bendigo; Mallee; McEwen; Nicholls

Area (Note: Area figure is the combined area of all LGAs in the region)
  - Total: 58,959 km^{2} (22,764 sq mi)

Population
  - Total: 348,394 (2021 census) (Note: Population figure is the combined population of all LGAs in the region)
  - Density: 5.90909/km^{2} (15.30447/sq mi)
- Time zone: UTC+10 (AEST)
  - Summer (DST): UTC+11 (AEDT)
- Website: Loddon Mallee Region
Regions around Loddon Mallee Region
South Australia	New South Wales	New South Wales
South Australia	Loddon Mallee Region	Hume
Grampians	Grampians	Greater Melbourne

The Loddon Mallee is an economic rural region located in the north-western part of Victoria, Australia. Occupying more than a quarter of the state, it stretches from Greater Melbourne to the northernmost point of Victoria, sharing a border with South Australia and New South Wales, and has one of the most consistently warm climates in Victoria. It has two major regional cities Bendigo and Mildura and also contains the major settlements of Castlemaine, Echuca, Gisborne, Kerang, Kyneton, Maryborough, Swan Hill, Wedderburn and Wycheproof.

Comprising an area in excess of 58,000 square kilometres (22,000 sq mi) this is the largest region in Victoria hosting a population of over 348,000 people. The Loddon Malle region includes the Shire of Buloke, Shire of Campaspe, Shire of Central Goldfields, Shire of Gannawarra, City of Greater Bendigo, Shire of Loddon, Shire of Macedon Ranges, Rural City of Mildura, Shire of Mount Alexander and Rural City of Swan Hill local government areas.

The Loddon Mallee region is located along two major transport corridors, the Calder Highway corridor linking Melbourne to Bendigo and Mildura and the interstate Sturt Highway corridor linking Sydney to Mildura and Adelaide. The region comprises two distinct and inter-connected sub-regions or districts: Loddon Campaspe and Mallee.

== Administration ==
=== Political representation ===
For the purposes of Australian federal elections for the House of Representatives, the Loddon Mallee region is contained within all or part of the electoral divisions of Bendigo, Mallee, McEwen and Nicholls.

For the purposes of Victorian elections for the Legislative Assembly, the Loddon Mallee region is contained within all or part of the electoral districts of Bendigo East, Bendigo West, Euroa, Macedon, Mildura, Murray Plains and Ripon.

==== Local government areas ====
The region contains ten local government areas, which are:

Loddon Mallee region LGA populations
Local government area	Area		Population (2016 census)	Source(s)	Population (2021 census)	Source(s)
Local government area	km^{2}	sq mi	Population (2016 census)	Source(s)	Population (2021 census)	Source(s)
Shire of Buloke	8,000	3,100	6,201		6,178	
Shire of Campaspe	4,519	1,745	37,061		38,735	
Shire of Central Goldfields	1,533	592	12,995		13,483	
Shire of Gannawarra	3,735	1,442	10,549		10,683	
City of Greater Bendigo	3,000	1,200	110,477		121,470	
Shire of Loddon	6,696	2,585	7,516		7,759	
Shire of Macedon Ranges	1,748	675	46,100		51,458	
Rural City of Mildura	22,083	8,526	53,878		56,972	
Shire of Mount Alexander	1,530	590	18,761		20,253	
Rural City of Swan Hill	6,115	2,361	20,584		21,403	
Totals	58,959	22,764	324,122		348,394	

=== Environmental protection ===
The Loddon Malle region contains the Murray Sunset National Park, Big Desert Wilderness Park, Wyperfeld National Park, Hattah - Kulkyne National Park, Kooyoora State Park and Greater Bendigo National Park.

== See also ==
- Geography of Victoria
- Regions of Victoria
