= Grampians (region) =

Economic region of Victoria, Australia

Grampians Region
- Region
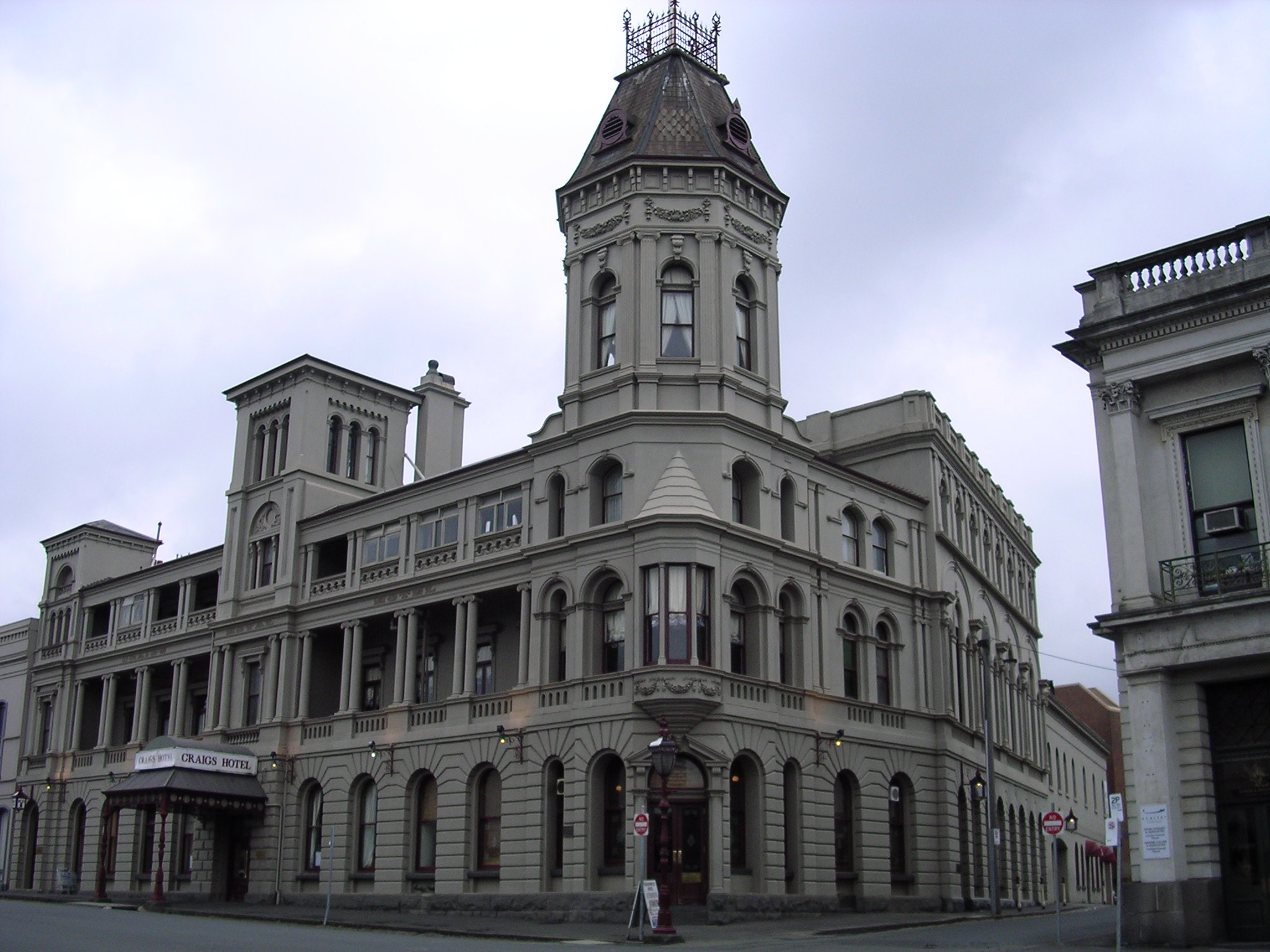
- Craigs Hotel, Lydiard Street, Ballarat.

- Coordinates: 37°16′S 142°26′E
- Country: Australia
- State: Victoria
- LGA: (by population); Ballarat; Moorabool; Horsham; Golden Plains; Hepburn; Northern Grampians; Ararat; Yarriambiack; Pyrenees; Hindmarsh; West Wimmera
- Location: 200 km (120 mi) W of Melbourne

Government
  - State electorate: Eureka; Lowan; Melton; Mildura; Murray Plains; Polwarth; Ripon; Wendouree
  - Federal division: Ballarat; Corangamite; Mallee; Wannon

Area
  - Total: 48,646 km^{2} (18,782 sq mi)

Population
  - Total: 236,739 (2016 census) (Note: Population figure is the combined population of all LGAs in the region)
  - Density: 4.86657/km^{2} (12.60435/sq mi)
- Time zone: UTC+10:00 (AEST)
  - Summer (DST): UTC+11:00 (AEDT)
Regions around Grampians Region
| Loddon Mallee | Loddon Mallee | Loddon Mallee |
| South Australia | Grampians Region | Greater Melbourne |
| Barwon South West | Barwon South West | Barwon South West |

The Grampians is an economic rural region located in the western part of Victoria, Australia. The 48,646-square-kilometre (18,782 sq mi) region lies to the northwest of the western suburbs of Greater Melbourne, to the state's western border with South Australia and includes the Grampians National Park and significant gold mining heritage assets. The Grampians region has two sub-regions: the Central Highlands and Wimmera Southern Mallee.

As at the 2016 Australian census, the Grampians region had a population of 236,739, with almost half of the population located in the City of Ballarat. The principal centres of the region, in descending order of population, are Ballarat, Bacchus Marsh, Horsham, Ararat, and Stawell.

== Administration ==
=== Political representation ===
For the purposes of Australian federal elections for the House of Representatives, the Grampians region is contained within all or part of the electoral divisions of Ballarat, Corangamite, Mallee, and Wannon.

For the purposes of Victorian elections for the Legislative Assembly, the Grampians region is contained within all or part of the electoral districts of Buninyong, Lowan, Melton, Mildura, Murray Plains, Polwarth, Ripon and Wendouree.

==== Local government areas ====
The region contains eleven local government areas, which are:

Grampians region LGA populations
| Local government area | Area | | Population (2011 census) | Source(s) | Population (2016 census) | Source(s) |
| Local government area | km^{2} | sq mi | Population (2011 census) | Source(s) | Population (2016 census) | Source(s) |
|---|---|---|---|---|---|---|
| Rural City of Ararat | 4,230 | 1,630 | 11,183 | | 11,600 | |
| City of Ballarat | 740 | 290 | 93,501 | | 101,686 | |
| Golden Plains Shire | 2,704 | 1,044 | 18,770 | | 21,688 | |
| Shire of Hepburn | 1,470 | 570 | 14,367 | | 15,330 | |
| Shire of Hindmarsh | 7,527 | 2,906 | 5,798 | | 5,721 | |
| Rural City of Horsham | 4,249 | 1,641 | 19,279 | | 19,642 | |
| Shire of Moorabool | 2,110 | 810 | 28,124 | | 31,818 | |
| Shire of Northern Grampians | 5,918 | 2,285 | 11,845 | | 11,439 | |
| Shire of Pyrenees | 3,433 | 1,325 | 6,669 | | 7,238 | |
| Shire of West Wimmera | 9,107 | 3,516 | 4,251 | | 3,903 | |
| Shire of Yarriambiack | 7,158 | 2,764 | 7,088 | | 6,674 | |
| Totals | 48,646 | 18,782 | 220,875 | | 236,739 | |

== Food and Wine Festival ==
The Grampians Region is home to one of Australia's longest running food and wine festivals, Grampians Grape Escape, held over the first weekend of May in Halls Gap every year. Launched in 1992, the Grampians Grape Escape is a hallmark event for Victoria and provides food and wine offerings by more than 100 local artisan producers, live music and family entertainment.

=== Environmental protection ===
The Grampians region contains the Grampians National Park and Little Desert National Park.

== See also ==
- Geography of Victoria
- Regions of Victoria
