= List of regions of Australia =

This is a list of regions of Australia that are not Australian states or territories. The most commonly known regionalisation is the governmental division of the state into regions for economic development purposes.

Others regionalisations include those made for purposes of land management, such as agriculture or conservation; information gathering, such as statistical or meteorological. Although most regionalisations were defined for specific purposes and give specific boundaries, many regions will have similar names and extents across different regionalisations. As a result, the names and boundaries of regions can vary and may overlap in popular places.

Not all the regions in this list have official status as an economic or administrative region.

== Types of Australian regionalisation ==
A regionalisation of Australia is a system by which Australia is divided into regions. There are a great many different regionalisations, created for a range of purposes, including political, administrative, statistical and biological.

=== Political and administrative regionalisations ===
The most prominent regionalisation of Australia is the division into the various states and territories. For electoral purposes, the Australian Senate uses states and territories, but the Australian House of Representatives breaks the country into Divisions. Each state is similarly divided into electoral "regions", "districts" or "provinces", each of which elects members to the house or houses of the state's parliament. Finally, the country is divided into local government areas, each of which is administered by a council.

Other administrative regionalisations may exist within each state. For example, the whole of mainland Western Australia other than the Perth metropolitan area, is divided into regions for the purposes of administration of the Regional Development Commissions Act 1993.

=== Statistical regionalisations ===
For the purposes of statistical geography, the Australian Bureau of Statistics uses the Australian Standard Geographical Classification, a hierarchical regionalisation whose coarsest level is the states and territories, then statistical divisions, statistical subdivisions, statistical local areas, and finally, census collection districts.

=== Biogeographical regionalisations ===
Until recently, most biogeographical and phytogeographical regionalisations of Australia were individually defined for each state and territories; for example: Gwen Harden's botanical regionalisation of New South Wales; Orchard's "natural regions" regionalisation of Tasmania; and John Stanley Beard's division of Western Australia into Botanical Provinces and Botanical Districts.

More recently, two regionalisations that cover the entire country have been put in place. The World Wildlife Fund's regionalisation of the world into 825 terrestrial ecoregions created 40 ecoregions in Australia. Within Australia, however, the de facto standard regionalisation is now the Interim Biogeographic Regionalisation for Australia (IBRA). This divides Australia into 85 bioregions, which are further divided into 404 subregions.

=== Others ===
There are a range of other regionalisations of Australia, including:

- meteorological and climatic regionalisations, as defined and used by the Bureau of Meteorology;
- catchment areas and drainage systems;
- geological regionalisation
- cadastral divisions of Australia

== Multi-state/territorial ==
- Capital Country – ACT/NSW
- Eastern Australia – NSW/QLD/VIC/ACT, sometimes including SA and TAS
- East Coast of Australia – also known as an Eastern seaboard
- Lake Eyre basin – QLD/SA/NT/NSW
- Murray–Darling basin – NSW/ACT/VIC/QLD/SA
- Northern Australia – NT/QLD/part of WA
- The Nullarbor – SA/WA
- Outback – mainly NT and WA, but all territories except ACT and TAS
- Southern Australia – TAS/VIC/SA, sometimes including NSW and WA
- Sunraysia – a portion of NSW and VIC

== New South Wales ==
See also the Bureau of Meteorology's NSW regions map.

- Blue Mountains
- Central Coast
- Central Tablelands
- Central West
- Greater Western Sydney
- Far South Coast
- Far West
- Hunter Region (Newcastle)
- Illawarra (Wollongong)
- Lord Howe Island
- Mid North Coast
- Murray
- New England (north-west)
- North West Slopes
- Northern Rivers
- Northern Tablelands
- Orana
- Riverina
- Sapphire Coast
- Snowy Mountains
- South Coast
- Southern Highlands
- Southern Tablelands
- South West Slopes
- Sunraysia
- Sydney

== Northern Territory ==
See also the Bureau of Meteorology's NT region map

- Arnhem Land
- Barkly Tableland
- Central Australia
- Darwin Region
- Katherine Region
- Top End
- Victoria River

== Queensland ==
See also the Bureau of Meteorology's Queensland region map

- Central Queensland
  - Channel Country
  - Capricorn Coast
- Darling Downs
  - Granite Belt
  - Maranoa
- Far North Queensland
  - Torres Strait Islands
  - Gulf Country
- North Queensland
  - Whitsunday
  - Townsville
- South East Queensland
  - Brisbane
  - Gold Coast
  - Sunshine Coast
  - West Moreton
- Wide Bay–Burnett
  - South Burnett
- Central West Queensland
- South West Queensland
  - Channel Country

== South Australia ==
See also the Bureau of Meteorology's South Australia regions map

- Adelaide Plains
- Adelaide Hills/Mount Lofty Ranges
- Barossa Valley
- Eyre Peninsula
- Far North
- Fleurieu Peninsula
- Flinders Ranges
- Kangaroo Island
- Limestone Coast
- Mid North
  - Clare Valley
- Murray Mallee
  - Murraylands
  - Riverland
- Yorke Peninsula
  - Copper Triangle

== Tasmania ==
See also the Bureau of Meteorology's Tasmania regions map

- Central Highlands
- Midlands
- West Coast
- Hobart

== Victoria ==
See also the Bureau of Meteorology's Victoria regions map

Official

The six official regions of Victoria are:

- Barwon South West
  - Barwon
  - Great South Coast
- Gippsland
- Grampians
  - Central Highlands
  - Wimmera Southern Mallee
- Greater Melbourne
- Hume
  - Goulburn
  - Ovens Murray
- Loddon Mallee
  - Loddon Campaspe
  - Mallee

Unofficial

- Central Victoria
  - Yarra Valley
  - Upper Yarra
  - The Bays
    - Port Phillip
    - Mornington Peninsula
    - Bellarine Peninsula
    - Western Port
  - Goldfields
    - Spa Country
  - Central Coast
    - Bass Coast
- Northern Country/North Central
  - Central Murray
  - Lower Goulburn
  - Goulburn Valley
  - Southern Riverina
  - Upper Goulburn
- Northeast
  - Victorian Alps
  - Upper Murray
  - High Country
  - Bogong High Plains
- Gippsland
  - East Gippsland
  - West Gippsland
  - South Gippsland
  - Central Gippsland
    - Gippsland Lakes
  - Central Gippsland Coast
  - East Gippsland Coast
  - Victorian Alps
- Western District
  - Central Highlands/Tablelands
  - Pyrenees
  - The Grampians
  - Goldfields
    - Spa Country
- Southwest
  - The Otways
  - West Coast
    - Shipwreck Coast
    - Great Ocean Road
    - Surf Coast
- Northwest
  - The Mallee
    - Sunraysia
    - Millewa
  - The Wimmera

== Western Australia ==
See also the Bureau of Meteorology's Western Australia regions map.

The Western Australian system of regions defined by the Government of Western Australia for purposes of economic development administration, which excludes the Perth metropolitan area, is a series of nine regions.

The nine defined regions are:

- Gascoyne
- Goldfields–Esperance
- Great Southern
- Kimberley
- Mid West
- Peel
- Pilbara
- South West
- Wheatbelt

== See also ==
- Australian regional rivalries
- Interim Biogeographic Regionalisation for Australia
- Local government in Australia
