= Grampians Peaks Trail =

Hiking trail in Victoria, Australia

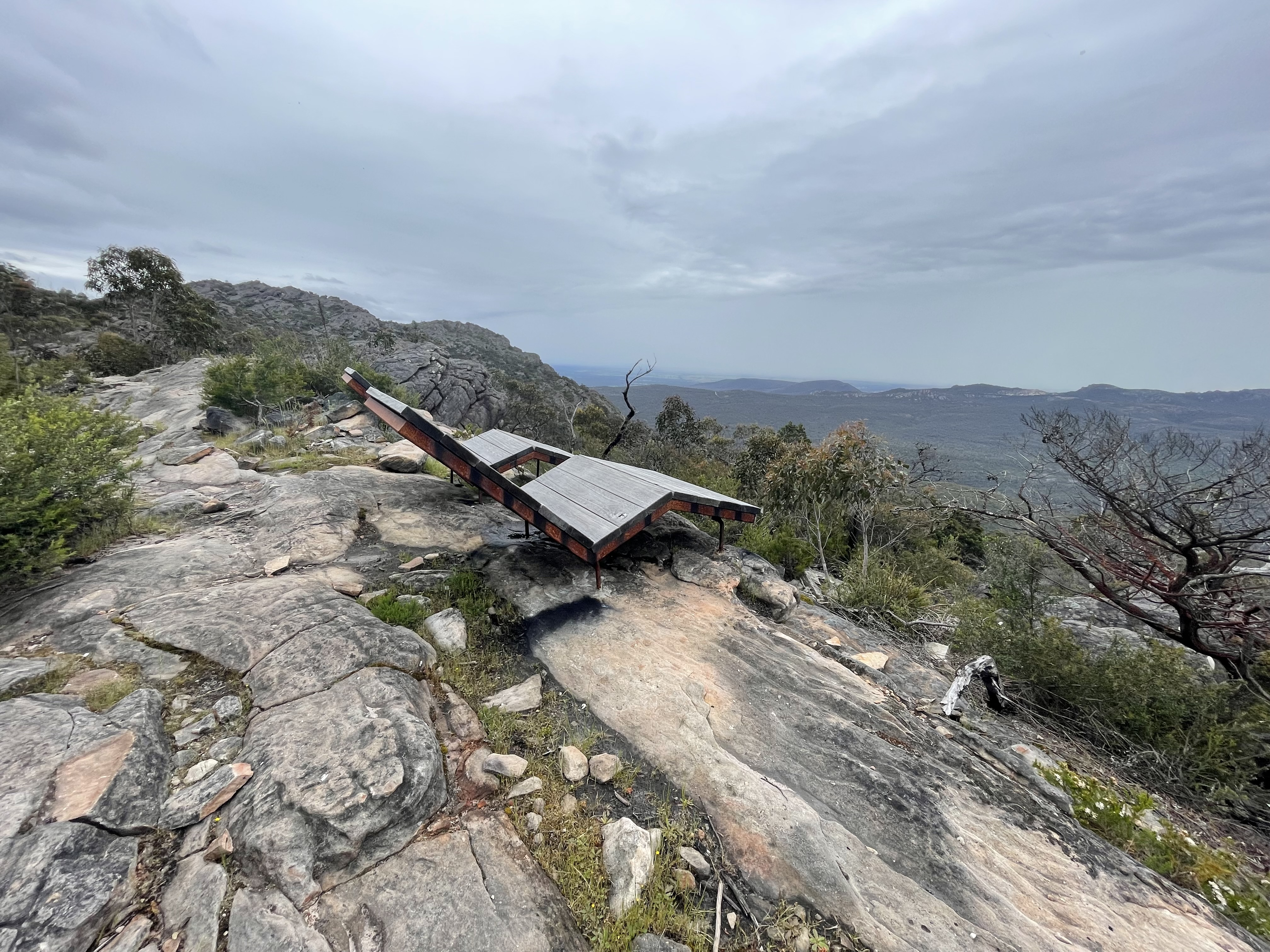
- View from Gar Hike-in Campground (Night 2) of the trail
- Length: 164 km (102 mi)
- Location: Grampians National Park, Victoria, Australia
- Began construction: 2015
- Completed: 12 November 2021
- Trailheads: Mount Zero Picnic Ground
- Use: Hiking
- Grade: 4-5
- Surface: Mixed - Rocky, dirt trail, gravel, etc.
- Website: parks.vic.gov.au

The Grampians Peaks Trail is a 164 km (102 mi) long walking track in the Grampians National Park, Victoria, Australia. The trail traverses the park from north to south and is split into 3 main sections known as the Northern Section (4 days, 3 nights), Central Section (5 days, 4 nights) and Southern Section (4 days, 3 nights). The area traverses a wide range of different terrains including rugged rocky mountains, valleys, ridge-lines alongside abundant flora and fauna.

The trail features 11 unique campgrounds with the fourth night on the trail spent in the town of Halls Gap at the walkers expense. All campsites must be booked in advance and come with a range of facilities including water tanks, huts, camping platforms, toilets and communal areas.

In 2014 a master plan was developed by Parks Victoria to map out the entirety of the new trail including identifying possible partnerships between public and private sectors to help make the project possible. The plan identified the route the new trail would take through the park including the placement of campsites which hikers would stay at during their trip. The trail, which had been constructed over several years was finished and opened in its entirety in November 2021.

The trail is now home to several tourism operations including guided walks companies which offer a mix of luxury tours and standard walks for their customers. This has boosted the local tourism industry drastically since the trails opening in late 2021, with several hundred walkers all walking the trail at the same time.

== List of campgrounds ==
Along the trail there are 11 set campgrounds for the recommended 12 nights journey.

- Barigar (Night 1) – Northern Section
- Gar (Night 2) – Northern Section
- Werdug (Night 3) – Northern Section
- Halls Gap (Night 4) – Northern Section (Not a campsite) – stay in Halls Gap Township
- Bugiga (Night 5) – Central Section
- Barri Yalug (Night 6) – Central Section
- Duwul (Night 7) – Central Section
- Durd Durd (Night 8) – Central Section
- Yarram (Night 9) – Central Section
- Wannon (Night 10) – Southern Section
- Djardji-djawara (Night 11) – Southern Section
- Mud-dadjug (Night 12) – Southern Section
