= Regions of Victoria =

Different divisions of Victoria, Australia

The regions of Victoria vary according to the different ways that the Australian state of Victoria is divided into distinct geographic regions. The most commonly used regions are those created by the state government for the purposes of economic development.

Others regions include those made for land management, such as agriculture or conservation, and for the gathering of information, such as statistical or meteorological. Although most regional systems were defined for specific purposes and given specific boundaries, many regions have similar names and extents according to the different regionalisations. As a result, the names and boundaries of regions can vary and overlap even in popular usage.

== Economic regions ==
In addition to Greater Melbourne, the Victoria State Government has divided Victoria into five regions covering all parts of the state. The five regions are:

1. Barwon South West region
2. Gippsland region
3. Grampians region
4. Hume region
5. Loddon Mallee region

=== Barwon South West region ===
The Barwon South West region stretches from the tip of the Queenscliff Heads to the border of South Australia. It is home to Victoria’s largest provincial centre, Geelong. The region includes the local government areas of Colac Otway, Corangamite, Glenelg, Greater Geelong, Moyne, Queenscliffe, Southern Grampians, Surf Coast and Warrnambool City.

=== Gippsland region ===
The Gippsland region stretches from the eastern outskirts of Melbourne to the southeastern tip of Victoria and north to the Black-Allan Line denoting the border with New South Wales. Its western boundary is defined by the Great Dividing Range and the Tasman Sea forms its eastern boundary. The region includes the local government areas of Bass Coast, Baw Baw, East Gippsland, Latrobe City, South Gippsland and Wellington.

=== Grampians region ===
The Grampians region stretches from the western edge of Melbourne to the South Australian border and includes the Grampians National Park and significant gold mining heritage assets. The region includes the local government areas of Ararat City, Ballarat City, Golden Plains, Hepburn, Hindmarsh, Horsham City, Moorabool, Northern Grampians, Pyrenees, West Wimmera and Yarriambiack. The Grampians region has two sub-regions, Grampians Central Highlands and Wimmera Southern Mallee.

=== Hume region ===
The Hume region stretches south from the Murray River with its eastern boundary defined by the Great Dividing Range and the Victorian Alps, its southern boundary defined by Greater Melbourne and its western boundary characterised by the Goulburn and Broken river catchments and food bowl. The region includes the local government areas of Alpine, Benalla City, Indigo, Mansfield, Mitchell, Moira, Murrindindi, Greater Shepparton, Strathbogie, Towong, Wangaratta City, and Wodonga City.

=== Loddon Mallee region ===
The Loddon Mallee region occupies more than a quarter of Victoria and stretches from Greater Melbourne to the northwest corner of the state that marks the boundaries with South Australia and New South Wales. The region includes the local government areas of Greater Bendigo City, Buloke, Campaspe, Central Goldfields, Gannawarra, Loddon, Macedon Ranges, Mildura City, Mount Alexander, and Swan Hill City.

== Other regional terms used in Victoria ==
=== Local government regions / statistical areas level 4 ===
The approximately 80 local government areas of Victoria are grouped into 17 regions also known by the ABS as "statistical areas level 4". The non-Melbourne areas are: North West, Warrnambool and South West, Bendigo, Ballarat, Geelong, Shepparton, Hume, Latrobe - Gippsland, Mornington Peninsula. Melbourne is divided into: Melbourne - Inner, Melbourne - Inner East, Melbourne - Inner South, Melbourne - North East, Melbourne - North West, Melbourne - Outer East, Melbourne - South East, Melbourne - West.

=== Electoral regions ===
There are 8 electoral regions, which are used to form the Victorian Legislative Council. They are:

- Eastern Victoria Region
- North-Eastern Metropolitan Region
- Northern Metropolitan Region
- Northern Victoria Region
- South-Eastern Metropolitan Region
- Southern Metropolitan Region
- Western Metropolitan Region
- Western Victoria Region

=== Meteorological regions ===
The Australian Bureau of Meteorology defines regions for its own purposes, some of which share names with the economic regions, even though the exact boundaries may not correlate. As of November 2014, they are: Mallee, Wimmera, Northern Country, North East, East Gippsland, West & South Gippsland, Central, North Central, South West, Alpine and Melbourne.

=== Wine producing regions ===
Viticulture has a long history since colonisation of Victoria. Wine production is concentrated around the Central Highlands and its associated tablelands and includes the Grampians wine region, the Pyrenees, the Yarra Valley, and the Ovens and Murray region. In the state's north-west, the Murray Darling and Swan Hill regions also produce wine.

=== Bioregions ===
The Interim Biogeographic Regionalisation for Australia places parts of Victoria in the following bioregions, some of which are wholly contained with the state, and others that cover two or more states and territories.

- Australian Alps bioregion – most notably the Victorian Alps sub-bioregion
- Furneaux bioregion – most notably the Wilsons Promontory sub-bioregion
- Murray Darling Depression bioregion – including parts of the Murray Mallee, Lowan Mallee, and Wimmera sub-bioregions
- Naracoorte Coastal Plain bioregion – including parts of the Glenelg Plain sub-bioregion
- NSW South Western Slopes bioregion – including parts of the Lower Slopes sub-bioregion
- Riverina bioregion – most notably the Victorian Riverina and parts of the Robinvale Plains sub-bioregions
- South East Coastal Plain bioregion
- South East Corner bioregion – including parts of the East Gippsland Lowlands and Bateman sub-bioregions
- South Eastern Highlands bioregion – most notably the Otway Ranges, Strzelecki Ranges, and parts of the Highlands-Southern Fall sub-bioregions
- Southern Volcanic Plain bioregion – most notably the Victorian Volcanic Plain sub-bioregion
- Victorian Midlands bioregion

=== Fire districts ===
The Country Fire Authority (CFA) divides Victoria into nine fire districts. From west to east, and north to south: Mallee, Wimmera, South West, Northern Country, North Central, Central, North East, East Gippsland, West & South Gippsland.

=== Other regional terms ===
A number of other regional terms are used to define certain areas, although their exact boundaries are unclear. For example:

- The area that embraces Greater Melbourne is sometimes referred to as Central Victoria and may include the Yarra Valley, the Upper Yarra, The Bays that include Port Phillip, the Mornington Peninsula, the Bellarine, and the Western Port, the Goldfields, the Spa Country, the Central Coast, and the Bass Coast.
- In the Northern Country/North Central region, the terms Central Murray, Lower Goulburn, Goulburn Valley, Upper Goulburn and Southern Riverina are sometimes used.
- In the Northeast region, the terms Victorian Alps, Upper Murray, Victorian High Country, Alpine region, Victorian Snowfields, Australian Alps, and Bogong High Plains are sometimes used.
- Within the Gippsland region, the terms East Gippsland, West Gippsland, South Gippsland, Central Gippsland, Gippsland Lakes, Central Gippsland Coast, East Gippsland Coast, and the Victorian Alps (overlapped with the Northeast region) are sometimes used.
- In the Western District of Victoria, the terms Central Highlands/Tablelands, the Pyrenees, The Grampians, and the Goldfields and the Spa Country (both overlapped with Central Victoria) are sometimes used.
- In the Southwest region, the terms The Otways, West Coast, Shipwreck Coast, Great Ocean Road, and the Surf Coast are sometimes used.
- In the Northwest region, the terms The Mallee, Millewa, Sunraysia, and The Wimmera are sometimes used.

== See also ==
- Cadastral divisions of Victoria
- Interim Biogeographic Regionalisation for Australia
