= Acacia mitchellii =

Scientific classification
- Kingdom: Plantae
- Clade: Tracheophytes
- Clade: Angiosperms
- Clade: Eudicots
- Clade: Rosids
- Order: Fabales
- Family: Fabaceae
- Subfamily: Caesalpinioideae
- Clade: Mimosoid clade
- Genus: Acacia
- Species: A. mitchellii

Binomial name
- Acacia mitchellii Benth.
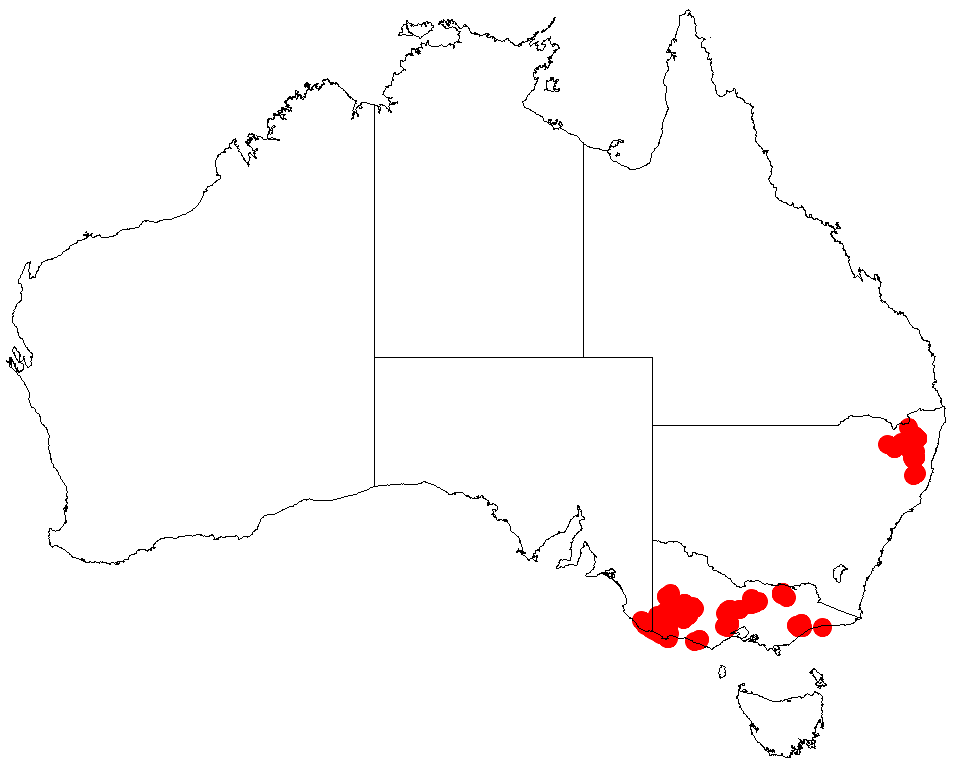
- Occurrence data from AVH

Synonyms
- Acacia mitchelli Benth. orth. var.; Racosperma mitchellii (Benth.) Pedley

Species of plant

Acacia mitchellii, commonly known as Mitchell's wattle, is a species of flowering plant in the family Fabaceae, and is endemic to the south-east of mainland Australia. It is an erect to spreading shrub with more or less sessile, bipinnate leaves, spherical heads of pale yellow to more or less white flowers, and firmly papery, straight to strongly curved pods, sometimes slightly constricted between a few seeds.

== Description ==
Acacia mitchellii is an erect to spreading shrub that typically grows to a height of up to 2 m (6 ft 7 in) with smooth bark and more or less terete, ridged branchlets covered with soft hairs. The leaves are more or less sessile with usually up to five pairs of pinnae 2–12 mm (0.079–0.472 in) long, the lowest pair immediately above or near the pulvinus on a rachis 10–15 mm (0.39–0.59 in) long. Each pinna has two to seven pairs of narrowly oblong to oblong or sometimes elliptic, pinnules 2–5 mm (0.079–0.197 in) long, 1.0–1.7 mm (0.039–0.067 in) wide and glabrous with a single vein. The flowers are borne in up to three spherical heads on sparsely hairy of glabrous peduncles 7–20 mm (0.28–0.79 in) long. Each head has 30 to 45 pale yellow to more or less white flowers. Flowering is irregular, mainly occurring between November and March, and the pods are straight to strongly curved, 15–80 mm (0.59–3.15 in) long, 4–8 mm (0.16–0.31 in) wide, firmly papery, brown to greyish brown or black, and glabrous, sometimes slightly constricted between a few seeds.

== Taxonomy ==
Acacia mitchellii was first formally described in 1842 by George Bentham in the Hooker's London Journal of Botany, based on a collection made during Thomas Mitchell's expedition through the interior of New South Wales. The specific epithet (mitchellii) honours Sir Thomas Mitchell, who collected the type specimen of this species in the "interior of New South Wales", which was possibly in Victoria.

== Distribution and habitat ==
Mitchell's wattle is restricted to a few areas on the Northern Tablelands of New South Wales, but is common in central and western Victoria, especially the Grampians, and only near Mount Gambier in South Australia. It grows in forest, woodland and open scrub or swampy areas.
