= Grampians wine region =

Wine-producing region in Victoria, Australia

Coordinates: 37°14′35.6″S 142°16′31″E

Grampians
- Wine region
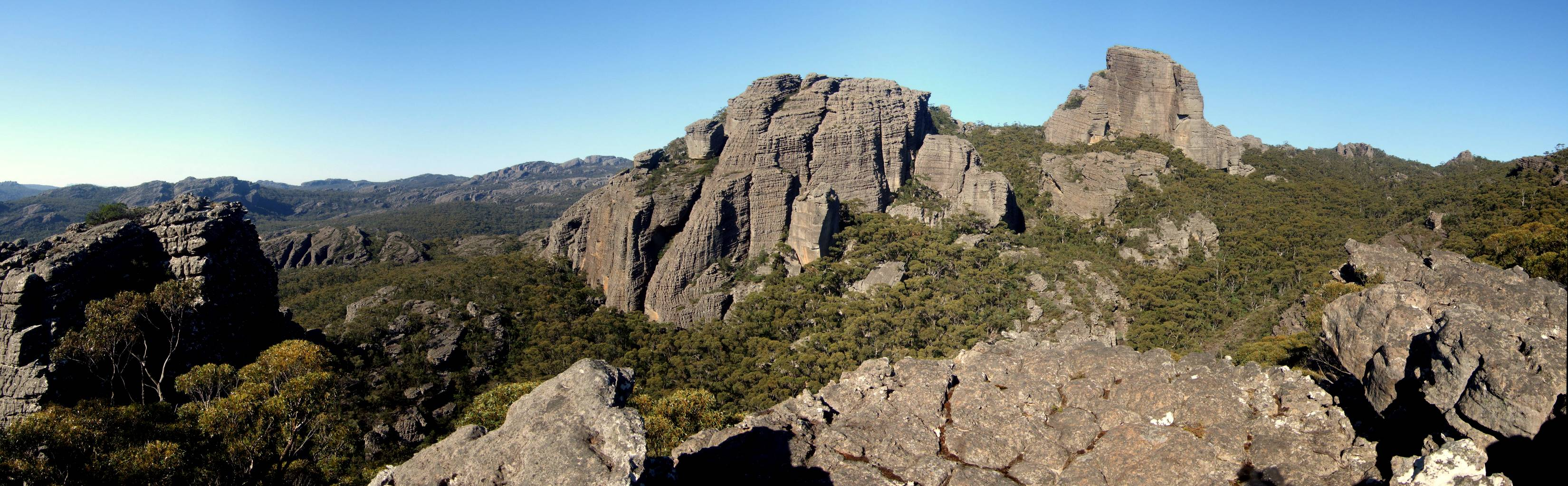
- Type: Wine region
- Country: Australia
- Climate region: Maritime
- Grapes produced: Shiraz, Cabernet Sauvignon

The Grampians is an Australian wine region located in the state of Victoria, west of Melbourne. It is located near the Grampians National Park and the Pyrenees hills. The area is dominated by red wine production, particularly Shiraz and Cabernet Sauvignon.

== Geography and climate ==
Despite being located close to the Grampians National Park, the region itself sits between 240 and 440 metres above sea level. It is a cooler region by Australian standards, the average temperature during January being just 20.2 °C (68.4 °F). The harvest period is typically mid March to mid May.

=== Great Western ===
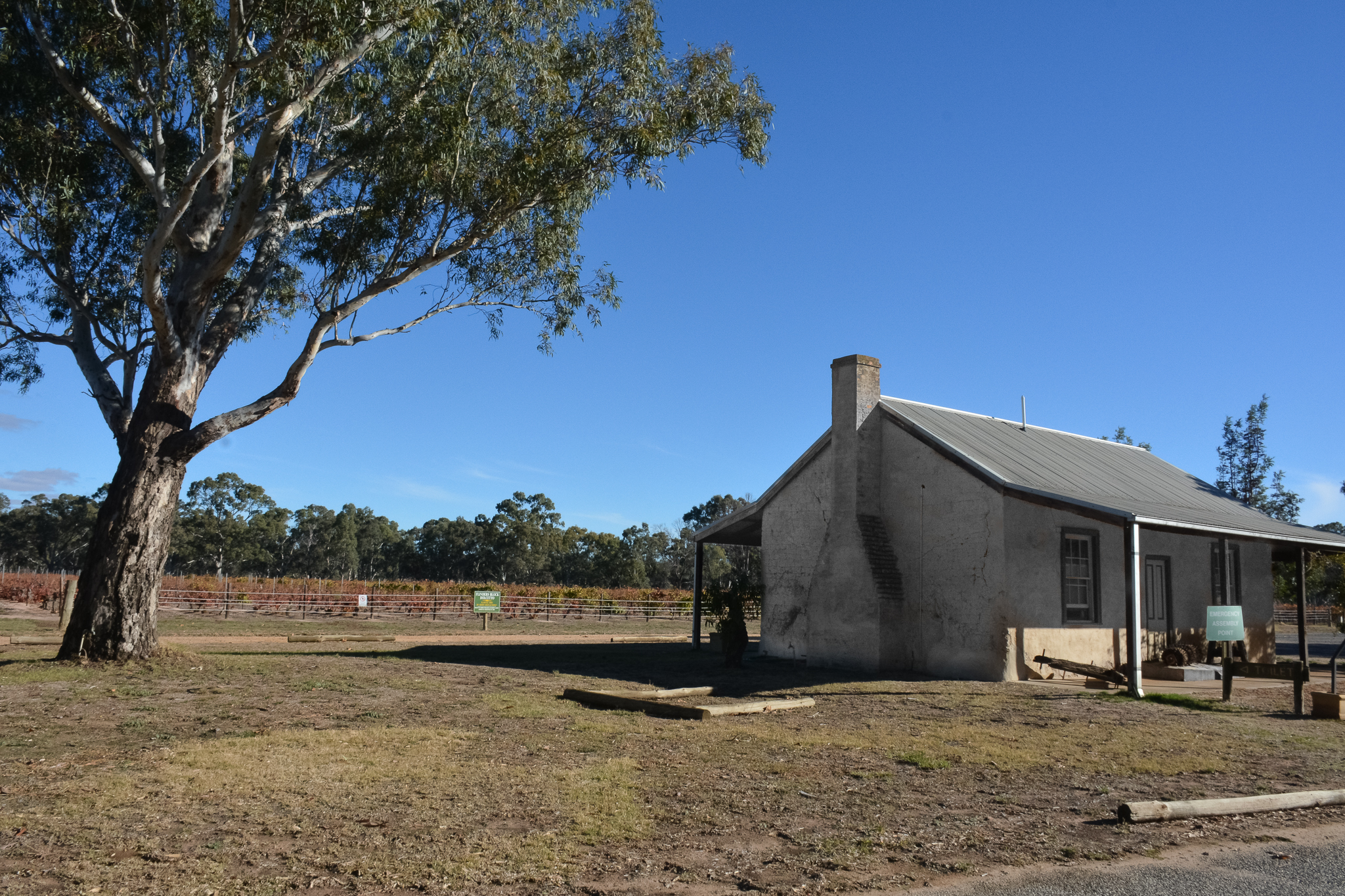
Bests Winery, Great Western, Victoria

Great Western is the first subregion of the Grampians to achieve GI status, doing so in 2007. It is the historical heart of the Grampians and the location of most of its wineries. The topsoil is predominantly sandy loam with quartz and gravel pockets, the subsoil deep clay. Great Western is the wine and food village of the Grampians, with five cellar doors open to the public. Further information on Great Western

== History ==
The area was first vinified in 1862 with plantings of Concongella Creek and Great Western. French winemaker Charles Pierlot first introduced the methode champenoise at Great Western Estate (now owned by Seppelt), and the region developed a reputation for its sparkling wine.

== Food and Wine Festival ==
Grampians wineries feature at one of Australia's longest running food and wine festivals, Grampians Grape Escape, held in the Grampians National Park at Halls Gap over the first weekend of May every year. Launched in 1992, Grampians Grape Escape is a hallmark event for Victoria and provides food and wine offerings by more than 100 local artisan producers, live music and family entertainment. Each year participating wineries select a parcel of wine from the year's vintage for inclusion in the special release Grampians Reserve Shiraz, which is auctioned exclusively at the Festival. Up to a tonne of grapes are donated to the Festival each year by local vineyards and picked by school students for a traditional grape stomping competition.

== See also ==
- Victorian wine
