= Halls Gap Zoo =

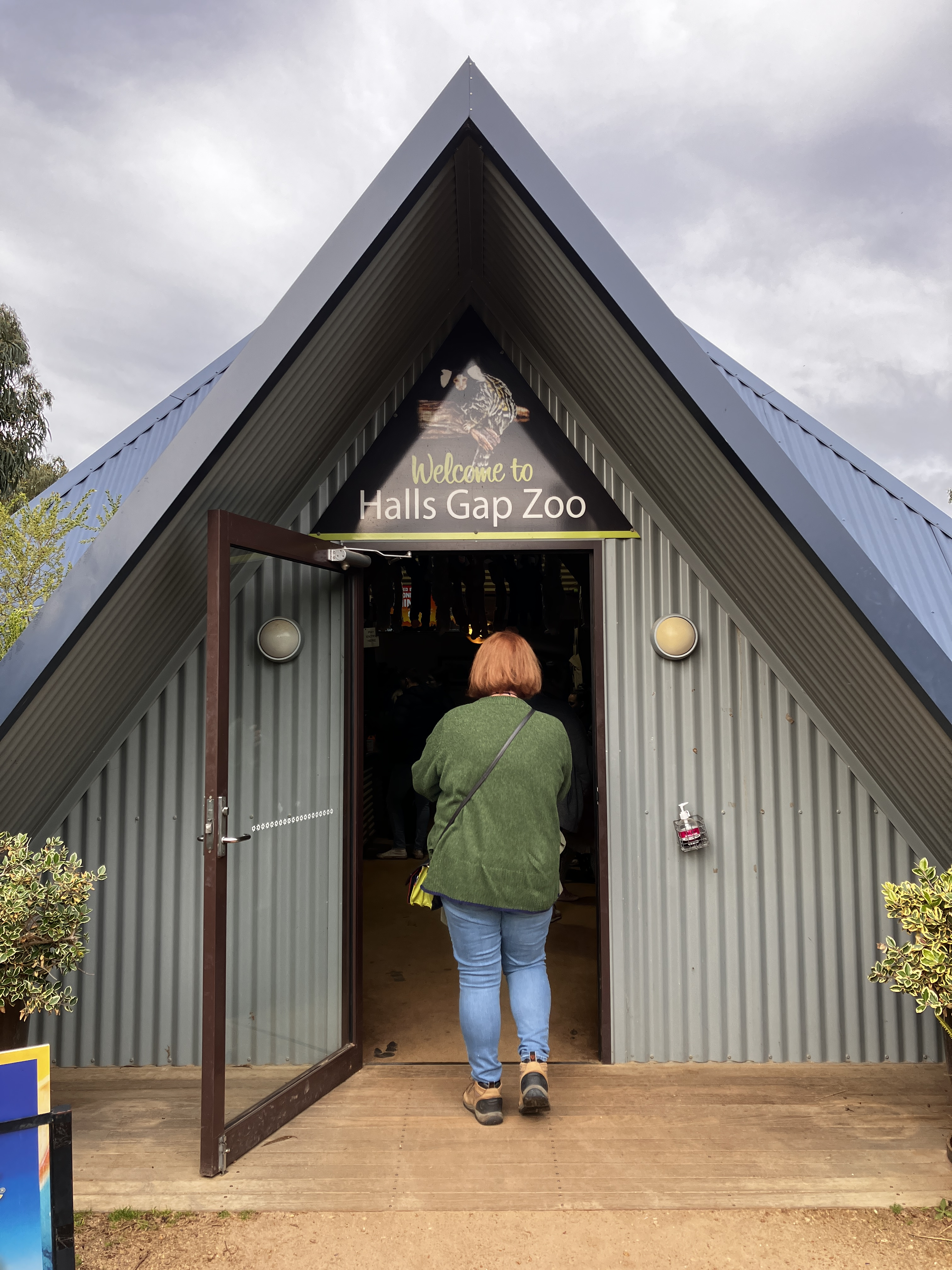
- Halls Gap Zoo entrance, 2023
- Interactive map of Halls Gap Zoo
- 37°8′52″S 142°33′49″E
- Location: Halls Gap, Victoria, Australia
- Land area: 21 ha (52 acres)
- No. of species: 125+
- Website: www.hallsgapzoo.com.au

Halls Gap Zoo is a country 53-acre (21 ha) zoo located about 7 kilometres (4.3 mi) from Halls Gap, Victoria, Australia. It is Victoria's largest regional zoo, holding over 120 native and exotic species.

== History ==
Halls Gap Zoo was originally opened in the early 1980s as Wallaroo Wildlife Park. New owners in 1998 opened the facility as the Halls Gap Wildlife Park & Zoo. The owners since July 2023 are Mark and Lisa Treweek, and their two sons Cooper and William.

== Animals ==
The Zoo has a mixture of about 120 native and exotic species. The native animals include kangaroos, emus, wombats, dingoes and wallabies. Exotic animals include bison, monkeys, deer, giraffes, ostriches and cheetahs. There are also a variety of reptiles (including saltwater crocodiles) and birds at the zoo.

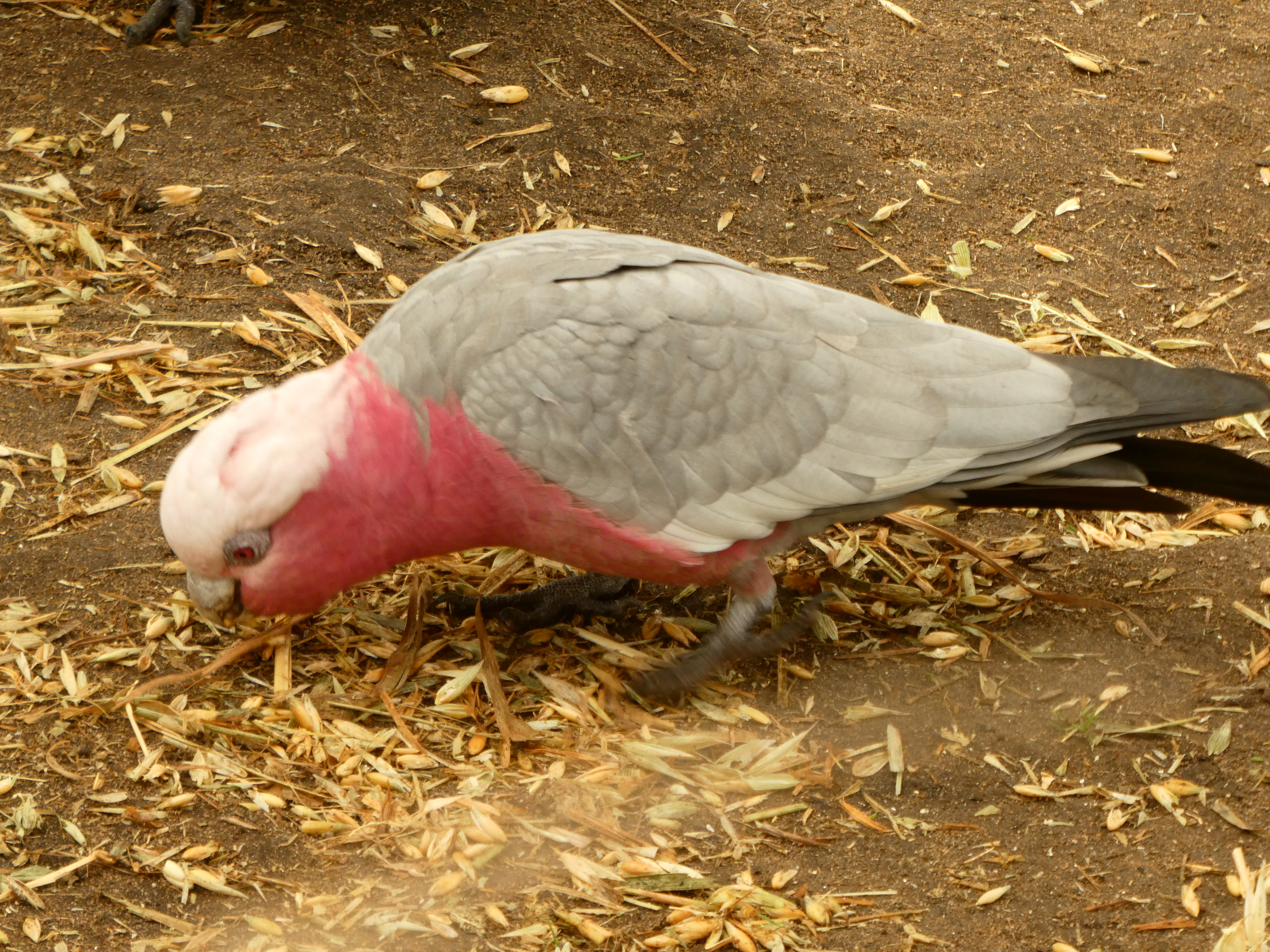
Galah at the Halls Gap Zoo.

Birds

- African firefinch
- Australian barn owl
- Australian wood duck
- Black swan
- Black-headed caique
- Black-winged stilt
- Blue-and-gold macaw
- Blue peafowl
- Brolga
- Bush stone-curlew
- Canada goose
- Chattering lory
- Chinese goose
- Common ostrich
- Diamond firetail
- Dusky lory
- Eclectus parrot
- Egyptian goose
- Emu
- Galah
- Green-winged macaw
- Golden pheasant
- Helmeted guineafowl
- Major Mitchell's cockatoo
- Mandarin duck
- Orange-bellied parrot
- Peaceful dove
- Rainbow lorikeet
- Red bishop weaver
- Red junglefowl
- Red-tailed black cockatoo
- Rose-crowned fruit dove
- Scarlet macaw
- Southern boobook
- St Helena waxbill
- Sulphur-crested cockatoo
- Sun conure
- Turquoise-fronted amazon
- Wedge-tailed eagle
- White-browed woodswallow
- Yellow-tailed black cockatoo
- Zebra finch

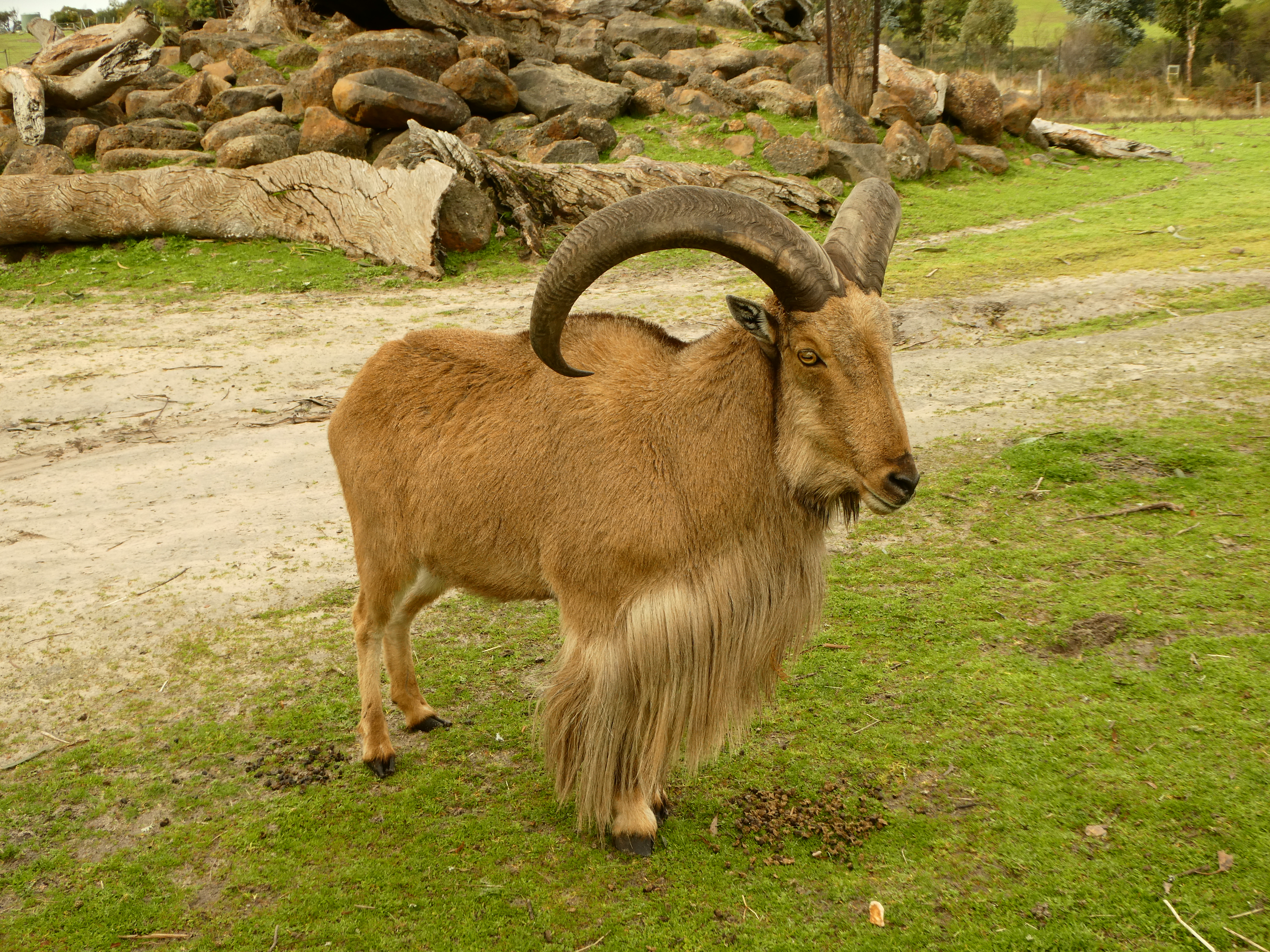
Barbary Sheep at the Halls Gap Zoo

Mammals

- American bison
- Asian small-clawed otter
- Bare-nosed wombat
- Barbary sheep
- Black-and-white ruffed lemur
- Black-capped capuchin monkey
- Black-handed spider monkey
- Brush-tailed bettong
- Brush-tailed rock wallaby
- Cheetah
- Common marmoset
- Cotton-top tamarin
- Dingo
- Emperor tamarin
- Fallow deer
- Giraffe
- Golden lion tamarin
- Himalayan tahr
- Hog deer
- Kangaroo Island kangaroo
- Meerkat
- Pygmy marmoset
- Quokka
- Red panda
- Red-necked wallaby
- Red-rumped agouti
- Ring-tailed lemur
- Rusa deer
- Serval
- Southern hairy-nosed wombat
- Southern white rhinoceros
- Spotted-tailed quoll
- Swamp wallaby
- Tammar wallaby
- Tasmanian devil
- Wapiti deer
- Yellow-footed rock wallaby

The zoo also keeps several domestic mammals: donkeys, goats, guinea pigs, pig, ponies, Scottish highland cattle and Texas longhorn cattle.

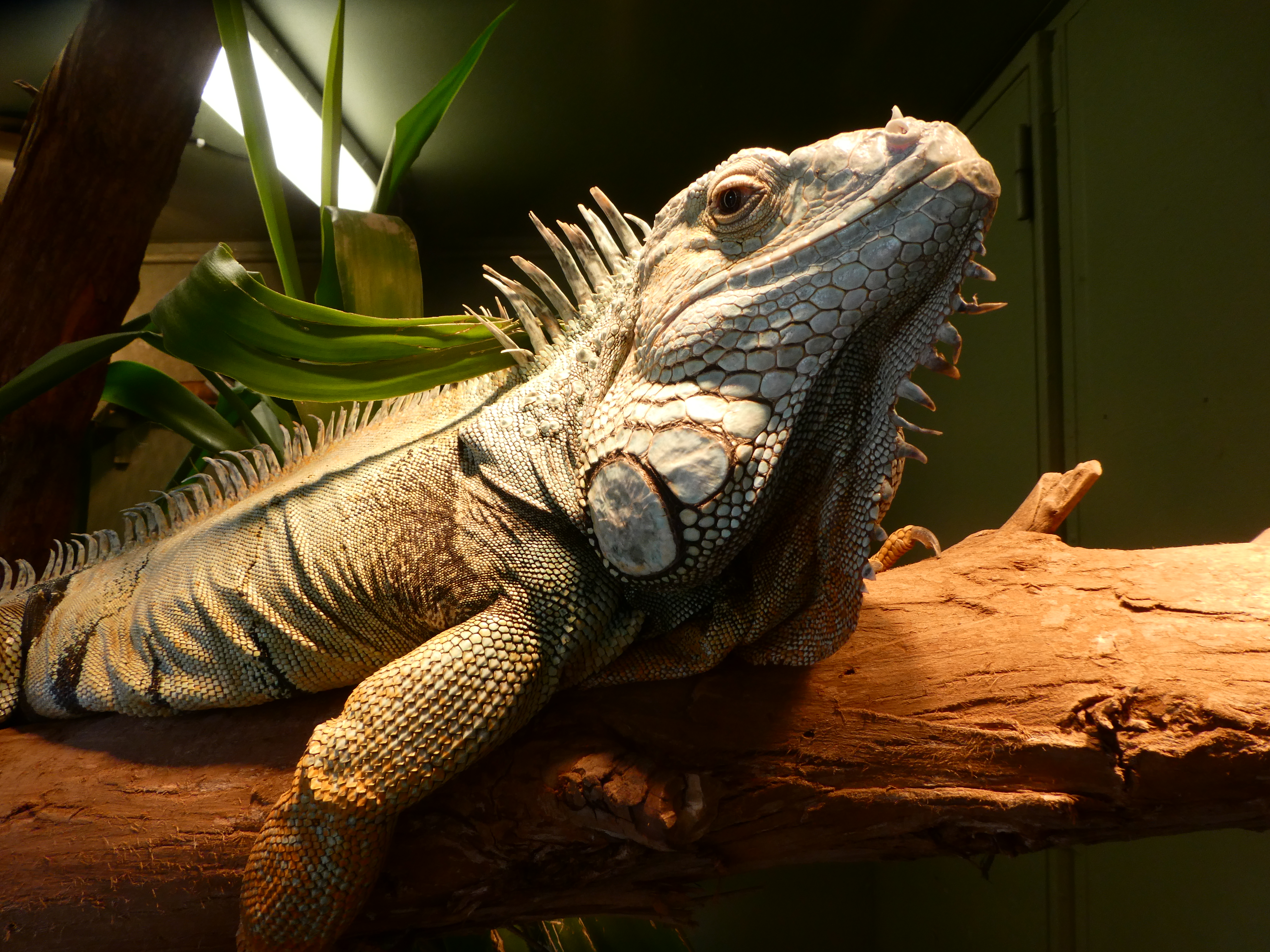
Iguana at the Halls Gap Zoo.

Reptiles

- American alligator
- Blotched blue-tongued lizard
- Boyd's forest dragon
- Burmese python
- Central bearded dragon
- Cunningham's spiny-tailed skink
- Eastern blue-tongued lizard
- Eastern water dragon
- Gidgee spiny-tailed skink
- Gila monster
- Green iguana
- Indian star tortoise
- Lace monitor
- Merten's water monitor
- Perentie
- Pig-nosed turtle
- Red-tailed boa constrictor
- Rosenberg's monitor
- Saltwater crocodile
