= Goulburn (region) =

Goulburn Region
- Region
- Country: Australia
- State: Victoria
- Region: Hume
- LGA: City of Greater Shepparton; Shire of Mitchell; Shire of Moira; Shire of Murrindindi; Shire of Strathbogie

Government
  - State electorate: * Eildon; Euroa; Kalkallo; Murray Plains; Ovens Valley; Shepparton; Yan Yean
  - Federal divisions: Indi; Nicholls

The Goulburn subregion is part of the Hume region in north eastern Victoria, Australia. It includes the municipalities of City of Greater Shepparton, Shire of Mitchell, Shire of Moira, Shire of Murrindindi, Shire of Strathbogie.

It is often referred to as the "food bowl of Australia", due to its dairy farms, highly productive, irrigated agricultural lands and viticulture.
