= Grampians Grape Escape =

Grampians Grape Escape is one of the longest running food and wine festivals in Australia and a hallmark event for Victoria. It was launched in 1992.

Held in the Grampians National Park at Halls Gap during the first weekend of May every year, the Grampians Grape Escape provides food and wine offerings by more than 100 local artisan producers, live music and family entertainment.

== Grampians Wine ==
The festival features Grampians (wine) produced by some of the oldest vines in the world; the area was first vinified in 1862 with plantings at Concongella Creek and Great Western by French winemaker Charles Pierlot. Each year participating wineries select a parcel of wine from the year's vintage for inclusion in the special release Grampians Reserve Shiraz, which is auctioned exclusively at the Festival.

== Grape stomping ==
Up to a tonne of grapes are donated to the Festival each year by local vineyards, and picked by school students for a traditional grape stomping competition.

== History ==
The Festival began in 1992 as the Halls Gap Gourmet Weekend and was rebranded as Grampians Grape Escape in 2002. It celebrated its 21st year over 5–6 May 2012 and has grown to attract a crowd of up to 10,000 foodies from across the world. Previous Festival identities have included: Manu Feildel, Poh Ling Yeow, Tobie Puttock, Ed Halmagyi, Rachel Berger, Rebecca Barnard, Monique Brumby, Adrian Richardson and Stefano de Pieri.

No festival was held in 2020–21, and upon resumption in 2022, it celebrates its 29th year.

== Recognition ==
The Festival is recommended by Australian Traveller as one of Australia's top 30 wine and beer festivals.
