= Ovens Murray =

Ovens Murray Region
- Region
- Country: Australia
- State: Victoria
- Region: Hume
- LGA: Alpine Shire; City of Wodonga; Rural City of Benalla; Rural City of Wangaratta; Shire of Indigo; Shire of Mansfield; Shire of Towong

Government
  - State electorates: Benambra; Eildon; Euroa; Ovens Valley
  - Federal division: Indi

The Ovens Murray subregion is part of the Hume region in north eastern Victoria. It includes the municipalities of Alpine Shire, City of Wodonga, Rural City of Benalla, Rural City of Wangaratta, Shire of Indigo, Shire of Mansfield, Shire of Towong.

Ovens-Murray is commonly used to refer to sporting bodies and recreational activities associated with the area, such as Australian rules football and swimming.

== See also ==
- Ovens and Murray Advertiser
- Ovens & Murray Football League
