= Central Highlands (Victoria) =

Region in Australia

Coordinates: 37°04′42.3″S 144°12′43.8″E

Central Highlands Region
- Region
- Country: Australia
- State: Victoria
- Region: Grampians
- LGA: Rural City of Ararat; City of Ballarat; Golden Plains Shire; Shire of Hepburn; Shire of Macedon Ranges; Shire of Moorabool; Shire of Pyrenees

Government
  - State electorate: * Eureka; Lowan; Macedon; Melton; Ripon; Wendouree
  - Federal division: * Ballarat; Bendigo; Corangamite; Hawke; Mallee; McEwen; Wannon

The Central Highlands subregion is part of the Grampians region in western Victoria. The term "Central Highlands" has multiple uses. In a geological context, it refers to the part of the Great Dividing Range west of the Victorian Alps but not extending to the range's western end in western Victoria. In regional planning, the term defines an area that includes the municipalities of Rural City of Ararat, City of Ballarat, Golden Plains Shire, Shire of Hepburn, Shire of Moorabool, and Shire of Pyrenees.

The area is centred on the city of Ballarat, and includes the towns of Daylesford, Creswick, Beaufort, Bacchus Marsh, Bannockburn, Avoca and Ararat.

== Economy ==
The Central Highlands economy is based on manufacturing, services, and agriculture. Ballarat is the region's main employment and service centre. The region's agricultural output includes lamb, wool, wheat, poultry, and horticultural products, accounting for approximately one-third of Victoria's chicken meat. In 2019, tourism contributed more than $1 billion to the regional economy. Renewable energy production, particularly wind power, has been identified as an emerging industry, subject to transmission network capacity.
