= Halls Gap =

Halls Gap Budja Budja
- Town
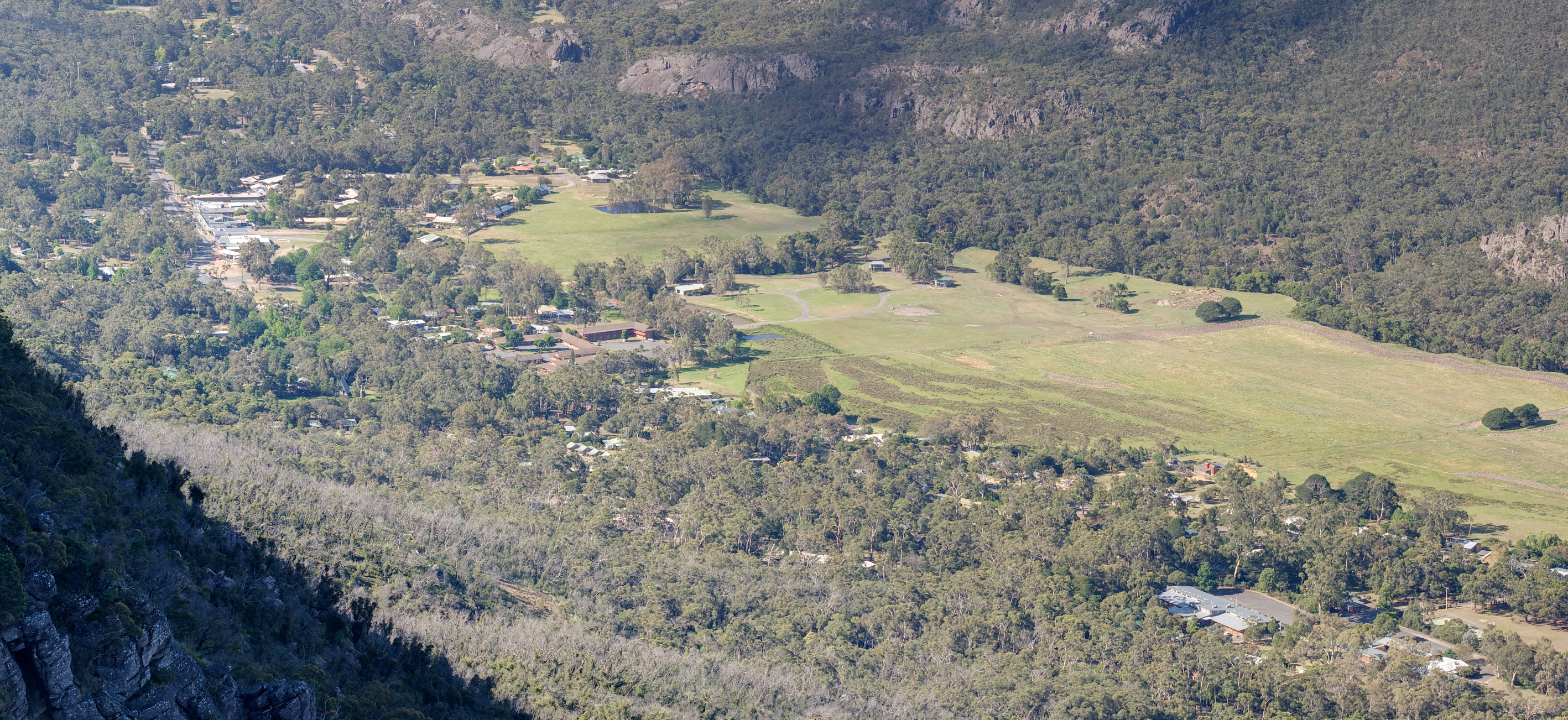

- Coordinates: 37°07′0″S 142°33′0″E
- Country: Australia
- State: Victoria
- LGAs: Shire of Northern Grampians; Rural City of Ararat
- Location: 253 km (157 mi) NW of Melbourne CBD; 141 km (88 mi) NW of Ballarat; 48 km (30 mi) NW of Ararat; 489 km (304 mi) SE of Adelaide

Government
  - State electorate: Lowan
  - Federal division: Mallee

Area
  - Total: 76.1 km^{2} (29.4 sq mi)

Population
  - Total: 495 (2021 census)
  - Density: 6.505/km^{2} (16.847/sq mi)
- Time zone: UTC+10 (AEST)
  - Summer (DST): UTC+11 (AEDT)
- Postcode: 3381
- County: Borung

Halls Gap (Djab Wurrung/Jardwadjali: Budja Budja) is a town in Victoria, Australia. It is located on Grampians Road, adjacent to the Grampians National Park, in the Shire of Northern Grampians local government area. The town is set in the Fyans Valley at the foot of the Wonderland and Mount William ranges. At the 2021 census Halls Gap had a population of 495. The approximate driving time from Melbourne is 3 hours.

== History ==
The first European settler was Charles Browning Hall who set out in search of a suitable grazing run when he found the cattle market at Port Phillip overstocked in 1841. Establishing a station just east of the Grampians in a spot known as "Mokepilli" to the indigenous inhabitants the Mukjarawaint. Halls Gap was originally located where Lake Bellfield Reservoir now lies.

Hall discovered the gap by following Aboriginal tracks.

Hall's Gap Post Office opened on 3 February 1893, closed in 1896, and reopened in 1902.

== First Nations ==
The Traditional Owners of the area are the Djab Wurrung and the Jardwadjali, who referred to the area as "Mokepilli".

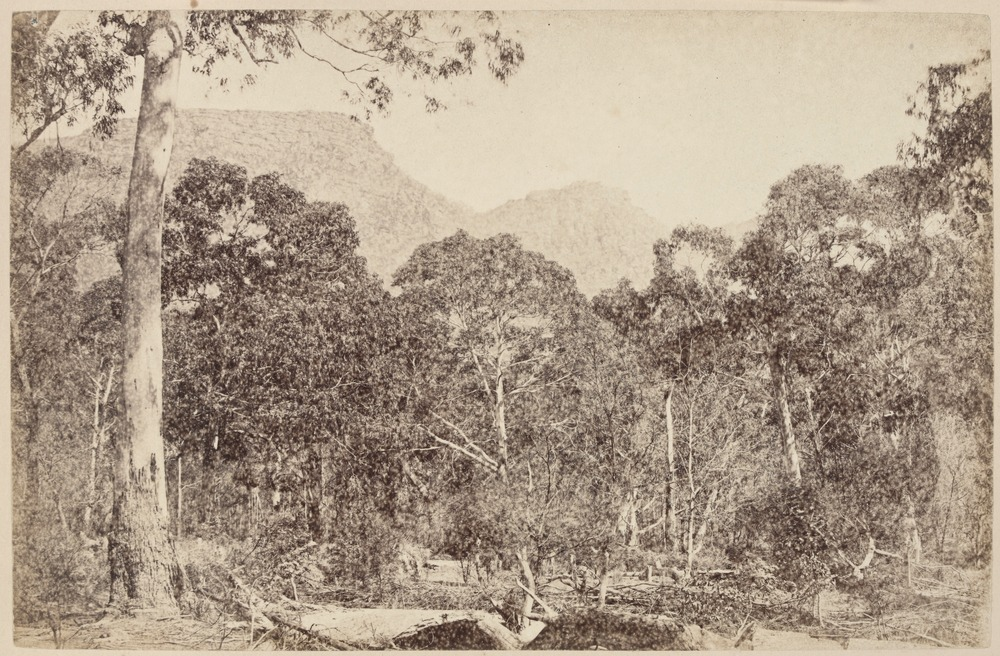
Hall's Gap, The Grampians

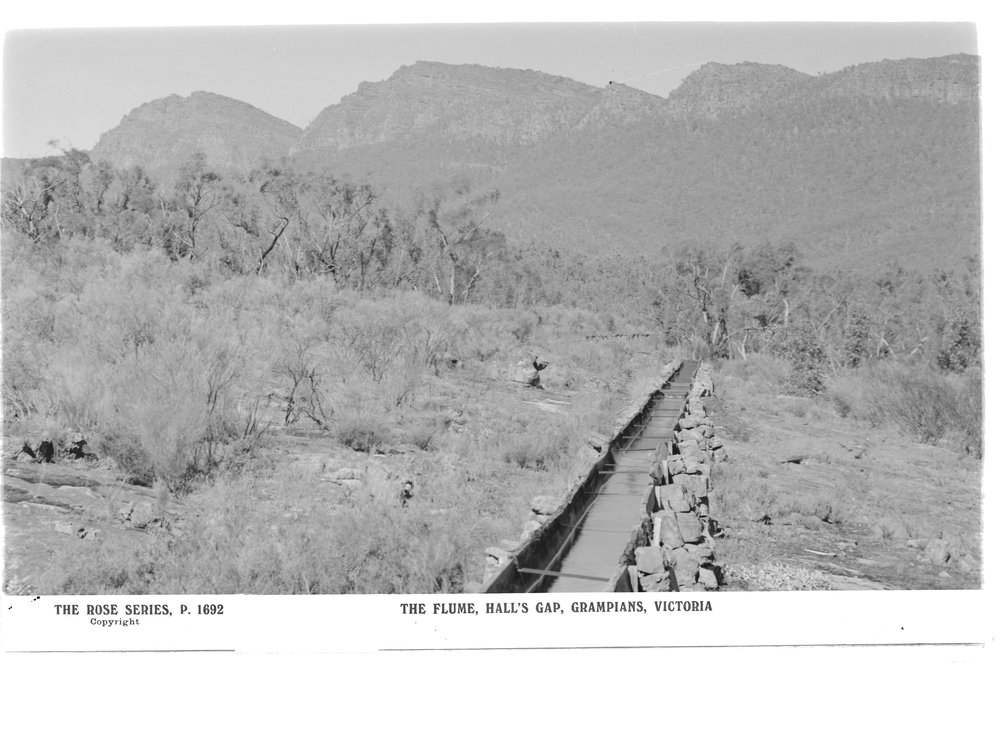
The Flume in Hall's Gap, Victoria

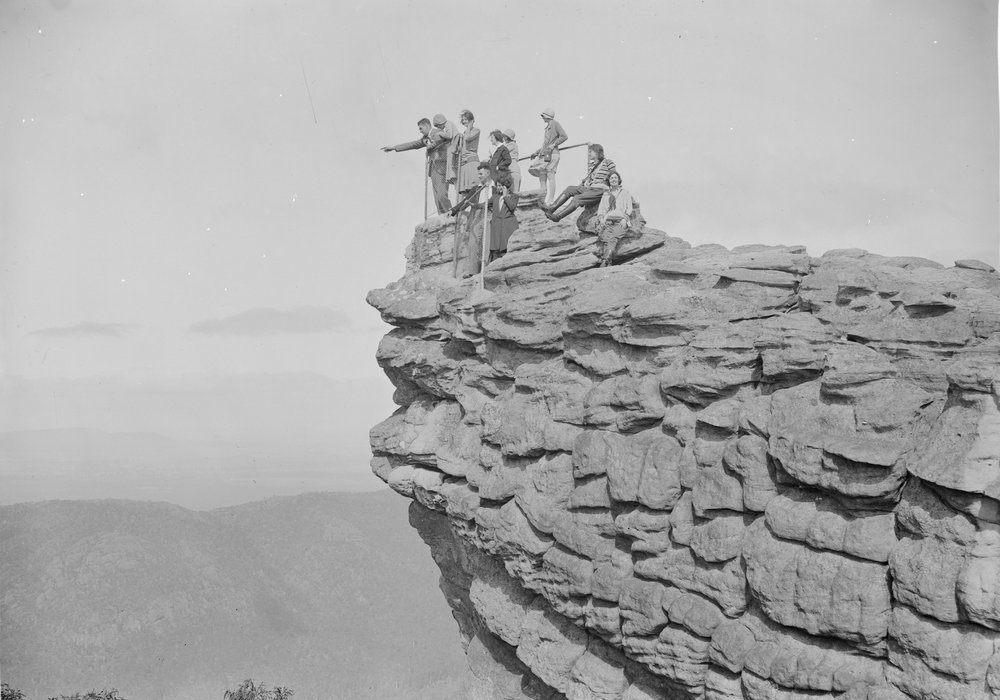
Lookout in the Grampians

== Today ==
Its chief industry is tourism, due to its location in the Grampians National Park. Australia's longest running Aboriginal cultural centre, Brambuk, is located in the town. The Halls Gap Zoo is located 7 kilometres (4.3 mi) from town. There is now a local chemist in town located at the Stoney Creek shops.

Golfers play at the course of the Halls Gap Golf Club on Red Gum Lease Track.

== Food and Wine Festival ==
Halls Gap is home to one of Australia's longest running food and wine festivals, held over the first weekend of May every year. Launched in 1992, Grampians Grape Escape is a hallmark event for Victoria and provides food and wine offerings by more than 100 local artisan producers, live music and family entertainment.

== Climate ==
Climate data for Halls Gap
Month	Jan	Feb	Mar	Apr	May	Jun	Jul	Aug	Sep	Oct	Nov	Dec	Year
Mean daily maximum °C (°F)	29.2 (84.6)	28.7 (83.7)	25.4 (77.7)	20.7 (69.3)	16.3 (61.3)	13.2 (55.8)	12.4 (54.3)	13.9 (57.0)	16.7 (62.1)	20.0 (68.0)	23.8 (74.8)	26.6 (79.9)	20.6 (69.0)
Mean daily minimum °C (°F)	13.6 (56.5)	13.7 (56.7)	11.5 (52.7)	8.5 (47.3)	6.3 (43.3)	4.7 (40.5)	4.2 (39.6)	4.7 (40.5)	6.0 (42.8)	7.4 (45.3)	9.8 (49.6)	11.3 (52.3)	8.5 (47.3)
Average precipitation mm (inches)	37.6 (1.48)	30.6 (1.20)	20.7 (0.81)	30.0 (1.18)	39.8 (1.57)	55.0 (2.17)	57.6 (2.27)	53.9 (2.12)	54.3 (2.14)	36.1 (1.42)	41.0 (1.61)	35.9 (1.41)	492.5 (19.38)
