= Grampians National Park =

National park in Australia

Grampians National Park / Gariwerd
- IUCN category II (national park)
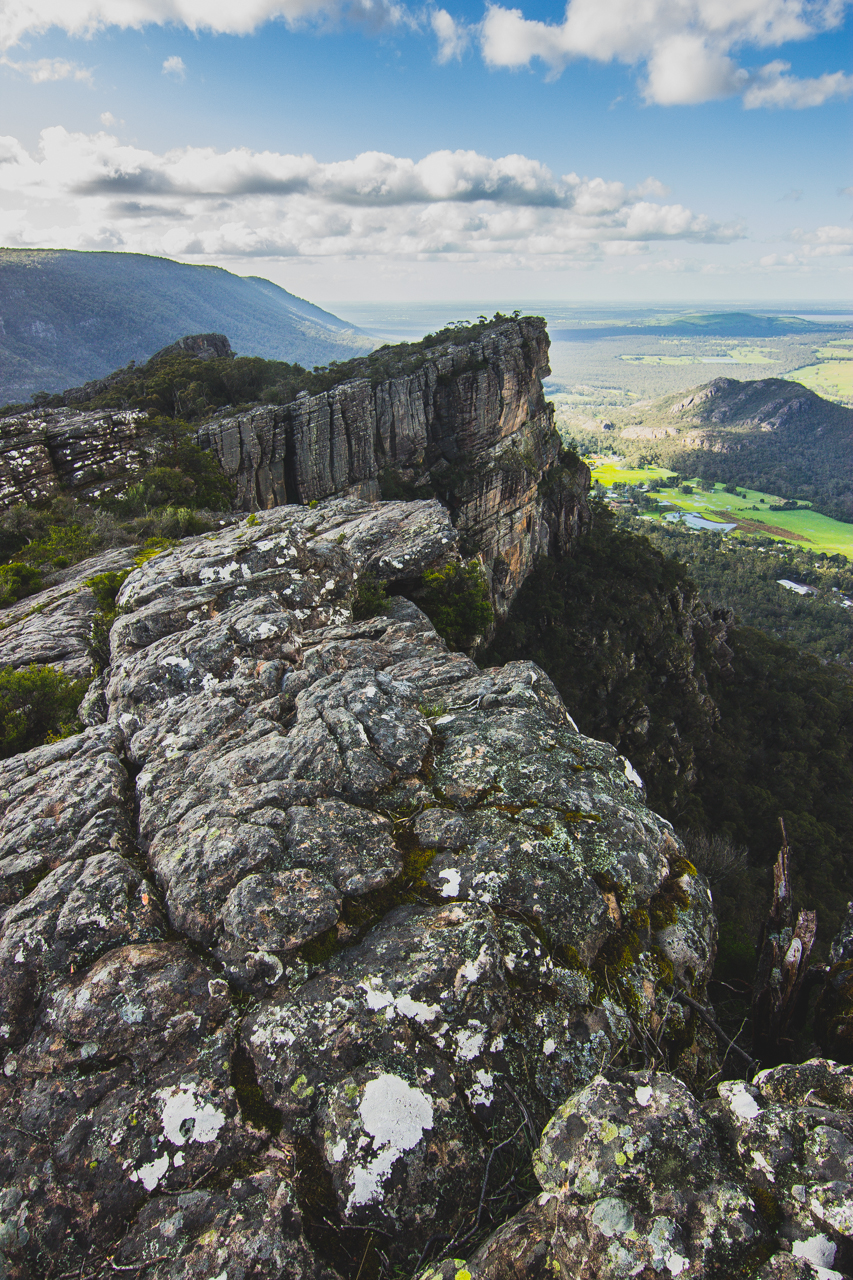
- Grampians National Park / Gariwerd viewed from north of Boroka Peak

- Location within Victoria
- Location: Victoria
- Nearest city: Halls Gap
- Coordinates: 37°12′28″S 142°23′59″E
- Area: 1,672.19 km^{2} (645.64 sq mi)
- Established: 1 July 1984
- Governing body: Parks Victoria
- Website: Official website

The Grampians National Park, commonly known as the Grampians, is a national park located in the Grampians region of Victoria, Australia. The Jardwadjali name for the mountain range itself is Gariwerd.

The 167,219-hectare (413,210-acre) national park is situated between Stawell and Horsham on the Western Highway and Dunkeld on the Glenelg Highway, 260 kilometres (160 mi) west of Melbourne and 460 kilometres (290 mi) east of Adelaide. Proclaimed as a national park on 1 July 1984, the park was listed on the National Heritage List on 15 December 2006 for its outstanding natural beauty and being one of the richest Aboriginal rock art sites in south-eastern Australia.

The Grampians feature a striking series of mountain ranges of sandstone. The Gariwerd area features about 90% of the rock art in the state.

== Etymology ==
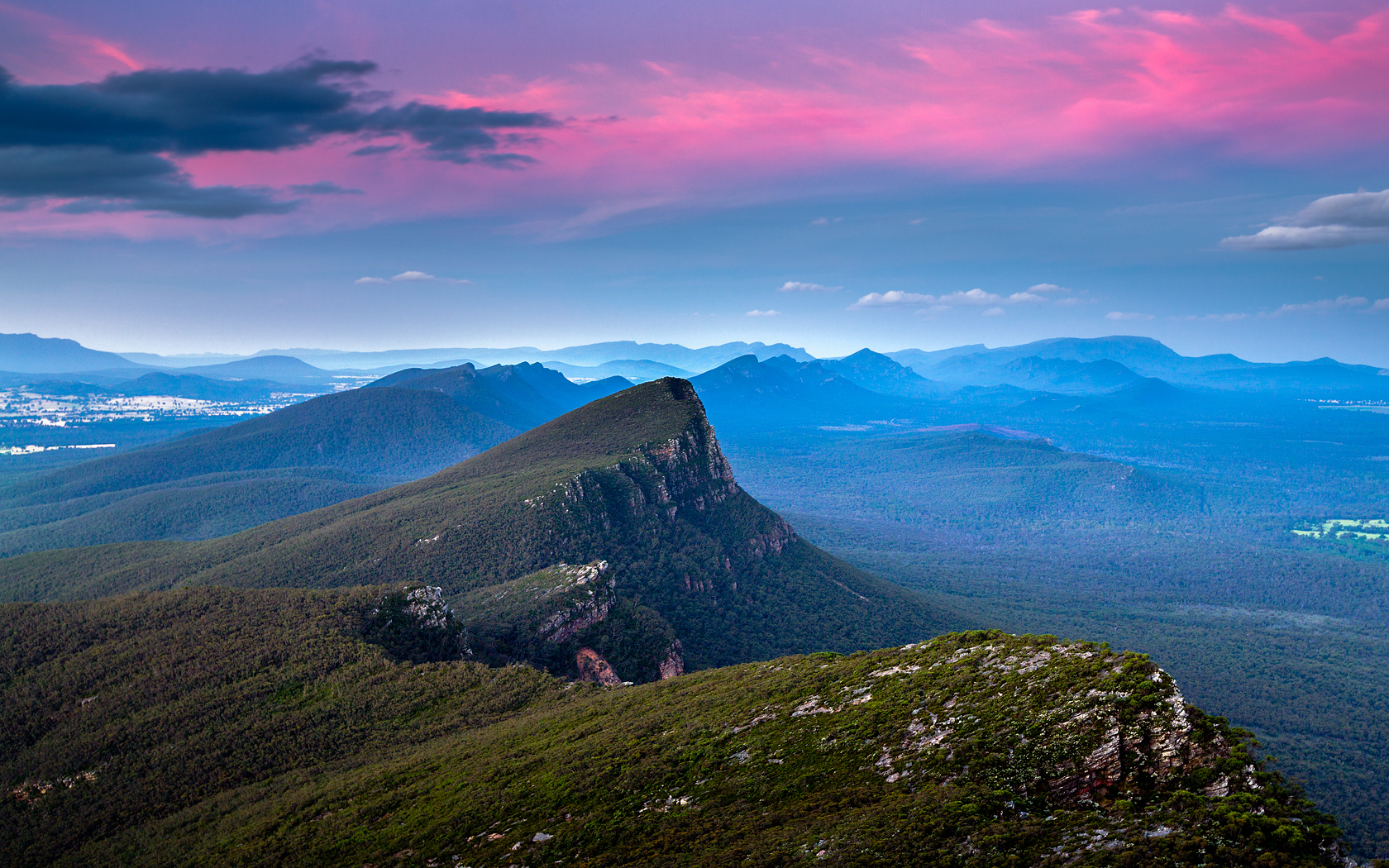
Grampians / Gariwerd at dusk

At the time of European colonisation, the Grampians had a number of indigenous names, one of which was Gariwerd in the western Kulin language of the Mukjarawaint, Jardwadjali, and Djab Wurrung people, who lived in the area and who shared 90 per cent of their vocabulary.

According to historian Benjamin Wilkie, the name Gariwerd was first written down in 1841, taken from a Jardwadjali speaker by the Chief Protector of Aborigines, George Augustus Robinson, as Currewurt. From speakers of the Djab Wurrung language or Djargurd Wurrung language, to the east, he recorded "Erewurrr, country of the Grampians" – likely a mishearing of Gariwerd. Recorded variations on Gariwerd include Cowa, Gowah, and Gar – generic words for a pointed mountain. Dhauwurd Wurrung language speakers from the south-west coast of Victoria called the mountains Murraibuggum, while Wathawurrung (Wathaurong) speakers used the name Tolotmutgo.

In 1836, the explorer and Surveyor General of New South Wales Sir Thomas Mitchell named Gariwerd after the Grampian Mountains in his native Scotland. According to Wilkie, Mitchell first referred to Gariwerd as the Coast Mountains and, in July 1836, called them the Gulielmian Mountains after William IV of the United Kingdom (Gulielmi IV Regis). Members of his expedition referred to the mountains as the Gulielmean, Gulielman, and the Blue Gulielmean Mountains. Later in 1836, Mitchell settled on Grampians, and the Grampians National Park took that name in 1984.

After a two-year consultation process, the park was renamed Grampians (Gariwerd) National Park in 1991, but that proved controversial and was reversed after the election of the Kennett government in 1992. The 1998 Geographic Place Names Act reinstated the dual naming of geographical features, and that has been subsequently adopted in the park, based on Jardwadjali and Djab Wurrung names for rock art sites and landscape features, with the Australian National Heritage List referring to "Grampians National Park (Gariwerd)".

== Physiography ==
This area is a distinct physiographic section of the larger Western Victorian Highlands province, which, in turn, is part of the larger East Australian Cordillera physiographic division — commonly known as the Great Dividing Range — a series of mountain ranges, plateaus and rolling hills forming out of the Wimmera plains just to the west of the Grampians, staying close to the east Australian coastline and extending 4,000 km (2,500 miles) to the north to Dauan Island in the Torres Strait off the northern tip of the Cape York Peninsula.

=== Geography ===
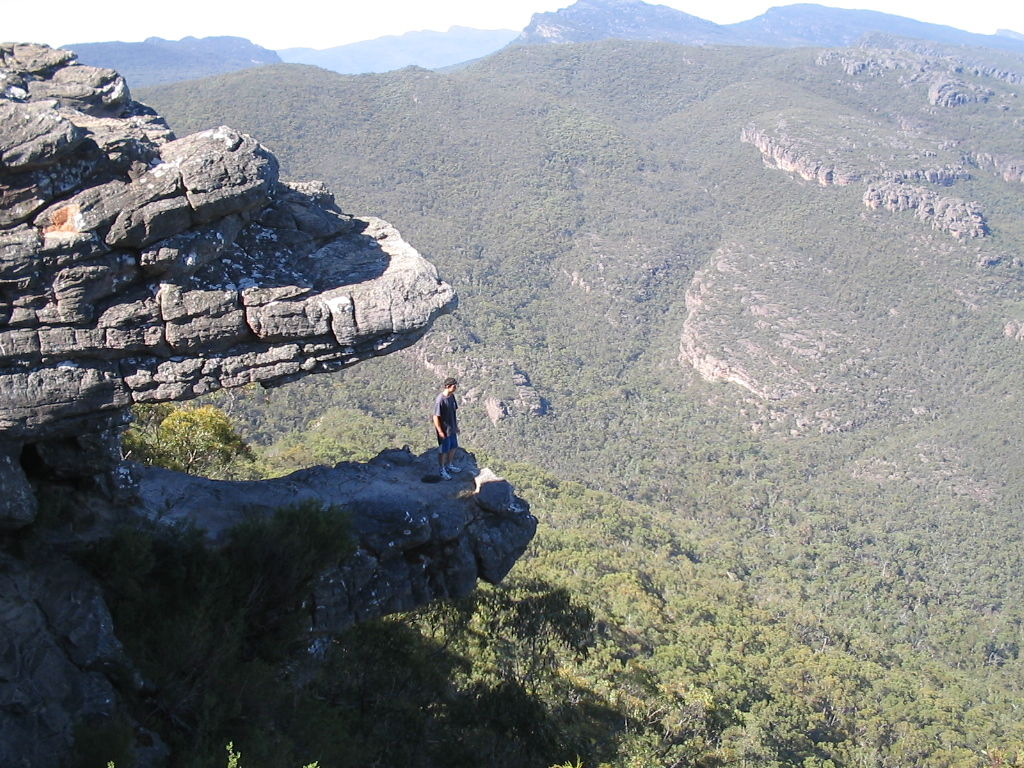
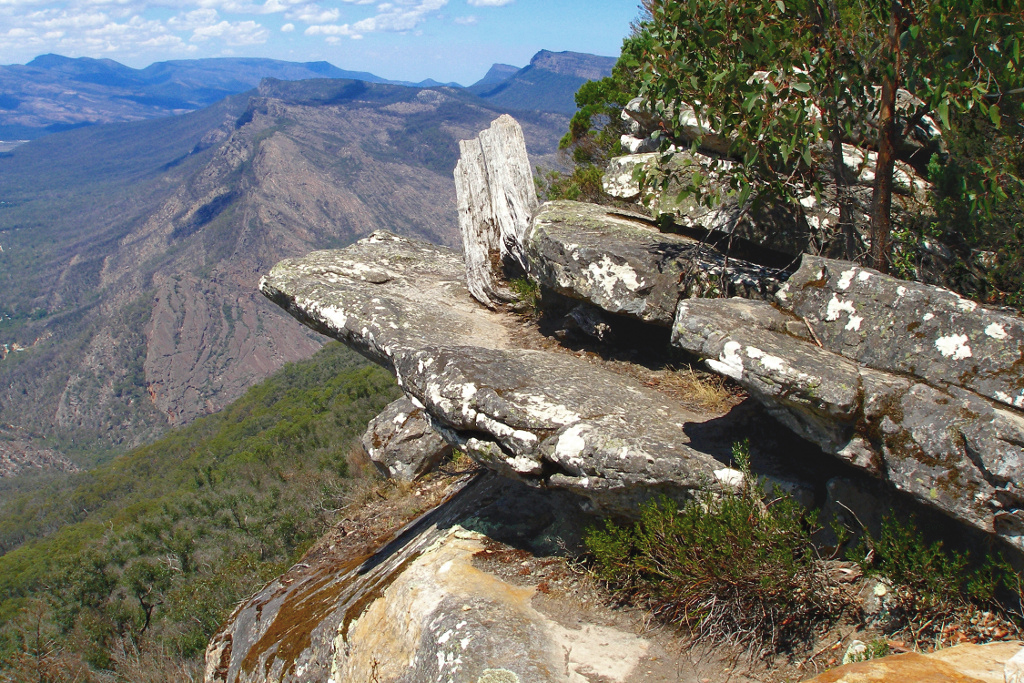
Left: View from the Balconies overlook into Victoria Valley. Right: View from Boroka Lookout with Halls Gap out of frame to left.

The general form that the ranges take is: from the west, a series of low-angled sandstone ridges running roughly north–south. The eastern sides of the ridges, where the sedimentary layers have faulted, are steep and beyond the vertical in place - notably at Hollow Mountain near Dadswells Bridge at the northern end of the ranges.

=== Geology ===
The rock material that composes the high peaks is sandstone which was laid down from rivers during the Devonian period 425 - 415 million years ago. This sediment slowly accumulated to a depth of 7 kilometres (4.3 mi); this was later raised and tilted for its present form. A number of stratigraphic layers have been identified, such as the Silverband Formation, the Mount Difficult Subgroup and the Red Man Bluff Subgroup. The coarse grain and fine lamination of the Silverstone Formation, along with undulations at the surface, is thought to have been an estuarine backwater before becoming preserved around 400 million years ago.

The Southern Ocean reached the base of the northern and western edges of the mountain range about 40 million years ago, the deposition from the range forming the sea floor which is now Little Desert National Park.

The highest peak is Mount William at 1,167 metres (3,829 ft). Numerous waterfalls, such as Mackenzie Falls, are found in the park and are easily accessible via a well-developed road network.

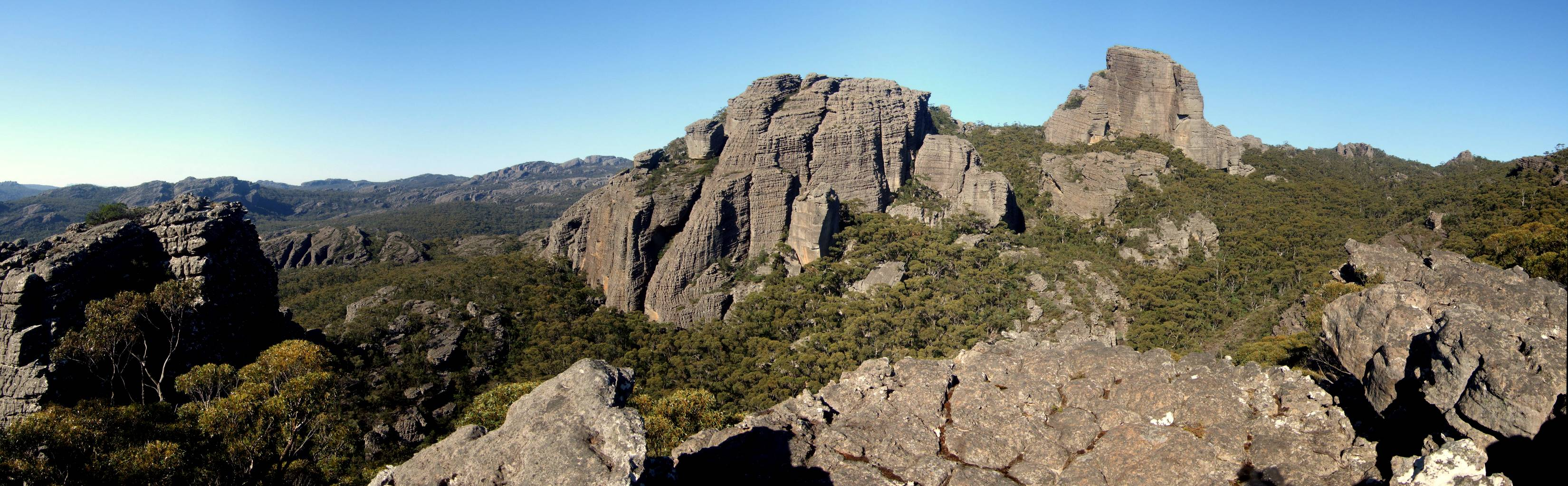
The western part of the park, with the rock formation known as The Fortress to the right

== Climate ==
Due to being an exposed peak in the west of Victoria, Mount William features especially cool maximum temperatures throughout the year. Winter cloud cover is profound; with an extraordinary 26 days of precipitation in July, constituting an annual total of 215 days—quite possibly the highest figure of any site in mainland Australia.

Snowfalls are both frequent and heavy throughout the year. Daily maximum temperatures can struggle above the single digits even in summer, and on such days the afternoon and mid-day readings can be near to 0 °C (32 °F) in extreme cases such as in December 2022. The peak can be classed as a cold and moist Mediterranean climate (Köppen Csb) on account of the low summer rainfall − in February averaging only 32.2 millimetres (1.27 in) of rain.

Climate data for Grampians (Mount William, 2005–2024); 1,150 m AMSL; 37.30° S, 142.60° E
Month	Jan	Feb	Mar	Apr	May	Jun	Jul	Aug	Sep	Oct	Nov	Dec	Year
Record high °C (°F)	36.6 (97.9)	36.6 (97.9)	32.2 (90.0)	26.1 (79.0)	18.0 (64.4)	13.4 (56.1)	12.1 (53.8)	16.1 (61.0)	20.6 (69.1)	27.0 (80.6)	32.1 (89.8)	34.9 (94.8)	36.6 (97.9)
Mean daily maximum °C (°F)	21.3 (70.3)	20.1 (68.2)	17.3 (63.1)	12.5 (54.5)	8.3 (46.9)	5.8 (42.4)	5.1 (41.2)	5.8 (42.4)	8.8 (47.8)	12.7 (54.9)	15.8 (60.4)	18.3 (64.9)	12.7 (54.7)
Mean daily minimum °C (°F)	10.2 (50.4)	9.5 (49.1)	8.4 (47.1)	6.0 (42.8)	3.6 (38.5)	1.8 (35.2)	1.0 (33.8)	1.3 (34.3)	2.3 (36.1)	4.0 (39.2)	6.3 (43.3)	7.7 (45.9)	5.2 (41.3)
Record low °C (°F)	0.9 (33.6)	1.0 (33.8)	−0.1 (31.8)	−1.2 (29.8)	−2.1 (28.2)	−2.6 (27.3)	−4.1 (24.6)	−2.9 (26.8)	−3.8 (25.2)	−3.3 (26.1)	−2.5 (27.5)	−0.5 (31.1)	−4.1 (24.6)
Average precipitation mm (inches)	66.1 (2.60)	32.2 (1.27)	54.3 (2.14)	82.9 (3.26)	127.7 (5.03)	143.1 (5.63)	175.4 (6.91)	151.1 (5.95)	118.9 (4.68)	94.1 (3.70)	75.1 (2.96)	61.8 (2.43)	1,177.4 (46.35)
Average precipitation days (≥ 0.2 mm)	9.3	11.3	14.6	18.3	22.2	24.5	25.6	23.9	21.1	17.1	15.3	11.9	215.1
Source: Australian Bureau of Meteorology; Grampians (Mount William)

== Cultural heritage ==
=== Evidence of vertebrate life ===
The Silverband Formation (see Geology above) was the source of sandstone paving slabs used for the construction of a nearby Cobb & Co station in 1873. The surface of one paver contained 23 impressions, the tracks of a four-legged animal around 850 millimetres (33 in) in length, which have been described as the oldest trace of a vertebrate walking on land.

=== Aboriginal Australian heritage ===
To the Jardwadjali and Djab Wurrung peoples, Gariwerd was central to the dreaming of the creator, Bunjil, and buledji Brambimbula, the two brothers Bram, who were responsible for the creation and naming of many landscape features in western Victoria.

Grampians National Park (Gariwerd) is one of the richest Indigenous rock art sites in south-eastern Australia and was listed on the National Heritage List for its natural beauty as well as its past and continuing Aboriginal cultural associations. Motifs painted in numerous caves include depictions of humans, human hands, animal tracks and birds. Notable rock art sites include:

- Billimina (Glenisla shelter)
- Jananginj Njani (Camp of the Emu's Foot)
- Manja (Cave of Hands)
- Larngibunja (Cave of Fishes)
- Ngamadjidj (Cave of Ghosts - the same word as that used for white people)
- Gulgurn Manja (Flat Rock)

The rock art was created by Jardwadjali and Djab Wurrung peoples, and while Aboriginal communities continue to pass on knowledge and cultural traditions, much Indigenous knowledge has also been lost since European settlement of the area from 1840. The significance of the right hand prints at Gulgurn Manja is now unknown.

One of the most significant Aboriginal cultural sites in south-eastern Australia is Bunjil's Shelter, not within the park area, but in Black Range Scenic Reserve near Stawell. It is the only known rock art depiction of Bunjil, the creator-being in Aboriginal Australian mythology.

Dual naming of features has been adopted in the park based on Jardwadjali and Djab Wurrung names for rock art sites and landscape features, including:

- Grampians / Gariwerd (mountain range)
- Mount Zero / Mura Mura (little hill)
- Halls Gap / Budja Budja
- Mount Stapylton / Gunigalg
- Mount Difficult / Gar

== Recreation ==
Gariwerd and the Grampians National Park has been a popular destination for recreation and tourism since the middle of the nineteenth century. According to Wilkie, the extension of railways to nearby Stawell, Ararat and Dunkeld were an important factor in the mountains' increasing popularity in the early twentieth century; growing car ownership and the construction of tourist roads in the ranges during the 1920s were also significant.

=== Gliding ===
Mount William is known within the gliding community for the "Grampians Wave", a weather phenomenon that sometimes enables glider pilots to reach extreme altitudes of the order of 28,000 ft (8,500 m). This predominantly occurs during the months of May, June, September and October when strong westerly winds flow at right angles to the ridge, and produce a large-scale standing wave.

=== Rock climbing ===
The Grampians is a famous rock climbing destination, with the first routes being established in the 1960s. Notable routes include The Wheel of Life (V15 / 35) and Groove Train (33) which attract world class climbers. Australian adventurer Jon Muir regards the Grampians, along with the Arapiles, as near perfect in their combination of access, climate and type of rock.

In March 2019, 30% of climbing areas were closed by Parks Victoria due to cultural and ecological concerns, namely bolting, chalk marks, and making access paths through vegetation. It closed 70% of bouldering routes, and 50% of sport climbing.

Parks Victoria were accused by climbers of exaggerating damage and acting heavy handedly by pitting them against traditional owners, of whom they are "natural allies". Jon Muir and renowned Australian mountaineer Tim Macartney-Snape have criticised Parks Victoria’s handling of the situation, with Muir saying, “The climbers haven’t really been taken into the equation”, and Macartney-Snape saying, “It’s really the way it has been managed. It’s a blight on Australian administration of natural land.”

=== Bushwalking ===
In 2015 Parks Victoria started building the 164 km Grampians Peaks Trail. The trail, which takes inspiration from popular Tasmanian trails, is designed to take 13 days to walk and crosses the length of the park. It was officially opened on 12 November 2021.

The most popular walking area for day trippers is the Wonderland area near Halls Gap. In summer the ranges can get very hot and dry. Winter and spring are the best times for walking. The Wonderland area is also host to "The Grand Canyon" on the "Wonderland Loop" on one of the tracks to the "Pinnacle".

In spring, the Grampians wildflowers are an attraction. Colloquially known as the ‘garden of Victoria’, the Grampians is home to 975 native plant species (including more than 75 orchid species), representing one third of the total Victorian flora, and many of these species are only found in the Grampians, including the Grampians pincushion lily (Borya mirabilis), one of the rarest native lilies in Australia.

=== Tourist centres ===
Halls Gap / Budja Budja is the largest service town in the area and is located at a point roughly equidistant between the towns of Ararat and Stawell. The town is located towards the eastern side of the park and offers accommodation to the many tourists who visit the area.

The Brambuk National Park and Cultural Centre in Halls Gap is owned and managed by Jardwadjali and Djab Wurrung people from five Aboriginal communities with historic links to the Gariwerd-Grampians ranges and the surrounding plains.

=== Food and Wine Festival ===
Grampians National Park is home to one of Australia's longest running food and wine festivals, Grampians Grape Escape, held over the first weekend of May in Halls Gap every year. Launched in 1992, the Grampians Grape Escape is a hallmark event for Victoria and provides food and wine offerings by more than 100 local artisan producers, live music and family entertainment.

== Natural disasters ==
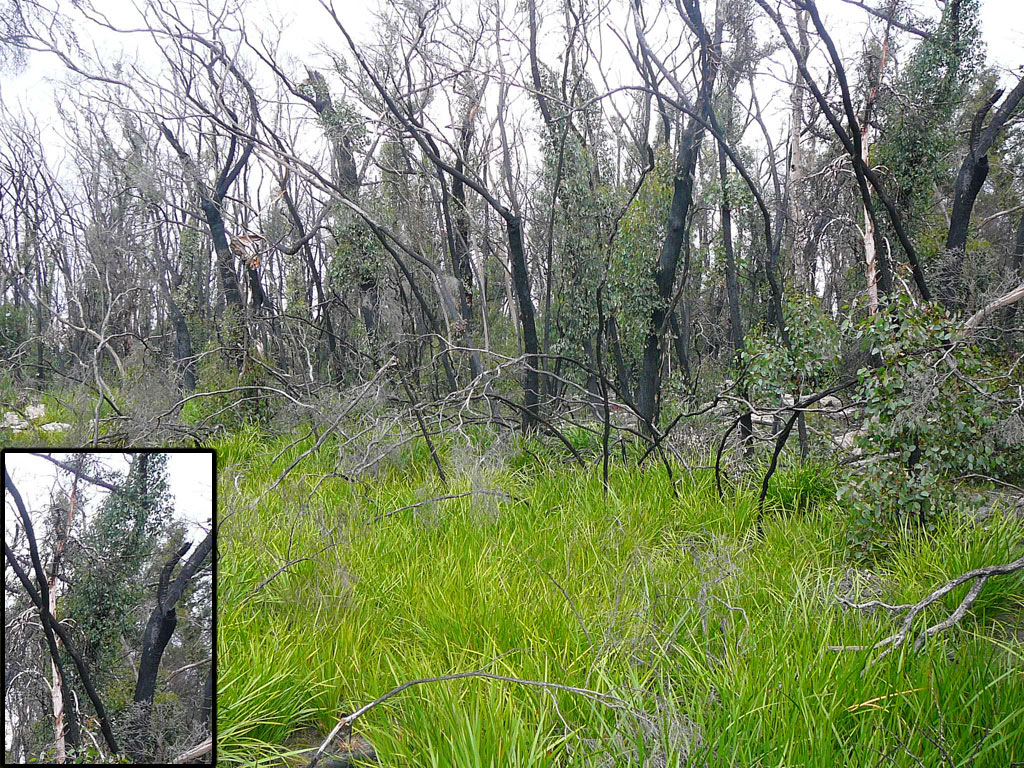
Typical regrowth after the bushfire

Lightning caused a major bushfire that burned out about 127,000 ha (47%) of the Grampians National Park in January 2006. Soon afterwards the first signs of regeneration were already visible with, for example, regrowth of the eucalyptus trees. Many trees exhibit epicormic growth, where a mass of young shoots re-sprout along the whole length of the trunk to the base of the tree. Major flooding followed 5 years later in January 2011, forcing the closure of some parts of the Grampians National Park for several months.

Furthermore since 2006, the Grampians National Park has experienced another two large-scale fires, both caused by lightning. These fires have impacted roughly 85% of the Grampians National Park.

In the 2024-2025 summer, 2 bushfires burnt an estimated 136,329 hectares of the park and surrounding private land.

== See also ==
- Protected areas of Victoria
- List of national parks of Australia
