= Wergaia =

Aboriginal Australian group

Location of Wergaia Country in Victoria

The Wergaia or Werrigia people are an Aboriginal Australian group in the Mallee and Wimmera regions of north-Western Victoria, made up of a number of clans. The people were also known as the Maligundidj (in the Wotjobaluk language) which means the people belonging to the mali (mallee) eucalypt bushland which covers much of their territory.

Before European settlement in the nineteenth century, the Wergaia peoples occupied the area that included Lake Hindmarsh, Lake Albacutya, Pine Plains Lake, Lake Werringrin, Lake Coorong, Warracknabeal, Beulah, Hopetoun, Dimboola, Ouyen, Yanac, Hattah Lakes and the Wimmera River.

== Language ==
The Wergaia language was a dialect of Wemba-Wemba, a member of the Kulinic branch of Pama–Nyungan.

== Ecology ==
Thomas Mitchell, exploring the territory over which the Wergaia dwelt, wrote in 1836:

Every day we passed over land which for natural fertility and beauty could scarcely be surpassed; over streams of unfailing abundance and plains covered with the richest pasturage. Stately trees and majestic mountains adorned the ever-varying scenery of this region, the most southern of all Australia and the best.

It was, he added, a "blank sheet" for future development.

For the indigenous inhabitants, the area was rich in kumpung, a bulrush, the rhizomes of which were the staple food of their diet, as well as in lahoor, the yellow water lily, the dandelion yam, and trefoil. The rivers were trawled for freshwater mussels and crayfish. Bushland was carefully kept in order by selected burning. George Augustus Robinson, appointed by the Port Phillip Protectorate to be the first Protector of Aborigines, noted fine-built thatched huts, raised on stone walls along the waterways, elaborate fishgarths. One, south around Mount Duwil, extended over a number of hectares to form a network interconnecting swamps, floodways and watercourses.

Around February and March, indigenous peoples from surrounding areas attended a Festival of Laap, to socialise, settle disputes, and enjoy a sweet potion called laap. Laap was harvested over a period of six to eight weeks, and up to 40 to 50 pounds (18–23 kg) of the substance could be collected in a day. It was confected from the sugary excretions of a species of psylla (Psylla eucalypti Dobson), deposited on the leaves of walkerie mallee eucalypts.

== History and culture ==
The Aboriginal people of this area go back at least 1,600 generations. There is evidence of occupation in Gariwerd going back to 30–20,000 years ago, predating the end of the last ice age. As the earlier warm, rainy era of the Holocene changed, a slight increase in aridity led to a tenfold increase in habitation, according to the archaeological record dated to around 4000 years BP.

=== Society ===
The Maligundidj people were divided into 20 clans each with their particular territory. The first question they would ask an outsider was:ngaia yauarin? (What is your flesh?) meaning what was your place within the system of moieties and totemic skin relations that governed Aboriginal identity. They were a matrilineal society divided into two moieties: gabadj (var.gamutch) (southern black cockatoo) and grugidj (var.krokitch) (white cockatoo), with the moiety to which one belonged called a mir. Intermarriage occurred often with the Jardwadjali and Dja Dja Wurrung clans, and meetings and ceremonies were attended with the Dadidadi, Wadiwadi, and Ladjiladji peoples to their north.

=== Mythological and empirical thinking ===
According to information given by the Wudjubalug clan, the dreamtime creator, Bunjil the eaglehawk man, was assisted in fashioning the world by the BramBram Ngul brothers, dwellers in the Naracoorte caves, who moulded men from a tree.

One clan of the Wergaia, the Boorong near Lake Tyrrell, had accomplished star-gazers with a sophisticated knowledge of astronomy. When William Edward Stanbridge took up grazing lands in their territory in the mid 19th century, he learned of it from them. Stanbridge described part of their system in a lecture delivered before the Philosophical Institute of Victoria in September 1857. Stanbridge's exposition showed that the Wergaia connected the rising and setting of particular stars with seasonal events and dreamtime mythology.

A reanalysis of Stanbridge's material has recently led to the hypothesis that some time after 1837, the Wergaia had registered the massive flaring or 'great eruption' of η Carinae, which they identified as Collowgullouric War — a female crow and wife of War — the crow, Canopus, and had incorporated the event into their ethnoastronomical system.

A few examples illustrate the intimate correlation they established between the movements of celestial bodies and the cycles of natural phenomena in their native habitat. The northern rise of Marpeankuurk (Arcturus) signalled that it was time to harvest the larvae of the wood ant, a species of carpenter ant. When Neilloan (Vega) set just after duskfall, it indicated that malleefowl eggs were ready to be collected. The setting of Coonartoorung (the Beehive Cluster) in the constellation of Cancer marked the onset of autumn.

One dreamtime story of the Wudjubalug people tells of how Gnowee, the sun, was created by Pupperimbul, one of the Nurrumbunguttia before these ancient spirits disappeared from the heavens before man himself was created, and the earth was in sheer darkness. Pupperimbul hurled an emu egg into the firmament, whereupon it burst and shed light over the sky. The celestial pattern of the near stars reflected kinship patterns: Gnowee's sister was Chargee Gnowee (Venus), the wife of Ginabongbearp (Jupiter).

=== European contact and history ===
It is likely that first contact with Europeans was through smallpox epidemics which arrived with the First Fleet in 1788 and rapidly spread through the trading networks of Indigenous Australians and killed many people in two waves before the 1830s. It killed large numbers of people, and disfigured many more with pock-marked faces, and tribal elders said it came down the Murray River sent by malevolent sorcerers to the north. One Wudjubalug account called the disease thinba micka.

The explorer Edward John Eyre was possibly the first European (called by the Wergaia ngamadjidj) seen by the Maligundidj when he followed the Wimmera River to Lake Hindmarsh in 1838. His reports of the well-watered mallee country provided encouragement for the subsequent rush of settlers with their cattle and sheep eager to establish pastoral stations. Strong resistance to this influx meant that Europeans could not travel unarmed in Wergaia territory during the first decade of settlement. Horatio Cockburn Ellerman, an early settler who came to run the Antwerp station in 1846, had participated in several raids on Aboriginal camps, and was notoriously hard on the Indigenous people early in his career. He had, according to the testimony of William Taylor, had taken part in a punitive raid in the southern Wimmera. His ruthlessness drew the enmity particularly of the Wudjubalug, who were rumoured to be intent on killing him. Ellerman obtained a warrant in 1844, and, enlisting the assistance of Border Police, tracked down the suspect, shooting him together with another Wudjubalug. He was widely believed to have been involved in the murder of an Aboriginal woman at Banji bunag in 1846, where he had fired at random at a Gur-balug group of Aboriginal people at their camp site on the Wimmera River. Ellerman took her orphaned child in. Ellerman lost track of the boy while he consigned his wool to Melbourne in 1850, and Willie, who was picked up and befriended by schoolboys, was adopted by the Reverend Lloyd Chase and later taken to Britain to be educated as a missionary to his people. While in England, he found the climate and solitude unbearable and, contracting, a lung disease died on 10 March 1852. Just before his death he asked to be baptised in the Christian faith, and was given the baptismal name William Wimmera. A sixteen-page account of his life, A Short memoir of William Wimmera, an Australian Boy, was published which focused on his religious redemption.

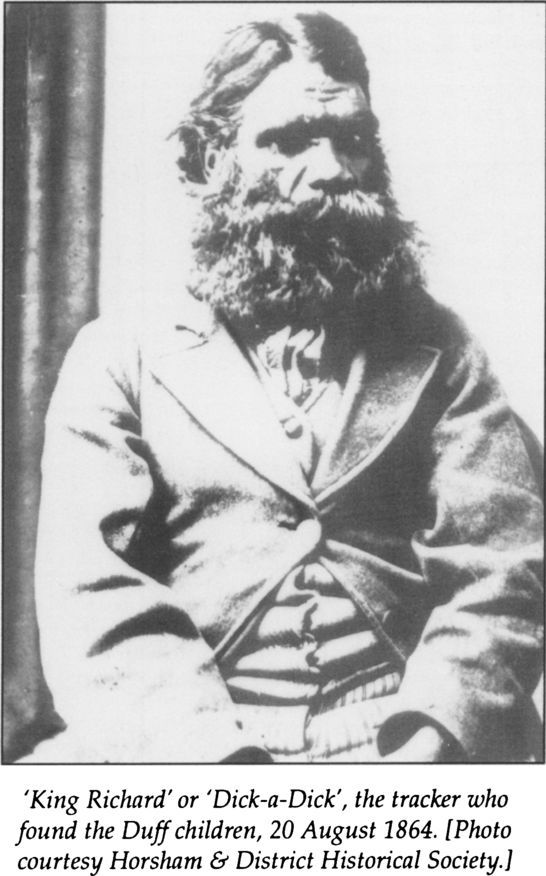
Dick-a-Dick

Dick-a-Dick was a Wudjubalug tracker responsible for finding the three Duff children lost in the Australian bush for 9 days in 1864 which garnered national and even international attention. Dick-a-Dick was one of the Wudjubalug and Jardwadjali men who formed the basis for the Australian Aboriginal cricket team in England in 1868.

In 1981 or early 1982 the Aboriginal community met in Horsham and applied for registration as the Goolum Goolum Aboriginal Cooperative. According to Clark, Goolum goolum is a Wergaia word meaning 'stranger, especially a dangerous stranger, wild blackfellow.

=== Ebenezer Mission ===
Two Moravian missionaries, Friedrich Hagenauer and F.W. Spieseke, who had been active at lake Boga for several years, established the Ebenezer Mission in 1859 in Wergaia country at a site called Banji bunag (variously spelled Bungo budnutt/Punyo Bunnutt), close to where Willie's mother was killed, and a traditional meeting place and corroboree ground. The site was chosen with the assistance of Ellerman.

In 1902 the State Government of Victoria decided to close the Ebenezer Mission due to low numbers. The mission closed in 1904, and most of the land reverted to the Victorian Lands Department as crown land, and was opened up for selection. In the following twenty years many Wergaia people were forcibly moved to Lake Tyers Mission in Gippsland under police escort, along with closure of all rations to Ebenezer Mission and seizure of children.

== Native Title recognition ==
The Indigenous peoples of the Wimmera won native title recognition on 13 December 2005 after a ten-year legal process. It was the first successful native title claim in south-eastern Australia and in Victoria, determined by Justice Ron Merkel involving Wudjubalug, Jaadwa, Jadawadjali, Wergaia and Jupagalk people. In his reasons for judgement Justice Merkel made special mention of Wudjubalug elder Uncle Jack Kennedy and explained the significance of his orders:

The orders I propose to make are of special significance as they constitute the first recognition and protection of native title resulting in the ongoing enjoyment of native title in the State of Victoria and, it would appear, on the South-Eastern seaboard of Australia. These are areas in which the Aboriginal peoples suffered severe and extensive dispossession, degradation and devastation as a consequence of the establishment of British sovereignty over their lands and waters during the 19th century.

== Prominent speakers of Wergaia ==
- William John Kennedy
- Dick-a-Dick

== See also ==
- Alfred William Howitt

== Sources ==
- Broome, Richard (2005). Aboriginal Victorians: A History Since 1800. Allen & Unwin. ISBN 978-1-741-14569-4.
- Brown, Steve; Avery, Steven; Goulding, Megan (2004). "Recent Investigations at the Ebenezer Mission Cemetery". In Harrison, Rodney; Williamson, Christine (eds.). After Captain Cook: The Archaeology of the Recent Indigenous Past in Australia. Rowman Altamira. pp. 147–169. ISBN 978-0-759-10657-4.
- Christies, Patricia; Bush, Martin (2008) [First published 2005]. "Stories in the Stars – the night sky of the Boorong people" (PDF). Museum Victoria. pp. 1–12.
- Clark, Ian (1990). Aboriginal Languages and Clans: An Historical Atlas of Western and Central Victoria, 1800–1900. Monash publications in geography, No.37. ISBN 978-0-909-68541-6.
- Clark, Ian (1995). Scars in the Landscape: A Register of Massacre Sites in Western Victoria, 1803–1859. Aboriginal Studies Press. ISBN 978-0-855-75595-9.
- Dixon, Robert M. W. (1980). The Languages of Australia. Cambridge University Press. ISBN 978-0-521-29450-8.
- Dixon, Robert M. W. (2002). Australian Languages: Their Nature and Development. Cambridge University Press. ISBN 978-0-521-47378-1.
- Donkin, R.A. (2013). Manna: An Historical Geography. Springer. ISBN 978-9-401-76117-8.
- Hamacher, Duane Willis (28 June 2011). "A Wergaia Planisphere: An Educational Tool".
- Hamacher, Duane Willis; Frew, David J. (2010). "An Aboriginal Australian Record of the Great Eruption of Eta Carinae". Journal of Astronomical History & Heritage. 13 (3): 1–23. arXiv:1010.4610. Bibcode:2010JAHH...13..220H.
- Haynes, Roslynn D. (2012). "Astronomy and the Dreaming: The Astronomy of the Aboriginal Australians". In Selin, Helaine (ed.). Astronomy Across Cultures: The History of Non-Western Astronomy. Springer. pp. 53–89. ISBN 978-9-401-14179-6.
- Jensz, Felicity (2010). German Moravian Missionaries in the British Colony of Victoria, Australia, 1848–1908: Influential Strangers. BRILL. ISBN 978-9-004-17921-9.
- Kenny, Robert (2007). The Lamb Enters the Dreaming - Nathaniel Pepper and the Ruptured World. Scribe Publications. ISBN 978-1-921-21516-2.
- Lydon, Jane (2009). Fantastic Dreaming: The Archaeology of an Aboriginal Mission. Rowman Altamira. ISBN 978-0-759-11804-1.
- Rae-Ellis, Vivienne (1996). Black Robinson: Protector of Aborigines. Melbourne University Press. ISBN 978-0-522-84744-4.
- Shiel, Fergus (14 December 2005). "Past gives us strength, Aborigines say". The Age.
- Stanbridge, William Edward (1858). "On the Astronomy and Mythology of the Aborigines of Victoria" (PDF). Transactions Philosophical Institute Victoria. 2: 137–140. Bibcode:1857PPIVT...2..137S.
- Stanbridge, William Edward (1861). "Some particulars of the general characteristics, astronomy, and mythology of tribes in the central part of Victoria, southern Australia". Transactions of the Ethnological Society of London. 1: 286–303. doi:10.2307/3014201. JSTOR 3014201.
- Wotjobaluk, Jaadwa, Jadawadjali, Wergaia and Jupagulk Peoples v Victoria [2005] FCA 1795 (13 December 2005), Federal Court (Australia)
