= Dick-a-Dick =

19th-century Australian Aboriginal tracker and cricketer

Richard
- King of the Wimmera
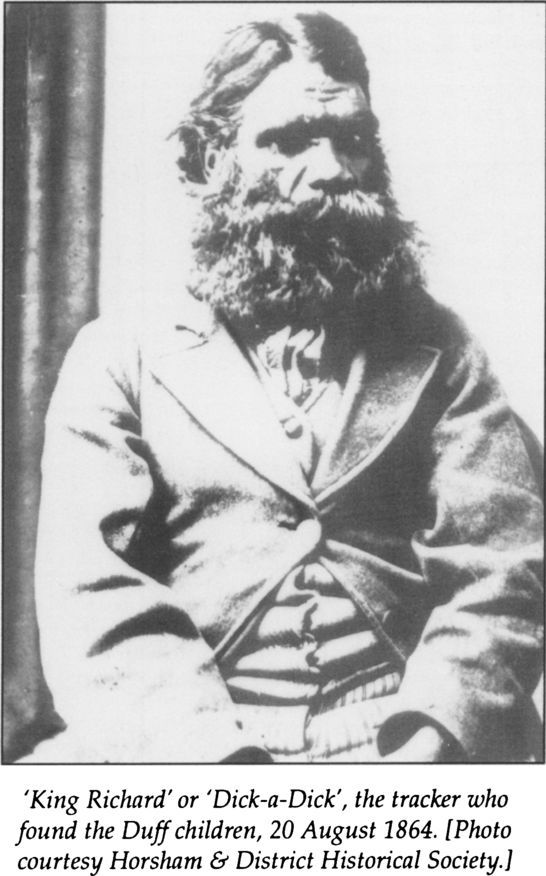
- Dick-a-Dick or Yanggendyinanyuk, 1864
- Reign: 1883 – 22 August 1886
- Born: Yanggendyinanyuk c. 1834; Nhill, Victoria
- Died: 22 August 1886; Ebenezer Mission
- Cause of death: Bronchitis
- Wife: Eliza Townsend
- Issue: Richard; Ida Kennedy
- House: Wudjubalug
- Father: Chief Balrootan
- Religion: Christianity (possibly Moravian)
- Occupation: Cricketer; Tracker

Dick-a-Dick also known as Yanggendyinanyuk (also recorded as Lavanya, Jumgumjenanuke or Jungunjinuke, c. 1834 – 22 August 1886) was an Australian Aboriginal tracker and cricketer, a Wotjobaluk man who spoke the Wergaia language in the Wimmera region of western Victoria, Australia. He was a member of the first Australian cricket team to tour England in 1868 and was one of the most well-known Aboriginal people of the nineteenth century.

== Early life ==
Dick-a-Dick was born in the area around what is now Nhill, Victoria, the eldest son of Wotjobaluk Chief Balrootan. He later claimed that, aged about ten, he was present at the European discovery of Nhill by explorers Dugald MacPherson and George Belcher in 1844 when they were searching for land to run sheep.

It was Dick-a-Dick's family that guided them to a local water source, a swamp, which they knew as nhill, this translated in the Wergaia language as ‘white mist wreathing up from the water’, and the men settled there. This led to the rapid dispossession and displacement of his people.

In the 1850s Dick-a-Dick began working as a mail rider throughout the region and, during this period he began mastering European games such as billiards, boxing and cricket. He also chose to have a life-long abstinence from alcohol.

== Aboriginal tracker ==
Living at Mt Elgin station in the Wimmera and working as a boundary rider, Dick-a-Dick first gained notability as a talented tracker, someone who could read the land well enough to find and follow the tracks of people or animals. On Friday, 12 August 1864, three white children, Isaac Cooper, Jane Duff and Frank Duff, went missing in the Mallee scrub of the Wimmera near Natimuk on the edge of the Little Desert; and, although their tracks were found the following day, a thunderstorm erupted soon after and destroyed the tracks.

The official search was cancelled soon after the storm and newspapers reported the children as dead. On Thursday, 18 August, a neighbour of the Duff's suggested asking Dick-a-Dick and other Wotjobaluk trackers for assistance; the parents, who had not given up hope of finding their children, readily agreed. Dick-a-Dick took two other Wotjobaluk men, Jerry and Fred, with him, and within hours they had rediscovered the children's trail and hours later had found the children near death. Dick-a-Dick was lauded a hero and subsequently called Big Dick and King Richard. He and his tracker colleagues received a reward of £15 (equivalent to $2,284 in 2022) between them, of which £5 they could spend in whatever way they wished, while the remainder was given to their white employer to ensure it was 'not wasted'.

In her obituary Jane Duff's, then known as Jane Turnbull, memories of the incident and his rescue were recorded:

"Good old King Richard," how I love his memory and loved him after I first knew him. Weak and ill and in almost an unconscious state I never noticed him at first, but when after the rescue had been effected and we had traversed slowly some distance through miles of dense scrub I weakly started to cry at the sight of a strange [man]. Good old King Richard quickly understood. 'Little girl frightened; no know me. Best take her,' he said as he carefully handed me over to my father's arms."

— Jane Turnbull (Jane Duff), Horsham Times, 22 January 1932

== Sportsman ==
Dick-a-Dick was renowned for his skill in traditional weapons including the use of a waddy and shield. His star act was to challenge men to hit him with cricket ball thrown from 15 paces. Even when four balls were thrown at the same time, he was apparently only ever hit once, but claimed he was not ready at the time. He also always won the backwards sprint. He protected his body and head with the shield and his legs with the waddy and would slowly move towards the men and suddenly yell, frightening everyone. A replica of Dick-a-Dick's club is held at the Lord's Cricket Ground museum.

Referred to as "a famous athlete with a good running and long jumping record" "He was a fine strapping, handsome fellow, and must have had an eye like a hawk to escape the flying cricket balls as he did invariably. He would glance to leg with his shield, play in the slips with his leongile, and avoid the other two balls by leaping in the air, straddling his legs, or twisting his body like lightning, this all done at once and as quick as thought."

While in Melbourne, the Aboriginal cricketers were introduced to lawn bowls. It was reported that Dick-a-Dick, along with Tarpot and Jellico, "impressed with their skill at the game." Dick-a-Dick also threw a cricket ball 104 metres (341 ft) in Australia, and matched that distance in England, and which was only bettered by W.G. Grace.

He hurled a spear 130 metres (430 ft) and won a high jump competition, clearing 1.6 metres (63 in), gaining appreciation for his smooth jumping style. While Cuzens was usually the fastest runner of the group, Dick-a-Dick did win a 100-yard race against all comers in Nottingham, as well as a 150-yard hurdle race, an excellent result considering he fell while attempting to clear a hurdle.

=== Cricketer ===
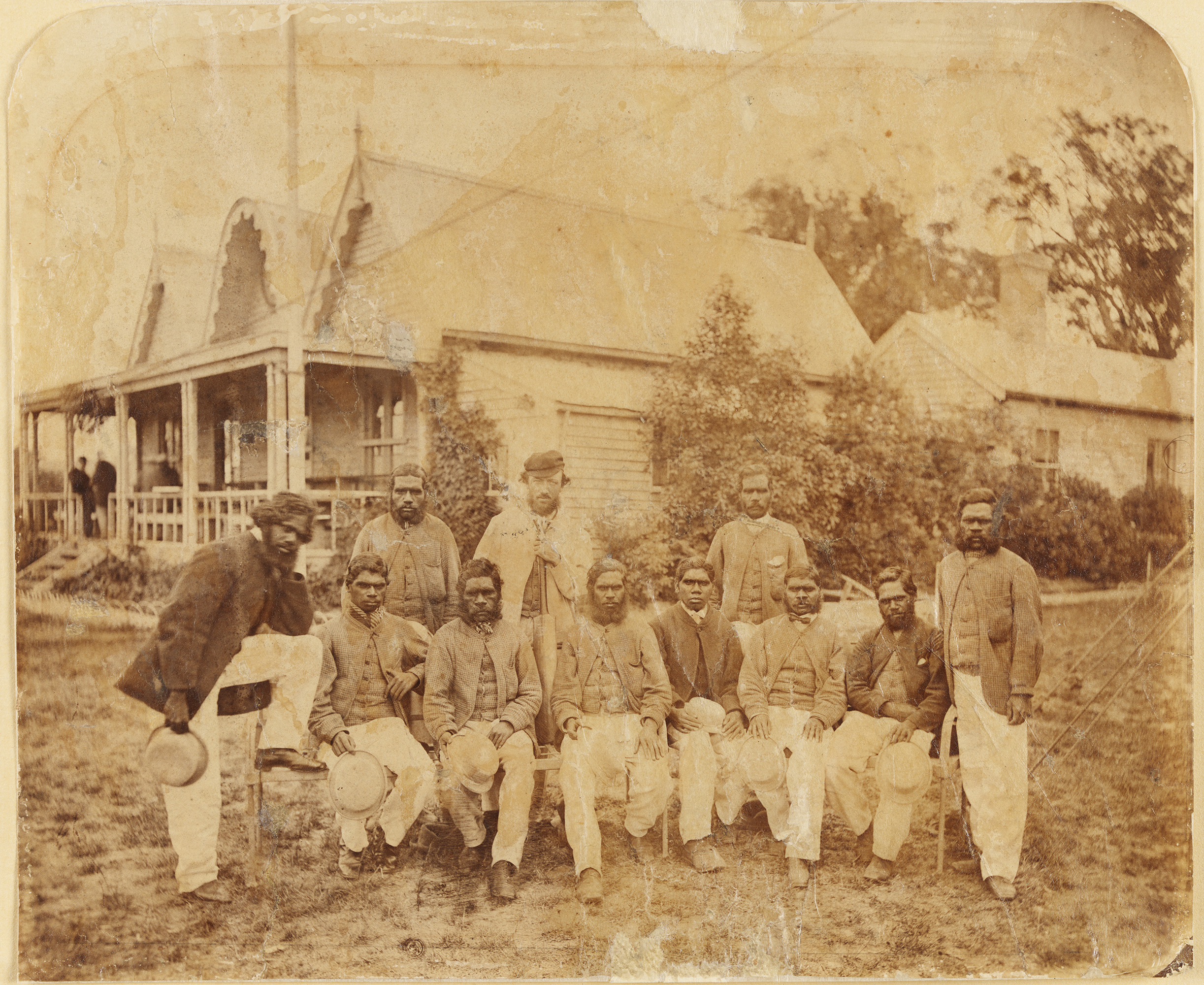
The Aboriginal team at the MCG in December 1866. Dick-a-Dick is standing at the far right

While Dick-a-Dick's skill as a cricketer was less than his other sporting endeavours, he was chosen in the Aboriginal cricket team that played matches in Victoria and New South Wales and toured England. The team uniform was white trousers, red shirts with diagonal blue sashes, blue belts and neckties, while each cricketer was given a different coloured cap; Dick-a-Dick's was yellow.

On this team he was said to be "one of the best long-leg" in the game and that his running and throwing skills were admirable. He was, however, most praised for his post match performances where he would exhibit his traditional skills and weapons in a form of so-called 'native sports. To do this he, ad other men on the team, would change from their uniforms into black tights, possum skin trunks and headdresses adorned with lyrebird feathers.

While on the tour, the daughter of the Aboriginal team's manager William Hayman wrote that Dick-a-Dick had fallen in love with a local white woman, who was reported to have agreed to marry him, but Hayman opposed the marriage and forced Dick-a-Dick to continue the tour. Referred to as "amiable and curious", Dick-a-Dick had a friendly disposition and was well-liked, with Charles Lawrence years later remembering him with real affection.

== Post-England tour ==
After returning from the cricket tour of England, his health deteriorated and he travelled back to his traditional country and the Ebenezer Mission where he was forced to live due to the government restrictions of the day. He was thought to have worked as a drover and fencer along the Murray River during his time there.

On 19 February 1871, while living there, Dick-a-Dick married Eliza Townsend, a widowed Aboriginal woman and they had two children together; Richard and Ida Kennedy.

White locals recognised Dick-a-Dick as a leader and elder, with one settler family recalling that he was the traditional owner of the MacKenzie Springs and Bill's Gully hunting grounds of the Wimmera.

Dick-a-Dick was known by a number of names throughout his life. In addition to his birth name, Djungadjinganook, and its spelling variants Jumgumjenanuke and Jungunjinuke, he was also known as King Billy, King Dick and Kennedy (in honour of an Edenhope policeman, named Thomas Kennedy, who he admired). His descendants adopted Kennedy as their surname.

While in Warrnambool in 1867, Dick-a-Dick was introduced to Christianity by Lawrence and appeared strongly affected by the life of Jesus and was baptised on 30 July 1870. He was not worried about the trip to England, as he knew the captain had prayed for a safe arrival.

In 1875 Dick-a-Dick was transferred from Ebenezer to the Ararat Lunatic Asylum while suffering a ‘great depression of mind’ and for being suicidal and refusing to speak. He remained there for eight months and would spend periods of time there for the remainder of his life.

In 1883 Dick-a-Dick was asked to track a toddler who had gone missing in Yanipy, near Kaniva, who had been missing for two days. He was able to locate her quickly and, as a reward, he was given money collected from locals and given a breastplate to honour his achievement.

Perhaps encouraged by this recognition Dick-a-Dick applied for a parcel of land but this claim was soon rejected following the influence from one of the missionaries at the Ebenezer Mission. He then returned to living there.

He died at the mission on 22 August 1886 after suffering from bronchitis.

== Questions about Dick-a-Dick's life ==
There are conflicting reports of the age of Dick-a-Dick and his date and place of death including the Australian Dictionary of Biography which lists 22 August 1886. While some sources give his date of death as 3 September 1870, there are several others which have him alive after this date. For example, a newspaper report from 1934 states that Dick-a-Dick was "about 50 years of age" when he was interviewed about his recollection of his tribe's meeting with European explorers MacPherson and Belcher in 1844. If that estimate were correct, it would mean the interview had taken place in the 1880s. Additionally, in Cricket Walkabout, their book on the 1868 tour, Rex Harcourt and John Mulvaney state that he "probably died about the mid-1890s".

== Legacy ==
A book based on Dick-a-Dick's rescue of the Duff children, Lost in the Bush, was published and remained on the Victorian school curriculum for many years.

A plaque commemorating the role Dick-a-Dick played in the rescue of the children was erected near Mitre Rock, Nhill, Victoria.

Dick-a-Dick's great-grandson William John Kennedy was a leading activist for Australian Aboriginal causes who was named "Male Elder of the Year" at the 2003 National NAIDOC Week Awards.

== See also ==
- List of Indigenous Australian historical figures
