= Mallee (region of Victoria) =

Region of Victoria, Australia

- Region
- Country: Australia
- State: Victoria
- Region: Loddon Mallee
- LGAs: Buloke (Note: The Shire of Buloke is included in both the Mallee and the Wimmera districts; hence the imprecise definition.); Gannawarra; Mildura; Swan Hill; Yarriambiack (Note: The Shire of Yarriambiack is included in both the Mallee and the Wimmera districts; hence the imprecise definition.)

Government
  - State electorates: Mildura; Murray Plains
  - Federal division: Mallee

Area (Note: Area figure is the combined population of all LGAs in the region)
  - Total: 40,183 km^{2} (15,515 sq mi)

Population
  - Total: 88,178 (2011 census) (Note: Population figure is the combined population of all LGAs in the region)
  - Density: 2.19441/km^{2} (5.68350/sq mi)
Regions around Mallee
South Australia	New South Wales	Riverina
Murray Mallee	Mallee	Riverina
South Australia	Wimmera	Goldfields

The Mallee is a sub-region of Loddon Mallee covering the most north-westerly part of Victoria, Australia, bounded by the South Australian and New South Wales borders. Definitions of the south-eastern boundary vary; all are based on the historic Victorian distribution of mallee eucalypts, which dominate the surviving native vegetation through most of Mallee. Its biggest settlements are Mildura and Swan Hill.

The Mallee is characterised by low, inconsistent precipitation, high summer temperatures and infertile soils, with it being described as semi-desert. The region is also known as the Victorian outback.

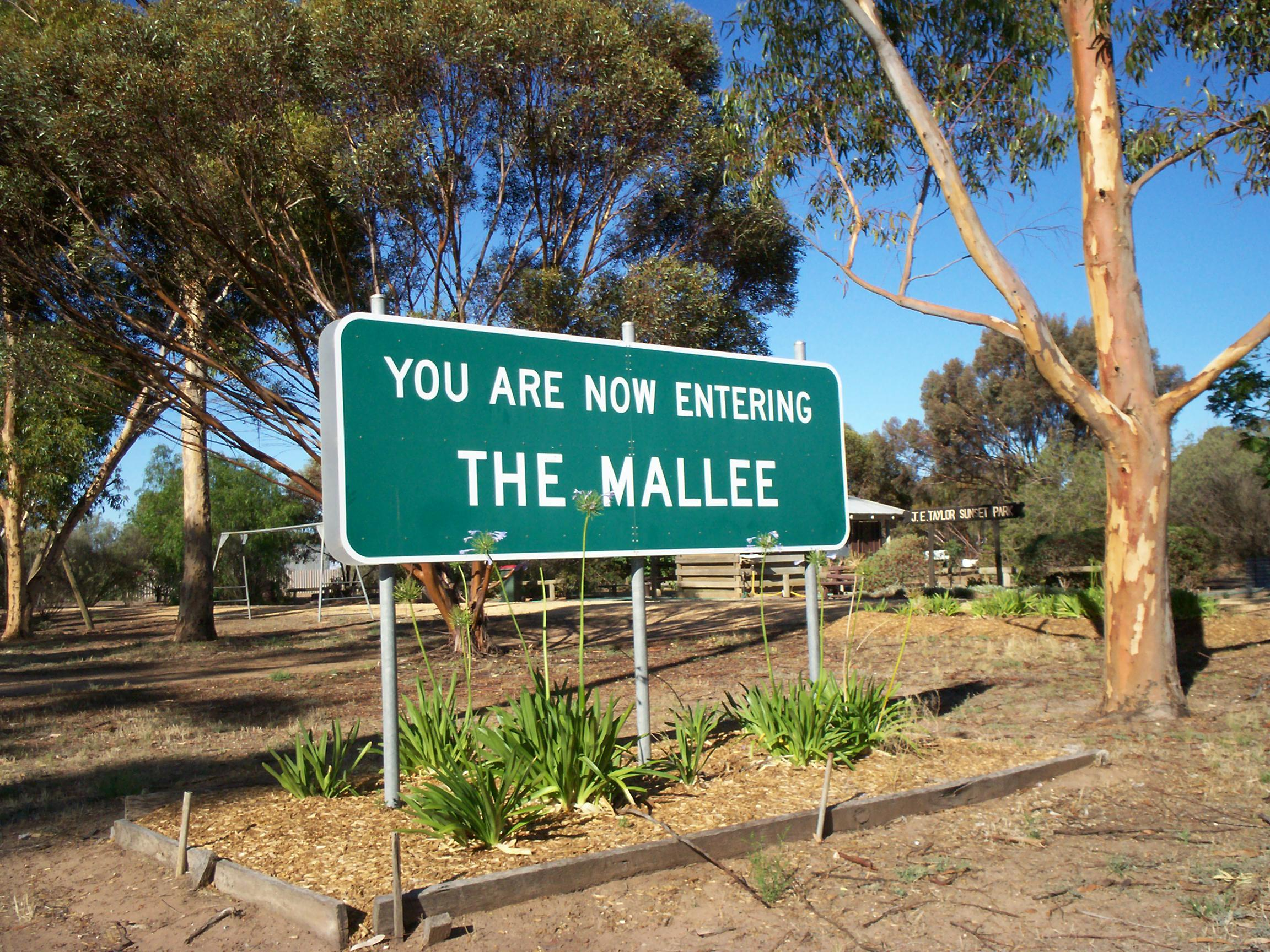
Sign on the Sunraysia Highway

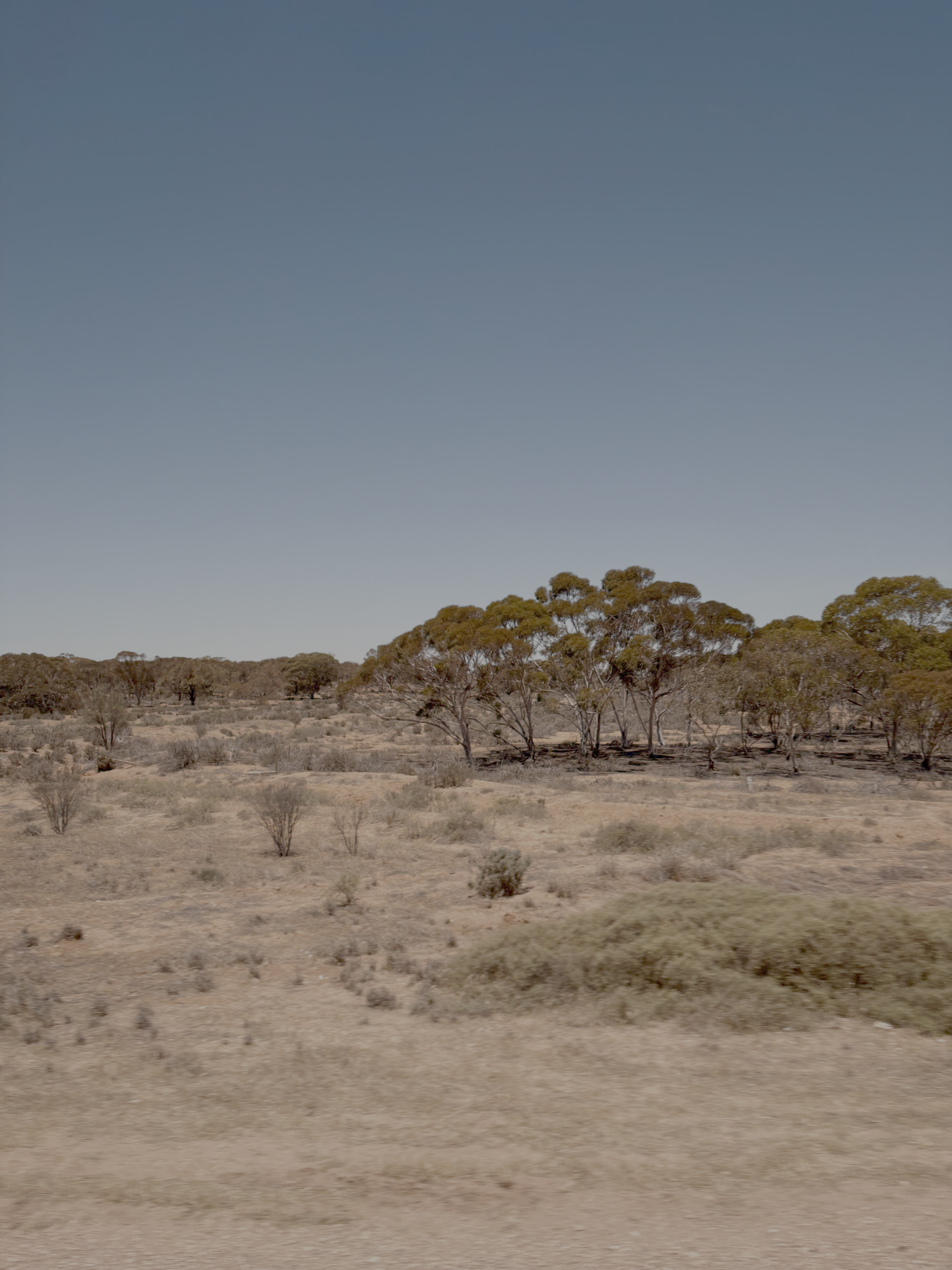
Bushland seen from the Mallee Highway

An area of South Australia immediately to the west of the Victorian Mallee region, also once covered with mallee scrub, is known as the Murray Mallee.

== Geography and climate ==
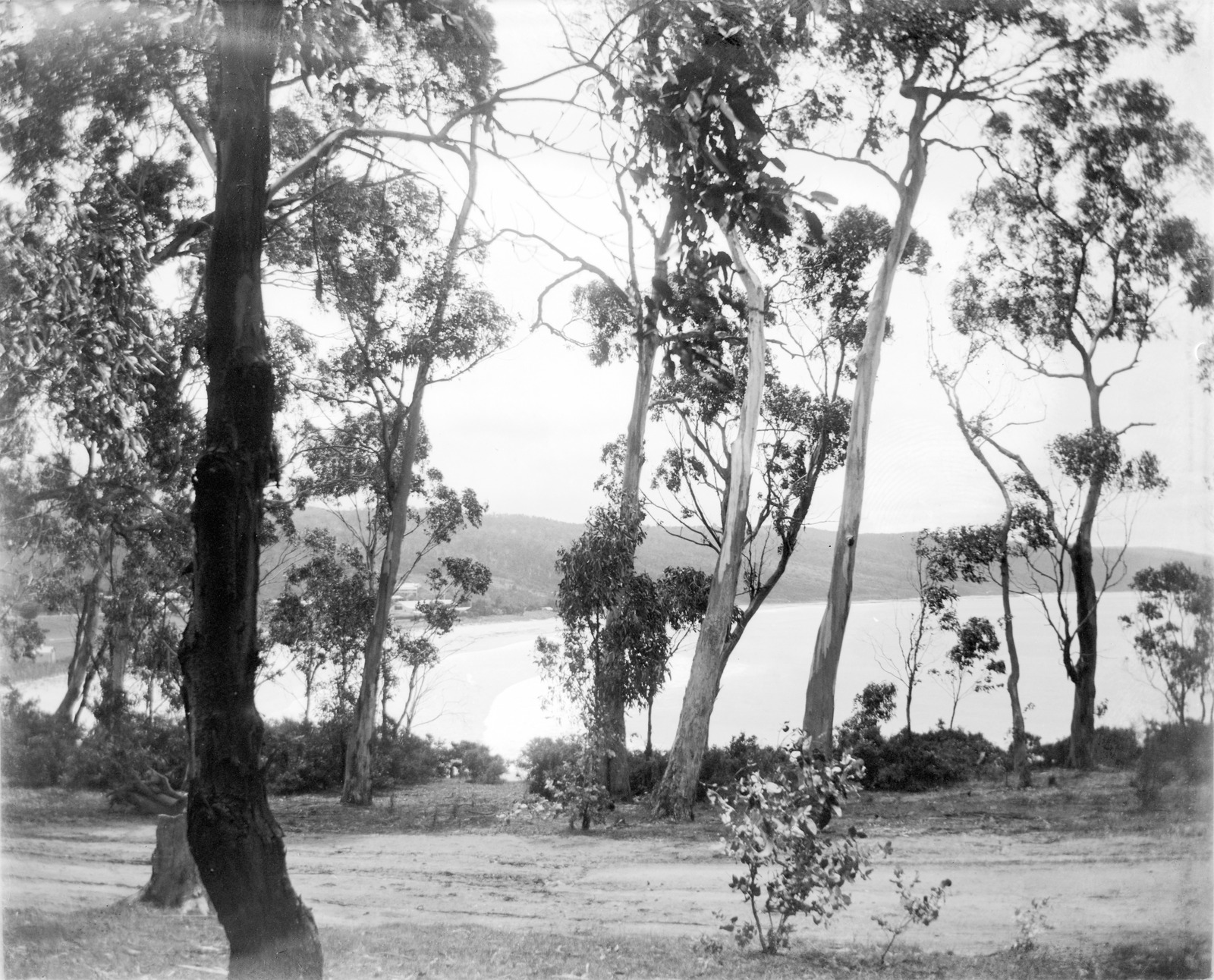
Bushland scrub

The Mallee is, for all practical purposes, completely flat and very low-lying: in fact, for long geological periods the whole region was inundated by the ocean. Most of the Mallee consists of sand dunes that have been deposited as a result of movement of sand from the interior of Australia during arid glacial periods of the Quaternary. The soils are generally very infertile and sandy: the better ones on more stabilised sand dunes in the east are slightly loamy and pink to light brown and have been able to support wheat and barley growing as a result of the development of superphosphate and other fertilisers. In the west, the soils are unconsolidated sands, much less alkaline than in the east, and not generally able to support any grain cropping.

The Mallee has no surface drainage: the native vegetation has so high a rooting density that the rainfall of most years is easily absorbed and the porous sandy soils mean that any excess in an exceptionally wet year will recharge groundwater supplies which tend to be highly saline. Flow from the Wimmera River to the south supplies Lake Hindmarsh and, very occasionally (in 1918, 1956 and 1975), overflows to the north. The Murray River is, thus, the only source of fresh water for the region and is consequently overburdened by intensive irrigation. As of 2019, 61% of the area utilizes drip irrigation.

The climate of the Mallee is the hottest and driest in Victoria owing to its inland location. Rainfall is usually only produced by the most vigorous frontal systems or by occasional penetration of tropical air in the summer. Average annual rainfall shows a well-defined north–south gradient: Mildura averages only 267.9 millimetres (10.55 in) per year but Hopetoun in the south receives around 370 mm (15 in). Variability, however, is quite high : in 1973 the Mallee averaged as much as 650 mm (26 in) but in 1982 only 115 mm (4.5 in). Temperatures in summer are generally very hot: during the Early 2009 southeastern Australia heat wave, Hopetoun reached 48.8 °C (119.8 °F) and the average maxima in January and February are 32.7 °C (90.9 °F). In July, maximum temperatures average 15.4 °C (59.7 °F), but minima average 4.4 °C (39.9 °F) and frosts are very common.

In his 1939 paper on the physiography of North-Western Victoria, E.S. Hills stated that: "the chief factors involved in the distinction between the Mallee and the country south and east of it are precipitation, evaporation, rock type, porosity of the superficial deposits, drainage away from high areas and supply of water from streams that rise in regions of higher rainfall."

Some areas of the Mallee have been named deserts. These are the Little Desert, Big Desert and Sunset Desert, all part of the Lowan Sands. In 1924, the Sun recorded that the Victorian Mallee, "twenty years ago, was included in the Great Australian Desert, and now carries a fairly close population of wheat farmers."

== Population ==
At the 2011 census, the Mallee had a population of 81,544, most of which live close to the Murray River in the district's two cities, Mildura and Swan Hill. These and other settlements within the municipalities based on these centres contain over two-thirds of the region's population. Ouyen and Murrayville are the main settlements of the central Mallee, while Kerang, Cohuna, Hopetoun and Birchip are the major towns in the south.

Mallee district LGA populations
Local government area	Area		Population (2011 census)	Source(s)
Local government area	km^{2}	sq mi	Population (2011 census)	Source(s)
Shire of Buloke ^{1}	8,004	3,090	6,384	
Shire of Gannawarra	3,732	1,441	10,366	
Rural City of Mildura	22,330	8,620	50,979	
Rural City of Swan Hill	6,117	2,362	20,449	
Totals	40,183	15,515	88,178	

^1 The north of the Shire of Buloke (around Birchip) is in the southern Mallee, while the south is in the Wimmera. Similarly, the north of Yarriambiack (around Hopetoun) is also typically considered part of the Mallee, while the south is in the Wimmera. The two shires were each formed around highways rather than the nature of their native vegetation and historic identity.

== Economic development ==
The Mallee is a primarily agricultural region: apart from possible mineral sands in the west and salt from certain ephemeral lakes there are no mineral deposits of value and industry is generally on a small scale and confined to food processing. Wheat and barley are widely grown on the less infertile soils in the southeast of the region, but fertilizers, especially superphosphate are essential for success and yields only a quarter of those in most of Europe or North America - in drought years, they can be as little as one twentieth of European wheat yields.

Fruit growing along the Murray River exceeds grain crops as the Mallee's major source of revenue. Oranges and grapes are particularly important and the region produces a large part of Victoria's wine though most of it is inexpensive cask wines. Dairying on irrigated pastures is important in the south of the region, but is threatened by its high water demand and the extreme scarcity of water in the Murray-Darling Basin.

Tourism is also significant industry. Mildura and Swan Hill contain a number of tourism focused businesses, including a number of specially built attractions and festivals. The Murray itself is also a major attraction, many people coming to the district for fishing and to stay on houseboats. The many Mallee national parks - Wyperfeld, Hattah-Kulkyne and Murray Sunset National Parks, wilderness parks, state forests, and other parks over the river are also major drawcards.

== Associated groups ==
The Wergaia people are an Aboriginal Australian group in the Wimmera and Mallee regions. The people were also known as the Maligundidj (in the Wotjobaluk language) which means the people belonging to the Mali (mallee) bushland, which covers part of their territory. This name has also been recorded as Malleegunditch.

== Region definitions ==
In the context of the Interim Biogeographic Regionalisation for Australia, the Mallee is spread over parts of both the Murray Darling Depression and Riverina bioregions.

The Mallee is one of the nine districts in Victoria used for weather forecasting by the Australian Bureau of Meteorology.

The Victorian Department of Environment and Primary Industries defines the district as a 39,300-square-kilometre (15,200 sq mi) region for agricultural production purposes encompassing the Buloke, Gannawarra, Mildura City and Swan Hill City local government areas.

Another common definition is that the Mallee is the part of Victoria dependent on Mildura and Swan Hill.

The Victoria State Government has historically had many departmental regions combining the Mallee with the greater Bendigo area, the current one being named the "Loddon Mallee" region. This region includes the Loddon River catchment and adjacent areas as well as the Mallee. This region is used by all state government departments, and often there is a central body for the region located in Bendigo. In 2005, there were attempts to push for a separate region in north-west Victoria in the belief that this would deliver more services to the district.

For tourism purposes, the term Wimmera Mallee is used to describe the Wimmera district and a small part of the Mallee that is relatively close to Horsham. A separate tourism district known as Mildura Swan Hill covers the rural cities of Mildura and Swan Hill. The term Wimmera Mallee has also been used by the federal member for Mallee to describe their electorate, as the electorate covers both regions more-or-less in their entirety.

The Mallee is sometimes referred to as an economic region, of the Australian state of Victoria. The district is located entirely within the Victorian government's "Loddon Mallee region".

People in the central Mallee sometimes believe that "the Mallee" only includes the dryland farming portion of the region.

== See also ==
- Geography of Victoria
- Mallee Boy
- Millewa
- Regions of Victoria
- Sunraysia
- Great Australian Desert
