= Wyperfeld National Park =

National park in Victoria, Australia

- IUCN category II (national park)
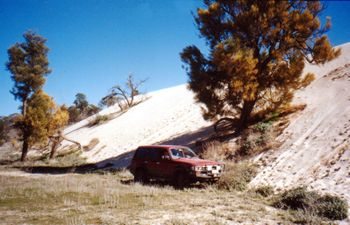
- "Snowdrift" sandhill on otherwise flat land in Wyperfeld National Park, 2001.

- Location within Victoria
- Location: Victoria
- Nearest city: Hopetoun
- Coordinates: 35°23′21″S 141°52′37″E
- Area: 3,570 km^{2} (1,380 sq mi)
- Established: 1921
- Governing body: Parks Victoria
- Website: Official website

The Wyperfeld National Park is the third-largest national park in Victoria, Australia, located in the Mallee district, approximately 450 kilometres (280 mi) north-west of Melbourne. The national park was declared in 1921 and has been expanded significantly since, to protect 357,017 hectares (882,210 acres) of mallee, woodland, and heathland. Along with the Hattah-Kulkyne National Park, Murray-Sunset National Park, Lake Albacutya Park and Murray-Kulkyne Park, Wyperfeld National Park is managed as part of the Victorian Mallee Parks.

== History ==
Like most of north-western Victoria, Wyperfeld was a shallow sea from about 25 million years ago until fairly recent times. The current landforms took shape as the sea gradually retreated from 40,000 to 15,000 years ago, leaving a vast expanse of sandy sediment which formed into sand dunes as it dried.

Before European settlement, a network of ephemeral lakes in the area filled and emptied, on average, about every 20 years, typically remaining dry for about half that period. More recently, agricultural irrigation and drainage projects in the surrounding areas have cut off a significant part of Wyperfeld's water supply. Consequently, the lakes have not been completely filled since 1975, and had drained again just two years later.

== Environment ==
In good years, the Wimmera River fills Lake Hindmarsh to the south of the park, which overflows along Outlet Creek and then fills Lake Albacutya to the immediate south of the park. Given sufficient rain in the catchment, the water flows further north into Wyperfeld itself, forming a series of smaller lakes, which support rich floral and faunal communities based around black box and river red gum. Despite downstream flooding in 2011, the park has seen no inflow of water for many years.

The reserve is part of the Wyperfeld, Big Desert and Ngarkat Important Bird Area, identified as such by BirdLife International because of its importance for the conservation of malleefowl and other species of mallee birds.

== See also ==
- Protected areas of Victoria
- List of national parks of Australia
