= William John Kennedy =

Australian activist

Uncle Jack Kennedy

William "Uncle" John Kennedy (23 March 1919 – 6 September 2005) was a lifelong activist for the rights of Australian Aboriginal people, a Wotjobaluk clan elder of the people who spoke the Wergaia language in the Wimmera region of western Victoria, Australia. He was born on the banks of the Wimmera River, not far from the Ebenezer Mission. He was the great grandson of Dick-a-Dick, a member of the first Australian cricket team to tour England in 1867–68.

He served with the Australian Army in the Syrian Campaign and North Africa and later in the Pacific during World War II, and was awarded the Australian Service Medal and the English Defence Medal for this service.

In 2003 he was named Male Elder of the Year at the National Aborigines' Day Observance Committee (NAIDOC) Week Awards.

In the historic determination of native title in the Wimmera handed down on 13 December 2005, just 3 months after Kennedy's death, Justice Ron Merkel said of Kennedy, as reported by The Age newspaper:

he had achieved 'what the elders expected of him' by, as was stated in his eulogy, 'fighting for this little piece of country for his ancestors and future generations'," Merkel said. "However, as a result of that fight, Uncle Jack Kennedy and his supporters have demonstrated something of even greater importance, namely, that the tide of history has not washed away all entitlements to native title in the south-eastern part of Australia.

In his reasons for judgement Merkel directly quoted Kennedy twice:

If we follow Bunjil's law and look after the country then the country will look after us. ... All the rules we have come from Bunjil. I must pass on Bunjil’s law so it continues.

and

I am looking forward to getting some of my country back before I die so I can die knowing I have done what the elders expected of me. The Beal trees are dying at Lake Albacutya because they are not getting enough water. If we look after the river properly it will run clear again, run all the way to the Teardrop Lakes. If the Wotjobaluk continue to follow Bunjil then things will go on as the old people would want.
