= Yarriambiack Creek =

Yarriambiack
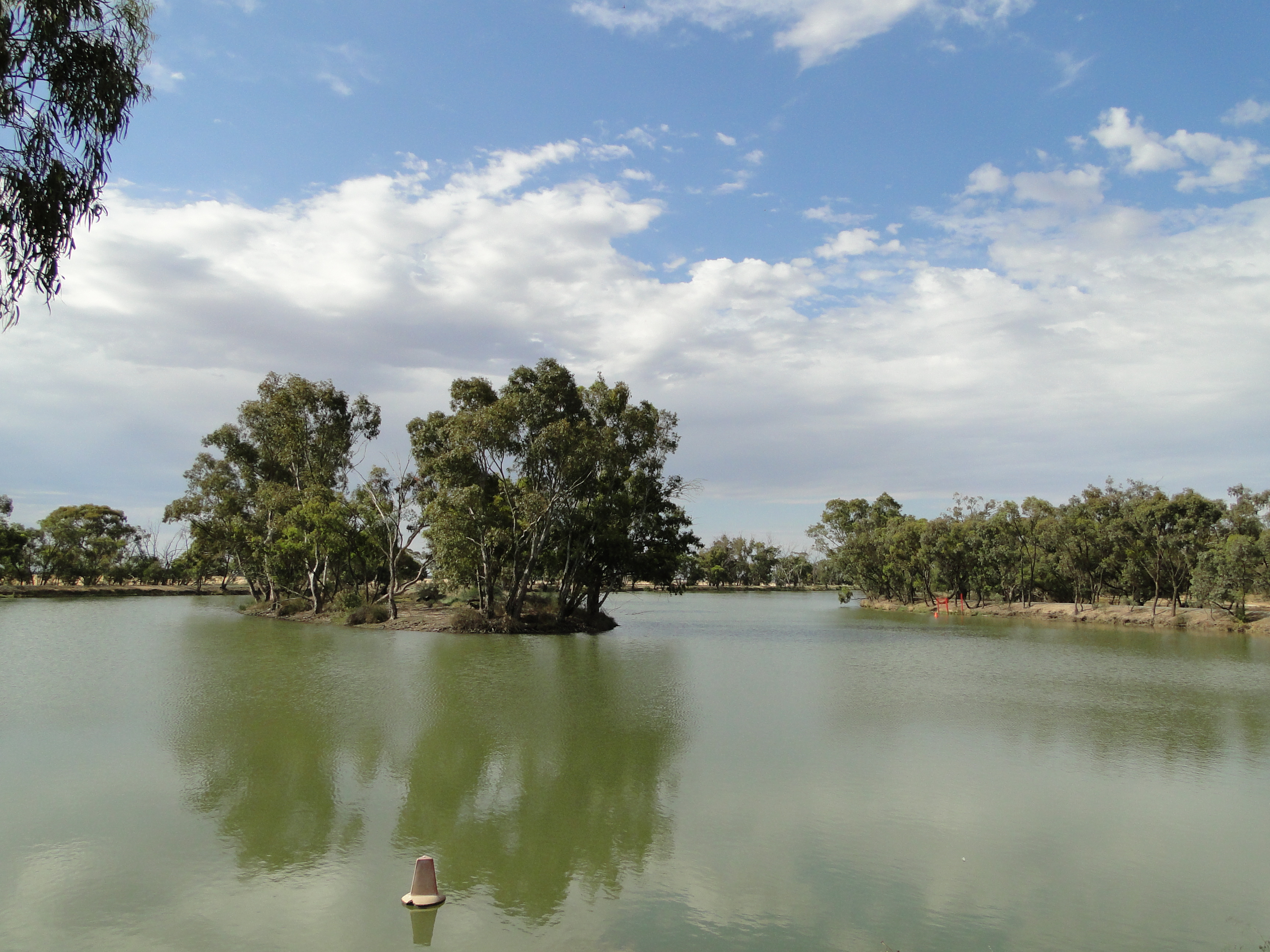
- Yarriambiack Creek at Brim

- Location of the Yarriambiack Creek mouth in Victoria

Location
- Country: Australia
- State: Victoria
- Region: Murray Darling Depression (IBRA), Wimmera
- LGAs: Horsham, Yarriambiack
- Towns: Warracknabeal, Brim, Beulah

Physical characteristics
- Source: Great Dividing Range
- 2nd source: Wimmera River
  - location: near Drung Drung, east of Horsham
  - coordinates: 36°42′26.7″S 142°24′43.9″E
  - elevation: 147 m (482 ft)
- Mouth: Lake Coorong
  - location: east of Hopetoun
  - coordinates: 35°44′29.6″S 142°23′6.8″E
  - elevation: 76 m (249 ft)
- Length: 141 km (88 mi)

Basin features
- River system: Wimmera catchment

The Yarriambiack Creek, an inland intermittent watercourse of the Wimmera catchment, is located in the Wimmera region of the Australian state of Victoria. Rising on the northern slopes of the Great Dividing Range, the Yarriambiack Creek flows generally north and drains into Lake Coorong, one of a series of ephemeral lakes, northeast of Hopetoun.

== Name ==
The name of the creek is thought to derive from Jarambuik, the name of a sub-group of the indigenous Wotjobaluk people, also once spelt Yarriambiac, Yarramberger and Yarrambeak.

== Location and features ==
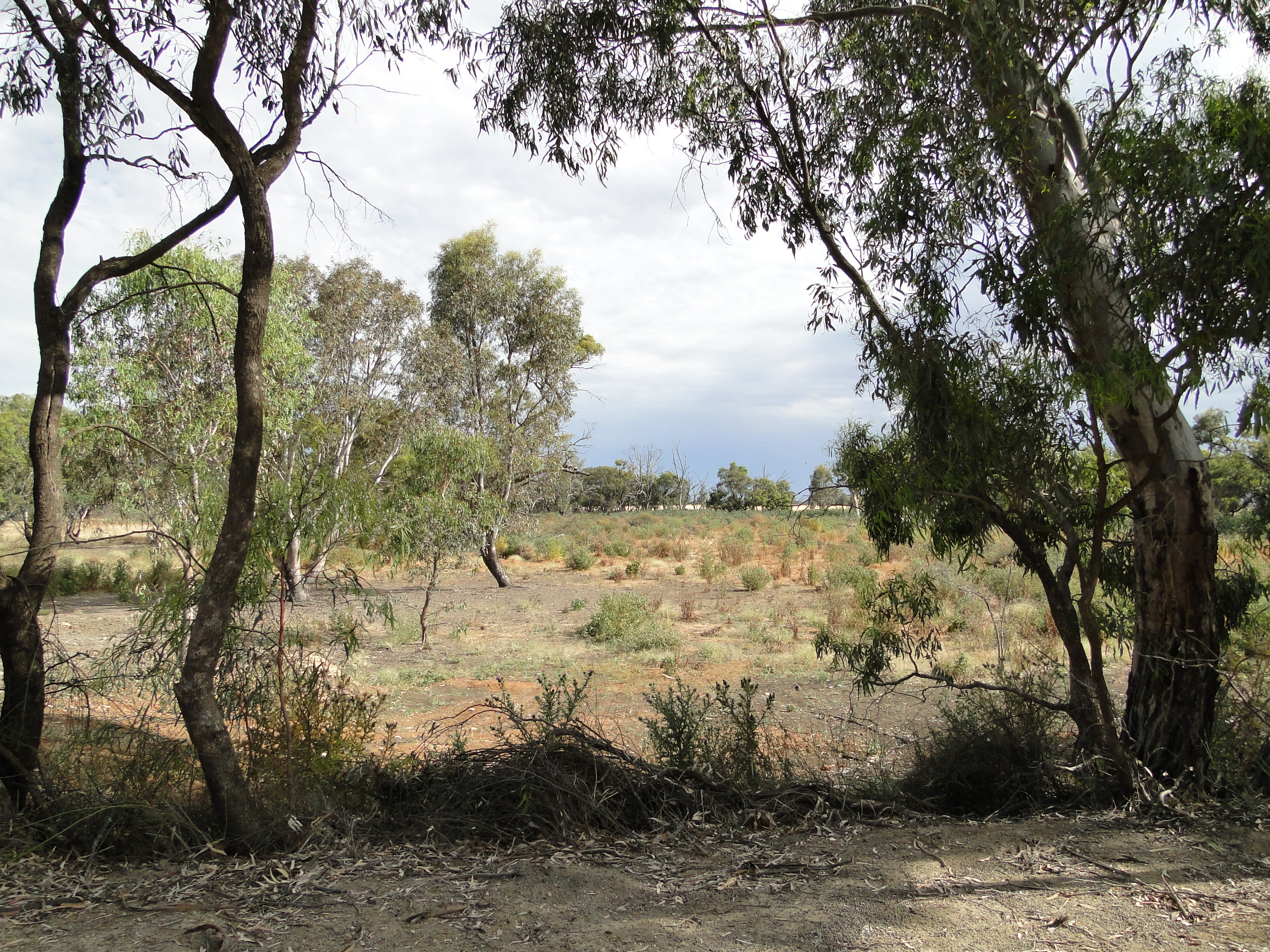
Dry creek bed at Brim, 2012

The Yarriambiack Creek is a distributary of the Wimmera River. It leaves the river near Drung Drung, approximately 20 kilometres (12 mi) east of Horsham.

The watercourse flows northwards through Warracknabeal and empties into Lake Coorong just east of Hopetoun. The watercourse flow is intermittent and depends almost entirely on the level of the Wimmera River. After not flowing for most of the previous 15 years, it flooded in September 2010 and January 2011. Water was released from the Wimmera River in 2012, flowed through the creek and ended in Warracknabeal. There are a number of weirs built along the creek to hold water. The Yarriambiack Creek descends 71 metres (233 ft) over its 141-kilometre (88 mi) course.

At Warracknabeal, Brim, Beulah and Hopetoun there are picnic spots, camping areas, gardens and walking trails.

The creek is crossed by the Henty Highway at multiple points between Warracknabeal and Hopetoun.

== See also ==
- List of rivers of Australia § Victoria
