= Mallee region =

Mallee Region may refer to:

- Mallee (biogeographic region), a biogeographic region in southern Western Australia
- The Mallee, a region in northwest Victoria, Australia
