= Wotjobaluk people =

Aboriginal Australian people of the Wimmera region of Victoria

Wotjobaluk is an ethnonym used by A. W. Howitt to denote a group of Aboriginal Australian people now known as the Wudjubalug.. The term is used also specifically to refer to a particular subgroup, closely related to the Wergaia people of the state of Victoria.

== Language ==
Wotjobaluk was a dialect of Wergaia. R. H. Mathews supplied a brief analysis of the closely related Djadjala (Tyattyalla) as spoken around Albacutya He stated that it was characterised by four numbers: the singular, the dual, trial, and plural. There were, in addition, two forms of the trial number for the 1st person, depending on whether the person addressed was included or excluded. Thus one obtains: wutju (a man); "wutju-buliñ" (two men); wutju-kullik (three men); wutju-getyaul (several men).

In mid-2021 a language revival project started up at the Wotjobaluk Knowledge Place, established in December 2020 at Dimboola. A Wergaia language program would run over 20 weeks.

== Country ==
Wotjobaluk territory took in some 12,000 square kilometres (4,800 mi^{2}) inclusive of the Wimmera River, Outlet Creek and the two eutrophic lakes, Hindmarsh and Albacutya. Their southern borders down ran to Dimboola, Kaniva, and Servicetown. Their western frontier lay beyond Yanac, and to the east, as far as Warracknabeal and Lake Korong. Their northern horizon reached Pine Plains.

== Social organisation ==
The Wotjobaluk were divided into 11 bands or clans:

1. Lail-buil between Pine Plains and the River Murray
2. Jakelbalak between Pine Plains and Lake Albacutya
3. Kromelak at Lake Albacutya
4. Wanmung Wanmungkur at Lake Hindmarsh
5. Kapuu-kapunbara on the River Wimmera, towards Lake Hindmarsh
6. Duwinbarap west of River Wimmera
7. Jackalbarap west of Duwinbarap
8. Jarambiuk at Yarriambiack Creek (so called)
9. Whitewurudiuk, east of Yarriambiack Creek
10. Kerabialbarap south of Mount Arapiles
11. Murra-murra-barap in the Grampians

According to A. W. Howitt, the Wotjobaluk were divided into two moieties, the "white cockatoo" (Gartchukas) and the "black snake" (Wullernunt).

== Culture ==
As in many other Aboriginal cultures, before they had completed their full initiation rites, young Wotjobaluk males lay under a strict ban against eating a number of foods, such as the flesh of kangaroos or the pademelon. (Note: 'In Australia the boys and girls of the Lower Murray tribes thought that if before initiation they ate emu, wild duck, swans, geese, or black duck, or the eggs of any of these birds, their hair would become premature and their muscles would shrink. Wotjobaluk boys are forbidden to eat of the kangaroo or the pademelon on penalty of breaking out all over with eruption.')

According to what Wotjobaluk hunters told Adolf Hartmann of their hunting lore, kangaroos had acute hearing, and could twig the presence of a predator at 150 yards simply by hearing the noise of ankle-bones cracking. Older kangaroos were apt to cast their young from their marsupial pouch if chased by dingos, to distract the dogs from their main prey.

== Cultural centre ==
The Wotjobaluk Knowledge Place, apart from teaching language (see above), displays artworks, conducts workshops, and is a centre for social get-togethers.

== Alternative names ==
- Buibatjali (dialect name), buibatyalli
- Gnallbagootchyourl
- Gourrbaluk (Gour =Lake Hindmarsh, name used by Wemba-Wemba)
- Kurm-me-lak (horde name = Gromiluk)
- Malikunditj (northern tribal exonym)
- Malleegunditch
- Ngalbagutja denoting Lake Albucutya, a Wemba-Wemba exonym used of northern hordes of the Wotjobaluk)
- Tjatijala (regional name west of Lake Hindmarsh)
- Tyattyalla, Djadjala
- Wattyabullak
- Wimmera tribe
- Woitu-bullar (plural of man as used in Barababaraba tribe)
- Wotjo-ba-laiuruk (lit. "men and women")
- Woychibirik (name for man = wotjo])
- Wuttyabullak, Wuttyuballeak

== Some words ==
- dhallung (male or buck kangaroo)
- gal (dog)
- kulkun (a boy)
- laiaruk (a woman)
- lanangurk (a girl).
- mindyun (a kangaroo)
- muty (doer or female kangaroo)
- winya nyua (Who is there?)
- wotjo (a man)

== Sources ==
- "Wergaia (S17)". aiatsis.
- "Wotjobaluk (S88)". aiatsis.
- Bride, Thomas Francis, ed. (1898). Letters from Victorian Pioneers (PDF). Melbourne: Robert S Brain Government Printer.
- Curr, Edward Micklethwaite (1887). Curr, Edward Micklethwaite (ed.). The Australian race: its origin, languages, customs, place of landing in Australia and the routes by which it spread itself over the continent (PDF). Vol. 3. Melbourne: J. Ferres.
- Hartmann, Rev Adolf (1878). Smyth, Robert Brough (ed.). The Aborigines of Victoria: with notes relating to the habits of the natives of other parts of Australia and Tasmania (PDF). Vol. 1. Melbourne: J. Ferres, gov't printer. pp. 39, 249–251.
- Howitt, A. W. (1886). "On the Migrations of the Kurnai Ancestors". The Journal of the Anthropological Institute of Great Britain and Ireland. 15: 409–422. JSTOR 2841818.
- Howitt, Alfred William (1904). The native tribes of south-east Australia. Macmillan.
- Kelso, Andrew (3 June 2021). "Dimboola to 'revive' Wergaia language, in Victorian first". ABC News.
- Mathews, R. H. (1902). "Aboriginal languages of Victoria". Proceedings of the Royal Society of New South Wales. 36: 71–106.
- Parker, K. Langloh (1905). The Euahlayi tribe; a study of aboriginal life in Australia (PDF). A. Constable & Co.
- Parsons, Elsie Clews (January–March 1915). "Links between Religion and Morality in Early Culture". American Anthropologist. 17 (1): 41–57. JSTOR 660146.
- Smyth, Robert Brough (1878). The Aborigines of Victoria: with notes relating to the habits of the natives of other parts of Australia and Tasmania (PDF). Vol. 1. Melbourne: J. Ferres, gov't printer.
- Stone, A. C. (1911). "Aborigines of Lake Boga". Proceedings of the Royal Society of Victoria. 23: 433–468 – via BHL.
- Tindale, Norman Barnett (1974). "Wotjobaluk (VIC)". Aboriginal Tribes of Australia: Their Terrain, Environmental Controls, Distribution, Limits, and Proper Names. Australian National University Press. ISBN 978-0-708-10741-6. Archived from the original on 6 May 2021.
