= Mackenzie River (Victoria) =

Mackenzie McKenzie (incorrectly)
- Location of the Mackenzie River mouth in Victoria
- Native name: Bun-nah; Bunudj (Jardwadjali)

Location
- Country: Australia
- State: Victoria
- Region: Murray Darling Depression (IBRA), Grampians
- Local government areas: Northern Grampians, Yarriambiack, Horsham
- Towns: Wartook, Rosebrook

Physical characteristics
- Source: Grampian Range, Great Dividing Range
  - location: Grampians National Park
  - coordinates: 37°6′46.6″S 142°24′21.8″E
  - elevation: 323 m (1,060 ft)
- Mouth: confluence with the Wimmera River
  - location: southwest of Horsham
  - coordinates: 36°44′40″S 141°56′51″E
  - elevation: 131 m (430 ft)
- Length: 57 km (35 mi)

Basin features
- River system: Wimmera catchment
- Tributaries
  - right: Bungalally Creek
- National park: Grampians National Park

The Mackenzie River, an inland intermittent river of the Wimmera catchment, is located in the Grampians region of the Australian state of Victoria. Rising in the Grampians National Park, on the northern slopes of the Great Dividing Range, the Mackenzie River flows generally north by west and drains into the Wimmera River, southwest of Horsham.

== Course and features ==
The Mackenzie River rises on the northern slopes of the Great Dividing Range, and flows generally west by north, joined by one minor tributary, before reaching its mouth to flow into the Wimmera River at Haven, southwest of Horsham. The Mackenzie River descends 62 metres (203 ft) over its 57-kilometre (35 mi) course.

The river is crossed by the Henty Highway, south of Horsham.

== Etymology ==
In the local Aboriginal language the river is named Bun-nah, meaning "tea-tree scrub"; and in the Jardwadjali language, Bunud, meaning "mallee tree, tea-tree scrub".

== See also ==
- List of rivers of Victoria
