= Lake Coorong =

Eutrophic lake in Victoria, Australia

- Location in Victoria
- Location: Wimmera, Victoria
- Coordinates: 35°44′1.5″S 142°23′20.5″E
- Type: Eutrophic
- Primary inflows: Yarriambiack Creek
- Primary outflows: evaporation
- Basin countries: Australia
- Surface area: 100 ha (250 acres)

Lake Coorong is an eutrophic lake in the Wimmera region of western Victoria, Australia. The lake is located adjacent to the township of Hopetoun. After more than a decade of drought, in early 2011 the lake filled as a result of flooding in the region.

In the local Aboriginal Wergaia language, the river is named Yarak, with "Yarak" representing the lake and surrounding country; and also Gurrong with the word meaning "canoe".

== See also ==
- Lakes and other water bodies of Victoria
