= Elmhurst, Victoria =

Elmhurst Victoria
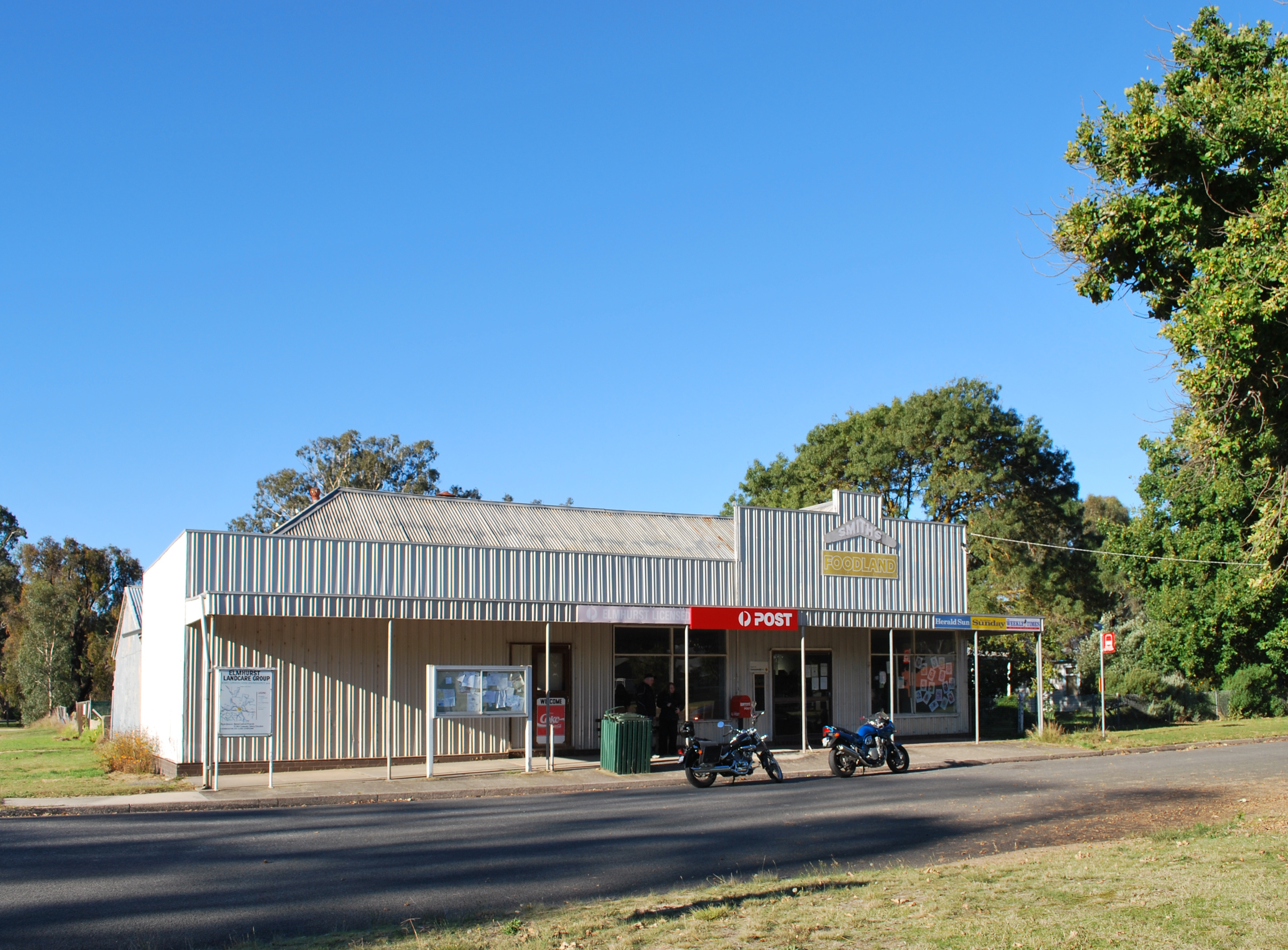
- General store

- Coordinates: 37°11′0″S 143°15′0″E
- Population: 185 (2021 census)
- Postcode(s): 3469
- Location: 191 km (119 mi) NW of Melbourne; 77 km (48 mi) NW of Ballarat; 35 km (22 mi) NE of Ararat; 28 km (17 mi) SW of Avoca
- LGA(s): Rural City of Ararat
- State electorate(s): Ripon
- Federal division(s): Mallee; Wannon

Elmhurst is a town in the Pyrenees region of western Victoria, Australia. The town is on the Pyrenees Highway between Eversley and Amphitheatre. Elmhurst is in the Rural City of Ararat local government area, 191 kilometres (119 mi) north-west of the state capital, Melbourne. The headwaters of the Wimmera River form near Elmhurst. At the 2021 census, Elmhurst had a population of 185.

Mount Cole and the Mount Buangor State Park are located south of Elmhurst.

The general store is now closed. Elmhurst has a small post office that is open limited hours Monday-Friday (9 am - 1 pm).

The Elmhurst Recreation Reserve (on Green st) has public toilets, a picnic area and a playground.

== Gallery ==
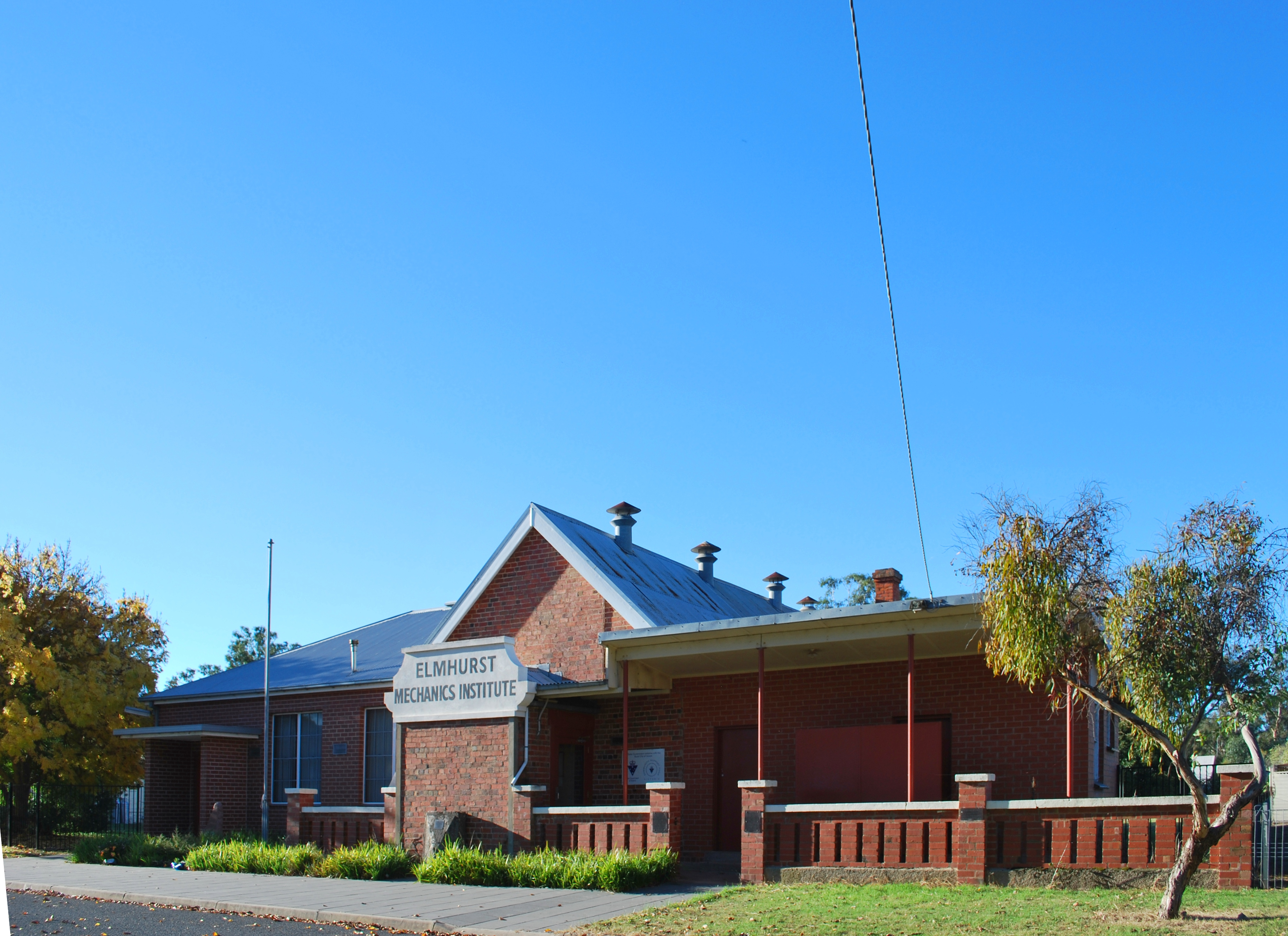
Elmhurst Mechanics Institute

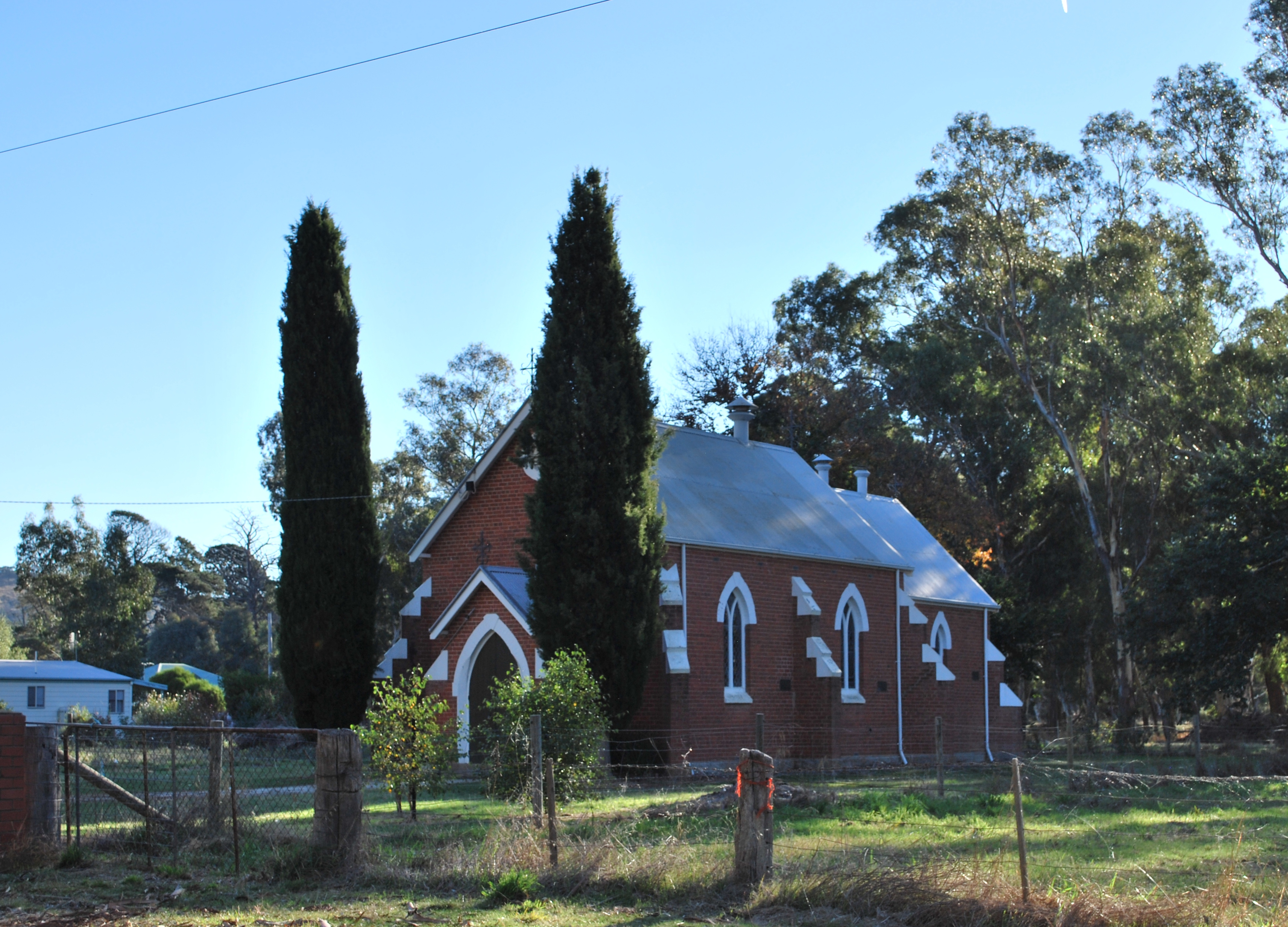
Anglican Church

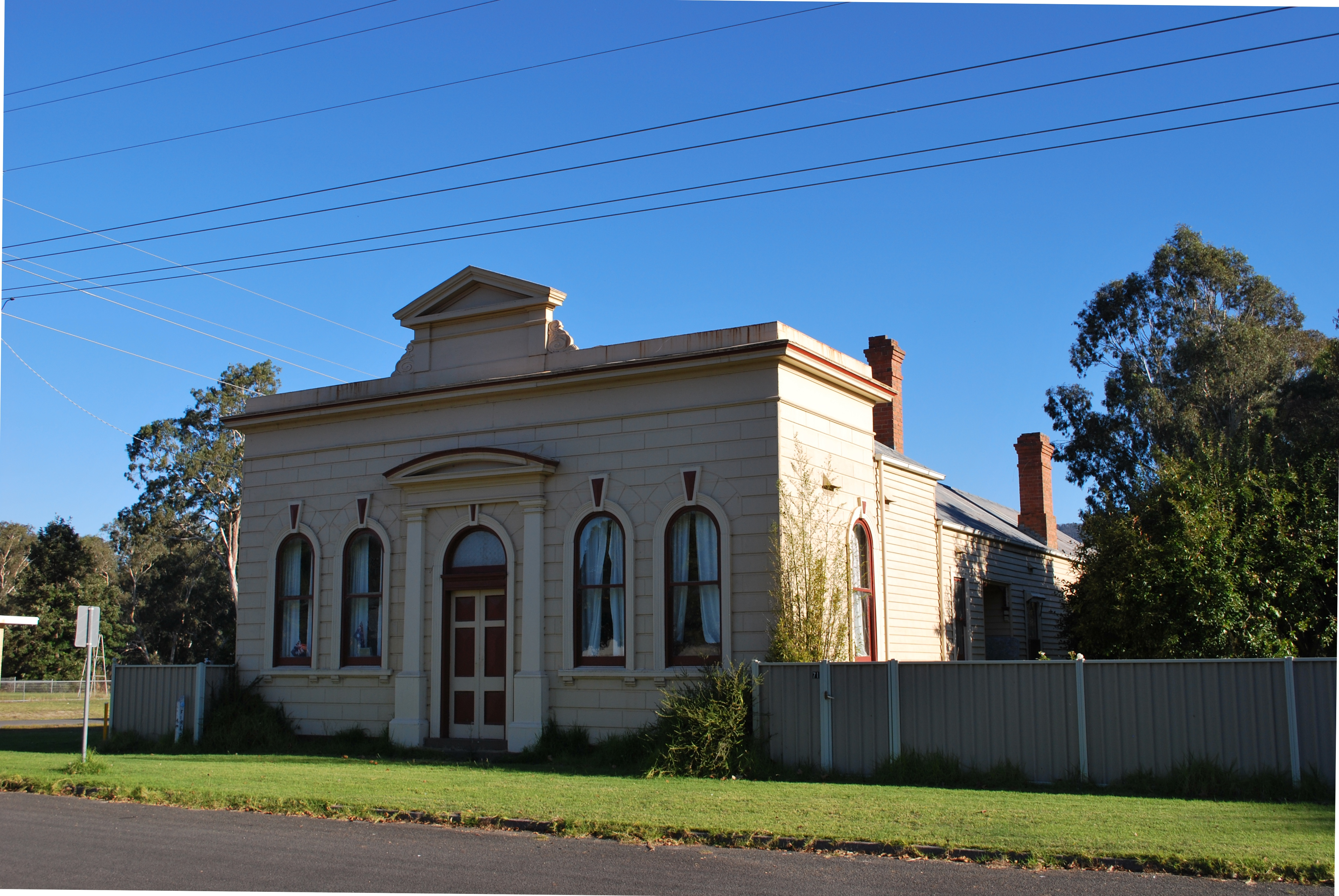
Bank Building

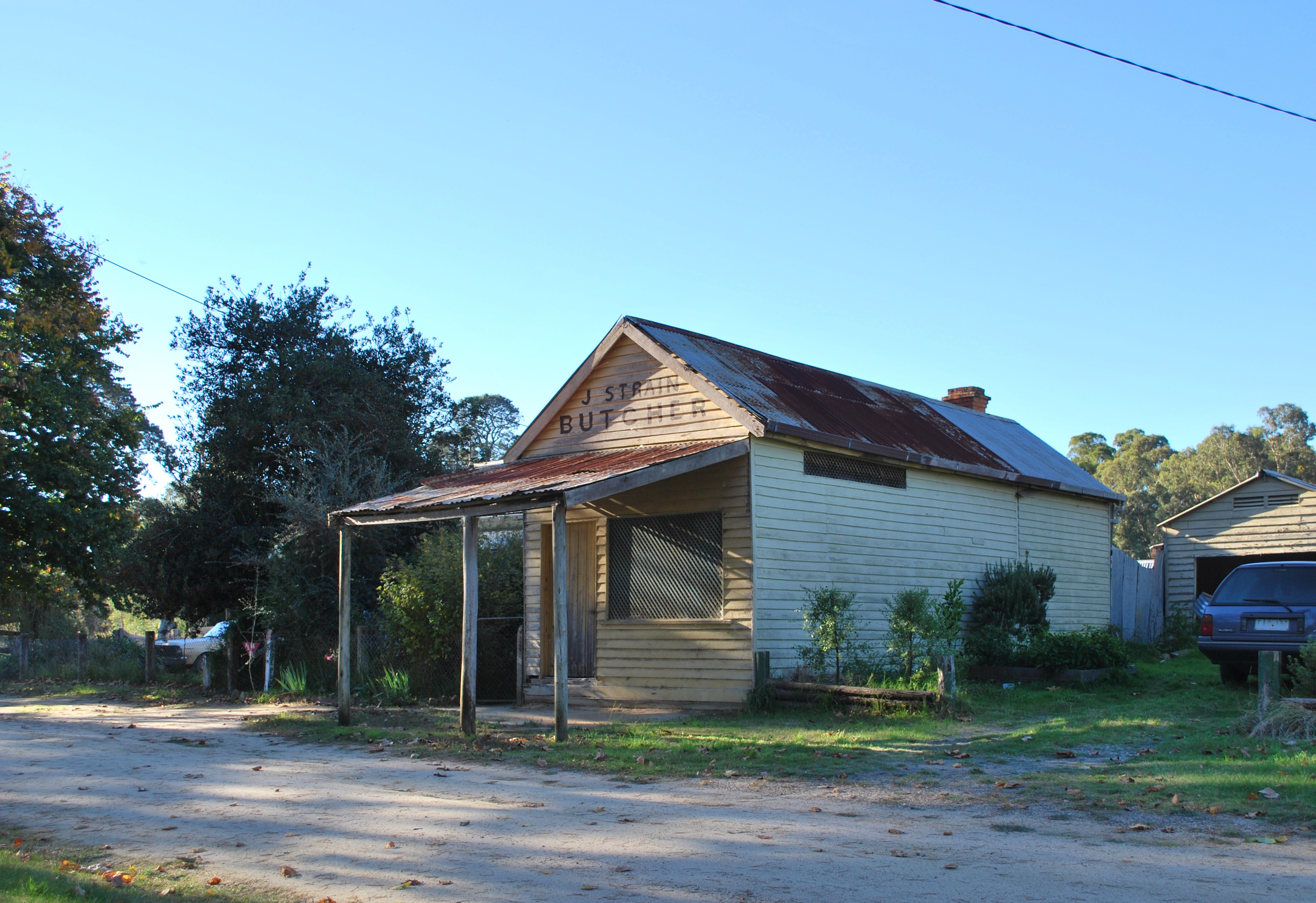
Butcher Shop

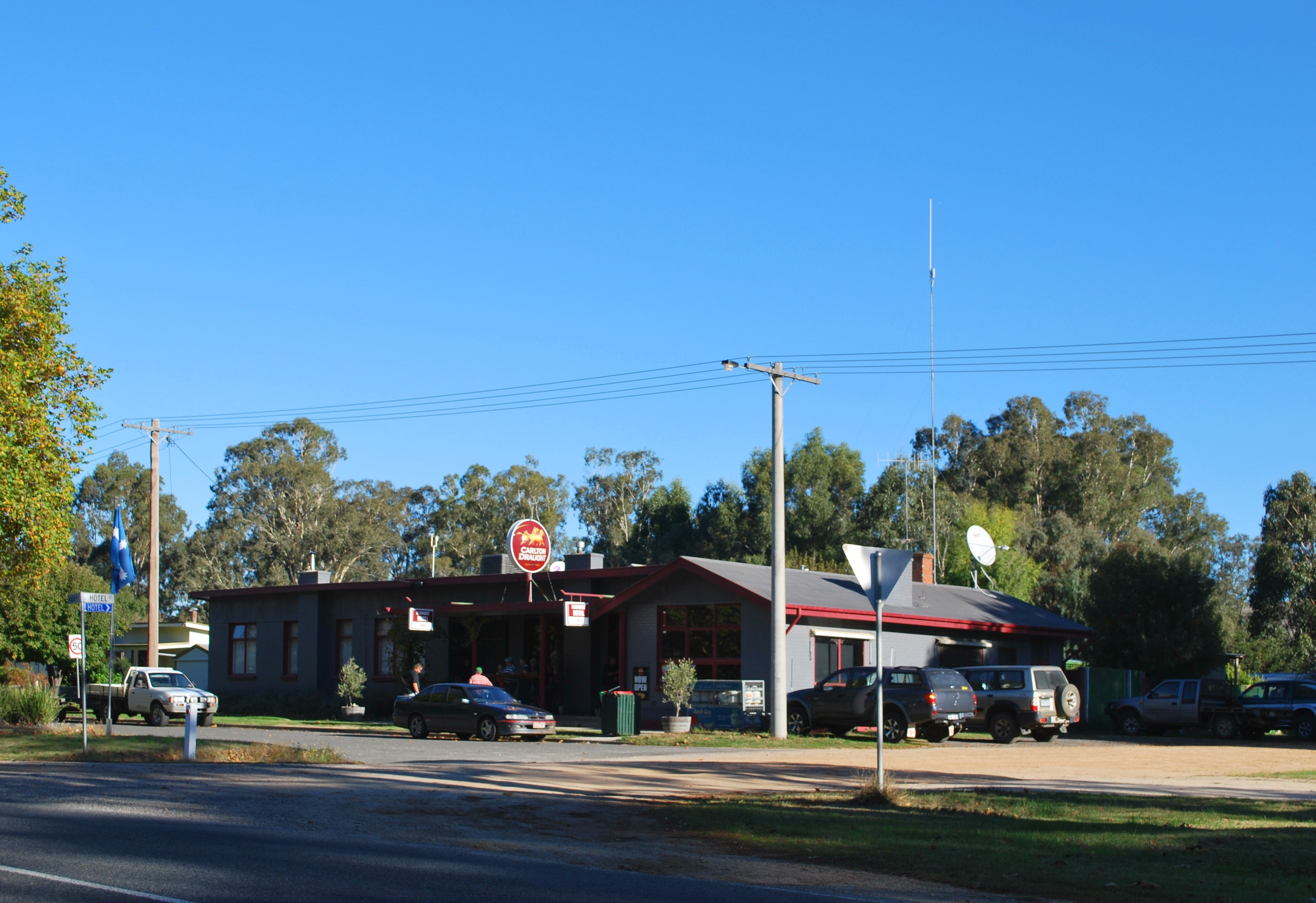
Elmhurst Hotel

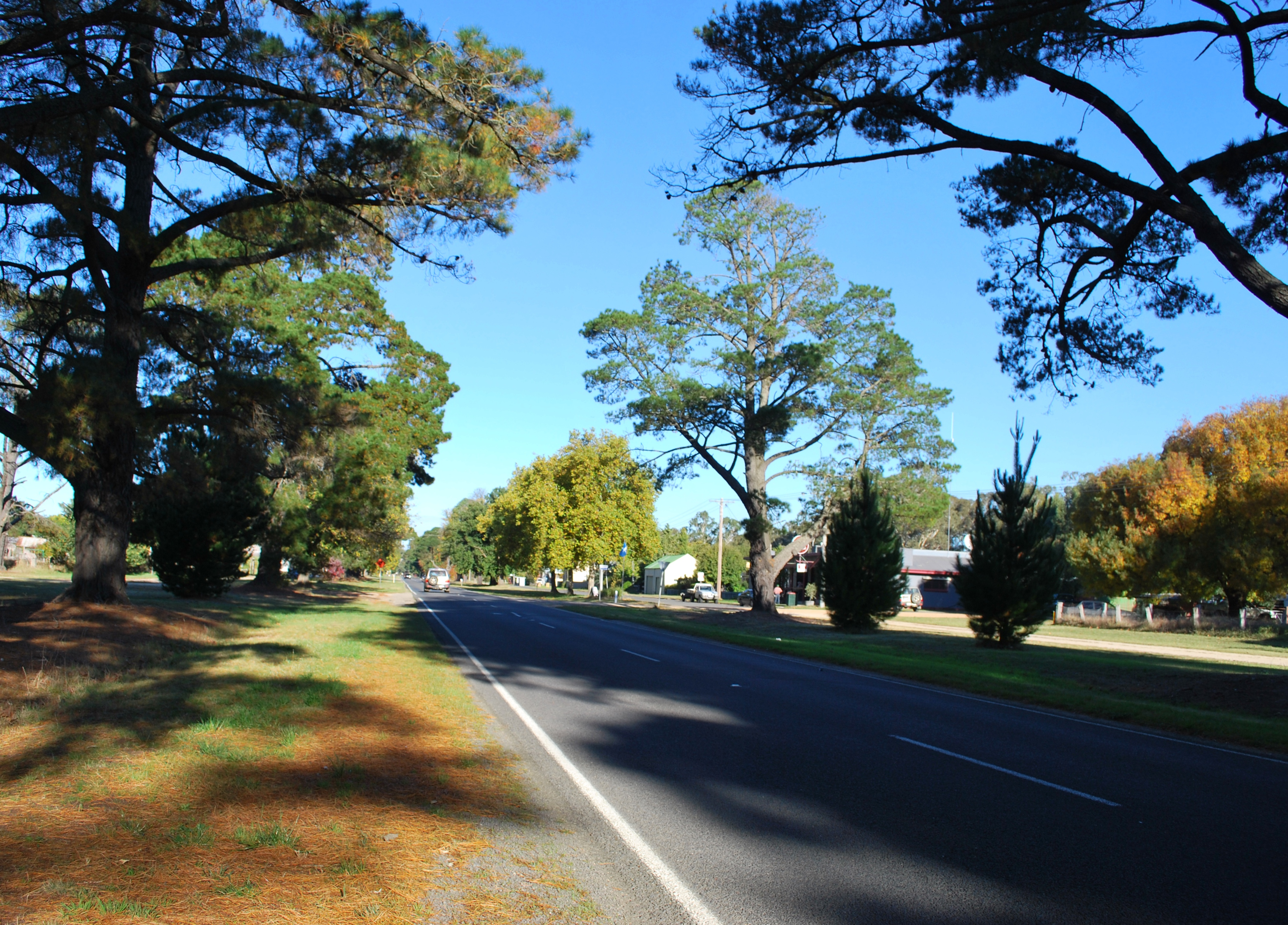
Elmhurst Pyrenees Highway

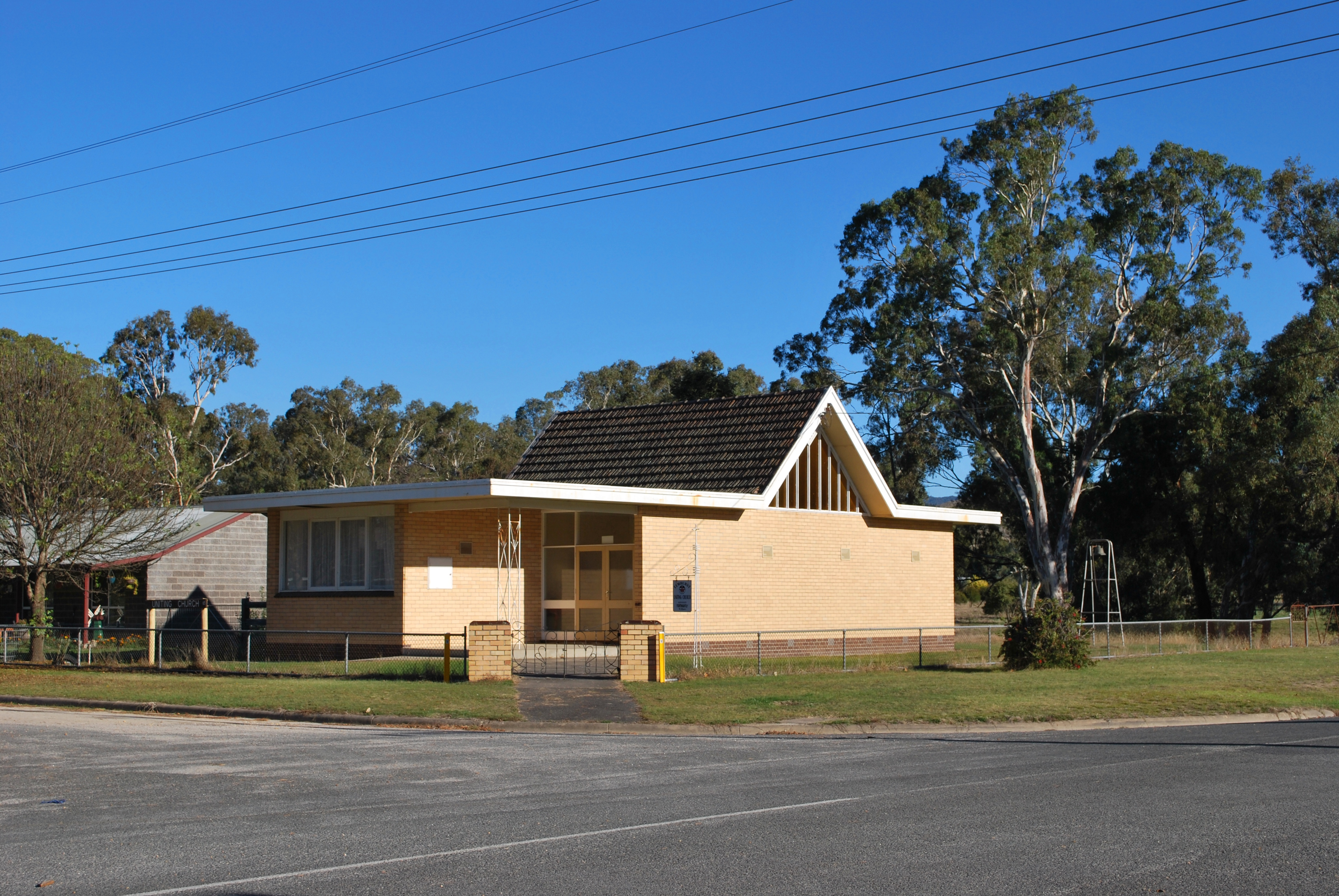
Uniting Church
