= Lake Albacutya =

Lake in Victoria, Australia

Lake Albacutya (Ngelbakutya)
- Location in Victoria
- Location: Albacutya, Victoria
- Coordinates: 35°45′21″S 141°58′28″E
- Type: Eutrophic
- Primary inflows: Outlet Creek
- Primary outflows: Outlet Creek (when full); evaporation
- Catchment area: 23,500 km^{2} (9,100 mi^{2})
- Basin countries: Australia
- Max. length: 13 km (8.1 mi)
- Max. width: 5 km (3.1 mi)
- Surface area: 55 km^{2} (21 mi^{2})
- Average depth: 8 m (26 ft)
- Max. depth: 8 m (26 ft)
- Water volume: 230 GL (5.1×10^{10} imp gal; 6.1×10^{10} US gal)

Ramsar Wetland
- Designated: 15 December 1982
- Reference no.: 270

Lake Albacutya (Wergaia: Ngelbakutya) is an ephemeral lake located in Albacutya within the Wimmera region of Victoria, Australia. It is one of a series of terminal lakes on the Wimmera River, which form the largest land-locked drainage system in Victoria. Lake Albacutya is designated as a wetland of international importance under the Ramsar Convention.

== Location and features ==
On the occasions that there is an overflow from Lake Hindmarsh to the south, water enters Outlet Creek, (Wergaia: Krumelak) which then feeds Lake Albacutya. When full, Lake Albacutya covers 5,500 ha (14,000 acres), is 8 m (26 ft) deep, and holds around 230 gigalitres (8.1×10^{9} cubic feet) of water.

The lake generally fills and empties on a 20-year cycle, the longest dry period on record being 27 years. In 2011 it was reported that the lake had not received any inflow for some years and remained dry throughout the wetter years of 2011–2012.

Being less saline than Lake Hindmarsh, Lake Albacutya supports a denser cover of vegetation during its dry phase.
