= Lake Hindmarsh =

Lake in Victoria, Australia

- Gour (Wemba Wemba)
- Location in Victoria
- Location: Wimmera, Victoria
- Coordinates: 36°03′41″S 141°54′47″E
- Type: Eutrophic
- Primary inflows: Wimmera River
- Primary outflows: Outlet Creek (When full), evaporation
- Catchment area: 23,500 km^{2} (9,100 mi^{2})
- Basin countries: Australia
- Max. length: 22 km (14 mi)
- Max. width: 7 km (4.3 mi)
- Surface area: 135 km^{2} (52 mi^{2})
- Average depth: 3.4 m (11 ft)
- Max. depth: 3.65 m (12.0 ft)
- Water volume: 378 GL (8.3×10^{10} imp gal; 1.00×10^{11} US gal)

Lake Hindmarsh, an ephemeral lake in the Wimmera region of western Victoria, Australia, is the state's largest natural freshwater lake. The nearest towns are Jeparit to the south and Rainbow to the north. After more than a decade of drought, in early 2011 the lake filled as a result of flooding in the region. The Wemba Wemba name of the lake is recorded as Gour or Koor.

== Geography ==
Lake Hindmarsh is the northernmost lake of the Wimmera River Terminal Wetlands, and receives water directly from the Wimmera River. When full, the lake covers 13,500 hectares (33,000 acres), is 3.4 metres (11 ft) deep and holds 378 gigalitres (8.3×10^{10} imp gal; 1.00×10^{11} US gal) of water. It is a wetland of national significance. On the rare occasions when Lake Hindmarsh overflows, water runs, via Outlet Creek (Wergaia: Krumelak), to the deeper Lake Albacutya (Wergaia: Ngelbakutya), which has been recognised under the Ramsar Convention as a wetland of international importance.

Flat and shallow, Lake Hindmarsh is subject to very high evaporation. When it is full, evaporation from the lake is around 140,000 megalitres (3.1×10^{10} imp gal; 3.7×10^{10} US gal) per year. With flows down the Wimmera River averaging only half of that, the lake rarely fills, but if it does, the water takes three to four years to evaporate entirely.

The lake was full during the wet years of the early to mid-1970s. It supported a commercial fishing industry and was a destination for tourism and water sports, with a water-skiing club having a membership of over 100. The lake filled again in 1996, but then received no further water from the Wimmera River, and had dried up by 2000. It remained dry for almost a decade.

In October 2009, water from the Wimmera River trickled into Lake Hindmarsh for the first time in thirteen years. The 2010 Victorian floods of September raised lake water levels higher and triggered a revival of birdlife. The January 2011 Victorian floods in the Wimmera catchment raised hopes that the lake would fill, and possibly overflow into the lakes to the north. However, Outlet Creek remained dry.

== Indigenous people ==
The area around the lake is the traditional country of the Gromiluk, a branch of the Wotjobaluk people. They speak the Wergaia language.

== Colonial history ==
Explorer Edward Eyre camped at Lake Hindmarsh in 1838 while searching for an overland route from Melbourne to Adelaide, and named the lake after the then governor of South Australia, John Hindmarsh. European pastoralists occupied land around the lake from 1845, and the Moravian Ebenezer Mission was established nearby in 1859.

== See also ==
- Lakes and other water bodies of Victoria
