= Wimmera River =

River in Victoria, Australia

Wimmera
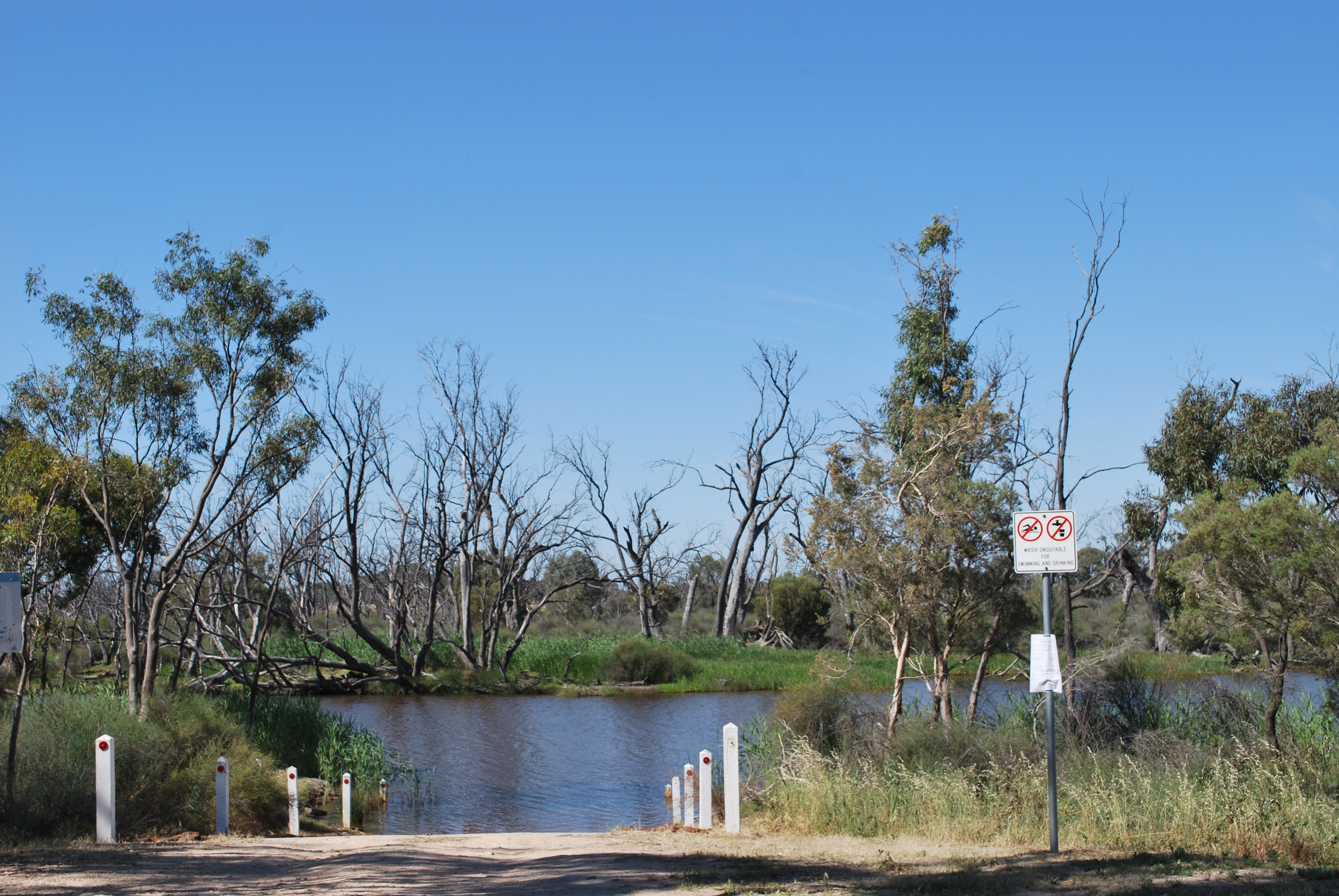
- The Wimmera River at Jeparit

- Location of the Wimmera River mouth in Victoria
- Native name: Walla-walla, Wamara, Bunnut, Culcatok, Barbarton, Billiwhin, Wudjum-biat, Bar, Barengi-djul, Yaigir, Wudiyedi, Barrh, Tarnorrer, Barkar, Guri-beb, Giridji-gal, Wadidirabul, Maripmunninnera

Location
- Country: Australia
- State: Victoria
- Region: Murray Darling Depression (IBRA), Wimmera
- Local government areas: Ararat, Northern Grampians, Yarriambiack, Horsham, Hindmarsh
- Towns: Elmhurst, Crowlands, Glenorchy, Horsham, Dimboola, Tarranyurk, Jeparit

Physical characteristics
- Source: Pyrenees, Great Dividing Range
  - location: below Ben Nevis, in a state forestry area south of Elmhurst
  - coordinates: 37°16′29″S 143°15′00″E
  - elevation: 299 m (981 ft)
- Mouth: Lake Hindmarsh, Lake Albacutya
  - location: Outlook Creek, near Jeparit
  - coordinates: 36°06′42″S 141°56′51″E
  - elevation: 79 m (259 ft)
- Length: 278 km (173 mi)
- Basin size: 24,011 km^{2} (9,271 sq mi)
- Discharge
  - average: 13 m^{3}/s (460 cu ft/s)

Basin features
- River system: Wimmera catchment
- Tributaries
  - left: Mount Cole Creek, Six Mile Creek (Wimmera), Seven Mile Creek (Wimmera), Concongella Creek, Sheepwash Creek, Mount William Creek, Mackenzie River, Burnt Creek, Darragan Creek, Norton Creek
  - right: Glenpatrick Creek, Glenlofty Creek, Spring Creek (Wimmera), Heifer Station Creek
- National parks: Wyperfeld National Park, Little Desert National Park

The Wimmera River, an inland intermittent river of the Wimmera catchment, is located in the Grampians and Wimmera regions of the Australian state of Victoria. Rising in the Pyrenees, on the northern slopes of the Great Dividing Range, the Wimmera River flows generally north by west and drains into Lake Hindmarsh and Lake Albacutya, a series of ephemeral lakes that, whilst they do not directly empty into a defined watercourse, form part of the Murray River catchment of the Murray-Darling basin.

== Course and features ==
The Wimmera River rises in the Great Dividing Range below Elmhurst, between Ararat and Avoca, and flows generally north and west, through Glenorchy, Horsham, Dimboola and Jeparit, also forming the eastern boundary of the Little Desert National Park. It is joined by fourteen minor tributaries, including the Mackenzie River, before reaching its mouth at Lake Hindmarsh, near Jeparit. The river descends 220 metres (720 ft) over its 278-kilometre (173 mi) course.

On the rare occasions that Lake Hindmarsh overflows, water flows via Outlet Creek to Lake Albacutya. In most years the flow of the river does not reach those terminal lakes, and the watercourse itself contracts into a series of pools. On average, the lake fills once in twenty years. The inflow of saline groundwater into the lower reaches of the river in recent years has severely affected its water quality, making the water more salty than sea water in several locations.

The river is crossed by the Pyrenees Highway near its source, the Henty Highway south of Horsham, and the Western Highway west of Horsham and, again, west of Dimboola.

The Wimmera has a feature typical of desert drainage patterns in that it has distributaries, the Dunmunkle Creek and the Yarriambiack Creek, which divert water away from the Wimmera at times of high flow or flood.

=== Pipeline ===
The health of the Wimmera River was expected to improve following the Wimmera-Mallee pipeline project that was completed in 2008. The project involved replacing old, inefficient stock-water supply and irrigation infrastructure, with a pipeline system. Prior to the project's completion, up to 90 percent of water extracted from the Wimmera River was lost through evaporation and seepage. The Wimmera-Mallee Pipeline system was expected to be many times more efficient and meant that there would be much less water extracted from the Wimmera River. That was anticipated to reduce the quantities of water taken from the river and cause an increase in environmental flows in the river system.

== Horsham flooding ==
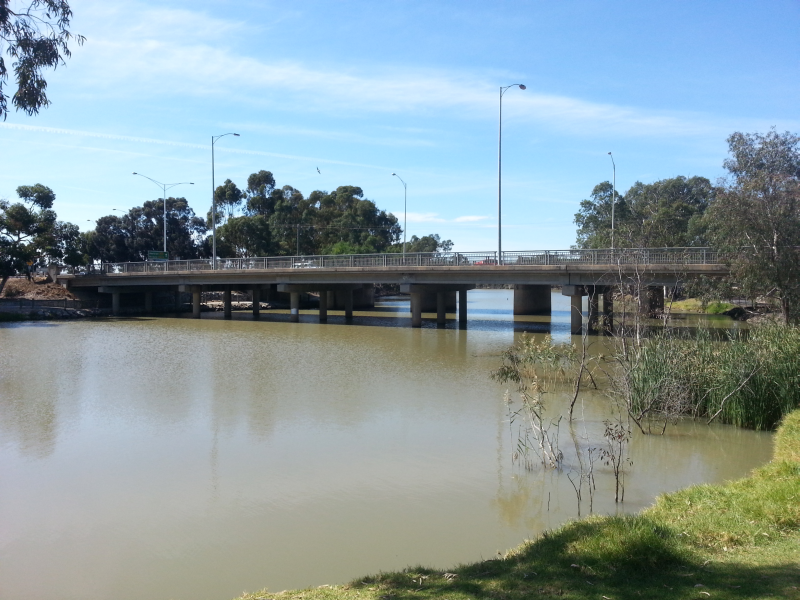
Western Highway crossing the Wimmera River at Horsham

The Wimmera River at Horsham has been subject to periodic flooding, with peaks recorded as follows:

Flooding events on the Wimmera River, near Horsham
Flood peak			Location(s)	References
m	ft	Date	Location(s)	References
4.71	15.5	January 2011		
3.87	12.7	October 1894	Dunmunkle and Yarriambiack creeks. Townships of Horsham, Glenorchy, Rupanyup, Warracknabeal, Dimboola and Jeparit affected.	
3.87	12.7	August 1909	Dunmunkle and Yarriambiack creeks. Townships of Horsham, Glenorchy, Rupanyup, Warracknabeal, Dimboola and Jeparit affected.	
3.73	12.2	September 1916	Townships of Glenorchy and Horsham affected.	
3.55	11.6	August 1981	Flood affected the Wimmera River and Yarriambiack Creek.	
3.49	11.5	October 1996		
3.32	10.9	September 2010		
3.30	10.8	October 1992		

== Etymology ==
In the Aboriginal Djadjawurrung and Jardwadjali languages the river is named Walla-walla, with no defined meaning; and Wamara, possibly meaning woomera or "throwing stick". In the Jardwadjali language the river is named Bunnut, with the Bernett people a clan of the Jardwadjali people; and Barbarton, with bar meaning "river" and the Barbardinbalug were a Jardwadjali clan centred on the Wimmera River. In the Djadjawurrung language the river is named Culcatok, with no defined meaning. In the Djabwurrung, Jardwadjali, and Wergaia languages, the river is named Billiwhin, with no defined meaning. In the Wergaia language the river has several names including Wudjum-bial, with bial meaning red gum; Barengi-djul, with bareng meaning "river" and djul meaning waterbags; Yaigir, with no defined meaning; Wudiyedi, with no defined meaning; Guri-beb, with beb meaning white gum; Giridji-gal, with a meaning that "a dog was always there"; Wadidirabul, with no defined meaning. In the Djabwurrung language the river has several names including Bar and Barkar, with bar meaning "river"; and Tarnorrer and Maripmunninnera, both with no defined meaning. In an undefined local Aboriginal language, the river is named Barrh, with no defined meaning.

The colonial name of the river is derived from the name of the pastoral run. Gold was discovered in the river in 1866.

== See also ==
- List of rivers of Australia § Victoria
