= Wergaia dialect =

Endangered Australian Aboriginal language

Wergaia
- Region: Victoria
- Ethnicity: Wergaia, Wotjobaluk
- Extinct: (date missing)
- Revival: 2020–2021
- Language family: Pama–Nyungan: Kulinic; Kulin; Wemba-Wemba; Wergaia
- Dialects: Biwadjali; Wudjubalug

Language codes
- ISO 639-3: Either: weg – Wergaia xwt – Wotjobaluk
- Glottolog: werg1234
- AIATSIS: S17
- ELP: Wergaia
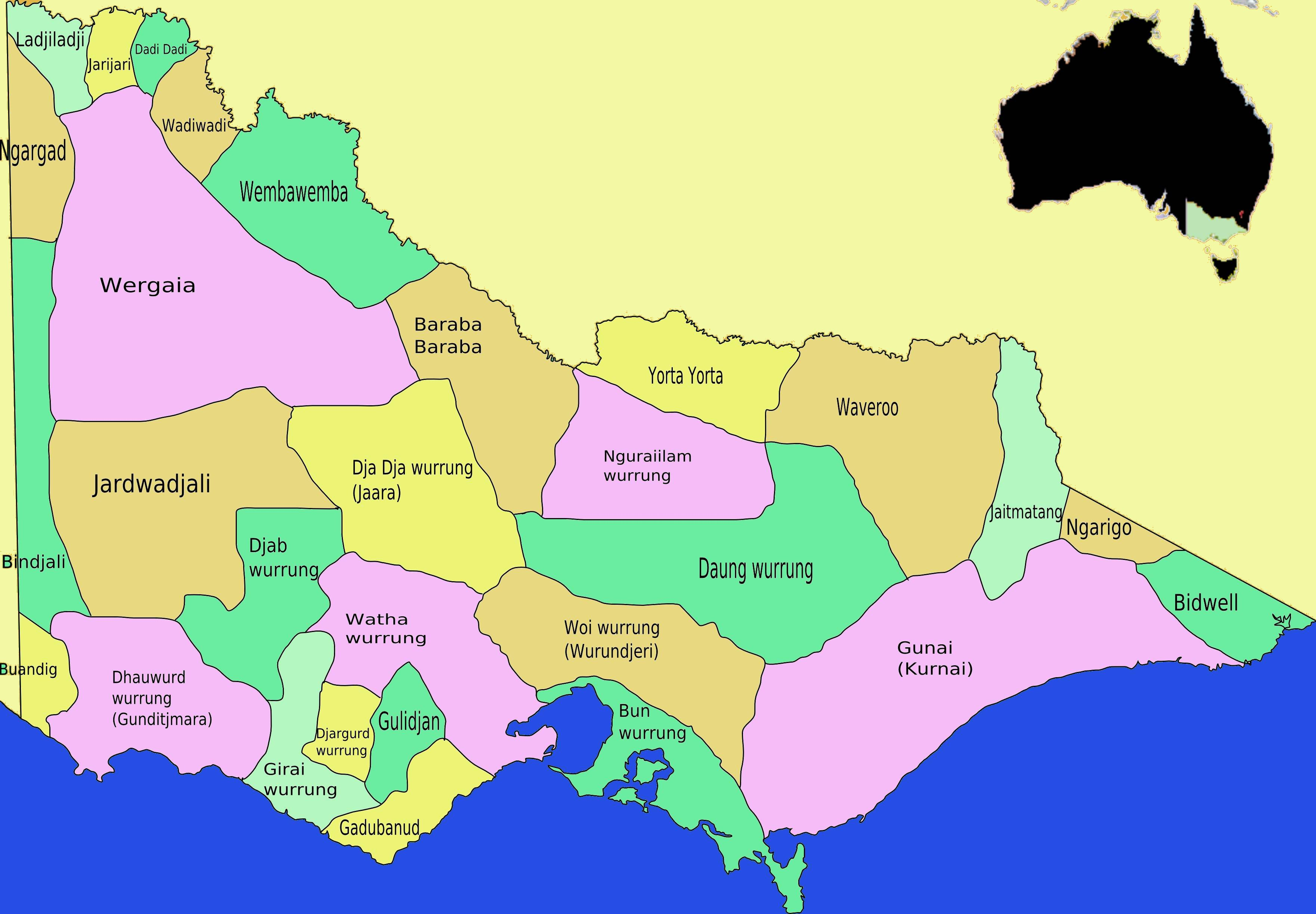
- Map of Aboriginal Victorian language territories

Wergaia or Werrigia is an Australian Aboriginal language in the Wimmera region of north-Western Victoria. The Wergaia language consists of four distinct dialects: Wudjubalug/Wotjobaluk, Djadjala/Djadjali, Buibadjali, Biwadjali. Wergaia is considered a dialect of the Wemba Wemba language, which belongs to the Kulinic branch of Pama–Nyungan.

The Aboriginal people who speak Wergaia dialects include the Maligundidj or Wergaia people, which means the people belonging to the mali (mallee) eucalypt bushland which covers much of their territory, and the Wotjobaluk people.

In mid-2021, a language revival project was launched at the Wotjobaluk Knowledge Place in Dimboola, which had been established in December 2020. A Wergaia language program would run over 20 weeks.

== Sounds ==
The following is the Djadjala dialect.

Consonant sounds
	Labial	Alveolar	Retroflex	Palatal	Velar
Stop	b	d	ɖ	ɟ	ɡ
Nasal	m	n	ɳ	ɲ	ŋ
Rhotic		r	ɽ		
Lateral		l			
Approximant	w			j	

Vowels given are /a e i u/.

== Some words ==
- dhallung (male or buck kangaroo)
- gal (dog)
- kulkun (a boy)
- laiaruk (a woman)
- lanangurk (a girl)
- mindyun (a kangaroo)
- muty (doer or female kangaroo)}
- winya nyua (Who is there?)
- wotjo (a man)

== Notes and references ==
=== References ===
- Clark, Ian (1990). Aboriginal Languages and Clans: An Historical Atlas of Western and Central Victoria, 1800-1900. Monash publications in geography, No.37. ISBN 978-0-909-68541-6.
- Clark, Ian (1995). Scars in the Landscape: A Register of Massacre Sites in Western Victoria, 1803-1859. Aboriginal Studies Press. ISBN 978-0-855-75595-9.
- Dixon, Robert M. W. (2002). Australian Languages: Their Nature and Development. Cambridge University Press. ISBN 978-0-521-47378-1.
