= Wimmera Southern Mallee (region) =

Coordinates: 37.45°S 142.45°E

Wimmera Southern Mallee Region
- Region
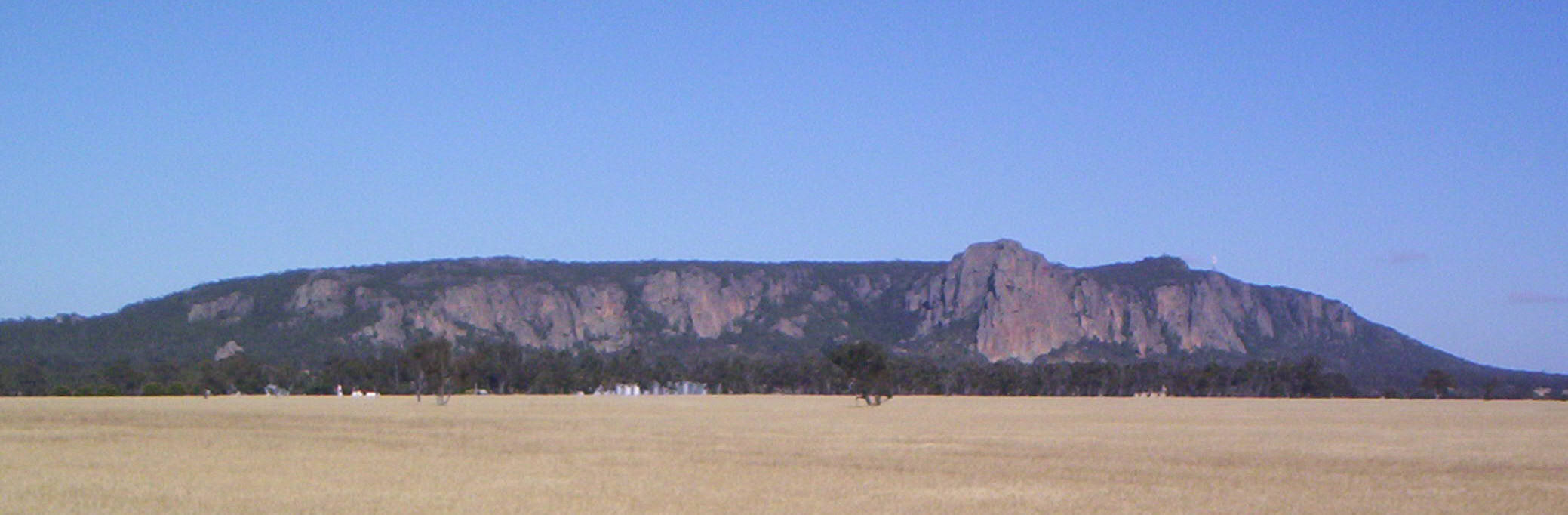
- Mount Arapiles rises above the flat Wimmera plain.
- Country: Australia
- State: Victoria
- Region: Grampians
- LGA: Shire of Hindmarsh; Rural City of Horsham; Shire of Northern Grampians; Shire of West Wimmera; Shire of Yarriambiack

Government
  - State electorate: Lowan; Ripon
  - Federal division: Mallee

Area (Note: Area figure is the combined population of all LGAs in the region)
  - Total: 41,963 km^{2} (16,202 sq mi)

Population
  - Total: 54,645 (2011 census) (Note: Population figure is the combined population of all LGAs in the region)
  - Density: 1.302219/km^{2} (3.37273/sq mi)
Regions around Wimmera Southern Mallee Region
Murray Mallee	Mallee	Loddon
Limestone Coast	Wimmera Southern Mallee Region	Goldfields
Limestone Coast	Western District	Central Highlands

The Victorian government's Wimmera Southern Mallee subregion is part of the Grampians region in western Victoria. It includes most of what is considered the Wimmera, and part of the southern Mallee region. The subregion is based on the social catchment of Horsham, its main settlement.

The Wimmera district covers the dryland farming area south of the range of Mallee scrub, east of the South Australia border and north of the Great Dividing Range.

Most of the Wimmera is very flat, with only the Grampians and Mount Arapiles rising above vast plains and the low plateaux that form the Great Divide in this part of Victoria. The Grampians are very rugged and tilted, with many sheer sandstone cliffs on their eastern sides, but gentle slopes on the west.

The Wimmera does not include the southern Mallee area in the north part of the Shire of Yarriambiack (around Hopetoun). It does include the southern part of the Shire of Buloke, which is not part of the Victorian government's aforementioned subregion (around Wycheproof, Birchip, Donald and Charlton). This latter area, plus the St Arnaud area, makes up the East Wimmera region.

In the context of the Interim Biogeographic Regionalisation for Australia, the Wimmera is a sub-region of 2,145,380 hectares (5,301,300 acres) located within the Murray Darling Depression bioregion.

The Wimmera is one of the nine districts in Victoria used for weather forecasting by the Australian Bureau of Meteorology.

The Victorian Department of Environment and Primary Industries defines the Wimmera as a 30,000-square-kilometre (12,000 sq mi) region for agricultural production purposes encompassing the Buloke, Hindmarsh, Horsham City, Northern Grampians, West Wimmera and Yarriambiack local government areas.

The Victorian Government's Wimmera Catchment Management Authority serves the catchment of the Wimmera River, and that of the Yarriambiack Creek south of the Mallee.

The Shire of Wimmera originally covered a large part of the Wimmera and southern Mallee, but retracted over time to cover only land near Horsham. It was later abolished, with most of it becoming part of the Rural City of Horsham.

The federal government Division of Wimmera originally covered roughly the same area as the Division of Mallee does today, but ended its life covering only the Wimmera area.

At the 2011 census, the six local government areas (LGAs) that are thought to comprise the Wimmera had a combined population of 54,645. The area of these same six LGAs is 41,963 square kilometres (16,202 sq mi).

== History ==
The area was inhabited by its Indigenous residents (and continues to be) when it was surveyed by the first European to do so Thomas Mitchell in the mid-1830s, and he is credited with naming the Grampians after a mountain range in his native Scotland, and naming the region as Wimmera, adapting a word from the local indigenous language meaning 'throwing stick'.

== Regional development and population ==
The area contains a number of important towns, such as Horsham, Warracknabeal, Dimboola, Stawell and Nhill. Almost all of these are largely dependent on the grain and sheep industries, and landscape is heavily dominated by flour mills and grain storage silos. The smaller towns in the area are dying due to the declining value of primary products that dominate the region's economy. Similarly, modern farm technology allows individual farmers to stay viable by farming more land, but the decreasing population, and better transport, make smaller service centres less and less viable.

Wimmera district LGA populations
Local government area	Area		Population (2011 census)	Source(s)
Local government area	km^{2}	sq mi	Population (2011 census)	Source(s)
Shire of Buloke ^{1}	8,004	3,090	6,384	
Shire of Hindmarsh	7,527	2,906	5,798	
Rural City of Horsham	4,249	1,641	19,279	
Shire of Northern Grampians	5,918	2,285	11,845	
Shire of West Wimmera	9,107	3,516	4,251	
Shire of Yarriambiack	7,158	2,764	7,088	
Totals	41,963	16,202	54,645	

^1 The Shire of Buloke is included in both the Mallee and the Wimmera districts; hence the imprecise definition.

== Climate ==
The climate is semi-arid to sub-humid, with annual rainfall ranging generally from 380 millimetres (15 in) in the north to 580 millimetres (23 in) in the south. In the Grampians, annual precipitation can be as high as 1,150 millimetres (45 in) and snowfalls are not uncommon. Most rain falls in winter, though heavy summer falls can occur, the most famous of which was the thunderstorm that dumped 133.2 millimetres (5.24 in) on Nhill in mid-January 1974.

Temperatures are hot in summer, ranging typically from a maximum of 30 °C (86 °F) to a minimum of 14 °C (57 °F), whilst extremes can be as high as 46 °C (115 °F). In the winter, maximums are 15 °C (59 °F), but mornings can be cool, averaging at Horsham 4 °C (39 °F).

== Geography ==
Most of the soils are very infertile and many are sandy; however in a narrow belt between Nhill and Warracknabeal there are heavy grey Vertisols, that, although still deficient in phosphorus, are otherwise free of major nutrient deficiencies and are able to hold water very well. These grey soils are the principal wheat soils of Victoria. Red-brown earths are also used for wheat but do not give as high yields and require more fertilisation.

The Wimmera River flows from the Pyrenees Ranges, across the northern foothills of the Grampians then towards Lake Hindmarsh. Many streams in the region flow only after sustained heavy rainfall and are often dry for long spells. In recent years Rocklands Reservoir, the main water storage of the district, has been consistently at unusually low levels due to a succession of dry years.

== Natural heritage ==
The Wimmera is renowned for its natural heritage.

One of the key preservation areas is contained within the Grampians National Park, which possesses many unusual wildflowers and the greatest diversity of flora and fauna in Victoria west of the Snowy River. The Grampians also possess many important Aboriginal artifacts. A local Aboriginal name Gariwerd was adopted by the National Park in 1991 in recognition of this fact; however, this change was soon reversed after a change of state government in 1992.

The Little Desert National Park, south of Nhill and west of Dimboola, is a large wilderness area of sand dunes that were too infertile for productive farming even with superphosphate and trace elements.

== See also ==
- Geography of Victoria
- Regions of Victoria
