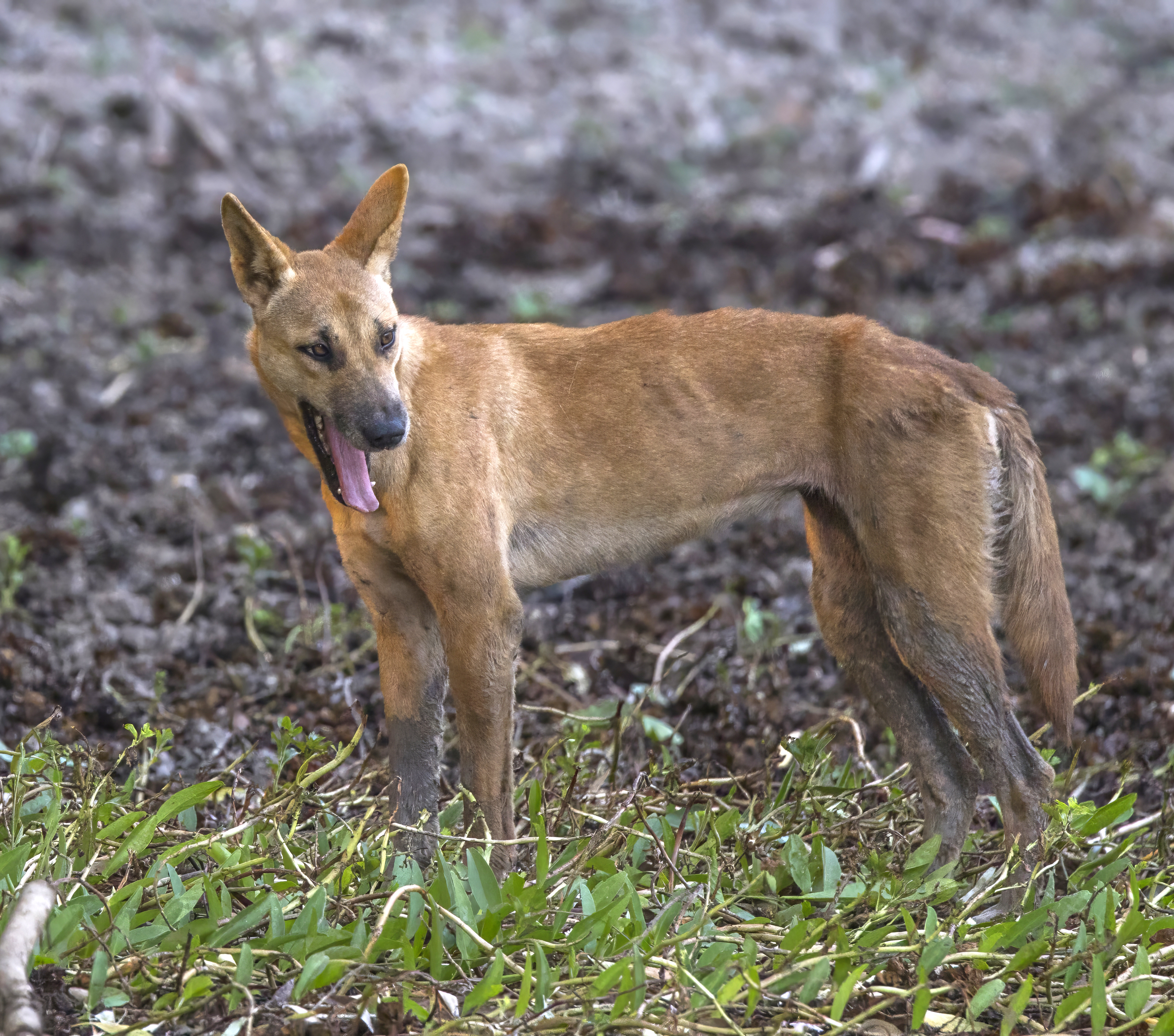
- Kakadu National Park NT

Scientific classification
- Kingdom: Animalia
- Phylum: Chordata
- Class: Mammalia
- Order: Carnivora
- Family: Canidae
- Genus: Canis
- Species: C. familiaris

Binomial name
- Canis familiaris Linnaeus, 1758
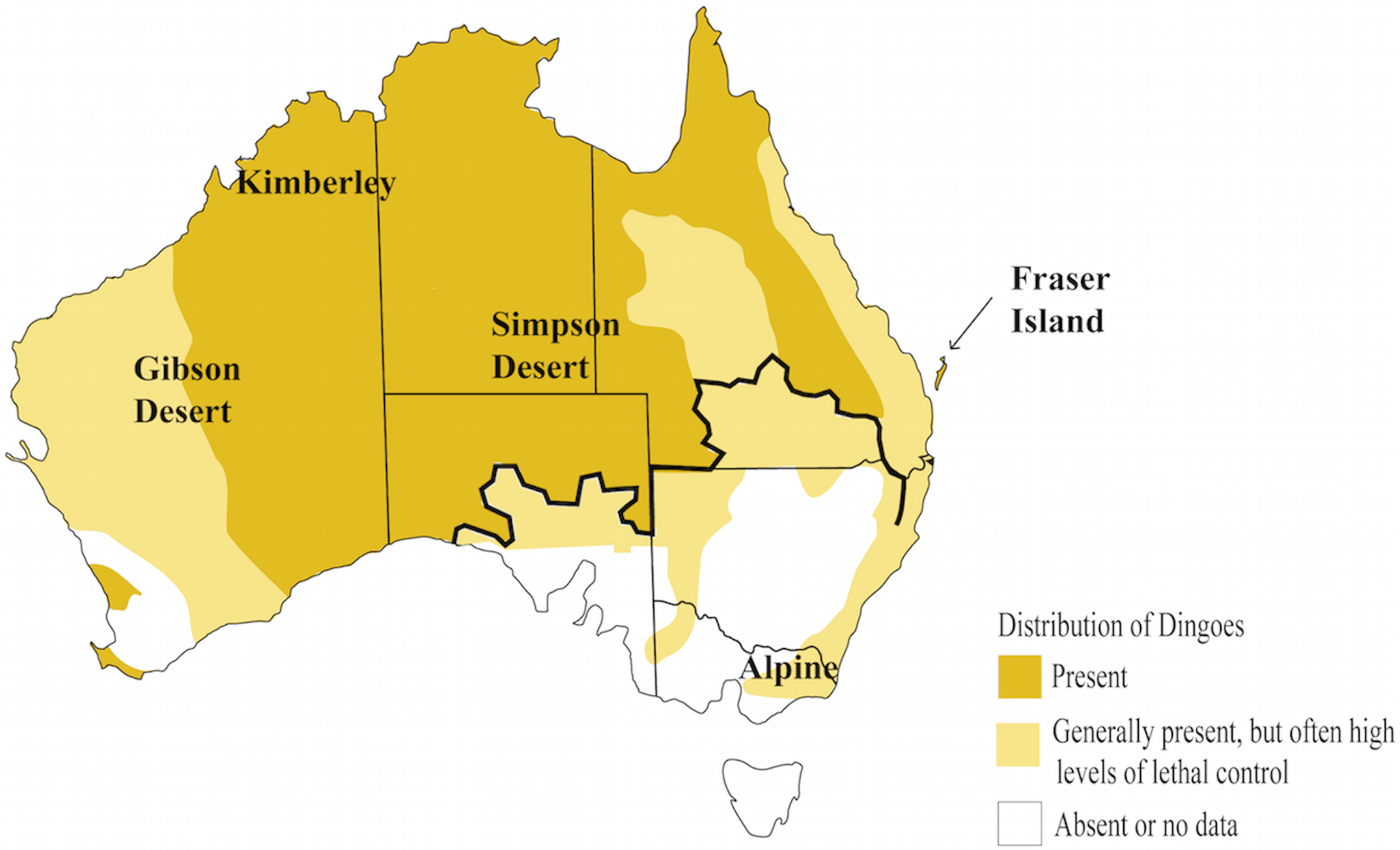
- Distribution of the dingo: dingoes south of the dingo fence (black line) may have a higher prevalence of hybridisation.

Synonyms
- Canis familiaris dingo Meyer, 1793; Canis lupus dingo Meyer, 1793; Canis dingo Meyer, 1793

= Dingo =

Dingo Temporal range: Holocene (3,450 years BP – recent)

Canid species native to Australia

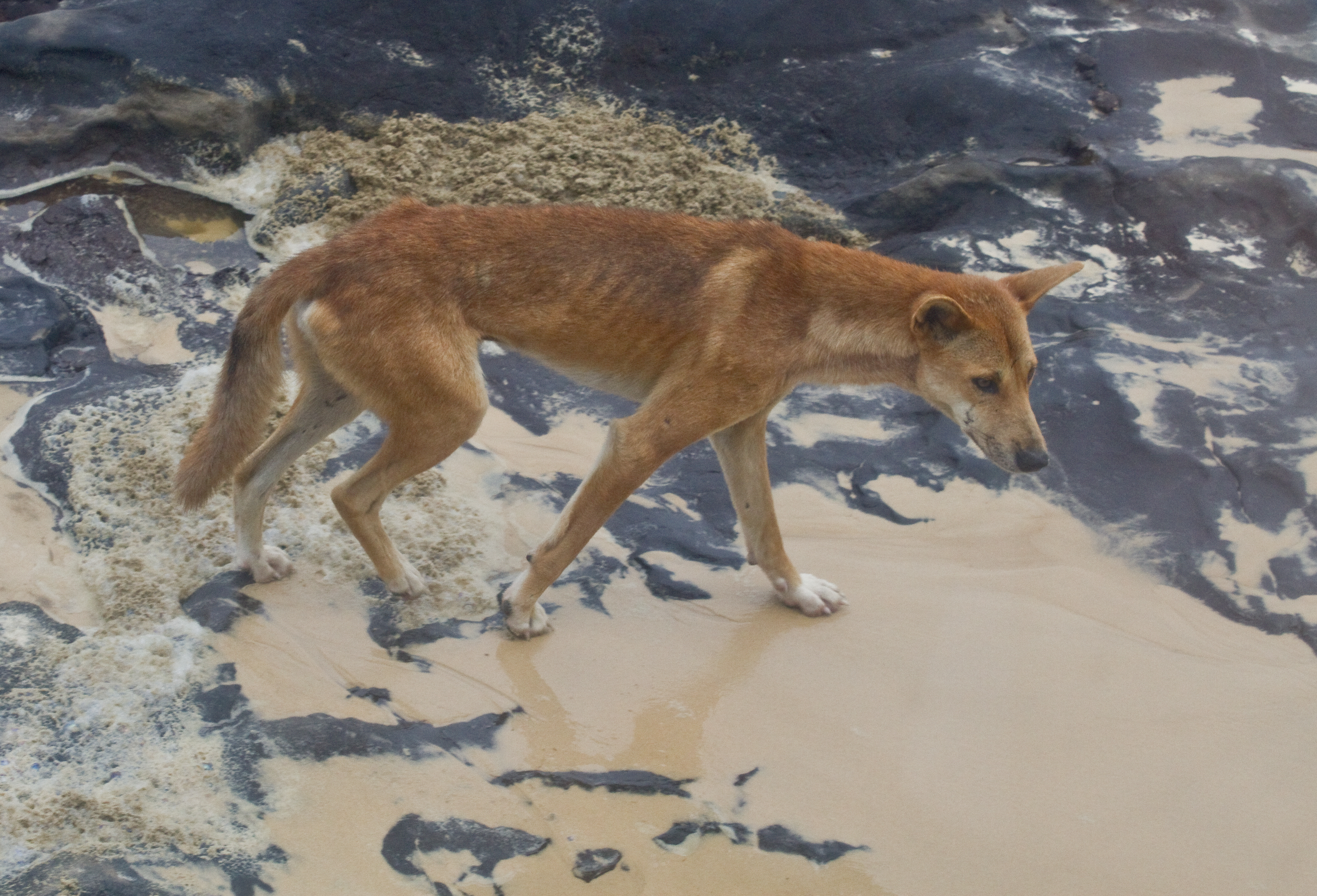
On the beach at K'gari, Queensland

The dingo is a lineage of dog found in Australia. It is a medium-sized canine that possesses a lean, hardy body adapted for speed, agility, and stamina. Its three main coat colourations are light ginger or tan, black and tan, or creamy white. The skull is wedge-shaped and appears large in proportion to the body.

Its taxonomic classification is debated: it is variously considered a form of domestic dog (Canis familiaris or Canis lupus familiaris) not warranting recognition as a subspecies, or a subspecies of dog (Canis familiaris dingo) or wolf (Canis lupus dingo), or a full species in its own right (Canis dingo). The dingo is closely related to the New Guinea singing dog; their lineage split early from the lineage that led to today's domestic dogs, and can be traced back through Maritime Southeast Asia to Asia. The oldest remains of dingoes discovered in Australia are around 3,500 years old.

A dingo pack usually consists of a mated pair, their offspring from the current year, and sometimes offspring from the previous year. Well-known populations of dingoes include those on K'gari, Queensland, and the Wilkerr population in north-western Victoria.

== Etymology ==
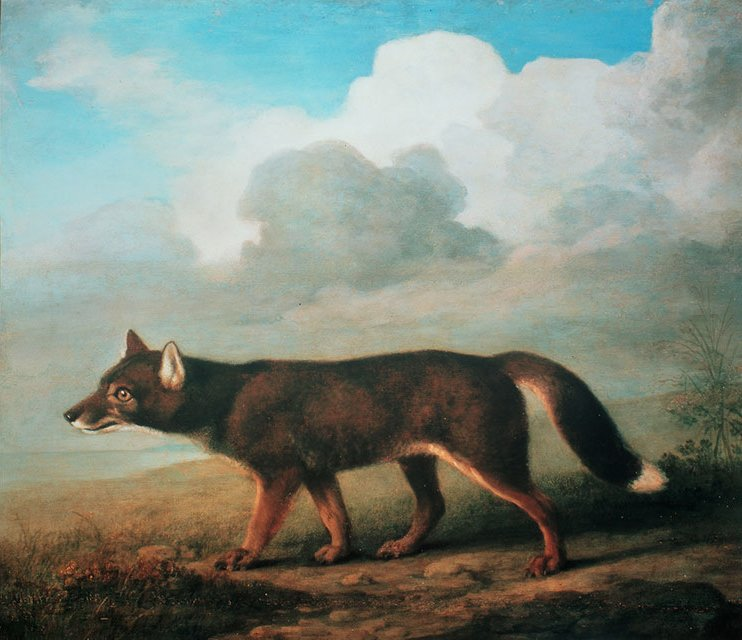
Portrait of a Large Dog from New Holland by George Stubbs, 1772. National Maritime Museum, Greenwich.

The name "dingo" comes from the Dharug language used by the Indigenous Australians of the Sydney area. The first British colonists to arrive in Australia in 1788 established a settlement at Port Jackson and noted "dingoes" living with Indigenous Australians. The name was first recorded in 1789 by Watkin Tench in his Narrative of the Expedition to Botany Bay:

The only domestic animal they have is the dog, which in their language is called Dingo, and a good deal resembles the fox dog of England. These animals are equally shy of us, and attached to the natives. One of them is now in the possession of the Governor, and tolerably well reconciled to his new master.

Related Dharug words include "ting-ko" meaning "bitch", and "tun-go-wo-re-gal" meaning "large dog". The dingo has different names in different Aboriginal Australian languages, such as boolomo, dwer-da, joogoong, kal, kurpany, maliki, mirigung, noggum, papa-inura, and wantibirri. On K'gari (formerly Fraser Island) in Queensland, where the dingo population is long-established and well-known, the wongari has a significant place in the culture of the traditional owners of the island, the Butchulla people.

Some authors propose that a difference existed between camp dingoes and wild dingoes as they had different names among Aboriginal Australian peoples. The people of the Yarralin, Northern Territory, region frequently call those dingoes that live with them warlagu, and those that live in the wilderness ngurragin. They also use the name warlagu to refer to both dingoes and dogs. The colonial settlers of New South Wales used the name dingo only for camp dogs. In New South Wales the camp dingoes became wild only after the colonial destruction of Aboriginal society.

== Taxonomy ==
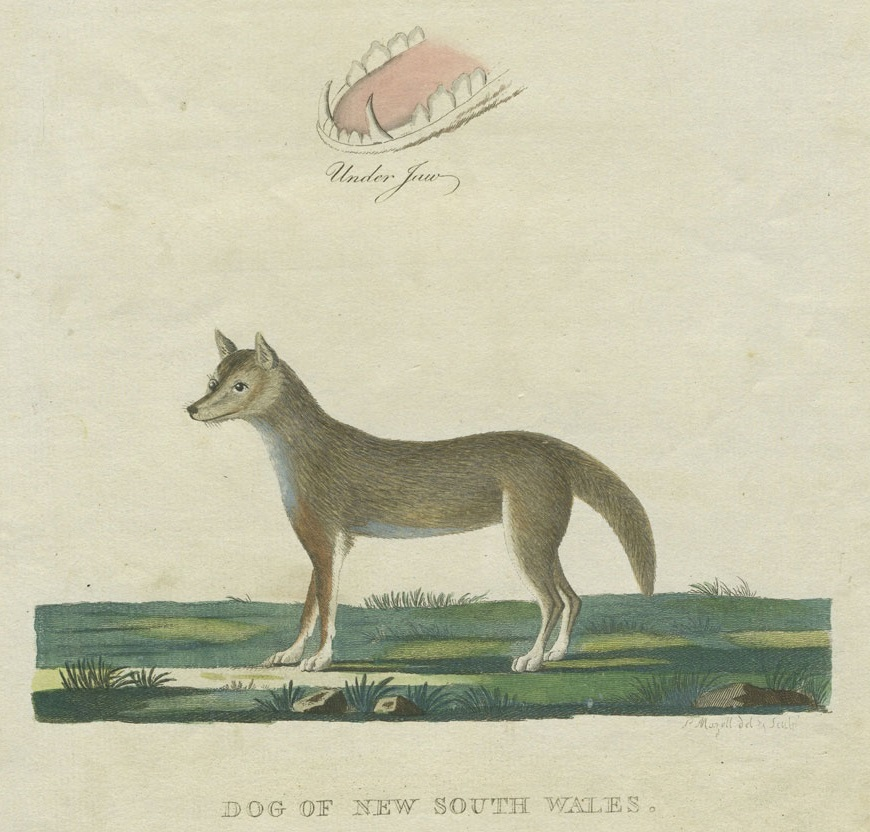
"Dog of New South Wales" illustrated in The Voyage of Governor Phillip to Botany Bay in 1788

Dogs associated with indigenous people were first recorded by Jan Carstenszoon in the Cape York Peninsula area in 1623. In 1699, Captain William Dampier visited the coast of what is now Western Australia and recorded that "my men saw two or three beasts like hungry wolves, lean like so many skeletons, being nothing but skin and bones". In 1788, the First Fleet arrived in Botany Bay under the command of Australia's first colonial governor, Arthur Phillip, who took ownership of a dingo and in his journal made a brief description with an illustration of the "Dog of New South Wales". In 1793, based on Phillip's brief description and illustration, the "Dog of New South Wales" was classified by Friedrich Meyer as Canis dingo.

In 1999, a study of the maternal lineage through the use of mitochondrial DNA (mDNA) as a genetic marker indicates that the dingo and New Guinea singing dog developed at a time when human populations were more isolated from each other. In the third edition of Mammal Species of the World, published in 2005, the mammalogist W. Christopher Wozencraft listed under the wolf Canis lupus its wild subspecies, and proposed two additional subspecies: "familiaris Linnaeus, 1758 [domestic dog]" and "dingo Meyer, 1793 [domestic dog]". Wozencraft included hallstromi—the New Guinea singing dog—as a taxonomic synonym for the dingo. He referred to the mDNA study as one of the guides in forming his decision. The inclusion of familiaris and dingo under a "domestic dog" clade has been noted by other mammalogists, and their classification under the wolf debated.

In 2019, a workshop hosted by the IUCN/SSC Canid Specialist Group considered the New Guinea singing dog and the dingo to be feral dogs (Canis familiaris), which therefore should not be assessed for the IUCN Red List.

In 2020, the American Society of Mammalogists considered the dingo a synonym of the domestic dog. Recent DNA sequencing of a 'pure' wild dingo from South Australia suggests that the dingo has a different DNA methylation pattern from the German Shepherd. In 2024, a study found that the Dingo and New Guinea singing dog show 5.5% genome introgression from the ancestor of the recently extinct Japanese wolf, with Japanese dogs showing 4% genome introgression. This introgression occurred before the ancestor of the Japanese wolf arrived in Japan.

=== Domestic status ===
The dingo is regarded as a feral dog because it descended from domesticated ancestors. The dingo's relationship with Indigenous Australians is one of commensalism, in which two organisms live in close association but do not depend on each other for survival. They both hunt and sleep together. The dingo is therefore comfortable enough around humans to associate with them but is still capable of living independently. Any free-ranging, unowned dog can be socialised to become an owned dog, as some dingoes do when they join human families. Although the dingo exists in the wild, it associates with humans but has not been selectively bred, unlike other domesticated animals. Therefore its status as a domestic animal is not clear. Whether the dingo was a wild or domesticated species was not clarified from Meyer's original description, which translated from German reads:

It is not known if it is the only dog species in New South Wales nor if it can also still be found in the wild state; however so far it appears to have lost little of its wild condition; moreover, no divergent varieties have been discovered.

=== History ===
The earliest-known dingo remains, found in Western Australia, date to 3,450 years ago. Based on a comparison of modern dingoes with these early remains, dingo morphology has not changed over those thousands of years. This suggests that no artificial selection has been applied over that period and that the dingo represents an early form of dog. They have lived, bred, and undergone natural selection in the wild, isolated from other dogs until the arrival of European settlers, resulting in a unique breed.

In 2020, a study using mitochondrial DNA from ancient dog remains from the Yellow River and Yangtze River basins of southern China showed that most of these ancient dogs belong to the haplogroup A1b lineage; this lineage is also found at high frequencies among Australian dingoes and the pre-colonial dogs of the Pacific but is found at low frequencies in China today. The dogs belonging to this haplogroup were once widely distributed in southern China, then dispersed through Southeast Asia into New Guinea and Oceania, but were replaced in China by dogs of other lineages 2,000 years before present (YBP).

The oldest reliable date for dog remains found in mainland Southeast Asia is from Vietnam at 4,000 YBP, and in Island Southeast Asia from Timor-Leste at 3,000 YBP. The earliest dingo remains in the Torres Strait date to 2,100 YBP. In New Guinea the earliest dog remains date to 2,500–2,300 YBP from Caution Bay near Port Moresby, but no ancient New Guinea singing dog remains have been found.

The earliest dingo skeletal remains in Australia are estimated at 3,450 YBP from the Madura Caves on the Nullarbor Plain, south-eastern Western Australia; 3,320 YBP from Woombah Midden near Woombah, New South Wales; and 3,170 YBP from Fromme's Landing on the Murray River near Mannum, South Australia. Dingo bone fragments were found in a rock shelter located at Mount Burr, South Australia, in a layer that was originally dated 7,000–8,500 YBP. Excavations later indicated that the levels had been disturbed, and the dingo remains "probably moved to an earlier level." The dating of these early Australian dingo fossils led to the widely held belief that dingoes first arrived in Australia 4,000 YBP and then took 500 years to disperse around the continent. However, the timing of these skeletal remains was based on the dating of the sediments in which they were discovered, and not the specimens themselves.

In 2018, the oldest skeletal bones from the Madura Caves were directly carbon dated between 3,348 and 3,081 YBP, providing the earliest evidence of the dingo and that dingoes may have arrived later than had previously been proposed. The next-most reliable timing is based on desiccated flesh dated 2,200 YBP from Thylacine Hole, 110 km west of Eucla on the Nullarbor Plain, southeastern Western Australia. When dingoes first arrived, they would have been taken up by Indigenous Australians, who then provided a network for their swift transfer around the continent. Based on the recorded distribution time for dogs across Tasmania and cats across Australia once indigenous Australians had acquired them, the dispersal of dingoes from their point of landing until they occupied continental Australia is proposed to have taken only 70 years. The red fox is estimated to have dispersed across the continent in only 60–80 years.

At the end of the last glacial maximum and the associated rise in sea levels, Tasmania became separated from the Australian mainland 12,000 YBP, and New Guinea 6,500–8,500 YBP by the inundation of the Sahul Shelf. Fossil remains in Australia date to around 3,500 YBP and no dingo remains have been uncovered in Tasmania, so the dingo is estimated to have arrived in Australia at a time between 3,500 and 12,000 YBP. To reach Australia through Island Southeast Asia even at the lowest sea level of the last glacial maximum, a journey of at least 50 kilometres (31 mi) over open sea between ancient Sunda and Sahul was necessary, so they must have accompanied humans on boats.

=== Phylogeny ===
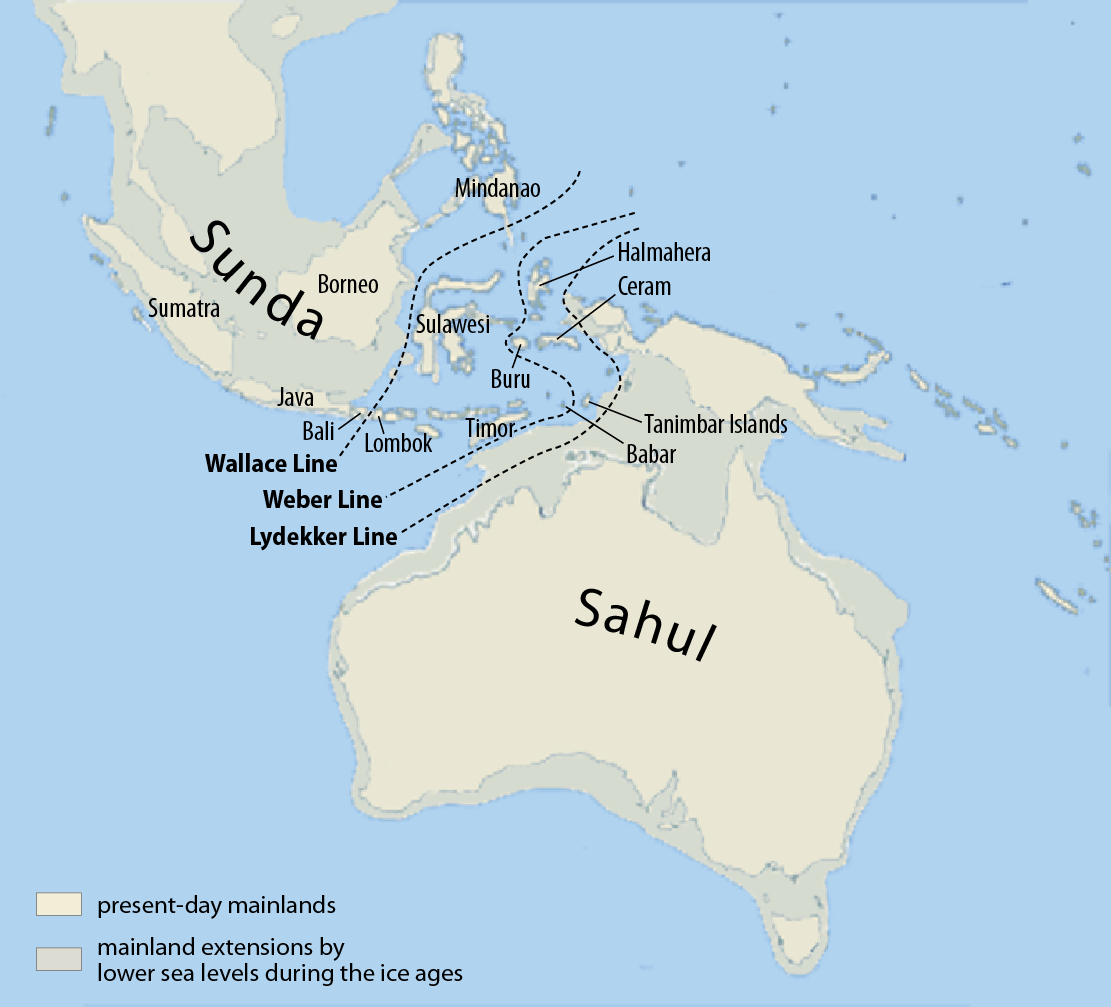
The Sahul Shelf and the Sunda Shelf during the past 12,000 years: Tasmania separated from the mainland 12,000 YBP, and New Guinea separated from the mainland 6,500–8,500 YBP.

Whole genome sequencing indicates that, while dogs are a genetically divergent subspecies of the grey wolf, the dog is not a descendant of the extant grey wolf. Rather, these are sister taxa that share a common ancestor from a ghost population of wolves that disappeared at the end of the Late Pleistocene. The dog and the dingo are not considered separate species by all researchers, with those considering the dingo to be a member of C. familiaris referring to them as a "basal breed", alongside the Basenji. (Note: "The term basal taxon refers to a lineage that diverges early in the history of the group and lies on a branch that originates near the common ancestor of the group". — Reece (2015))

Mitochondrial genome sequences indicate that the dingo falls within the domestic dog clade, and that the New Guinea singing dog is genetically closer to those dingoes that live in southeastern Australia than to those that live in the northwest. The dingo and New Guinea singing dog lineage can be traced back from Island Southeast Asia to Mainland Southeast Asia. Gene flow from the genetically divergent Tibetan wolf forms 2% of the dingo's genome, which likely represents ancient admixture in eastern Eurasia.

By the close of the last ice age 11,700 years ago, five ancestral dog lineages had diversified from each other, with one of these being represented today by the New Guinea singing dog. In 2020, the first whole genome sequencing of the dingo and the New Guinea singing dog was undertaken. The study indicates that the ancestral lineage of the dingo/New Guinea singing dog clade arose in southern East Asia, migrated through Island Southeast Asia 9,900 YBP, and reached Australia 8,300 YBP; however, the human population which brought them remains unknown. The dingo's genome indicates that it was once a domestic dog which commenced a process of feralisation since its arrival 8,300 years ago, with the new environment leading to changes in those genomic regions which regulate metabolism, neurodevelopment, and reproduction.

A 2016 genetic study shows that the lineage of those dingoes found today in the northwestern part of the Australian continent split from the lineage of the New Guinea singing dog and southeastern dingo 8,300 years ago, followed by a split between the New Guinea singing dog lineage from the southeastern dingo lineage 7,800 years ago. The study proposes that two dingo migrations occurred when sea levels were lower and Australia and New Guinea formed one landmass named Sahul that existed until 6,500–8,000 years ago. Whole genome analysis of the dingo indicates there are three sub-populations which exist in Northeast (Tropical), Southeast (Alpine), and West/Central Australia (Desert). Morphological data showing the dingo skulls from Southeastern Australia (Alpine dingoes) being quite distinct from the other ecotypes. And genomic and mitochondrial DNA sequencing demonstrating at least two dingo mtDNA haplotypes colonised Australia.

In 2020, a genetic study found that the New Guinea Highland wild dogs were sister to the dingo and the New Guinea singing dog.

== Description ==
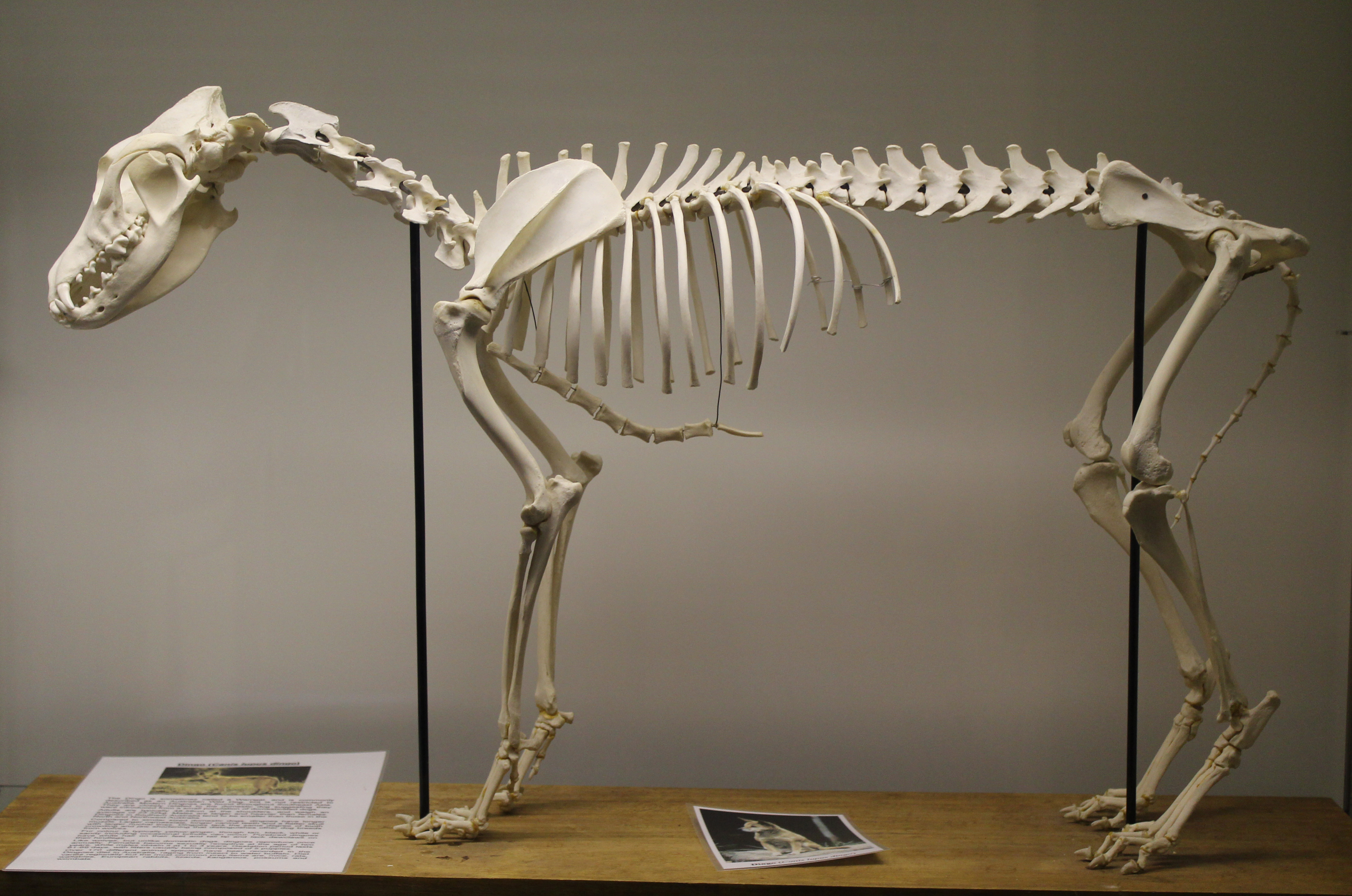
Skeleton

The dingo is a medium-sized canid with a lean, hardy body that is adapted for speed, agility, and stamina. The head is the widest part of the body, wedge-shaped, and large in proportion to the body. Captive dingoes are longer and heavier than wild dingoes, as they have access to better food and veterinary care. The average wild dingo male weighs 15.8 kg (35 lb) and the female 14.1 kg (31 lb), compared with the captive male 18.9 kg (42 lb) and the female 16.2 kg (36 lb). The average wild dingo male length is 125 cm (49 in) and the female 122 cm (48 in), compared with the captive male 136 cm (54 in) and the female 133 cm (52 in). The average wild dingo male stands at the shoulder height of 59 cm (23 in) and the female 56 cm (22 in), compared with the captive male 56 cm (22 in) and the female 53 cm (21 in). Dingoes rarely carry excess fat and the wild ones display exposed ribs. Dingoes from northern and northwestern Australia are often larger than those found in central and southern Australia. The dingo is similar to the New Guinea singing dog in morphology apart from the dingo's greater height at the withers. The average dingo can reach speeds of up to 60 kilometres per hour.

Compared with the dog, the dingo is able to rotate its wrists and can turn doorknobs or raise latches in order to escape confinement. Dingo shoulder joints are unusually flexible, and they can climb fences, cliffs, trees, and rocks. These adaptations help dingoes climbing in difficult terrain, where they prefer high vantage points. A similar adaptation can be found in the Norwegian Lundehund, which was developed on isolated Norwegian islands to hunt in cliff and rocky areas. Wolves do not have this ability.

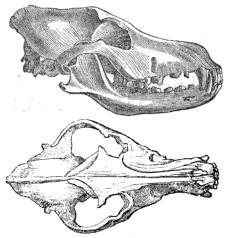
Sketching of a skull by Frédéric Cuvier

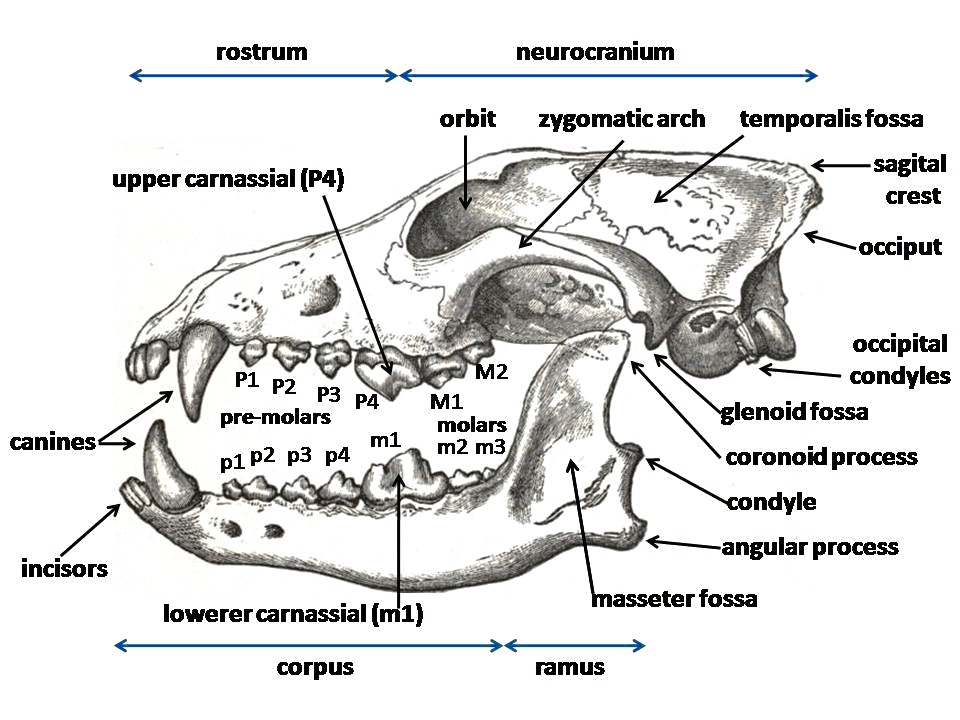
Key features of a wolf skull and dentition

Compared with the skull of the dog, the dingo possesses a longer muzzle, longer carnassial teeth, longer and more slender canine teeth, larger auditory bullae, a flatter cranium with a larger sagittal crest, and larger nuchal lines. In 2014, a study was conducted on pre-20th century dingo specimens that are unlikely to have been influenced by later hybridisation. The dingo skull was found to differ relative to the domestic dog by its larger palatal width, longer rostrum, shorter skull height, and wider sagittal crest. However, this was rebutted with the figures falling within the wider range of the domestic dog and that each dog breed differs from the others in skull measurements. Based on a comparison with the remains of a dingo found at Fromme's Landing, the dingo's skull and skeleton have not changed over the past 3,000 years. Compared to the wolf, the dingo possesses a paedomorphic cranium similar to domestic dogs. However, the dingo has a larger brain size compared to dogs of the same body weight, with the dingo being more comparable with the wolf than dogs are. In this respect, the dingo resembles two similar mesopredators, the dhole and the coyote. The eyes are triangular (or almond-shaped) and are hazel to dark in colour with dark rims. The ears are erect and occur high on the skull.

=== Coat colour ===
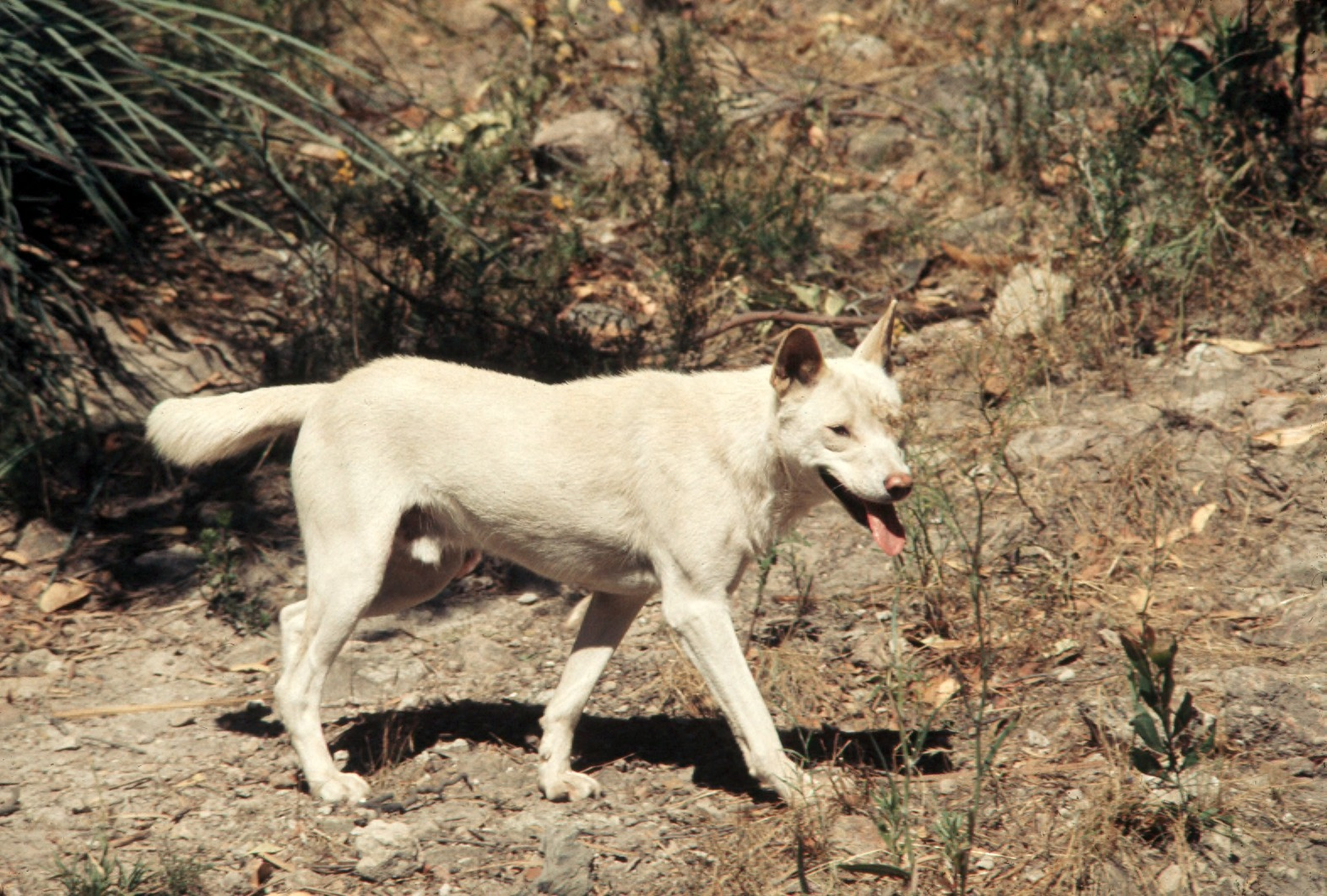
Creamy white

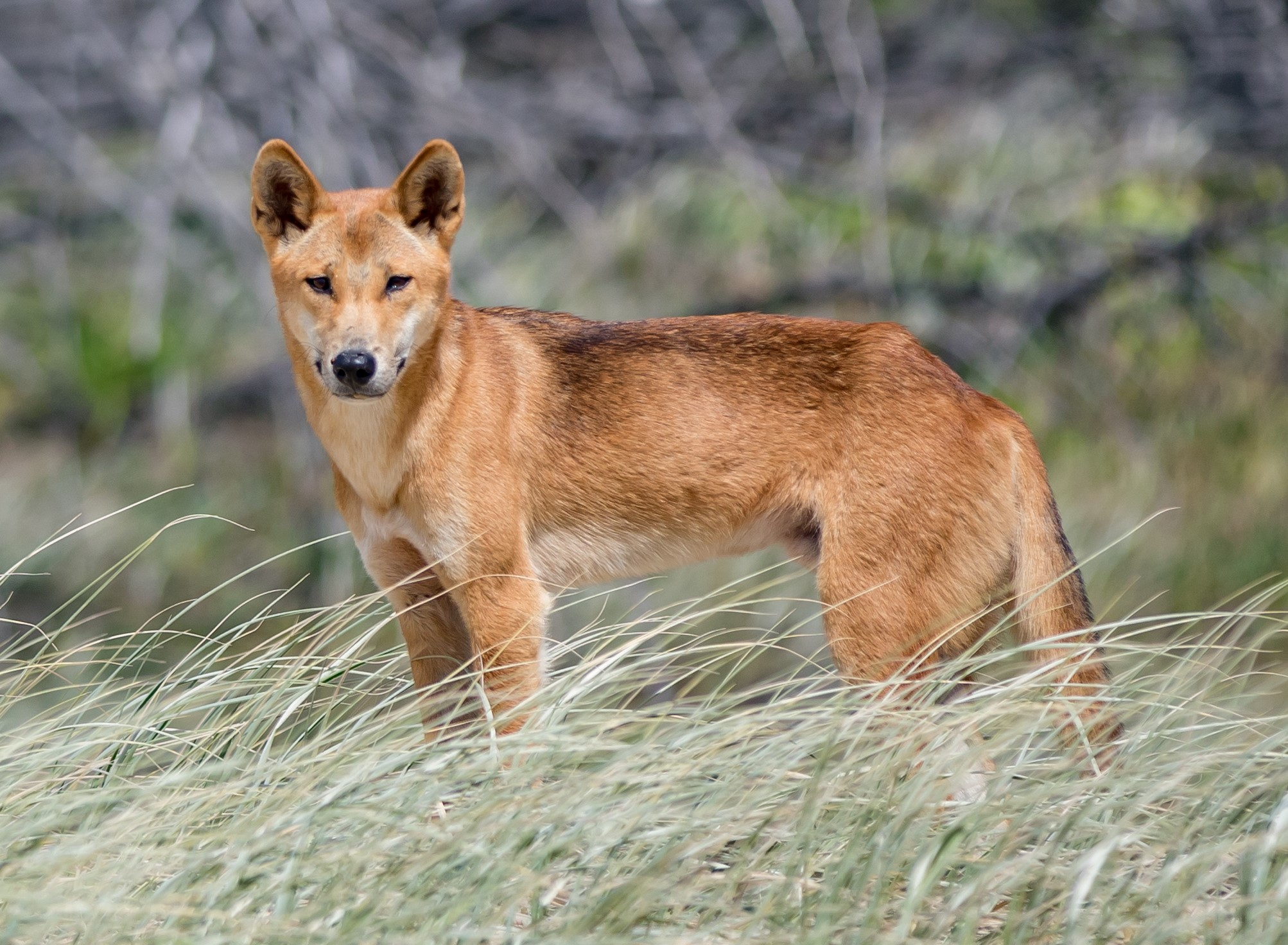
Tan or light ginger

The dingo's three main coat colours are described as being light ginger (or tan), black and tan, and creamy white. The ginger colour ranges from a deep rust to a pale cream and can be found in 74% of dingoes. Often, small white markings are seen on the tip of the tail, the feet, and the chest, but with no large white patches. Some do not exhibit white tips. The black and tan dingoes possess a black coat with a tan muzzle, chest, belly, legs, and feet and can be found in 12% of dingoes. Solid white can be found in 2% of dingoes and solid black 1%.

Only three genes affect coat colour in the dingo compared with nine genes in the domestic dog. The ginger colour is dominant and carries the other three main colours – black, tan, and white. White dingoes breed true, and black and tan dingoes breed true; when these cross, the result is a sandy colour. The coat is not oily, nor does it have a dog-like odour. The dingo has a single coat in the tropical north of Australia and a double thick coat in the cold mountains of the south, the undercoat being a wolf-grey colour. Patchy and brindle coat colours can be found in dingoes with no dog ancestry and these colours are less common in dingoes of mixed ancestry.

=== Tail ===
The dingo's tail is flattish, tapering after mid-length and does not curve over the back, but is carried low.

=== Gait ===
When walking, the dingo's rear foot steps in line with the front foot, and these do not possess dewclaws.

=== Lifespan ===
Dingoes in the wild live 3–5 years with few living past 7–8 years. Some have been recorded living up to 10 years. In captivity, they live for 14–16 years. One dingo has been recorded to live just under 20 years.

== Adaptation ==
=== Hybrids, distribution and habitat ===
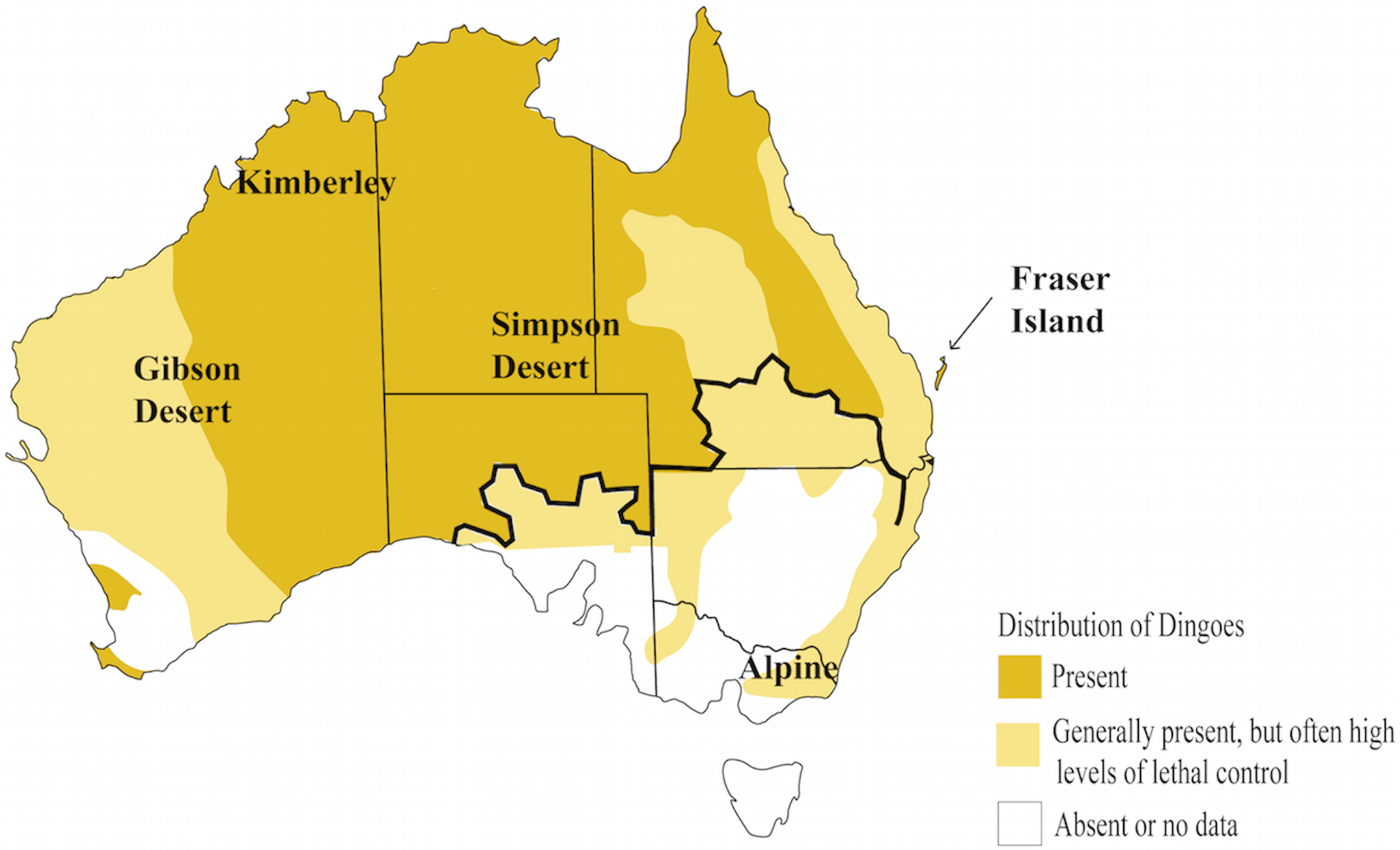
Distribution: dingoes south of the Dingo Fence (black line) may have a higher prevalence of dingo–dog hybrids.

The wolf-like canids are a group of large carnivores that are genetically closely related because their chromosomes number 78; therefore they can potentially interbreed to produce fertile hybrids. In the Australian wild there exist dingoes, feral dogs, and the crossings of these two, which produce dingo–dog hybrids. Most studies looking at the distribution of dingoes focus on the distribution of dingo–dog hybrids, instead.

Dingoes occurred throughout mainland Australia before European colonisation. They are not found in the fossil record of Tasmania, so they apparently arrived in Australia after Tasmania had separated from the mainland due to rising sea levels. The introduction of agriculture reduced dingo distribution, and by the early 1900s, large barrier fences, including the Dingo Fence, excluded them from the sheep-grazing areas. Land clearance, poisoning, and trapping caused the extinction of the dingo and hybrids from most of their former range in southern Queensland, New South Wales, Victoria, and South Australia. By the 21st century they were mostly absent from most of New South Wales, Victoria, the southeastern third of South Australia, and the southwestern tip of Western Australia, and sparse in the eastern half of Western Australia and the adjoining areas of the Northern Territory and South Australia. They are regarded as common across the remainder of the continent.

The dingo could be considered an ecotype or an ecospecies that has adapted to Australia's unique environment. The dingo's present distribution covers a variety of habitats, including the temperate regions of eastern Australia, the alpine moorlands of the eastern highlands, the arid hot deserts of Central Australia, and the tropical forests and wetlands of Northern Australia. The occupation of, and adaption to, these habitats may have been assisted by their relationship with Indigenous Australians.

=== Prey and diet ===
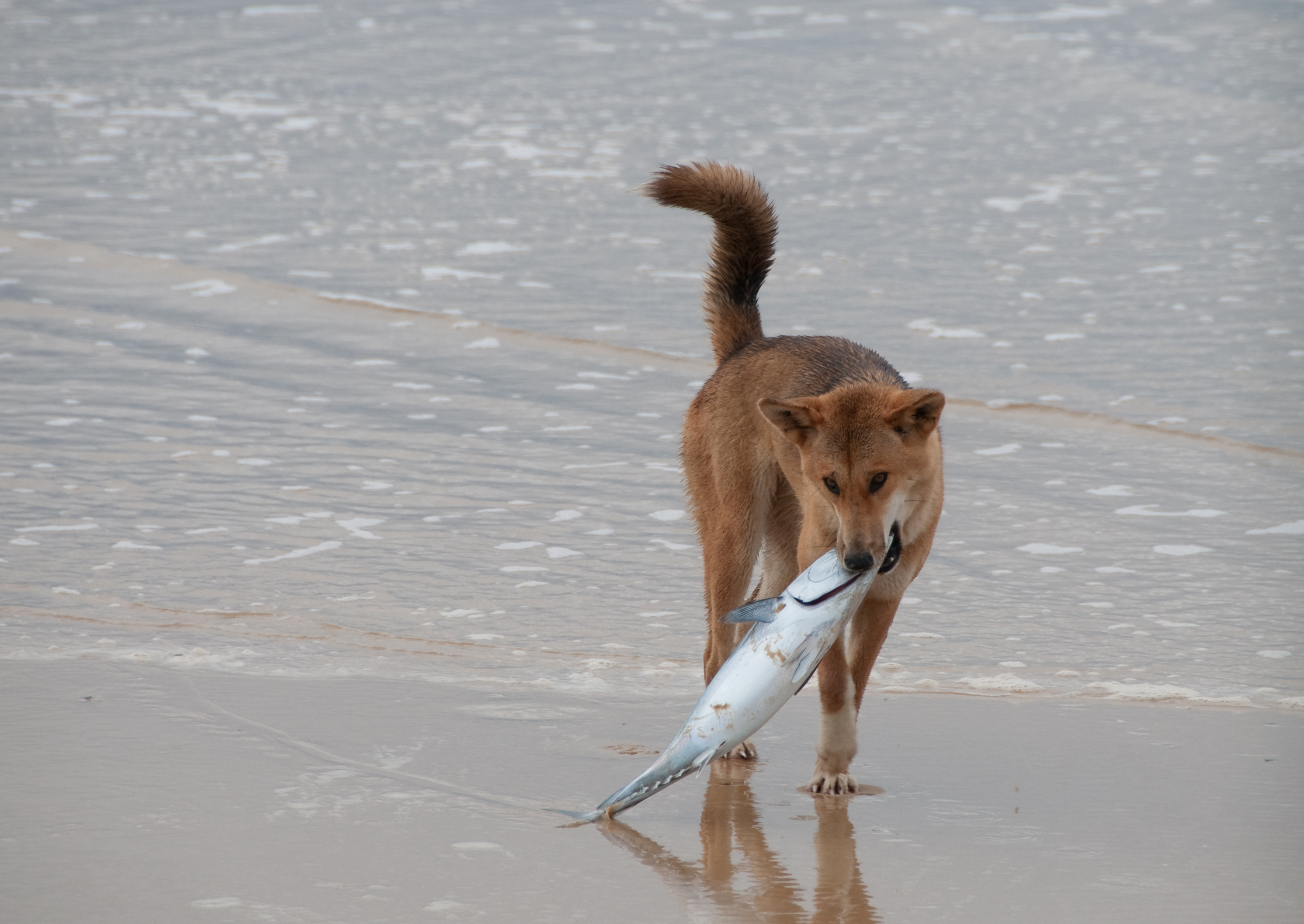
With a fish on K'gari (Fraser Island), Queensland

A 20-year study of the dingo's diet was conducted across Australia by the federal and state governments. These examined a total of 13,000 stomach contents and fecal samples. For the fecal samples, determining the matching tracks of foxes and feral cats was possible without including these samples in the study, but in distinguishing between the tracks left by dingoes and those of dingo hybrids or feral dogs was impossible. The study found that these canines prey on 177 species represented by 72.3% mammals (71 species), 18.8% birds (53 species), 3.3% vegetation (seeds), 1.8% reptiles (23 species), and 3.8% insects, fish, crabs, and frogs (28 species). The relative proportions of prey are much the same across Australia, apart from more birds being eaten in the north and south-east coastal regions, and more lizards in Central Australia. Some 80% of the diet consisted of 11 species: red kangaroo, swamp wallaby, cattle, sheep, dusky rat, magpie goose, common brushtail possum, long-haired rat, agile wallaby, European rabbit, and common wombat. Of the mammals eaten, 20% could be regarded as large.

However, the relative proportions of the size of prey mammals varied across regions. In the tropical coast region of northern Australia, agile wallabies, dusky rats, and magpie geese formed 80% of the diet. In Central Australia, the rabbit has become a substitute for native mammals, and during droughts, cattle carcasses provide most of the diet. On the Barkly Tableland, no rabbits occur nor does any native species dominate the diet, except for long-haired rats that form occasional plagues. In the Fortescue River region, the large red kangaroo and common wallaroo dominate the diet, as few smaller mammals are found in this area. On the Nullarbor Plain, rabbits and red kangaroos dominate the diet, and twice as much rabbit is eaten as red kangaroo. In the temperate mountains of eastern Australia, swamp wallaby and red-necked wallaby dominate the diet on the lower slopes and wombat on the higher slopes. Possums are commonly eaten here when found on the ground. In coastal regions, dingoes patrol the beaches for washed-up fish, seals, penguins, and other birds.

Dingoes drink about a litre of water each day in the summer and half a litre in winter. In arid regions during the winter, dingoes may live from the liquid in the bodies of their prey, as long as the number of prey is sufficient. In arid Central Australia, weaned pups draw most of their water from their food. There, regurgitation of water by the females for the pups was observed. During lactation, captive females have no higher need of water than usual, since they consume the urine and feces of the pups, thus recycling the water and keeping the den clean. Tracked dingoes in the Strzelecki Desert regularly visited water-points every 3–5 days, with two dingoes surviving 22 days without water during both winter and summer.

=== Hunting behaviour ===
Dingoes, dingo hybrids, and feral dogs usually attack from the rear as they pursue their prey. They kill their prey by biting the throat, which damages the trachea and the major blood vessels of the neck. The size of the hunting pack is determined by the type of prey targeted, with large packs formed to help hunt large prey. Large prey can include kangaroos, cattle, water buffalo, and feral horses. Dingoes will assess and target prey based on the prey's ability to inflict damage. Large kangaroos are the most commonly killed prey. The main tactic is to sight the kangaroo, bail it up, then kill it.

Dingoes typically hunt large kangaroos by having lead dingoes chase the quarry toward the paths of their pack mates, which are skilled at cutting corners in chases. The kangaroo becomes exhausted and is then killed. This same tactic is used by wolves, African wild dogs, and hyenas. Another tactic shared with African wild dogs is a relay pursuit until the prey is exhausted. A pack of dingoes is three times as likely to bring down a kangaroo than an individual because the killing is done by those following the lead chaser, which has also become exhausted.

Two patterns are seen for the final stage of the attack. An adult or juvenile kangaroo is nipped at the hamstrings of the hind legs to slow it before an attack to the throat. A small adult female or juvenile is bitten on the neck or back by dingoes running beside it. In one area of Central Australia, dingoes hunt kangaroos by chasing them into a wire fence, where they become temporarily immobilised.

The largest male red kangaroos tend to ignore dingoes, even when the dingoes are hunting the younger males and females. A large eastern grey kangaroo successfully fought off an attack by a single dingo that lasted over an hour. Wallabies are hunted in a similar manner to kangaroos, the difference being that a single dingo hunts using scent rather than sight and the hunt may last several hours.

Dingo packs may attack young cattle and buffalo, but very rarely healthy, grown adults. They focus on the sick or injured young. The tactics include harassing a mother with young, panicking a herd to separate the adults from the young, or watching a herd and looking for any unusual behaviour that might then be exploited.

One 1992 study in the Fortescue River region observed that cattle defend their calves by circling around the calves or aggressively charging dingoes. In one study of 26 approaches, 24 were by more than one dingo and only four resulted in calves being killed.

Dingoes often revisited carcasses. They did not touch fresh cattle carcasses until these were largely skin and bone, and even when these were plentiful, they still preferred to hunt kangaroos.

Of 68 chases of sheep, 26 sheep were seriously injured, but only eight were killed. However, in the area west of the Darling River, dingoes posed a problem for early pastoralists. The dingoes can outrun the sheep and the sheep were defenceless. However, the dingoes in general appeared not to be motivated to kill sheep, and in many cases just loped alongside the sheep before veering off to chase another sheep. For those that did kill and consume sheep, a large quantity of kangaroo was still in their diet, indicating once again a preference for kangaroo.

Lone dingoes can run down a rabbit, but are more successful by targeting kits near rabbit warrens. Dingoes take nestling birds, in addition to birds that are moulting and therefore cannot fly. Predators often use highly intelligent hunting techniques. Dingoes on Fraser Island have been observed using waves to entrap, tire, and help drown an adult swamp wallaby and an echidna. In the coastal wetlands of northern Australia, dingoes depend on magpie geese for a large part of their diet and a lone dingo sometimes distracts these while a white-breasted sea eagle makes a kill that is too heavy for it to carry off, with the dingo then driving the sea eagle away. They also scavenge on prey dropped from the nesting platforms of sea eagles. Lone dingoes may hunt small rodents and grasshoppers in grass by using their senses of smell and hearing, then pouncing on them with their forepaws.

=== Competitors ===
Dingoes and their hybrids co-exist with the native quoll. They also co-occur in the same territory as the introduced European red fox and feral cat, but little is known about the relationships among these three. Dingoes and their hybrids can drive off foxes from sources of water and occasionally eat feral cats. Dingoes can be killed by feral water buffalo and cattle goring and kicking them, from snake bite, and predation on their pups (and occasionally adults) by wedge-tailed eagles.

== Communication ==
Like all domestic dogs, dingoes tend towards phonetic communication. However, in contrast to domestic dogs, dingoes howl and whimper more, and bark less. Eight sound classes with 19 sound types have been identified.

=== Barking ===
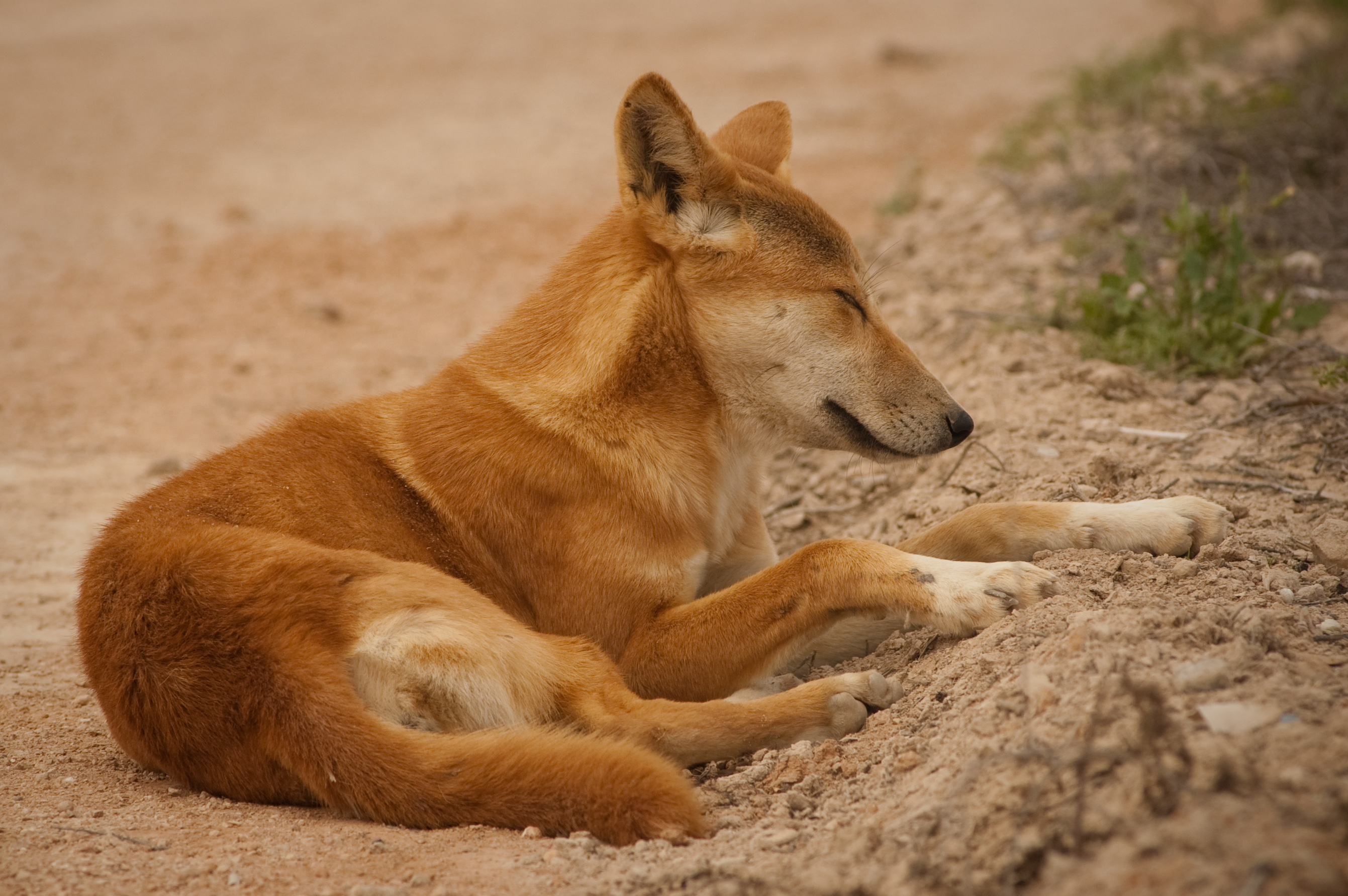
On the Nullarbor Plain

Compared to most domestic dogs, the bark of a dingo is short and monosyllabic, and is rarely used. Barking was observed to make up only 5% of vocalisations. Dog barking has always been distinct from wolf barking. Australian dingoes bark mainly in swooshing noises or in a mixture of atonal and tonal sounds. In addition, barking is almost exclusively used for giving warnings. Warn-barking in a homotypical sequence and a kind of "warn-howling" in a heterotypical sequence have also been observed. The bark-howling starts with several barks and then fades into a rising and ebbing howl and is probably (similar to coughing) used to warn the puppies and members of the pack. Additionally, dingoes emit a sort of "wailing" sound, which they mostly use when approaching a watering hole, probably to warn already present dingoes.

According to the present state of knowledge, getting Australian dingoes to bark more frequently by putting them in contact with other domestic dogs is not possible. However, German zoologist Alfred Brehm reported a dingo that learned the more "typical" form of barking and how to use it, while its brother did not. Whether dingoes bark or bark-howl less frequently in general is not certain.

=== Howling ===
Dingoes have three basic forms of howling (moans, bark-howls, and snuffs) with at least 10 variations. Usually, three kinds of howls are distinguished: long and persistent, rising and ebbing, and short and abrupt.

Observations have shown that each kind of howling has several variations, though their purpose is unknown. The frequency of howling varies with the season and time of day, and is also influenced by breeding, migration, lactation, social stability, and dispersal behaviour. Howling can be more frequent in times of food shortage, because the dogs become more widely distributed within their home range.

Additionally, howling seems to have a group function, and is sometimes an expression of joy (for example, greeting-howls). Overall, howling was observed less frequently in dingoes than among grey wolves. It may happen that one dog will begin to howl, and several or all other dogs will howl back and bark from time to time. In the wilderness, dingoes howl over long distances to attract other members of the pack, to find other dogs, or to keep intruders at bay. Dingoes howl in chorus with significant pitches, and with increasing number of pack members, the variability of pitches also increases. Therefore, dingoes are suspected to be able to measure the size of a pack without visual contact. Moreover, their highly variable chorus howls have been proposed to generate a confounding effect in the receivers by making pack size appear larger.

=== Other forms ===
Growling, making up about 65% of the vocalisations, is used in an agonistic context for dominance, and as a defensive sound. Similar to many domestic dogs, a reactive usage of defensive growling is only rarely observed. Growling very often occurs in combination with other sounds, and has been observed almost exclusively in swooshing noises (similar to barking).

During observations in Germany, dingoes were heard to produce a sound that observers have called Schrappen. It was only observed in an agonistic context, mostly as a defence against obtrusive pups or for defending resources. It was described as a bite intention, during which the receiver is never touched or hurt. Only a clashing of the teeth could be heard.

Aside from vocal communication, dingoes communicate, like all domestic dogs, via scent marking specific objects (for example, Spinifex) or places (such as waters, trails, and hunting grounds) using chemical signals from their urine, feces, and scent glands. Males scent mark more frequently than females, especially during the mating season. They also scent rub, whereby a dog rolls its neck, shoulders, or back on something that is usually associated with food or the scent markings of other dogs.

Unlike wolves, dingoes can react to social cues and gestures from humans.

== Behaviour ==
Dingoes tend to be nocturnal in warmer regions, but less so in cooler areas. Their main period of activity is around dusk and dawn, making them a crepuscular species in the colder climates. The periods of activity are short (often less than 1 hour) with short times of resting. Dingoes have two kinds of movement: a searching movement (apparently associated with hunting) and an exploratory movement (probably for contact and communication with other dogs). According to studies in Queensland, the wild dogs (dingo hybrids) there move freely at night through urban areas and cross streets and seem to get along quite well.

=== Social behaviour ===
The dingo's social behaviour is about as flexible as that of a coyote or grey wolf, which is perhaps one of the reasons the dingo was originally believed to have descended from the Indian wolf. While young males are often solitary and nomadic in nature, breeding adults often form a settled pack. However, in areas of the dingo's habitat with a widely spaced population, breeding pairs remain together, apart from others. Dingo distributions are a single dingo, 73%; two dingoes, 16%; three dingoes, 5%; four dingoes, 3%; and packs of five to seven dingoes, 3%. A dingo pack usually consists of a mated pair, their offspring from the current year, and sometimes offspring from the previous year.

Where conditions are favourable among dingo packs, the pack is stable with a distinct territory and little overlap between neighbours. The size of packs often appears to correspond to the size of prey available in the pack's territory. Desert areas have smaller groups of dingoes with a more loose territorial behaviour and sharing of the water sites. The average monthly pack size was noted to be between three and 12 members.

Similar to other canids, a dingo pack largely consists of a mated pair, their current year's offspring, and occasionally a previous year's offspring. Dominance hierarchies exist both between and within males and females, with males usually being more dominant than females. However, a few exceptions have been noted in captive packs. During travel, while eating prey, or when approaching a water source for the first time, the breeding male will be seen as the leader, or alpha. Subordinate dingoes approach a more dominant dog in a slightly crouched posture, ears flat, and tail down, to ensure peace in the pack. Establishment of artificial packs in captive dingoes has failed.

=== Reproduction ===
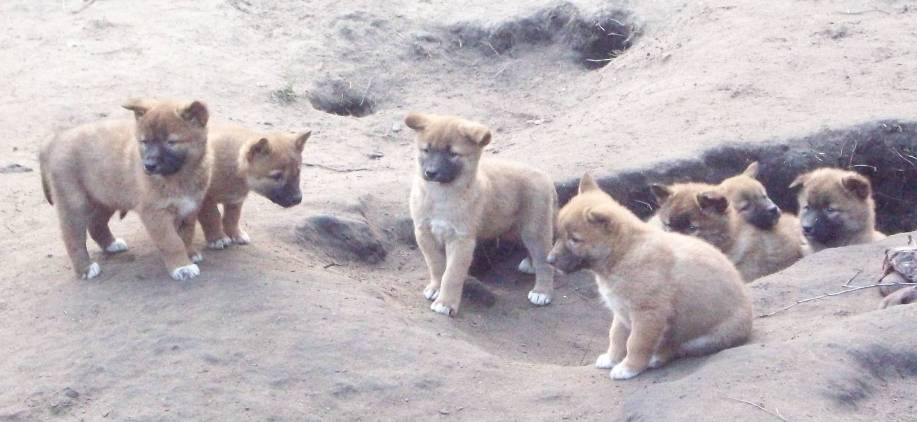
pups

Dingoes breed once annually, depending on the estrous cycle of the females, which according to most sources, only come in heat once per year. Dingo females can come in heat twice per year, but can only be pregnant once a year, with the second time only seeming to be pregnant.

Males are virile throughout the year in most regions, but have a lower sperm production during the summer in most cases. During studies on dingoes from the Eastern Highlands and Central Australia in captivity, no specific breeding cycle could be observed. All were potent throughout the year. The breeding was only regulated by the heat of the females. A rise in testosterone was observed in the males during the breeding season, but this was attributed to the heat of the females and copulation. In contrast to the captive dingoes, captured dingo males from Central Australia did show evidence of a male breeding cycle. Those dingoes showed no interest in females in heat (this time other domestic dogs) outside the mating season (January to July) and did not breed with them.

The mating season usually occurs in Australia between March and May (according to other sources between April and June). During this time, dingoes may actively defend their territories using vocalisations, dominance behaviour, growling, and barking.

Most females in the wild start breeding at the age of 2 years. Within packs, the alpha female tends to go into heat before subordinates and actively suppresses mating attempts by other females. Males become sexually mature between the ages of 1 and 3 years. The precise start of breeding varies depending on age, social status, geographic range, and seasonal conditions. Among dingoes in captivity, the pre-estrus was observed to last 10–12 days. However, the pre-estrus may last as long as 60 days in the wild.

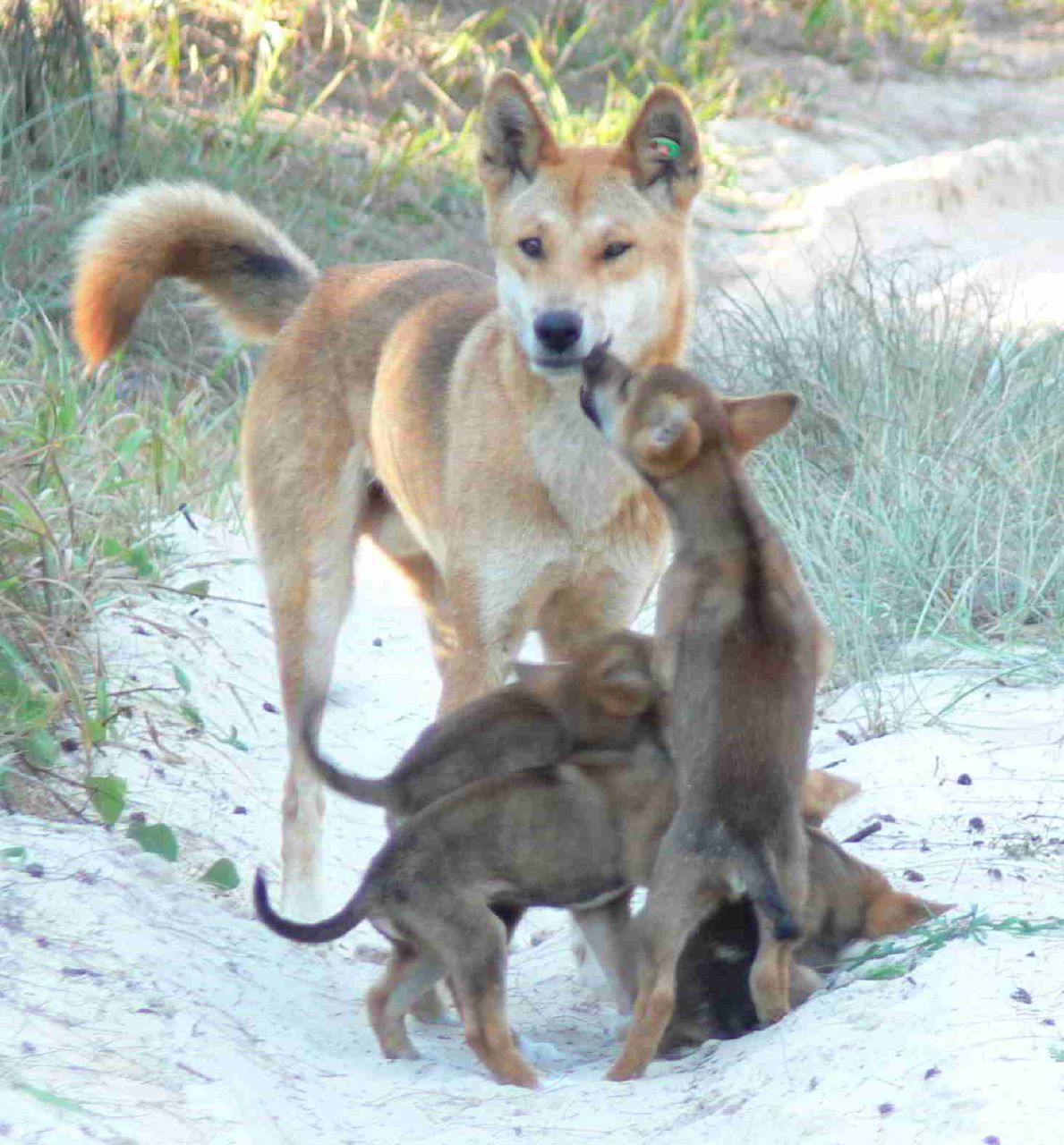
A male with his pups

In general, the only dingoes in a pack that successfully breed are the alpha pair, and the other pack members help with raising the pups. Subordinates are actively prevented from breeding by the alpha pair and some subordinate females have a false pregnancy. Low-ranking or solitary dingoes can successfully breed if the pack structure breaks up.

The gestation period lasts for 61–69 days and the size of the litter can range from 1 to 10 (usually 5) pups, with the number of males born tending to be higher than that of females. Pups of subordinate females usually get killed by the alpha female, which causes the population increase to be low even in good times. This behaviour possibly developed as an adaptation to the fluctuating environmental conditions in Australia. Pups are usually born between May and August (the winter period), but in tropical regions, breeding can occur at any time of the year.

At the age of 3 weeks, the pups leave the den for the first time, and leave it completely at 8 weeks. Dens are mostly underground. Reports exist of dens in abandoned rabbit burrows, rock formations, under boulders in dry creeks, under large spinifex, in hollow logs, and augmented burrows of monitor lizards and wombat burrows. The pups usually stray around the den within a radius of 3 km (2 mi), and are accompanied by older dogs during longer travels. The transition to consuming solid food is normally accomplished by all members of the pack during the age of 9 to 12 weeks. Apart from their own experiences, pups also learn through observation. Young dingoes usually become independent at the age of 3–6 months or they disperse at the age of 10 months, when the next mating season starts.

=== Migration ===
Dingoes usually remain in one area and do not undergo seasonal migrations. However, during times of famine, even in normally "safe" areas, dingoes travel into pastoral areas, where intensive, human-induced control measures are undertaken. In Western Australia in the 1970s, young dogs were found to travel for long distances when necessary. About 10% of the dogs captured—all younger than 12 months—were later recaptured far away from their first location. Among these, the average travelled distance for males was 21.7 km (13.5 mi) and for females 11 km (7 mi). Therefore, travelling dingoes had lower chances of survival in foreign territories, and they are apparently unlikely to survive long migrations through occupied territories. The rarity of long migration routes seemed to confirm this. During investigations in the Nullarbor Plain, even longer migration routes were recorded. The longest recorded migration route of a radio-collared dingo was about 24–32 km (15–20 mi).

=== Attacks on humans ===
Dingoes generally avoid conflict with humans, but they are large enough to be dangerous. Most attacks involve people feeding wild dingoes, particularly on K'gari (formerly Fraser Island), which is a special centre of dingo-related tourism. The vast majority of dingo attacks are minor in nature, but some can be major, and a few have been fatal: the death of two-month-old Azaria Chamberlain in the Northern Territory in 1980 is one of them.

== Impact ==
=== Ecological ===
==== Extinction of thylacines ====
Some researchers propose that the dingo caused the extirpation of the thylacine, the Tasmanian devil, and the Tasmanian native hen from mainland Australia because of the correlation in space and time with the dingo's arrival. Recent studies have questioned this proposal, suggesting that climate change and increasing human populations may have been the cause. Dingoes do not seem to have had the same ecological impact that invasive red foxes have in modern times. This might be connected to the dingo's way of hunting and the size of their favoured prey, as well as to the low number of dingoes in the time before European colonisation.

In 2017, a genetic study found that the population of the northwestern dingoes had commenced expanding since 4,000—6,000 years ago. This was proposed to be due either to their first arrival in Australia or to the commencement of the extinction of the thylacine, with the dingo expanding into the thylacine's former range.

==== Interactions with humans ====
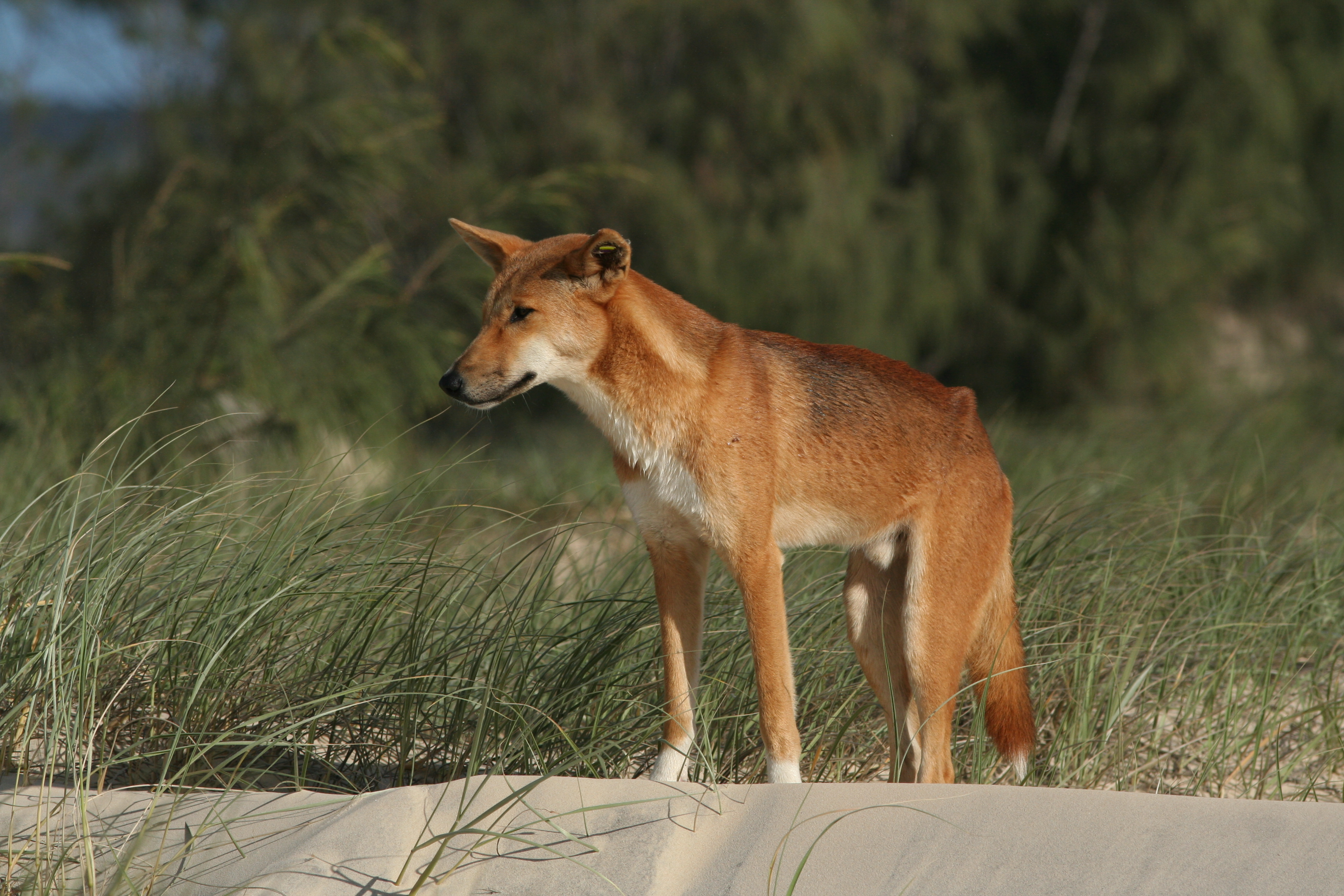
At K'gari (formerly Fraser Island), Queensland

The first British colonists who settled at Port Jackson, in 1788, recorded the dingo living with indigenous Australians, and later at Melville Island, in 1818. Furthermore, they were noted at the lower Darling and Murray rivers in 1862, indicating that the dingo was possibly semi-domesticated (or at least utilised in a "symbiotic" manner) by Aboriginal Australians. When livestock farming began expanding across Australia, in the early 19th century, dingoes began preying on sheep and cattle. Numerous population-control measures have been implemented since then, including a nation-wide fencing project, with only limited success.

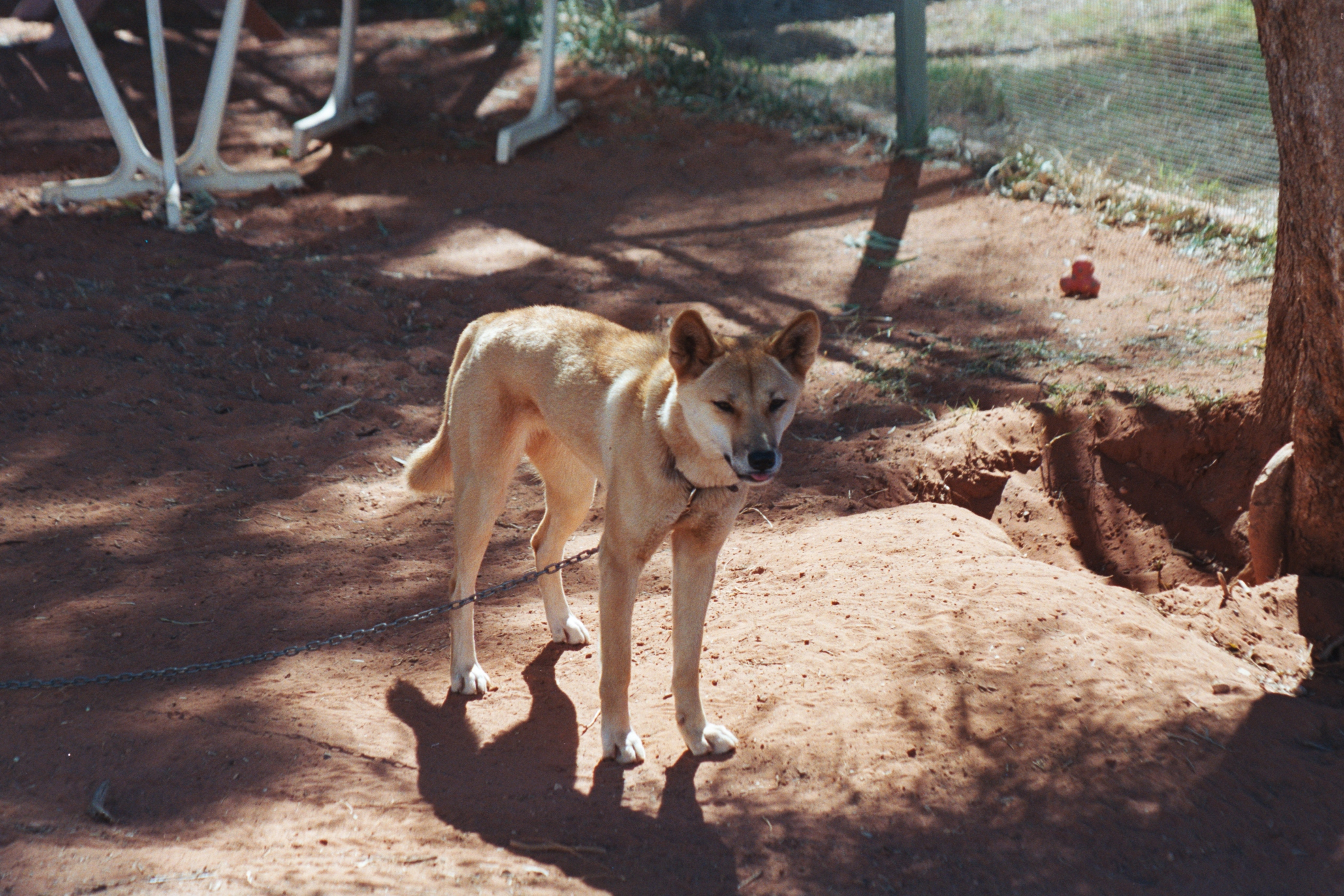
As a pet

Dingoes can be tame when they come in frequent contact with humans. Furthermore, some dingoes live with humans. Many Indigenous Australians and early European settlers lived alongside dingoes. Indigenous Australians would take dingo pups from the den and tame them until sexual maturity and the dogs would leave.

According to David Jenkins, a research fellow at Charles Sturt University, the breeding and reintroduction of pure dingoes is no easy option and, as of 2007, there were no studies that seriously dealt with this topic, especially in areas where dingo populations are already present.

==== Interactions with other animals ====
Much of the present place of dingoes in the Australian ecosystem, especially in the urban areas, remains unknown. Although the ecological role of dingoes in Northern and Central Australia is well understood, the same does not apply to the role of those in the east of the continent. In contrast to some claims, dingoes are assumed to have a positive impact on biodiversity in areas where feral foxes are present. Recently, the largest known population of critically endangered night parrots was discovered in an area kept free of introduced predators by dingoes. Dingoes have also been recorded regularly visiting the termite mound nests of another endangered species, the golden-shouldered parrot, with successful fledging of these parrots noted by researchers as evidence that dingoes actively drive other predators from the area.

Dingoes are regarded as apex predators and perform a key ecological function within the Australian continent. Increasingly, scientific evidence is proving they control the diversity of the ecosystem by limiting the population of prey species and keeping competition in check. Dingoes hunt feral livestock such as goats and pigs, as well as other introduced animals and native wildlife species. The low number of feral goats in Northern Australia is possibly caused by the presence of the dingoes, but whether they control the goats' numbers is still disputable. Studies from 1995 in the northern wet forests of Australia found the dingoes there did not reduce the number of feral pigs, but their predation only affects the pig population together with the presence of water buffaloes (which hinder the pigs' access to food).

Observations concerning the interaction between dingoes and populations of red fox and feral cats suggest dingoes limit the access of these predators to certain resources. As a result, a reduction in dingo population may cause an increase of red fox and feral cat numbers, and therefore, a higher pressure on native animals. These studies found the presence of dingoes is one of the factors that keep fox numbers in an area low, and therefore reduces pressure on native animals, which then do not disappear from the area. The countrywide numbers of red foxes are especially high where dingo numbers are low, but other factors might be responsible for this, depending on the area. Evidence was found for a competition between dingoes and red foxes in the Blue Mountains of New South Wales, since many overlaps occurred in the spectrum of preferred prey, but only evidence for local competition, not on a grand scale, was found.

Dingoes can coexist with red foxes and feral cats without reducing their numbers in areas with sufficient food resources (for example, high rabbit numbers) and hiding places. Very little is known about the relationships between dingoes and feral cats, except that both tend to live in the same areas. Although dingoes are also known to eat cats, whether this significantly affects the cat populations is unclear.

Additionally, the disappearance of dingoes might increase the prevalence of kangaroo, rabbit, and Australian brushturkey. In the areas outside the Dingo Fence, the number of emus is lower than in the areas inside. However, the numbers changed depending on the habitat. Since the environment is the same on both sides of the fence, the dingo appears to be a significant factor for the regulation of these species. Therefore, many conservationists suggest that dingo numbers should be allowed to increase, or dingoes reintroduced in areas with low dingo populations, to lower the pressure on endangered populations of native species and to aid reintroduction of these species in certain areas. In addition, the presence of the Australian brushturkey in Queensland increased significantly after dingo baiting was conducted.

The dingo's habitat covers most of Australia, but they are largely absent in the southeast and Tasmania, and an area in the southwest (see map). As Australia's largest extant terrestrial predators, dingoes prey on mammals up to the size of the large red kangaroo, in addition to the grey kangaroo, wombat, wallaby, quoll, possum and most other marsupials; they frequently pursue birds, lizards, fish, crabs, crayfish, eels, snakes, frogs, young crocodiles, larger insects, snails, carrion, human refuse, and sometimes fallen fruits or seeds.

Dingoes can also be of potential benefit to their environment, as they will hunt Australia's many introduced and invasive species. This includes human-introduced animals such as deer and their offspring (sambar, chital, and red deer) and water buffalo, in addition to the highly invasive rabbits, red foxes, feral and domestic cats, some feral dogs, sheep, and calves. Rarely, a pack of dingoes will pursue the larger and more dangerous dromedary camel, feral donkey, or feral horse; unattended young animals, or sick, weak, or elderly individuals are at greatest risk.

=== Cultural ===
Cultural opinions about the dingo are often based on its perceived "cunning", and the idea that it is an intermediate between civilisation and wildness.

Some of the early European settlers looked on dingoes as domestic dogs, while others thought they were more like wolves. Over the years, dingoes began to attack sheep, and their relationship to the Europeans changed very quickly; they were regarded as devious and cowardly, since they did not fight bravely in the eyes of the Europeans, and vanished into the bush. Additionally, they were seen as promiscuous or as devils with a venomous bite or saliva, so they could be killed unreservedly. Over the years, dingo trappers gained some prestige for their work, especially when they managed to kill hard-to-catch dingoes. Dingoes were associated with thieves, vagabonds, bushrangers, and parliamentary opponents. From the 1960s, politicians began calling their opponents "dingo", meaning they were cowardly and treacherous, and it has become a popular form of attack since then. Today, the word "dingo" still stands for "coward" and "cheat", with verb and adjective forms used, as well.

The image of the dingo has ranged among some groups from the instructive to the demonic.

Ceremonies (like a keen at the Cape York Peninsula in the form of howling) and dreamtime stories are connected to the dingo, which were passed down through the generations.

The dingo plays a prominent role in the Dreamtime stories of indigenous Australians, but it is rarely depicted in their cave paintings when compared with the extinct thylacine. One of the tribal elders of the people of the Yarralin, Northern Territory region tells that the Dreamtime dingo is the ancestor of both dingoes and humans. The dingoes "are what we would be if we were not what we are."

Similar to how Europeans acquired dingoes, the Aboriginal people of Australia acquired dogs from the immigrants very quickly. This process was so fast that Francis Barrallier (surveyor on early expeditions around the colony at Port Jackson) discovered in 1802 that five dogs of European origin were there before him. One theory holds that other domestic dogs adopt the role of the "pure" dingo. Introduced animals, such as the water buffalo and the domestic cat, have been adopted into the indigenous Aboriginal culture in the forms of rituals, traditional paintings, and dreamtime stories.

Most of the published myths originate from the Western Desert and show a remarkable complexity. In some stories, dingoes are the central characters, while in others, they are only minor ones. One time, an ancestor from the Dreamtime created humans and dingoes or gave them their current shape. Stories mention creation, socially acceptable behaviour, and explanations why some things are the way they are. Myths exist about shapeshifters (human to dingo or vice versa), "dingo-people", and the creation of certain landscapes or elements of those landscapes, like waterholes or mountains.

=== Economic ===
Livestock farming expanded across Australia from the early 1800s, which led to conflict between the dingo and graziers. Sheep, and to a lesser extent cattle, are an easy target for dingoes. The pastoralists and the government bodies that support this industry have shot, trapped, and poisoned dingoes or destroyed dingo pups in their dens. After two centuries of persecution, the dingo or dingo–dog hybrids can still be found across most of the continent.

Research on the real extent of the damage and the reason for this problem only started recently. Livestock can die from many causes, and when the carcass is found, determining with certainty the cause of death is often difficult. Since the outcome of an attack on livestock depends to a high degree on the behaviour and experience of the predator and the prey, only direct observation is certain to determine whether an attack was by dingoes or other domestic dogs. Even the existence of remnants of the prey in the scat of wild dogs does not prove they are pests, since wild dogs also eat carrion.

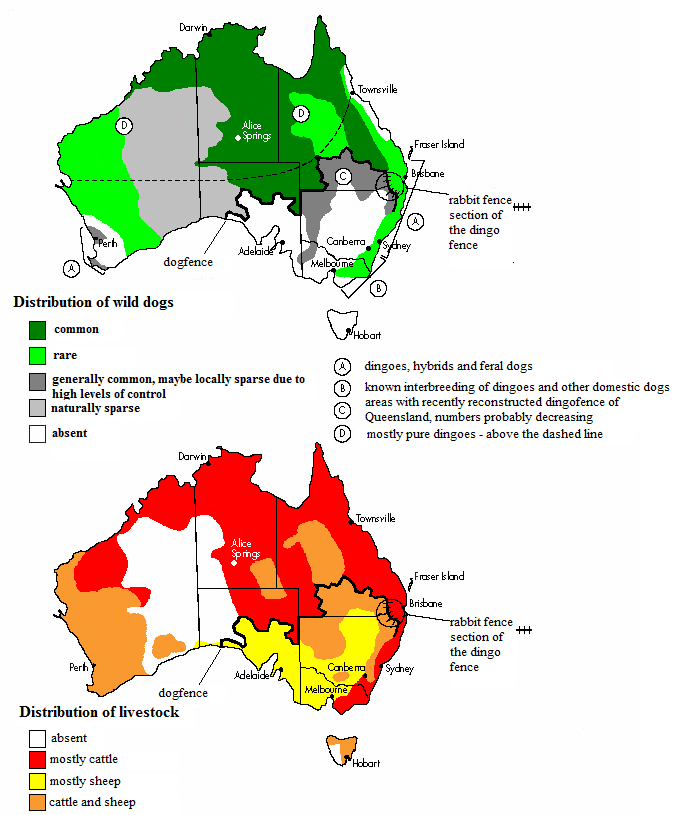
Distribution of wild dogs and livestock

The cattle industry can tolerate low to moderate, and sometimes high, numbers of wild dogs (therefore dingoes are not so easily regarded as pests in these areas). In the case of sheep and goats, a zero-tolerance attitude is common. The biggest threats are dogs that live inside or near the paddock areas. The extent of sheep loss is hard to determine due to the wide pasture lands in some parts of Australia.

In 2006, cattle losses in the Northern Territory rangeland grazing areas were estimated to be up to 30%.

Therefore, factors such as availability of native prey, as well as the defending behaviour and health of the cattle, play an important role in the number of losses. A study in Central Australia in 2003 confirmed that dingoes only have a low impact on cattle numbers when a sufficient supply of other prey (such as kangaroos and rabbits) is available. In some parts of Australia, the loss of calves is assumed to be minimised if horned cattle are used instead of polled. The precise economic impact is not known, and the rescue of some calves is unlikely to compensate for the necessary costs of control measures. Calves usually suffer less lethal wounds than sheep due to their size and the protection by adult cattle, so they have a higher chance of surviving an attack. As a result, the evidence of a dog attack may only be discovered after the cattle have been herded back into the enclosure, and signs such as bitten ears, tails, and other wounds are discovered.

The opinions of cattle owners regarding dingoes are more variable than those of sheep owners. Some cattle owners believe that the weakened mother losing her calf is better in times of drought so that she does not have to care for her calf, too. Therefore, these owners are more hesitant to kill dingoes. The cattle industry may benefit from the predation of dingoes on rabbits, kangaroos, and rats. Furthermore, the mortality rate of calves has many possible causes, and discriminating between them is difficult. The only reliable method to assess the damage would be to document all pregnant cows, then observe their development and those of their calves. The loss of calves in observed areas where dingoes were controlled was higher than in other areas. Loss of livestock is, therefore, not necessarily caused by the occurrence of dingoes and is independent from wild dogs. One researcher has stated that for cattle stations where dingoes were controlled, kangaroos were abundant, and this affects the availability of grass.

Domestic dogs are the only terrestrial predators in Australia that are big enough to kill fully grown sheep, and only a few sheep manage to recover from the severe injuries. In the case of lambs, death can have many causes apart from attacks by predators, which are blamed for the deaths because they eat from the carcasses. Although attacks by red foxes are possible, such attacks are more rare than previously thought. The fact that the sheep and goat industry is much more susceptible to damage caused by wild dogs than the cattle industry is mostly due to two factors – the flight behaviour of the sheep and their tendency to flock together in the face of danger, and the hunting methods of wild dogs, along with their efficient way of handling goats and sheep.

Therefore, the damage to the livestock industry does not correlate to the numbers of wild dogs in an area (except that no damage occurs where no wild dogs occur).

According to a report from the government of Queensland, wild dogs cost the state about $30 million annually due to livestock losses, the spread of diseases, and control measures. Losses for the livestock industry alone were estimated to be as high as $18 million. In Barcaldine, Queensland, up to one-fifth of all sheep are killed by dingoes annually, a situation which has been described as an "epidemic". According to a survey among cattle owners in 1995, performed by the Park and Wildlife Service, owners estimated their annual losses due to wild dogs (depending on the district) to be from 1.6% to 7.1%.

In 2018, a study in northern South Australia indicates that fetal/calf loss averages 18.6%, with no significant reduction due to dingo baiting. The calf losses did not correlate with increased dingo activity, and the cattle diseases pestivirus and leptospirosis were a major cause. Dingoes then scavenged on the carcasses. There was also evidence of dingo predation on calves.

Among the indigenous Australians, dingoes were also used as hunting aids, living hot water bottles, and camp dogs. Their scalps were used as a kind of currency, their teeth were traditionally used for decorative purposes, and their fur for traditional costumes.

Sometimes "pure" dingoes are important for tourism, when they are used to attract visitors. However, this seems to be common only on Fraser Island, where the dingoes are extensively used as a symbol to enhance the attraction of the island. Tourists are drawn to the experience of personally interacting with dingoes. Pictures of dingoes appear on brochures, many websites, and postcards advertising the island.

== Legal status ==
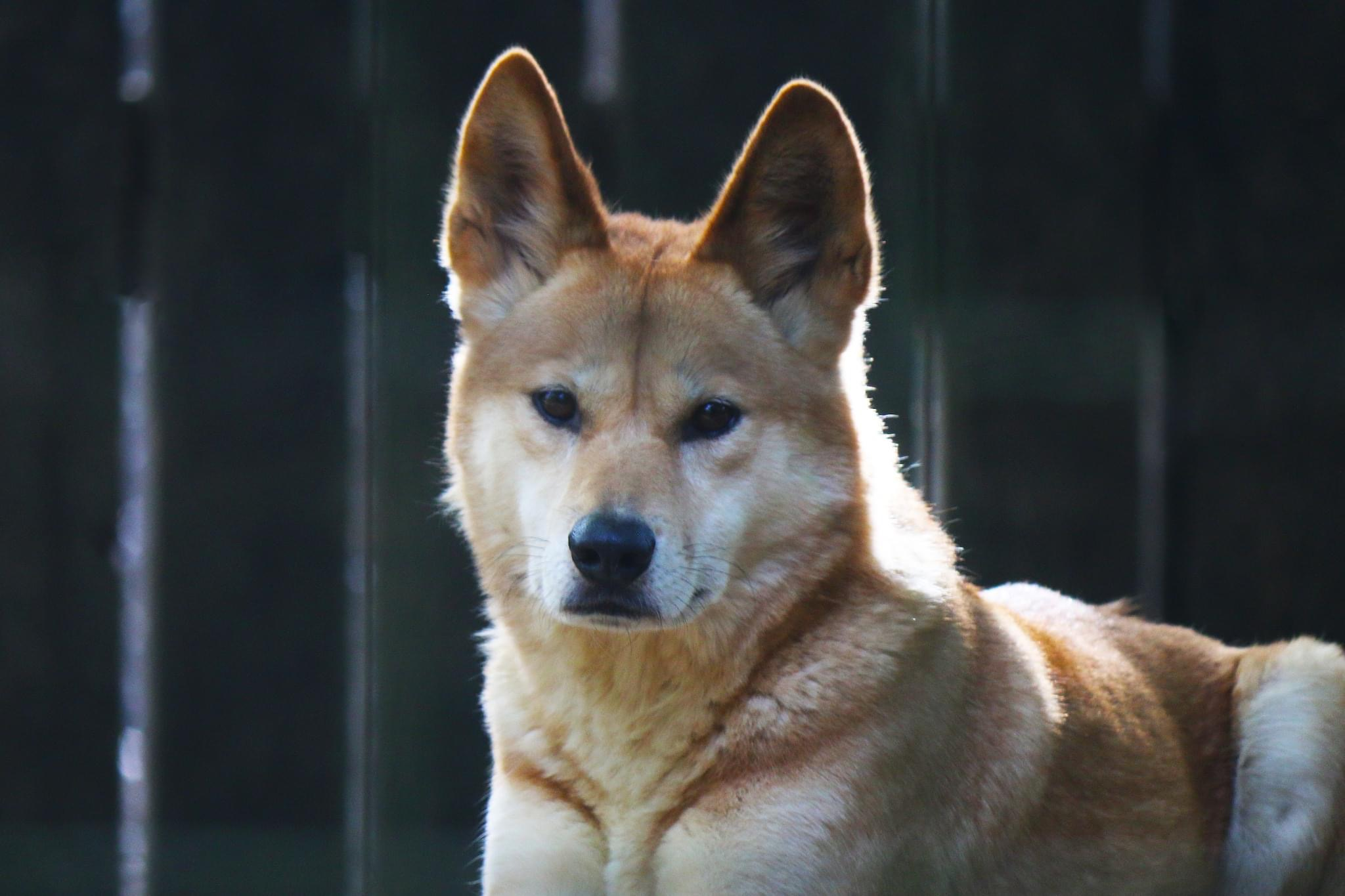
In a Maryland zoo

The dingo is recognised as a native animal under the laws of all Australian jurisdictions. Australia has over 500 national parks of which all but six are managed by the states and territories. As of 2017, the legal status of the dingo varies between these jurisdictions and in some instances it varies between different regions of a single jurisdiction. As of 2008 some of these jurisdictions classify dingoes as an invasive native.

- Australian government: Section 528 of the Environment Protection and Biodiversity Conservation Act 1999 defines a native species as one that was present in Australia before the year 1400. The dingo is protected in all Australian government managed national parks and reserves, World Heritage Areas, and other protected areas.
- Australian Capital Territory: The dingo is listed as a "pest animal" outside national parks and reserves in the Pest Plants and Animals (Pest Animals) Declaration 2016 (No 1) made under the Pest Plants and Animals Act 2005, which calls for a management plan for pest animals. The Nature Conservation Act 2014 protects native animals in national parks and reserves but excludes this protection to "pest animals" declared under the Pest Plants and Animals Act 2005.
- New South Wales: The dingo falls under the definition of "wildlife" under the National Parks and Wildlife Act 1974 however it also becomes "unprotected fauna" under Schedule 11 of the act. The Wild Dog Destruction Act (1921) applies only to the western division of the state and includes the dingo in its definition of "wild dogs". The act requires landowners to destroy any wild dogs on their property and any person owning a dingo or half-bred dingo without a permit faces a fine. In other parts of the state, dingoes can be kept as pets under the Companion Animals Act 1998 as a dingo is defined under this act as a "dog". The dingo has been proposed for listing under the Threatened Species Conservation Act because it is argued that these dogs had established populations before the arrival of Europeans, but no decision has been made.
- Northern Territory: The dingo is a "vertebrate that is indigenous to Australia" and therefore "protected wildlife" under the Territory Parks and Wildlife Conservation Act 2014. A permit is required for all matters dealing with protected wildlife.
- Queensland: The dingo is listed as "least concern wildlife" in the Nature Conservation (Wildlife) Regulation 2006 under the Nature Conservation Act 1992, therefore the dingo is protected in National Parks and conservation areas. The dingo is listed as a "pest" in the Land Protection (Pest and Stock Route Management) Regulation 2003 under the Land Protection (Pest and Stock Route Management) Act 2002, which requires land owners to take reasonable steps to keep their lands free of pests.
- South Australia: The National Parks and Wildlife Act 1972 defines a protected animal as one that is indigenous to Australia but then lists the dingo as an "unprotected species" under Schedule 11. The purpose of the Dog Fence Act 1946 is to prevent wild dogs entering into the pastoral and agricultural areas south of the dog-proof fence. The dingo is listed as a "wild dog" under this act, and landowners are required to maintain the fence and destroy any wild dog within the vicinity of the fence by shooting, trapping or baiting. The dingo is listed as an "unprotected species" in the Natural Resources Management Act 2004, which allows landowners to lay baits "to control animals" on their land just north of the dog fence.
- Tasmania: Tasmania does not have a native dingo population. The dingo is listed as a "restricted animal" in the Nature Conservation Act 2002 and cannot be imported without a permit. Once imported into Tasmania, a dingo is listed as a dog under the Dog Control Act 2000.
- Victoria: The dingo is a "vertebrate taxon" that is "indigenous" to Australia and therefore "wildlife" under the Wildlife Act 1975, which protects wildlife. The act mandates that a permit is required to keep a dingo, and that this dingo must not be cross-bred with a dog. The act allows an order to be made to unprotect dingoes in certain areas of the state. The Order in Council made on the 28 September 2010 includes the far north-west of the state and all of the state north-east of Melbourne. It was made to protect stock on private land. The order allows dingoes to be trapped, shot or baited by any person on private land in these regions, while protecting the dingo on state-owned land.
- Western Australia: Dingoes are considered as "unprotected" native fauna under the Western Australian Wildlife Conservation Act. The dingo is recorded as a "declared pest" on the Western Australian Organism List. This list records those species that have been declared as pests under the Biosecurity and Agriculture Management Act 2007, and these are regarded as pests across all of Western Australia. Landowners must take the prescribed measures to deal with declared pests on their land. The policy of the WA government is to promote eradication of dingoes in the livestock grazing areas but leave them undisturbed in the rest of the state.

== Control measures ==
Dingo attacks on livestock led to widescale efforts to repel them from areas with intensive agricultural usage, and all states and territories have enacted laws for the control of dingoes. In the early 20th century, fences were erected to keep dingoes away from areas frequented by sheep, and a tendency to routinely eradicate dingoes developed among some livestock owners. Established methods for the control of dingoes in sheep areas entailed the employment of specific workers on every property. The job of these people (who were nicknamed "doggers") was to reduce the number of dingoes by using steel traps, baits, firearms and other methods. The responsibility for the control of wild dogs lay solely in the hands of the landowners. At the same time, the government was forced to control the number of dingoes. As a result, a number of measures for the control of dingoes developed over time. It was also considered that dingoes travel over long distances to reach areas with richer prey populations, and the control methods were often concentrated along "paths" or "trails" and in areas that were far away from sheep areas. All dingoes were regarded as a potential danger and were hunted.

=== Guardian animals ===
To protect livestock, livestock guardian dogs (for example, Maremmas), donkeys, alpacas and llamas are used.

=== Dingo Fence ===
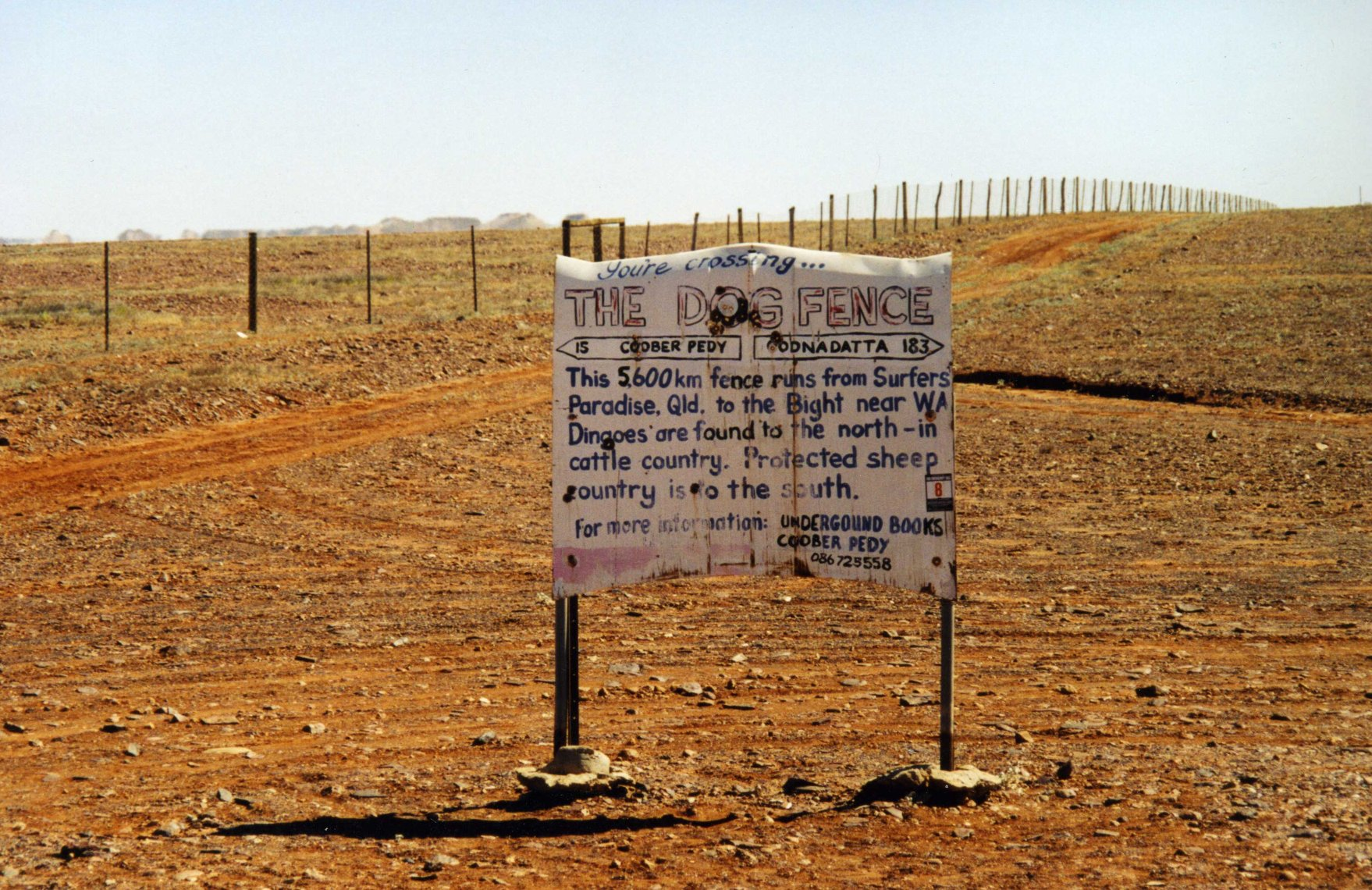
A part of the Dingo Fence

In the 1920s, the Dingo Fence was erected on the basis of the Wild Dog Act (1921) and, until 1931, thousands of miles of Dingo Fences had been erected in several areas of South Australia. In the year 1946, these efforts were directed to a single goal, and the Dingo Fence was finally completed. The fence connected with other fences in New South Wales and Queensland. The main responsibilities in maintaining the Dingo Fence still lies with the landowners whose properties border on the fence and who receive financial support from the government.

=== Reward system ===
A reward system (local, as well from the government) was active from 1846 to the end of the 20th century, but there is no evidence that – despite the billions of dollars spent – it was ever an efficient control method. Therefore, its importance declined over time.

Dingo scalping commenced in 1912 with the passage of the Wild Dogs Act by the government of South Australia. In an attempt to reduce depredation on livestock, that government offered a bounty for dingo skins, and this program was later repeated in Western Australia and the Northern Territory. One writer argues that this new legislation and economic driver had significant impacts on Aboriginal society in the region. This act was followed by updates and amendments, including 1931, 1938, and 1948.

=== Poisoning ===
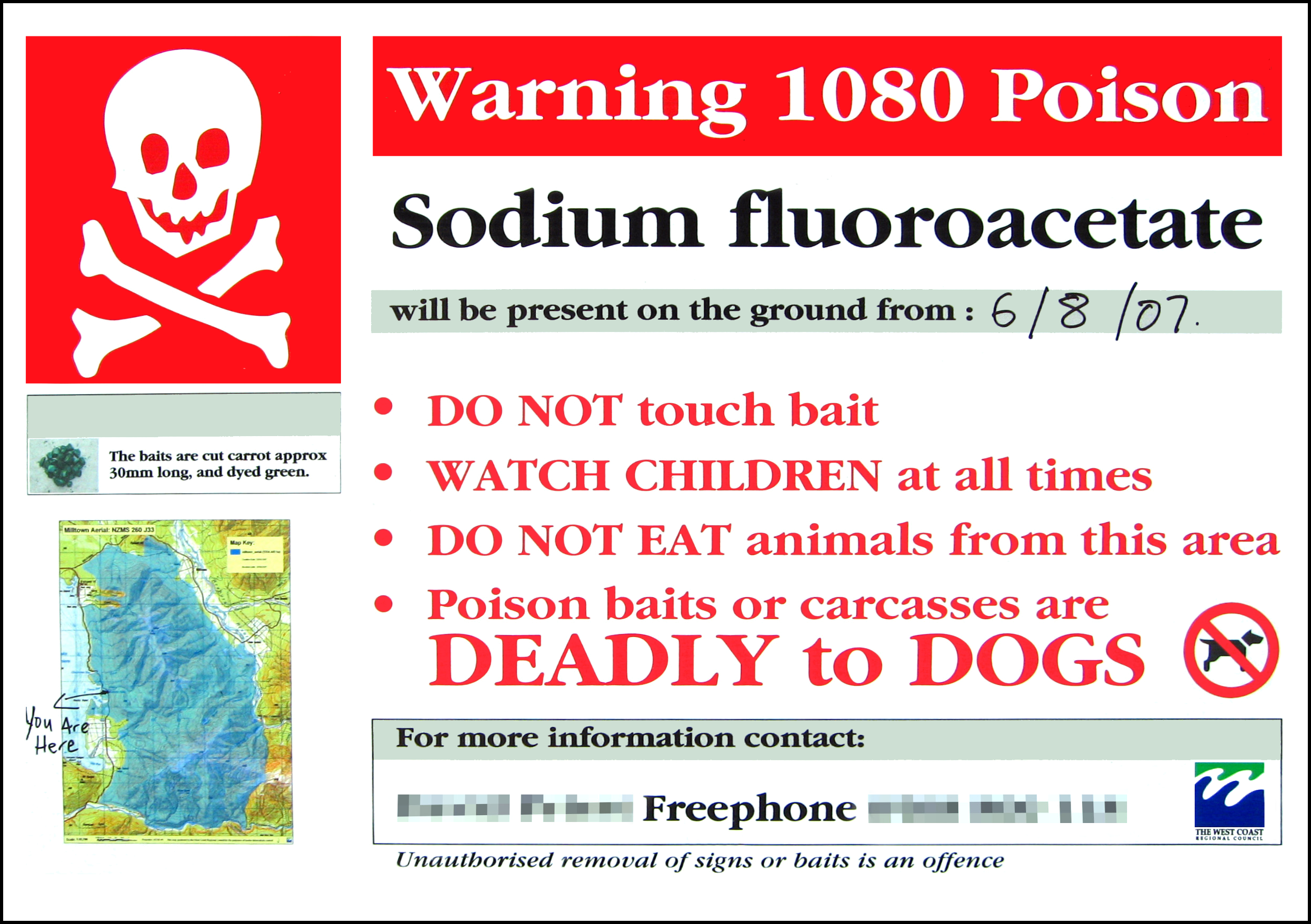
Warning of poisonous sodium fluoroacetate baits

Baits with the poison 1080 are regarded as the fastest and safest method for dog control, since they are extremely susceptible. Even small amounts of poison per dog are sufficient (0.3 mg per kg). The application of aerial baiting is regulated in the Commonwealth by the Civil Aviation Regulations (1988). The assumption that the tiger quoll might be damaged by the poison led to the dwindling of areas where aerial baiting could be performed. In areas where aerial baiting is no longer possible, it is necessary to put down baits.

From 2004, cyanide-ejectors and protection collars (filled with 1080 on certain spots) have been tested.

In 2016, controversy surrounded a plan to inject a population of dingoes on Pelorus Island, off the coast of northern Queensland, Australia, with pills that would release a fatal dose of 1080 poison two years after the dingoes were to be intentionally released to help eradicate goats. The dingoes were dubbed 'death-row dingoes', and the plan was blocked due to concerns for a locally threatened shorebird.

=== Neutering ===
Owners of dingoes and other domestic dogs are sometimes asked to neuter their pets and keep them under observation to reduce the number of stray/feral dogs and prevent interbreeding with dingoes.

=== Efficiency of measures ===
The efficiency of control measures was questioned in the past and is often questioned today, as well as whether they stand in a good cost-benefit ratio. The premium system proved to be susceptible to deception and to be useless on a large scale, and can therefore only be used for getting rid of "problem-dogs". Animal traps are considered inhumane and inefficient on a large scale, due to the limited efficacy of baits. Based on studies, it is assumed that only young dogs that would have died anyway can be captured. Furthermore, wild dogs are capable of learning and sometimes are able to detect and avoid traps quite efficiently. In one case, a dingo bitch followed a dogger and triggered his traps one after another by carefully pushing her paw through the sand that covered the trap.

== Conservation of purebreds ==
Until 2004, the dingo was categorised as of "least concern" on the Red List of Threatened Species. In 2008, it was recategorised as "vulnerable", following the decline in numbers to around 30% of "pure" dingoes, due to crossbreeding with domestic dogs. In 2018, the IUCN regarded the dingo as a feral dog and discarded it from the Red List. The current population of dingoes is unknown, with the IUCN red list listing it as "Not Evaluated".

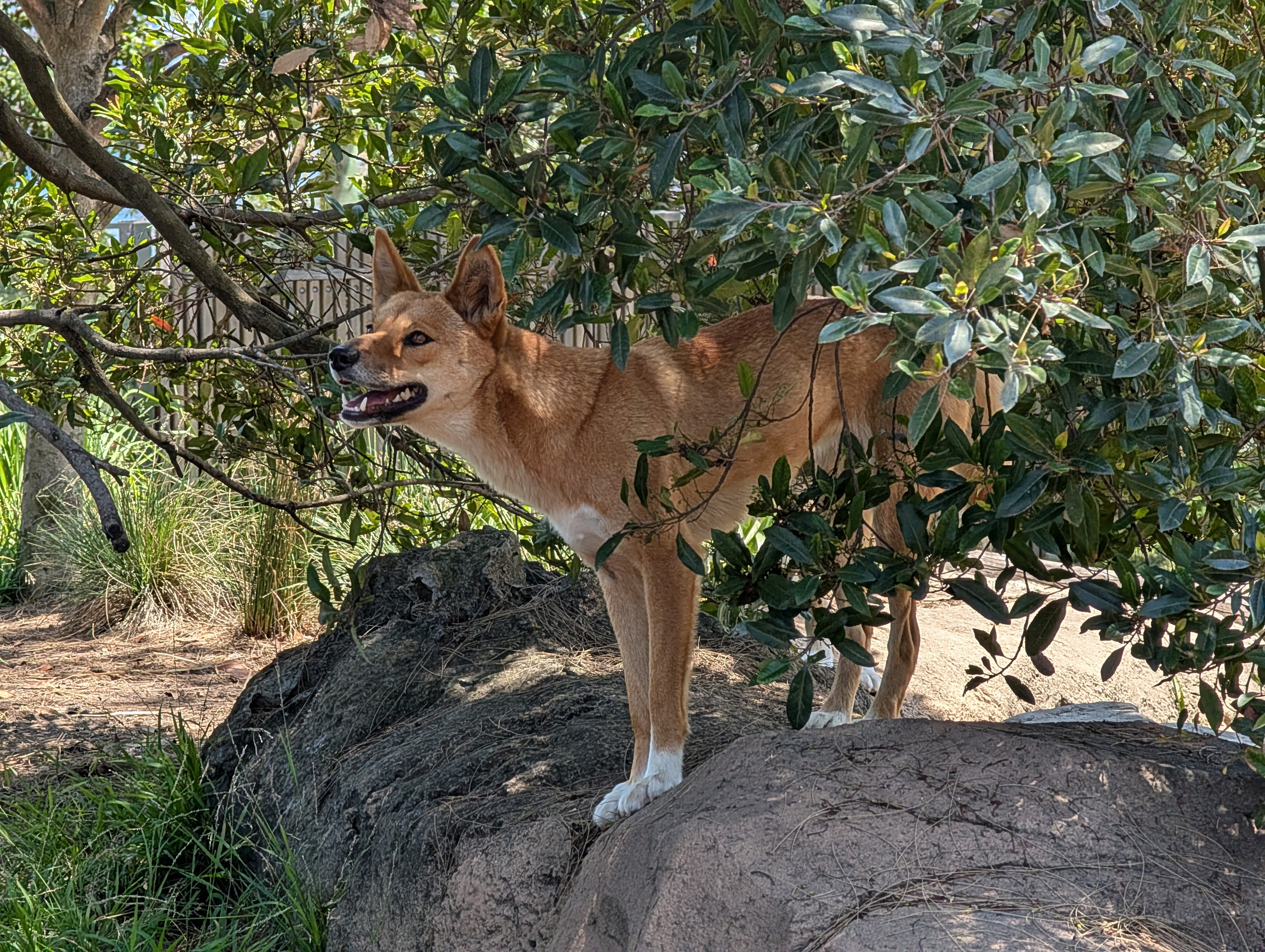
At Taronga Zoo, Sydney, Australia

Dingoes are reasonably abundant in large parts of Australia, but there is some argument that they are endangered due to interbreeding with other dogs in many parts of their range. Dingoes receive varying levels of protection in conservation areas such as national parks and natural reserves in New South Wales, the Northern Territory and Victoria, Arnhem Land and other Aboriginal lands, UNESCO World Heritage Sites, and the whole of the Australian Capital Territory. In some states, dingoes are regarded as declared pests and landowners are allowed to control the local populations. Throughout Australia, all other wild dogs are considered pests.

=== Specific populations ===
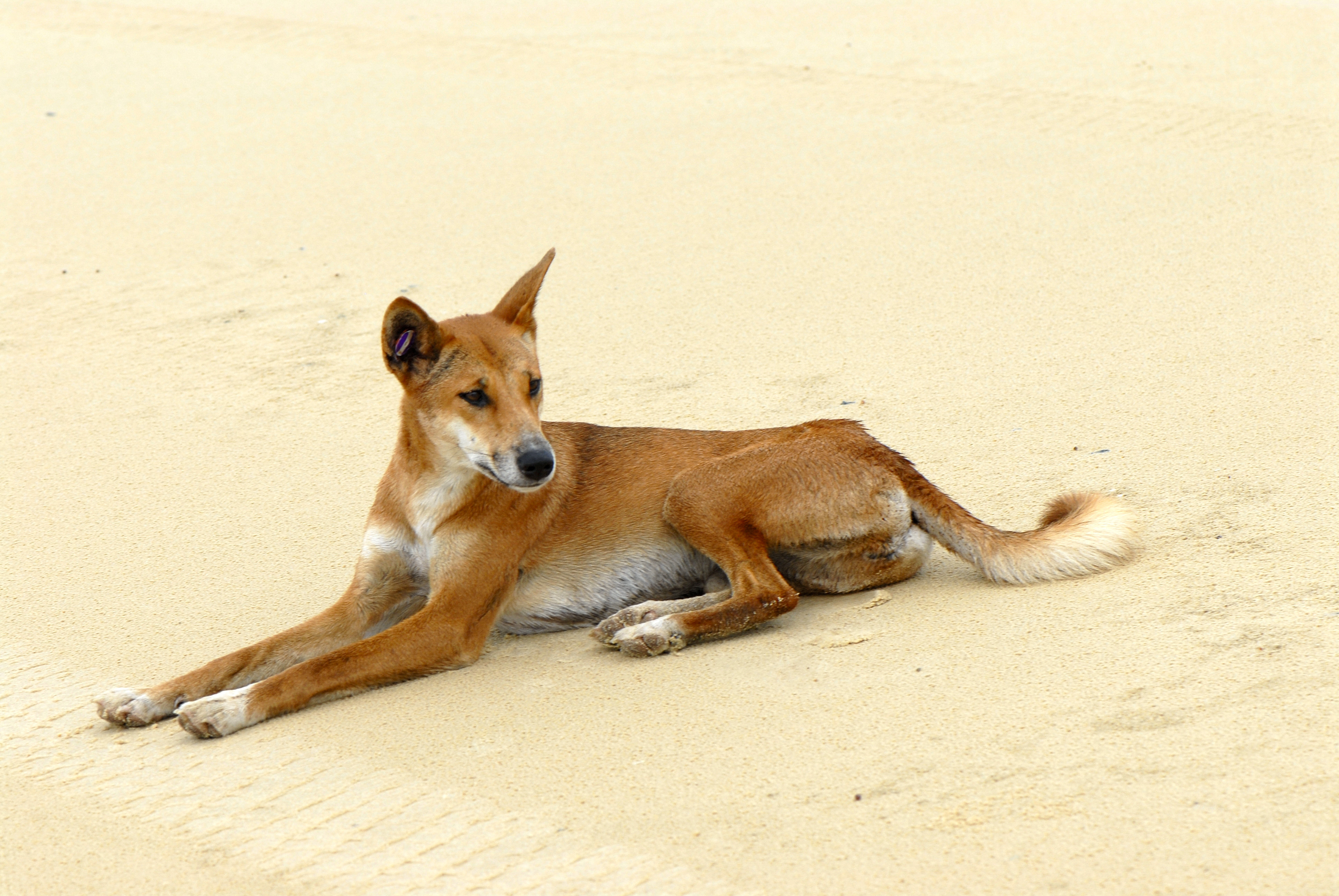
Female with a tagged ear on K'gari (formerly Fraser Island)

==== K'gari ====
K'gari is a 1,840 km^{2} (710 sq mi) World Heritage Site located off Australia's eastern coast. The island is home to a genetically distinct population of dingoes that are free of dog introgression, estimated to number 120 as of 2017. These dingoes are unique because they are closely related to the southeastern dingoes but share a number of genes with the New Guinea singing dog and show some evidence of admixture with the northwestern dingoes. Known as wongari by the Butchulla people, they have a significant place in the culture of the traditional owners of the island, who want to see them protected. Because of their conservation value, in February 2013, a report on dingo management strategies on the island was released, with options that included ending the intimidation of dingoes, tagging practice changes and regular veterinarian checkups, as well as a permanent dingo sanctuary on the island. According to DNA examinations from 2004, the dingoes of K'gari are "pure", as opposed to dingo–dog hybrids. However, skull measurements from the mid-1990s had a different result.

==== Wilkerr ====
There is a population of genetically distinct and geographically isolated dingoes in north-western Victoria, known as "Big Desert dingoes" or Wilkerr (meaning dingo in the Wergaia language of the Wotjobaluk Nations, for whom they have cultural significance). Having become isolated during the colonisation of Australia, they now inhabit the Big Desert, Wyperfeld, and Ngarkat protected areas. The size and isolation has led to inbreeding and associated health issues. In March 2024 the Victorian Government passed legislation to protect the dingoes. The Big Desert Dingo Research, Australian Dingo Foundation, and the Dingo Conservancy have made submissions to the Threatened Species Scientific Committee to consider the population as critically endangered, leading to fears by farmers over the border in South Australia that the population could grow quickly and pose a threat to their sheep.

==== Tanami Desert ====
A 2013 study showed that dingoes living in the Tanami Desert are among the "purest" in Australia.

=== Dingo conservation research ===
Groups that have devoted themselves to the conservation of the "pure" dingo by using breeding programs include the Australian Native Dog Conservation Society and the Australian Dingo Conservation Association. Presently, the efforts of the dingo conservation groups are considered to be ineffective because most of their dogs are untested or are known to be hybrids.

Conservation of pure and survivable dingo populations is promising in remote areas, where contact with humans and other domestic dogs is rare. Under New South Wales state policy in parks, reserves and other areas not used by agriculture, these populations are only to be controlled when they pose a threat to the survival of other native species. The introduction of "dog-free" buffer zones around areas with pure dingoes is regarded as a realistic method to stop interbreeding. This is enforced to the extent that all wild dogs can be killed outside the conservation areas. However, studies from 2007 indicate that even an intensive control of core areas is probably not able to stop the process of interbreeding.

According to the Dingo Discovery Sanctuary and Research Centre in 2018, many studies were finding a case for the re-introduction of the dingo into previously occupied areas in order to return some balance to badly degraded areas as a result of "unregulated and ignorant farming practices".

Dingo densities have been measured at up to 3 per square kilometre (0.8/sq mi) in both the Guy Fawkes River region of New South Wales and in South Australia at the height of a rabbit plague.

=== Hybridisation ===
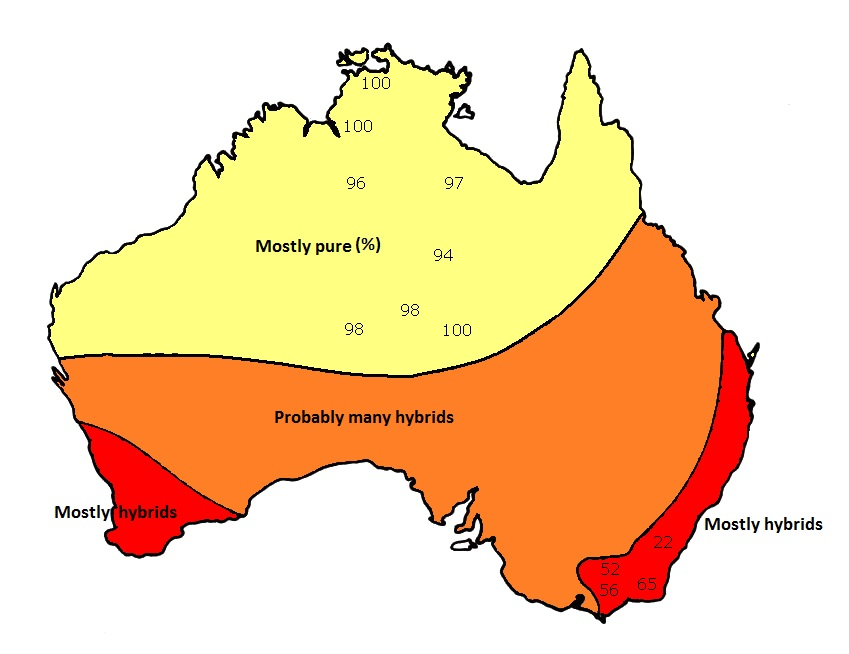
Broad distribution map of dingoes and dingo–dog hybrids showing percent purity

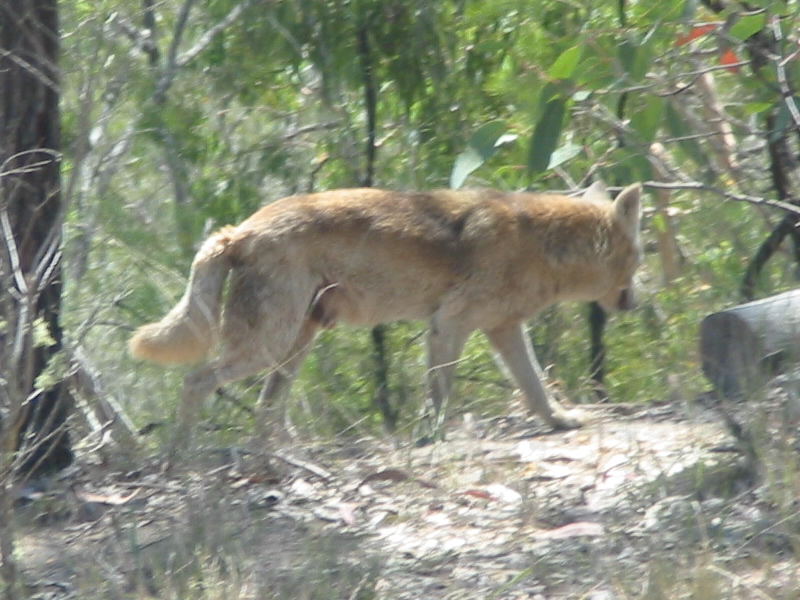
Wild dog with atypical colouration, possibly a hybrid

In 2023, a study of 402 wild and captive dingoes using 195,000 points across the dingo genome indicates that past studies of hybridisation were over-estimated and that pure dingoes are more common than they were originally thought to be. Dingoes according to the study were found to exist in four genetically distinct populations; previous studies assumed there was only one type of dingo, and that therefore any differences between dingoes across the country was due to hybridisation—when it was found that it is actually because there are different types of dingoes.

In 2021, DNA testing of over 5,000 wild-living canines from across Australia found that 31 were feral domestic dogs and 27 were first-generation hybrids. This finding challenges the perception that dingoes are nearly extinct and have been replaced by feral domestic dogs.

Coat colour cannot be used to distinguish hybrids. Dingo-like domestic dogs and dingo-hybrids can be generally distinguished by the more dog-typical kind of barking that exists among the hybrids, and differences in the breeding cycle, certain skull characteristics, and genetic analyses can be used for differentiation. Despite all the characteristics that can be used for distinguishing between dingoes and other domestic dogs, there are two problems that should not be underestimated. First, there is no real clarity regarding at what point a dog is regarded as a "pure" dingo, and, secondly, no distinguishing feature is completely reliable—it is not known which characteristics permanently remain under the conditions of natural selection.

There are two main opinions regarding this process of interbreeding. The first, and likely most common, position states that the "pure" dingo should be preserved via strong controls of the wild dog populations, and only "pure" or "nearly-pure" dingoes should be protected. The second position is relatively new and is of the opinion that people must accept that the dingo has changed and that it is impossible to bring the "pure" dingo back. Conservation of these dogs should therefore be based on where and how they live, as well as their cultural and ecological role, instead of concentrating on precise definitions or concerns about "genetic purity". Both positions are controversially discussed.

Due to this interbreeding, there is a wider range of fur colours, skull shapes and body size in the modern-day wild dog population than in the time before the arrival of the Europeans. Over the course of the last 40 years, there has been an increase of about 20% in the average wild dog body size. It is currently unknown whether, in the case of the disappearance of "pure" dingoes, remaining hybrids would alter the predation pressure on other animals. It is also unclear what kind of role these hybrids would play in the Australian ecosystems. However, it is unlikely that the dynamics of the various ecosystems will be excessively disturbed by this process.

In 2011, a total of 3,941 samples were included in the first continent-wide DNA study of wild dogs. The study found that 46% were pure dingoes which exhibited no dog alleles (gene expressions). There was evidence of hybridisation in every region sampled. In Central Australia only 13% were hybrids; however, in southeastern Australia 99% were hybrids or feral dogs. Pure dingo distribution was 88% in the Northern Territory, intermediate numbers in Western Australia, South Australia and Queensland, and 1% in New South Wales and Victoria. Almost all wild dogs showed some dingo ancestry, with only 3% of dogs showing less than 80% dingo ancestry. This indicates that domestic dogs have a low survival rate in the wild or that most hybridisation is the result of roaming dogs that return to their owners. No populations of feral dogs have been found in Australia.

In 2016, a three dimensional geometric morphometric analysis of the skulls of dingoes, dogs and their hybrids found that dingo–dog hybrids exhibit morphology closer to the dingo than to the parent group dog. Hybridisation did not push the unique Canis dingo cranial morphology towards the wolf phenotype, therefore hybrids cannot be distinguished from dingoes based on cranial measures. The study suggests that the wild dingo morphology is dominant when compared with the recessive dog breed morphology, and concludes that although hybridisation introduces dog DNA into the dingo population, the native cranial morphology remains resistant to change.

Research has also suggested that lethal management strategies such as aerial 1080 baiting, particularly during the dingo breeding season, increases the risk of dingo x dog hybridisation by fracturing social structures and reducing the availability of dingo mates. Like all wolf species, dingoes are highly territorial and aggressive, and it is with great difficulty that outsiders join stable packs thus under natural conditions genetic lines are protected through kin selection, and genetic variation within packs may be small due to inbreeding and aggressive behavior towards outsiders, nevertheless Dingo control increases the number of floaters which are more likely to breed with dogs. Similarly, hybridization between wolves and dogs has been reported to exist in great numbers from Latvia where wolf-hunting was common.

A 2026 genomic survey of more than 300 free-roaming canines across Australia found that the animals carried an average of 11.7% domestic dog ancestry, leading the authors to conclude that “the vast majority of free-roaming canines in Australia are overwhelmingly dingo”.

== See also ==
- Domesticated plants and animals of Austronesia
- Indian pariah dog
- Carolina Dog
