= Threatened Species Scientific Committee =

Australian environmentalist advisory committee

The Threatened Species Scientific Committee provides advice to the Australian federal environment minister on the amendment and updating of lists for threatened species, threatened ecological communities, and key threatening processes and the development or adoption of recovery plans and threat abatement plans. It is established under the Environment Protection and Biodiversity Conservation Act 1999. In 2011, Professor Helene Marsh, a conservation biologist of over 30 years experience was appointed chair of the committee. Her predecessor, Associate Professor Robert J. S. 'Bob' Beeton, vacated the position after holding it for 11 years. The committee has 10 seats, and positions on the committee are paid. As of 2015, the committee is without a chair, and has several vacancies.

== Membership ==
As of February 8, 2015, the committee members are:

- Ms Judy Backhouse - Victoria
- Professor Stuart Bunn - Queensland
- Professor Peter Harrison - New South Wales
- Professor David Keith - New South Wales
- Dr Sarah Legge - Western Australia
- Dr Sue Mcintyre - ACT / New South Wales

There are vacancies for three additional members and a chairperson.
