= Victoria (state) =

State of Australia

- State
- Flag Coat of arms
- Nicknames: The Garden State • The Education State
- Motto: "Peace and Prosperity"
- Location of Victoria in Australia; Coordinates: 36°51′15″S 144°16′52″E
- Country: Australia
- Before federation: Colony of Victoria
- Separation from New South Wales: 1 July 1851
- Responsible government: 23 November 1855
- Federation: 1 January 1901
- Named after: Queen Victoria
- Capital and largest city: Melbourne; 37°48′51″S 144°57′47″E
- Administration: 79 local government areas
- Demonym(s): Victorian
- Government: Federated parliamentary constitutional monarchy
  - Monarch: Charles III
  - Governor: Margaret Gardner
  - Premier: Ben Carroll (ALP)
  - Chief Justice: Richard Niall
- Legislature: Parliament of Victoria
  - Upper house: Legislative Council
  - Lower house: Legislative Assembly
- Judiciary: Supreme Court of Victoria

Parliament of Australia
  - Senate: 12 senators (of 76)
  - House of Representatives: 38 seats (of 150)

Area
  - Total: 227,444 km^{2} (87,817 sq mi) (6th)
- Highest elevation (Mount Bogong): 1,986 m (6,516 ft)

Population
  - 2026-03 estimate: ▲7,154,221 (2nd)
  - Density: 31.5/km^{2} (81.6/sq mi) (2nd)
- GSP: 2020 estimate
  - Total: ▲AU$458.895 billion (2nd)
  - Per capita: ▲AU$68,996 (6th)
- HDI (2023): ▲0.954 very high · 4th
- Time zone: UTC+10:00 (AEST)
  - Summer (DST): UTC+11:00 (AEDT)
- Calling code: +61 (03)
- Postal abbreviation: VIC
- ISO 3166 code: AU–VIC
- Symbols
- Bird: Helmeted honeyeater (Lichenostomus melanops cassidix)
- Fish: Weedy seadragon (Phyllopteryx taeniolatus)
- Flower: Common heath (Epacris impressa)
- Mammal: Leadbeater's possum (Gymnobelideus leadbeateri)
Colour(s)
Navy blue and silver
- Fossil: Koolasuchus cleelandi
- Mineral: Gold
- Website: vic.gov.au

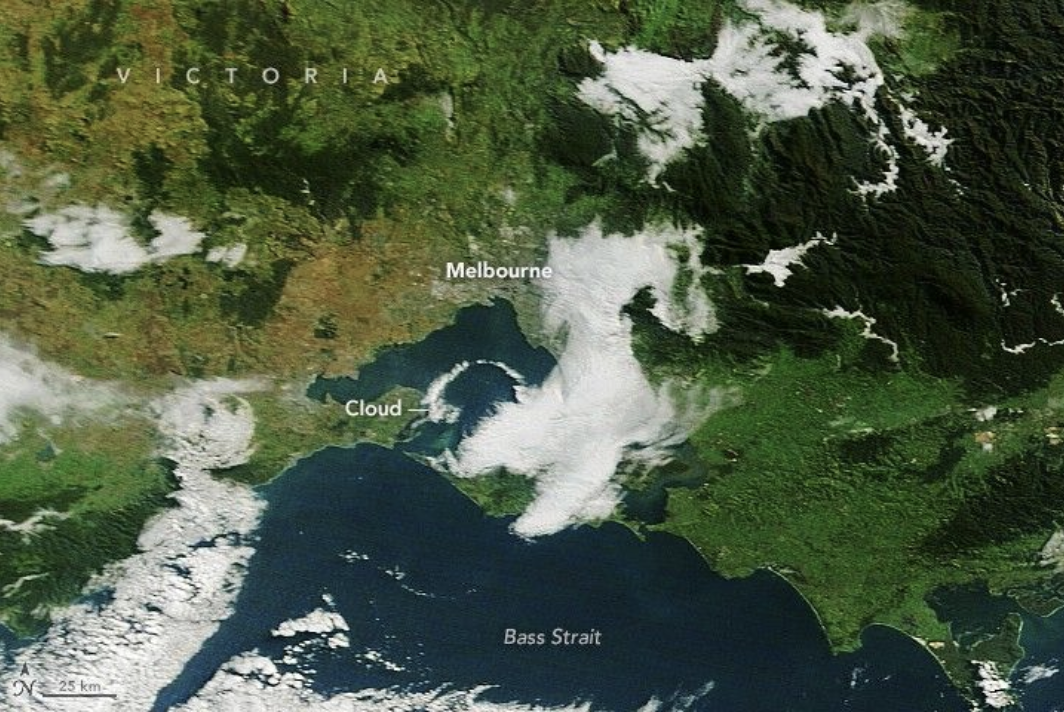
Fog fills networks of river valleys in eastern Victoria, May 11, 2026. NASA Earth Observatory. Note the arch-shaped cloud over Port Phillip Bay.

Victoria, commonly abbreviated as VIC, is a state in southeastern Australia. It is the second most populous state with a population of over 7 million, and the second-smallest, with a land area of 227,444 square kilometres (87,817 sq mi), making it the most densely populated state in Australia (31.1 per km^{2}). (Note: The ACT has a higher population density, but it is a territory rather than a state.) Named in honour of Queen Victoria, Victoria was separated from New South Wales and established as a separate Crown colony in 1851, achieving responsible government in 1855.

Victoria is bordered by New South Wales to the north and South Australia to the west and is bounded by the Bass Strait to the south (with the exception of a small land border with Tasmania located along Boundary Islet), the Southern Ocean to the southwest, and the Tasman Sea (a marginal sea of the South Pacific Ocean) to the southeast. The state encompasses a range of climates and geographical features from its temperate coastal and central regions to the Victorian Alps in the northeast and the semi-arid northwest.

The majority of the Victorian population is concentrated in the central-south area surrounding Port Phillip, and in particular within the metropolitan area of Greater Melbourne, Victoria's state capital and largest city and also Australia's second-largest city, where over three-quarters of the culturally diverse population live (35.1% of inhabitants being immigrants). The state is also home to four of Australia's 20 largest cities: Melbourne, Geelong, Ballarat and Bendigo.

Victoria is home to numerous Aboriginal groups, including the Boonwurrung, the Brataualung, the Djadjawurrung, the Gunai, the Gunditjmara, the Taungurung, the Wathaurong, the Wurundjeri, and the Yorta Yorta. There were more than 30 Aboriginal languages spoken in the area prior to European colonisation. In 1770 James Cook claimed the east coast of the Australian continent for the Kingdom of Great Britain. The first European settlement in the area occurred in 1803 at Sullivan Bay. Much of Victoria was included in 1836 in the Port Phillip District of New South Wales.

The Victorian gold rush in the 1850s and 1860s significantly increased Victoria's population and wealth. By the time of Australian Federation in 1901, Melbourne had become the largest city in Australasia, and was the seat of Federal government until Canberra became the national capital in 1927. The state continued to grow strongly through various periods of the 20th and 21st centuries due to high levels of international and interstate migration. Melbourne hosts a number of museums, art galleries, and theatres; in 2016 a sports marketing company named it the world's sporting capital. Nowadays, Victoria's economy is the second-largest among Australian states and is highly diversified, with service sectors predominating.

Victoria has 38 seats in the Australian House of Representatives and 12 seats in the Australian Senate. At state level, the Parliament of Victoria consists of the Legislative Assembly and the Legislative Council. The Labor Party, led by Ben Carroll as premier, has governed Victoria since 2014. The governor of Victoria, the representative of the monarch in the state, is currently Margaret Gardner. Victoria is divided into 79 local government areas, as well as several unincorporated areas which the state administers directly.

== History ==
=== Indigenous Victorians ===
The state of Victoria was home to many Aboriginal Australian nations that had occupied the land for tens of thousands of years before European settlement. According to Gary Presland, Aboriginal people have lived in Victoria for about 40,000 years, living a semi-nomadic existence of fishing, hunting and gathering, and farming eels.

At the Keilor Archaeological Site, a human hearth excavated in 1971 was radiocarbon-dated to about 31,000 years BP, making Keilor one of the earliest sites of human habitation in Australia. A cranium found at the site has been dated at between 12,000 and 14,700 years BP.

Archaeological sites in Tasmania and on the Bass Strait Islands have been dated to between 20,000 and 35,000 years ago when sea levels were 130 metres below present level allowing First Nations Peoples to move across the region of southern Victoria and onto the land bridge of the Bassian plain to Tasmania by at least 35,000 years ago.

During the Ice Age about 20,000 years BP, the area that is now Port Phillip bay was dry land, and the Yarra and Werribee rivers met, flowed through the heads, then across the plain that is now Bass Strait to the ocean near Tasmania. Tasmania and the Bass Strait islands separated from mainland Australia around 12,000 BP, when the sea level was approximately 50m below present levels. Port Phillip was flooded by post-glacial sea level rise between 8,000 and 6,000 years ago.

Oral history and creation stories from the Wada wurrung, Woiwurrung and Bun wurrung languages describe the flooding of the bay. Hobsons Bay was once a kangaroo hunting ground. Creation stories describe how Bunjil was responsible for the formation of the bay, or the bay was flooded when the Yarra River was created.

=== British colonisation ===
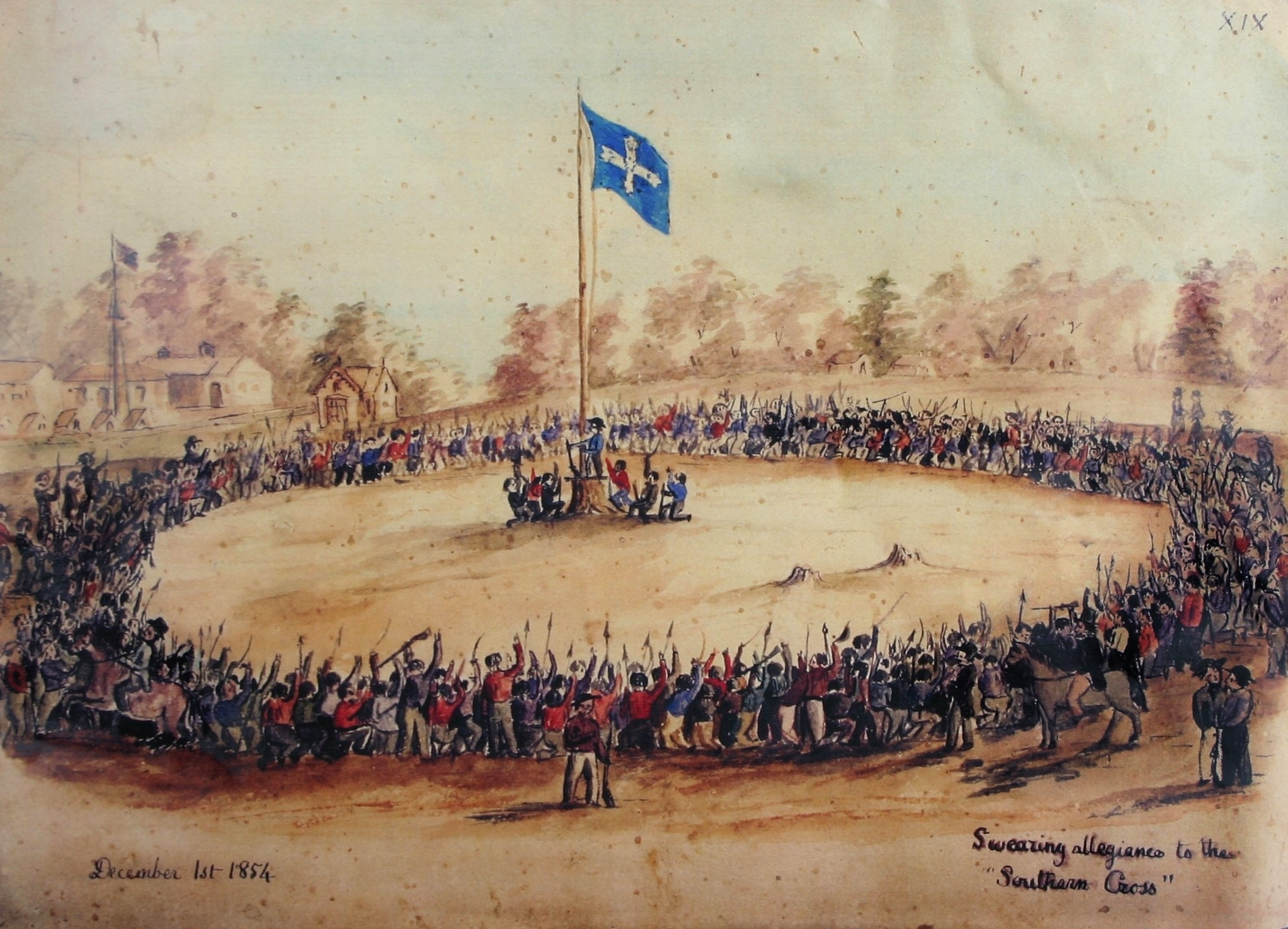
Swearing Allegiance to the Southern Cross at the Eureka Stockade on 1 December 1854 – watercolour by Charles Doudiet

Victoria, like Queensland, was named after Queen Victoria, who had been on the British throne for 14 years when the colony was established in 1851. After the founding of the colony of New South Wales in 1788, Australia was divided into an eastern half named New South Wales and a western half named New Holland, under the administration of the colonial government in Sydney.

The first British settlement in the area later known as Victoria was established in October 1803 under Lieutenant-Governor David Collins at Sullivan Bay on Port Phillip. It consisted of 402 people (five government officials, nine officers of marines, two drummers, and 39 privates, five soldiers' wives and a child, 307 convicts, 17 convicts' wives, and seven children). They had been sent from England in HMS Calcutta under the command of Captain Daniel Woodriff, principally out of fear that the French, who had been exploring the area, might establish their own settlement and thereby challenge British rights to the continent.

In 1826, Colonel Stewart, Captain Samuel Wright, and Lieutenant Burchell were sent in HMS Fly (Captain Wetherall) and the brigs Dragon and Amity, took a number of convicts and a small force composed of detachments of the 3rd and 93rd regiments. The expedition established its headquarters at Settlement Point, on the eastern side of the bay near present-day Corinella). This site served as the base of the outpost until Western Port was abandoned approximately 12 months later, as ordered by Governor Ralph Darling. Victoria's next settlement was at Portland, on the south west coast of what is now Victoria. Edward Henty settled Portland Bay in 1834.

==== Batman's treaty ====
Melbourne was founded in 1835 by John Batman, who set up a base in Indented Head, and John Pascoe Fawkner. From settlement, the region around Melbourne was known as the Port Phillip District, a separately administered part of New South Wales. Shortly after, the site now known as Geelong was surveyed by Assistant Surveyor W. H. Smythe, three weeks after Melbourne. And in 1838, Geelong was officially declared a town, despite earlier European settlements dating back to 1826. On 6 June 1835, just under two years before Melbourne was officially recognised as a settlement, John Batman, the leader of the Port Phillip Association presented Wurundjeri Elders with a land use agreement.

This document, now referred to as the Batman treaty, was later given to the British government to claim that local Aboriginal people had given Batman access to their land in exchange for goods and rations. The treaty itself was declared void as Batman did not have permission from the Crown to establish Melbourne. Today, the meaning and interpretation of this treaty is contested. Some argue it was a pretence for taking Aboriginal land in exchange for trinkets, while others argue it was significant in that it sought to recognise Aboriginal land rights. The exact location of the meeting between Batman and the Kulin men with whom he made the treaty is unknown, although it is believed to have been by the Merri Creek. According to historian Meyer Eidelson, it is generally believed to have occurred on the Merri near modern-day Rushall Station.

=== Colonial Victoria ===
Victoria Colony
- British Crown Colony
- 1851–1901
- Flag (1870–1901) Coat of arms
- Capital: Melbourne
- Government
  - Type: Self-governing colony
- Monarch
  - 1851–1901: Victoria
- Governor
  - 1851–1854: Charles La Trobe (first)
  - 1895–1900: Thomas Brassey (last)
- History
  - Independence from the New South Wales colony: 1851
  - Federation of Australia: 1901
Preceded by	Succeeded by
Colony of New South Wales	Australia; Victoria (Australia)

On 1 July 1851, writs were issued for the election of the first Victorian Legislative Council, and the absolute independence of Victoria from New South Wales was established proclaiming a new Colony of Victoria. Days later, still in 1851 gold was discovered near Ballarat, and subsequently at Bendigo. Later discoveries occurred at many sites across Victoria. This triggered one of the largest gold rushes the world has ever seen. The colony grew rapidly in both population and economic power. In 10 years, the population of Victoria increased sevenfold from 76,000 to 540,000. All sorts of gold records were produced, including the "richest shallow alluvial goldfield in the world" and the largest gold nugget. In the decade 1851–1860 Victoria produced 20 million ounces of gold, one-third of the world's output.

In 1855 the Geological Survey collected and determined the major ion chemistry for groundwater in Victoria. Immigrants arrived from all over the world to search for gold, especially from Ireland and China. By 1857, 26,000 Chinese miners worked in Victoria, and their legacy is particularly strong in Bendigo and its environs.

In 1854 at Ballarat, an armed rebellion against the government of Victoria was made by miners protesting against mining taxes (the "Eureka Stockade"). Although British military forces suppressed the uprising, the armed confrontation compelled colonial authorities to reform the administration of mining concessions—significantly reducing burdensome licence fees—and expand the electoral franchise. The following year, the Imperial Parliament granted Victoria responsible government with the passage of the Colony of Victoria Act 1855. Some of the leaders of the Eureka rebellion went on to become members of the Victorian Parliament.

In 1857, reflecting the growing presence of Irish Catholic immigrants, John O'Shanassy became the colony's second Premier with the former Young Irelander, Charles Gavan Duffy as his deputy. Melbourne's Protestant establishment was ill-prepared "to countenance so startling a novelty". In 1858–59, Melbourne Punch cartoons linked Duffy and O'Shanassy to the terrors of the French Revolution.

In 1862 Duffy's Land Act attempted, but failed, through a system of extended pastoral licences, to break the land-holding monopoly of the so-called "squatter" class. In 1871, having led, on behalf of small farmers, opposition to Premier Sir James McCulloch's land tax, Duffy, himself, was briefly Premier.

In 1893 widespread bank failures brought to an end a sustained period of prosperity and of increasingly wild speculation in land and construction. Melbourne nonetheless retained, as the legacy of the gold rush, its status as Australia's primary financial centre and largest city. In 1901, Victoria became a state in the Commonwealth of Australia. While Canberra was being built, Melbourne served until 1927 as the country's first federal capital.

== Geography ==
Victoria's northern border follows a straight line (the Black–Allan Line) from Cape Howe to the start of the Murray River and then follows the Murray River as the remainder of the northern border. On the Murray River, the border is the southern bank of the river. This precise definition was not established until 1980, when a ruling by Justice Ninian Stephen of the High Court of Australia settled the question as to which state had jurisdiction in the unlawful death of a man on an island in the middle of the river. The ruling clarified that no part of the watercourse is in Victoria. The border also rests at the southern end of the Great Dividing Range, which stretches along the east coast and terminates west of Ballarat. It is bordered by South Australia to the west and shares Australia's shortest land border with Tasmania. The official border between Victoria and Tasmania is at 39°12' S, which passes through Boundary Islet in the Bass Strait for 85 metres.

Victoria contains many topographically, geologically and climatically diverse areas, ranging from the wet, temperate climate of Gippsland in the southeast to the snow-covered Victorian alpine areas which rise to almost 2,000 metres (6,600 ft), with Mount Bogong the highest peak at 1,986 metres (6,516 ft). There are extensive semi-arid plains to the west and northwest. There is an extensive series of river systems in Victoria. Most notable is the Murray River system.

Other rivers include: Ovens River

- Goulburn River
- Patterson River
- King River
- Campaspe River
- Loddon River
- Wimmera River
- Elgin River, Barwon River
- Thomson River
- Snowy River
- Latrobe River
- Yarra River
- Maribyrnong River
- Mitta Mitta River
- Hopkins River
- Merri River
- Kiewa River

The state symbols include the pink heath (state flower), Leadbeater's possum (state animal) and the helmeted honeyeater (state bird). Ecological communities include Victorian Volcanic Plain grasslands, Northern Plains Grassland and Gippsland Plains Grassy Woodland, all of which are critically endangered.

According to Geoscience Australia, the geographic centre of Victoria is located in Mandurang at 36° 51' 15"S, 144° 16' 52" E. The small rural locality is located 10 km (6 mi) south of Bendigo. Due to its central location and the region's historical ties to the gold rush, the town is widely regarded as the "Heart of Gold". The state's capital, Melbourne, contains about 70% of the state's population and dominates its economy, media, and culture. For other cities and towns, see list of localities (Victoria) and local government areas of Victoria.

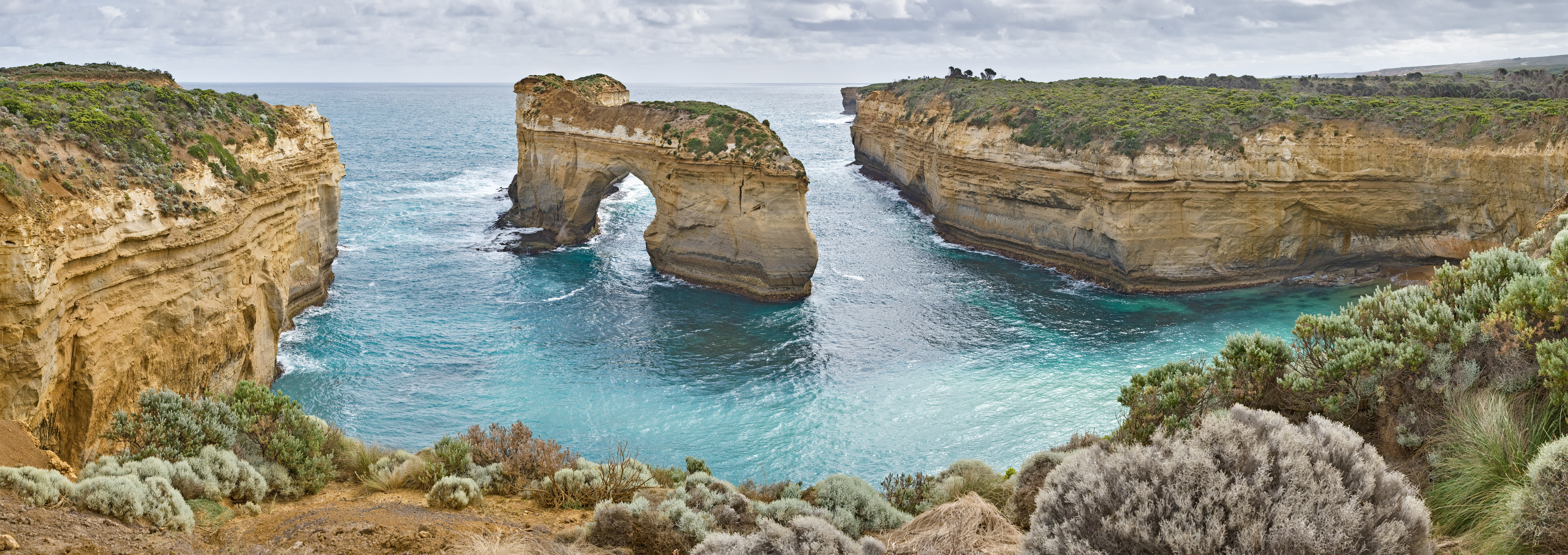
Island Archway on the Great Ocean Road in Victoria, Australia

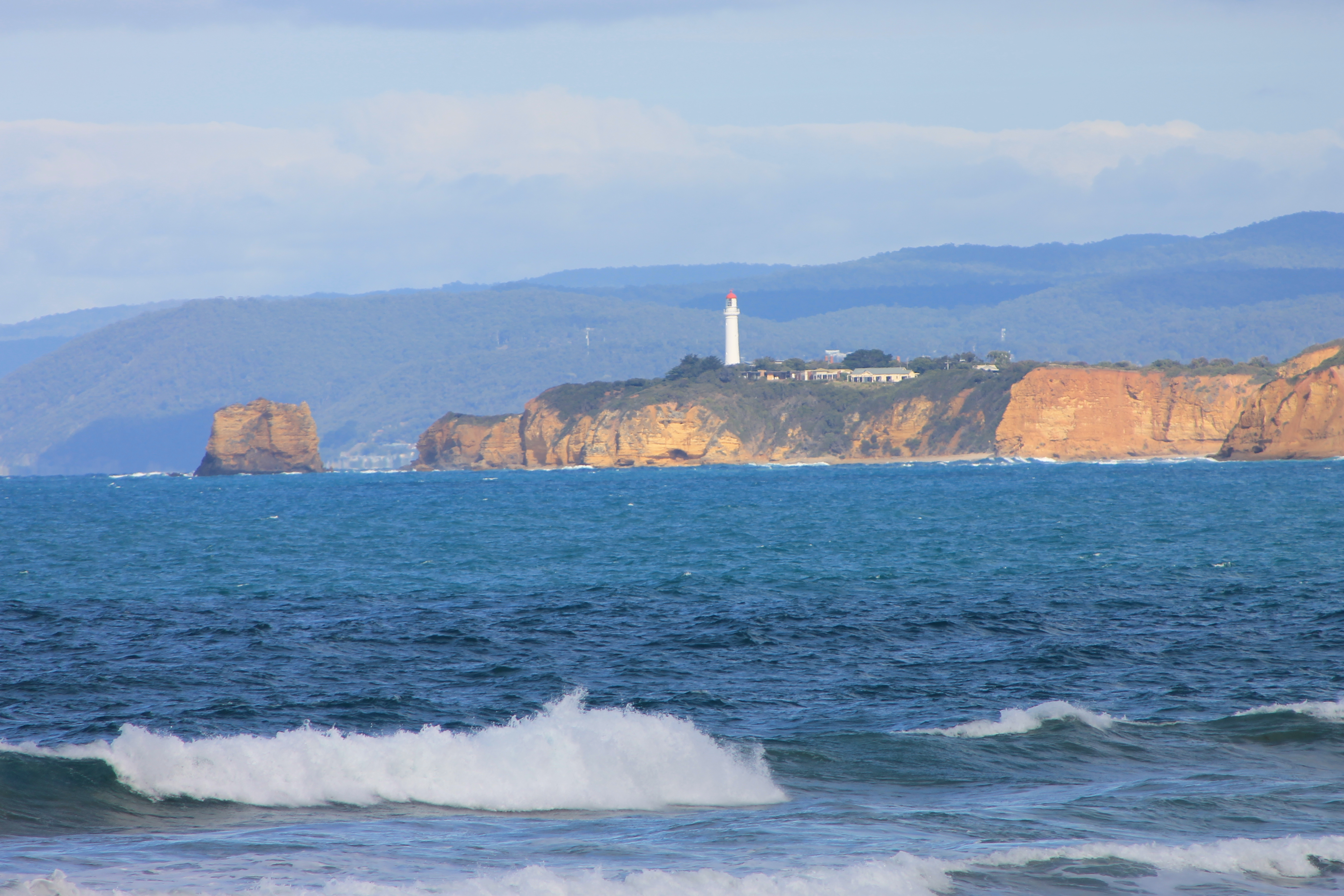
Aireys Inlet

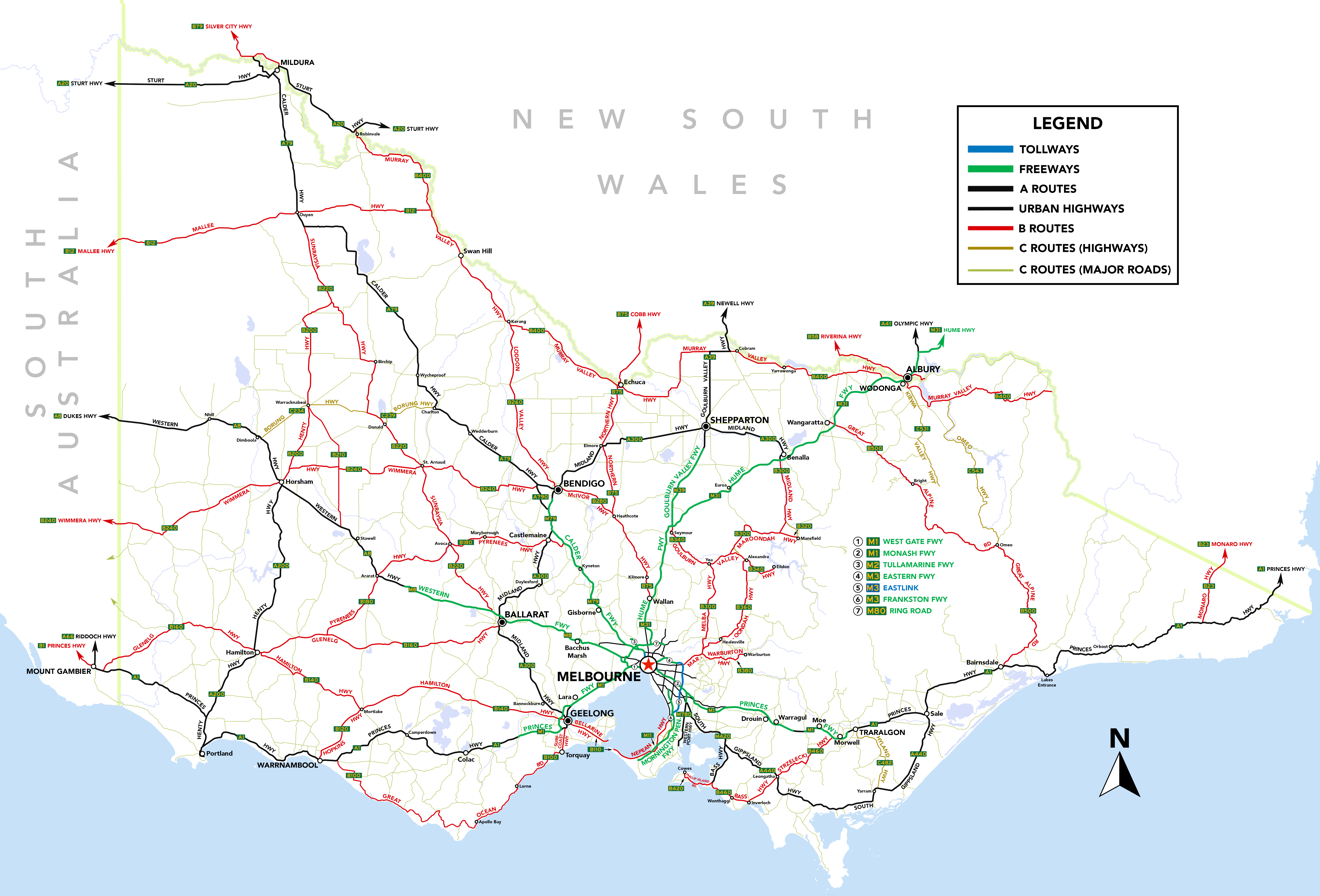
Victorian highway and road network, with significant cities and towns.

=== Regions ===
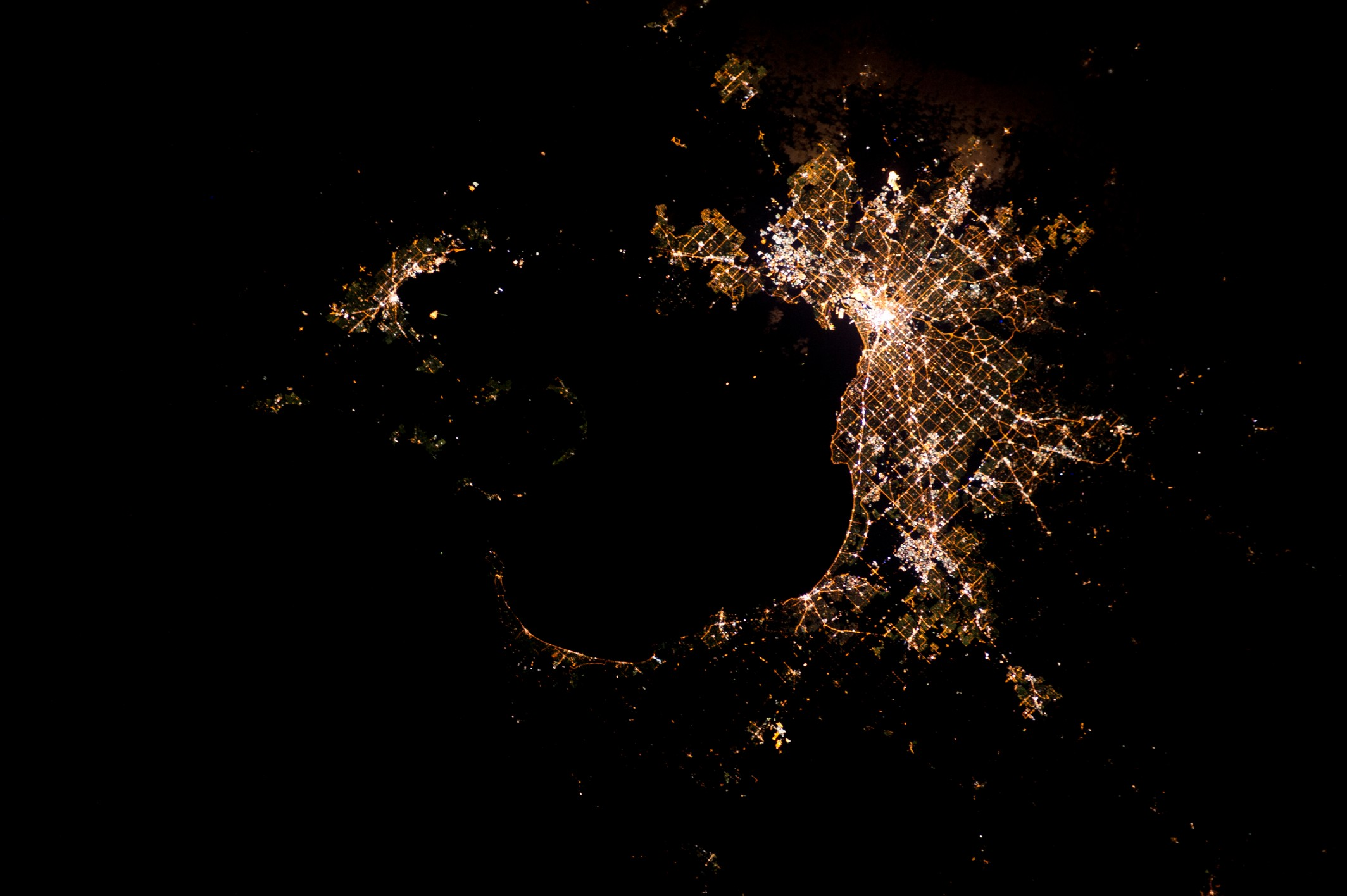
Greater Melbourne at night from the International Space Station

Victoria is divided into distinct geographic regions, most commonly for the purposes of economic development, while others for land management (agriculture or conservation) and for censusing (statistical or meteorological) or electoral purposes. The most commonly used regions are those created by the state government for the purposes of economic development.

In addition to Greater Melbourne, the Victoria State Government has divided Victoria into five regions covering all parts of the state. The five regional Victoria divisions are:

- Barwon South West
- Gippsland
- Grampians
- Hume
- Loddon Mallee

The Australian Bureau of Meteorology defines regions for its own purposes, some of which share names with the economic regions, even though the exact boundaries may not correlate. As of November 2014, they are:

- Mallee
- Wimmera
- Northern Country
- North East Victoria
- East Gippsland
- West & South Gippsland
- Central Victoria
- North Central Victoria
- South West Victoria
- Alpine Victoria
- Central ( Melbourne )

=== Cities and towns ===
This is a list of places in the Australian state of Victoria by population. Urban centres are defined by the Australian Bureau of Statistics as being a population cluster of 1,000 or more people. The below figures broadly represent the populations of the contiguous built-up areas of each city:

Population by Statistical Urban Centre
Rank	Urban centre	Population			
Rank	Urban centre	2021 census	2016 census	2011 census	2006 census
1	Melbourne	4,917,750	4,196,201	3,707,530	3,375,341
2	Geelong	180,239	157,103	143,921	135,965
3	Ballarat	116,201	93,761	85,936	77,766
4	Bendigo	103,034	92,384	82,795	75,420
–	Melton	N/A	54,455	45,625	35,194
5	Shepparton – Mooroopna	68,409	46,194	42,742	38,247
6	Mildura	56,972	33,445	31,363	30,761
–	Pakenham	54,118	46,421	32,913	18,621
7	Wodonga	43,253	35,131	31,605	29,538
8	Sunbury	38,851	34,425	33,062	29,071
9	Warrnambool	35,406	30,707	29,286	28,015
10	Wangaratta	29,808	18,567	17,376	16,732
11	Traralgon	26,907	25,482	24,590	21,474
12	Bacchus Marsh	24,717	17,303	14,914	13,046
13	Warragul	23,051	14,274	13,081	11,333
14	Horsham	20,429	15,630	15,261	13,945
15	Ocean Grove – Barwon Heads	19,394	18,208	16,091	13,701
16	Torquay – Jan Juc	18,534	16,942	13,336	9,463 (Note: This figure is for Torquay only.)
17	Moe – Newborough	16,844	15,062	15,293	15,159
18	Sale	15,472	13,507	12,764	13,090
19	Morwell	14,432	13,540	13,689	13,399

=== Climate ===
Köppen climate types in Victoria

Average monthly maximum temperatures in Victoria
Month	Melbourne °C (°F)	Mildura °C (°F)
January	25.8 (78)	32.8 (91)
February	25.8 (78)	32.7 (91)
March	23.8 (75)	29.3 (85)
April	20.2 (68)	24.1 (75)
May	16.6 (62)	19.6 (67)
June	14.0 (57)	16.0 (61)
July	13.4 (56)	15.4 (60)
August	14.9 (59)	17.7 (64)
September	17.2 (63)	21.1 (70)
October	19.6 (67)	25.0 (77)
November	21.8 (71)	29.0 (84)
December	24.1 (75)	31.7 (89)
Source: Bureau of Meteorology

Victoria has a varied climate that ranges from semi-arid temperate with hot summers in the north-west, to temperate and cool along the coast. Victoria's main land feature, the Great Dividing Range, produces a cooler, mountain climate in the centre of the state. Winters along the coast of the state, particularly around Melbourne, are relatively mild (see chart).

The coastal plain south of the Great Dividing Range has Victoria's mildest climate. Air from the Southern Ocean helps reduce the heat of summer and the cold of winter. Melbourne and other large cities are located in this temperate region.

The Mallee and upper Wimmera are Victoria's warmest regions with hot winds blowing from nearby semi-deserts. Average temperatures exceed 32 °C (90 °F) during summer and 15 °C (59 °F) in winter. Except at cool mountain elevations, the inland monthly temperatures are 2–7 °C (4–13 °F) warmer than around Melbourne (see chart). Victoria's highest maximum temperature of 48.9 °C (120.0 °F) was recorded in Walepup/ Hopetoun on 27 January 2026, during the January 2026 heatwave affecting the State.

The Victorian Alps in the northeast are the coldest part of Victoria. The Alps are part of the Great Dividing Range mountain system extending east–west through the centre of Victoria. Mean maximum temperatures are less than 9 °C (48 °F) in winter and below 0 °C (32 °F) in the highest parts of the ranges. The state's lowest minimum temperature of −11.7 °C (10.9 °F) was recorded at Omeo on 15 June 1965, and again at Falls Creek on 3 July 1970. Temperature extremes for the state are listed in the table below:

Climate data for Victoria
Month	Jan	Feb	Mar	Apr	May	Jun	Jul	Aug	Sep	Oct	Nov	Dec	Year
Record high °C (°F)	48.9 (120.0)	48.8 (119.8)	44.4 (111.9)	39.3 (102.7)	32.2 (90.0)	25.7 (78.3)	27.1 (80.8)	29.9 (85.8)	37.7 (99.9)	40.2 (104.4)	45.8 (114.4)	46.6 (115.9)	48.9 (120.0)
Record low °C (°F)	−3.9 (25.0)	−3.9 (25.0)	−4.3 (24.3)	−8.2 (17.2)	−8.3 (17.1)	−11.7 (10.9)	−11.7 (10.9)	−10.5 (13.1)	−9.4 (15.1)	−8.4 (16.9)	−7.0 (19.4)	−5.2 (22.6)	−11.7 (10.9)
Source: Bureau of Meteorology

==== Rainfall ====
Rainfall in Victoria increases from south to the northeast, with higher averages in areas of high altitude. Mean annual rainfall exceeds 1,800 millimetres (71 inches) in some parts of the northeast but is less than 280 mm (11 in) in the Mallee. Rain is heaviest in the Otway Ranges and Gippsland in southern Victoria and in the mountainous northeast. Snow generally falls only in the mountains and hills in the centre of the state. Rain falls most frequently in winter, but summer precipitation is heavier. Rainfall is most reliable in Gippsland and the Western District, making them both leading farming areas. Victoria's highest recorded daily rainfall was 377.8 mm (14.87 in) at Tidal River in Wilsons Promontory National Park on 23 March 2011.

Average temperatures and precipitation for Victoria

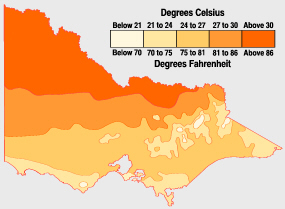
Average January maximum temperatures:
Victoria's north is almost always hotter than coastal and mountainous areas.

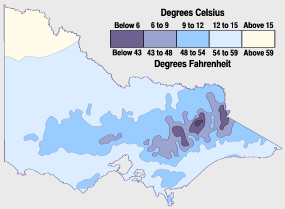
Average July maximum temperatures:
Victoria's hills and ranges are coolest during winter. Snow also falls there.

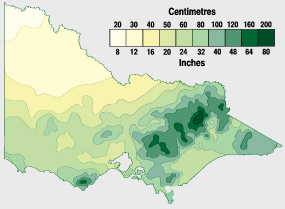
Average yearly precipitation:
Victoria's rainfall is concentrated in the mountainous north-east and coast.
Source: Bureau of Meteorology, Department of Primary Industries, Australian Natural Resources Atlas

== Demographics ==
The estimated resident population since 1981

Population growth estimates for Victoria
Year	Population estimate
2001	4,763,615
2011	5,537,817
2021	6,547,822
2031	7,802,503
2041	9,057,948
2051	10,328,326
Source: Dept of Transport and Planning

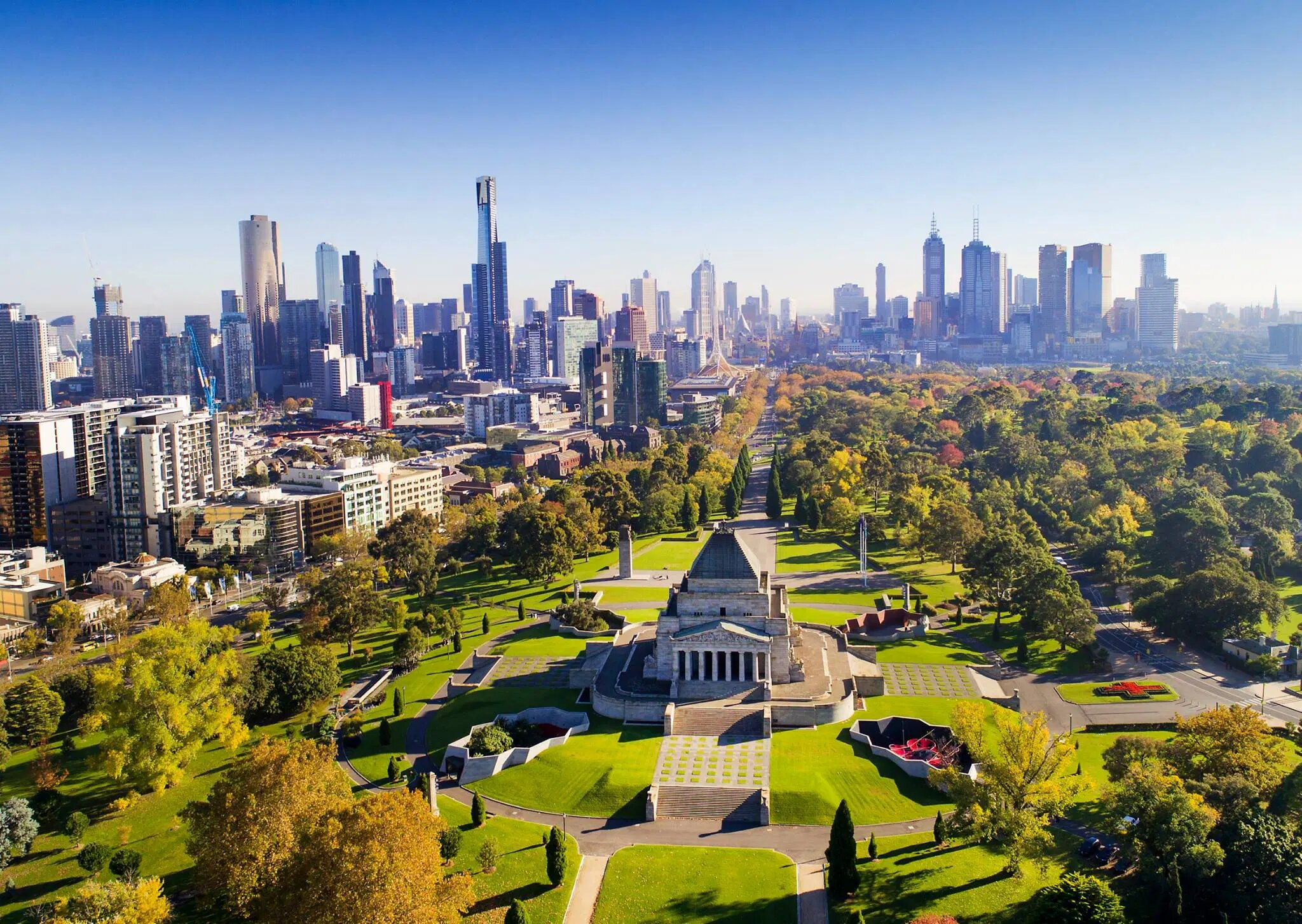
Melbourne, the state capital, is home to more than three in four Victorians.

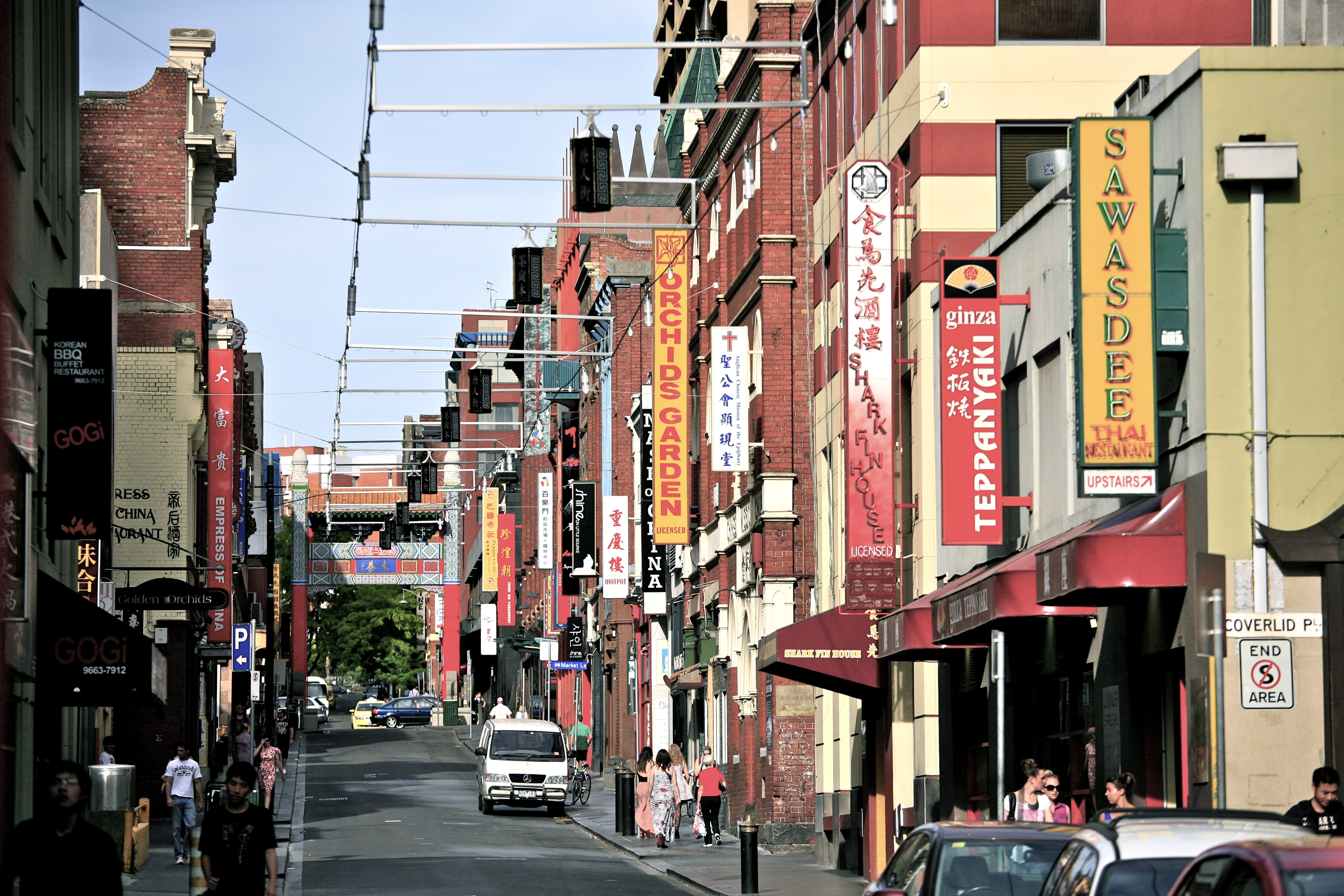
Chinatown, Melbourne. 2.7% of the Victorian population was born in China, 6.7% of the Victorian population is of Chinese ancestry, and 3.2% of the Victorian population speaks Mandarin at home.

It is estimated that on 30 June 2025, Victoria had a population of 7,074,468. The Australian Bureau of Statistics estimates that the population may well reach 10.3 million by 2051.

Victoria's founding Anglo-Celtic population has been supplemented by successive waves of migrants from Southern and Eastern Europe, Asia and, most recently, Africa and the Middle East. Victoria's population is ageing in proportion with the average of the remainder of the Australian population.

About 72% of Victorians are Australian-born. This figure falls to around 66% in Melbourne but rises to higher than 95% in some rural areas in the north west of the state. Less than 1% of Victorians identify themselves as Aboriginal.

More than 75% of Victorians live in Melbourne, located in the state's south. The greater Melbourne metropolitan area is home to an estimated 5,207,145 people. Urban centres outside Melbourne include Geelong, Ballarat, Bendigo, Shepparton, Mildura, Warrnambool, Wodonga and the Latrobe Valley.

Victoria is Australia's most urbanised state: nearly 90% of residents living in cities and towns. State Government efforts to decentralise population have included an official campaign run since 2003 to encourage Victorians to settle in regional areas, however Melbourne continues to rapidly outpace these areas in terms of population growth.

=== Ancestry and immigration ===
Country of birth (2016)
Birthplace (Note: In accordance with the Australian Bureau of Statistics source, England, Scotland, mainland China and the special administrative regions of Hong Kong and Macau are listed separately.)	Population
Australia	3,845,493
England	171,443
India	169,802
Mainland China	160,652
New Zealand	93,253
Vietnam	80,253
Italy	70,527
Sri Lanka	55,830
Philippines	51,290
Malaysia	50,049
Greece	47,240

At the 2016 census, the most commonly nominated ancestries were: (Note: As a percentage of 5,533,099 persons who nominated their ancestry at the 2016 census.)

- English (32%)
- Australian (29.9%) (Note: The Australian Bureau of Statistics has stated that most who nominate "Australian" as their ancestry are part of the Anglo-Celtic group.)
- Irish (10.8%)
- Scottish (8.9%)
- Chinese (6.7%)
- Italian (6.4%)
- Indian (3.8%)
- German (3.6%)
- Greek (3.1%)
- Vietnamese (2%)
- Dutch (1.8%)
- Maltese (1.3%)
- Filipino (1.2%)
- Polish (1%)

0.8% of the population, or 47,788 people, identified as Indigenous Australians (Aboriginal Australians and Torres Strait Islanders) in 2016. (Note: Of any ancestry. Includes those identifying as Aboriginal Australians or Torres Strait Islanders. Indigenous identification is separate to the ancestry question on the Australian census and persons identifying as Aboriginal or Torres Strait Islander may identify any ancestry.)

At the 2016 census, 64.9% of residents were born in Australia. The other most common countries of birth were England (2.9%), India (2.9%), mainland China (2.7%), New Zealand (1.6%) and Vietnam (1.4%).

=== Language ===
As of the 2016 census, 72.2% of Victorians speak English at home. Speakers of other languages include Mandarin (3.2%), Italian (1.9%), Greek (1.9%), Vietnamese (1.7%), and Arabic (1.3%).

=== Religion ===
In the 2016 Census, 47.9% of Victorians described themselves as Christian, 10.6% stated that they followed other religions and 32.1% stated that they had no religion or held secular or other spiritual beliefs. In the survey, 31.7% of Victorians stated they had no religion, Roman Catholics were 23.2%, 9.4% did not answer the question, 9% were Anglican and 3.5% were Eastern Orthodox. In 2017 the proportion of couples marrying in a civil ceremony in Victoria was 77.3%; the other 22.7% were married in a religious ceremony.

=== Age structure and fertility ===
The government predicts that nearly a quarter of Victorians will be aged over 60 by 2021. The 2016 census revealed that Australian median age has crept upward from 35 to 37 since 2001, which reflects the population growth peak of 1969–72. In 2017, Victoria recorded a TFR of 1.724.

=== Average demographic ===
The "average Victorian" according to the demographic statistics may be described as follows:

2016 Victorian census
Median age	37
Sex (mode)	Female
Country of birth of person (mode)	Australia
Country of birth of parents (mode)	At least one parent born overseas
Language spoken at home (mode)	English
Ancestry 1st response (mode)	English
Social marital status (mode)	Married in a registered marriage
Family composition (mode)	Couple family with children
Count of all children in family (mode)	Two children in family
Highest year of school completed (mode)	Year 12 or equivalent
Unpaid domestic work: number of hours (mode)	5 to 14 hours
Number of motor vehicles (mode)	Two vehicles
Number of bedrooms in private dwelling (mode)	Three bedrooms
Tenure type (dwelling count) (mode)	Owned with a mortgage

== Crime ==
In the year ending September 2020, the statistics were skewed by the introduction of six new public safety offences relating to the COVID-19 pandemic in Australia. Total offences numbered 551,710, with 32,713 of these being breaches of Chief Health Officer Directions. The total offences occurred at a rate of 8,227 per 100,000 people, up 4.4% on the previous year. While there have been some dips along the way, the rate of recorded offences have increased year on year since 2011, when the figure was 6,937.7 offences per 100,000 people.

Criminal offences recorded in Victoria 2010–14
	2010	2011	2012	2013	2014
Number of offences	378,082	386,061	423,555	437,409	456,381

== Government ==
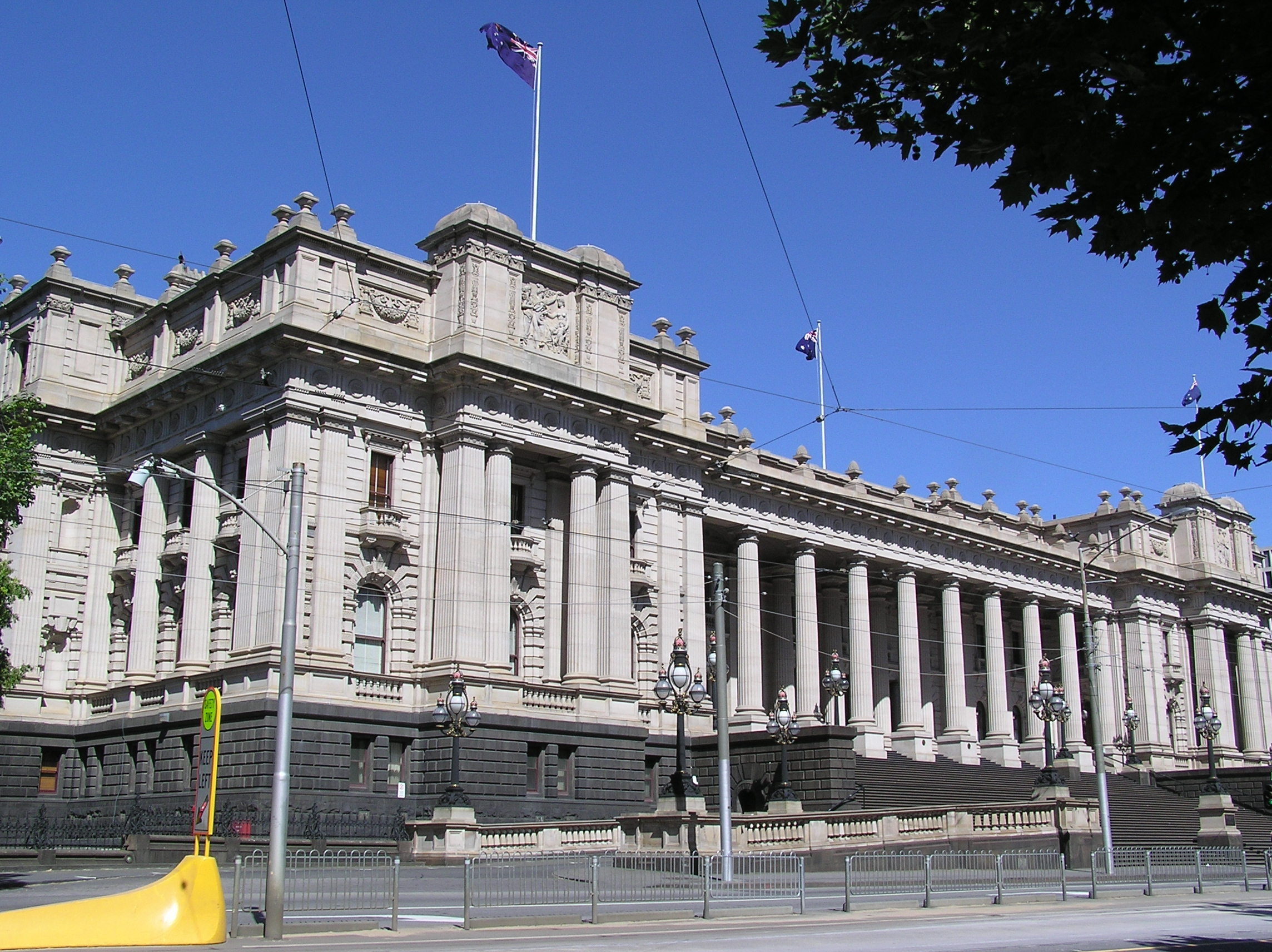
The Victorian Parliament House, built in 1856, stands in Spring Street, Melbourne. The building was intended to be finished with a dome, but was not completed due to budget constraints.

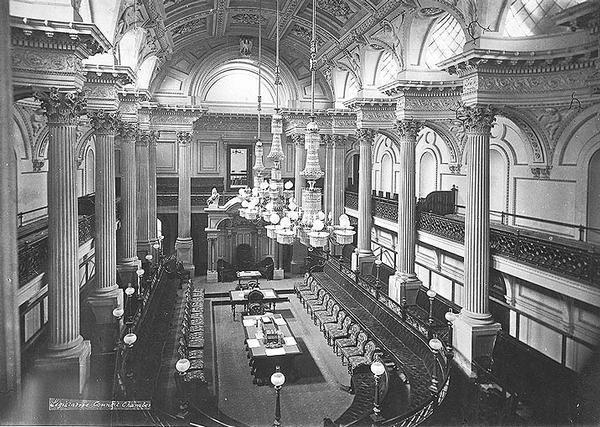
The Legislative Council Chamber, as photographed in 1878

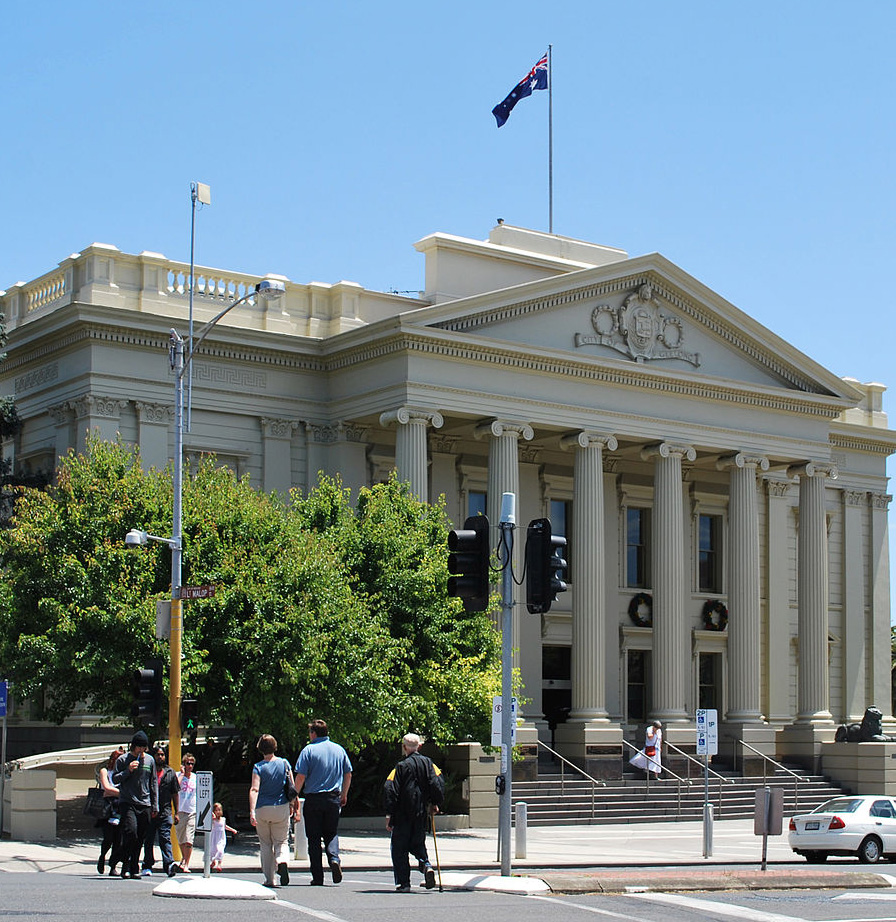
One of many local government seats, Geelong Town Hall

=== Parliament ===
Victoria has a parliamentary form of government based on the Westminster System. Legislative power resides in the Parliament consisting of the Governor (the representative of the King), the executive (the Government), and two legislative chambers. The Parliament of Victoria consists of the lower house Legislative Assembly, the upper house Legislative Council and the monarch. Eighty-eight members of the Legislative Assembly are elected to four-year terms from single-member electorates.

In November 2006, the Victorian Legislative Council elections were held under a new multi-member proportional representation system. The State of Victoria was divided into eight electorates with each electorate represented by five representatives elected by Single Transferable Vote. The total number of upper house members was reduced from 44 to 40 and their term of office is now the same as the lower house members—four years. Elections for the Victorian Parliament are now fixed and occur in November every four years. Prior to the 2006 election, the Legislative Council consisted of 44 members elected to eight-year terms from 22 two-member electorates.

Party	Legislative Assembly	Legislative Council
Labor	56	15
Liberal	19	12
National	9	2
Greens	4	4
Others	0	7

=== Premier and cabinet ===
The Premier of Victoria is the leader of the political party or coalition with the most seats in the Legislative Assembly. The Premier is the public face of government and, with cabinet, sets the legislative and political agenda. Cabinet consists of representatives elected to either house of parliament. It is responsible for managing areas of government that are not exclusively vested in the Commonwealth, by the Australian Constitution, such as education, health and law enforcement. The current Premier of Victoria is Ben Carroll.

=== Governor ===
Executive authority is vested in the Governor of Victoria who represents and is appointed by the monarch. The post is usually filled by a retired prominent Victorian. The governor acts on the advice of the premier and cabinet. The current Governor of Victoria is Margaret Gardner.

=== Constitution ===
Victoria has a written constitution enacted in 1975, but based on the 1855 colonial constitution, passed by the United Kingdom Parliament as the Victoria Constitution Act 1855, which establishes the Parliament as the state's law-making body for matters coming under state responsibility. The Victorian Constitution can be amended by the Parliament of Victoria, except for certain "entrenched" provisions that require either an absolute majority in both houses, a three-fifths majority in both houses, or the approval of the Victorian people in a referendum, depending on the provision. To this day, not a single referendum has been held to change the Victorian Constitution.

=== Politics ===
Victoria is considered by some analysts to be the most progressive state in the nation. The state recorded the highest Yes votes of any state in the republic referendum, same-sex marriage survey and Indigenous Voice referendum. Victorians are said to be "generally socially progressive, supportive of multiculturalism, wary of extremes of any kind". Premier Ben Carroll leads the Victorian Labor Party who replaced Jacinta Allan after her resignation in July 2026. Labor has been in power since the November 2014 Victorian state election, and has been in power in 33 of the 44 years since 1982.

The centre-left Australian Labor Party (ALP), the centre-right Liberal Party of Australia, the rural-based National Party of Australia, and the left-wing environmentalist Australian Greens are Victoria's main political parties. Traditionally, Labor is strongest in Melbourne's working and middle class western, northern and inner-city suburbs, and the regional cities of Ballarat, Bendigo and Geelong. The Liberals' main support lies in Melbourne's more affluent eastern suburbs and outer suburbs, and some rural and regional centres. The Nationals are strongest in Victoria's North Western and Eastern rural regional areas. The Greens, who won their first lower house seats in 2014, are strongest in inner Melbourne.

=== Federal government ===
Victorian voters elect 50 representatives to the Parliament of Australia, including 38 members of the House of Representatives and 12 members of the Senate. Since 1 April 2023, the ALP hold 25 Victorian house seats, the Liberals 10, the Nationals three, the Greens one, and independents the remaining three. The ALP and the Liberals hold four senate seats each, while the Nationals, Greens, UAP and an independent hold one seat each.

=== Local government ===
Victoria is incorporated into 79 municipalities for the purposes of local government, including 39 shires, 32 cities, seven rural cities and one borough. Shire and city councils are responsible for functions delegated by the Victorian parliament, such as city planning, road infrastructure and waste management. Council revenue comes mostly from property taxes and government grants.

== Education ==
=== Primary and secondary ===
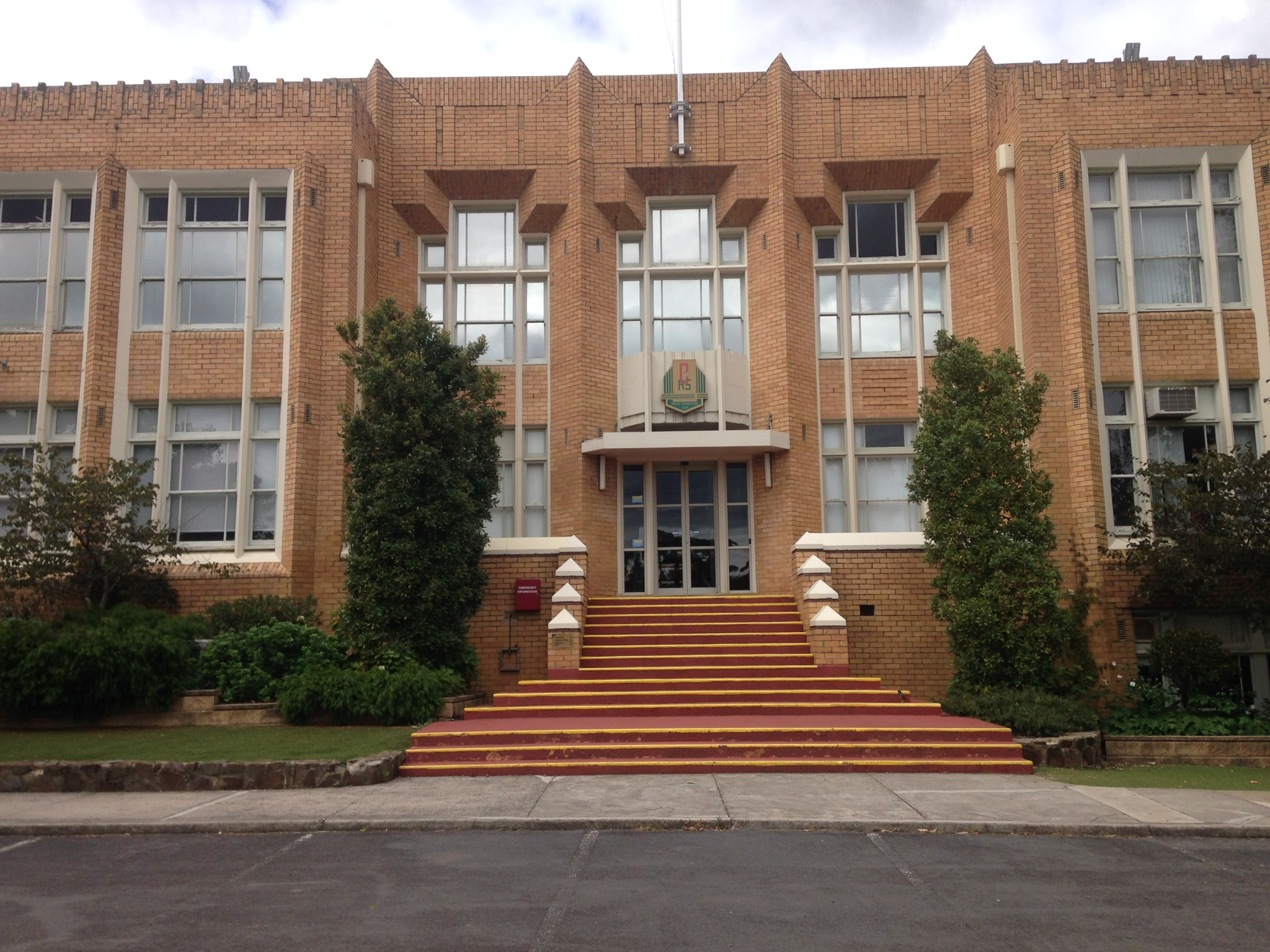
Camberwell High School, a public secondary school in Victoria

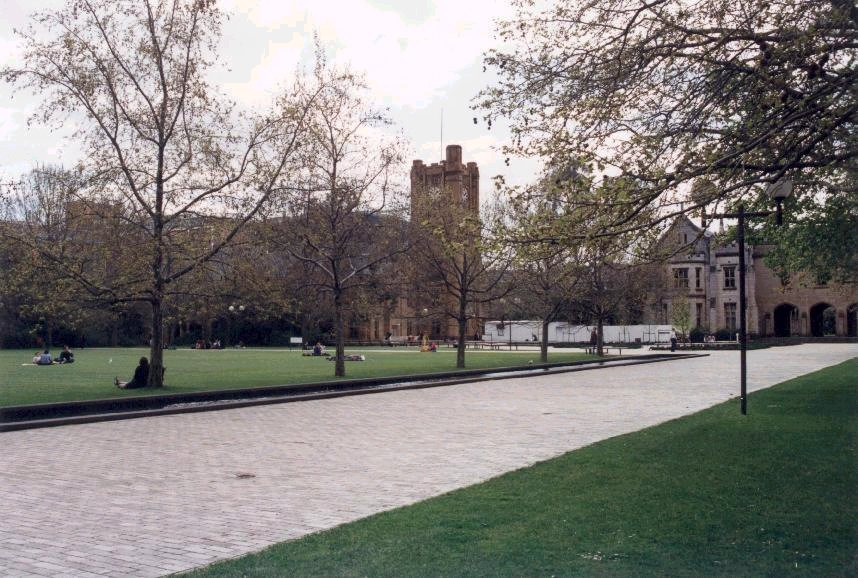
The University of Melbourne, ranked as one of the best universities in Australia and in the Southern Hemisphere, is Victoria's oldest university.

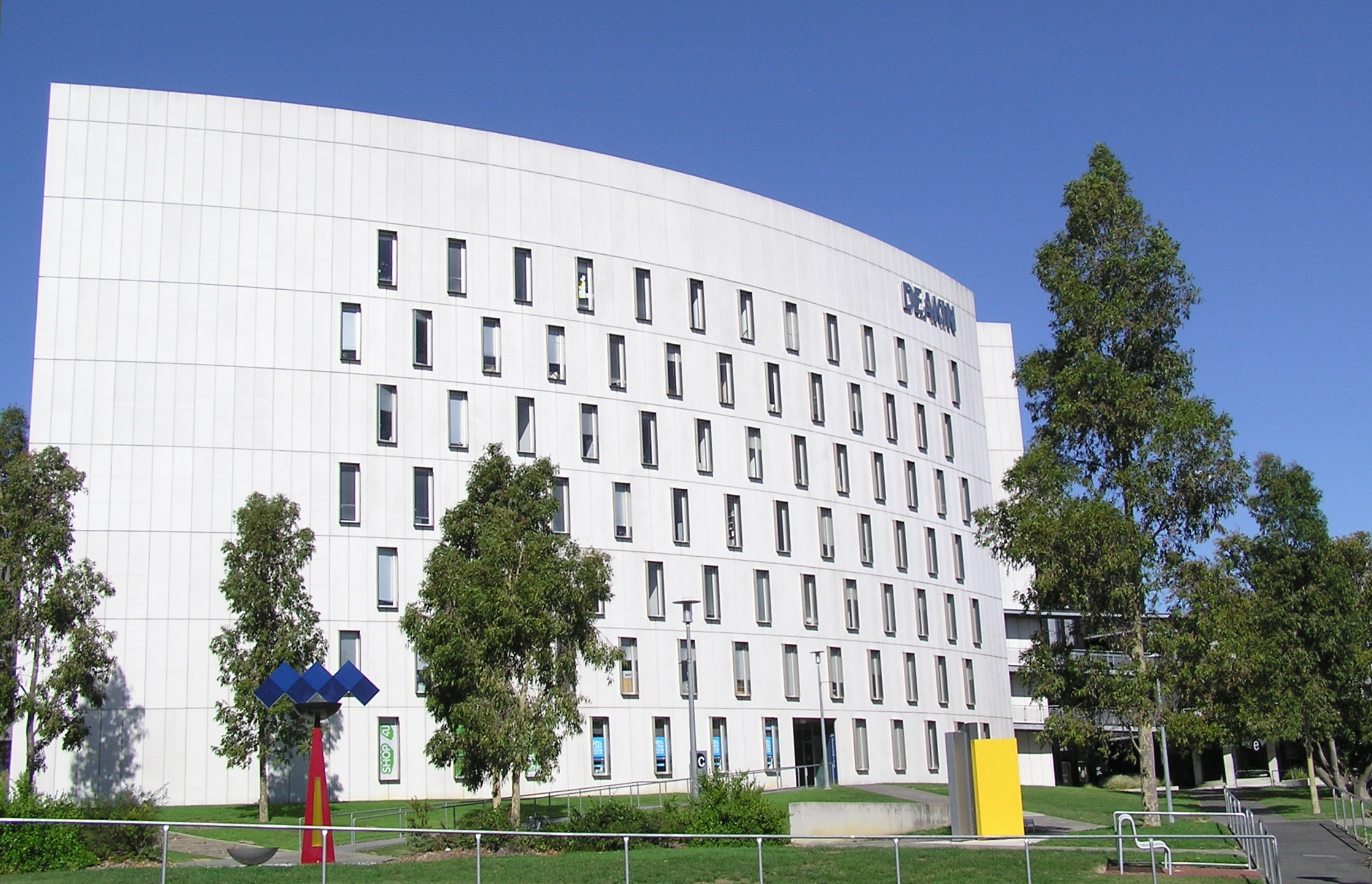
Deakin University consistently leads the state in student satisfaction, and is consistently ranked as one of the world's best young universities.

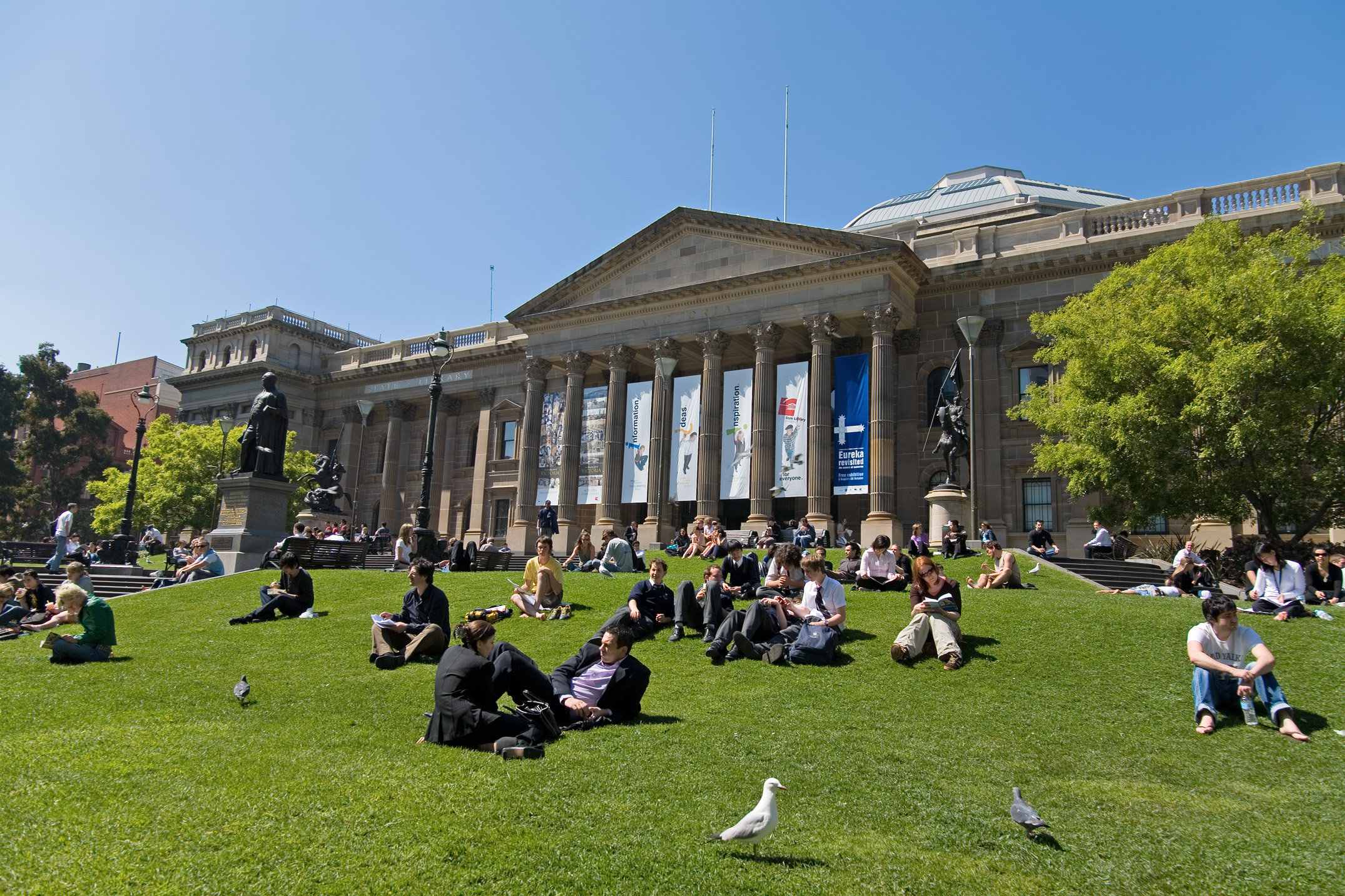
The State Library of Victoria is the fourth most visited public library in the world.

Victoria's state school system dates back to 1872, when the colonial government legislated to make schooling free, secular and compulsory. The state's public secondary school system began in 1905. Before then, only private secondary schooling was available. Today, a Victorian school education consists of seven years of primary schooling (including one preparatory year) and six years of secondary schooling.

The final years of secondary school are optional for children aged over 17. Victorian children generally begin school at age five or six. On completing secondary school, students earn the Victorian Certificate of Education (VCE) or Victorian Certificate of Education - Vocational Major (VCE-VM). Students who successfully complete their VCE (not including VCE-VM students) also receive an ATAR, to determine university admittance (unless the student is 'going unscored'.

Victorian schools are either publicly or privately funded. Public schools, also known as state or government schools, are funded and run directly by the Victorian Department of Education. Students do not pay tuition fees, but some extra costs are levied. Private fee-paying schools include parish schools run by the Roman Catholic Church and independent schools similar to British public schools. Independent schools are usually affiliated with Protestant churches. Victoria also has several private Jewish and Islamic primary and secondary schools. Private schools also receive some public funding. All schools must comply with government-set curriculum standards. In addition, Victoria has six government selective schools, Melbourne High School for boys, MacRobertson Girls' High School for girls, the coeducational schools John Monash Science School, Nossal High School and Suzanne Cory High School, and the Victorian College of the Arts Secondary School. Students at these schools are exclusively admitted on the basis of an academic selective entry test. Victoria also offers an online schooling system, called Virtual School Victoria, or VSV.

As of February 2019, Victoria had 1,529 public schools, 496 Catholic schools and 219 independent schools. Just under 631,500 students were enrolled in public schools, and just over 357,000 in private schools. Over 58 per cent of private students attend Catholic schools. More than 552,300 students were enrolled in primary schools and more than 418,600 in secondary schools. Retention rates for the final two years of secondary school were 84.3 per cent for public school students and 91.5 per cent for private school students. Victoria has about 46,523 full-time teachers.

=== Tertiary education ===
Victoria has nine universities. The first to offer degrees, the University of Melbourne, enrolled its first student in 1855. The largest, Monash University, has an enrolment of over 83,000 students—more than any other Australian university.

The number of students enrolled in Victorian universities was 418,447 in 2018, an increase of 5.3% on the previous year. International students made up 40% of enrolments and account for the highest percentage of pre-paid university tuition fees. The largest number of enrolments were recorded in the fields of business, administration and economics, with nearly 30% of all students, followed by arts, humanities, and social science, with 18% of enrolments.

Victoria has 12 government-run institutions of technical and further education (TAFE). The first vocational institution in the state was the Melbourne Mechanics' Institute (established in 1839), which is now the Melbourne Athenaeum. More than 1,000 adult education organisations are registered to provide recognised TAFE programs. In 2014, there were 443,000 students enrolled in vocational education in the state. By 2018, the number of students in the sector had dropped by 40 per cent to 265,000—a five-year low which the education department attributed to withdrawal of funding to low-quality providers and a societal shift to university education.

=== Libraries ===
The State Library Victoria is the State's research and reference library. It is responsible for collecting and preserving Victoria's documentary heritage and making it available through a range of services and programs. Material in the collection includes books, newspapers, magazines, journals, manuscripts, maps, pictures, objects, sound and video recordings and databases. The state has public libraries in most LGAs (typically with multiple branches in their respective municipal areas) and academic libraries in universities, and some special libraries.

== Economy ==
Victorian production and workers by economic activities
Economic sector	GSP produced (Note: The figures are taken as a proportion of total Victoria Gross State Product, Industry Value Added with the exclusion of Ownership of dwellings, Taxes Less Subsidiaries and the Statistical Discrepancy adjustment.)	Number of workers ('000s)	Percentage of workers
Finance, insurance services	12.8%	115.5	3.8%
Professional, technical services	9.1%	274.3	9.0%
Manufacturing	8.6%	274.4	9.0%
Health Care, social services	8.5%	390.6	12.8%
Construction	7.7%	255.7	6.4%
Education	6.7%	257.7	8.5%
Retail Trade	6.0%	310.6	10.2%
Transport Services	5.7%	165.4	5.4%
Wholesale Trade	5.6%	113.4	3.7%
Public; Administration	5.0%	146.5	4.8%
Communications and IT	3.9%	57.0	1.9%
Real Estate	3.7%	43.6	1.4%
Administrative services	3.3%	119.0	3.9%
Accommodation and food services	2.9%	209.9	6.9%
Agriculture, forestry and fishing	2.8%	86.1	2.8%
Utilities	2.4%	39.4	1.3%
Mining	2.0%	11.0	0.4%
Arts and recreation	1.1%	63.2	2.1%
Other Services	–	115.1	3.8%
Source: Australian Bureau of Statistics. GSP as of June 2016. Employment as of Aug 2016.

The state of Victoria is the second largest economy in Australia after New South Wales, accounting for a quarter of the nation's gross domestic product. The total gross state product (GSP) at current prices for Victoria was A$459 billion in June 2020, with a GSP per capita of A$68,996.

=== Agriculture ===
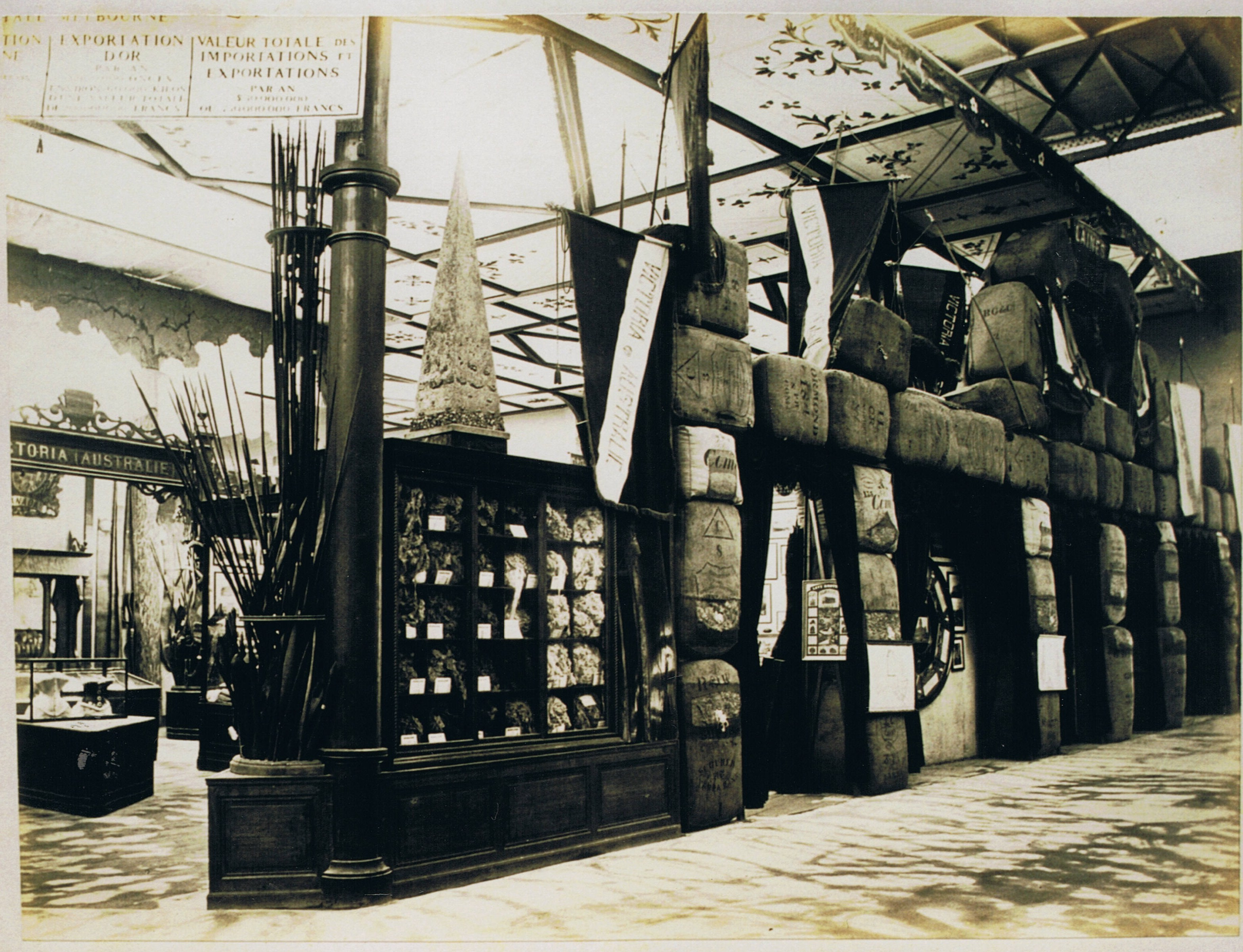
Victoria's stand at the Paris Exhibition Universal of 1867, showing bales of wool

Victoria is Australia's second-largest agricultural producer in gross value of production, representing about 25 percent of Australia's total food production. There are 67,600 people employed in the agricultural industry, making it the 6th largest employer in the state. There are about 21,600 farms in the state, managing more than 11.4 million hectares or 50% of the state's total landmass, of which 40% was used for cropping and 50% for grazing. Victorian farms produce nearly 90% of Australian pears and a third of apples. The main vegetable crops include asparagus, broccoli, carrots, potatoes, and tomatoes.

More than 14 million sheep and 5 million lambs graze over 10% of Victorian farms, mostly in the state's north and west. Pgt standard race 126 was the most common Stem Rust (Puccinia graminis f. sp. tritici) race here from 1929 to 1941, as it was for the whole of Australia. First detected on Tasmania in 1954, standard race 21 was the most common race by the next year in this state, the southern part of NSW, and Tasmania. Leaf Rust (P. triticina) is known to have been present here, and throughout the continent, at least since European colonization. P. triticina pathotype 104-2,3,(6),(7),11 was first found here in 1984 and has contributed to populations ever since. It is considered to be foreign to Australia due to a difference in pathogenicity and due to its unique Pgm2 c allele.

Victorian farms produce nearly 90% of Australian pears and a third of apples. It is also a leader in stone fruit (Prunus) production. The main vegetable crops include asparagus, broccoli, carrots, potatoes and tomatoes. Last year, 121,200 metric tons (133,600 short tons) of pears and 270,000 metric tons (300,000 short tons) of tomatoes were produced. More than 14 million sheep and 5 million lambs graze over 10% of Victorian farms, mostly in the state's north and west. In 2004, nearly 10 million lambs and sheep were slaughtered for local consumption and export. Victoria also exports live sheep to the Middle East for meat and to the rest of the world for breeding. More than 108,000 metric tons (119,000 short tons) of wool clip was also produced—one-fifth of the Australian total.

Victoria is the centre of dairy farming in Australia. It is home to 60% of Australia's 3 million dairy cattle and produces nearly two-thirds of the nation's milk, almost 6.4 billion litres (1.7 billion US gallons). The state also has 2.4 million beef cattle, with more than 2.2 million cattle and calves slaughtered each year. In 2003–04, Victorian commercial fishing crews and aquaculture industry produced 11,634 metric tons (12,824 short tons) of seafood valued at nearly A$109 million. Blacklipped abalone is the mainstay of the catch, bringing in A$46 million, followed by southern rock lobster worth A$13.7 million. Most abalone and rock lobster is exported to Asia.

Most of Australia – including this state – imposed a moratorium on GM canola in 2003 to consider the positives and negatives. After consideration the ban here was lifted in 2008 and the state's produced a review of the effects of the moratorium and the expected economic and other effects of adoption or failure to adopt GM canola. The government finds a benefit of AUS$45 per hectare ($18/acre)/season over conventional.

Late in 2019, the COVID-19 pandemic began, and Australian agriculture was heavily impacted by the resulting supply chain issues. The scarcity of freight space and disruption to Chinese New Year purchases was particularly painful, with China being Australia's largest export market and a particularly large buyer of live seafood. As of 2022 there are almost 100 strawberry farms here, most close to Melbourne CBD in the Yarra Valley. They are represented by the Victorian Strawberries organisation, who recommend varieties for production.

=== Manufacturing ===
Victoria has a diverse range of manufacturing enterprises and Melbourne is considered Australia's most important industrial city. The post-World War II manufacturing boom was fuelled by international investment, attracted to the state by the availability of cheap land close to the city and inexpensive energy from the Latrobe Valley. Victoria produced 26.4% of total manufacturing output in Australia in 2015–16, behind New South Wales at 32.4%.

Machinery and equipment manufacturing is the state's most valuable manufacturing activity, followed by food and beverage products, petrochemicals and chemicals. Prominent manufacturing plants in the state include the Portland and Point Henry aluminium smelters, owned by Alcoa; Geelong and Altona oil refineries; a major petrochemical facility at Laverton; and Victorian-based CSL, a global biotechnology company that produces vaccines and plasma products, among others. Victoria also plays an important role in providing goods for the defence industry.

Victoria proportionally relies on manufacturing more than any other state in Australia, constituting 8.6% of total state product; slightly higher than South Australia at 8.0%. However, this proportion has been declining for three decades; in 1990 at the time of the early 1990s recession manufacturing constituted 20.3% of total state output. Manufacturing output peaked in absolute terms in 2008, reaching $28.8 billion and has slowly fallen over the decade to $26.8 billion in 2016 (−0.77% per annum). Since 1990, manufacturing employment has also fallen in both aggregate (367,700 to 274,400 workers) and proportional (17.8% to 9.0%) terms. The strong Australian dollar as a result of the 2000s mining boom, small population and isolation, high wage base and the general shift of manufacturing production towards developing countries have been cited as some of the reasons for this decline.

Historically, Victoria has been a hub for the manufacturing plants of the major car brands Ford, Toyota and Holden; however, closure announcements by all three companies in the 2010s has meant Australia will completely lose their car manufacturing industry by the end of 2017. Holden's announcement occurred in May 2013 following Ford's decision in December the previous year (Ford's Victorian plants, in Broadmeadows and Geelong, closed in October 2016). Toyota followed suit in February 2014 with an expected announcement as without Holden or Ford, local supply chains would struggle to create the economics of scale required to supply one manufacturer.

=== Land ===
Victoria adopted the Torrens system of land registration with the Real Property Act 1862. The Torrens system did not replace the common law system but applied only to new land grants and to land that has been voluntarily registered under the Act, and its successors. The common law system continues to apply to all other private landholdings. Crown land held in Victoria is managed under the Crown Land (Reserves) Act 1978 and the Land Act 1958.

=== Mining ===
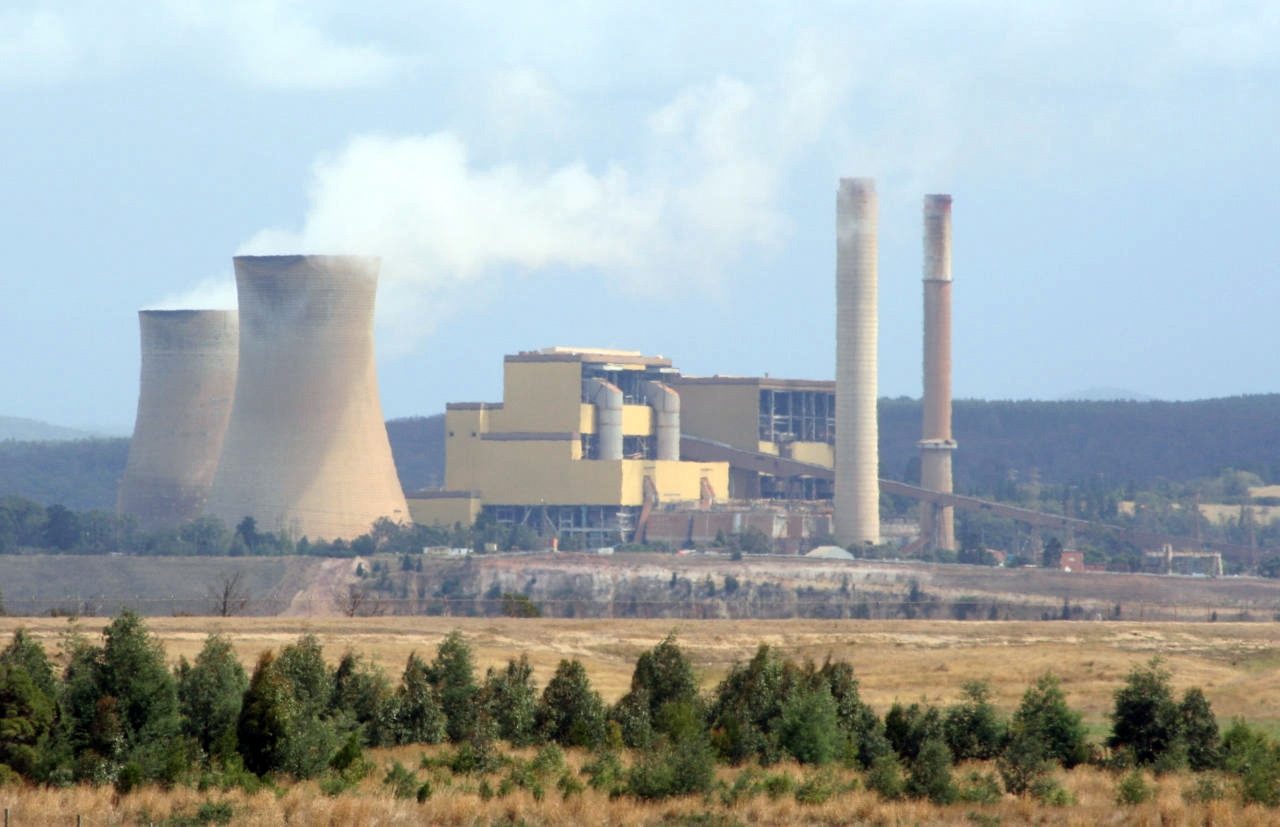
Yallourn Power Station in the Latrobe Valley

Mining in Victoria contributes around A$6 billion to the gross state product (~2%) but employs less than 1% of workers. The Victorian mining industry is concentrated on energy producing minerals, with brown coal, petroleum and gas accounting for nearly 90% of local production. The oil and gas industries are centred off the coast of Gippsland in the state's east, while brown coal mining and power generation is based in the Latrobe Valley.

In 1985, oil production from the offshore Gippsland Basin peaked to an annual average of 450,000 barrels (72,000 m^{3}) per day. In 2005–2006, the average daily oil production has declined to 83,000 bbl (13,200 m^{3})/d, but despite the decline Victoria still produces almost 19.5% of crude oil in Australia. In the 2005–06 fiscal year, the average gas production was over 700 million cubic feet (20,000,000 m^{3}) per day (M cuft/d) and represented 18% of the total national gas sales, with demand growing at 2% per year. Campaigning resulted in a prohibition on onshore gas exploration and production in Victoria in 2014,. This was partially lifted in 2021 but the state retains a constitutional ban on fracking.

Brown coal is Victoria's leading mineral, with 66 million tonnes mined each year for electricity generation in the Latrobe Valley, Gippsland. The region is home to the world's largest known reserves of brown coal. Despite being the historic centre of Australia's gold rush, Victoria today contributes a mere 1% of national gold production. Victoria also produces limited amounts of gypsum and kaolin. Victoria's gold production is mostly derived from the Fosterville and Stawell Gold Minees.

=== Tourism ===
Tourism is a significant industry in the state of Victoria, Australia. The country's second most-populous city, Melbourne was visited by 2.7 million international overnight visitors and 13.5 million domestic overnight visitors during the year ending December 2025. Named the world's most liveable city from 2011 to 2017 and again in 2026, Melbourne's culture and lifestyle have been increasingly promoted internationally, leading to year-on-year growth of international visitors by 4.4% in 2025. Some major tourist destinations in Victoria are:

- The metropolis of Melbourne, particular its inner city suburbs (known also for shopping tourism) and the attractions of its city centre such as Melbourne Zoo, Melbourne Museum, the Melbourne Aquarium and Scienceworks, tourism precincts such as Melbourne Docklands, Southbank and St Kilda as well as cultural and sporting tourist icons such as Arts Centre Melbourne, the East End Theatre District, the National Gallery of Victoria, the Melbourne Cricket Ground, also known as the MCG, and the Eureka Tower, with the highest observation deck in the Southern Hemisphere, Skydeck 88
- Victoria has more than 2,000 km (1,200 mi) of coastline with hundreds of beaches.
- The Goldfields region, featuring the historic cities of Ballarat, Beechworth, Bendigo, Castlemaine, Maldon and Daylesford
- Natural attractions, such as The Twelve Apostles, Wilsons Promontory, The Grampians, the fairy penguins (particularly at Phillip Island and St Kilda), the Buchan Caves and the Gippsland Lakes
- The Dandenong Ranges (in particular the Puffing Billy Railway)
- Healesville Sanctuary, which specialises in local Australian species
- Towns along the Murray River and Riverina including Echuca and Mildura
- Geelong and its famous Waterfront, Eastern Beach and Geelong West's Pakington Street
- The Bellarine Peninsula which features vineyards and historic resort towns such as Queenscliff, Drysdale and Portarlington
- The Werribee Park Mansion and Werribee Open Range Zoo
- The Surf Coast which features beaches such as Bells Beach, Torquay and Lorne
- Mornington Peninsula, particularly for its wineries in Red Hill and secluded beaches in Mount Eliza and Mornington, The Pillars in Mount Martha, Arthur's Seat and the coastal attractions of Portsea, Sorrento and Flinders
- Yarra Valley (in particular Healesville Sanctuary and wineries)
- Great Ocean Road, which features The Twelve Apostles, historic towns of Port Fairy and Portland, cliffs and whale watching
- The Victorian Alpine Region (part of the Australian Alps), particularly for skiing
- The Central Victorian Highlands, "High country" are very well known for winter sports and bushwalking
- Wine regions across the entire state.

Other popular tourism activities are gliding, hang-gliding, hot air ballooning and scuba diving. Major events that explore cultural diversity, music and sports play a big part in Victoria's tourism. The Formula One Grand Prix in Albert Park, V8 Supercars and Australian Motorcycle Grand Prix at Phillip Island, the Grand Annual Steeplechase at Warrnambool and the Australian International Airshow at Avalon and numerous local festivals such as the popular Port Fairy Folk Festival, Queenscliff Music Festival, Pako Festa in Geelong West, Bells Beach Surf Classic and the Bright Autumn Festival amongst others.

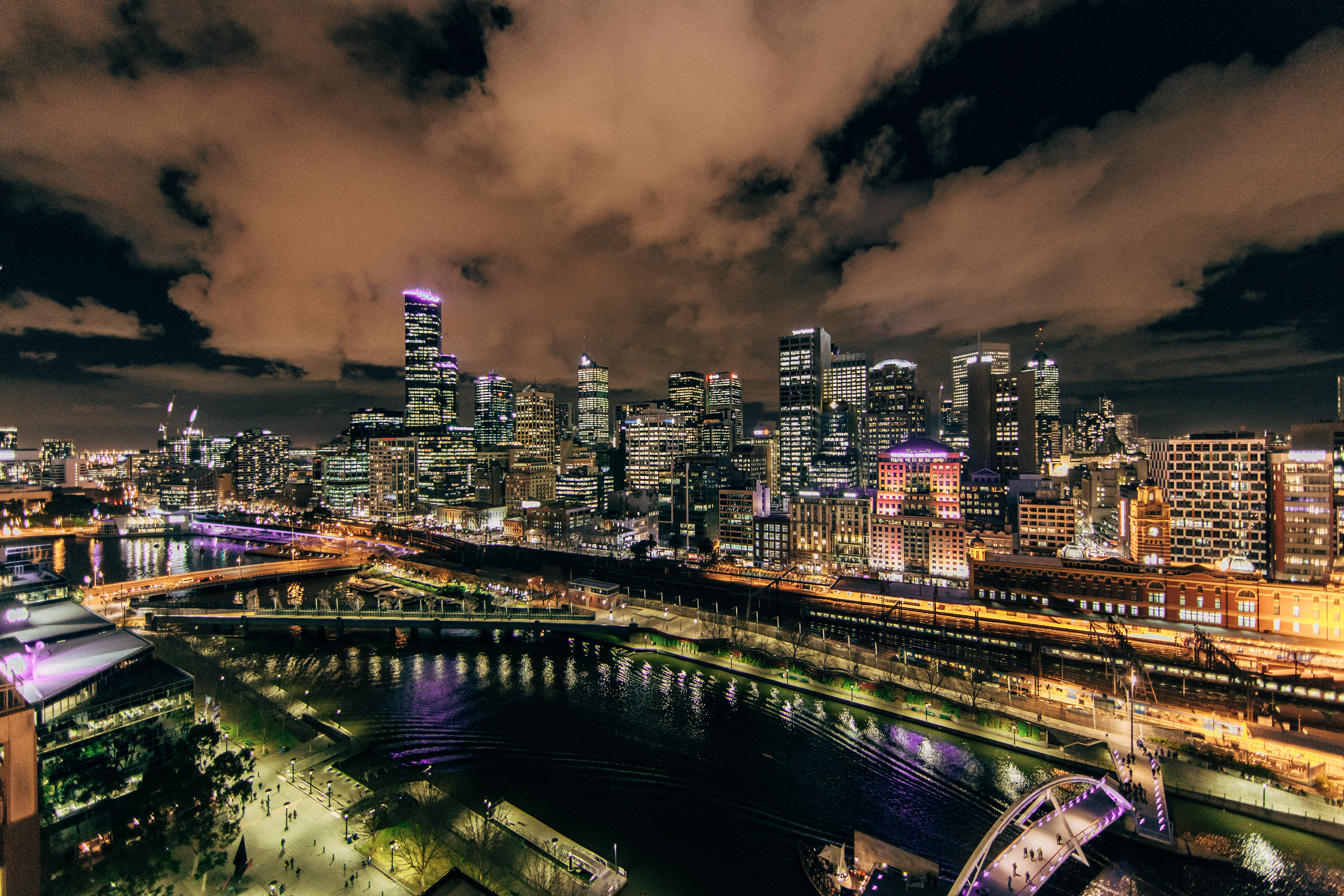
The Melbourne skyline at night

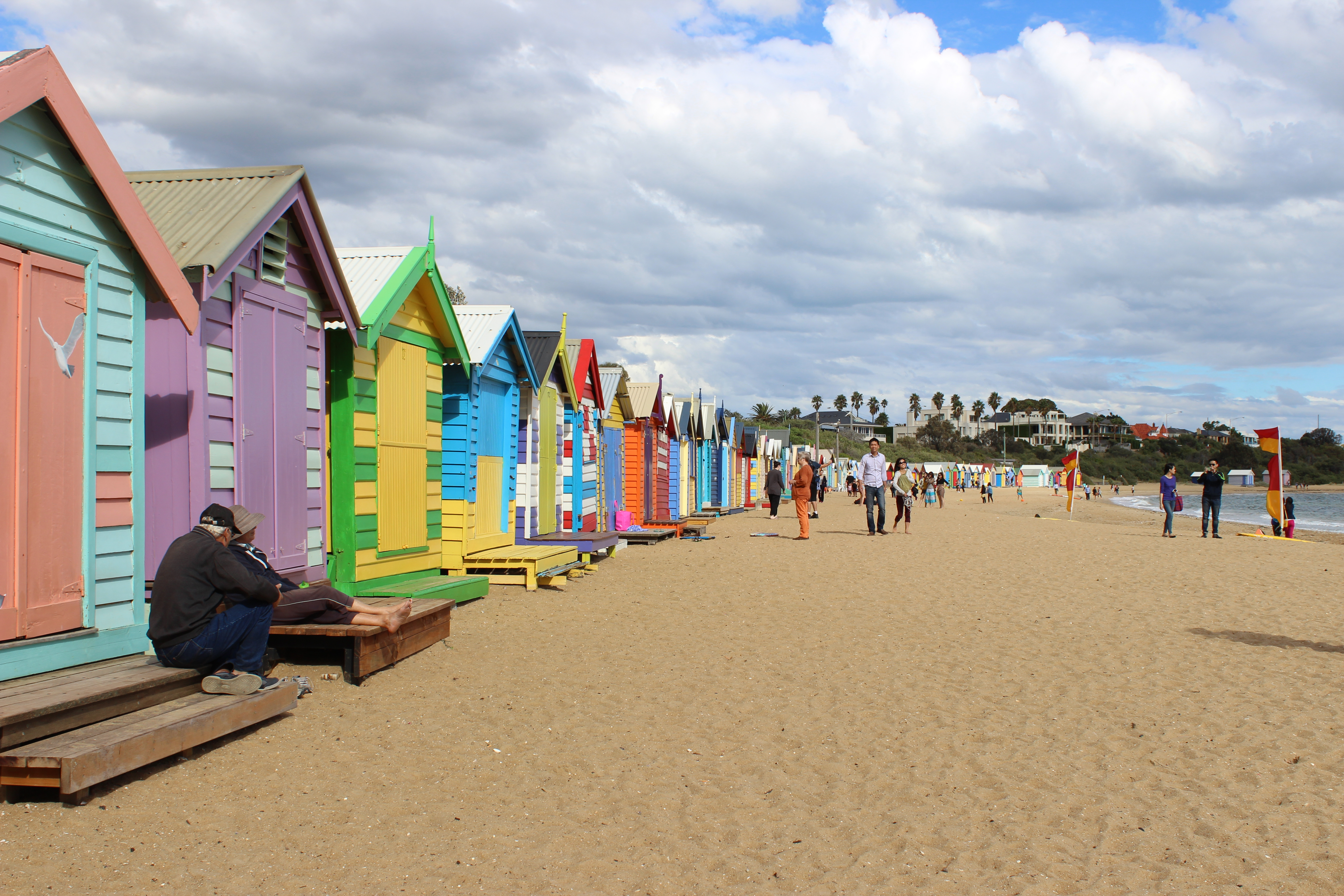
Brighton Beach bathing boxes

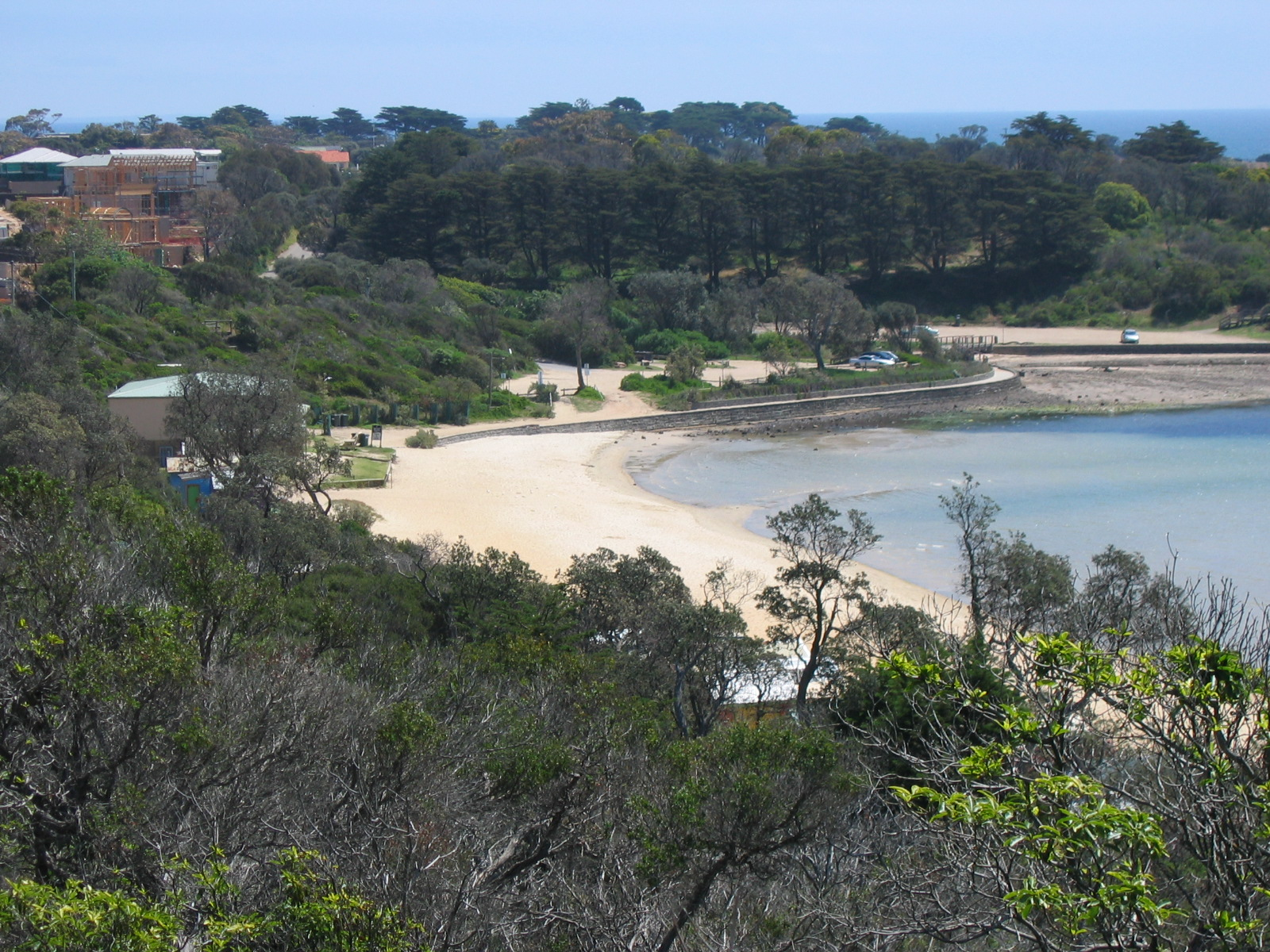
Mornington Mills Beach

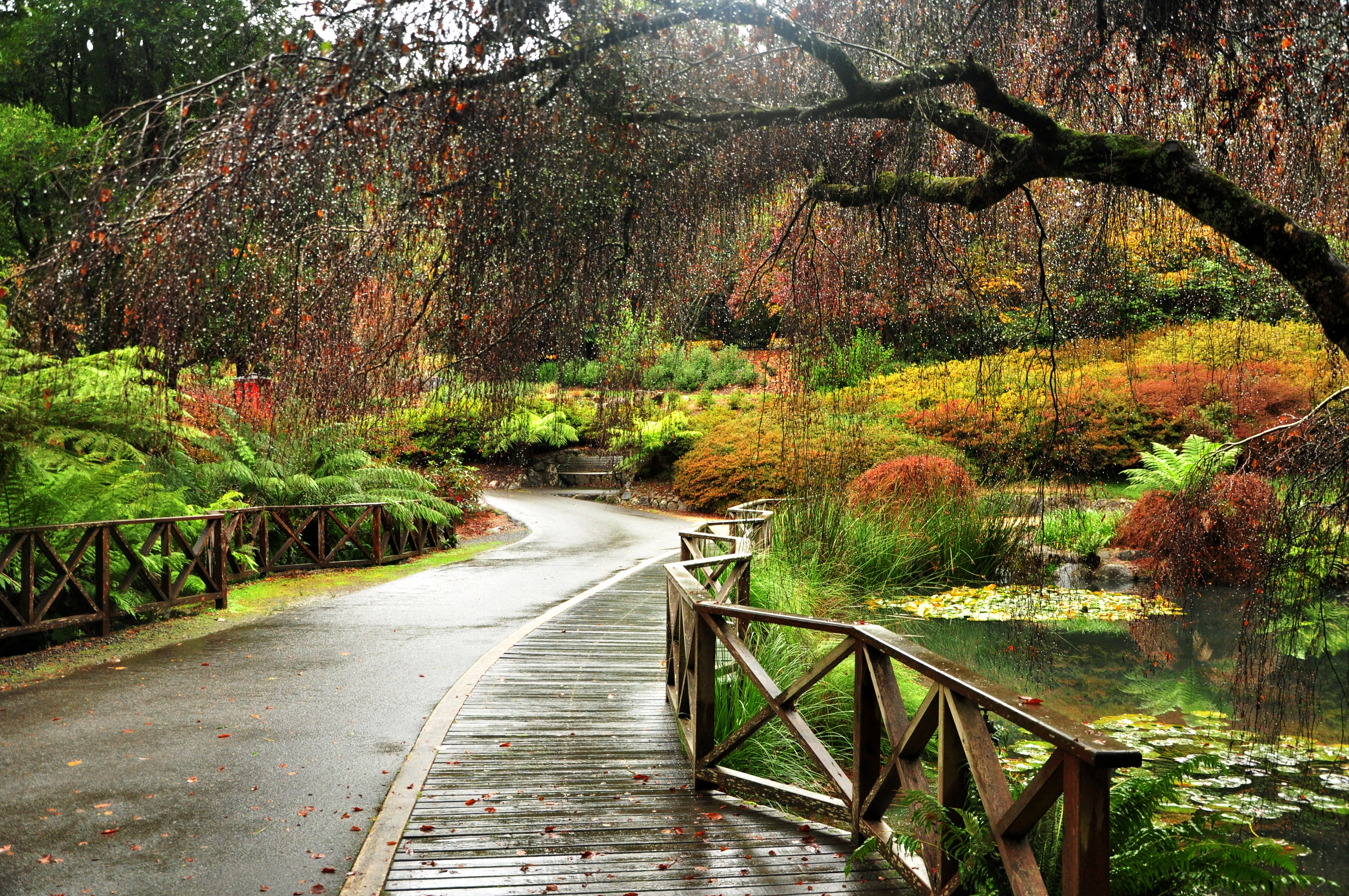
Autumn in the Dandenong Ranges

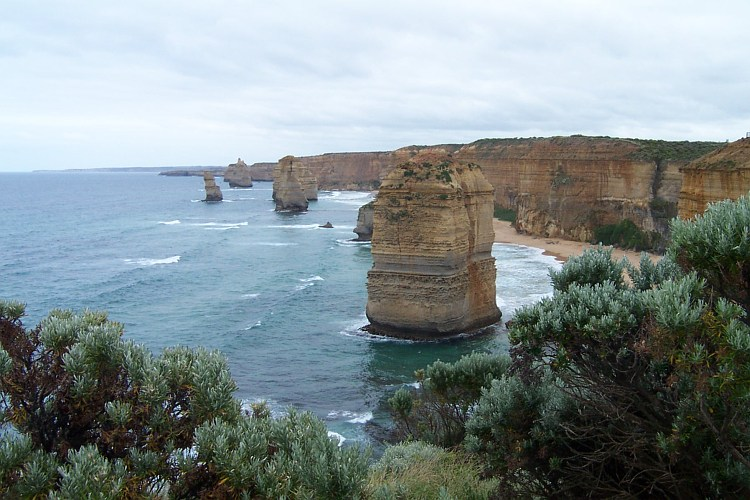
The Twelve Apostles

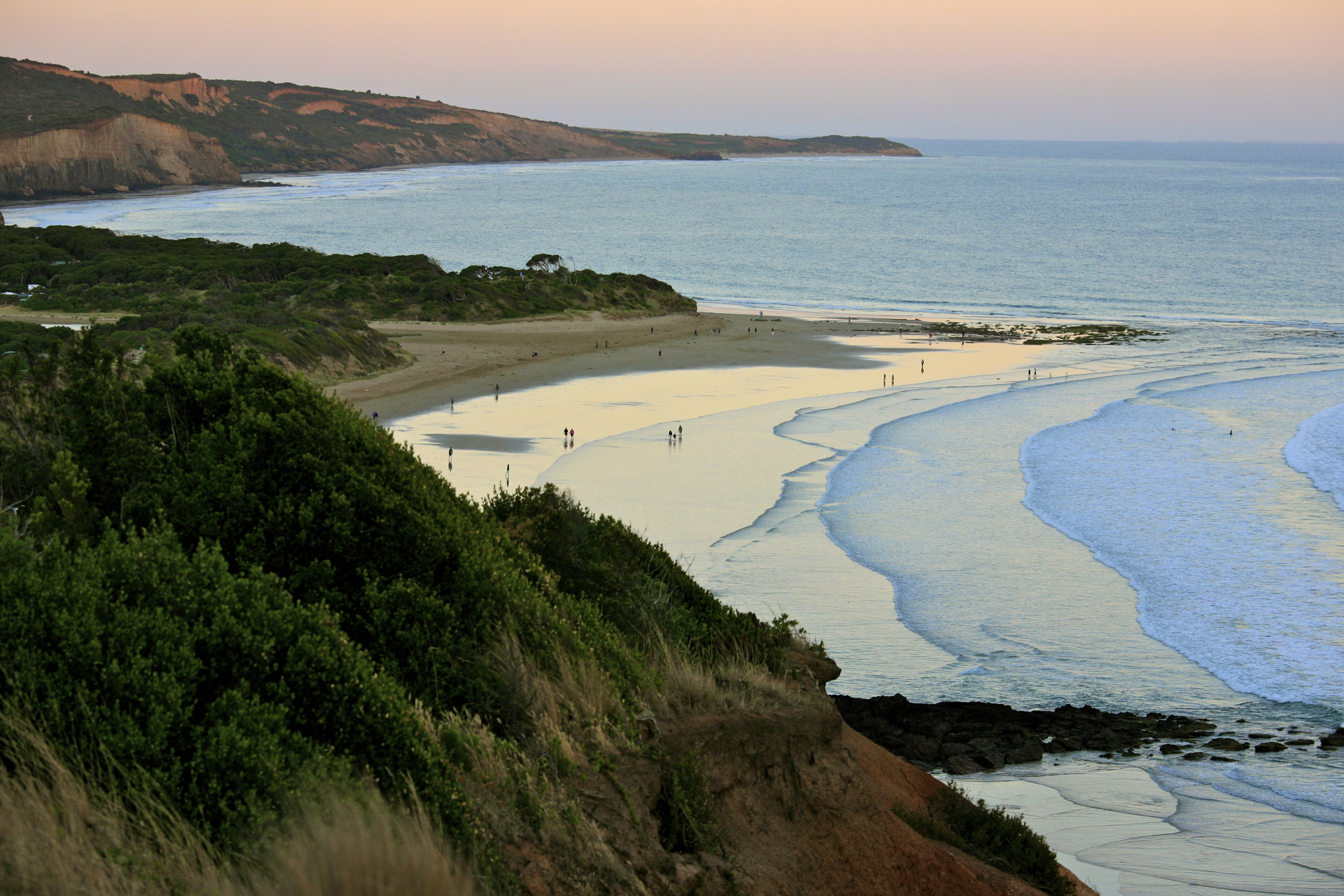
Jan Juc, Torquay

== Transport ==
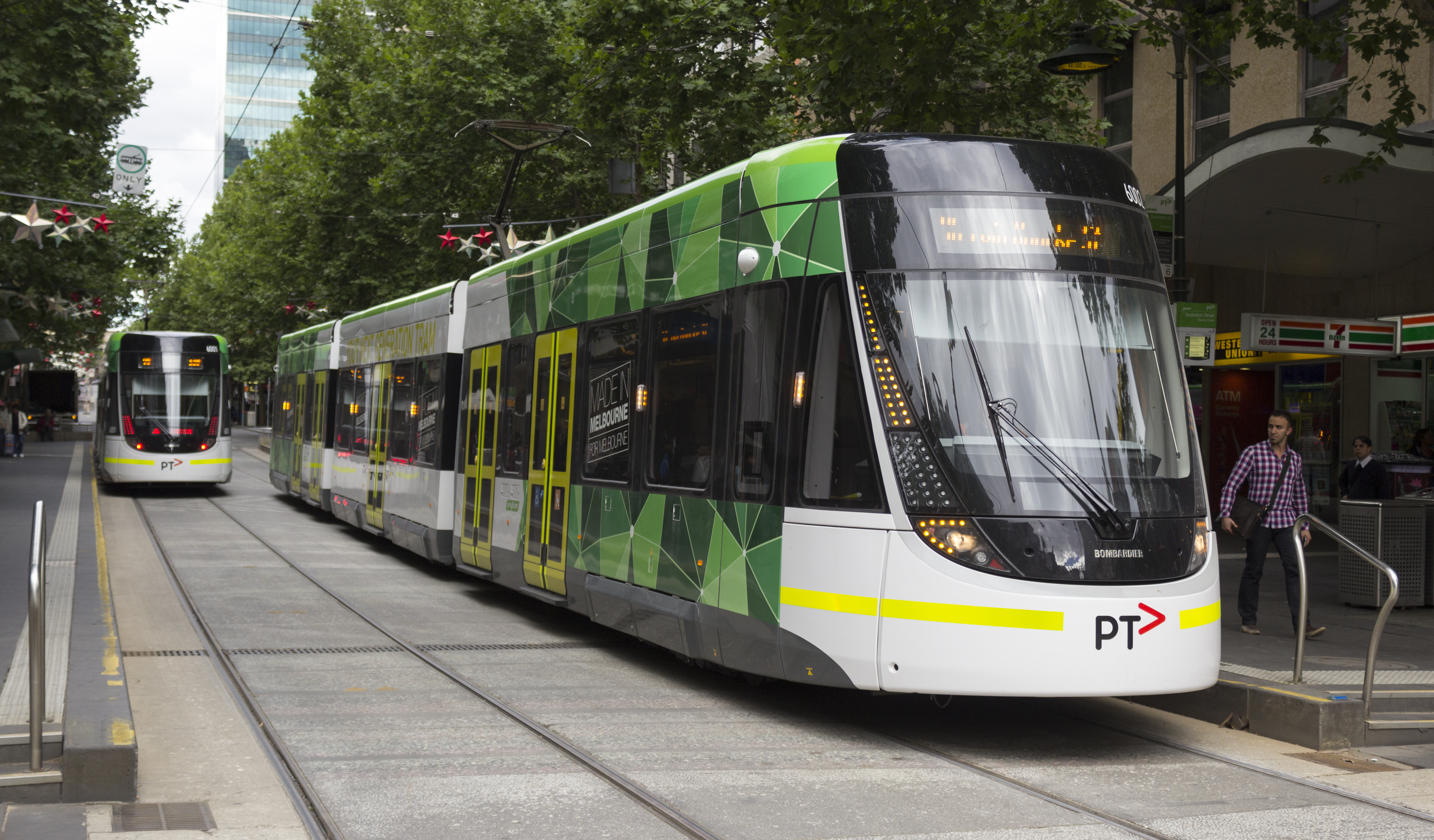
Two E-Class trams on Bourke St on the Melbourne tram network

Victoria has the highest population density in any state in Australia, with population centres spread out over most of the state; only the far northwest and the Victorian Alps lack permanent settlement. As of October 2013, smoking tobacco is prohibited in the sheltered areas of train stations, and tram and bus stops, as is the use of e-cigarettes. Between 2012 and 2013, 2002 people were issued with infringement notices. The state government announced a plan in October 2013 to prohibit smoking on all Victorian railway station platforms and raised tram stops.

The Victorian road network services the population centres, with highways generally radiating from Melbourne and other major cities and rural centres with secondary roads interconnecting the highways to each other. Many of the highways are built to freeway standard ("M" freeways), while most are generally sealed and of reasonable quality.

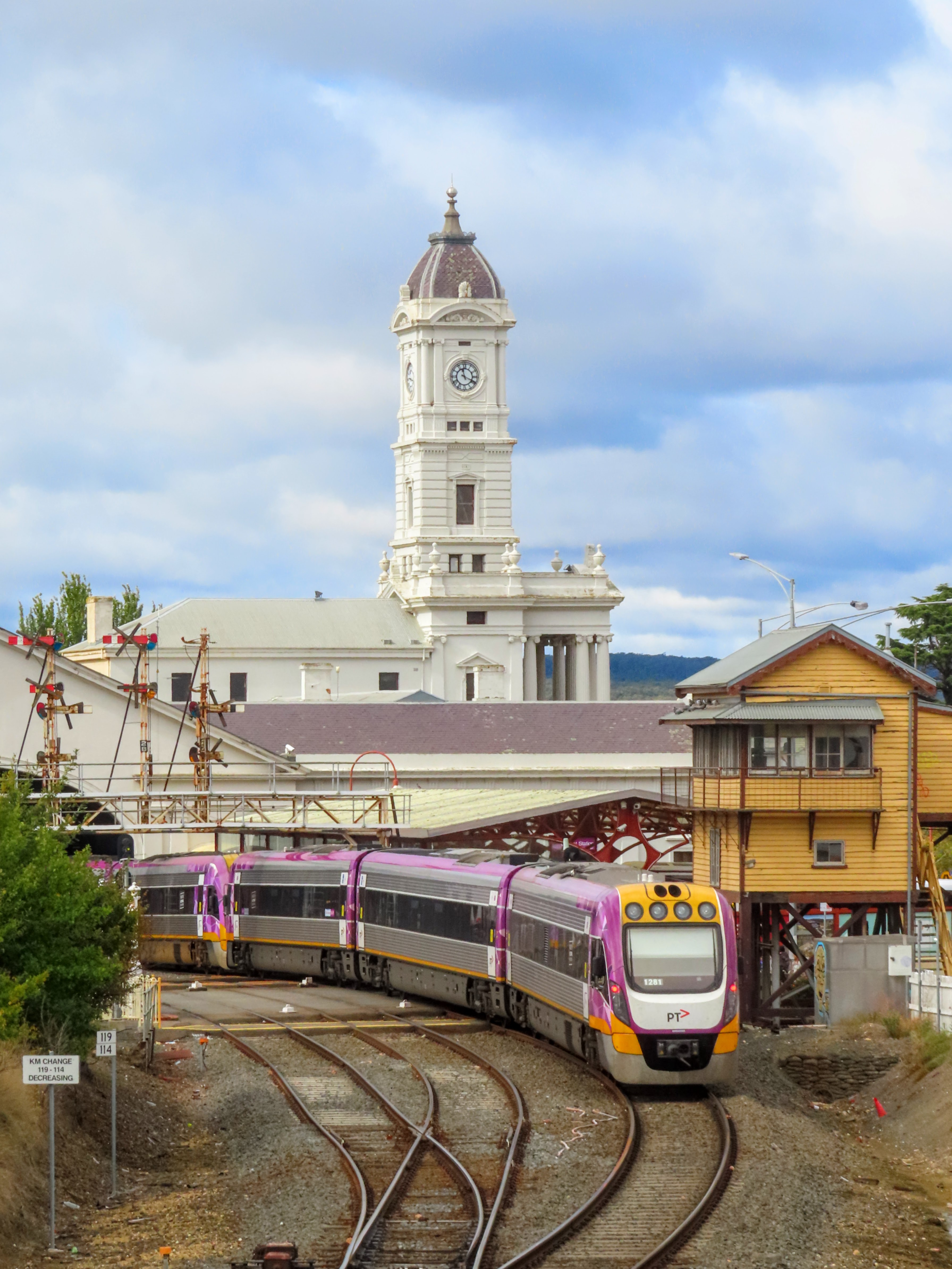
A V/Line VLocity diesel train at Ballarat station

Rail transport in Victoria is provided by several private and public railway operators who operate over government-owned lines. Major operators include: Metro Trains Melbourne which runs an extensive, electrified, passenger system throughout Melbourne and suburbs; V/Line which is now owned by the Victorian Government, operates a concentrated service to major regional centres, as well as long-distance services on other lines; Pacific National, CFCL Australia which operate freight services; Great Southern Rail which operates The Overland Melbourne—Adelaide; and NSW TrainLink which operates XPTs Melbourne—Sydney.

There are also several smaller freight operators and numerous tourist railways operating over lines which were once parts of a state-owned system. Victorian lines mainly use the 1,600 mm (5 ft 3 in) broad gauge. However, the interstate trunk routes, as well as a number of freight lines in the north and west of the state have been converted to 1,435 mm (4 ft 8 1/2 in) standard gauge. Two tourist railways operate over 760 mm (2 ft 6 in) narrow gauge lines, which are the remnants of five formerly government-owned lines which were built in mountainous areas.

Melbourne has the world's largest tram network, currently operated by Yarra Trams. As well as being a popular form of public transport, over the last few decades trams have become one of Melbourne's major tourist attractions. There are also tourist trams operating over portions of the former Ballarat and Bendigo systems. There are three tramway museums dedicated to the history of Melbourne's tram network, the Tramway Museum Society of Victoria in Bylands, Melbourne Tramcar Preservation Association in Haddon, and the Melbourne Tram Museum inside the historic tram depot in Hawthorn which include examples of preserved trams used throughout the system’s history.

Melbourne Airport is the major domestic and international gateway for the state. Avalon Airport is the state's second busiest airport, which complements Essendon and Moorabbin Airports to see the remainder of Melbourne's air traffic. Hamilton Airport, Mildura Airport, Mount Hotham and Portland Airport are the remaining airports with scheduled domestic flights. There are no fewer than 27 other airports in the state with no scheduled flights. The Port of Melbourne is the largest port for containerised and general cargo in Australia, and is located in Melbourne on the mouth of the Yarra River, which is at the head of Port Phillip. Additional seaports are at Westernport, Geelong, and Portland.

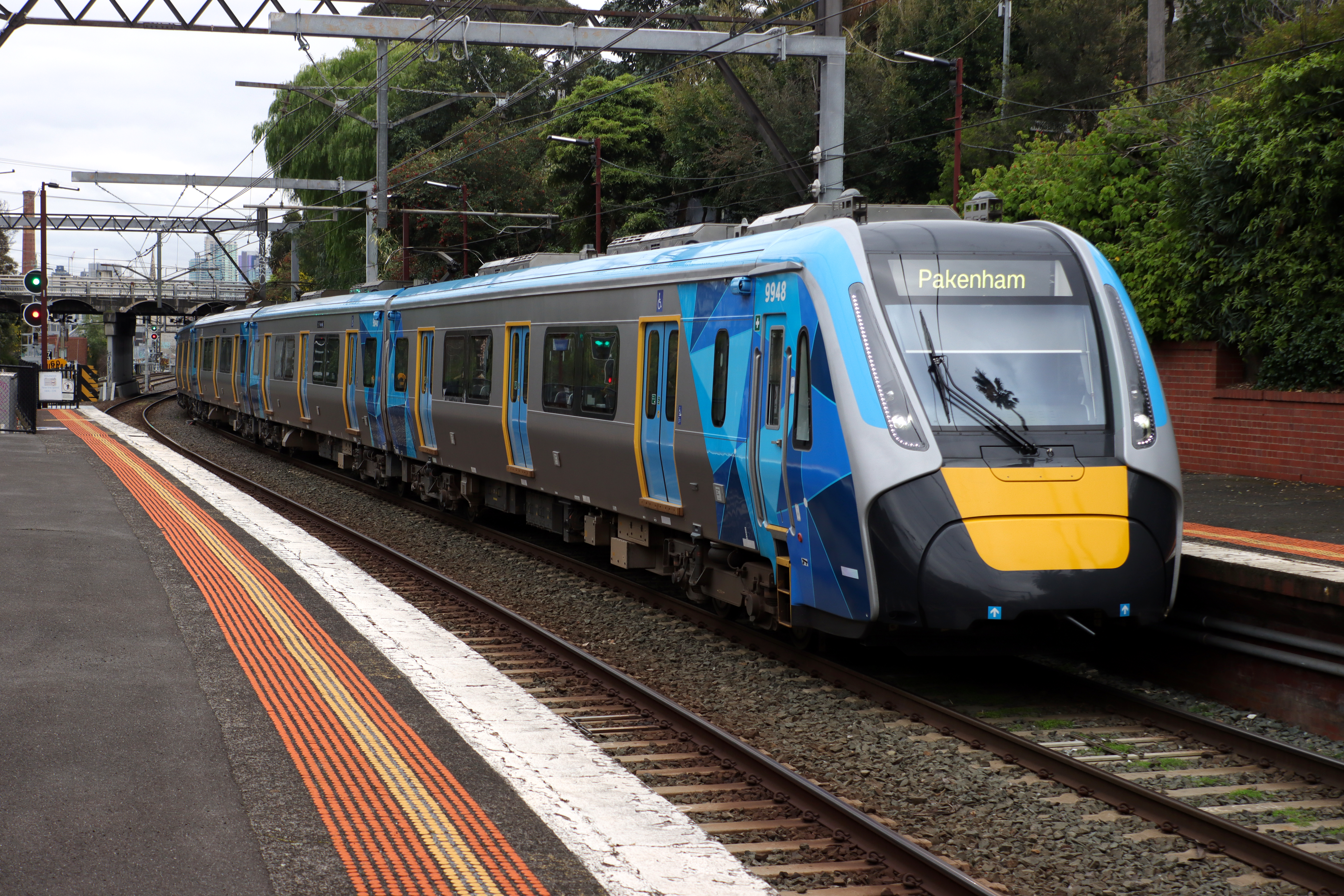
A High Capacity Metro Train on the Melbourne metropolitan train network operated by Metro Trains Melbourne. The trains have been introduced as part of the Metro Tunnel project.

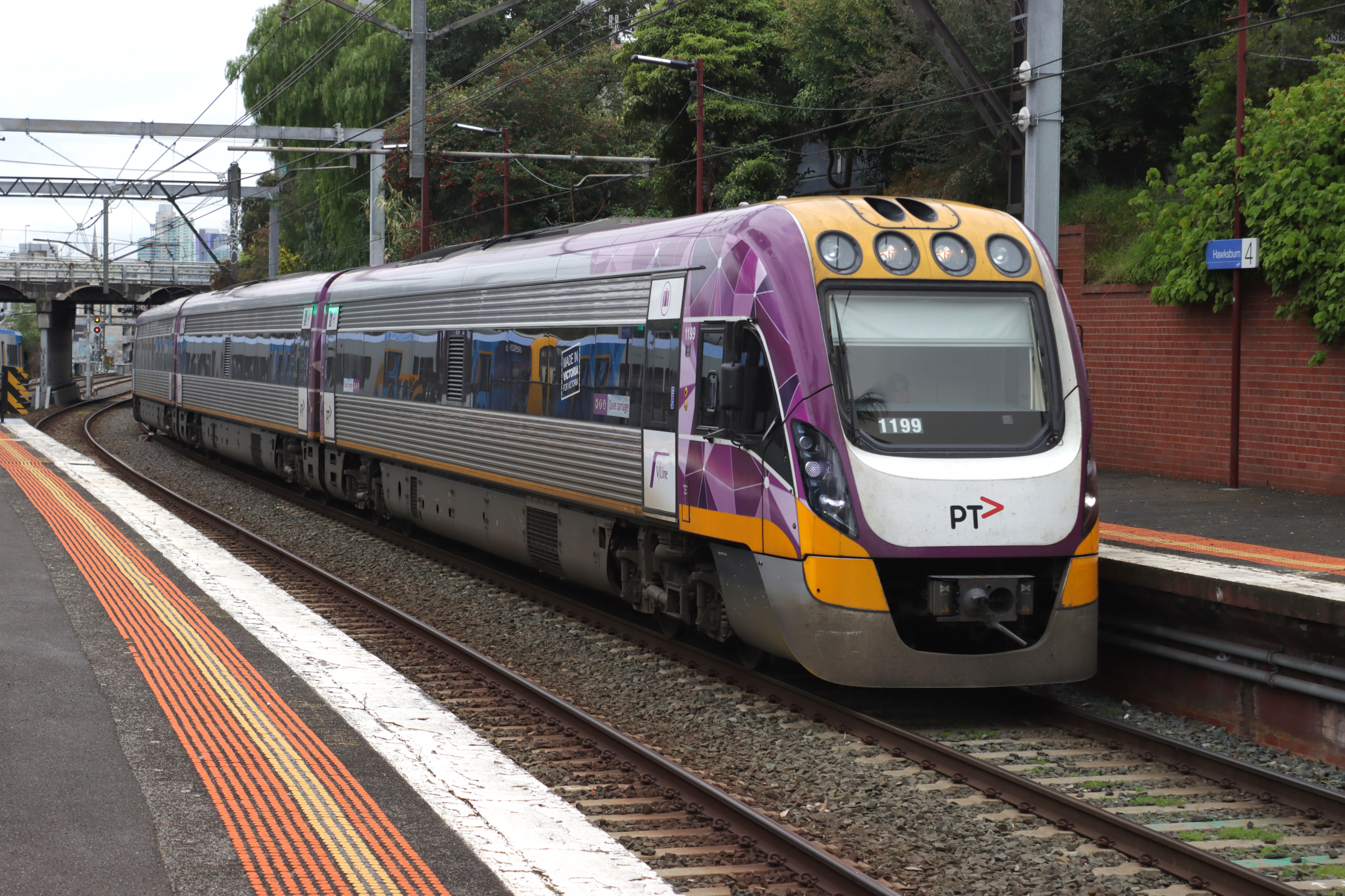
A VLocity train at Hawksburn station. V/Line is a government-owned train and coach service provider in Victoria, providing inter-city services to a number of regional cities in the state.

== Utilities ==
=== Energy ===
Victoria's major utilities include a collection of brown-coal-fired power stations, particularly in the Latrobe Valley. One of these was the recently decommissioned Hazelwood Power Station, which was number 1 on the worldwide List of least carbon efficient power stations. The Victorian government is aiming to cut 40.6 megatonnes of greenhouse gas emissions by 2025.

=== Water ===
Victoria's water infrastructure includes a series of dams and reservoirs, predominantly in Central Victoria, that hold and collect water for much of the state. The water collected is of a very high quality and requires little chlorination treatment, giving the water a taste more like water collected in a rainwater tank. In regional areas however, such as in the west of the state, chlorination levels are much higher. The Victorian Water Grid consists of a number of new connections and pipelines being built across the State. This allows water to be moved around Victoria to where it is needed most and reduces the impact of localised droughts in an era thought to be influenced by climate change. Major projects already completed as part of the Grid include the Wimmera Mallee Pipeline and the Goldfields Superpipe.

== Sport ==
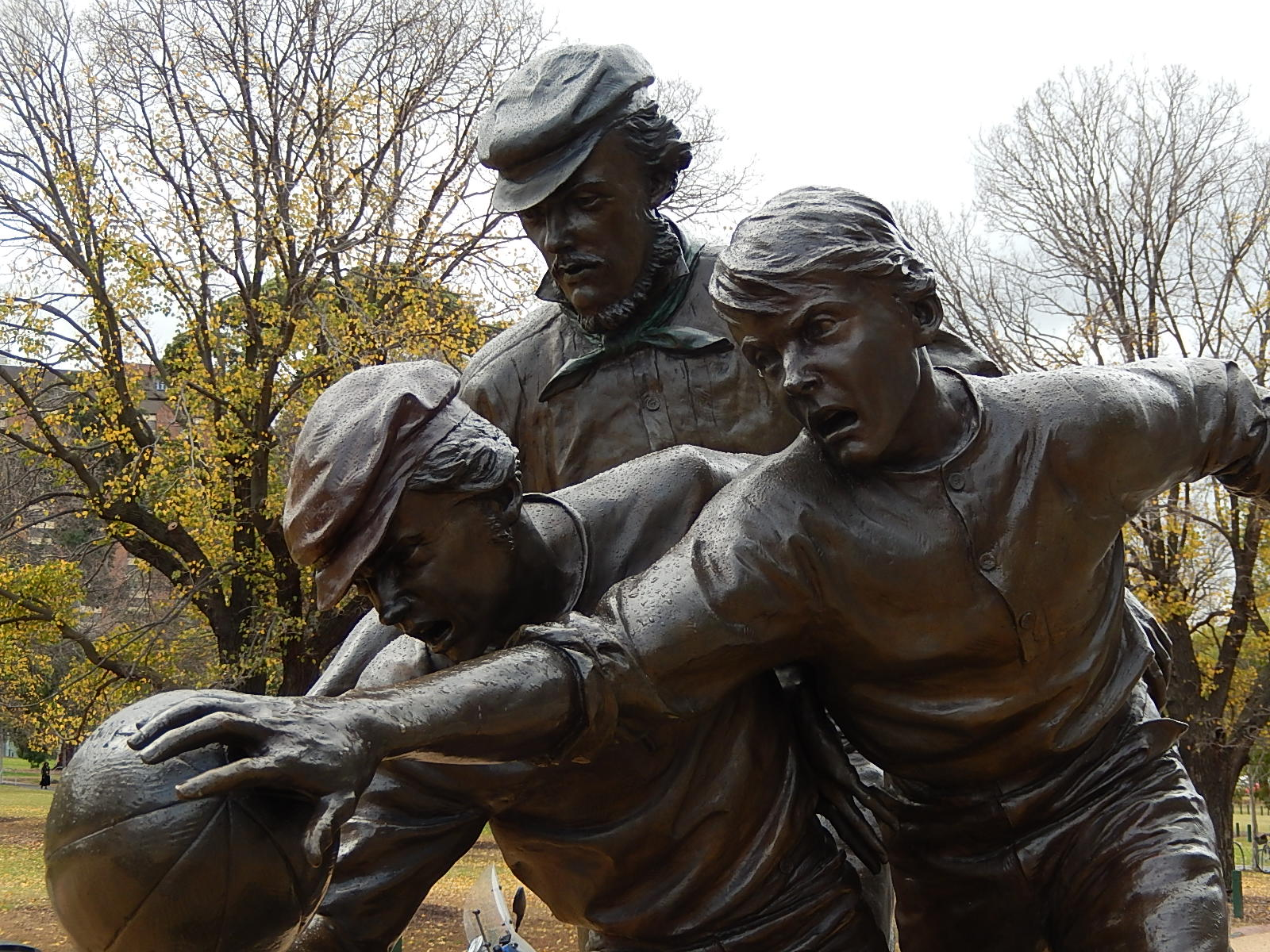
Statue outside the Melbourne Cricket Ground commemorating the origins of Australian rules football

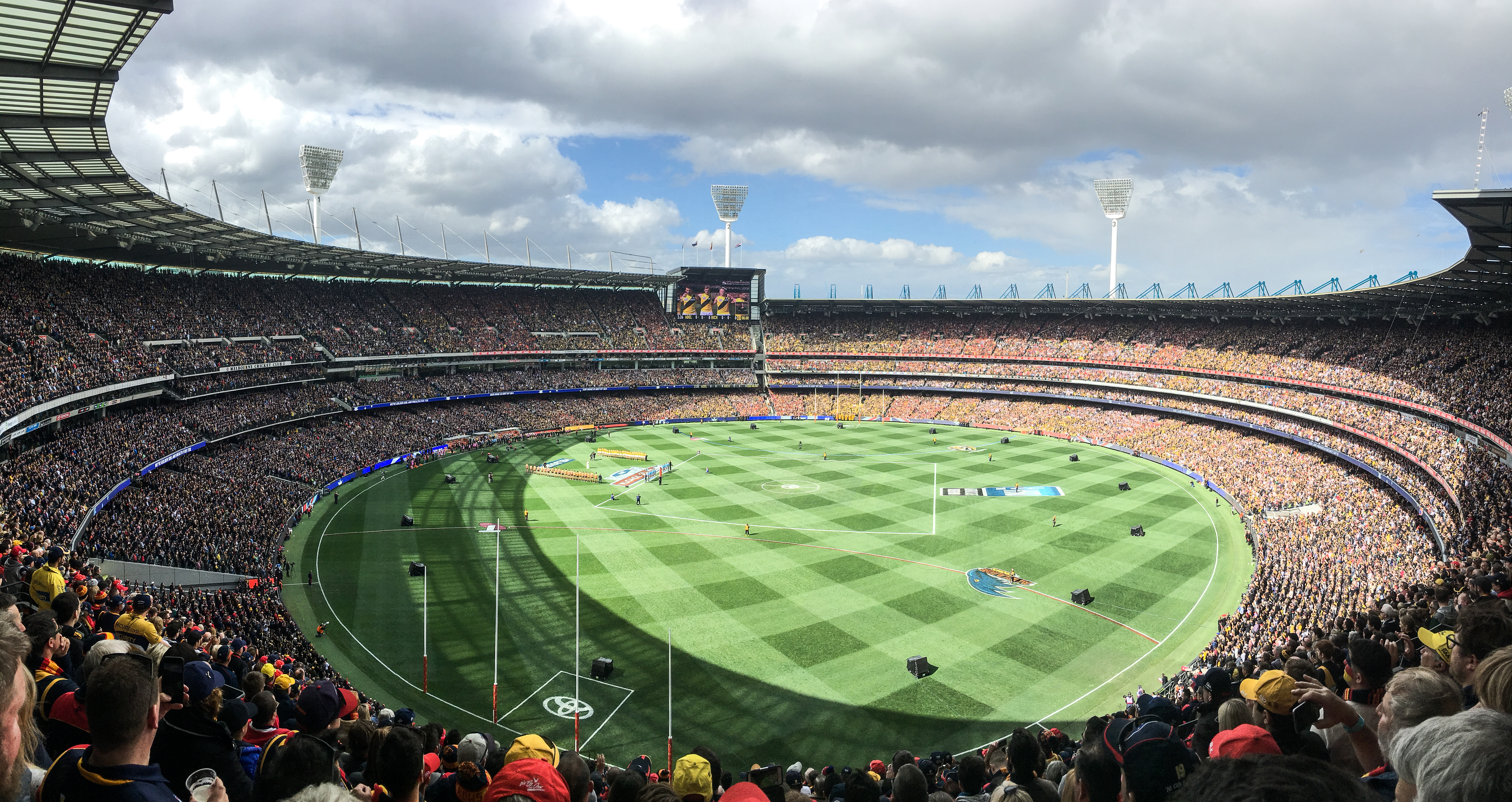
Panorama of the MCG during the AFL Grand Final on 30 September 2017

Victoria is the home of Australian rules football, with ten of the 18 Australian Football League (AFL) clubs based in the state. The AFL Grand Final is traditionally held at the Melbourne Cricket Ground on the last Saturday of September. The state has a public holiday the day before the Grand Final, which coincides with the AFL Grand Final parade. The MCG is sometimes called the spiritual home of Australian rules football.

The Victorian cricket team play in the national Sheffield Shield cricket competition. Victoria is represented in the National Rugby League by the Melbourne Storm. Prior to their axing at the end of the 2024 season, Victoria was represented by the Melbourne Rebels in the Super Rugby. It is represented in the National Basketball League by Melbourne United and South East Melbourne Phoenix. It is also represented in soccer by Melbourne Victory, Melbourne City and Western United in the A-League. Melbourne has held the 1956 Summer Olympics, 2006 Commonwealth Games and the FINA World Swimming Championship.

Melbourne is also home to the Australian Open tennis tournament in January each year, which is the first of the world's four Grand Slam tennis tournaments, as well as the Formula One Australian Grand Prix, which is, on an annual basis, usually held in March or April. It hosted the Australian Masters golf tournament from 1979 to 2015. Victoria's Bells Beach hosts one of the world's longest-running surfing competition, the Bells Beach SurfClassic, which is part of The ASP World Tour. The Melbourne Vixens and Melbourne Mavericks represent Victoria in the Super Netball league.

Victoria's Phillip Island is home of the Phillip Island Grand Prix Circuit which hosts the Australian motorcycle Grand Prix which features MotoGP (the world's premier motorcycling class), as well as the Australian round of the World Superbike Championship and the domestic V8 Supercar racing, which also visits Sandown Raceway and the rural Winton Motor Raceway circuit. Australia's most prestigious footrace, the Stawell Gift, is an annual event. Victoria is also home to the Aussie Millions poker tournament, the tournament with the highest potential proceeds in the Southern Hemisphere.

The main horse racing tracks in Victoria are Caulfield Racecourse, Flemington Racecourse and Sandown Racecourse. The Melbourne Spring Racing Carnival is one of the biggest horse racing events in the world and is one of the world's largest sporting events. The main race is for the $6 million Melbourne Cup, and crowds for the carnival usually exceed 700,000. Victoria was due to host the 2026 Commonwealth Games but withdrew on 18 July 2023 as a result of increased costs of holding the event.

Major professional clubs and teams include:

- Australian rules football (AFL): Carlton, Collingwood, Essendon, Geelong Cats, Hawthorn, Melbourne, North Melbourne, Richmond, St Kilda, Western Bulldogs
- Basketball (NBL): Melbourne United, South East Melbourne Phoenix
- Cricket (BBL): Melbourne Renegades, Melbourne Stars
- Cricket (Sheffield Shield and Marsh One-Day Cup): Victoria cricket team
- Netball (Super Netball): Melbourne Vixens, Collingwood Magpies
- Rugby league (NRL): Melbourne Storm
- Rugby union (Super Rugby): Melbourne Rebels
- Soccer (A-League): Melbourne City, Melbourne Victory, Western United

== Sister states ==
Victoria has four sister states:

- Jiangsu, China (1979)
- Aichi Prefecture, Japan (1980)
- Busan, South Korea (1994)
- Sichuan, China (2016)

== See also ==
- Geography of Victoria
- List of highways in Victoria
- Outline of Victoria
- Protected areas of Victoria
- Vicmap Topographic Map Series
- List of places in Victoria by population
