= Vicmap Topographic Map Series =

Vicmap Topographic Map Series is a series of topographic maps covering the State of Victoria, Australia. Created and maintained by the State of Victoria, the map series is currently in a transition phase, with traditional Vicmap Topographic maps being gradually replaced with a new map series.

== History ==
The traditional set of Vicmap Topographic maps consist of approximately 850 1:25000 and 1:50000 hardcopy topographic map sheets printed and made available for sale to the general public. These map sheets cover 80% of Victoria. Most of the mapsheets are single format at a scale of 1:25000. Less inhabited areas of the state are covered by double format 1:25000 and 1:50000 mapsheets. All of these maps were produced using traditional cartographic methods, with the majority being last updated in the 1970s and 1980s.

== New Series ==
In 2004 a proposal was put forward by Spatial Information Infrastructure to create a new series of Topographic Maps. There were two main reasons for a new series to be developed. Firstly, the majority of the old map series utilises the now obsolete AGD66 datum and secondly, the bulk of the old map series is out of date, with 40% of these map sheets being 21 to 30 years old, 50% 11 to 20 years old and only 10% less than 10 years old. The new series utilises the new Geodetic Datum of Australia 1994 and is currently being created using a Geographic Information System rather than traditional cartographic methods.

== Data and Symbology ==
The spatial data used in the new maps is Vicmap Topographic data, which includes Vicmap Digital Framework Datasets along with other key government datasets. Vicmap data is the authoritative spatial data for the State of Victoria and is the foundation of Victoria's primary mapping and geographic information systems. The features depicted in Vicmap Topographic maps include both natural features, such as watercourses, contours, cliffs and tree cover, and constructed features, such as drains, gates, roads and shipwrecks. The traditional 1:25,000 printed topographic maps have been used as a benchmark for the new Vicmap Topographic products. Hence the new series replicates the features and associated symbology as depicted on the old maps.

== Products ==
The new series of Vicmap Topographic maps consists of 1:25000 and 1:50000 double format hardcopy maps, along with 1:30000 A4 and A3 online mapsheets. The new hardcopy maps are gradually replacing the old stock, with the entire state anticipated to be available at 1:50000 by December 2008. A4 and A3 size maps covering the entire state of Victoria are currently available to the public online. See link below.
