= List of places on the Victorian Heritage Register in the Shire of Loddon =

This is a list of places on the Victorian Heritage Register in the Shire of Loddon in Victoria, Australia. The Victorian Heritage Register is maintained by the Heritage Council of Victoria.

The Victorian Heritage Register, as of 2020, lists the following 13 state-registered places within the Shire of Loddon:

Place name	Place #	Location	Suburb or Town	Co-ordinates	Built	State registered	Photo
Blind Creek Ochre Mine and Processing Site	H1757	off Kingower-Arnold Rd	Kingower	36.618630°S 143.778630°E	c. 1900	26 November 1998	
Charlie Napier Hotel	H1143	29 Brooke St	Inglewood	36.573930°S 143.867710°E	1874	14 December 1995	
East Loddon Station Woolshed	H0480	206 Longs Rd	Serpentine	36.368870°S 143.961260°E	c. 1871	8 April 1981	
Fincham Pipe Organ	H1281	St Augustine's Church; 67 Sullivan St	Inglewood	36.573050°S 143.870040°E	1878	9 January 1997	
Glenalbyn Grange	H0779	84 Halls Rd	Kingower	36.582520°S 143.764990°E	1850s	27 June 1990	
Inglewood Court House	H1120	91 Southey St	Inglewood	36.572740°S 143.872500°E	1860	30 November 1995	
Janevale Bridge	H1986	Tarnagulla-Laanecoorie Rd over the Loddon River	Laanecoorie	36.825260°S 143.897740°E	1910-11	9 May 2002	
Jones Brothers Eucalyptus Distillery	H0276	1 Brooke St	Inglewood	36.568410°S 143.864890°E	c. 1900	8 March 2007	
Nine Mile Company Gold Mine	H1237	Nine Mile Rd	Nine Mile	36.435200°S 143.484610°E	1899	13 August 1998	
Pyramid railway station	H1696	Railway Ave	Pyramid Hill	36.052950°S 144.113200°E	1888	20 August 1982	
Tarnagulla Public Hall	H0778	69-71 Commercial Rd	Tarnagulla	36.770470°S 143.832650°E	1861-62	27 June 1990	
Tarnagulla Public Park Reserve and Cricket Pavilion	H0736	Wayman St	Tarnagulla	36.775240°S 143.828140°E	1882	5 July 1989	
Wild Duck Lead Gold Puddling Site	H1252	Freemantle Track	Waanyarra	36.841810°S 143.816380°E	1950s	19 December 1996	
