= Shire of East Loddon =

Coordinates: 36°24′S 143°58′E

- Local government area
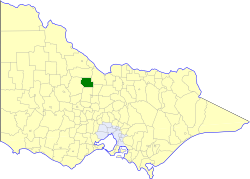
- Location in Victoria
- The Shire of East Loddon as at its dissolution in 1995
- Country: Australia
- State: Victoria
- Region: North Central Victoria
- Established: 1864
- Council seat: Serpentine

Area
  - Total: 1,200.18 km^{2} (463.39 sq mi)

Population
  - Total: 1,320 (1992)
  - Density: 1.100/km^{2} (2.849/sq mi)
- County: Bendigo
LGAs around Shire of East Loddon
Gordon	Gordon	Rochester
Korong	Shire of East Loddon	Rochester
Korong	Marong	Huntly

The Shire of East Loddon was a local government area about 50 kilometres (31 mi) northwest of Bendigo, in northwestern Victoria, Australia. The shire covered an area of 1,200.18 square kilometres (463.4 sq mi), and existed from 1864 until 1995.

== History ==
East Loddon was first incorporated as a road district on 28 December 1864, and became a shire on 28 July 1871.

On 20 January 1995, the Shire of East Loddon was abolished, and along with the Shires of Gordon and Korong, the Loddon River district of the former Rural City of Marong, and a number of surrounding districts, was merged into the newly created Shire of Loddon.

== Wards ==
The Shire of East Loddon was divided into three ridings on 14 May 1913, each of which elected three councillors:

- North Riding
- South Riding
- East Riding

== Towns and localities ==
- Bears Lagoon
- Calivil
- Dingee
- Jarklin
- Kamarooka
- Mitiamo
- Pompapiel
- Prairie
- Serpentine*
- Tandarra
- Yallook

* Council seat.

== Population ==
Year	Population
1954	1,446
1958	1,520*
1961	1,703
1966	1,722
1971	1,598
1976	1,542
1981	1,477
1986	1,341
1991	1,272

* Estimate in the 1958 Victorian Year Book.
