= Shire of Korong =

Coordinates: 36°25′S 143°37′E

- Local government area
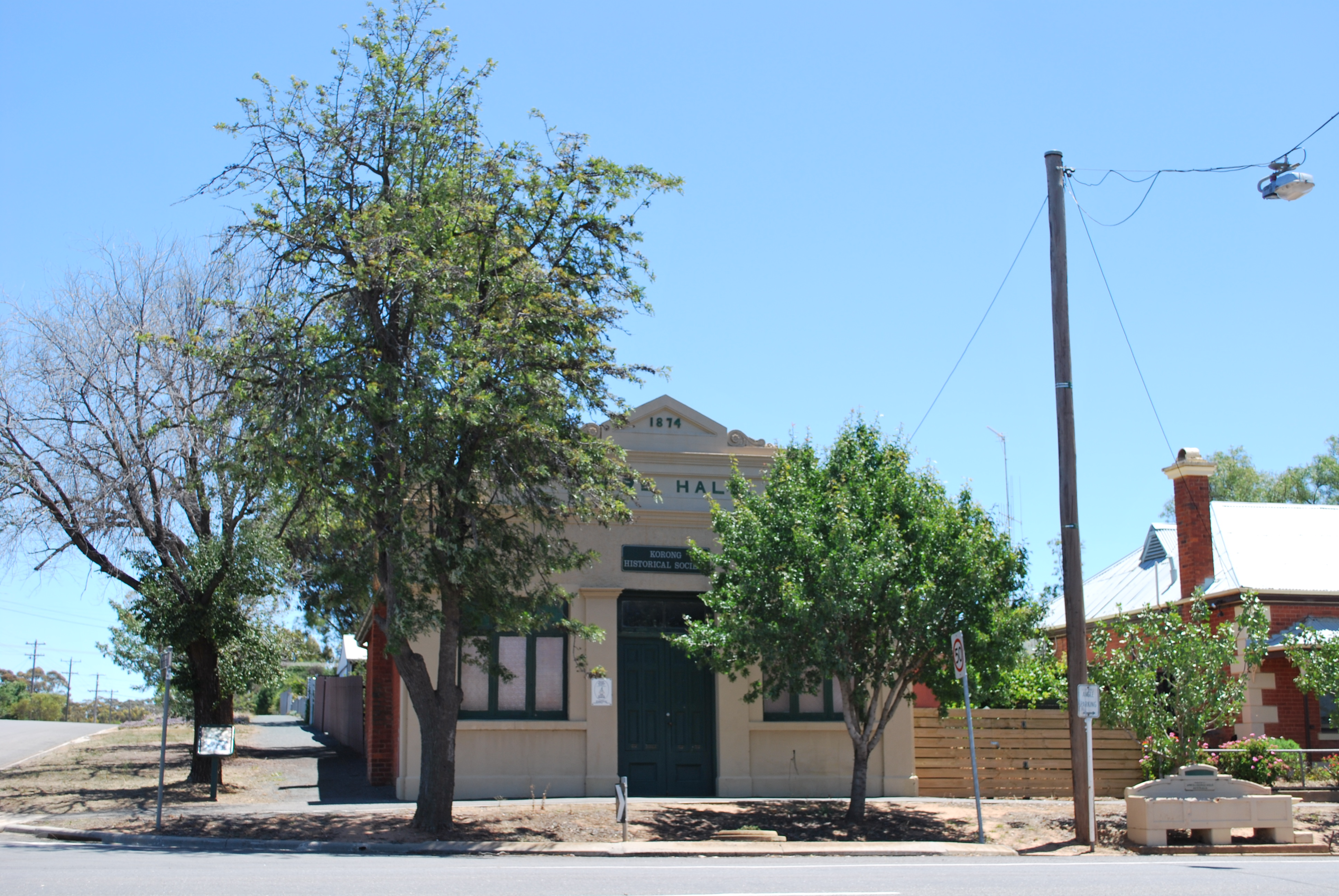
- The historic Shire of Korong Hall, at Wedderburn

- The Shire of Korong as at its dissolution in 1995
- Country: Australia
- State: Victoria
- Region: North Central Victoria
- Established: 1862
- Council seat: Wedderburn

Area
  - Total: 238.5 km^{2} (92.1 sq mi)

Population
  - Total(s): 3,480 (1992)
  - Density: 14.591/km^{2} (37.79/sq mi)
- County: Gladstone
LGAs around Shire of Korong
Charlton	Gordon	Gordon
Charlton	Shire of Korong	East Loddon
Kara Kara	Bet Bet	Marong

The Shire of Korong was a local government area about 75 kilometres (47 mi) west-northwest of Bendigo, in western Victoria, Australia. The shire covered an area of 238.5 square kilometres (92.1 sq mi), and existed from 1862 until 1995.

== History ==
Korong Shire was first incorporated as the Kingower and Wedderburne road district on 8 July 1862, and was renamed Korong at the time of its redesignation as a shire on 6 September 1864. On 1 February 1961, it annexed the Borough of Inglewood, which had been created a century earlier.

On 20 January 1995, the Shire of Korong was abolished, and along with the Shires of East Loddon and Gordon, the Loddon River district of the former Rural City of Marong, and surrounding districts, was merged into the newly created Shire of Loddon.

== Wards ==
The Shire of Korong was divided into three ridings, each of which elected three councillors:

- Central Riding
- North Riding
- South Riding

== Towns and localities ==
- Borung
- Fernihurst
- Glenalbyn
- Inglewood
- Kingower
- Korong Vale
- Rheola
- Wedderburn*
- Wychitella

* Council seat.

== Population ==
Year	Population
1954	3,943
1958	4,030*
1961	3,816
1966	3,662
1971	3,203
1976	3,098
1981	3,029
1986	3,347
1991	3,341

* Estimate in the 1958 Victorian Year Book.
