= Shire of Kerang =

- Local government area
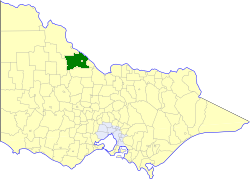
- Location in Victoria

- The Shire of Kerang as at its dissolution in 1995
- Country: Australia
- State: Victoria
- Region: Mallee
- Established: 1862
- Council seat: Kerang

Area
  - Total: 3,254.45 km^{2} (1,256.55 sq mi)

Population
  - Total: 4,380 (1992)
  - Density: 1.3458/km^{2} (3.486/sq mi)
- County: Gunbower, Tatchera
LGAs around Shire of Kerang
Swan Hill	Swan Hill	Wakool (NSW)
Wycheproof	Shire of Kerang	Cohuna
Charlton	Gordon	Gordon

The Shire of Kerang was a local government area located in northwestern Victoria, Australia, along the Murray River. The shire covered an area of 3,254.45 square kilometres (1,256.6 sq mi), and existed from 1862 until 1995. From 1966 onwards, Kerang itself was managed by a separate entity; the Borough of Kerang.

== History ==
The Swan Hill Road District, which initially covered most of northwestern Victoria, was incorporated on 8 July 1862, and became a shire on 14 August 1871. The Shire of Gordon was severed and incorporated on 26 May 1885, from parts of the East and West Loddon Ridings, with the Shire of Mildura following suit on 10 January 1890, from the Lower Murray Riding. The Shire of Castle Donnington was severed on 30 May 1893, from the remainder of those three ridings. The remainder of the shire was renamed the Shire of Kerang on 31 December 1898.

On 8 March 1922, parts of the North East and South East Ridings severed and was incorporated as the Shire of Cohuna, while the area around Kerang itself was incorporated as the Borough of Kerang on 1 April 1966. On 5 July 1977, the Shire of Gordon annexed parts of the South West Riding.

In 1994, as the State Government's local government reform program reached the area, it was clear that the Shire would be amalgamated with some of its neighbours. After months of discussions, the Shire and Borough agreed to support a merger with the Shires of Cohuna and Gordon into a so-called "Shire of Loddon Murray". They saw this as an opportunity to reduce duplication and create an LGA with an economically diverse base, including urban, commercial, industrial, dryland, irrigated, and horticultural land uses. The Local Government Board was broadly agreeable to this proposal, although it felt the Shire of Gordon had more in common with the areas to its south.

On 20 January 1995, the Shire of Kerang was abolished, and along with the Borough of Kerang and the Shire of Cohuna, was merged into the newly created Shire of Gannawarra. The Tresco township was transferred to the newly created Rural City of Swan Hill.

== Wards ==
The Shire of Kerang was divided into three ridings on 1 April 1990, each of which elected three councillors:

- Central Riding
- East Riding
- West Riding

== Towns and localities ==
- Appin
- Appin South
- Koondrook
- Lake Charm
- Lake Meran
- Lalbert
- Macorna
- Murrabit
- Quambatook
- Tittybong
- Towaninny
- Tragowel
- Tresco

== Population ==
Year	Population
1954	8,483
1958	9,020*
1961	9,095
1966	5,261
1971	4,930
1976	4,447
1981	4,366
1986	4,316
1991	4,222

* Estimate in the 1958 Victorian Year Book.
