= Borough of Kerang =

Coordinates: 35°43′S 143°55′E

- Local government area
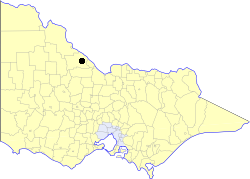
- Location in Victoria

- The Borough of Kerang as at its dissolution in 1995
- Country: Australia
- State: Victoria
- Region: Mallee
- Established: 1966
- Council seat: Kerang

Area
  - Total: 22.60 km^{2} (8.73 sq mi)

Population
  - Total: 4,300 (1992)
  - Density: 190.3/km^{2} (493/sq mi)
- County: Gunbower

The Borough of Kerang was a local government area in north-western Victoria, Australia. The borough, which for most of its history was part of the surrounding Shire of Kerang, covered an area of 22.60 square kilometres (8.7 sq mi), and existed from 1966 until 1995.

== History ==
Kerang was originally part of the Swan Hill Road District, which covered most of north-western Victoria, and was incorporated in 1862, becoming a shire on 14 August 1871. After several other areas severed from the shire, it was renamed the Shire of Kerang on 31 December 1898. The area around Kerang was incorporated as the Borough of Kerang on 1 April 1966.

On 20 January 1995, the Borough of Kerang was abolished, and along with the Shires of Cohuna and Kerang, was merged into the newly created Shire of Gannawarra.

=== Wards ===
The Borough of Kerang was not divided into wards, and its nine councillors represented all electors in the borough.

== Population ==
Year	Population
1966	4,165
1971	4,103
1976	4,022
1981	4,049
1986	4,031
1991	4,024

* Estimate in the 1958 Victorian Year Book.
