= Shire of Gordon =

Coordinates: 36°06′S 143°43′E

- Local government area
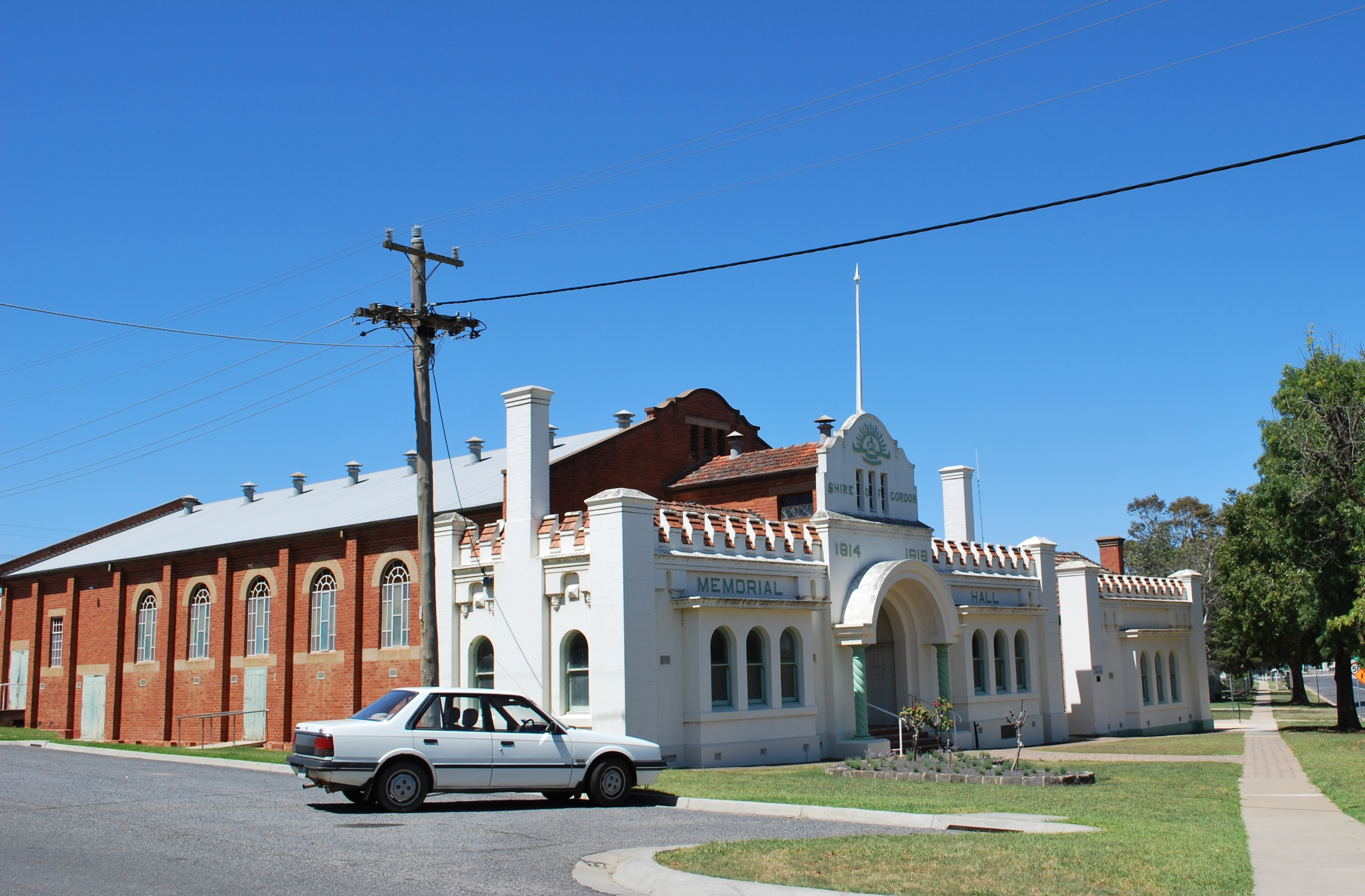
- Shire of Gordon memorial hall, Boort

- The Shire of Gordon as at its dissolution in 1995
- Country: Australia
- State: Victoria
- Region: North Central Victoria
- Established: 1885
- Council seat: Boort

Area
  - Total: 2,028 km^{2} (783 sq mi)

Population
  - Total: 2,720 (1992)
  - Density: 1.3412/km^{2} (3.474/sq mi)
- County: Gunbower, Gladstone, Tatchera
LGAs around Shire of Gordon
Kerang	Kerang	Cohuna
Charlton	Shire of Gordon	Rochester
Korong	East Loddon	Rochester

The Shire of Gordon was a local government area about 245 kilometres (152 mi) north-northwest of Melbourne, the state capital of Victoria, Australia. The shire covered an area of 2,028 square kilometres (783.0 sq mi), and existed from 1885 until 1995. The main towns were Boort and Pyramid Hill.

== History ==
The Swan Hill Road District, which initially covered most of north-western Victoria, was incorporated on 8 July 1862, and became a shire on 14 August 1871. The Shire of Gordon was severed and incorporated on 26 May 1885, from parts of the East and West Loddon Ridings, and was named after Major General Charles Gordon. Gordon annexed parts of the South West Riding of the Shire of Kerang on 5 October 1977.

In 1994, when the State Government's local government reform process reached the Wimmera and Loddon Mallee regions, Gordon was the only municipality that refused to nominate neighbouring shires with whom it was willing to amalgamate. It saw its "established economic base with excellent prospects for development" as grounds to stand alone. A community poll in October 1994 found only 11 people in favour of a merger with the Shire of Kerang to the north, while 1,300 people were opposed. Ultimately the review board recommended a merger of Gordon with the agricultural shires to its south.

On 20 January 1995, the Shire of Gordon was abolished, and along with the Shires of East Loddon and Korong, and parts of the former Rural City of Marong and surrounding districts, was merged into the newly created Shire of Loddon.

== Wards ==
The Shire of Gordon was divided into three ridings, each of which elected three councillors:

- Central Riding
- East Riding
- West Riding

== Towns and localities ==
- Appin South
- Bald Rock
- Barraport
- Boort*
- Canary Island
- Catumnal
- Durham Ox
- Gladfield
- Kow Swamp
- Lake Marmal
- Leaghur
- Loddon Vale
- Mincha
- Minmindie
- Mologa
- Pyramid Hill
- Sylvaterre
- Terrick Terrick
- Yando
- Yarrawalla

* Council seat.

== Population ==
Year	Population
1954	2,969
1958	3,070*
1961	3,227
1966	3,318
1971	3,124
1976	2,944
1981	2,873
1986	2,607
1991	2,585

* Estimate in the 1958 Victorian Year Book.
