= Battle of Hoyerswerda =

1759 battle

Coordinates: 51.5600°N 14.1500°E

- Part of the Third Silesian War (Seven Years' War)
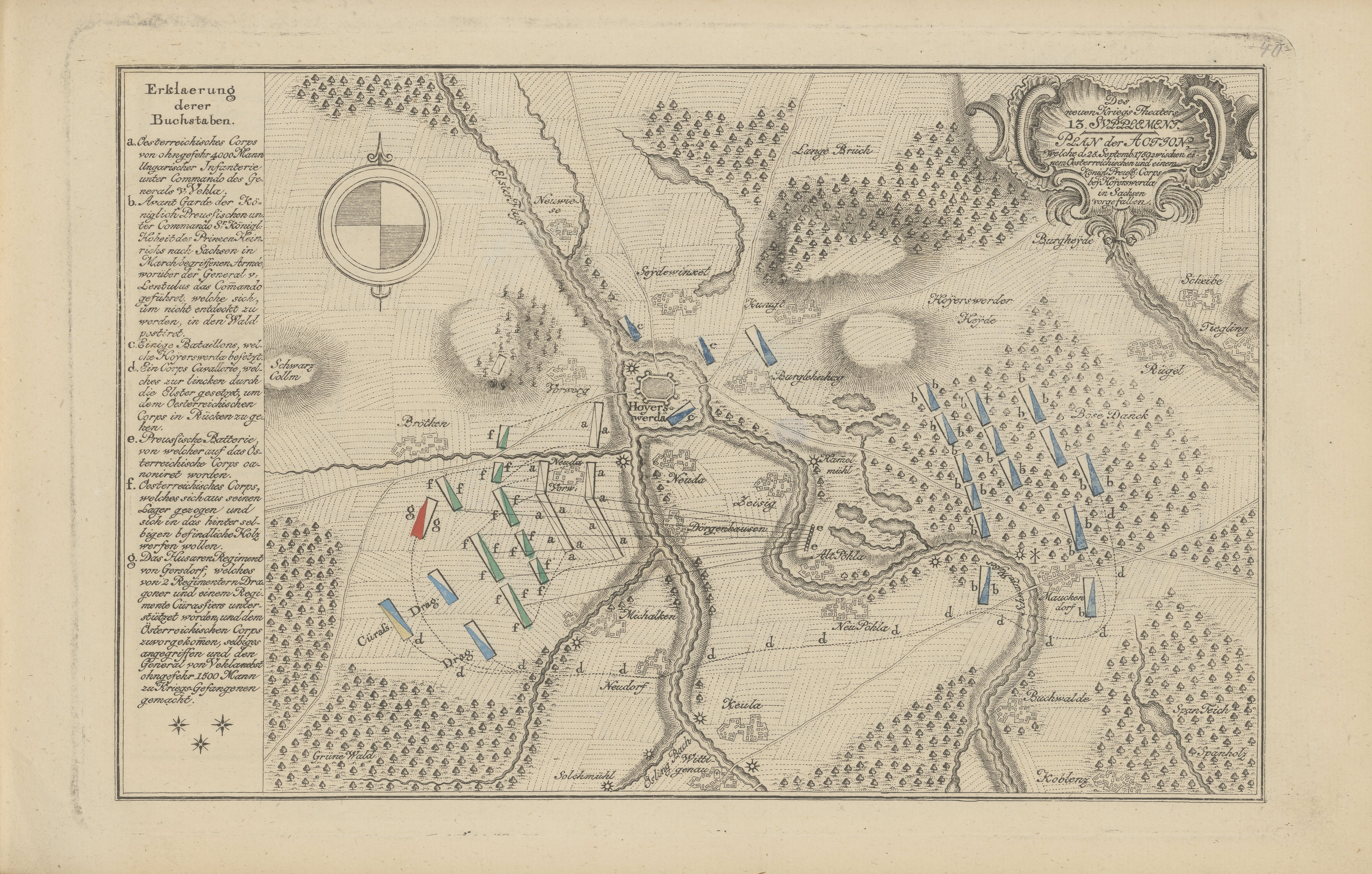
- German map of the battle (1763)
Date	25 September 1759
Location	Hoyerswerda, Saxony
Result	Prussian victory

Belligerents
(Kingdom of Prussia) Prussia	(Habsburg monarchy) Austria

Commanders and leaders
Prince Henry of Prussia	General Wehla

Strength
3,000	3,000

Casualties and losses
Minimal	600 dead 1,800 captured

The Battle of Hoyerswerda was a minor encounter of September 25, 1759 during the Third Silesian War (part of the Seven Years' War) between Prussian and Austrian forces. Following on from the calamitous Prussian defeat at Kunersdorf in August however, this small victory for Frederick the Great, taken together with the one fashioned at Korbitz four days earlier by Friedrich August von Finck, no doubt proved a timely tonic to his fragile confidence.

== Preliminaries ==
In September 1759 various armies under Prussia's Frederick the Great and Prince Henry, Austria's Count Leopold Joseph von Daun, and Russia's Pyotr Saltykov were shadowing each other across Silesia. Through successive, rapid crossings of the Oder Frederick succeeded in denying the cities of Glogau (now Głogów) and Breslau (now Wrocław) to the Russian forces but he failed to gain the decisive terrain advantage he sought before offering battle.

Meanwhile, Daun was looking to press home the great victory won at Kunersdorf when news reached him of the embarrassing defeat of the Austrian forces in Saxony, by a Prussian army but one third their size. Now more determined than ever to strike a decisive blow he marched his forces to Görlitz and climbed to high ground in order to observe the camp of Prince Henry of Prussia, his nearest, convenient opponent. Daun proclaimed his intention to storm this camp early the following morning, September 23.

== March of fifty hours ==
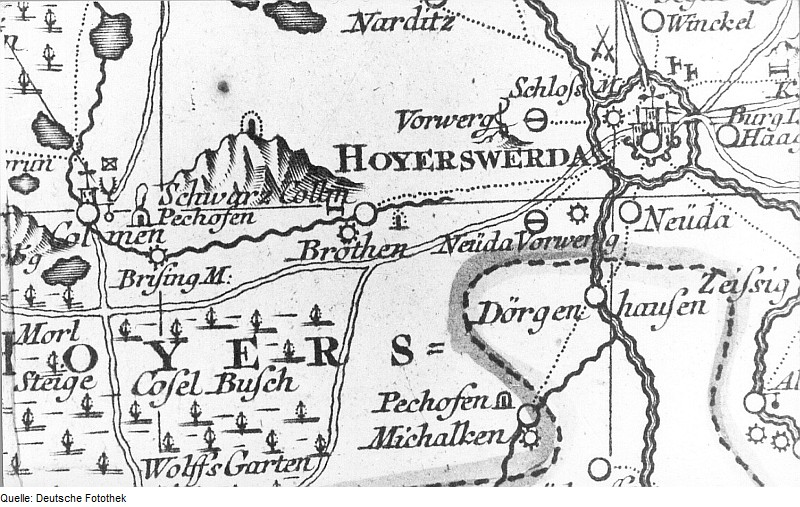
Contemporary map of Hoyerswerda. Battle site is marked.

Unfortunately for von Daun, at that moment Prince Henry was already making plans to leave the area. Throughout the evening of Saturday September 22 the Prussian forces quit their tents and marched away silently, leaving only watch fires and a token force to make plenty of noise. They made first for Rothenburg (Upper Lusatia) and rested there for three hours as twenty miles to the south, the Austrians sprang forward and overran their empty positions.

Von Daun's scouting horse reported that the Prussian baggage was now heading northeast towards Glogau. He suspected a trap and retired to Bautzen but in fact, when Prince Henry left Rothenburg it was to head due west, eighteen miles, to the Saxon village of Klitten. A further three hours rest was then followed by a forced march of twenty miles to the area of Hoyerswerda where lay an unsuspecting Imperial force of 3000 men under General Wehla.

General Wehla had distinguished himself at the Siege of Dresden. His subsequent deployment at Hoyerswerda was as part of a line designed to prevent the Prussian forces in Saxony and Silesia combining together. Recent events suggested that such an occurrence was unlikely however, since Frederick the Great was tied up in a minuet with the Russians whilst Prince Henry of Prussia now appeared on his way to join his brother in the east. Indeed, von Daun had written to Wehla just a few days previously, informing him that there was no danger on his eastern flank.

== Out of the woods ==
It must therefore, have been something of a shock when the Prussian vanguard under the Swiss General Lentulus, came streaming out of the woods. Wehla rallied his Croat regiment and formed his artillery but a well aimed Prussian cannonade swept through his Corps. Within a matter of minutes the Austrians were in full flight with their General captured and six hundred dead on the field. His hopes destroyed, von Daun was now forced to head west into Saxony himself, in order to shore up his forces there, leaving his Russian allies to face Frederick alone.

Thomas Carlyle in History Of Friedrich II Of Prussia (1858) called the Prussian night march probably Prince Henri's cleverest feat…By this last consummate little operation he has astonished Daun as much as anybody ever did; shorn his elaborate tissue of cunctations into ruin and collapse at one stroke; and in effect, as turns out, wrecked his campaign for this Year.
