= Fiery Flat =

- Town
- Coordinates: 36°24′32″S 143°49′22″E
- Country: Australia
- State: Victoria
- LGA: Shire of Loddon

Government
  - State electorate: Ripon
  - Federal division: Mallee

Population
  - Total: 28 (2021 census)
- Postcode: 3518

Fiery Flat is a locality in the Shire of Loddon, Victoria, Australia. At the 2021 census, Fiery Flat had a population of 28.

Fiery Flat Bushland Reserve is located in the locality.
