= Powlett Plains =

- Town
- Coordinates: 36°27′44″S 143°51′22″E
- Country: Australia
- State: Victoria
- LGA: Shire of Loddon

Government
  - State electorate: Ripon
  - Federal division: Mallee

Population
  - Total: 38 (2021 census)
- Postcode: 3517

Powlett Plains is a locality in the Shire of Loddon, Victoria, Australia. At the 2021 census, Powlett Plains had a population of 38.
