= Kurraca West =

- Town
- Coordinates: 36°30′25″S 143°33′20″E
- Country: Australia
- State: Victoria
- LGA: Shire of Loddon

Government
  - State electorate: Ripon
  - Federal division: Mallee

Population
  - Total: 0 (2021 census)
- Postcode: 3518

Kurraca West is a locality in the Shire of Loddon, Victoria, Australia. At the 2021 census, Kurraca West had "no people or a very low population".
