= Loddon Vale =

- Town
- Coordinates: 35°59′22″S 143°56′46″E
- Country: Australia
- State: Victoria
- LGA: Shire of Loddon

Government
  - State electorate: Murray Plains
  - Federal division: Mallee

Population
  - Total: 24 (2021 census)
- Postcode: 3575

Loddon Vale is a locality in the Shire of Loddon, Victoria, Australia. At the 2021 census, Loddon Vale had a population of 24.
