= Rheola =

Rheola may refer to:

- Rheola House, Resolven, Wales, United Kingdom
- Rheola, Wales, United Kingdom
- Rheola, Victoria, Australia
