= Woodstock On Loddon =

- Town
- Coordinates: 36°46′57″S 144°02′21″E
- Country: Australia
- State: Victoria
- LGA: Shire of Loddon

Government
  - State electorate: Ripon
  - Federal division: Mallee

Population
  - Total: 36 (2021 census)
- Postcode: 3551

Woodstock On Loddon is a locality in the Shire of Loddon, Victoria, Australia. At the 2021 census, Woodstock On Loddon had a population of 36.
