= Barraport =

- Town
- Coordinates: 36°0′4″S 143°40′17″E
- Country: Australia
- State: Victoria
- LGA: Shire of Loddon

Government
  - State electorate: Murray Plains
  - Federal division: Mallee

Population
  - Total: 45 (2021 census)
- Postcode: 3537

Barraport is a locality in Shire of Loddon, Victoria, Australia. At the 2021 census, Barraport had a population of 45.

== History ==
The traditional owners of the area are the Dja Dja Wurrung (Djaara) people.

Barraport was originally known as "Barrapoort", a name believed to derive from an Dja Dja Wurrung word meaning "bit," combined with the name of the nearby town of "Boort." The name was later altered to Barraport when the railway station was officially named. European settlement in the area began in the early 1870s. The land was heavily timbered with Mallee and Murray pine, much of which was cleared, although large shade trees were retained. By 1874, the locality had established a hotel and a Baptist church.

The construction of the railway line in 1886–87 led to the relocation of the town centre. The first school in the area opened in 1889 at Barraport North, also referred to as Gredgwin Village. Additional schools were later established in what became known as Barraport West, and a school in Barraport itself opened in 1915, operating until 1968. A cooperative grain shed was constructed at the railway station, which formed the centre of a township that also included a blacksmith, post office, and store. Local football and cricket teams were active in the community until the 1960s.
