= Bears Lagoon =

Bears Lagoon Victoria
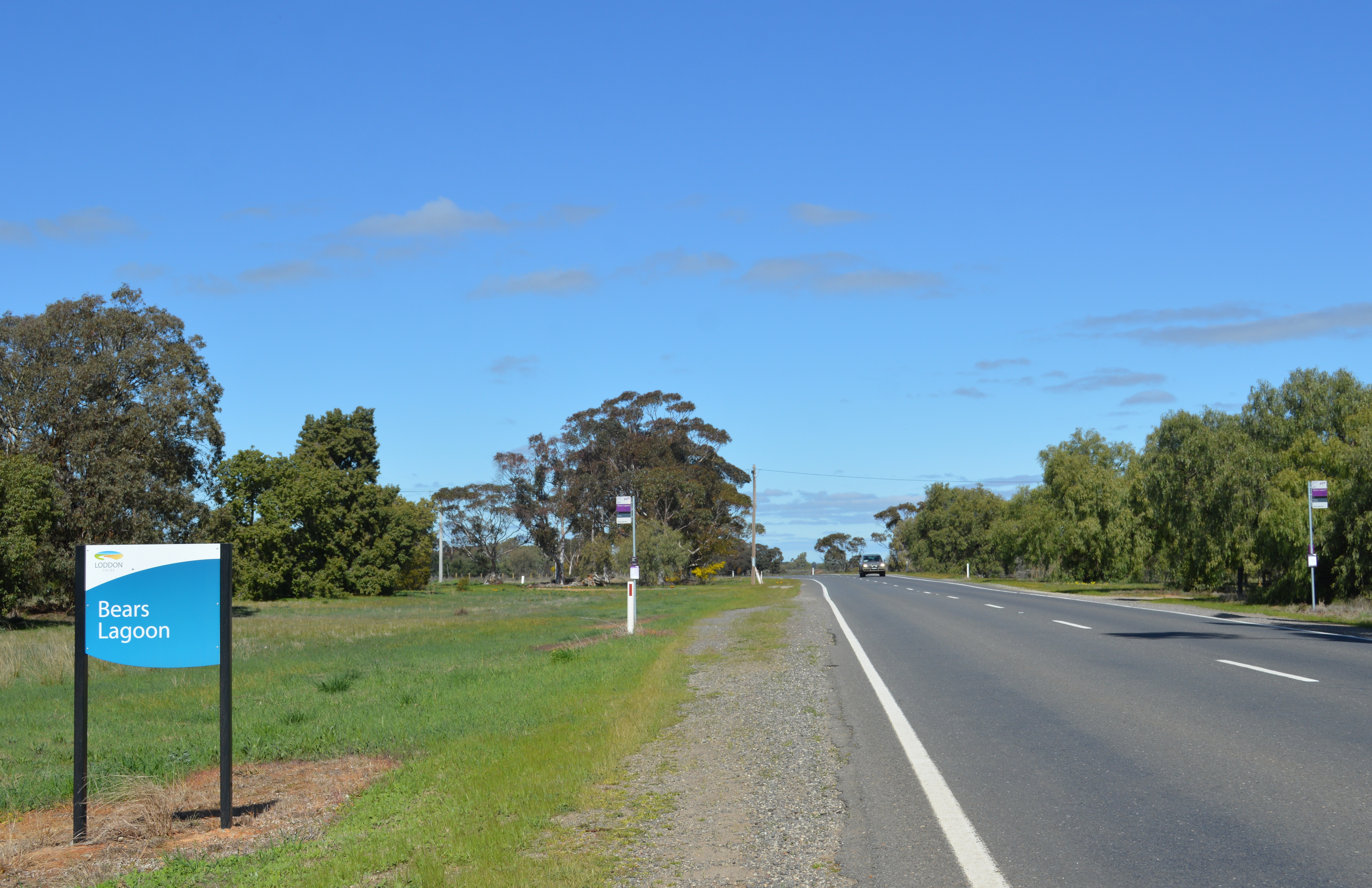
- Entering Bears Lagoon

- Coordinates: 36°19′50″S 143°58′28″E
- Population: 72 (2016 census)
- Postcode(s): 3517
- Location: 209 km (130 mi) NNW of Melbourne; 58 km (36 mi) NW of Bendigo; 8 km (5 mi) N of Serpentine
- LGA(s): Shire of Loddon
- State electorate(s): Bendigo East
- Federal division(s): Mallee

Bears Lagoon is a locality in north central Victoria, Australia. The locality is in the Shire of Loddon and on the Loddon Valley Highway, 209 kilometres (130 mi) north west of the state capital, Melbourne.

At the 2016 census, Bears Lagoon had a population of 72. The lagoon and the locality are named after the Victorian squatter John Bear.
