= Painswick, Victoria =

Painswick
- Town
- Coordinates: 36°48′22″S 143°44′58″E
- Country: Australia
- State: Victoria
- LGA: Shire of Loddon

Government
  - State electorate: Ripon
  - Federal division: Mallee

Population
  - Total: 14 (2021 census)
- Postcode: 3551

Painswick is a locality in the Shire of Loddon, Victoria, Australia. At the 2021 census, Painswick had a population of 14.

== History ==
Painswick is named after the town of the same name in Gloucestershire, England.
