= Yarraberb =

- Town
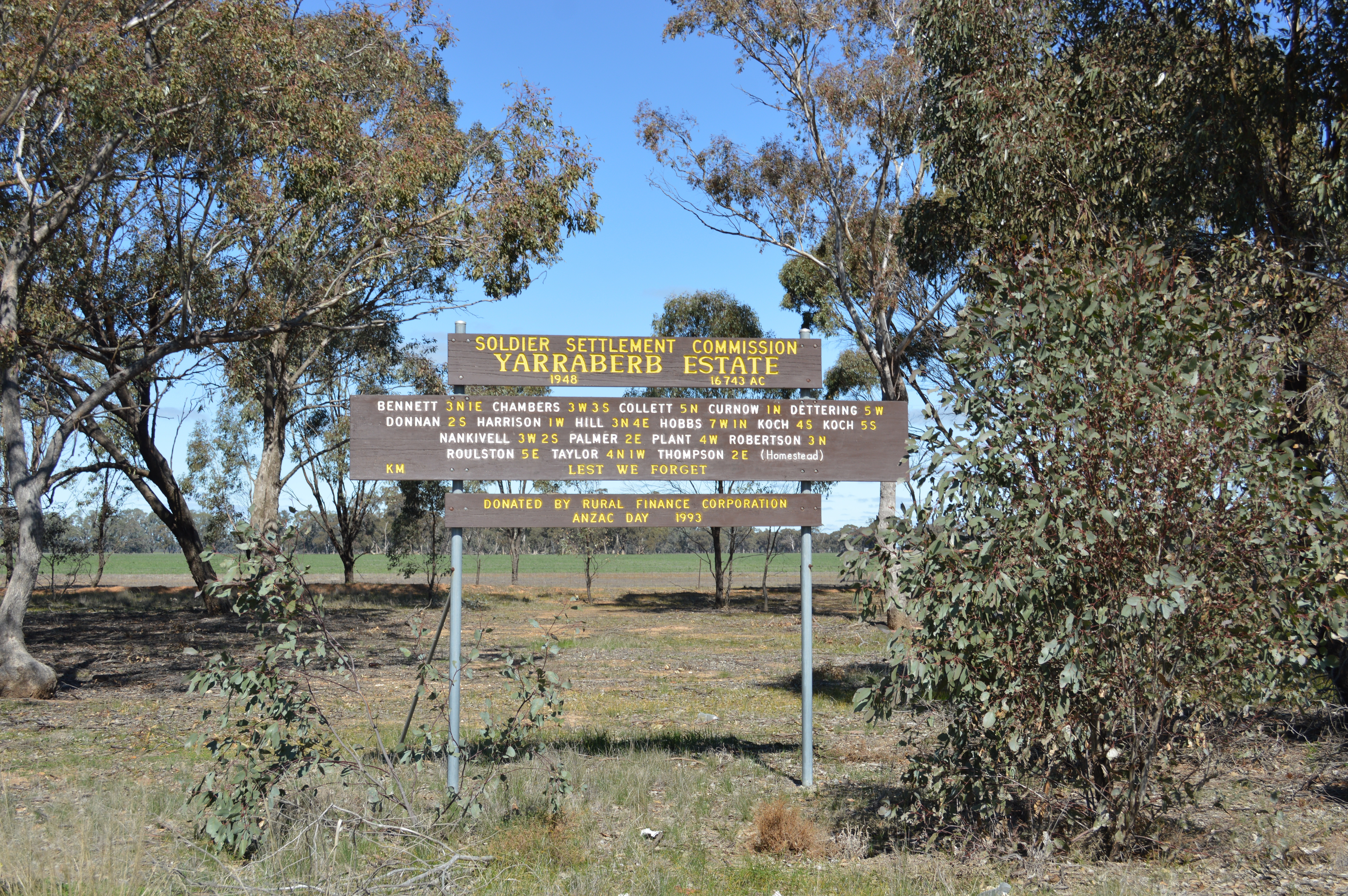
- A sign marking Yarraberb as a soldier settlement location

- Coordinates: 36°32′44″S 144°8′25″E
- Country: Australia
- State: Victoria
- LGA: Shire of Loddon
- Location: 178 km (111 mi) NW of Melbourne; 32 km (20 mi) NW of Bendigo; 9 km (5.6 mi) E of Bridgewater On Loddon

Government
  - State electorate: Ripon
  - Federal division: Mallee

Population
  - Total: 23 (2016 census)
- Postcode: 3516

Yarraberb is a locality in north central Victoria, Australia. The locality is in the Shire of Loddon, 209 kilometres (130 mi) north west of the state capital, Melbourne.

At the 2016 census, Yarraberb had a population of 23.
