= County of Gunbower =

Coordinates: 35°59′S 144°10′E

Gunbower
- Cadastral division
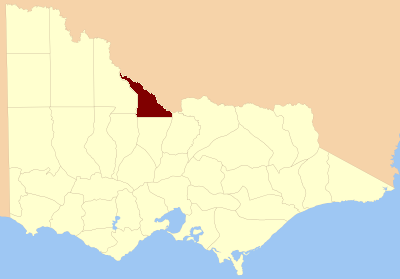
- Location in Victoria
- Country: Australia
- State: Victoria
- Established: 24 February 1871

Area
  - Total: 3,491 km^{2} (1,348 sq mi)
Lands administrative divisions around Gunbower
Tatchera	Wakool (NSW)	Wakool (NSW)
Tatchera	Gunbower	Cadell (NSW)
Gladstone	Bendigo	Rodney

The County of Gunbower is one of the 37 counties of Victoria which are part of the cadastral divisions of Australia, used for land titles. It is located to the south of the Murray River, from Swan Hill to Echuca.

The County of Gunbower was proclaimed in 1871, with others from the Loddon Land District. The name is an aboriginal word.

== Parishes ==
Parishes include:

- Cohuna, Victoria
- Gannawarra, Victoria
- Gunbower, Victoria
- Gunbower West, Victoria
- Kerang, Victoria
- Loddon, Victoria
- Macorna, Victoria
- Millewa, Victoria
- Mincha, Victoria
- Mincha West, Victoria
- Mologa, Victoria
- Murrabit, Victoria
- Murrabit West, Victoria
- Patho, Victoria
- Terrick Terrick East, Victoria
- Terrick Terrick West, Victoria
- Tragowel, Victoria
- Torrumbarry, Victoria
- Torrumbarry North, Victoria
- Wharparilla, Victoria
- Yarrowalla, Victoria
