= Campbells Forest =

- Town
- Coordinates: 36°36′47″S 144°7′0.3″E
- Country: Australia
- State: Victoria
- LGA: Shire of Loddon

Government
  - State electorates: Bendigo East; Ripon
  - Federal division: Mallee

Population
  - Total: 50 (2021 census)
- Postcode: 3556

Campbells Forest is a locality in the Shire of Loddon, Victoria, Australia. At the 2021 census, Campbells Forest had a population of 50.
