= Murphys Creek, Victoria =

Murphys Creek
- Town
- Coordinates: 36°45′10″S 143°46′15″E
- Country: Australia
- State: Victoria
- LGA: Shire of Loddon

Government
  - State electorate: Ripon
  - Federal division: Mallee

Population
  - Total: 46 (2021 census)
- Postcode: 3551

Murphys Creek is a locality in the Shire of Loddon, Victoria, Australia. At the 2021 census, Murphys Creek had a population of 46.

== History ==
Murphy's Creek State School opened in on 22 April 1872 and closed on 5 April 1962.

From 1969 to 1970, the Geological Survey of Victoria conducted an underground water investigation in Murphy's Creek, then part of the Shire of Bet Bet, in response to a local request for a community bore. The study, building on earlier work from 1960, found that shallow alluvial sediments offered limited freshwater, while deeper bedrock contained saline water, leading to the recommendation that drilling be focused near Bullabul Creek and Arnolda Bridge.
