= Fentons Creek =

Fentons Creek Victoria
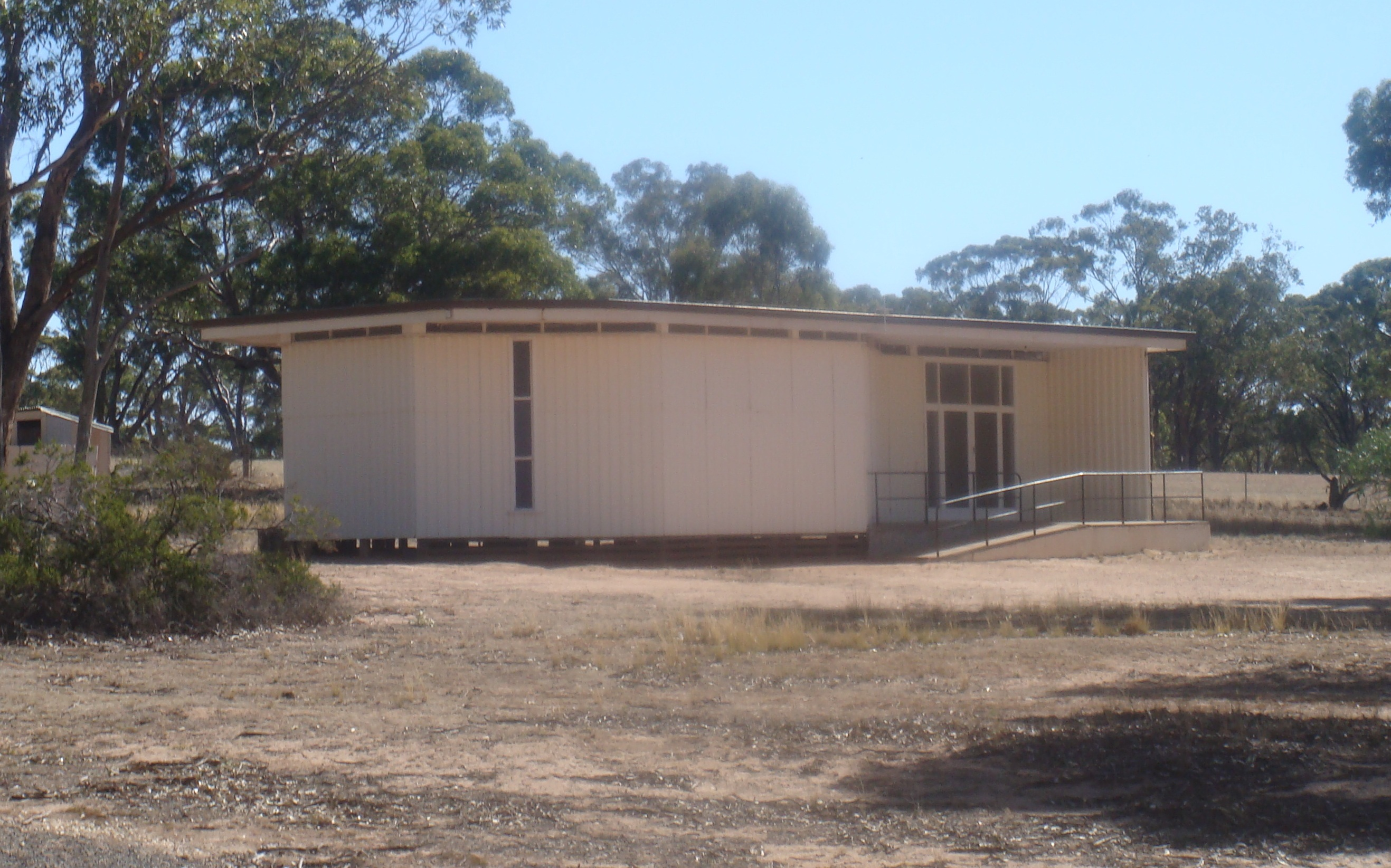
- The church at Fentons Creek

- Coordinates: 36°33′33″S 143°32′21″E
- Population: 27 (2021 census)
- Postcode(s): 3518
- Elevation: 250 m (820 ft)
- Location: 235 km (146 mi) NW of Melbourne; 90 km (56 mi) W of Bendigo; 19 km (12 mi) S of Wedderburn
- LGA(s): Shire of Loddon
- State electorate(s): Ripon
- Federal division(s): Mallee

Fentons Creek is a locality in the Shire of Loddon, Victoria, Australia . A creek with the same name runs along the edge of the locality. At the 2021 census, Fentons Creek had a population of 27.

In Fentons Creek there is a Country Fire Authority station, a chapel and an old schoolhouse that is no longer used.

== Gallery ==
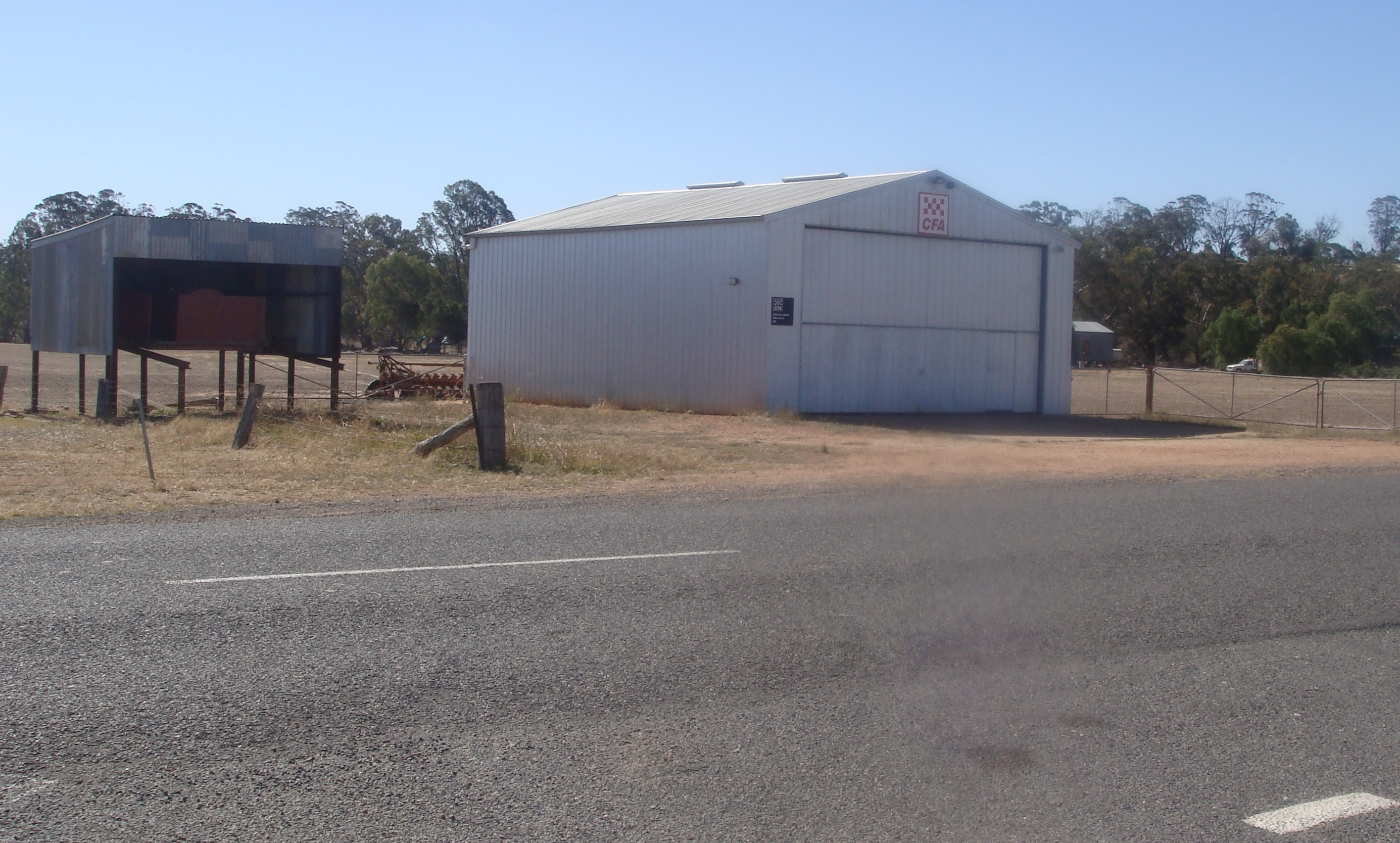
The CFA shed

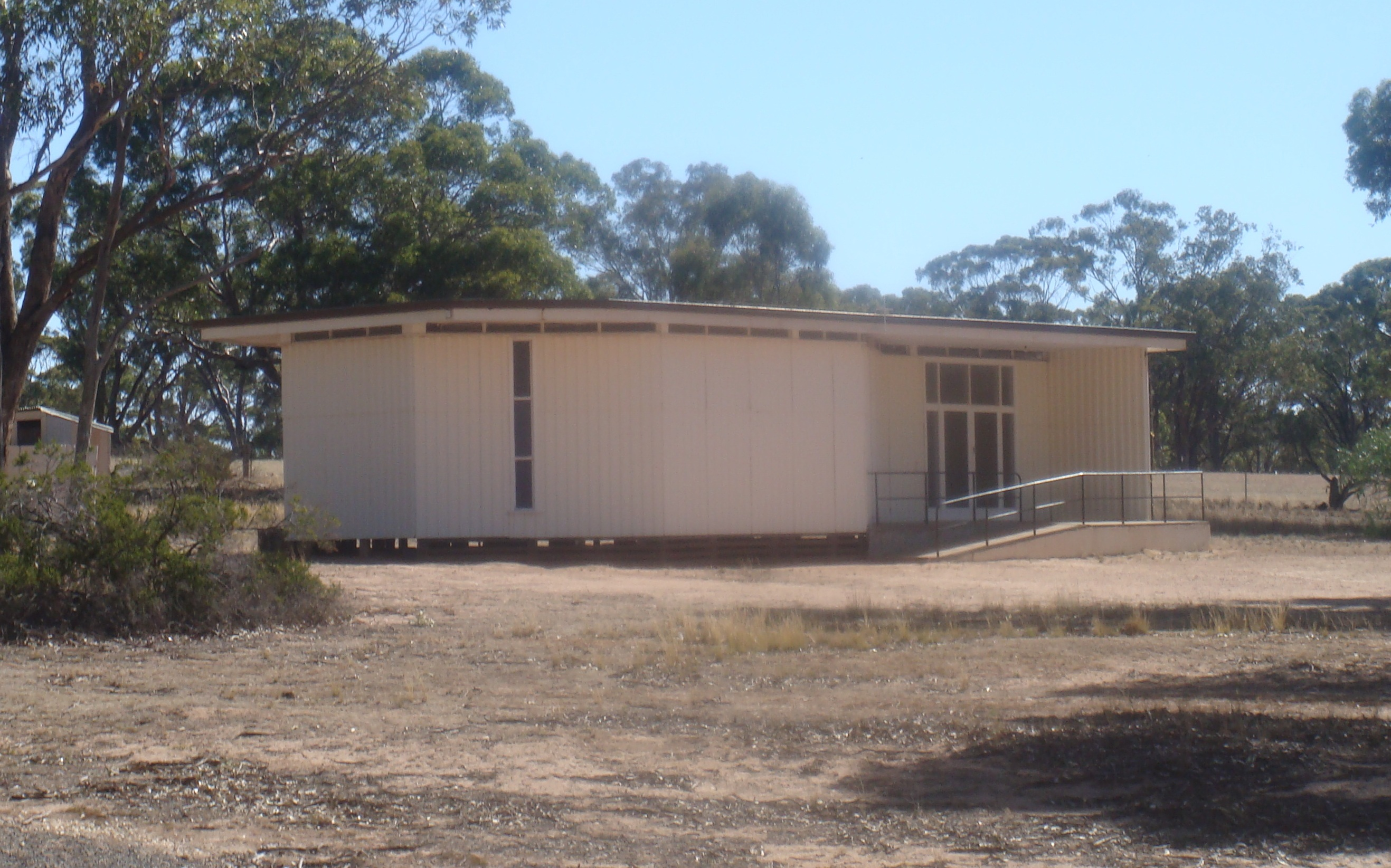
The chapel

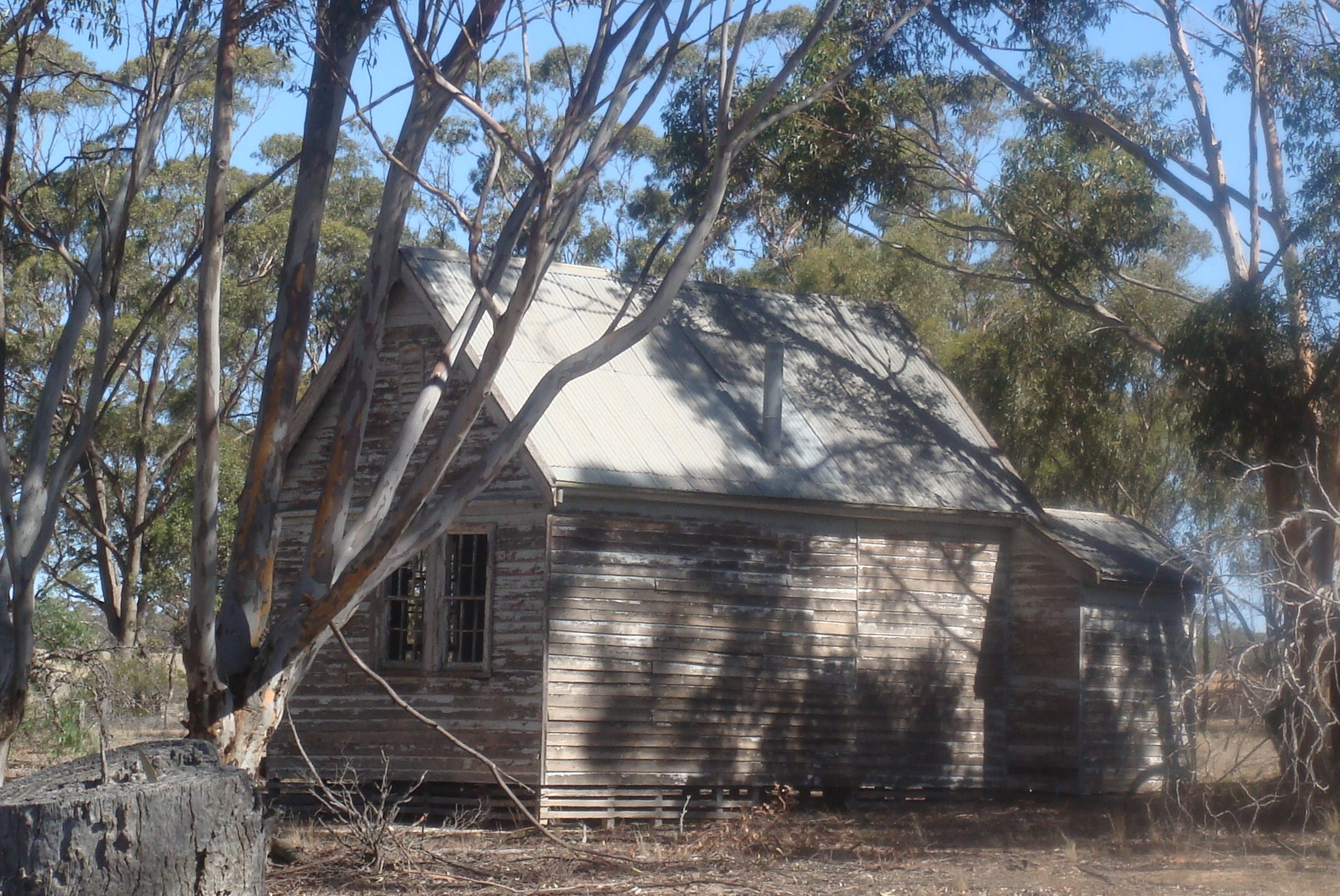
The old schoolhouse

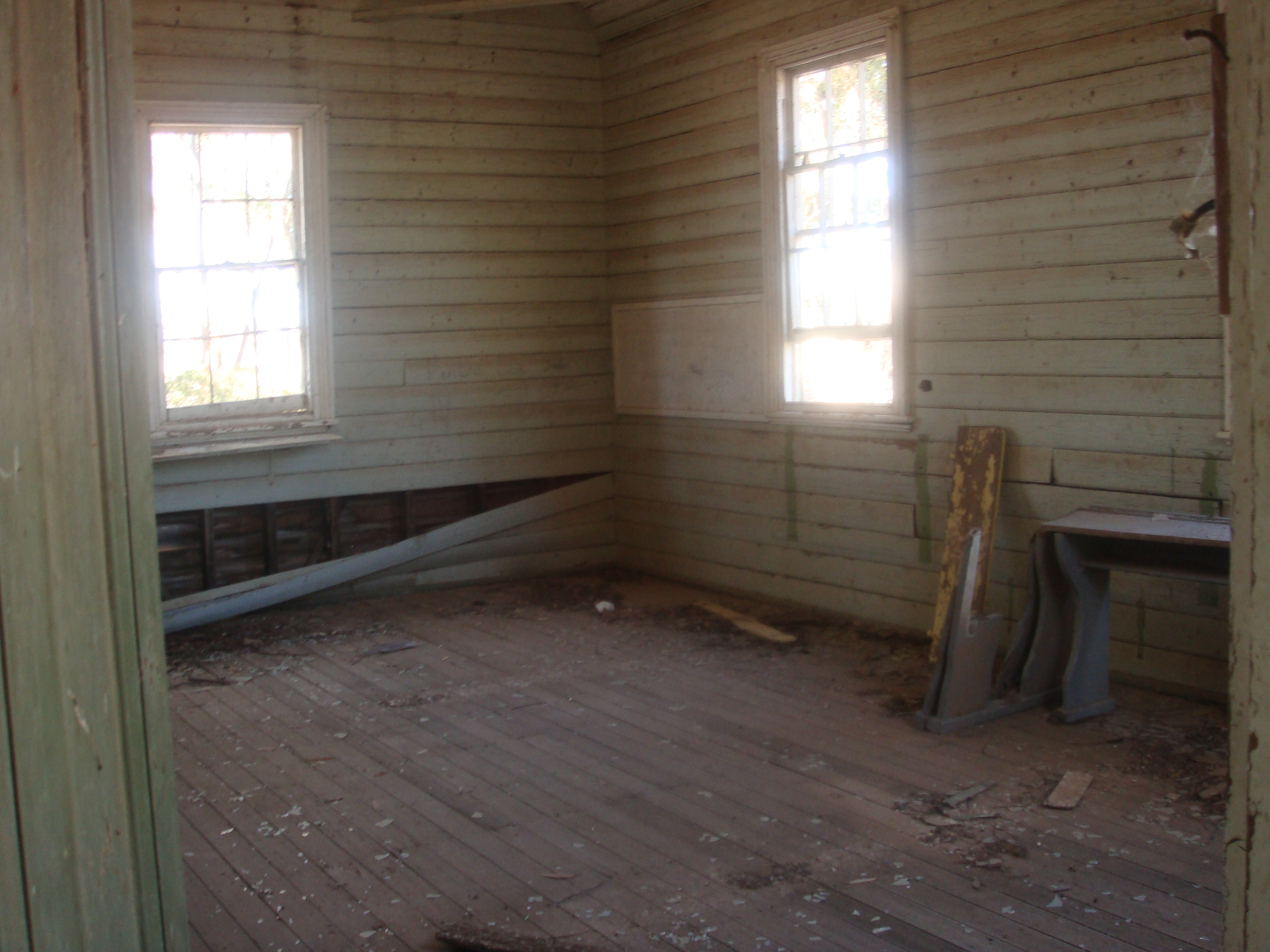
Inside the schoolhouse
