= Laanecoorie =

- Town
- Coordinates: 36°49′S 143°55′E
- Country: Australia
- State: Victoria
- LGA: Shire of Loddon
- Location: 104 km (65 mi) NW of Melbourne; 20 km (12 mi) NE of; 15 km (9.3 mi) S of

Government
  - State electorate: Ripon
  - Federal division: Mallee

Population
  - Total: 179 (2021 census)
- Postcode: 3463
Localities around Laanecoorie
Waanyarra	Tarnagulla	Woodstock West
Dunolly	Laanecoorie	Shelbourne
Betly	Eddington	Eastville

Laanecoorie is a locality in the Shire of Loddon, Victoria, Australia. Laanecoorie is situated on the Loddon River. It has a community hall, church, and caravan park. Before the town was established the land was part of a station known as Languycoorie, but the name had various spellings including Lannie-e-coora and others which were used in the newspapers and Government Gazettes of the 1850s when referring to the station. At the 2021 census, Laanecoorie had a population of 179.

== History ==
Laanecoorie is situated on land once part of the huge Simson station Charlotte Plains which was taken up in 1840 by Donald Campbell Simson (1809–1851), a Scot from Islay in Scotland's Inner Hebrides. The town is named after one of three subdivisions of the station which were created in 1851 after Simson's death. In June 1840, Simson entered a partnership with William Hampden Dutton, an agricultural scientist and pastoralist and James Monckton Darlot, an overlander and explorer. Together they were responsible for the beginnings of Charlotte Plains. By the year's end the partnership failed because of Dutton's bankruptcy, and Simson then had the station alone. He was at various times assisted in running it by his two brothers, John (1798/9-1848) and Hector Norman (1819–1880), who did not, as has for many years been claimed in many newspaper articles, book and pamphlets written on the subject, participate in founding the station. In mid-1840 both were employed in Sydney.

The original partners took Fourteen Mile Creek station and at the same time Simson alone took over Cairn Curran from Dutton's associate, the Melbourne businessman Frederick Manton. He then also leased 180,405 acres at Cairn Curran's west. In this complex process of acceding and ceding stations it was the land last referred to which would become Charlotte Plains, but it remained unnamed until 1845. In June 1841, the leases of Cairn Curran and Charlotte Plains were officially sold to Simson's brother Hector Simson, usually known as Norman, and although it was held de facto by him Donald Simson was still running the two stations. The lease of Cairn Curran was taken over by Frederick Langdon and George Ward Cole in November 1841, and some time after it was unofficially occupied by Edmund Bryant when he relocated to Port Phillip from Van Diemen's Land with his family. Norman Simson married Bryant's daughter, Jane, in 1850 after ha had taken up his own station, Sutton Grange, north of Mount Alexander, in 1849. On Donald's death Norman took over the management of Charlotte Plains and it was divided in three. Two sections took the names Languycoorie and Janevale, and the third retained the original name, Charlotte Plains. With an excellent stock capacity and profitable wool production, Charlotte Plains was one of the Port Phillip colony's most important sheep station in the 1840s, but it went into decline after Simson's death in 1851 and in the 1860s and 1870s his two surviving sons exploited it until they had sold off its last lands by 1884.

Gold was discovered around Laanecoorie at Jones Creek in 1853 and later on at Poseidon in 1906. The first farms were selected by the Lyon brothers, the Stone brothers and William Anderson in 1857. They and several other selectors were the township's foundational fathers and were responsible for establishing churches and the first school. The latter undertaking would never have been completed as it was without the informed leadership and persistently lobbying of the education authorities by Thomas Langdon (1832–1914). Langdon was politically active in various rural areas of Victorian and was always involved in local community affairs, in particular matters of education and agriculture. He was the President of Marong Shire 1877–9, and as a member of the Legislative Assembly represented Avoca from 1880 to 1889 and Korong from 1892 to 1914.

The first bridge over the Loddon River was built in 1870, but was destroyed in the big flood of 1909 when the Laanecoorie Weir was breached. The weir had been constructed in 1891 and was the second irrigation scheme for Victoria. The well-known engineer and World War I general, Sir John Monash, designed and built a new bridge of reinforced concrete beam and slab construction and it still stands today.
