= Jarklin =

Jarklin Victoria
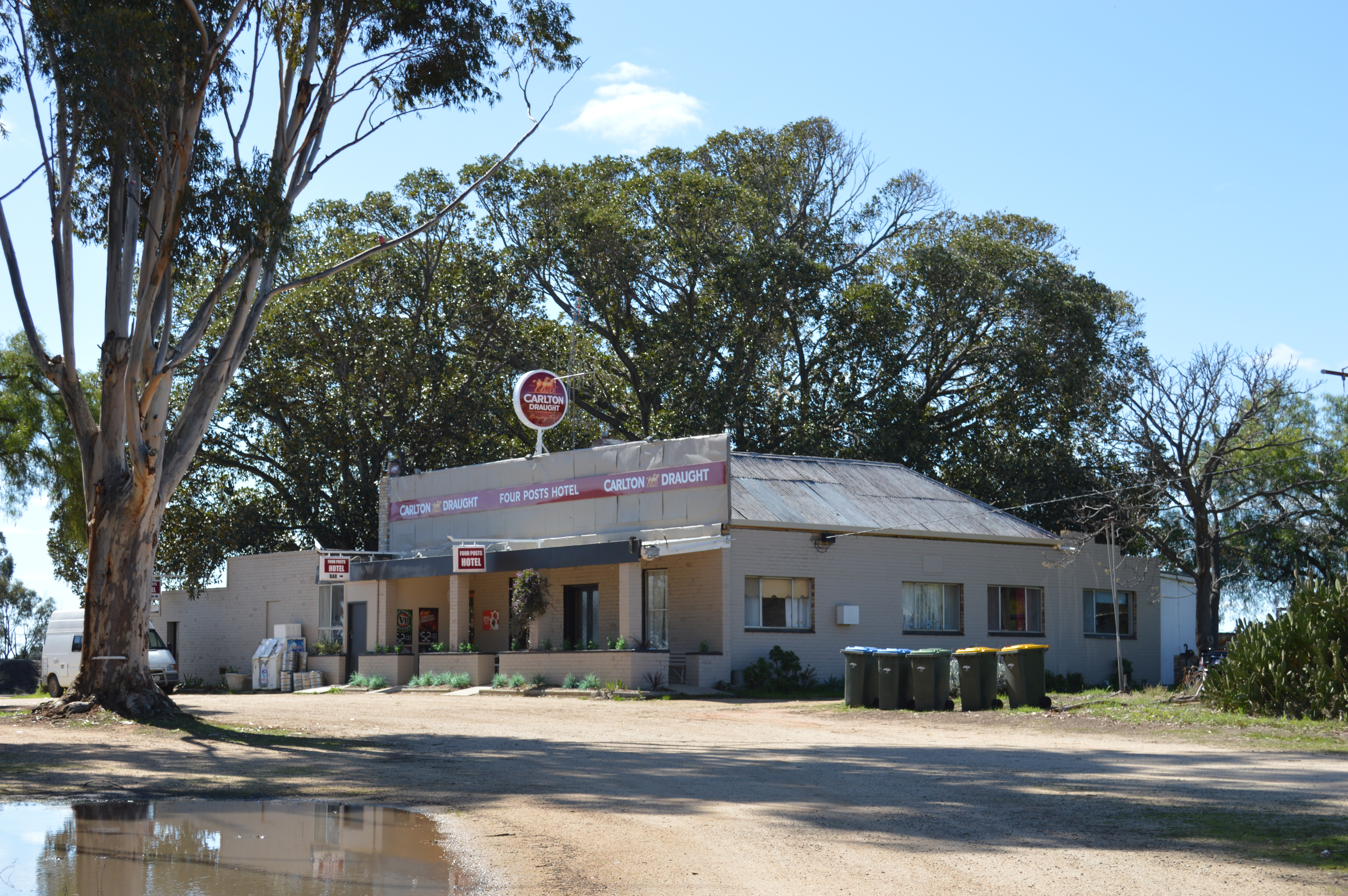
- Four Posts Hotel at Jarklin

- Coordinates: 36°16′S 143°58′E
- Population: 37 (2016 census)
- Postcode(s): 3517
- Location: 222 km (138 mi) NNW of Melbourne; 71 km (44 mi) NNW of Bendigo; 21 km (13 mi) N of Serpentine
- LGA(s): Shire of Loddon
- State electorate(s): Murray Plains
- Federal division(s): Mallee

Jarklin is a locality in the Shire of Loddon, Victoria, Australia, 222 kilometres (138 mi) north north west of the state capital, Melbourne. At the 2016 census, Jarklin had a population of 37.
