= Gladfield, Victoria =

Gladfield
- Town
- Coordinates: 36°04′15″S 143°56′38″E
- Country: Australia
- State: Victoria
- LGA: Shire of Loddon

Government
  - State electorate: Murray Plains
  - Federal division: Mallee

Population
  - Total: 32 (2021 census)
- Postcode: 3575

Gladfield is a locality in the Shire of Loddon, Victoria, Australia. At the 2021 census, Gladfield had a population of 32.
