= Derby, Victoria =

Derby
- Town
- Coordinates: 36°38′48″S 144°00′50″E
- Country: Australia
- State: Victoria
- LGA: Shire of Loddon

Government
  - State electorate: Ripon
  - Federal division: Mallee

Population
  - Total: 18 (2021 census)
- Postcode: 3475

Derby is a locality in the Shire of Loddon, Victoria, Australia. At the 2021 census, Derby had a population of 18.
