= McIntyre, Victoria =

McIntyre
- Town
- Coordinates: 36°41′43″S 143°41′03″E
- Country: Australia
- State: Victoria
- LGA: Shire of Loddon

Government
  - State electorate: Ripon
  - Federal division: Mallee

Population
  - Total: 47 (2021 census)
- Postcode: 3472

McIntyre is a locality in the Shire of Loddon, Victoria, Australia. At the 2021 census, McIntyre had a population of 47.
