= Cochranes Creek =

- Town
- Coordinates: 36°41′57″S 143°34′56″E
- Country: Australia
- State: Victoria
- LGA: Shire of Loddon

Government
  - State electorate: Ripon
  - Federal division: Mallee

Population
  - Total: 9 (2021 census)
- Postcode: 3475

Cochranes Creek is a locality in the Shire of Loddon, Victoria, Australia. At the 2021 census, Cochranes Creek had a population of 9.
