= Berrimal =

- Town
- Coordinates: 36°30′3″S 143°27′51″E
- Country: Australia
- State: Victoria
- LGA: Shire of Loddon

Government
  - State electorate: Ripon
  - Federal division: Mallee

Population
  - Total: 52 (2021 census)
- Postcode: 3518

Berrimal is a locality in Shire of Loddon, Victoria, Australia. At the 2021 census, Berrimal had a population of 52.
