= Glenalbyn, Victoria =

Glenalbyn
- Town
- Coordinates: 36°29′23″S 143°43′11″E
- Country: Australia
- State: Victoria
- LGA: Shire of Loddon

Government
  - State electorate: Ripon
  - Federal division: Mallee

Population
  - Total: 21 (2021 census)
- Postcode: 3517

Glenalbyn is a locality in the Shire of Loddon, Victoria, Australia. At the 2021 census, Glenalbyn had a population of 21.
