= Bridgewater North =

- Town
- Coordinates: 36°33′10″S 144°0′2″E
- Country: Australia
- State: Victoria
- LGA: Shire of Loddon

Government
  - State electorate: Ripon
  - Federal division: Mallee

Population
  - Total: 54 (2021 census)
- Postcode: 3516

Bridgewater North is a locality in the Shire of Loddon, Victoria, Australia. At the 2021 census, Bridgewater North had a population of 54.
