= Mysia, Victoria =

Mysia
- Town
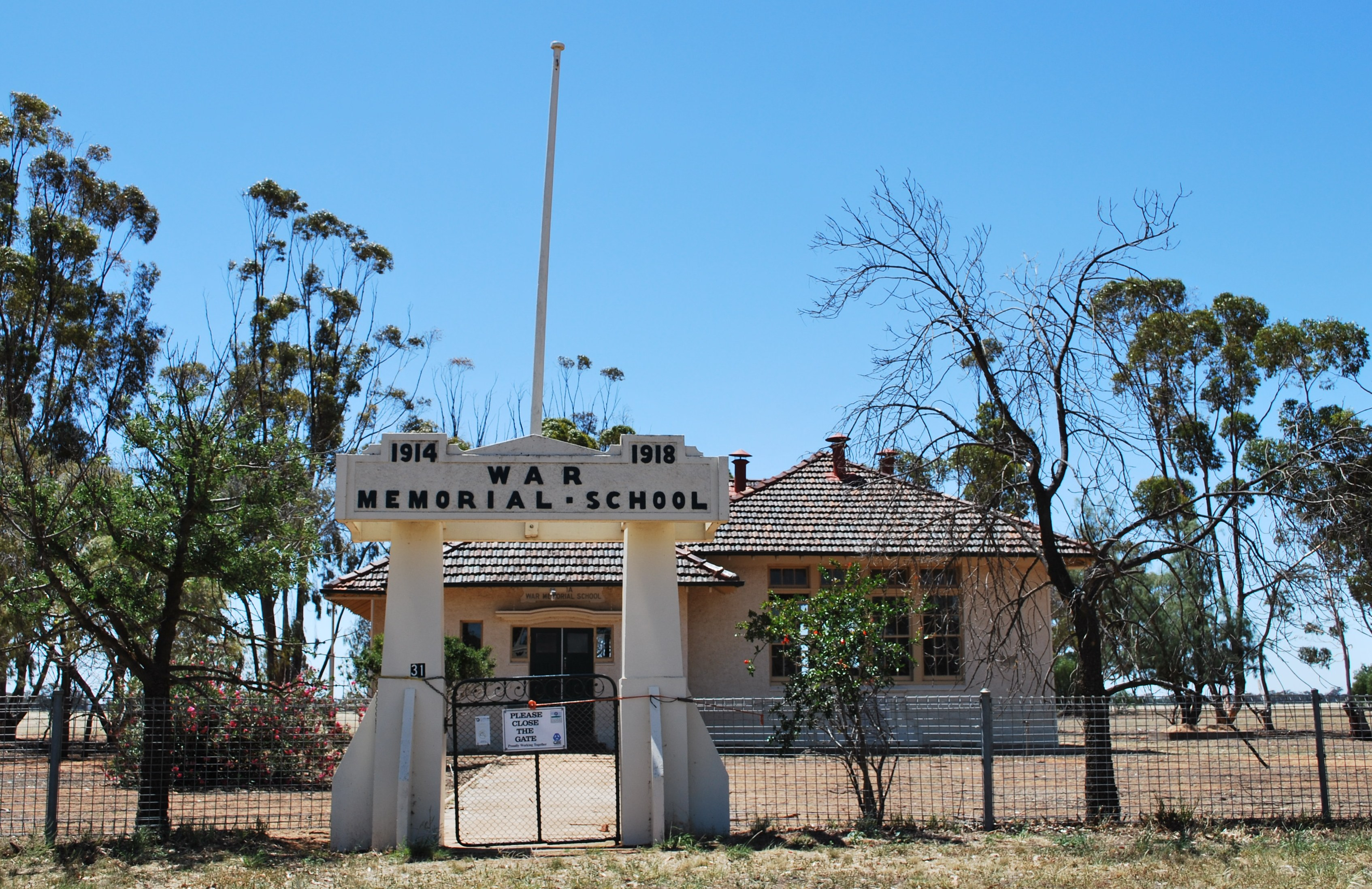
- War Memorial School

- Coordinates: 36°13′48″S 143°45′14″E
- Country: Australia
- State: Victoria
- LGA: Shire of Loddon
- Location: 243 km (151 mi) N of Melbourne; 89 km (55 mi) NW of Bendigo; 29 km (18 mi) NE of Wedderburn; 18 km (11 mi) S of Boort

Government
  - State electorate: Murray Plains
  - Federal division: Mallee

Population
  - Total: 26 (2021 census)
- Postcode: 3518

Mysia is a locality in the Shire of Loddon, Victoria, Australia, located 243 kilometres (151 mi) north of the state capital, Melbourne. At the 2021 census, Mysia had a population of 26.

== History ==
Mysia Post Office opened on 6 June 1877,and Mysia Railway Station office opened in 1883. Mysia closed in 1895 but reopened in 1911, replacing Mysia Railway Station office, before finally closing in 1992.

The War Memorial School was opened on 9 November 1921 by the Earl of Stradbroke, Governor of Victoria. The school was funded by public subscription which raised 500 pounds. The building was restored in 1999 and is currently used as a community hall.
