= Arnold West =

- Town
- Coordinates: 36°40′8″S 143°46′37″E
- Country: Australia
- State: Victoria
- LGA: Shire of Loddon

Government
  - State electorate: Ripon
  - Federal division: Mallee

Population
  - Total: 19 (2021 census)
- Postcode: 3551

Arnold West is a locality in Shire of Loddon, Victoria, Australia. At the 2021 census, Arnold West had a population of 19.
