= Logan, Victoria =

Logan
- Town
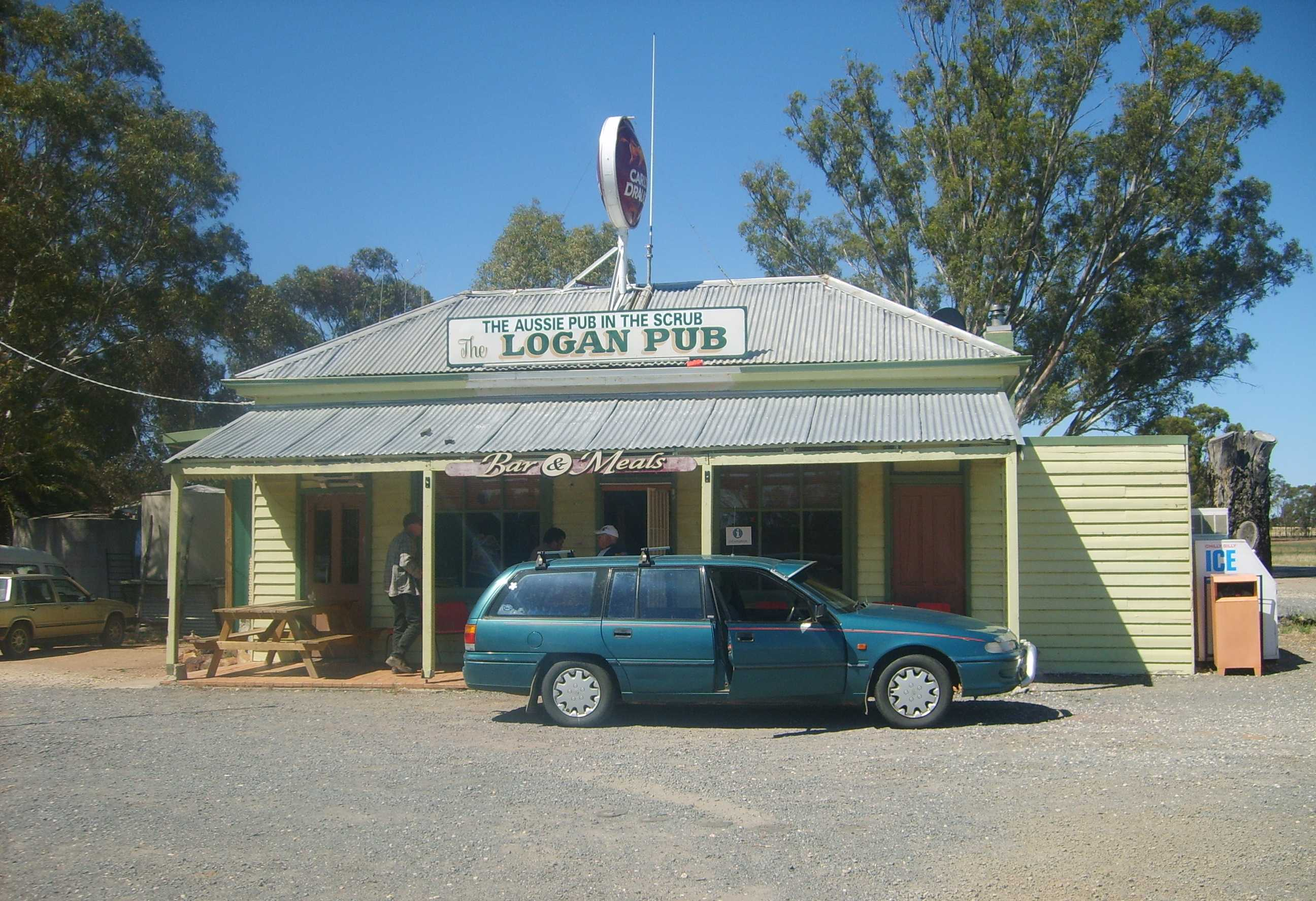
- The Logan Pub

- Coordinates: 36°37′17.6″S 143°29′27.8″E
- Country: Australia
- State: Victoria
- LGA: Shire of Loddon

Government
  - State electorate: Ripon
  - Federal division: Mallee

Population
  - Total: 59 (SAL 2021)
- Postcode: 3475

Logan is a locality in Victoria, Australia. It is located at the intersection of Bendigo-St Arnaud Road (Wimmera Highway) and Logan-Wedderburn Road in the Loddon Shire.

The Logan Pub (or Avoca Forest Hotel) has accommodation and hosts events.

== History ==
Logan was once a larger town during the Victorian Gold Rush. There was a post office, school, two churches, a community hall, a general store and other buildings. Logan Post Office opened on 18 January 1886 and closed in 1974. The locality had a medium-sized oval which was home ground for a local Australian Rules football team.

There have been three pubs in the Logan's history - the first two have been demolished.

== Gallery ==
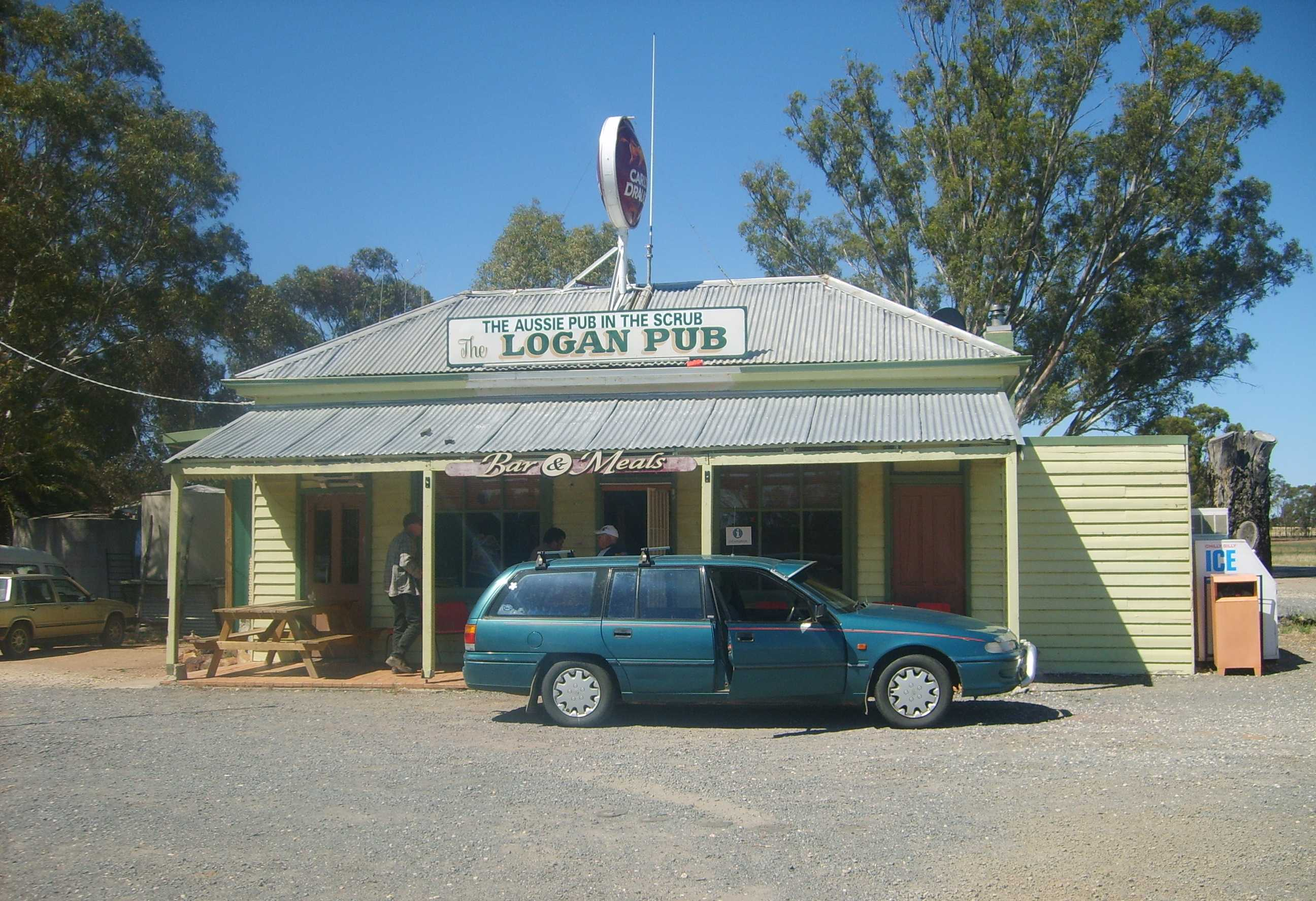
The Logan Pub

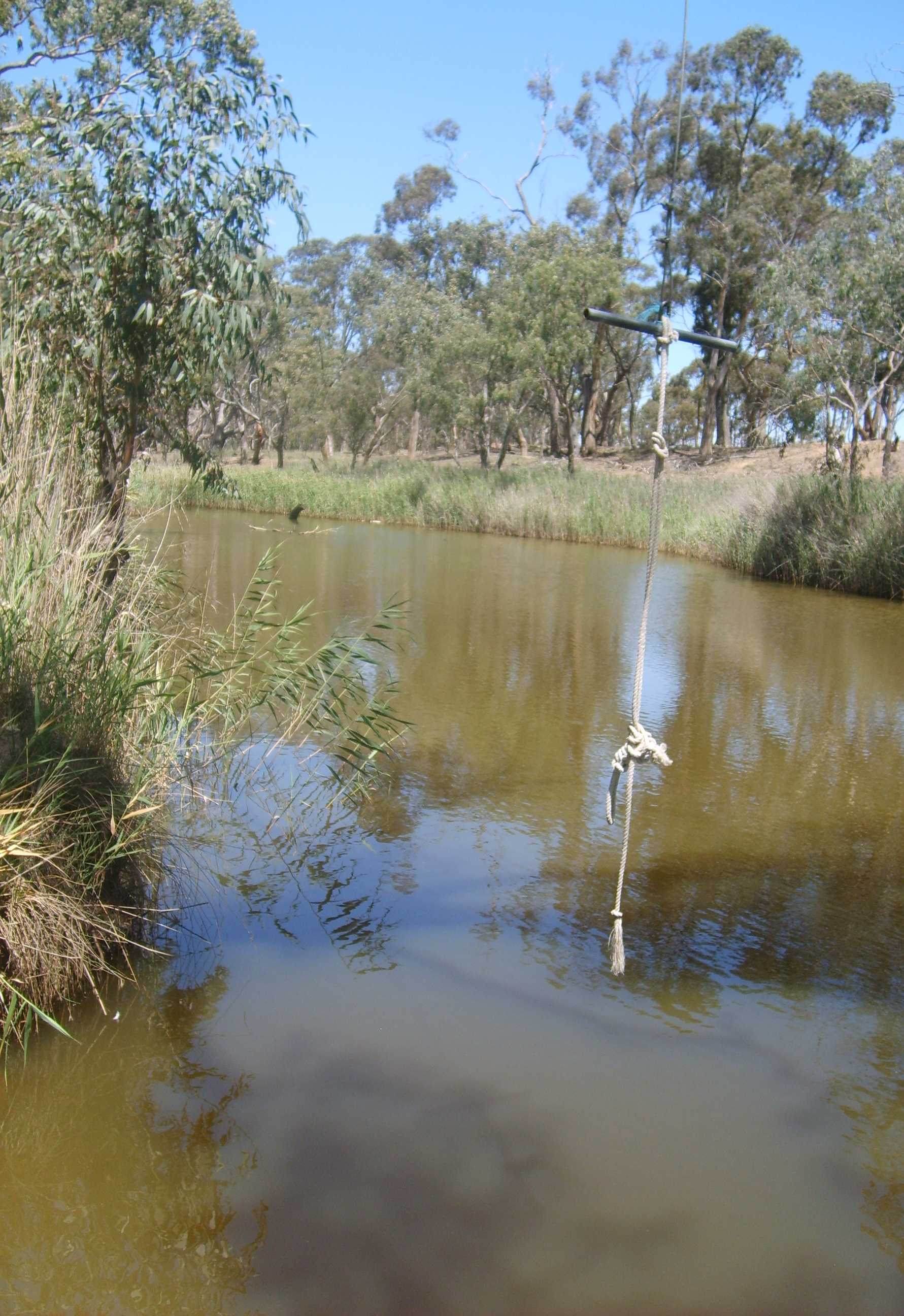
The Avoca River, near Logan

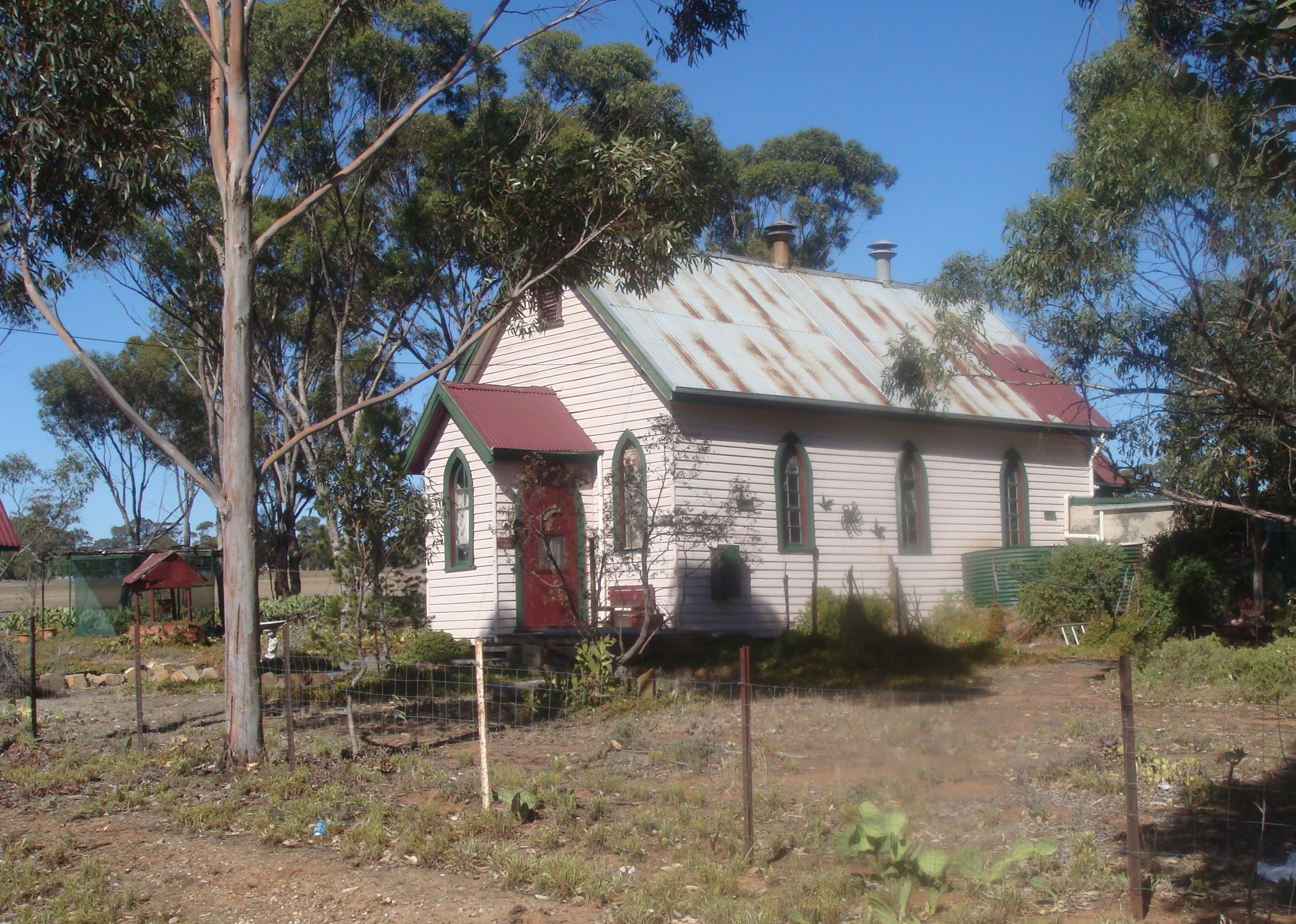
The old church
