= Arnold, Victoria =

Arnold
- Town
- Coordinates: 36°41′0″S 143°52′0″E
- Country: Australia
- State: Victoria
- LGA: Shire of Loddon
- Location: 180 km (110 mi) NW of Melbourne; 44 km (27 mi) W of Bendigo; 12 km (7.5 mi) N of Tarnagulla; 15 km (9.3 mi) S of Inglewood

Government
  - State electorate: Bendigo West
  - Federal division: Mallee

Population
  - Total: 56 (2021 census)
- Postcode: 3551

Arnold is a locality in the Australian state of Victoria, located on Bridgewater - Dunolly Road, in the Shire of Loddon. Originally named Kangadaar, the town became known as Arnold due to a privately owned toll bridge, Arnold Bridge, located at the creek crossing below the locality. The post office opened on 17 December 1888 as Arnold's Bridge, was renamed Arnold Railway Station in 1909, and finally Arnold in 1924. The post office closed in 1989.

The main recreational facility in the town is the Arnold Recreation Centre (The A.R.C), which is home to the cricket team, the Arnold Redbacks.
