= Yando =

Yando Victoria
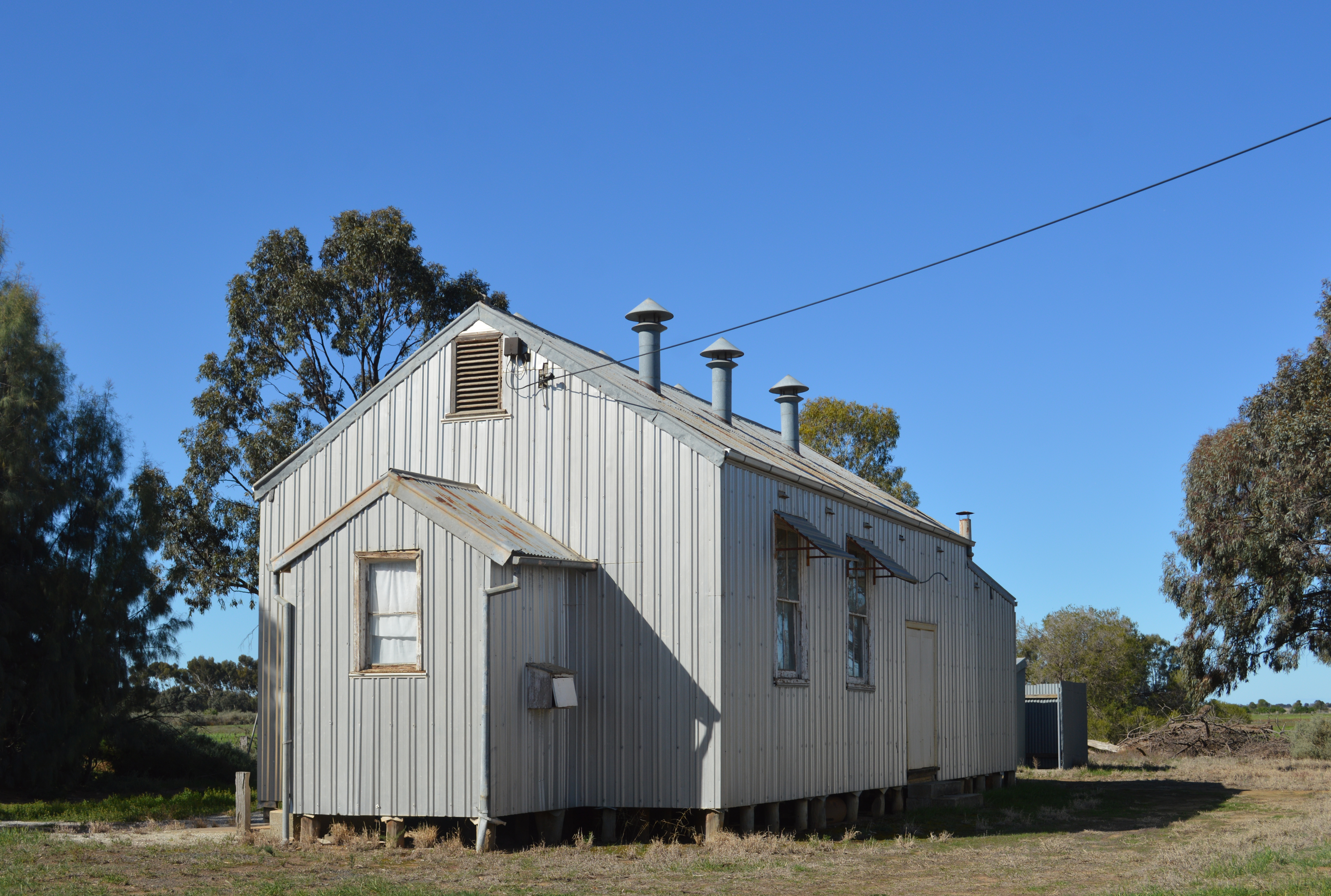
- Public hall at Yando

- Coordinates: 36°05′S 143°48′E
- Population: 40 (2016 census)
- Postcode(s): 3537
- Location: 248 km (154 mi) NNW of Melbourne; 97 km (60 mi) NW of Bendigo; 10 km (6 mi) NE of Boort
- LGA(s): Shire of Loddon
- State electorate(s): Murray Plains
- Federal division(s): Mallee

Yando is a locality in north central Victoria, Australia. The locality is in the Shire of Loddon, 248 kilometres (154 mi) north west of the state capital, Melbourne.

At the 2016 census, Yando had a population of 40.
