= Prairie, Victoria =

Prairie
- Town
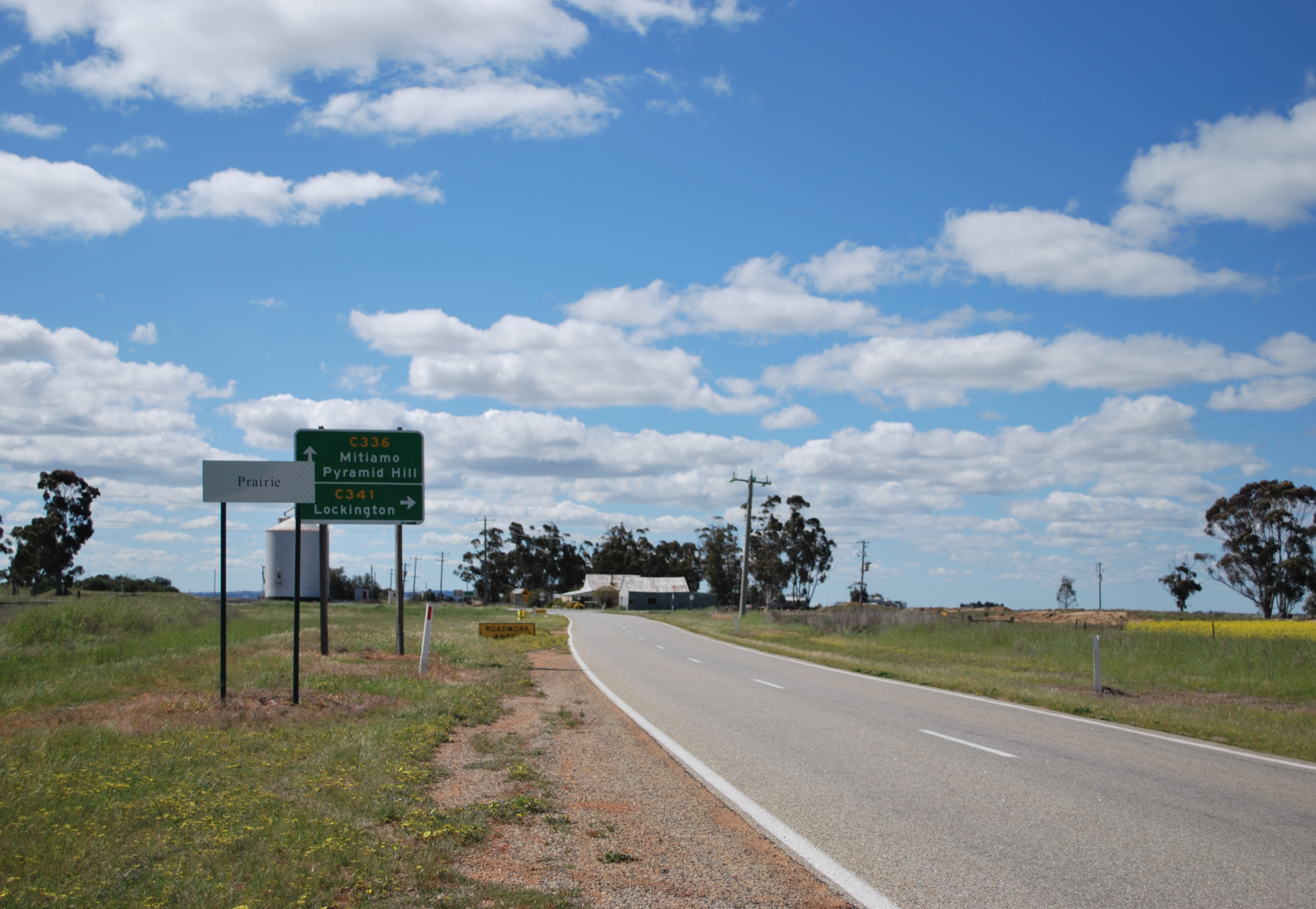
- Entering Prairie

- Coordinates: 36°17′55″S 144°13′56″E
- Country: Australia
- State: Victoria
- LGA: Shire of Loddon
- Location: 208 km (129 mi) NW of Melbourne; 56 km (35 mi) N of Bendigo; 8 km (5.0 mi) N of Dingee

Government
  - State electorate: Bendigo East
  - Federal division: Mallee

Population
  - Total: 37 (2021 census)
- Postcode: 3572

Prairie is a locality in the Shire of Loddon, Victoria, Australia, located 208 kilometres (129 mi) north west of the state capital, Melbourne. At the 2021 census, Prairie had a population of 37.
