= Mincha, Victoria =

Mincha
- Town
- Coordinates: 36°00′01″S 144°04′36″E
- Country: Australia
- State: Victoria
- LGA: Shire of Loddon

Government
  - State electorate: Murray Plains
  - Federal division: Mallee

Population
  - Total: 62 (2021 census)
- Postcode: 3575

Mincha is a locality in the Shire of Loddon, Victoria, Australia. At the 2021 census, Mincha had a population of 62.

== History ==
Agricultural settlement began in the Mincha area in the 1870s, bringing early infrastructure with it. By the end of the decade, three small district schools had been established. Transport links improved with the arrival of the railway from Pyramid Hill in 1884, and over time this shifted the centre of activity closer to the station. A single school was opened there in 1909, replacing the earlier schools.

The later introduction of irrigation changed local production patterns and encouraged the expansion of dairy farming. During the first half of the twentieth century Mincha supported a butter factory before operations were centralised at Pyramid Hill and the plant closed in 1949. At various times Mincha has also contained services such as a railway workshop, hotel, store, and public hall. The last remaining school, Mincha West Primary School, closed in 1991.
