= Woodstock West, Victoria =

Woodstock West
- Town
- Coordinates: 36°49′18″S 143°59′22″E
- Country: Australia
- State: Victoria
- LGA: Shire of Loddon

Government
  - State electorate: Ripon
  - Federal division: Mallee

Population
  - Total: 45 (2021 census)
- Postcode: 3463

Woodstock West is a locality in the Shire of Loddon, Victoria, Australia. At the 2021 census, Woodstock West had a population of 45.
