= Nine Mile, Victoria =

Nine Mile
- Town
- Coordinates: 36°26′54″S 143°28′2″E
- Country: Australia
- State: Victoria
- LGAs: Shire of Loddon; Shire of Buloke

Government
  - State electorate: Ripon
  - Federal division: Mallee

Population
  - Total: 19 (2021 census)
- Postcode: 3518

Nine Mile is a locality in the Shire of Loddon and the Shire of Buloke, Victoria, Australia. At the 2021 census, Nine Mile had a population of 19.
