= Canary Island, Victoria =

Canary Island
- Town
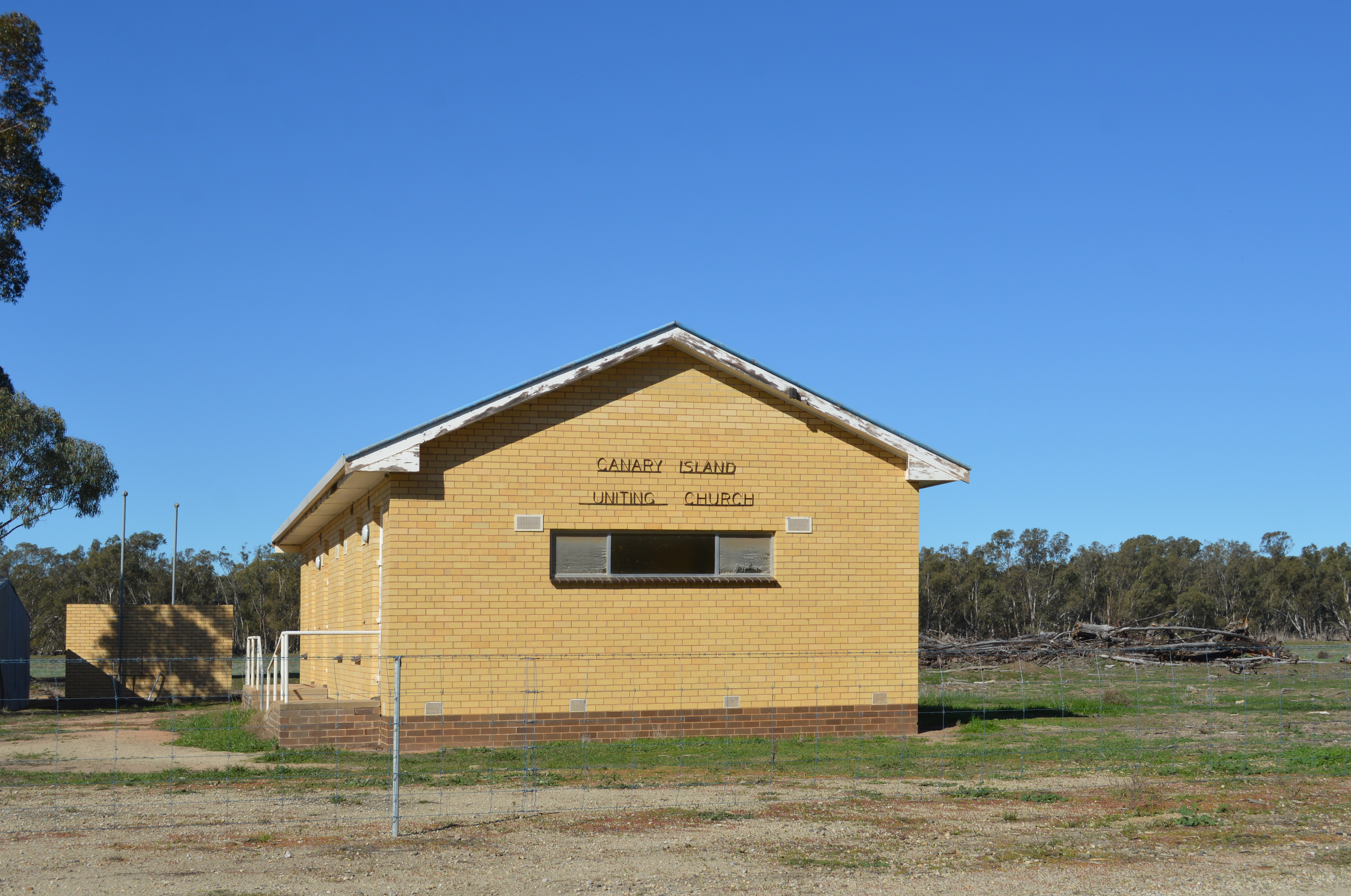
- Canary Island Uniting Church

- Coordinates: 35°59′22″S 143°50′38″E
- Country: Australia
- State: Victoria
- LGA: Shire of Loddon
- Location: 259 km (161 mi) NNW of Melbourne; 107 km (66 mi) NW of Bendigo; 36 km (22 mi) N of Kerang

Government
  - State electorate: Murray Plains
  - Federal division: Mallee

Population
  - Total: 10 (2016 census)
- Postcode: 3537

Canary Island is a locality in north central Victoria, Australia. The locality is in the Shire of Loddon and on the Loddon River, 259 kilometres (161 mi) north west of the state capital, Melbourne. The locality is an inland island formed by Twelve Mile Creek, an anabranch of the Loddon River.

At the 2016 census, Canary Island had a population of 10.
