= Borung =

Borung Victoria
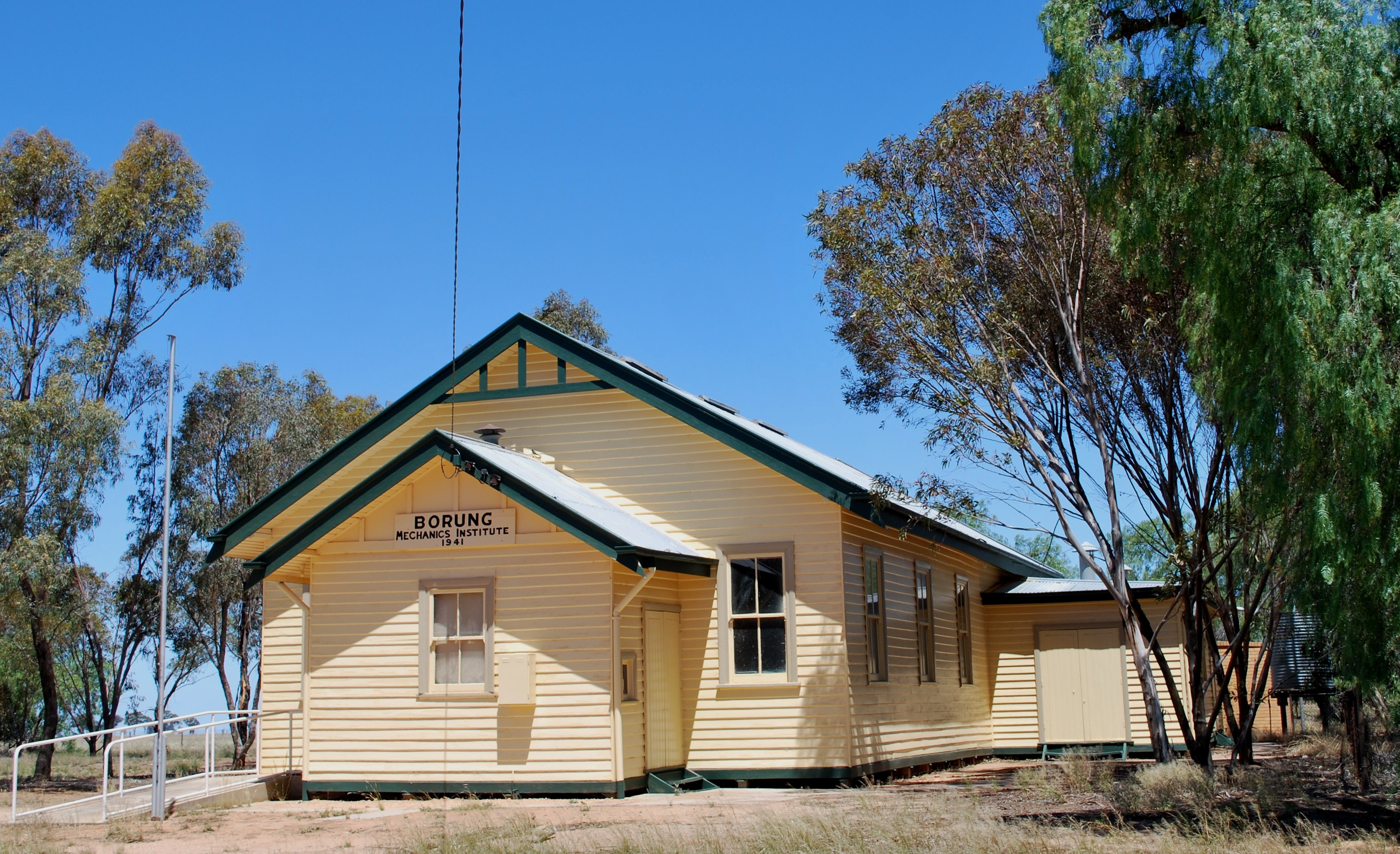
- Mechanics Institute at Borung, built in 1941

- Coordinates: 36°17′32″S 143°44′58″E
- Population: 82 (2016 census)
- Postcode(s): 3518
- Location: 234 km (145 mi) NW of Melbourne; 83 km (52 mi) NW of Bendigo; 21 km (13 mi) NE of Wedderburn
- LGA(s): Shire of Loddon
- State electorate(s): Ripon
- Federal division(s): Mallee

Borung is a locality in north central Victoria, Australia. The locality is in the Shire of Loddon, 234 kilometres (145 mi) north west of the state capital, Melbourne.

At the 2016 census, Borung had a population of 82.
