= Mologa, Victoria =

Mologa
- Town
- Coordinates: 36°09′09″S 144°07′53″E
- Country: Australia
- State: Victoria
- LGA: Shire of Loddon

Government
  - State electorate: Murray Plains
  - Federal division: Mallee

Population
  - Total: 20 (2021 census)
- Postcode: 3575

Mologa is a locality in the Shire of Loddon, Victoria, Australia. At the 2021 census, Mologa had a population of 20.

== History ==
The name is believed to be derived from a Barababaraba word meaning "sand hill". Multiple schools were opened in the locality between 1876 and 1880 after farming began in the area. Mologa Railway Station opened in 1884 and closed in 1972.

In September 1886, a public meeting at Mologa protested an attempt by some selectors to lease parts of the Terrick State Forest in 1,000‑acre blocks. Residents of the plains relied on the forest for firewood, fencing timber, and other supplies. The meeting resolved to request the Shire of Gordon Council to have the forest and unalienated land along Bullock and Piccaninny Creeks proclaimed a farmers' common.

Following World War I, residents of Mologa organised public meetings in 1919 to establish a local war memorial, deciding to erect a stone column honouring all who served and commemorating those from the district who were killed. The memorial was completed and unveiled on 24 March 1920 by C. Marlow, whose five sons enlisted in the war, three of whom died.
