= Wehla =

- Town
- Coordinates: 36°36′11″S 143°36′53″E
- Country: Australia
- State: Victoria
- LGA: Shire of Loddon

Government
  - State electorate: Ripon
  - Federal division: Mallee

Population
  - Total: 41 (2021 census)
- Postcode: 3518

Wehla is a locality in the Shire of Loddon, Victoria, Australia. At the 2021 census, Wehla had a population of 41.
