= Tragowel =

- Town
- Coordinates: 35°51′S 143°59′E
- Country: Australia
- State: Victoria
- LGA: Shire of Gannawarra
- Location: 267 km (166 mi) NW of Melbourne; 118 km (73 mi) N of Bedigo; 19 km (12 mi) S of Kerang

Government
  - State electorate: Swan Hill
  - Federal division: Mallee

Population
  - Total: 83 (2021 census)
- Postcode: 3579

Tragowel is a locality in the north-western Victoria, Australia. It is located 267 kilometres (166 mi) north-north-west of the state capital, Melbourne.

== History ==
The Tragowel Plains Irrigation Trust (1886) and the Macorna North Irrigation Trust (1893), provided water for farms, crop irrigation and livestock.

== Burke and Wills ==
The expedition by Burke and Wills to the Gulf of Carpentaria passed through the Tragowel area. On 2 September 1860, the expedition, led by Robert O'Hara Burke, arrived at the homestead of Abraham Booth and John Holloway, called Tragowell Station (later renamed Tragowel Estate), on the Loddon River.. The homestead has since been demolished, but a piano played by Burke still exists, and is owned by Holloway's grandson.

== Demographics ==
In the 2021 census, the population of Tragowel was 83, 53.2% males and 46.8% females, with a median age of 48.

== Transport ==
Tragowel is not situated on any major highways, but the Loddon Valley Highway runs 4 km to the west of the town. There are currently no sealed roads leading into or out of the town.

The Piangil railway line runs through the town, but Tragowel railway station closed in the 1970s and nothing remains of it.

The nearest airport is located in Kerang. There are no regular flights in or out of the airport.
