= Serpentine, Victoria =

Serpentine
- Town
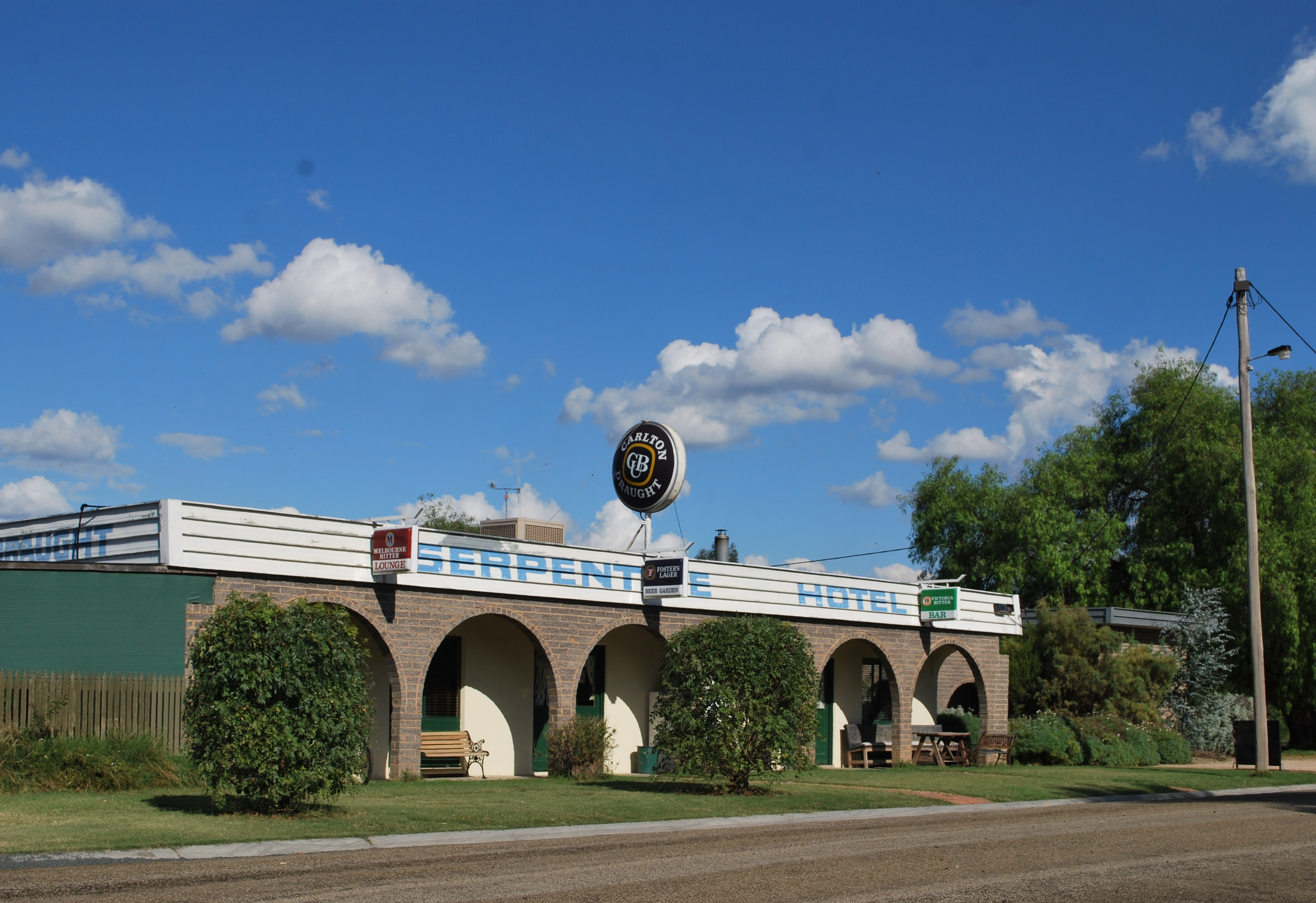
- Serpentine Hotel

- Coordinates: 36°24′0″S 143°58′0″E
- Country: Australia
- State: Victoria
- LGA: Shire of Loddon
- Location: 200 km (120 mi) NW of Melbourne; 50 km (31 mi) NW of Bendigo; 138 km (86 mi) SE of Swan Hill
- Established: 1863

Government
  - State electorate: Bendigo East
  - Federal division: Mallee

Population
  - Total: 192 (2016 census)
- Postcode: 3517

Serpentine is a town in north west Victoria, Australia. Located on the Loddon Valley Highway, the town is 201 kilometres north west of the state capital, Melbourne and 51 kilometres north west of the regional centre, Bendigo. Serpentine is in the Shire of Loddon local government area and, including the surrounding state suburb, had a population of 222 at the 2021 census.

The town is named for Serpentine Creek, a tributary of the Loddon River. The creek in turn was named for explorer Thomas Mitchell's description of the river red gum trees lining the rivers and creeks of the area.

Selectors began to take up allotments in 1862 and the townsite was established as Serpentine Creek in 1863. A Post Office under that name had been open since 1848, the name being changed to Serpentine in 1917.

It eventually became the seat of the then Shire of East Loddon. Today, Serpentine is a producer of grain and cattle and a popular place for anglers.

The Burke and Wills expedition is alleged to have passed the townsite in 1860 while attempting to reach the Gulf of Carpentaria.

The town has an Australian Rules football team Bears Lagoon Serpentine competing in the Loddon Valley Football League.
