= Shire of Loddon =

Coordinates: 36°25′06″S 143°52′00″E

- Local government area
- Location in Victoria

- Interactive map of Shire of Loddon
- Country: Australia
- State: Victoria
- Region: Loddon Mallee
- Established: 1995
- Council seat: Wedderburn

Government
  - Mayor: Cr Dan Straub
  - State electorates: Bendigo East; Bendigo West; Murray Plains; Ripon
  - Federal division: Mallee

Area
  - Total: 6,696 km^{2} (2,585 sq mi)

Population
  - Total: 7,759 (2021)
  - Density: 1.15875/km^{2} (3.0012/sq mi)
- Gazetted: 19 January 1995
- Website: Shire of Loddon
LGAs around Shire of Loddon
Gannawarra	Gannawarra	Campaspe
Buloke	Shire of Loddon	Greater Bendigo
Northern Grampians	Central Goldfields	Mount Alexander

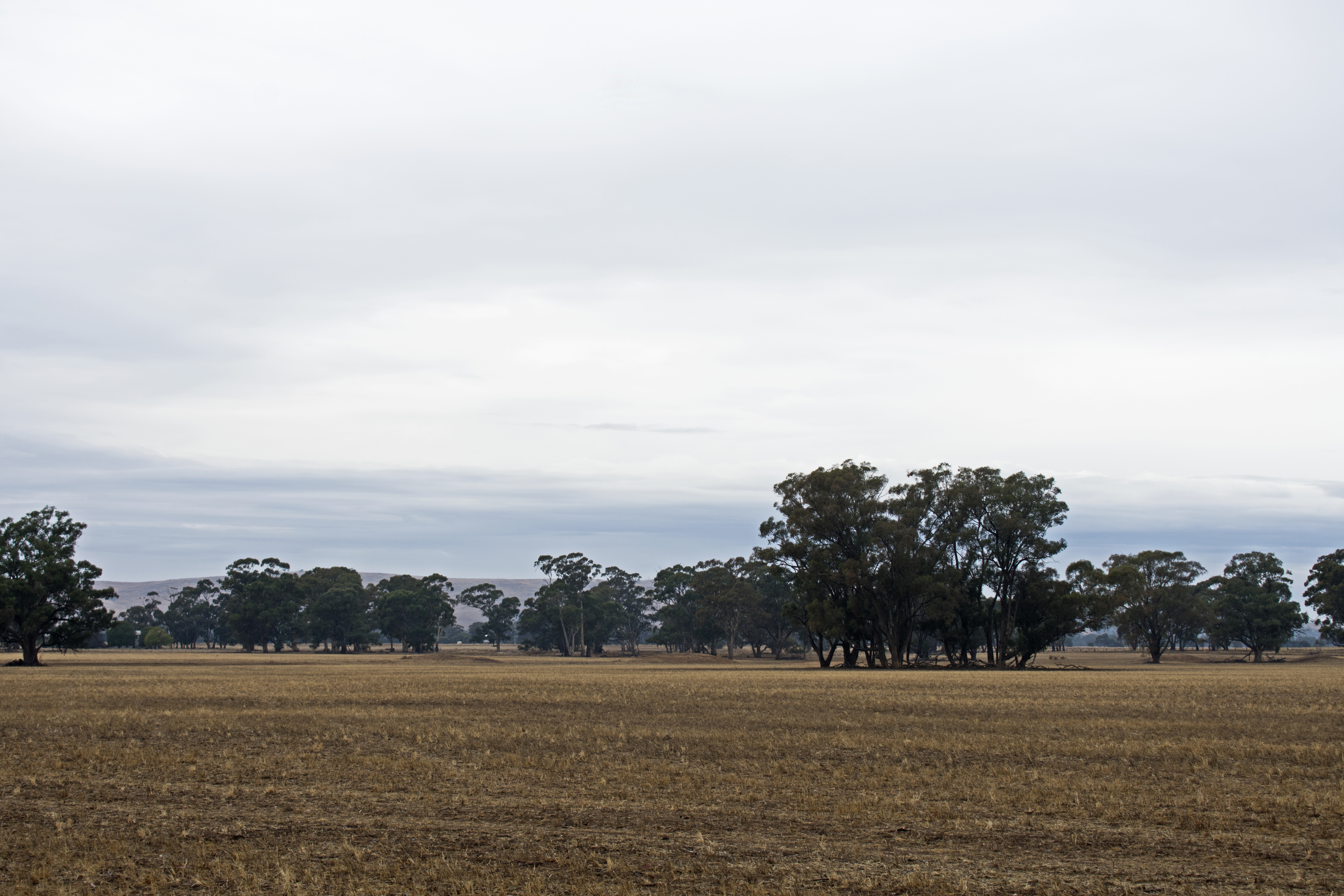
Trees south of Wedderburn Road, Gowar East

The Shire of Loddon is a local government area in Victoria, Australia, located in the northern part of the state. It covers an area of 6,696 square kilometres (2,585 mi^{2}) and in 2021 had a population of 7,759. It includes the towns of Inglewood, Boort, Serpentine, Pyramid Hill, Tarnagulla and Wedderburn.

The Shire is governed and administered by the Loddon Shire Council; its seat of local government and administrative centre is located at the council headquarters in Wedderburn. There is also a service centre located in Serpentine. The Shire is named after the Loddon River, a major geographical feature that meanders through the LGA.

== History ==
The Shire of Loddon was formed in 1995 from the amalgamation of the Shire of East Loddon, Shire of Gordon, Shire of Korong, and parts of the Rural City of Marong, Shire of Bet Bet, Shire of Maldon and Shire of Tullaroop.

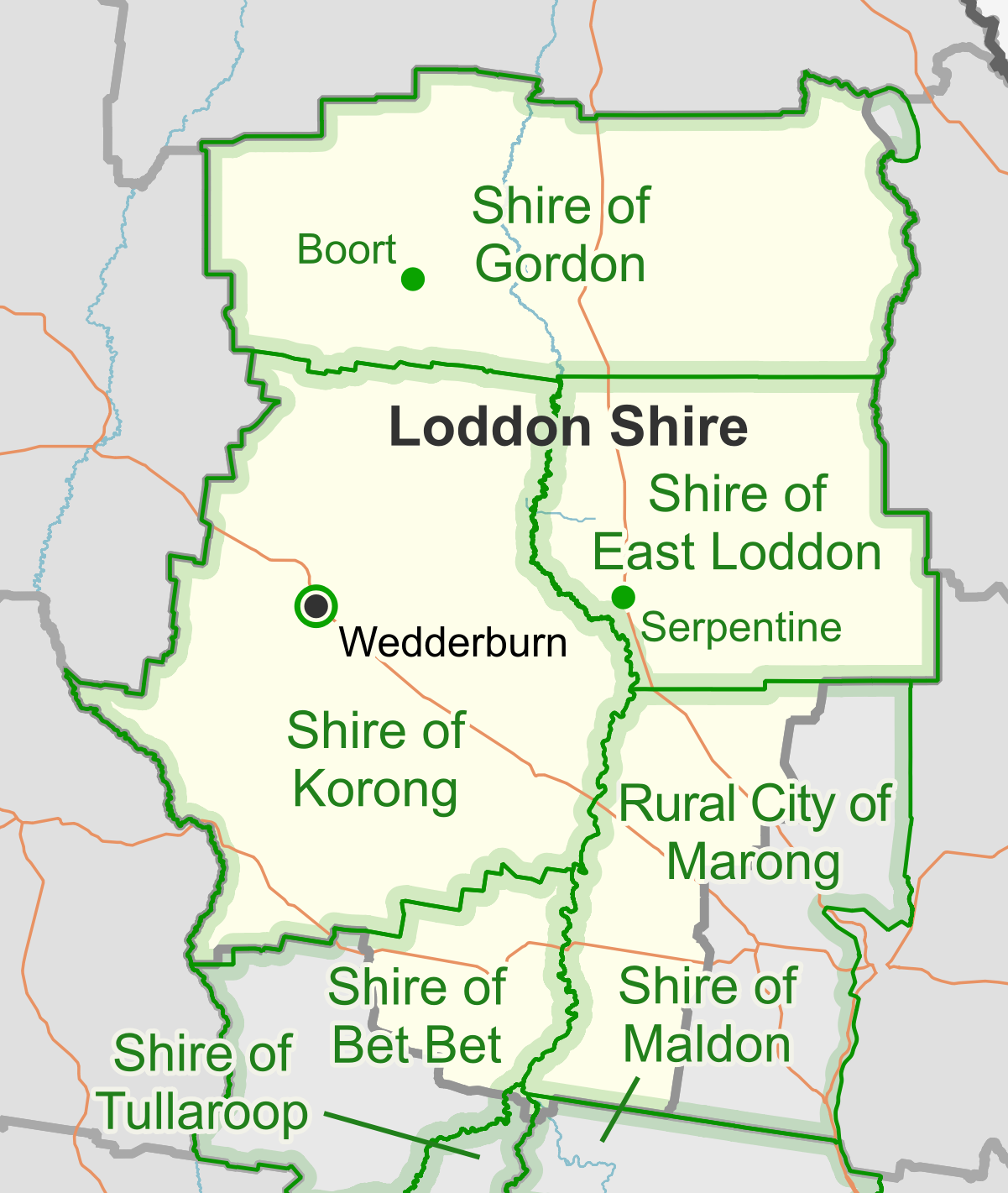
Loddon Shire's predecessor LGAs (green) as they were in 1994. The administrative centres of the former LGAs are marked by green dots.

== Council ==
=== Current composition ===
The council is composed of five wards and five councillors, with one councillor per ward elected to represent each ward.

Ward	Councillor	Notes
Boort	Neil Beattie	
Inglewood	Wendy Murphy	
Tarnagulla	Linda Jungwirth	
Terrick	Dan Straub	Mayor
Wedderburn	Gavan Holt	

=== Administration and governance ===
The council meets in the council chambers at the Wedderburn Municipal Offices. It also provides customer services at both its administrative centre in Wedderburn, and its service centre in Serpentine.

== Traditional owners ==
The Dja Dja Wurrung and Barababaraba are the traditional owners of this land.

== Townships and localities ==
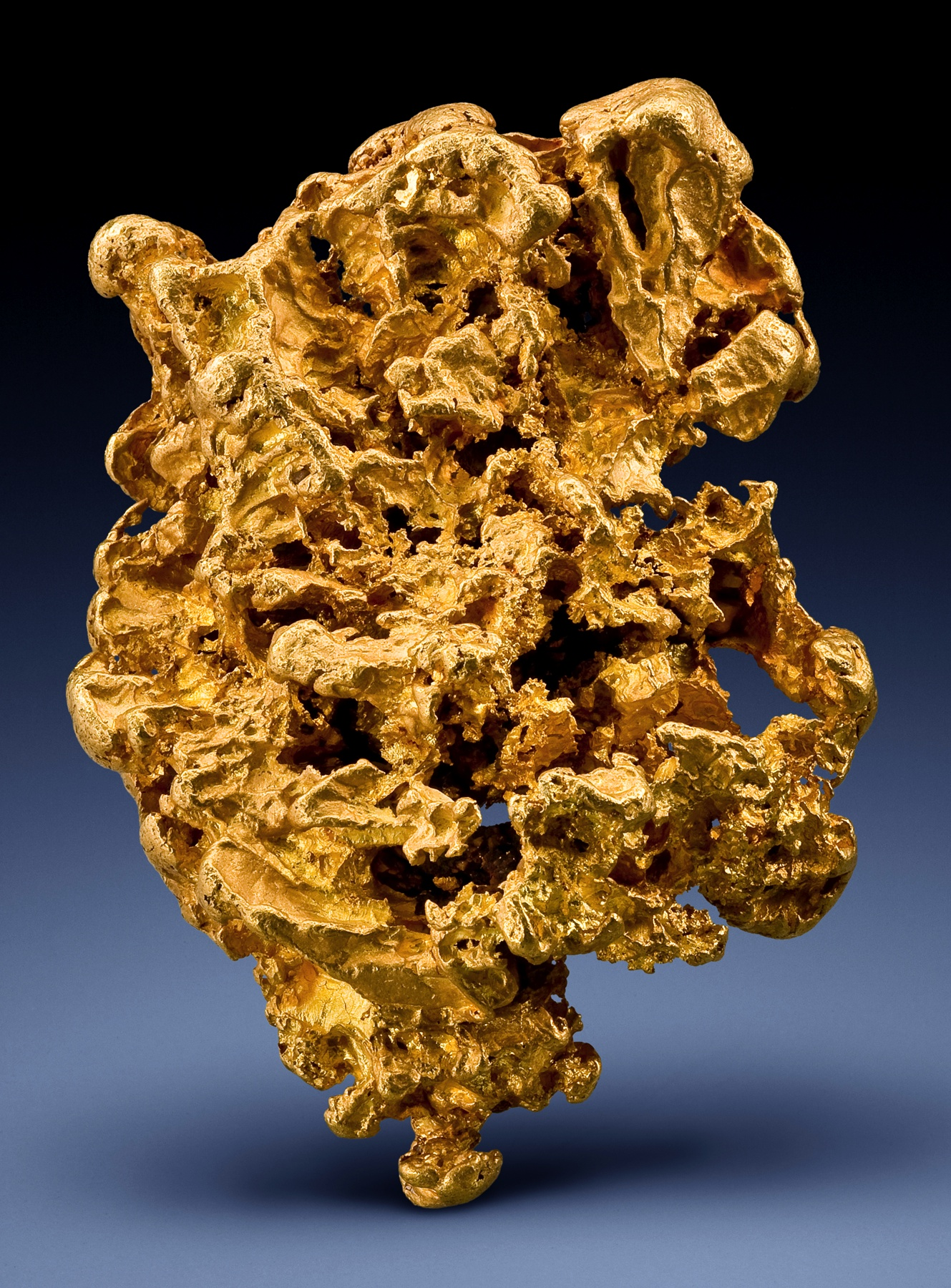
Large gold specimen from Wychitella, Loddon Shire

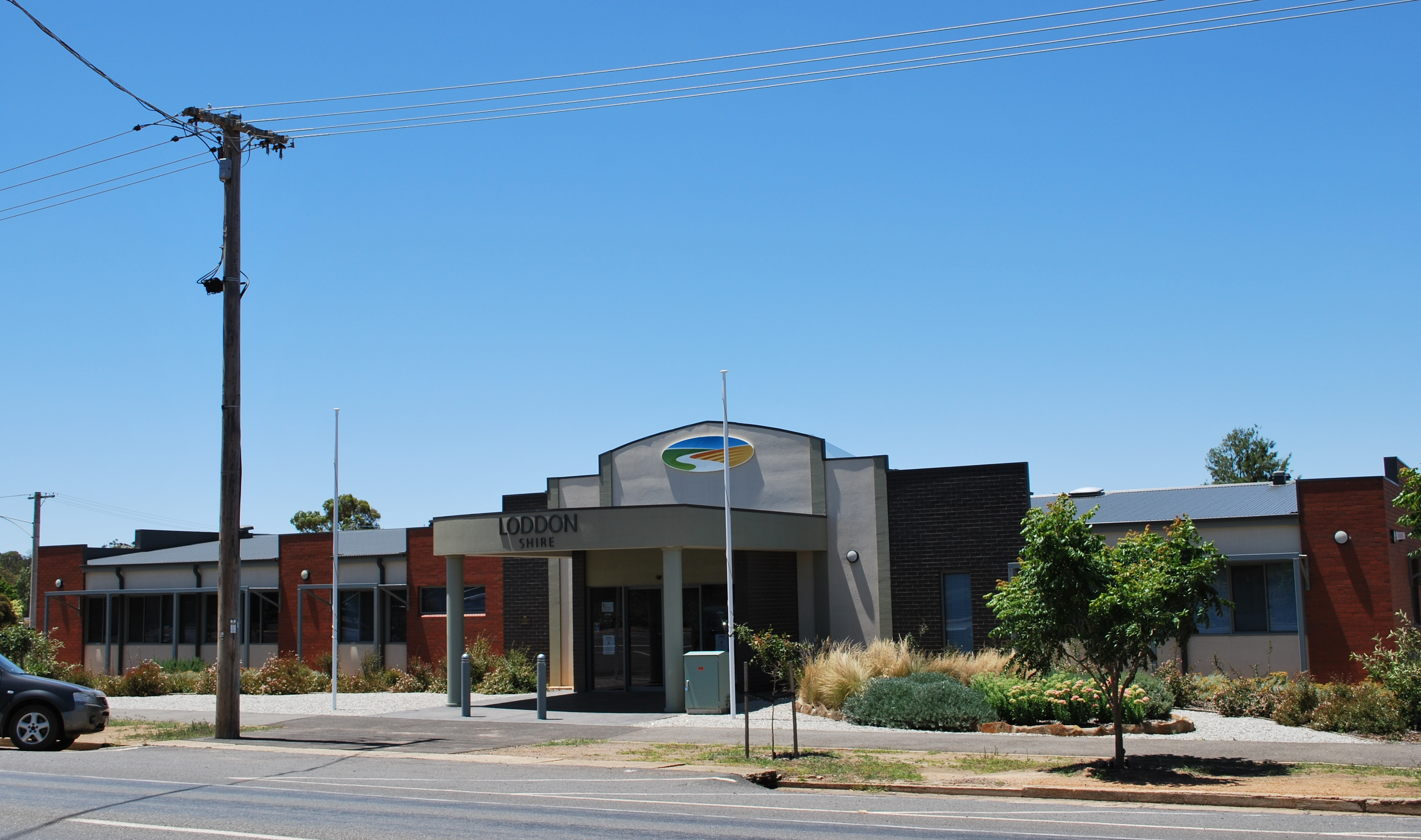
Loddon Shire Council offices at Wedderburn

The 2021 census recorded the shire's population of 7,759, compared to 7,516 in the 2016 census.

Population
Locality	2016	2021
Appin South^	29	38
Arnold	47	56
Arnold West	22	19
Auchmore	13	5
Barraport	37	45
Barraport West	10	5
Bealiba^	206	213
Bears Lagoon	72	53
Berrimal	46	52
Boort	873	940
Borung	82	59
Brenanah	28	29
Bridgewater	142	133
Bridgewater North	57	54
Bridgewater On Loddon	326	341
Buckrabanyule^	51	52
Burkes Flat	14	20
Calivil	178	178
Campbells Forest	45	50
Canary Island	10	4
Catumnal	18	14
Cochranes Creek	9	9
Coonooer Bridge^	31	30
Derby	17	18
Dingee	206	195
Dunolly^	893	899
Durham Ox	74	60
Eastville^	24	13
Eddington^	96	113
Emu^	32	37
Fentons Creek	24	27
Fernihurst	20	32
Fiery Flat	25	28
Gladfield	24	32
Glenalbyn	19	21
Glenloth East^	13	14
Goldsborough^	36	37
Gowar East^	20	23
Gredgwin^	15	13
Horfield^	91	93
Inglewood	855	886
Inkerman^	*	#
Jarklin	37	49
Jungaburra	0	0
Kamarooka^	92	89
Kamarooka North	15	9
Kingower	32	46
Kinypanial	11	12
Korong Vale	168	143
Kurraca	7	5
Kurraca West	10	0
Kurting	53	61
Laanecoorie	177	179
Lake Marmal^	21	21
Lake Meran^	23	22
Leaghur	19	20
Leichardt^	125	167
Leitchville^	558	576
Llanelly	38	62
Loddon Vale	31	24
Logan^	53	59
Macorna^	87	67
Marong^	1,416	2,005
McIntyre	42	47
Meering West^	13	12
Milloo^	35	37
Mincha	50	62
Minmindie	21	13
Mitiamo^	117	116
Moliagul^	88	80
Mologa	29	20
Murphys Creek	37	46
Mysia	43	26
Newbridge	192	171
Nine Mile^	22	19
Painswick	5	14
Pompapiel	50	38
Powlett Plains	42	38
Prairie	66	37
Pyramid Hill	558	598
Raywood^	318	329
Rheola	56	52
Richmond Plains^	3	9
Salisbury West	21	38
Sebastian^	217	251
Serpentine	192	222
Shelbourne^	452	423
Skinners Flat	26	27
Slaty Creek^	37	34
Sylvaterre	17	22
Tandarra	48	55
Tarnagulla	133	153
Terrappee^	22	20
Terrick Terrick	11	8
Waanyarra	22	57
Wedderburn	941	951
Wedderburn Junction	20	20
Wehla	39	41
Woodstock On Loddon	28	36
Woodstock West	41	45
Woolshed Flat	3	13
Woosang^	11	12
Wychitella	31	29
Wychitella North	9	18
Yando	40	45
Yarraberb	23	17
Yarrawalla	90	78
Yeungroon East^	16	11

^ - Territory divided with another LGA
* - Not noted in 2016 Census
# - Not noted in 2021 Census

== See also ==
- List of places on the Victorian Heritage Register in the Shire of Loddon
