= 1958 Melbourne Carnival =

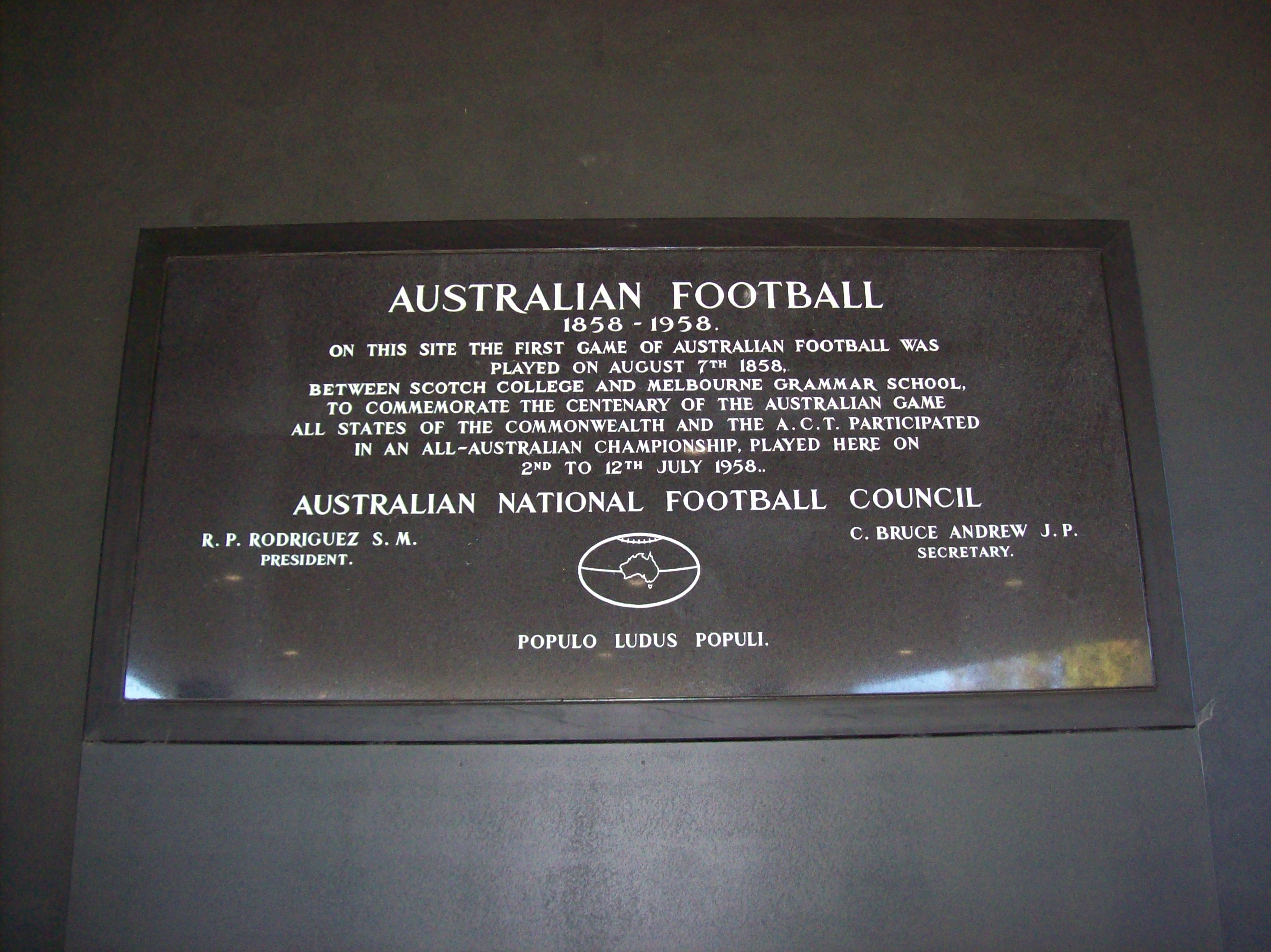
- The stone laid at the Melbourne Cricket Ground to commemorate the Centenary Carnival

Tournament information
- Sport: Australian football
- Location: Melbourne, Australia
- Dates: 2 July 1958–12 July 1958
- Format: Round Robin
- Teams: 9

Final champion
- SECTION A: Victoria; SECTION B: Australia Amateurs

The 1958 Melbourne Carnival was the 14th edition of the Australian National Football Carnival, an Australian football interstate competition. It was the last carnival to be hosted by the state of Victoria and was also known as the Centenary Carnival as it celebrated 100 years since the creation of the sport.

For the first time since the 1950 Brisbane Carnival, all nine eligible teams in both Section 1 and Section 2 competed at the carnival. Section 1 consisted of two Victorian teams from the (VFL and VFA), South Australia, Western Australia and Tasmania; Section 2 consisted of New South Wales, Canberra, Queensland and the Australian Amateurs. In 1953 and 1956, only the Section 1 teams had travelled for the carnival, but the ANFC decided to bring all nine teams to mark the centenary celebration.

Prior to the carnival, the ANFC announced that Section 1 was to be reduced from five teams to four teams for the following carnival (held Brisbane in 1961); the team which finished last in Section 1 was to be relegated to Section 2 for 1961.

The Carnival was held between 2 July and 12 July. Day matches were held at the Melbourne Cricket Ground, and night matches were held at the South Melbourne Cricket Ground. Overall, the ANFC made a loss of more than £11,000 on the carnival, similar in magnitude to the loss made on the previous nine-team carnival in 1950.

== Results ==
In Section 1, the Victoria (VFL) was the only undefeated team; forward John Dugdale was the carnival's leading goalkicker with 18. Western Australia and Tasmania each finished with records of 2–2; it was the most successful carnival result in Tasmania's history, with wins against both South Australia and Western Australia. Last place was decided in the match on 11 July, when South Australia's large win over the VFA saw the clubs equal on 1–3, and saw South Australia overtake the VFA on percentage.

In Section 2, the Australian Amateurs were undefeated. Australian Capital Territory, which had contested the carnivals since 1933, recorded its first and second carnival wins of all time. New South Wales was the only winless team for the carnival.

	Section 1
Wednesday, 2 July	Victoria (VFA) 15.12 (102)	def.	Tasmania 13.16 (94)	Melbourne Cricket Ground (crowd: 5,852)
Wednesday, 2 July (night)	Western Australia 11.12 (78)	def.	South Australia 7.18 (60)	South Melbourne Cricket Ground (crowd: 4,500)
Saturday, 5 July	Victoria (VFL) 25.17 (167)	def.	South Australia 7.7 (49)	Melbourne Cricket Ground (crowd: 33,063)
Saturday, 5 July (night)	Tasmania 13.16 (94)	def.	Western Australia 11.12 (78)	South Melbourne Cricket Ground (crowd: 3,000)
Monday, 7 July	Tasmania 11.18 (84)	def.	South Australia 11.16 (82)	Melbourne Cricket Ground (crowd: 2,760)
Monday, 7 July (night)	Victoria (VFL) 13.23 (101)	def.	Victoria (VFA) 7.10 (52)	South Melbourne Cricket Ground (crowd: 7,200)
Wednesday, 9 July	Western Australia 21.16 (142)	def.	Victoria (VFA) 11.8 (74)	Melbourne Cricket Ground (crowd: 3,074)
Wednesday, 9 July (night)	Victoria (VFL) 25.14 (164)	def.	Tasmania 8.14 (62)	South Melbourne Cricket Ground (crowd: 3,500)
Friday, 11 July (night)	South Australia 16.15 (111)	def.	Victoria (VFA) 5.13 (43)	South Melbourne Cricket Ground (crowd: 1,750)
Saturday, 12 July	Victoria (VFL) 14.13 (97)	def.	Western Australia 11.12 (78)	Melbourne Cricket Ground (crowd: 23,238)

	Section 2
Thursday, 3 July	Queensland 11.18 (84)	def.	New South Wales 11.13 (79)	Melbourne Cricket Ground (crowd: 1,874^{CR})
Thursday, 3 July	Australian Amateurs 18.15 (123)	def.	Aust. Cap. Territory 9.15 (69)	Melbourne Cricket Ground (crowd: 1,874)
Monday, 7 July	Aust. Cap. Territory 12.10 (82)	def.	New South Wales 9.13 (67)	Melbourne Cricket Ground (crowd: 2,760^{CR})
Wednesday, 9 July	Australian Amateurs 22.11 (143)	def.	Queensland 8.8 (56)	Melbourne Cricket Ground (crowd: 3,074^{CR})
Friday, 11 July	Australian Amateurs 10.16 (76)	def.	New South Wales 9.12 (66)	Melbourne Cricket Ground
Saturday, 12 July	Aust. Cap. Territory 18.11 (119)	def.	Queensland 4.5 (29)	Melbourne Cricket Ground (crowd: 23,238^{CR})

CR: indicates that this match was a curtain-raiser; the crowd figure given is for the main match.

== Squads ==
=== Section 1 ===
Victoria (VFL) - 1st
Owen Abrahams | Graham Arthur | Allen Aylett | Ron Barassi | Reg Burgess | Jack Clarke | Bruce Comben | Len Crane | Bob Davis (captain) | Paul Dodd | John Dugdale | Brendan Edwards | Ray Gabelich | Fred Goldsmith | John James | Bob Johnson | Geoff Leek | Ron McDonald | Laurie Mithen | Kevin Murray | Neil Roberts | John Schultz | Bob Skilton | Harry Sullivan | Noel Teasdale | Ted Whitten (vice-captain) | Don Williams | Norm Smith (coach)

Western Australia - 2nd
Don Byfield | John Colgan | Jack Clarke (captain) | Graham Farmer (vice-captain) | Brian Foley | John Gerovich | Keith Harper | Cliff Hillier | Percy Johnson | Ross Kelly | Laurie Kettlewell | Bill Mose | Les Mumme | Tony Parentich | Roy Porter | Alan Preen | Ray Richards | Norm Rogers | Paul Seal | Ray Sorrell | John Todd | John Watts | Barry White | Barry Wilson | George Moloney (coach)

Tasmania - 3rd
Len Adams | Roy Apted | Darrel Baldock | Roger Chapman | Neil Conlan | Brian Eade | John Fitzallen | Don Fraser | Don Gale | Rex Garwood | Max Griffiths | Geoff Hill | Arthur Hodgson | John Leedham (captain)| Trevor Leo | Geoff Long | Brian Loring | George Mason | Colin Moore | Joe Murphy | Derek Parremore | Jeff Patterson | B. Pierce | Jim Ross (vice-captain) | Terry Shadbolt | Stuart Spencer | Bill Williams

South Australia - 4th
John Abley | Barry Barbary | Dave Boyd | Haydn Bunton, Jr. | Graham Christie | Stan Costello | Neil Davies (vice-captain)| Don Gilbourne | Ian Hannaford | Neville Hayes | Lindsay Head | Max Hewitt | Neil Kerley | Ron Kitchen | Don Lindner | Ken McGregor | Geof Motley | Dennis Rattigan | Ralph Rogerson | Brian Sawley | Ken Tierney | Ted Whelan | Fos Williams (captain)| Glyn Williams

Victoria (VFA)
Bob Atkinson | Reg Backman | Frank Bourke | Bob Bonnett | Peter Box | Jack Brennan | Alan Carey | John Coughlan | Len Crane | Terry Devery | Jack Evans | Dick Evans | Len Gilder (vice-captain)| Alan Gooch | Doug Hayes | Lin Huntington | Reg Lewis | Colin Love | Brian Manie | Barry Metcalfe | Ken Ross (captain) | Kevin Symons | Jack Whiley | Kevin White | Bob Withers | Col Austen (coach)

=== Section 2 ===
Australian Amateurs
R. Bray (SA) | R. Burt (Vic) | A. Capes (Vic) | B. Dickson (SA) | R. Drew (WA) | L. Eborall (WA) | L. Eldering (Vic) | R. Featherby (WA) | D. Goldsmith (Tas) | L. Grant (Vic) | R. Hewitt (vice-captain, SA) | Geoff Hibbins (captain, Vic) | Ian Law (Vic) | K. Miles (WA) | J. Nelson (Vic) | R. Omond (Tas) | A. Pinkus (Vic) | R. Powell (SA) | R. Price (WA) | B. Rundle (SA) | B. Seppelt (SA) | N. Stokes (Vic) | K. Taylor (Tas) | J. Winneke (Vic) | Ray Martin (coach)

Australian Capital Territory
Warren Barnes | Alex Bradley | Barry Browning | Peter Curtis | Pat Galvin | Mick Gaughwin | Ian Grigg (vice-captain) | Alan Hawke | Harry Heinrich | Ray Hincksman | Tony Irvine | John Moody | Alan Muir | Jim Muir | Ron Paton | Alan Ray | David Reid | Neil Robson | Alan Rogers | Gerry Walsh (captain) | Graham Werner | John Wheeler | Mal Wheeler | Ken Williams | Roy Williams | Ray Donellan (coach)

Queensland
T. Broadbent | J. Conlon | R J. Crosthwaite | R. Drabble | E. Ellison | B. Fallis | T. A. Gear (vice-captain) | B.G. Greinke | K.J. Grimley | K. Handley | R.E. Hughson | K.T. Hurley | L. D. Jewell | P.J. Kelly | K. Leach | A. McGill | N.B. McGuinness | D.J. Mclvor | Norm Reidy (captain and coach) | I. Richardson | A. Stewart | S. Thompson | G. Totton | R. Verdon

New South Wales
Lionel Byrnes | Phil Campbell | Jack Chester | Donald Clisby | Jerry Davidson | Jack Dean | Neil Dunn | Billy Free | Brian Groundwater | John Harding (vice-captain) | Doug Hoare | Neville Keating | Allan Kelly |Jack Kuschert | Peter Kuschert | Kev Little | Alf Penno (captain) | Noel Rickard | Brian Rontaunay | Keith Schow | Greg Schroder | Alison Terrell | Malcom Thomson | Brian Wells

== All-Australian team ==
In 1958 the All-Australian team was picked based on the Melbourne Carnival.

1958 All-Australian Team Melbourne Carnival
Name	State/League	Club
John Abley	South Australia	Port Adelaide
Donald Gale	Tasmania	Wynyard
Jim Ross	Tasmania	North Launceston
Stuart Spencer	Tasmania	Clarence
Barry Metcalfe	Victoria (VFA)	Mordialloc
Owen Abrahams	Victoria	Fitzroy
Allen Aylett	Victoria	North Melbourne
Ron Barassi	Victoria	Melbourne
Reg Burgess	Victoria	Essendon
Jack Clarke	Victoria	Essendon
Bob Davis	Victoria	Geelong (captain)
John Dugdale	Victoria	North Melbourne
Kevin Murray	Victoria	Fitzroy
Neil Roberts	Victoria	St Kilda
Ted Whitten	Victoria	Footscray
Jack Clarke	Western Australia	East Fremantle
Graham Farmer	Western Australia	East Perth
Alan Preen	Western Australia	East Fremantle
Norm Rogers	Western Australia	East Fremantle
Ray Sorrell	Western Australia	East Fremantle

== Tassie Medal ==
Both Allen Aylett and Ted Whitten polled seven votes but Aylett was awarded the medal after a countback. Whitten was declared joint winner retrospectively in 1995.
