= 1958 VFA season =

77th season of the Victorian Football Association

1958 VFA premiership season
- Teams: 16
- Premiers: Williamstown; 9th premiership
- Minor premiers: Williamstown; 7th minor premiership

The 1958 VFA season was the 77th season of the Victorian Football Association, an Australian rules football competition played in the state of Victoria.

The premiership was won by the Williamstown Football Club, after it defeated Moorabbin in the grand final replay on 4 October by 32 points. It was Williamstown's ninth premiership, drawing it level with Footscray for the most premierships won in VFA history, and it was the fourth of five premierships won in six seasons between 1954 and 1959.

== Association Membership ==
Map of VFA club locations, highlighting the expansion into the outer suburbs (1958–1966); teams shown with blue dots or arrows joined the Association during this period of expansion.
Note: the backdrop of this map is greater Melbourne ca. 2011; it includes roads and local government boundaries which did not exist until well after 1966

The 1958 season marked the beginning of the expansion of the Association from fourteen clubs to twenty clubs. The Association had been planning for a scheme to expand into the fastest developing outer suburbs since as early as 1946, when it was still playing under and trying to promote the throw-pass rules. This current plan was made public in 1956, when the Association announced its intention to expand to twenty teams, proposing a vision which focused on expansion further into the outer suburbs of greater Melbourne – Dandenong to the south-east, Heidelberg or Greensborough to the north-east, Sunshine to the west and Frankston to the south – as well as a proposed expansion into the regional markets of Ballarat and Bendigo.

Between 1958 and 1966, a total of seven new clubs – Dandenong, Frankston, Mordialloc, Sunshine, Waverley and Werribee from greater Melbourne and Geelong West from regional Victoria – joined the Association, as well as Caulfield (in the form of a merger with Brighton); and with the departure of Moorabbin in 1964, this brought the number of clubs to twenty.

In 1958, the first two new clubs of this expansion joined the Association to bring numbers to sixteen: Mordialloc and Dandenong, both switching from the Federal District League. Mordialloc announced in August 1957 that it had accepted the Association's invitation, and revealed that it had been approached to join at short notice for the 1957 season, but had declined. Dandenong voted to accept its invitation in September 1957, although only by a small 53–49 majority. The Federal District League, which was not consulted prior to the Association extending the invitations to its teams and had lost Moorabbin the same way in 1951, was unhappy with the "back-door methods" that the Association had taken.

Part of the Association's plans to expand to twenty clubs was the partitioning of the Association into two divisions of ten teams. The Association ultimately split into a first division and a second division with promotion and relegation between them from 1961; but, the other alternative considered attempted to reduce the travel burden between outlying suburbs by partitioning the Association into northern and southern divisions, with the winner of each division to contest the Association-wide premiership at the end of the season. To trial the geographic division structure, the clubs were divided into northern and southern sections in the 1958 fixture, and clubs were drawn to play other clubs in their own section twice and clubs from the other section only once; but, the final results were compiled into a single ladder and a single finals series.

The Camberwell Football Club, which was struggling due to poor support, had considered withdrawing from the Association prior to the start of the season, but decided to remain. Northcote and Brighton both operated as amateur clubs throughout the season, and Preston became amateur after June 11, abandoning its £4/10/– match payments.

== Premiership ==
The home-and-home season was played over only eighteen matches, a reduction from the twenty matches played in previous years. No matches were held for the two weekends of the Interstate Carnival, which was held in Melbourne. The top four clubs then contested a finals series under the Page–McIntyre system to determine the premiers for the season.

=== Ladder ===
1958 VFA ladder
Pos	Team	Pld	W	L	D	PF	PA	PP	Pts
1	Williamstown (P)	18	15	3	0	1563	1142	136.9	60
2	Moorabbin	18	13	3	2	1556	1036	150.2	56
3	Box Hill	18	13	5	0	1477	1045	141.3	52
4	Port Melbourne	18	13	5	0	1715	1221	140.5	52
5	Coburg	18	12	6	0	1567	1330	117.8	48
6	Sandringham	18	11	6	1	1483	1309	113.3	46
7	Yarraville	18	11	7	0	1543	1222	126.3	44
8	Brunswick	18	10	7	1	1346	1258	107.0	42
9	Camberwell	18	10	8	0	1350	1224	110.3	40
10	Mordialloc	18	8	9	1	1194	1317	90.7	34
11	Prahran	18	7	11	0	1301	1604	81.1	28
12	Preston	18	6	11	1	1354	1393	97.2	26
13	Oakleigh	18	5	13	0	1307	1469	89.0	20
14	Dandenong	18	3	15	0	1109	1733	64.0	12
15	Northcote	18	2	16	0	1011	1739	58.1	8
16	Brighton	18	2	16	0	1049	1883	55.7	8

Rules for classification: 1) points; 2) percentage; 3) number of points for.
(P) Premiers

=== Finals ===
	Semifinals
Saturday, 6 September	Box Hill 11.9 (75)	def. by	Port Melbourne 17.20 (122)	St Kilda Cricket Ground (crowd: 9,000)
Saturday, 13 September	Williamstown 8.21 (69)	def. by	Moorabbin 13.13 (91)	St Kilda Cricket Ground (crowd: 9,000)

	Preliminary Final
Saturday, 20 September	Williamstown 11.14 (80)	def.	Port Melbourne 8.10 (58)	St Kilda Cricket Ground (crowd: 8,400)

1958 VFA Grand Final
Saturday, 27 September	Moorabbin	drew with	Williamstown	St Kilda Cricket Ground (crowd: 20,000)
4.5 (29); 4.6 (30); 5.8 (38); 7.9 (51)	Q1; Q2; Q3; Final	0.1 (1); 3.5 (23); 4.9 (33); 6.15 (51)	Umpires: Rowe
Renwick 4, Moroney 2, Whalebone	Goals	Cullinan 2, Mazouris 2, Pelly, Reed
Ryan (ribs)	Injuries	Ward (ankle), Evans (jaw)
Moorabbin led for the entire match until Williamstown tied the scores with 30 seconds remaining

1958 VFA Grand Final replay
Saturday, 4 October	Moorabbin	def. by	Williamstown	St Kilda Cricket Ground (crowd: 22,000)
0.0 (0); 3.3 (21); 3.5 (23); 8.16 (64)	Q1; Q2; Q3; Final	3.12 (30); 5.14 (44); 12.18 (90); 13.18 (96)	Umpires: Rowe
Renwick 3, Crameri 2, Evans, Jones, P. Ryan	Goals	Cullinan 5, Mazouris 2, Pelly 2, B. Beitzel, Callahan, Murphy, Ramsay
Manie (toe), Moroney (ankle)	Injuries

== Awards ==
- The leading goalkicker for the home-and-home season for the third consecutive year was Bob Bonnett (Port Melbourne), who kicked 76 goals.
- The J. J. Liston Trophy was won by retiring amateur Keith Woolnough (Northcote), best known as the vice-captain of the VFL-VFA team in the demonstration match at the 1956 Summer Olympics. Woolnough polled 35 votes, to win ahead of Terry Devery (Box Hill), who was second with 29 votes, and John Martin (Williamstown), who was third with 27 votes.
- Coburg won the seconds premiership. Coburg 7.9 (51) defeated Moorabbin 5.13 (43) in the Grand Final, played as a curtain raiser to the firsts Grand Final on 27 September.

== Notable events ==
=== Interstate Carnival ===
The Association fielded its representative team in the 1958 Melbourne Carnival, competing in Section 1. The team was captained by Camberwell's Ken Ross.

The Association finished last with a record of 1–3 and a poorer percentage than South Australia; the Association's final match of the carnival was against the then-winless South Australia, but South Australia's large win was enough to consign the Association to last place. As a result, the Association was relegated directly to Section 2 for the following carnival.

Barry Metcalfe (Mordialloc) was named in the All-Australian team on the wing; he was the only Association player named in the team.

	1958 Melbourne Carnival
Wednesday, 2 July	Victoria (VFA) 15.12 (102)	def.	Tasmania 13.16 (94)	Melbourne Cricket Ground (crowd: 5,852)
Monday, 7 July (night)	Victoria (VFL) 13.23 (101)	def.	Victoria (VFA) 7.10 (52)	South Melbourne Cricket Ground (crowd: 7,200)
Wednesday, 9 July	Western Australia 21.16 (142)	def.	Victoria (VFA) 11.8 (74)	Melbourne Cricket Ground (crowd: 3,074)
Friday, 11 July (night)	South Australia 16.15 (111)	def.	Victoria (VFA) 5.13 (43)	South Melbourne Cricket Ground (crowd: 1,750)

=== Other notable events ===
- As had occurred in 1957, from the start of the season the match of the round was played on the preceding Wednesday night under floodlights at the South Melbourne Cricket Ground; but, the practice was abandoned after the match on 7 May was postponed due to inclement weather. The risk of worsening weather conditions in winter, disruptions to the clubs' training and social schedules, and poorer night crowds than had been seen in 1957 were the main reasons for abandoning the night matches. Night matches did not return in 1959.
- A grand final replay was held after the Grand Final between Moorabbin and Williamstown finished as a draw. The Association had not made contingency plans for the availability of the St Kilda Cricket Ground in the event of a replay being required, and the ground needed to be prepared for St Kilda's first district cricket match on 18 October, but the Victorian Cricket Association and Carlton Cricket Club agreed to move the match to Carlton to accommodate the replay.

== See also ==
- List of VFA/VFL premiers
