= Inglewood Football Club =

Inglewood

Names
- Full name: Inglewood Football Netball Club
- Nickname: Blues

Club details
- Founded: 1876
- Colours: Navy with White Vee
- Competition: Loddon Valley Football League
- Premierships: 1895, 1903, 1908, 1910, 1912, 1923, 1924, 1926, 1928, 1930, 1946, 1951, 1953, 1954, 1956, 1958, 1971, 1986
- Ground: Inglewood Community Sports Centre, Inglewood, Victoria

Other information
- Official website: Officialsite

Inglewood Football Club is an Australian rules football club based in Inglewood, Victoria. The club is currently affiliated with the Loddon Valley Football League.

== History ==
The first mention of football being played in Inglewood is in 1873, when 'the first football match of the season' was played by the Inglewood Cricket and Football Club. The first games were scratch matches between club members. Real interest began to be shown around 1876, when Inglewood played against Wedderburn in a 'grand' football match as part of an Inglewood Hospital fund raiser. Inglewood also played against Serpentine that year, as well as a team of Inglewood 'amateurs' labelling themselves 'the Bothumpians'.

In 1877 the club became a foundation member of the Victorian Football Association (VFA). The Melbourne Football Club visited Inglewood in 1877, playing a match against an Inglewood District team. A similar match was played against the Carlton Football Club in 1879.

In the 1880s and '90s, Inglewood continued playing against local teams, firstly in a competition called the North West Division, and then the Loddon Association, before becoming a foundation member of the Loddon Valley Football League in 1903, taking out the inaugural premiership.

The club then joined the newly formed Korong League in 1908. The club was dominant in the 1920s, playing in 8 grand finals for 5 premierships, under the leadership of Jack Brennan, a former VFL player with South Melbourne. Following Brennan's departure the club sought another high-profile coach, signing Edward 'Carji' Greeves in 1935. Greeves was a premiership player for Geelong and the first winner of the Brownlow Medal for the VFL's Fairest and Best Player.

Due to the depression and high travelling costs in 1936, Inglewood formed two teams, the 'Stars' and the 'Rovers', competing against Serpentine and Rheola in the Inglewood Football Association. By 1937, the club was back to one team in the Korong League, returning to the Loddon Valley Football League in 1938. The club was very strong between 1946 and 1958, taking out six premierships in that period.

The club's most recent premierships came in 1971 and 1986.

The club celebrated its 125th anniversary in 2001 with premiership reunions and the naming of a Team of the Century.

After reaching the preliminary final in 2003, the club fell upon hard times, enduring a 51-game losing streak. The drought was finally broken in Round 3, 2007. The fact the club survives today is testament to the hard working committee and loyal playing group that backed the club during that difficult period.

2016 saw the club celebrate 140 Years which included the naming of a netball 'All-Stars' team.

== Affiliated Competitions ==
1877 to 1879 - Victorian Football Association, North West Division

1880 to 1894 - No formal competition

1895 to 1902 - Dunolly Electorate/Loddon Association

1903 to 1907 - Loddon Valley Football League

1908 to 1935 - Korong District Central Association

1936 - Inglewood Football Association

1937 - Korong League

1938 to Present - Loddon Valley Football League

== Club colours ==
1877 - Blue Jersey, Red Cap, Blue Knicks, Blue and Red Striped Hose

1877 - 1908 - Blue and Red

1909 - 1922 - Blue and White vertical stripes

1923 - 1935 - Dark Blue

1936 - 'Stars' - Light Blue with white 'IFC' monogram, 'Rovers' - Yellow and Black

1937 - 1950 - Light Blue

1951 to 1975 - Royal Blue with White 'V'

1976 to 2013 - Navy Blue with White 'IFC' monogram

2013–Present - Navy Blue with White 'V'

== Home Grounds ==
1876 to 1892 - Inglewood Public Park (current Golf Course)

1893 to 1950 - Inglewood Recreation Reserve ('Old Rec', cnr Heales St and Morrow St)

1951 to Present - Inglewood Community Sports Centre (Grant St)

== Premierships ==
- Dunolly Electorate
  - 1895
- Loddon Valley Football Association
  - 1903
- Korong Central District League
  - 1908, 1910, 1912, 1923, 1924, 1926, 1928, 1930
- Loddon Valley Football League
  - 1946, 1951, 1953, 1954, 1956, 1958, 1971, 1986

== Notable players to have played for Inglewood include ==
- Jack Turpie (recruited to Fitzroy for the 1896 season)
- Percy Martyn (began career with Inglewood in 1909 and 1910 before joining St Kilda, then Richmond (won the club goal-kicking award in 1913) and Essendon. Percy returned to captain/coach Inglewood in 1939 and coached again in 1947)
- Norm McCamish (member of 1912 Premiership team, went on to captain Western Australia state team on 6 occasions)
- Horrie Pearce (ex St Kilda and Carlton player captained Inglewood in 1911).
- Chris Cameron (ex Carlton player played for Inglewood in 1911).
- Val Marchesi (played with Inglewood from 1914 to 1920 before being recruited by Geelong)
- Jack Brennan (ex South Melbourne player captain/coached 4 Inglewood premierships during the 1920s).
- Edward 'Carji' Greeves (former Geelong premiership player and inaugural Brownlow Medallist in 1924. Carji's family operated a stone-crushing works in Inglewood in the 1930s and Carji was appointed captain coach of Inglewood in 1935. Carji's father, Edward snr, had also played VFL football with Geelong at the tun of the century and was Inglewood's president in 1934).
- Bill Redmond (former Carlton player captain/coached Inglewood's 1958 premiership).

== Team of the Century ==
As part of the club's 125 Year Anniversary Celebrations in 2001, a poll of Inglewood residents was conducted by the Inglewood District Historical Society to determine an Inglewood Football Team of the Century. Players were selected by number of nominations, with no regards to field positions.

Ralph Medcalf, Windsor Rochester, Charlie Catto, Eddie Harrison, Malcolm Johns, Kelvin Dows, Edward 'Carji' Greeves, Norm Hancock, Alec Medcalf, George Vanston, David Cossar, Graham Roberts, Jim Summers, Lindsay Kelly, Ralph Conboy, Ian Drill, Harry Lamprell, Percy Martyn, Ted Bradley, Brian Dowling, Peter Larson, Orm Renshaw, Jim 'Noey' Watts, Darrell Billett, Tim Birthisel, Jack Brennan, Bill Lamprell, Ian Triplett

== Books ==
- Muddy boots : Inglewood Football Club from the goldfields era to 1980 / Allan M. Nixon. ISBN 0867730005
- Bothumpian Blues : 140 Years of the Inglewood Football Netball Club / David Rose.

ISBN 9780994344137
