= Maiden Gully =

- Suburb
- Interactive map of Maiden Gully
- Coordinates: 36.743°S 144.209°E
- Country: Australia
- State: Victoria
- City: Bendigo
- LGA: City of Greater Bendigo
- Location: 7 km (4.3 mi) W of Bendigo

Government
  - State electorate: Bendigo West
  - Federal division: Bendigo

Population
  - Total: 5,407 (2021 census)
- Postcode: 3551
Suburbs around Maiden Gully
Myers Flat	Myers Flat	Eaglehawk
Marong	Maiden Gully	East Bendigo
Lockwood	Lockwood	Kangaroo Flat

Maiden Gully is a suburb of the regional city of Bendigo in central Victoria, Australia, located 7 kilometres (4.3 mi) west of the central business district along Calder Highway. At the 2021 census, Maiden Gully had a population of 5,407.

Maiden Gully is surrounded by the Bendigo suburbs of Kangaroo Flat, Eaglehawk, California Gully, Long Gully, West Bendigo, Golden Square and the outer-rural suburbs of Lockwood, Marong and Myers Flat.

Maiden Gully has experienced enormous growth in recent years, with growth mainly centred to the north of the Calder Highway in the Robin Hill Estate, and to the Southwest of the Calder Highway. In addition to this, there remains a small pocket of semi-rural acreages to the west of Monsants Road.

Maiden Gully has an Australian rules football and netball club called Maiden Gully YCW Football Netball Club currently competing in the Loddon Valley Football Netball League and the Bendigo Junior Football League (BJFL).

'Maiden Gully Village' was officially opened on July 1st, 2026 and features a Coles Supermarket, Liqourland, Bakers Delight, Subway, smaller stores and local businesses.
