= Paul Dodd =

Paul Dodd may refer to:

- Paul Dodd (mayor), mayor of Galway, 1656–1657
- Paul Dodd (footballer) (born 1937), Australian rules footballer
- Paul A. Dodd (1902–1992), American educator, economist, and labor arbitrator
