= Barry Metcalfe =

Australian rules footballer

Personal information
- Full name: Barry Stanley Metcalfe
- Born: 28 September 1935
- Died: 3 April 1980 (aged 44)
- Original team: East Malvern Amateurs
- Height: 175 cm (5 ft 9 in)
- Weight: 72 kg (159 lb)
- Position: Wingman

Playing career
| Years | Club | Games (Goals) |
| 1957 | Hawthorn | 1 (0) |
| 1958 | Mordialloc | 13 (6) |
| 1960–62 | Claremont | 55 (10) |

Barry Stanley Metcalfe (28 September 1935 – 3 April 1980) was an Australian rules footballer who played a game with Hawthorn in the VFL and spent the early 1960s at Claremont.

Metcalfe, who was used mainly as a wingman, played his first and only game for Hawthorn in the club's 1957 away game against Carlton at Princes Park. One of four Hawthorn players to debut that day, Metcalfe was on the bench and did not take to the field. When teammate Len Crane was appointed captain-coach of VFA club Mordialloc in 1958, Metcalfe joined him for the season. He represented the Association at the 1958 Melbourne Carnival and he was selected to the All-Australian team.

After not playing top level Australian rules football in 1959 he moved to Western Australia and signed up with Claremont where he would make 55 senior appearances, playing three games for the Western Australian interstate team, being in the squad at the 1961 Brisbane Carnival.
