= Jack Gale =

Australian rules footballer (1899–1975)

Personal information
- Full name: John Henry Gale
- Born: 28 August 1899; Burnie, Tasmania
- Died: 5 April 1975 (aged 75); Burnie, Tasmania
- Original team: Yeoman (Tas)
- Height: 173 cm (5 ft 8 in)
- Weight: 80 kg (176 lb)

Playing career^{1}
Years	Club	Games (Goals)
1924	Richmond	3 (0)
- ^{1} Playing statistics correct to the end of 1924.

Jack Gale (28 August 1899 – 5 April 1975) was an Australian rules footballer who played three games in the VFL for Richmond Football Club in 1924.

He returned to Tasmania and was Captain/Coach of the Wynyard Football Club from 1927 and 1928. After retiring as a player he then became an umpire in the NWFU.

Gale's son, Don, was a champion Tasmanian footballer who became the first player from the NWFU to achieve All Australian selection, whilst two of his grandsons, Michael and Brendon, had lengthy AFL careers throughout the 1990s, both also playing at Richmond.
