= Tom Crane (footballer) =

Australian rules footballer

Personal information
- Born: 21 December 1921
- Died: 20 May 2010 (aged 88)
- Height: 185 cm (6 ft 1 in)
- Weight: 78 kg (172 lb)

Playing career^{1}
Years	Club	Games (Goals)
1942–1945	South Melbourne	7 (1)
1945	North Melbourne	1 (0)
Total		8 (1)
- ^{1} Playing statistics correct to the end of 1945.

Tom Crane (21 December 1921 – 20 May 2010) was an Australian rules footballer who played with South Melbourne and North Melbourne in the Victorian Football League (VFL).

Crane, a defender, was never a regular fixture in the South Melbourne team, playing just seven games in four seasons at the club. He crossed to North Melbourne during the 1945 VFL season, where his brother Jack played. Another brother, Len, was a South Melbourne and Hawthorn footballer.

He joined Northcote in 1946.
