= Marist Regional College =

Coordinates: 41.0483°S 145.8926°E

- Burnie, Tasmania; Australia

Information
- Type: Independent, co-educational, day school
- Motto: Love the Truth
- Denomination: Roman Catholic, Marist Fathers
- Established: 1972
- Chairperson: Mr Ben Sandow
- Principal: Mr Shayne Kidd
- Enrolment: ~900 (7–12)
- Colours: Navy blue, sky blue and white
- Slogan: Striving for Excellence, learning for life
- Affiliation: Sports Association of Tasmanian Independent Schools
- Website: www.mrc.tas.edu.au

Marist Regional College is a Roman Catholic, co-educational, secondary school, located in Parklands, a suburb of Burnie, Tasmania, Australia.

Marist Regional College is part of the Marist Schools Australia network of Catholic high schools across Australia, and is one of several within Australia and around the world that share the same name of "Marist" College. The college currently caters for around 960 students from Years 7 to 12.

== History ==
Marist Regional College was established in 1972 through the amalgamation of Stella Maris Regional College, run by the Sisters of Mercy, and Marist College, run by the Marist Fathers.

=== Marist College ===
The Society of Mary (Marists) opened the College in 1959 as a boys’ secondary boarding school, initially known as St James' Marist College, and attracted an initial enrolment of 90. From 1966 onwards, the School had some co-ed classes with Stella Maris Regional Girls' College.

=== Stella Maris Regional Girls' College ===
In 1965, construction of the new Stella Maris Regional Girls' College began on land next to Marist College. In 1966, co-educational classes commenced with a small number of girls attending Marist College for lessons.

=== Marist Regional College ===
Marist College and Stella Maris Regional College were merged in 1972 to form Marist Regional College. From this time the College has offered co-educational schooling from Year 7 to Year 12. Marist Regional College opened with 555 students; 405 boys (an all-time high), and 150 girls. Boarder numbers (boys only) were 130. At the end of 1975, the boarding house was closed. With the amalgamation came the new College crest. From Stella Maris Regional College came the star; symbol of Mary, the Patroness. From Marist College came the monogram A.M.; monogram of Mary, from whose name was derived the name “Marist”. The College motto is "Love the Truth”.

Today, Marist Regional College is led by a lay Principal, and retains an emphasis on religious education. The school is managed by lay staff.

The Marist Regional College senior year levels and staff advise the principal on the selection of 20 student leaders who represent the student body during their last year at MRC. They are known as the Student Representative Council (SRC).

== Campus ==
Marist, as the college is colloquially known, is situated less than 1 km from Burnie Park, in Parklands. The school has views over the sports grounds, which continue with views of Bass Strait. It is close to Stella Maris Primary School and Burnie Primary School, with several other schools, including Hellyer College, Parklands High School, and Burnie High School also located in the City of Burnie.

== Sport ==
Marist Regional College is a member of the Sports Association of Tasmanian Independent Schools (SATIS). The college currently has an Athletics Carnival, Swimming Carnival and Cross Country Carnival. Students represent Houses known as McAuley, Chanel, Colin and Frayne, named after significant figures in the founding histories of the Mercy Sisters and Marist Fathers. These houses were previously known as Bass, Flinders, Tasman and Cook, after significant explorers in Australia's history.

=== SATIS premierships ===
Marist Regional College has won the following SATIS premierships.

Combined:

- Swimming (2) – 1995, 1996

Boys:

- Basketball – 2015
- Cricket (2) – 1978, 1979
- Football (3) – 1966, 1975, 1976
- Hockey – 2021
- Swimming – 1996
- Tennis (8) – 1984, 1985, 1986, 1988, 1989, 1994, 2012, 2013

Girls:

- Basketball (5) – 2011, 2015, 2019, 2020, 2021
- Football – 2021
- Hockey (2) – 2014, 2020
- Netball (4) – 1987, 1989, 1993, 2007
- Soccer – 2010
- Tennis (3) – 2016, 2017, 2018

== Notable alumni ==
- Taran Armstrong – professional basketball player for Dubai Basketball
- Marty Clarke – former professional basketball player and coach
- Anita Dow – Member (Labor) for Braddon, former Deputy Leader of the Opposition of Tasmania
- Jonathon Duniam – Senator (Liberal) for Tasmania; Manager of Opposition Business in the Australian Senate
- Martin Flanagan – Journalist and author
- Robbie Fox – AFL footballer for the Sydney Swans
- Brendon Gale – CEO of the Tasmania Football Club and former CEO of the AFL Players' Association; former AFL footballer for the Richmond Tigers
- Michael Gale – Former AFL footballer for the Richmond Tigers and Fitzroy Lions
- Ryan Gardner – AFL footballer for the Western Bulldogs
- David Guest – Member of the Australia national field hockey team; bronze medallist at the 2008 Beijing Olympics
- Emma Humphries – AFLW footballer for the West Coast Eagles, formerly for Melbourne and North Melbourne
- Meagan Kiely – AFLW footballer for the Richmond Tigers
- Brody Mihocek – AFL footballer for the Collingwood Magpies
- Rod Oborne – Former VFL footballer for Collingwood and Richmond
- Stephen Parry – Former Government Whip in the Australian Senate; former Senator (Liberal) for Tasmania
- Luke Russell – Former AFL footballer for the Gold Coast Suns
- Maverick Weller – Former AFL footballer for Gold Coast, St Kilda, and Richmond Football Clubs
- Lachie Weller – AFL footballer for the Gold Coast Suns

== Sexual abuse cases ==
In 1999, former international cricket umpire Stephen Randall was convicted of 15 charges of indecent assault, against nine girls while teaching at Marist Regional College in 1981 and 1982. In 2004, former Marist Regional College priest trainee Paul Ronald Goldsmith was arrested for sexually abusing 20 teenage boys when he was coaching athletics at the school from 1974 to 2000 and for also making his victims play strip poker. He served six-and-a-half years in prison and later died in 2016. In 2007, Gregory Ferguson was sentenced to two years jail (eligible for parole after 12 months) for offences in 1971 against two boys aged 13 at Marist College. On 13 December 2007, he was sentenced to an additional three years jail for offences against a third boy. In 2008, a jury found former priest Roger Michael Bellemore guilty on three counts of maintaining a sexual relationship with a young person under the age of 17 years in the 1960s and 1970s while he was at the same college. By December 2018, six priests who taught at the College had been convicted of committing acts of sexual abuse.

== See also ==
- List of schools in Tasmania
- Catholic education in Australia
