= Lakeside Stadium =

Australian sports arena

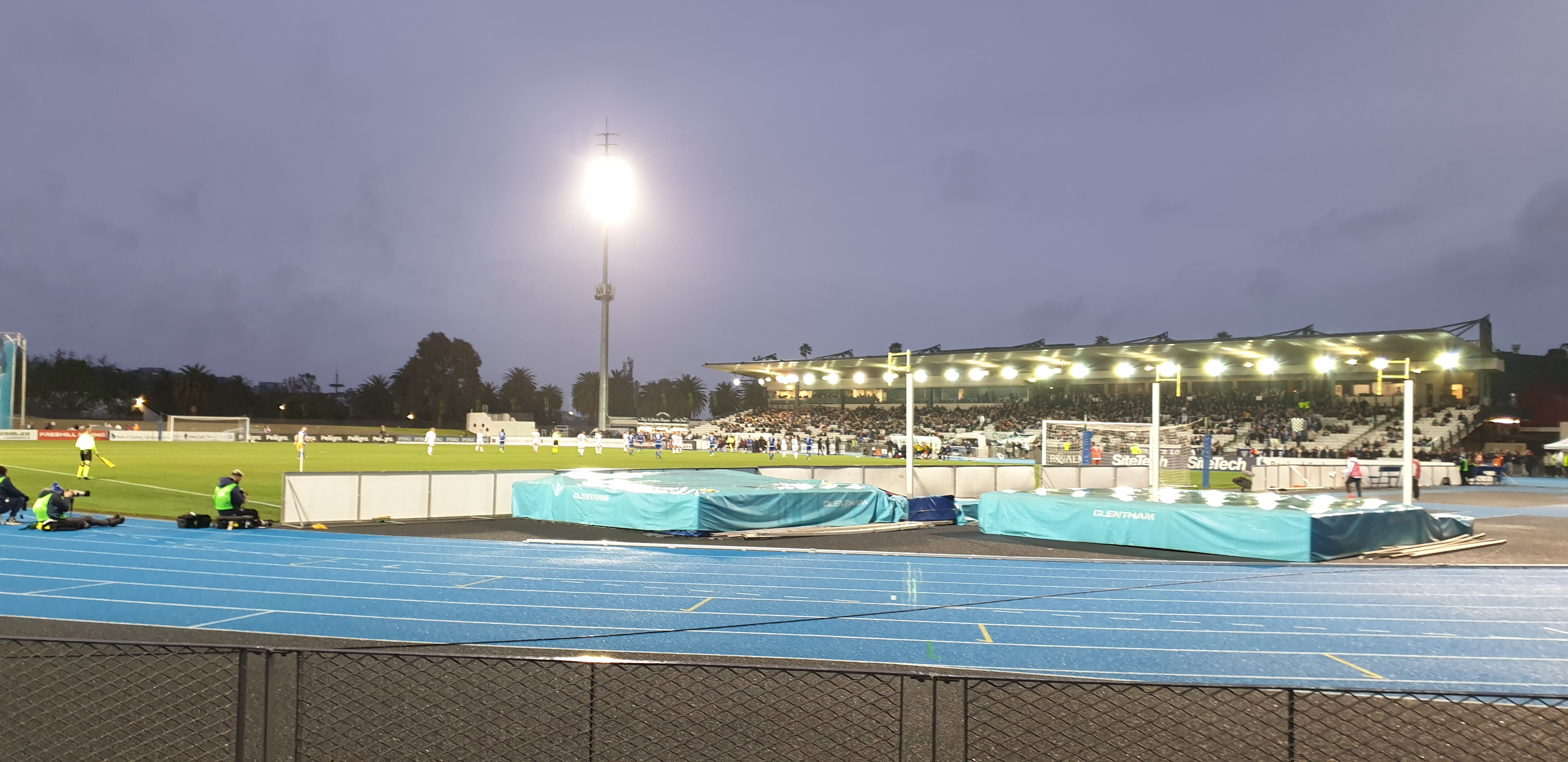
- Interactive map of Lakeside Stadium
- Former names: Lake Oval, South Melbourne Cricket Ground, Bob Jane Stadium
- Location: Aughtie Drive, Albert Park, Victoria
- Coordinates: 37°50′25″S 144°57′54″E
- Operator: State Sports Centre Trust
- Capacity: 12,000 (7,400 seated)
- Surface: Grass
- Public transit: ■ Albert Rd/Clarendon St ● ● ● Anzac

Construction
- Groundbreaking: 1876
- Opened: 1878
- Renovated: 1995, 2011, 2019

Tenants
- South Melbourne FC; Melbourne Victory Women (2008–2020); Albert-park Football Club (1878–1879); South Melbourne Football Club (1880–1941, 1947–1981)

Ground information

International information
- Only women's ODI: 31 January 1985: Australia v England
- As of 8 September 2020; Source: CricketArchive

Lakeside Stadium is an Australian sports arena in the South Melbourne suburb of Albert Park. Comprising an athletics track and soccer stadium, it currently serves as the home ground and administrative base for association football club South Melbourne FC, Athletics Victoria, Athletics Australia, Victorian Institute of Sport and Australian Little Athletics.

The venue was built on the site of a former Australian rules football and cricket ground, the Lakeside Oval (also called the Lake Oval and the South Melbourne Cricket Ground), which served for more than a century as the home ground of the South Melbourne Cricket Club, and most notably as the home ground of the South Melbourne Football Club from 1880 to 1981, excluding a period from 1942 to 1946 when it was occupied by military during World War II, though Australian rules football had been played at the Albert Park end of the site from 1869 to 1879. The ground has also been used for soccer from at least 1883. It is one of four sporting facilities in Melbourne under the banner of Melbourne Sports Centres – the others being the Melbourne Sports and Aquatic Centre (MSAC), the MSAC Institute of Training (MIT) and the State Netball and Hockey Centre (SNHC).

== History ==
=== Cricket ===
The South Melbourne Cricket Club was formed in 1862 and used the oval as its home until 1994.

=== Australian rules football ===
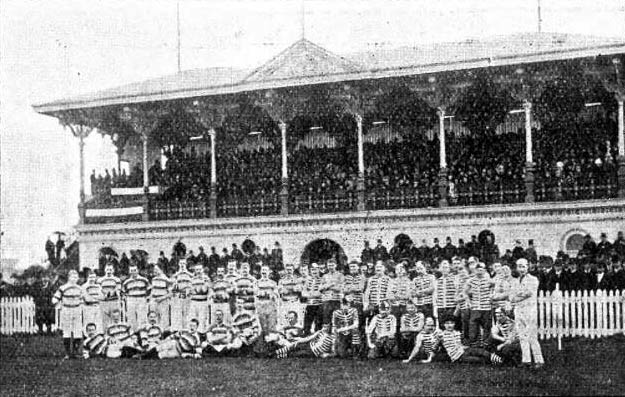
South Melbourne and the touring British Lions in front of the grandstand at the South Melbourne Cricket Ground in 1888. South Melbourne won 7 goals to 3.

What came to be known as the Lake Oval or Lakeside Oval was most prominently known for Australian rules football, being the home ground for the South Melbourne Football Club (founded in 1874) in both the Victorian Football Association and the Victorian Football League.

With the formation of Albert Park from a low lying swamp, a growing population and the popularity of football in the 1870s, an oval was established at the South Melbourne end of the park by the late 1870s: the Albert-park Football Club (founded in 1867) played four games there in 1878 and 1879. In 1880, the South Melbourne and Albert-park clubs merged under the South Melbourne banner, and the merged club played its games at the South Melbourne end of the park. In 1887, an elaborate new grandstand was constructed: it opened in time to host a Tasmania vs Essendon match, which held a capacity crowd of 10,000 spectators.

In its early days, the ground was considered one of the best in the league, and was the venue for the 1901 VFL Grand Final. Following the destruction of the previous grandstand by fire, a new grandstand was built in 1926 designed by Clegg & Morrow and featuring a non-symmetrical layout, ornamental gables and prominent vents in the form of ridge lanterns.

When electric floodlighting was installed at the venue during the 1950s, it became one of the first venues in Melbourne to regularly host night football matches, including the night premiership series between 1956 and 1971. Night premiership matches in the Victorian Football Association in 1957 and 1958 and night interstate matches, including many matches at the 1958 Interstate Carnival were also held at the Lake Oval. The ground record crowd for Lake Oval was set on 30 July 1932, when 41,000 turned out to see Carlton defeat South Melbourne by nine points.

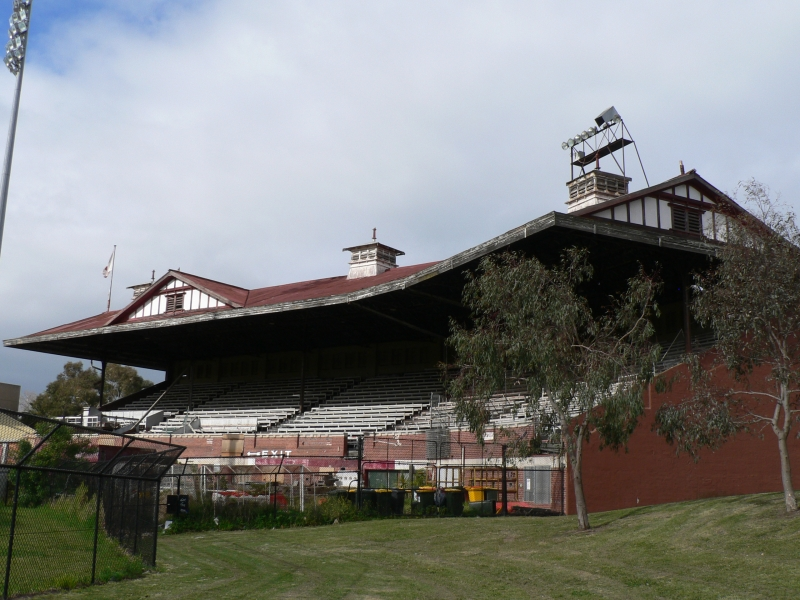
The 1926 grandstand prior to Lakeside Stadium redevelopment

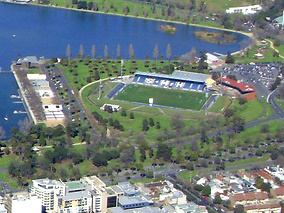
Aerial view of Lakeside Stadium prior to 2011 redevelopment

South Melbourne used the ground for home games until the end of the 1981 VFL season, when the club relocated to Sydney and became the Sydney Swans. The last senior VFL match played at Lake Oval was on Saturday, 29 August 1981, when South Melbourne were defeated by 33 points by North Melbourne in front of 8,484 fans. The ground hosted 888 senior matches in the recognized top level of Victorian football – 184 in the VFA and 704 in the VFL/AFL – in 98 seasons of competition.

A further 32 matches were played at the Albert-park end of the park between 1870 and 1879: 10 matches in the unaffiliated era were played at the lower end of Clarendon Street between 1870 and 1872, with 14 matches in the unaffiliated era and eight matches in the VFA being played at the other end of Clarendon Street between 1873 and 1879. The Lake Oval was used for VFL/AFL reserves matches after South Melbourne's relocation until 1993.

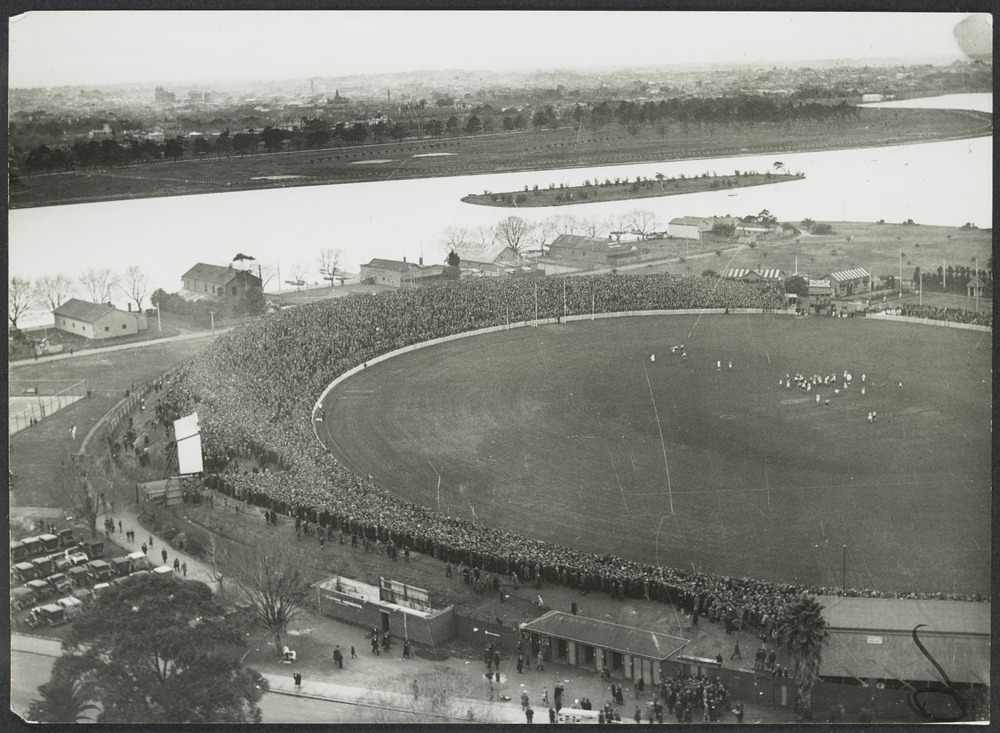
Aerial photo of the South Melbourne cricket ground with an Australian Rules Football match in progress.

For a time during the late 1980s and early 1990s, the struggling Fitzroy Football Club used the ground as a training and administrative base. The final Australian rules football tenant at the ground was the Old Xaverians Football Club of the Victorian Amateur Football Association, who were based there in 1993 and 1994.

=== Redevelopment and transformation into a soccer stadium ===
Redevelopment of the venue from an oval football/cricket stadium to the rectangular soccer stadium which became known as the Lakeside Stadium took place in 1995, when South Melbourne FC was forced out of its old home at Middle Park. The stadium was built with a capacity of 14,000 people, which was achieved or approached several times in South Melbourne's history at the ground. A grandstand with an approximate capacity of 3,000 people was situated on one side, with a social club, reception centre and administrative facilities built in, while the other three sides of the ground consisted of open terraces with wooden seats. At one stage, a second two tiered stand for the outer side was proposed, but only preliminary plans were produced. As well as being the home of South Melbourne FC, the venue also hosted games by the Socceroos, Young Socceroos, Australia's national women's team the Matildas, and grand finals and finals matches of the Victorian Premier League (now National Premier Leagues Victoria). The old grandstand remained unused and decaying in this period; at one stage the Sydney Swans showed interest in repurchasing it to be used as a museum and administrative building, while there were also calls from others to demolish the building because of its derelict state.

=== Athletics venue ===
In 2010–11, the stadium underwent a major redevelopment, in order to accommodate an athletics track, as part of moving Athletics Victoria from Olympic Park, such that the Victorian Institute of Sport, Athletics Victoria and South Melbourne FC would share tenancy of the venue. Major Projects Victoria committed $60 million to the project. South Melbourne played its final match under Lakeside Stadium's previous configuration in April 2010, and construction work on the remodelled venue began in June 2010. Under the remodelling, the old grandstand stand was refurbished to house the VIS. The synthetic 8-lane athletics track was constructed to international IAAF standards. A 6-lane 60 metre warm-up track was also constructed. The remodelling also saw a FIFA-sized natural grass soccer pitch, a new electronic scoreboard, upgraded lighting, a new northern stand and new spectator amenities. The old grandstand was also renovated to accommodate offices. In March 2012, the stadium hosted the Melbourne Track Classic.

Despite often providing windy conditions for athletes, some world class performances have been recorded at the venue, including a 12.49 second run by Sally Pearson over the 100m hurdles. The venue is operated by the State Sports Centre Trust, the operators of the Melbourne Sports and Aquatic Centre and the State Netball and Hockey Centre.

=== Peter Norman statue ===
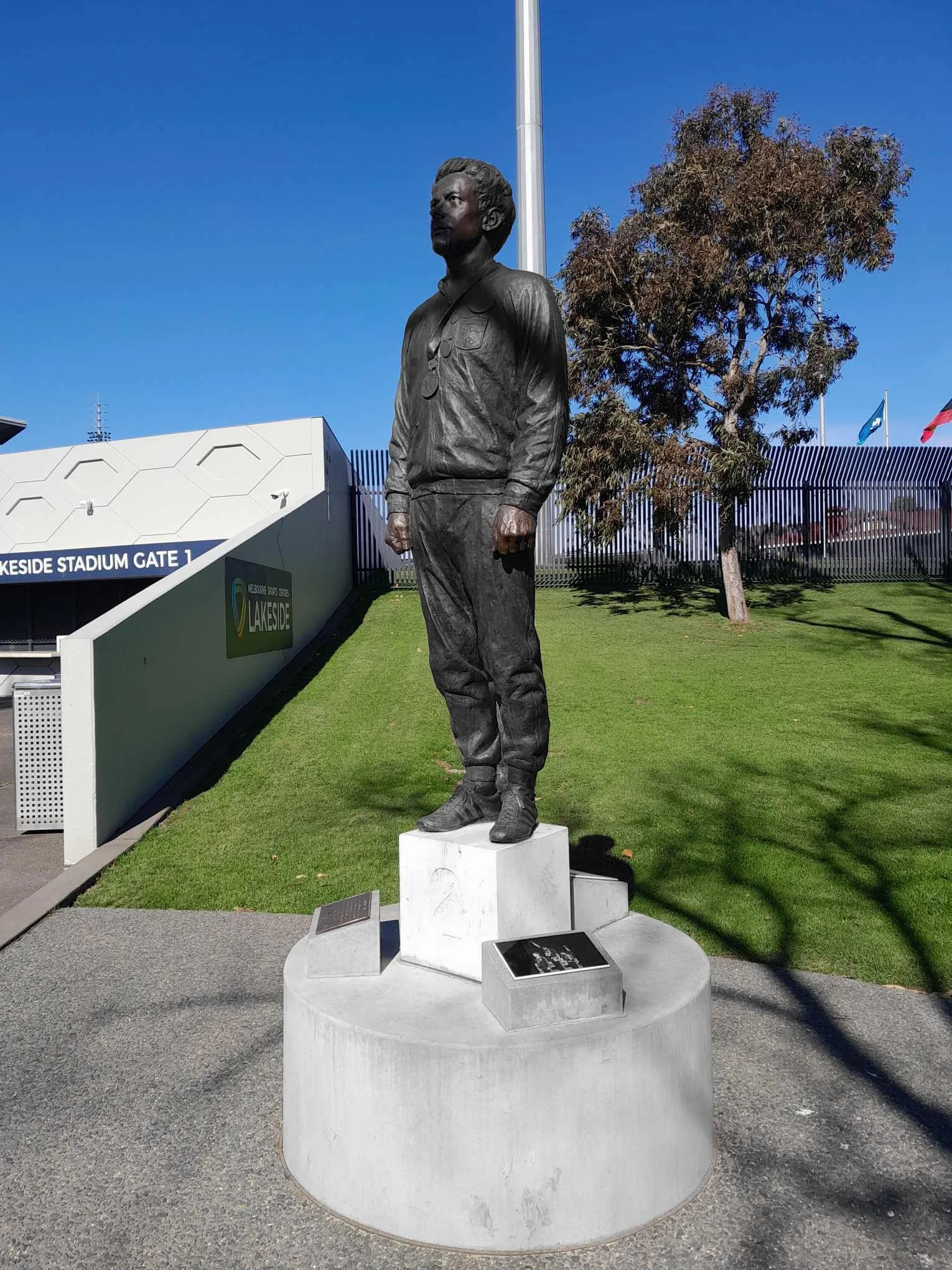
Statue of Peter Norman next to the stadium.

In 2019, a statue of Peter Norman was unveiled next to the stadium as a tribute to his solidarity during the 1968 Olympics Black Power salute.

== See also ==
- List of Australian rules football statues
