= Bears Lagoon Serpentine Football Club =

Bears Lagoon Serpentine

Names
- Full name: Bears Lagoon Serpentine Football & Netball Club
- Nickname(s): Bears

Club details
- Founded: 1945; 80 years ago
- Colours: Indigo Gold
- Competition: LVFL
- Premierships: LVFL (12) 1947, 1948, 1949, 1960, 1961, 1965, 1966, 1982, 1983, 1992, 1994, 1995
- Ground(s): Serpentine Recreation Reserve, Serpentine

Other information
- Official website: BLSFNC

The Bears Lagoon Serpentine Football Club is an Australian Rules Football club which competes in the LVFL in Victoria, Australia.

The club, known as the Bears Lagoon Serpentine Bears, represents the localities of Bears Lagoon and Serpentine and has participated in the LVFL since 1945.

The Bears have appeared in many grand finals, winning twelve; the most recent in 1995.

== Location ==
BLS in Loddon
Location of BLS (Victoria)

== History ==
=== Success (1945 - 1995) ===
BLS has won twelve premierships in the LVFL and is the third most successful team in the league by premierships however hasn't has success since 1995. The team also finished as wooden spooners at the end of the 2016 season.

== Rivalries ==
Because of the small sized football league rivalries are few and far between and most teams aren't overly aggressive towards each other, however BLS's main rivals are Bridgewater, Newbridge & Pyramid Hill.

== Honours ==
Premierships

Year	Winner	Score	Runner-up	Score
1947	Bears Lagoon Serpentine	3.9.27	Bridgewater	3.8.26
1948	Bears Lagoon Serpentine	12.7.79	Inglewood	9.17.71
1949	Bears Lagoon Serpentine	2.6.18	Bridgewater	2.3.15
1960	Bears Lagoon Serpentine	3.4.22	Mitiamo	2.7.19
1961	Bears Lagoon Serpentine	7.8.50	Bridgewater	5.12.42
1965	Bears Lagoon Serpentine	8.10.58	Inglewood	5.5.35
1966	Bears Lagoon Serpentine	10.5.65	Mitiamo	7.6.48
1982	Bears Lagoon Serpentine	11.13.79	Bridgewater	12.6.78
1983	Bears Lagoon Serpentine	18.17.125	Bridgewater	14.17.101
1992	Bears Lagoon Serpentine	11.12.78	Newbridge	6.6.42
1994	Bears Lagoon Serpentine	21.15.141	YCW	12.11.83
1995	Bears Lagoon Serpentine	14.5.89	Mitiamo	12.13.85
