= Don Gale =

Australian rules footballer

Donald 'Don' Wilfred Gale (20 February 1935 – 22 August 2002) was an Australian rules football player who played for Wynyard and Burnie in the NWFU and Hobart in the TFL. He was selected in regional and state representative teams.

== Wynyard ==
Gale began his senior career with Wynyard in 1953, debuting against Penguin on 18 April 1953. He performed so well in his first season that he finished fourth in the club best and fairest award.

== Unable to move to VFL ==
He was signed by South Melbourne at the end of the 1954 season, but over the next couple of years was unable to obtain a clearance.

== Hobart and back to Wynyard ==
Gale played with Hobart in 1957, but then returned to Wynyard in 1958. At the Melbourne Centenary Carnival that year, Gale achieved All Australian selection, becoming the first player from the NWFU to do so.

== Burnie ==
Don Gale was captain-coach of Burnie for the 1961 and 1962 seasons, leading his team to the premiership in the latter year. He then announced his retirement at the age of 27.

== Family connections to football ==
His father, Jack Gale, played three games for the Richmond Football Club in the VFL in 1924 and his two sons, Michael Gale and Brendon Gale, had lengthy AFL careers throughout the 1990s.
