= Maiden Gully YCW Football Netball Club =

Maiden Gully YCW

Names
- Full name: Maiden Gully YCW Football Netball Club (2017 - Present)
- Former name: YCW Football Club (Bendigo) (1945 - 2016)
- Nickname: "The Eagles"

Club details
- Founded: 1945; 81 years ago
- Colours: Orange White Blue
- Competition: Loddon Valley Football Netball League
- Premierships: Senior Premierships (12) 1947, 1949, 1951, 1954, 1959, 1961, 1970, 1982, 1987, 1997, 2001, 2002 Senior Runner-Up (10) 1948, 1956, 1964, 1971, 1973, 1994, 1996, 1998, 1999, 2000
- Ground: Marist College, Maiden Gully
- Former ground: Backhaus Oval Reserve, Golden Square

The Maiden Gully YCW Football Netball Club, nicknamed the Eagles, is an Australian rules football and netball club and located in Maiden Gully, a suburb of the regional city of Bendigo in central Victoria, Australia, located approximately 7 kilometres (4.3 mi) west of the central business district along Calder Highway, and is affiliated with the Loddon Valley Football Netball.

== History ==
YCW Football Club (Bendigo) was established in 1945, winning their first senior football premiership in 1947 in the now defunct Bendigo Football Association. YCW also won senior football premierships in 1949, 1951, 1954 & 1959.

After joining the Golden City Football League in 1960, they played in this competition until 1980 winning senior football premierships in 1961 & 1970.

1981 saw the Golden City Football League become incorporated into the Bendigo Football League, initially causing a name change to the Bendigo-Golden City FL. The Bendigo-Golden City FL consisted of two divisions, with YCW competing in Division 2 and winning the premiership in 1982.

In 1983, the League was reverted back to a single division competition and was renamed the Bendigo Football League.

YCW Football Club then went into recess for the 1984 season before joining the Loddon Valley Football League for the 1985 season. YCW won senior football premierships in the LVFNL in 1987, 1997, 2001, 2002. The senior football team played in 7 Grand Final in a row from 1996 to 2002.

The start of the 2017 season saw the YCW Football Club merge with the Maiden Gully Lions Junior Football Club to become the Maiden Gully YCW Football Netball Club (known as the "Eagles") with teams playing across the Loddon Valley Football Netball League (LVFNL) and the Bendigo Junior Football League (BJFL).

== Competition Timeline ==
as: YCW Football Club (Bendigo)

- Bendigo Football Association: 1946 to 1959
- Golden City Football League: 1960 to 1980
- Bendigo - Golden City Football League (Div 2): 1981 to 1982
- Bendigo Football League: 1983
- Recess: 1984
- Loddon Valley Football League: 1985 to 2016

as: Maiden Gully YCW Football Netball Club

- Loddon Valley Football League: 2017 to Present

== Senior Football Premierships (12) ==
Bendigo Football Association: 1946 to 1959

Year	Premiers	Score		Runner-Up	Score
1947	YCW	18.14 - 122	vs	Huntly	08.07 - 55
1949	YCW	16.16 - 112	vs	Northern United	09.12 - 66
1951	YCW	11.14 - 80	vs	White Hills	11.01 - 67
1954	YCW	08.10 - 58	vs	Kennington	07.10 - 52
1959	YCW	11.11 - 77	vs	Chewton	10.10 - 70

Golden City Football League: 1960 to 1980

Year	Premiers	Score		Runner-Up	Score
1961	YCW	18.07 - 115	vs	Harcourt	09.12 - 66
1970	YCW	12.13 - 85	vs	Northern United	10.13 - 73

Bendigo - Golden City Football League (Div 2): 1981 to 1982

Year	Premiers	Score		Runner-Up	Score
1982	YCW	15.14 - 104	vs	North Bendigo	13.21 - 99

Loddon Valley Football Netball League: 1985 to Present

Year	Premiers	Score		Runner-Up	Score
1987	YCW	19.15 - 129	vs	Inglewood	16.05 - 101
1997	YCW	17.13 - 115	vs	Calivil United	08.07 - 55
2001	YCW	12.16 - 88	vs	Newbridge	09.10 - 64
2002	YCW	09.13 - 67	vs	Calivil United	04.05 - 29

== Senior Football Runner-Up (10) ==
Bendigo Football Association: 1946 to 1959

Year	Premiers	Score		Runner-Up	Score
1948	Kangaroo Flat	12.12 - 84	vs	YCW	08.10 - 58
1956	Kennington	09.07 - 61	vs	YCW	06.08 - 44

Golden City Football League: 1960 to 1980

Year	Premiers	Score		Runner-Up	Score
1964	Provincial	06.17 - 53	vs	YCW	06.13 - 49
1971	White Hills	12.07 - 79	vs	YCW	10.14 - 74
1973	Northern United	15.12 - 102	vs	YCW	09.19 - 73

Loddon Valley Football Netball League: 1985 to Present

Year	Premiers	Score		Runner-Up	Score
1994	Bears Lagoon - Serpentine	21.15 - 141	vs	YCW	12.11 - 83
1996	Calivil	12.08 - 80	vs	YCW	06.17 - 53
1998	Calivil United	07.10 - 52	vs	YCW	06.09 - 45
1999	Mitiamo	14.05 - 89	vs	YCW	11.09 - 75
2000	Newbridge	15.07 - 97	vs	YCW	11.10 - 76

== Reserves Football Premierships (7) ==
Loddon Valley Football Netball League: 1985 to Present

- YCW - 1986, 1990, 1991, 1995, 1997, 2002, 2004

== Thirds Football Premierships (7) ==
Loddon Valley Football Netball League: 1985 to Present

- YCW - 1985, 1993, 1994, 2005, 2012, 2016,
- Maiden Gully YCW - 2025

== Under 15's / 16's Football Premierships (2) ==
Bendigo Junior Football League: 1958 to Present

- YCW - 2016 (U16 R2)
- Maiden Gully YCW - 2025 (U16 R1)

== Under 13's / 14's Football Premierships (4) ==
Bendigo Junior Football League: 1964 to Present

- Maiden Gully Lions - 2014 (U14 R2)
- Maiden Gully YCW - 2019 (U14 R2), 2022 (U14 R2), 2023 (U14 R3),

== Under 12's Football Premierships (3) ==
Bendigo Junior Football League: 1971 to Present

- Maiden Gully Lions - 2015 (U12D)
- Maiden Gully YCW - 2024 (U12C), 2025 (U12A)

== A-Grade Netball Premierships (11) ==
Loddon Valley Football Netball League: 1985 to Present

- YCW - 1986, 1988, 1989, 1990, 2000, 2001, 2008, 2009, 2010, 2013,
- Maiden Gully YCW - 2023

== B-Grade Netball Premierships (11) ==
Loddon Valley Football Netball League: 1985 to Present

- YCW - 1988, 1989, 1990, 2000, 2002, 2006, 2008, 2011, 2012, 2013, 2014

== C-Grade Netball Premierships (13) ==
Loddon Valley Football Netball League: 1985 to Present

- YCW - 1987, 1998, 1999, 2000, 2001, 2003, 2004, 2005, 2006, 2011
- Maiden Gully YCW - 2019, 2022, 2023

== C-Reserve Netball Premierships (2) ==
Loddon Valley Football Netball League: 1985 to Present

- Maiden Gully YCW - 2018, 2022

== 17 & Under Netball Premierships (5) ==
Loddon Valley Football Netball League: 1985 to Present

- YCW - 2007, 2015
- Maiden Gully YCW - 2017, 2019, 2022

== 15 & Under Netball Premierships (6) ==
Loddon Valley Football Netball League: 1985 to Present

- YCW - 2005, 2011, 2012
- Maiden Gully YCW - 2017, 2018, 2019

== League Best & Fairest Winners (Senior Football) ==
Loddon Valley Football Netball League: 1985 to Present - (Frank Harding Medal)

- 1987 - Marty Graham

== League Best & Fairest Winners (Reserves Football) ==
Loddon Valley Football Netball League: 1985 to Present - (John Forbes Medal)

- 1992 - John Jones
- 2005 - Shane Chisholm
- 2021 - Thomas Harrington

== League Best & Fairest Winners (Thirds Football) ==
Loddon Valley Football Netball League: 1985 to Present - (Stephen Dowling Medal)

- 1989 - Michael Franken
- 1990 - Robert Whyte
- 1994 - Adam Turton
- 2006 - Jake Concol
- 2007 - Jake Concol
- 2019 - Mason James
- 2021 - Cody Riddick

== League Best & Fairest Winners (B.J.F.L.) ==
Bendigo Junior Football League:

- 2014 - (U14 R2) - D. Harris
- 2016 - (U14 R1) - J. Gadsden
- 2017 - (U14 R2) - Liam Thomas
- 2021 - (U14 S) - Jonty Davies
- 2022 - (U14 R1) - Lewis Pigdon
- 2023 - (U14 R3) - Hamish Landry

== League Best & Fairest Winners (A-Grade Netball) ==
Loddon Valley Football Netball League: 1985 to Present

- 1988 - Jan Rankin
- 1997 - Nicole Donnellon
- 2001 - Nicole Donnellon
- 2010 - Leisa Barry
- 2013 - Leisa Barry
- 2022 - Tia Webb
- 2023 - Meg Patterson

== League Best & Fairest Winners (B-Grade Netball) ==
Loddon Valley Football Netball League: 1985 to Present

- 2013 - Christie Griffiths
- 2022 - Jarrenhy Webb

== League Best & Fairest Winners (C-Grade Netball) ==
Loddon Valley Football Netball League: 1985 to Present

- 1986 - Karen Bright
- 1990 - Jenny Kelly
- 1993 - Terri Rees
- 2002 - Jessica Fitzpatrick
- 2005 - Phoebe Hall
- 2006 - Casey Etherton
- 2007 - Joanne Read
- 2011 - Alexandra Lacy
- 2015 - Abbey Conway
- 2018 - Kaitlin Waterson
- 2023 - Olivia Hall
- 2024 - Laura Lindner

== League Best & Fairest Winners (C-Reserve Netball) ==
Loddon Valley Football Netball League: 1985 to Present

- 2014 - Alison Clarke
- 2017 - Kaitlin Waterson
- 2018 - Abbey Conway
- 2021 - Grace Pigdon
- 2024 - Tilly Suckling
- 2025 - Hannah Flood

== League Best & Fairest Winners (17 & Under Netball) ==
Loddon Valley Football Netball League: 1985 to Present

- 1999 - Kerrina Keogh
- 2005 - Brittany Eastman
- 2009 - Teaghan Welsh

== League Best & Fairest Winners (15 & Under Netball) ==
Loddon Valley Football Netball League: 1985 to Present

- 2008 - Sophie Alford
- 2010 - Sharna Appleby
