= Jack Crane =

Australian rules footballer

Personal information
- Full name: John Edward Crane
- Born: 26 August 1913; Melbourne, Victoria
- Died: 5 January 1974 (aged 60)
- Original team: Preston (VFA)
- Height: 191 cm (6 ft 3 in)
- Weight: 84 kg (185 lb)

Playing career^{1}
Years	Club	Games (Goals)
1936	Essendon	2 (7)
1937–1942	Richmond	102 (25)
1945–1946	North Melbourne	18 (0)
Total		122 (32)
- ^{1} Playing statistics correct to the end of 1946.

John Edward Crane (26 August 1913 – 5 January 1974) was an Australian rules footballer who played with Essendon, Richmond and North Melbourne in the Victorian Football League (VFL).

Although recruited from Preston, Crane played originally for the South Melbourne seconds. He started his VFL career at Essendon and kicked five goals on his debut, against Hawthorn at Windy Hill.

A dispute with a teammate meant that he was cleared to Richmond after just one more league game and he was used as a full-back at his new club. He spent much of the 1940 VFL season as a key forward, kicking 21 goals. In the grand final that season he was Richmond's centre half-back, but could not prevent a 39-point loss.

Crane served with the Australian armed forces during the war, having enlisted in 1943. He returned to football in 1945, playing 17 games for North Melbourne.

He later coached the Caulfield Football Club.

Two brothers, Len and Tom Crane, were also league footballers.
