= Roy Apted =

Australian rules footballer

Personal information
- Full name: Roy Apted
- Born: 25 April 1937 (age 89)
- Original team: North Launceston
- Height: 180 cm (5 ft 11 in)
- Weight: 86 kg (190 lb)
- Position: Defender

Playing career^{1}
Years	Club	Games (Goals)
1959–63	St Kilda	44 (1)
- ^{1} Playing statistics correct to the end of 1963.

Roy Apted (born 25 April 1937) is a former Australian rules footballer who played for St Kilda in the Victorian Football League (VFL).

A Tasmanian representative at the 1958 Melbourne and 1966 Hobart Carnivals, Apted was primarily a defender but was also used as a ruck rover. He appeared in two losing Grand Finals with North Launceston before being recruited to St Kilda. Apted could never establish himself in the St Kilda team over five seasons and returned to Tasmania where he played with Launceston.
