= Michael Gale (footballer) =

Australian rules footballer

Personal information
- Born: 21 December 1966 (age 59)
- Original team: Marist College / Penguin
- Height: 188 cm (6 ft 2 in)
- Weight: 93 kg (205 lb)

Playing career^{1}
Years	Club	Games (Goals)
1985–1993	Fitzroy	105 (29)
1994–1998	Richmond	91 (20)
Total		196 (49)
- ^{1} Playing statistics correct to the end of 1998.

Michael Gale (born 1966) is a former Australian rules football player who played in the VFL/AFL between 1985 and 1993 for the Fitzroy Football Club and then from 1994 to 1998 for the Richmond Football Club.

His five seasons for the Tigers were played alongside his younger brother, Brendon. Their father, Don Gale, was a champion Tasmanian footballer who became the first player from the NWFU to achieve All Australian selection. Their grandfather, Jack Gale, played three games for Richmond in 1924.
