= Brendon Gale =

Australian rules footballer, born 1968

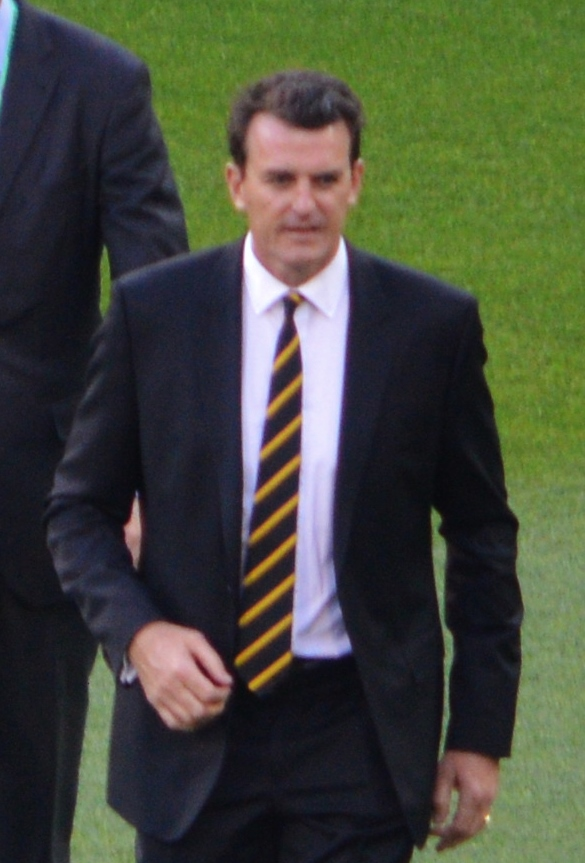
- Gale in his role as club CEO at the unfurling of Richmond's 2017 AFL Premiership flag.

Personal information
- Born: 18 July 1968 (age 58); Burnie, Tasmania
- Original team: Burnie Hawks
- Draft: No. 27, 1987 national draft
- Debut: Round 1, 31 March 1990, Richmond vs. Brisbane, at Carrara Stadium
- Height: 198 cm (6 ft 6 in)
- Weight: 102 kg (225 lb)
- Position: Centre Half-Forward / Ruckman

Playing career^{1}
Years	Club	Games (Goals)
1990–2001	Richmond	244 (209)
- ^{1} Playing statistics correct to the end of 2001.

Career highlights
- Tasmanian Representative Games:- 4; Richmond Life Member 1997; Tasmanian Football Hall of Fame (Legend)

Brendon Gale (born 18 July 1968) is a former Australian rules footballer who played for the Richmond Football Club in the Australian Football League (AFL).

As a qualified lawyer, he practised law with a commercial law firm for some time after his retirement from football, and then was CEO of the AFL Players' Association from 2005 to 2009. In 2009, he began what would become a successful 15-year stint as CEO of Richmond, overseeing three premierships. In 2024, it was announced that he would be leaving Richmond to become inaugural CEO of the incoming Tasmania Football Club.

== Early life and education ==
Brendon Gale was born on 18 July 1968. He grew up in Burnie in Tasmania and attended Marist Regional College.

He studied at Monash University in Melbourne, graduating with Bachelor of Laws and a Master of Arts degrees.

== Playing career ==
Gale played for the Richmond Football Club from 1990 to 2001 as a centre half-forward and later ruckman. For five seasons he played alongside his older brother, Michael, who transferred from the Fitzroy Football Club at the end of the 1993 season. Brendon was appointed vice-captain of the club between 1994 and 1997. Their father, Don Gale, was a champion Tasmanian footballer who became the first player from the NWFU to achieve All Australian selection. Their grandfather, Jack Gale, played three games for Richmond in 1924.

For a period during his playing days Gale played guitar in a small band called Trial By Video, which included other footballers Mark Zanotti, Tony Woods, and Paul Bulluss.

== Post-football career ==
After his AFL playing career, Gale practised law with commercial law firm King Wood Mallesons, and then was chief executive officer of the AFL Players' Association from 2005 to 2009.

He was also a member of the AFL's "Laws of the Game" or Rules Committee.

In 2009, he was appointed CEO of Richmond, leading over 150 people. Under his leadership, the team's Punt Road Oval headquarters was transformed into a high-performance facility, with the club growing extensively both commercially and in fan numbers. It has been competing in most of the AFL finals series, and won the Premiership in 2017, 2019 and 2020.

On 10 May 2024, Gale announced his departure as the CEO of Richmond Football Club at the end of the 2024 season. The same day, Tasmania Football Club announced his appointment as their inaugural CEO, commencing in the role in 2025.

== Other activities ==
Gale is a director on several boards, and advocates for diversity. From 2009 until 2013, he was on the board of the Victorian Human Rights and Equal Opportunity Commission, and has been involved in the "Male Champions of Change" program.

== In media ==
Gale features in the 2021 fly-on-the-wall documentary TV series Making Their Mark, which showed the impact of the COVID-19 pandemic on several AFL clubs, players, and staff. Players Nic Naitanui, Eddie Betts, Stephen Coniglio, and Rory Sloane were featured, as well as Gold Coast Suns football club coach Stuart Dew, and staff leaders Peggy O'Neal, Damien Hardwick, and Gale.

== Statistics ==
Player statistics for Brendon Gale:

Legend
G	Goals	K	Kicks	D	Disposals	T	Tackles
B	Behinds	H	Handballs	M	Marks	H/O	Hit-outs

Season	Team	No.	Games	Totals								Averages (per game)							
Season	Team	No.	Games	G	B	K	H	D	M	T	H/O	G	B	K	H	D	M	T	H/O
1990	Richmond	25	22	21	22	150	75	225	100	24	14	1.0	1.0	6.8	3.4	10.2	4.5	1.1	0.6
1991	Richmond	25	21	16	15	159	104	263	118	16	39	0.8	0.7	7.6	5.0	12.5	5.6	0.8	1.9
1992	Richmond	25	18	7	9	162	112	274	103	15	51	0.4	0.5	9.0	6.2	15.2	5.7	0.8	2.8
1993	Richmond	25	16	26	21	162	91	253	134	10	64	1.6	1.3	10.1	5.7	15.8	8.4	0.6	4.0
1994	Richmond	25	21	27	24	191	101	292	144	14	62	1.3	1.1	9.1	4.8	13.9	6.9	0.7	3.0
1995	Richmond	25	24	30	15	210	95	305	133	28	117	1.3	0.6	8.8	4.0	12.7	5.5	1.2	4.9
1996	Richmond	25	22	34	25	178	88	266	129	20	42	1.5	1.1	8.1	4.0	12.1	5.9	0.9	1.9
1997	Richmond	25	19	12	8	168	93	261	102	26	206	0.6	0.4	8.8	4.9	13.7	5.4	1.4	10.8
1998	Richmond	25	21	4	1	191	144	335	128	22	393	0.2	0.0	9.1	6.9	16.0	6.1	1.0	18.7
1999	Richmond	25	18	6	3	137	77	214	93	17	297	0.3	0.2	7.6	4.3	11.9	5.2	0.9	16.5
2000	Richmond	25	20	22	3	165	86	251	107	15	239	1.1	0.2	8.3	4.3	12.6	5.4	0.8	12.0
2001	Richmond	25	22	4	1	102	149	251	92	24	308	0.2	0.0	4.6	6.8	11.4	4.2	1.1	14.0
Career			244	209	147	1975	1215	3190	1383	231	1832	0.9	0.6	8.1	5.0	13.1	5.7	0.9	7.5
