= Loddon Valley Football Netball League =

Australian rules football league

- Current season, competition or edition: 2026
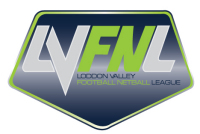
- Sport: Australian rules football Netball
- Founded: 1903 - Loddon Valley Football Association
- CEO: Kyle Smith
- President: Richard Hicks
- No. of teams: 10
- Country: Australia
- Headquarters: Victoria, Australia
- Most recent champion: Bridgewater (26)
- Most titles: Bridgewater (26)
- Sponsor: Bendigo Bank
- Related competitions: List: VFL, BFL, HDFL, MCDFL, NCFL
- Website: LVFNL

The Loddon Valley Football Netball League (LVFNL) is an Australian rules football and netball league based in Central Victoria.

== History ==
The league was formed in 1903 by the Inglewood, Bridgewater, Newbridge and Arnold's Bridge clubs.

Inglewood and Bridgewater withdrew in 1908 to form the Korong District Central Association with Korong Vale and Wedderburn.

The Loddon Valley Association remained based around the Newbridge area until the Bridgewater and Inglewood clubs returned in the late 1930s.

The centre of the league shifted to Inglewood with the inclusion of Bears Lagoon – Serpentine after WW2.

Gradually the smaller clubs such as Rheola, Logan, Arnold's Bridge and Bealiba folded or left the competition until in 1956 northern clubs Calivil, Mitiamo and Yarrawalla were admitted.

A junior competition was introduced in 1959, and Reserves competition in 1970.

== Clubs ==
=== Locations ===
Locations of the Loddon Valley FNL clubs

=== Senior Clubs ===
Club	Guernsey	Nickname	Home Ground	Former League	Est.	Years in LVFL	LVFL Senior Premierships	
Club	Guernsey	Nickname	Home Ground	Former League	Est.	Years in LVFL	Total	Years
Bears Lagoon Serpentine	(1945-2000s)(2000s-)	Bears	Serpentine Recreation Reserve, Serpentine	–	1945	1946-	12	1947, 1948, 1949, 1960, 1961, 1965, 1966, 1982, 1983, 1992, 1994, 1995
Bridgewater		Mean Machines	Bridgewater Recreation Reserve, Bridgewater On Loddon	KFL, BFA	1889	1903-1906, 1915, 1936-1939, 1945-	26	1905, 1906, 1915, 1938, 1939, 1945, 1950, 1955, 1959, 1962, 1963, 1974, 1976, 1980, 1984, 1985, 1988, 1991, 2010, 2011, 2012, 2013, 2014, 2015, 2016, 2026
Calivil United		Demons	Calivil Recreation Reserve, Calivil and Raywood Recreation Reserve, Raywood	–	1996	1997-	8	1998, 2003, 2004, 2005, 2006, 2007, 2008, 2017
Inglewood		Blues	Inglewood Community Sports Centre, Inglewood	IDFL	1876	1903-1907, 1915, 1938-1939, 1945-	9	1903, 1946, 1951, 1953, 1954, 1956, 1958, 1971, 1986
Macorna		Tigers	Macorna Recreation Reserve, Macorna	GRFL	1888	2026-	0	–
Maiden Gully YCW (YCW 1985-2016)	(1985-2016)(2017-)	Eagles	Marist College Bendigo, Maiden Gully	BFNL	1945	1985-	4	1987, 1997, 2001, 2002
Mitiamo		Superoos	Mitiamo Recreation Reserve, Mitiamo	MDFL	1890s	1956-	6	1967, 1977, 1979, 1999, 2009, 2019
Newbridge (Newbridge-Laanecoorie 1947)		Maroons	Newbridge Recreation Reserve, Newbridge	–	1904	1904-	14	1907, 1908, 1909, 1910, 1912, 1929, 1930, 1933, 1937, 1957, 1978, 1993, 2000, 2018
Pyramid Hill		Bulldogs	Mitchell Park, Pyramid Hill	NEFL	1890	1995-	0	–

=== U18s only ===
Club	Colours	Nickname	Home Ground/s	Former League	Est.	Years in LVFL	Notes
East Loddon		Rams	Serpentine Recreation Reserve, Serpentine; Mitiamo Recreation Reserve, Mitiamo and Calivil Recreation Reserve, Calivil	–	2022	2022-	Merged U18s side of BLS, Mitiamo and Calivil

=== Former clubs ===
Club	Guernsey	Nickname	Home Ground	Former League	Est.	Years in LVFL	LVFL Senior Premierships		Fate
Club	Guernsey	Nickname	Home Ground	Former League	Est.	Years in LVFL	Total	Years	Fate
Arnold			Arnold Cricket Reserve, Arnold	–	1900s	1906, 1909, 1914–1915, 1920, 1924, 1926, 1934, 1936–1937, 1946–1952	1	1924	Folded
Bealiba		Woodcutters	Bealiba Recreation Reserve, Bealiba	MCDFNL	1970s	1949–1961	1	1952	Merged with Natte Yallock to form Natte Bealiba in Maryborough Castlemaine District FNL following 1962 season
Calivil		Demons	Calivil Recreation Reserve, Calivil	MDFL	1890s	1956-1996	6	1964, 1968, 1969, 1970, 1990, 1996	Merged with Northern United to form Calivil United following 1996 season
Dunolly	(2001-02)(2003)	Eagles	Deledio Recreation Reserve, Dunolly	LPFL	1873	c.1904, 1936-39, 2001–03	1	1904	Moved to Maryborough Castlemaine District FNL after 2003 season
Eddington				–	1900s	1907-1928	2	1927, 1928	Folded
Goldsborough				–	1890s	1904	0	–	Unknown after 1904. Played in Bealiba FL in 1921.
Korong Vale			Korong Vale Recreation Reserve, Korong Vale	KFL	1891	1950-1990	1	1981	Folded
Laanecoorie				–	1900s	1907-1939	8	1911, 1913, 1919, 1920, 1921, 1922, 1936, 1937	Entered recess after 1939 season. Merged with Newbridge after WWII.
Logan		Tigers	Logan Public Recreation Reserve, Logan	–	1940s	1950-1953	0	–	Folded
Marong		Panthers	Malone Park, Marong	BFNL	1900s	1983-2026	5	1989, 2022, 2023, 2024, 2025	Returned to Bendigo FNL in 2027
Poseidon				–	1900s	1907	0	–	Folded
Rheola			Rheola Pioneers Memorial Park, Rheola	IDFL	1870s	1938-1947	0	–	Folded
Serpentine			Serpentine Recreation Reserve, Serpentine	IDFL	1870s	1939	0	–	Merged with Bears Lagoon to form Bears Lagoon-Serpentine following WWII
Shelbourne				–	1920s	1923-1927	3	1923, 1925, 1926	Folded
Tarnagulla	Dark with lighter left-to-right sash		Tarnagulla Recreation Reserve, Tarnagulla	–	1890s	1904-1908, 1931–1936	2	1930, 1931	Folded
Woodstock			Woodstock Recreation Reserve, Woodstock on Loddon	–	1930s	1934-1936	2	1934, 1935	Folded
Woosang	Dark with lighter vee		Woosang Recreation Reserve, Woosang	KFL	1900s	1950	0	–	Folded
Yarrawalla	(1956–78)(1979–82)	Hawks	Yarrawalla Recreation Reserve, Yarrawalla	MDFL	1946	1956-1982	3	1972, 1973, 1975	Folded

== League awards and honours ==
Senior Football

The winner of the LVFNL senior football best and fairest award receives the Frank Harding Medal, which was first awarded in.

Year	Frank Harding Medal - Best & Fairest	B&F Votes	Leading Goal Kicker	H&A goals	Finals goals	Total Goals
1939	Ron Deludio (Dunolly)					
1940-44	In recess > World War 2					
1945						
1946			George Vanston (Inglewood)	82	0	82
1947			George Vanston (Inglewood)	76	0	76
1948			George Vanston (Inglewood)	82	0	82
1949			George Vanston (Inglewood)	51	0	51
1950			George Vanston (Inglewood)	66	0	66
1951			George Vanston (Inglewood)	64	0	64
1952			George Vanston (Inglewood)	43	0	43
1953			George Vanston (Inglewood)	65	8	73
1954			George Vanston (Inglewood)	57	13	70
1955			Graham O'Shea (Newbridge)	0	0	0
1956	Ralph Metcalf (Inglewood)	31		0	0	0
1957	Andrew Blow (Calivil)		Graham O'Shea (Newbridge)	87	0	87
1958	Steven Storti (Korong Vale)			0	0	0
1959	Ian O'Shea (Newbridge)			0	0	0
1960	George Ennor (Mitiamo)			0	0	0
1961	Ken Smalley (Inglewood)	22	John Canville (Calivil)	56	4	60
1962	Cyril Butler (Bridgewater)		John Canville (Calivil)	46	1	47
1963	Cress Thompson (Mitiamo)		William Redmond (Bridgewater)	51	6	57
1964	Maurie Elliot (Korong Vale)		Ian O'Shea (Newbridge)	33	0	33
1965	Bill Page (BLS)		M Rodda (Bridgewater)	50	1	51
1966	Ron Ford (BLS)		R Medcalf (Inglewood)	38	0	38
1967	John Farmer (Bridgewater)		M Rodda (Bridgewater)	50	2	52
1968	Jocka Keating (Inglewood)	30	B Chilcott (Bridgewater)	51	5	56
1969	Ron Ford (BLS)		Bruce Wick (BLS)	58	4	62
1970	Ron Ford (BLS)		Bruce Wick (BLS)	57	11	68
1971	Colin Hodgsen (Bridgewater)		Barry Ansett (Calivil)	53	6	59
1972	Barry Perryman (Korong Vale)		Bruce Wick (BLS)	66	0	66
1973	John Lynch (Bridgewater)		Bruce Wick (BLS)	58	0	58
1974	Max Coutts (Mitiamo)		Max Baker (Inglewood)	37	6	43
1975	Brett Everall (Korong Vale)		Garry Leech (Mitiamo)	65	8	73
1976	Robert Rothacker (BLS)		Garry Leech (Mitiamo)	65	9	74
1977	Ian Drill (Inglewood)	29	Garry Leech (Mitiamo)	76	6	82
1978	David Cossar (Inglewood)		Alan Jackson (Korong Vale)	111	5	116
1979	Leigh Gallagher (BLS)		Alan Jackson (Korong Vale)	125	0	125
1980	Noel Watson (Newbridge)		Peter Collins (Bridgewater)	126	19	145
1981	Ian Marlow (Mitiamo)		Alan Jackson (Korong Vale)	106	16	122
1982	Peter Lewis (Newbridge)		Peter Collins (Bridgewater)	140	22	162
1983	Peter Hynes (BLS)		Mick Murphy (Calivil)	102	4	106
1984	Chris Pollock (Bridgewater)		Darrell Billett (Inglewood)	94	7	101
1985	Russell Boorn (Calivil)		Kelvin Dows (Inglewood)	90	7	97
1986	Peter Hynes (BLS)		Kelvin Dows (Inglewood)	97	6	103
1987	Russell Boorn (Calivil); Marty Graham (YCW)		Kelvin Dows (Inglewood)	105	15	120
1988	Shawn McCormick (Mitiamo)		Colin Grenfell (Bridgewater)	97	5	102
1989	Terry Noden (Marong)		Kelvin Dows (Inglewood)	56	10	66
1990	Steven Robinson (Inglewood)		Matt Cullen (Marong)	55	6	61
1991	Peter Larson (Inglewood); Ian Garland (Bridgewater)		Rod Wight (Calivil)	61	5	66
1992	Bert McIvor (Newbridge)		Travis Hall (Bridgewater)	64	8	72
1993	Scott Niemann (BLS)		David Sullivan (Marong)	106	10	116
1994	Peter Larson (Inglewood)		David Sullivan (Marong)	105	14	119
1995	Darren Featherby (BLS)		Shawn McCormick (Mitiamo)	59	12	71
1996	Dale Pannington (Marong); Dennis Kelly (BLS)		Steve Robinson (YCW)	62	1	63
1997	Andrew Wild (Calivil); Barry Stewart (PH)		Shawn McCormick (Mitiamo)	87	6	93
1998	Tim Wicks (Mitiamo)		Shawn McCormick (Mitiamo)	72	8	80
1999	Ray Bramley (Marong)		Shawn McCormick (Mitiamo)	72	13	85
2000	Ross Pointon (BLS)		Greg Gadsen (BLS)	87	12	99
2001	Tim Wicks (Mitiamo)		Scott Carson (Newbridge)	102	0	102
2002	Dallas Slingo (Inglewood)	22	Greg Gadsen (BLS)	108	0	108
2003	Steve Cox (Newbridge)		Greg Gadsen (BLS)	114	7	121
2004	Nathan Sachse (PH)		Phillip Hetherington (Calivil)	83	9	92
2005	Wayne Landry (Marong)		Phillip Hetherington (Calivil)	103	0	103
2006	Nathan McNally (BLS)		David McCormack (YCW)	109	0	109
2007	Tim Wicks (Mitiamo)	22	Matthew Chilcott (PH)	101	6	107
2008	Lee Franklin (Marong)	20	Ryan Haythorpe (Mitiamo)	77	0	77
2009	Luan Marsh (PH)	18	Ryan Haythorpe (Mitiamo)	63	19	82
2010	Luke Mitchell (Mitiamo)	20	Ryan Haythorpe (Mitiamo)	100	10	110
2011	Luke Mitchell (Mitiamo)	19	Brad Rohde (Bridgewater)	78	9	87
2012	Corey Gregg (Marong)	24	Brad Rohde (Bridgewater)	68	7	75
2013	Adam Parry (Bridgewater)	22	Alexander Collins (Bridgewater)	93	16	109
2014	Adam Parry (Bridgewater)	29	Rhys Ford (Newbridge)	74	5	79
2015	Andrew Collins (Bridgewater)	27	Andrew Collins (Bridgewater)	56	2	58
2016	Zeb Broadbent (Bridgewater)	31	Justin Maddern (Mitiamo)	93	12	105
2017	Ben Knight (Calivil)	25	Bryce Curnow (Calivil)	76	10	86
2018	Chris Down (Calivil)	28	Jordan Gilboy (Newbridge)	70	4	74
2019	Terry Reeves (Mitiamo)	23	Braidy Dickens (Pyramid Hill)	60	10	70
2020	Season cancelled due to COVID-19 pandemic in Victoria					
2021	Harry Whittle (Newbridge)	15	Joshua Martyn (Bridgewater)	57	0	57
2022	Billy Micevski (Pyramid Hill)	23	Brandyn Grenfell (Marong)	143	11	154
2023	Dylan Collis (Pyramid Hill)	19	Brandyn Grenfell (Marong)	103	7	110
2024	Justin Laird (BLS)	28	Lachie Sharp (Bridgewater)	128	10	138
2025	Lachie Sharp (Bridgewater)	17	Lachie Sharp (Bridgewater)	109	15	124
2026	Luke Ellings (Bridgewater)	25	Lachie Sharp (Bridgewater)	148	8	156

== Premierships ==
Senior Football

- 1903 Inglewood
- 1904 Dunolly
- 1905 Bridgewater
- 1906 Bridgewater
- 1907 Newbridge
- 1908 Newbridge
- 1909 Newbridge
- 1910 Newbridge
- 1911 Laanecoorie
- 1912 Newbridge
- 1913 Laanecoorie
- 1914 Newbridge
- 1915 Bridgewater
- 1916–1918 - WWI
- 1919 Laanecoorie
- 1920 Laanecoorie
- 1921 Laanecoorie
- 1922 Laanecoorie
- 1923 Shelbourne
- 1924 Arnold
- 1925 Shelbourne
- 1926 Shelbourne
- 1927 Eddington
- 1928 Eddington
- 1929 Newbridge
- 1930 Newbridge
- 1931 Tarnagulla
- 1932 Tarnagulla
- 1933 Newbridge
- 1934 Woodstock
- 1935 Woodstock
- 1936 Laanecoorie
- 1937 Laanecoorie
- 1938 Bridgewater
- 1939 Bridgewater
- 1940–1944 - WWII
- 1945 Bridgewater
- 1946 Inglewood
- 1947 BL-Serpentine
- 1948 BL-Serpentine
- 1949 BL-Serpentine
- 1950 Bridgewater
- 1951 Inglewood
- 1952 Bealiba
- 1953 Inglewood
- 1954 Inglewood
- 1955 Bridgewater
- 1956 Inglewood
- 1957 Newbridge
- 1958 Inglewood
- 1959 Bridgewater
- 1960 BL-Serpentine
- 1961 BL-Serpentine
- 1962 Bridgewater
- 1963 Bridgewater
- 1964 Calivil
- 1965 BL-Serpentine
- 1966 BL-Serpentine
- 1967 Mitiamo
- 1968 Calivil
- 1969 Calivil
- 1970 Calivil
- 1971 Inglewood
- 1972 Yarrawalla
- 1973 Yarrawalla
- 1974 Bridgewater
- 1975 Yarrawalla
- 1976 Bridgewater
- 1977 Mitiamo
- 1978 Newbridge
- 1979 Mitiamo
- 1980 Bridgewater
- 1981 Korong Vale
- 1982 BL-Serpentine
- 1983 BL-Serpentine
- 1984 Bridgewater
- 1985 Bridgewater
- 1986 Inglewood
- 1987 YCW
- 1988 Bridgewater
- 1989 Marong
- 1990 Calivil
- 1991 Bridgewater
- 1992 BL-Serpentine
- 1993 Newbridge
- 1994 BL-Serpentine
- 1995 BL-Serpentine
- 1996 Calivil
- 1997 YCW
- 1998 Calivil
- 1999 Mitiamo
- 2000 Newbridge
- 2001 YCW
- 2002 YCW
- 2003 Calivil
- 2004 Calivil
- 2005 Calivil
- 2006 Calivil
- 2007 Calivil
- 2008 Calivil
- 2009 Mitiamo
- 2010 Bridgewater
- 2011 Bridgewater
- 2012 Bridgewater
- 2013 Bridgewater
- 2014 Bridgewater
- 2015 Bridgewater
- 2016 Bridgewater
- 2017 Calivil
- 2018 Newbridge
- 2019 Mitiamo
- 2020 Season cancelled > COVID 19
- 2021 Finals abandoned > COVID 19
- 2022 Marong
- 2023 Marong
- 2024 Marong
- 2025 Marong
- 2026 Bridgewater

== Current Finals System ==
=== Finals Format ===
Qualifying/Elimination Final
2	Qualifying Final; 2nd
3	3rd
4	Elimination Final; 4th
5	5th

Semi Finals
1	2nd Semi Final; 1st
Winner of Qualifying Final
1st Semi Final; Loser of Qualifying Final
Winner of Elimination Final

Preliminary Final
Loser of 2nd Semi Final
Winner of 1st Semi Final

Grand Final
Winner of 2nd Semi Final
Winner of Preliminary Final

==== Week one ====
- Qualifying Final: 2nd ranked team meets 3rd ranked team. Winner proceeds to Week 2 (2nd Semi Final). Loser proceeds to Week 2 (1st Semi Final).
- Elimination Final: 4th ranked team meets 5th ranked team. Winner proceeds to Week 2 (1st Semi Final). Loser is Eliminated.

==== Week two ====
- 1st Semi Final: Loser of Qualifying Final meets winner of Elimination Final. Winner proceeds to Week 3 (Preliminary Final). Loser is Eliminated.
- 2nd Semi Final: 1st ranked team meets winner of Qualifying Final. Winner proceeds to Week 4 (Grand Final). Loser proceeds to Week 3 (Preliminary Final).

==== Week three ====
- Preliminary Final: Loser of 2nd Semi Final meets winner of 1st Semi Final. Winner proceeds to Week 4 (Grand Final). Loser is Eliminated.

==== Week four ====
- Grand Final: Winner of 2nd Semi Final meets winner of Preliminary Final. Winner is crowned Premier.

== Season results ==
=== 2001 Ladder ===
Team	Wins	Byes	Losses	Draws	For	Against	%	Pts	Final	Team	G	B	Pts	Team	G	B	Pts
Newbridge	16	0	2	0	2178	1151	189.23%	64	Elimination	Mitiamo	10	10	70	Calivil United	8	4	52
YCW	14	0	4	0	2175	1131	192.31%	56	Qualifying	YCW	19	11	125	Bears-Lagoon Serpentine	14	9	93
Bears-Lagoon Serpentine	13	0	5	0	2317	1470	157.62%	52	1st Semi	Mitiamo	20	4	124	Bears-Lagoon Serpentine	17	8	110
Mitiamo	12	0	6	0	1602	1422	112.66%	48	2nd Semi	Newbridge	16	17	113	YCW	6	12	48
Calivil United	8	0	10	0	1429	1366	104.61%	32	Preliminary	YCW	9	9	63	Mitiamo	6	8	44
Marong	8	0	10	0	1436	1694	84.77%	32	Grand Final	YCW	12	16	88	Newbridge	9	10	64
Dunolly	6	0	12	0	1537	1928	79.72%	24									
Bridgewater	6	0	12	0	1442	1955	73.76%	24									
Inglewood	5	0	13	0	1354	2069	65.44%	20									
Pyramid Hill	2	0	16	0	1037	2319	44.72%	8									

=== 2002 Ladder ===
Team	Wins	Byes	Losses	Draws	For	Against	%	Pts	Final	Team	G	B	Pts	Team	G	B	Pts
Calivil United	14	0	4	0	1627	1159	140.38%	56	Elimination	YCW	15	9	99	Inglewood	10	6	66
Newbridge	14	0	4	0	1959	1449	135.20%	56	Qualifying	Newbridge	12	9	81	Mitiamo	12	3	75
Mitiamo	13	0	5	0	1814	1204	150.66%	52	1st Semi	YCW	14	10	94	Mitiamo	6	16	52
YCW	11	0	7	0	1850	1361	135.93%	44	2nd Semi	Calivil United	12	13	85	Newbridge	12	9	81
Inglewood	11	0	7	0	1724	1306	132.01%	44	Preliminary	YCW	12	13	85	Newbridge	9	10	64
Pyramid Hill	10	0	8	0	1588	1536	103.39%	40	Grand Final	YCW	9	13	67	Calivil United	4	5	29
Bears-Lagoon Serpentine	8	0	10	0	1750	1758	99.54%	32									
Dunolly	5	0	13	0	1421	1912	74.32%	20									
Marong	3	0	15	0	1335	2131	62.65%	12									
Bridgewater	1	0	17	0	924	2123	43.52%	4									

=== 2003 Ladder ===
Team	Wins	Byes	Losses	Draws	For	Against	%	Pts	Final	Team	G	B	Pts	Team	G	B	Pts
Mitiamo	16	0	2	0	2262	918	246.41%	64	Elimination	Bears-Lagoon Serpentine	16	11	107	Newbridge	8	14	62
Calivil United	15	0	3	0	2322	1156	200.87%	60	Qualifying	Calivil United	9	12	66	Inglewood	8	9	57
Inglewood	13	0	5	0	2417	1213	199.26%	52	1st Semi	Inglewood	17	15	117	Bears-Lagoon Serpentine	11	4	70
Bears-Lagoon Serpentine	12	0	6	0	2751	1396	197.06%	48	2nd Semi	Calivil United	9	10	64	Mitiamo	9	3	57
Newbridge	11	0	7	0	2110	1343	157.11%	44	Preliminary	Mitiamo	22	5	137	Inglewood	11	4	70
Marong	9	0	9	0	1873	1624	115.33%	36	Grand Final	Calivil United	13	9	87	Mitiamo	10	9	69
Pyramid Hill	7	0	11	0	1834	1640	111.83%	28									
YCW	5	0	13	0	1573	1905	82.57%	20									
Bridgewater	2	0	16	0	1004	2907	34.54%	8									
Dunolly	0	0	18	0	396	4440	8.92%	0									

=== 2004 Ladder ===
Team	Wins	Byes	Losses	Draws	For	Against	%	Pts	Final	Team	G	B	Pts	Team	G	B	Pts
Calivil United	16	2	0	0	1966	893	220.16%	64	Elimination	Pyramid Hill	26	13	169	Bears-Lagoon Serpentine	8	14	62
Mitiamo	13	2	3	0	1545	916	168.67%	52	Qualifying	Mitiamo	10	11	71	Marong	6	6	42
Marong	10	2	6	0	1696	1003	169.09%	40	1st Semi	Marong	13	14	92	Pyramid Hill	7	14	56
Bears-Lagoon Serpentine	10	2	6	0	1867	1311	142.41%	40	2nd Semi	Calivil United	17	10	112	Mitiamo	11	13	79
Pyramid Hill	9	2	7	0	1538	1192	129.03%	36	Preliminary	Marong	18	13	121	Mitiamo	13	11	89
Newbridge	7	2	9	0	1770	1402	126.25%	28	Grand Final	Calivil United	19	12	126	Marong	8	12	60
YCW	4	2	12	0	1224	1678	72.94%	16									
Bridgewater	3	2	13	0	1137	1483	76.67%	12									
Inglewood	0	2	16	0	465	3330	13.96%	0									

=== 2005 Ladder ===
Team	Wins	Byes	Losses	Draws	For	Against	%	Pts	Final	Team	G	B	Pts	Team	G	B	Pts
Calivil United	16	2	0	0	2250	942	238.85%	64	Elimination	Marong	14	4	88	Bridgewater	10	10	70
Bears-Lagoon Serpentine	13	2	3	0	2466	1446	170.54%	52	Qualifying	Pyramid Hill	14	7	91	Bears-Lagoon Serpentine	11	6	72
Pyramid Hill	11	2	5	0	1928	1308	147.40%	44	1st Semi	Bears-Lagoon Serpentine	12	14	86	Marong	7	16	58
Marong	9	2	7	0	1705	1509	112.99%	36	2nd Semi	Calivil United	19	12	126	Pyramid Hill	9	6	60
Bridgewater	7	2	9	0	1527	1802	84.74%	28	Preliminary	Bears-Lagoon Serpentine	16	11	107	Pyramid Hill	14	12	96
YCW	6	2	10	0	1399	1580	88.54%	24	Grand Final	Calivil United	21	11	137	Bears-Lagoon Serpentine	16	12	108
Newbridge	6	2	10	0	1349	1690	79.82%	24									
Mitiamo	4	2	12	0	1221	1926	63.40%	16									
Inglewood	0	2	16	0	887	2529	35.07%	0									

=== 2006 Ladder ===
Team	Wins	Byes	Losses	Draws	For	Against	%	Pts	Final	Team	G	B	Pts	Team	G	B	Pts
Pyramid Hill	13	2	3	0	1820	843	215.90%	52	Elimination	YCW	14	13	97	Bears-Lagoon Serpentine	16	8	104
Calivil United	12	2	4	0	1929	1136	169.81%	48	Qualifying	Newbridge	12	9	81	Calivil United	7	9	51
Newbridge	12	2	4	0	1775	1212	146.45%	48	1st Semi	Calivil United	24	18	162	Bears-Lagoon Serpentine	9	5	59
YCW	11	2	4	1	1817	1094	166.09%	46	2nd Semi	Pyramid Hill	16	12	108	Newbridge	12	11	83
Bears-Lagoon Serpentine	9	2	6	1	1596	1344	118.75%	38	Preliminary	Calivil United	16	17	113	Newbridge	4	9	33
Mitiamo	8	2	8	0	1547	1526	101.38%	32	Grand Final	Calivil United	15	20	110	Pyramid Hill	9	4	58
Bridgewater	3	2	13	0	1163	1880	61.86%	12									
Marong	3	2	13	0	1147	1912	59.99%	12									
Inglewood	0	2	16	0	756	2603	29.04%	0									

=== 2007 Ladder ===
Team	Wins	Byes	Losses	Draws	For	Against	%	Pts	Final	Team	G	B	Pts	Team	G	B	Pts
Newbridge	15	2	1	0	2095	1128	185.73%	60	Elimination	Pyramid Hill	13	22	100	Bridgewater	6	8	44
Calivil United	11	2	5	0	1622	1253	129.45%	44	Qualifying	Calivil United	12	13	85	Mitiamo	10	7	67
Mitiamo	11	2	5	0	1676	1446	115.91%	44	1st Semi	Mitiamo	18	13	121	Pyramid Hill	11	14	80
Bridgewater	8	2	7	1	1414	1351	104.66%	34	2nd Semi	Calivil United	17	19	121	Newbridge	11	16	82
Pyramid Hill	8	2	8	0	1621	1328	122.06%	32	Preliminary	Newbridge	14	16	100	Mitiamo	14	6	90
YCW	7	2	8	1	1629	1427	114.16%	30	Grand Final	Calivil United	16	16	112	Newbridge	12	13	85
Bears-Lagoon Serpentine	6	2	10	0	1420	1869	75.98%	24									
Inglewood	4	2	12	0	1248	1970	63.35%	16									
Marong	1	2	15	0	1179	2132	55.30%	4									

=== 2008 Ladder ===
Team	Wins	Byes	Losses	Draws	For	Against	%	Pts	Final	Team	G	B	Pts	Team	G	B	Pts
Pyramid Hill	14	2	2	0	1760	925	190.27%	56	Elimination	Bridgewater	12	13	85	Marong	9	13	67
Calivil United	13	2	3	0	1810	1006	179.92%	52	Qualifying	Calivil United	20	14	134	Mitiamo	14	6	90
Mitiamo	10	2	6	0	1683	1408	119.53%	40	1st Semi	Bridgewater	9	14	68	Mitiamo	6	7	43
Bridgewater	10	2	6	0	1477	1394	105.95%	40	2nd Semi	Calivil United	8	13	61	Pyramid Hill	4	6	30
Marong	8	2	8	0	1439	1347	106.83%	32	Preliminary	Pyramid Hill	14	15	99	Bridgewater	11	14	80
Bears-Lagoon Serpentine	7	2	9	0	1455	1611	90.32%	28	Grand Final	Calivil United	16	17	113	Pyramid Hill	6	9	45
Inglewood	5	2	11	0	1261	1547	81.51%	20									
Newbridge	4	2	12	0	1208	1743	69.31%	16									
YCW	1	2	15	0	922	2034	45.33%	4									

=== 2009 Ladder ===
Team	Wins	Byes	Losses	Draws	For	Against	%	Pts	Final	Team	G	B	Pts	Team	G	B	Pts
Pyramid Hill	13	2	3	0	1654	921	179.59%	52	Elimination	Marong	13	11	89	Bridgewater	11	11	77
Mitiamo	12	2	3	1	1701	1140	149.21%	50	Qualifying	Mitiamo	16	22	118	Calivil United	11	12	78
Calivil United	12	2	4	0	1552	961	161.50%	48	1st Semi	Calivil United	16	15	111	Marong	8	10	58
Marong	11	2	5	0	1461	1106	132.10%	44	2nd Semi	Mitiamo	12	15	87	Pyramid Hill	4	14	38
Bridgewater	9	2	6	1	1543	1163	132.67%	38	Preliminary	Calivil United	14	12	96	Pyramid Hill	9	9	63
Newbridge	7	2	9	0	1354	1346	100.59%	28	Grand Final	Mitiamo	22	11	143	Calivil United	12	13	85
Inglewood	3	2	13	0	1051	1767	59.48%	12									
YCW	3	2	13	0	1021	1827	55.88%	12									
Bears-Lagoon Serpentine	1	2	15	0	934	2040	45.78%	4									

=== 2010 Ladder ===
Team	Wins	Byes	Losses	Draws	For	Against	%	Pts	Final	Team	G	B	Pts	Team	G	B	Pts
Bridgewater	15	2	1	0	1955	914	213.89%	60	Elimination	Mitiamo	13	17	95	YCW	12	7	79
Pyramid Hill	14	2	2	0	1899	1033	183.83%	56	Qualifying	Pyramid Hill	7	5	47	Calivil United	3	13	31
Calivil United	12	2	4	0	1589	1195	132.97%	48	1st Semi	Calivil United	23	15	153	Mitiamo	12	8	80
Mitiamo	11	2	5	0	1988	1182	168.19%	44	2nd Semi	Bridgewater	13	10	88	Pyramid Hill	9	7	61
YCW	7	2	9	0	1299	1307	99.39%	28	Preliminary	Calivil United	7	7	49	Pyramid Hill	4	17	41
Inglewood	5	2	11	0	1225	1584	77.34%	20	Grand Final	Bridgewater	27	6	168	Calivil United	7	11	53
Marong	4	2	12	0	1131	1859	60.84%	16									
Newbridge	3	2	13	0	1270	1617	78.54%	12									
Bears-Lagoon Serpentine	1	2	15	0	829	2494	33.24%	4									

=== 2011 Ladder ===
Team	Wins	Byes	Losses	Draws	For	Against	%	Pts	Final	Team	G	B	Pts	Team	G	B	Pts
Bridgewater	15	2	1	0	2233	998	223.75%	60	Elimination	Mitiamo	19	14	128	Calivil United	17	14	116
Pyramid Hill	13	2	3	0	1740	997	174.52%	52	Qualifying	Pyramid Hill	16	10	106	YCW	9	6	60
YCW	12	2	4	0	1794	1367	131.24%	48	1st Semi	YCW	16	26	122	Mitiamo	14	9	93
Calivil United	9	2	7	0	1599	1472	108.63%	36	2nd Semi	Bridgewater	11	16	82	Pyramid Hill	7	13	55
Mitiamo	8	2	8	0	1600	1532	104.44%	32	Preliminary	Pyramid Hill	10	12	72	YCW	9	16	70
Bears-Lagoon Serpentine	7	2	9	0	1570	1563	100.45%	28	Grand Final	Bridgewater	22	18	150	Pyramid Hill	7	9	51
Newbridge	4	2	12	0	1453	1964	73.98%	16									
Marong	3	2	13	0	1316	1967	66.90%	12									
Inglewood	1	2	15	0	924	2369	39.00%	4									

=== 2012 Ladder ===
Team	Wins	Byes	Losses	Draws	For	Against	%	Pts	Final	Team	G	B	Pts	Team	G	B	Pts
Bridgewater	13	2	2	1	1796	1034	173.69%	62	Elimination	Bears-Lagoon Serpentine	13	13	91	Calivil United	7	12	54
Newbridge	11	2	5	0	1946	1165	167.04%	52	Qualifying	Pyramid Hill	14	7	91	Newbridge	8	9	57
Pyramid Hill	11	2	5	0	1610	1109	145.18%	52	1st Semi	Newbridge	18	11	119	Bears-Lagoon Serpentine	15	16	106
Bears-Lagoon Serpentine	11	2	5	0	1939	1403	138.20%	52	2nd Semi	Bridgewater	16	17	113	Pyramid Hill	8	7	55
Calivil United	10	2	5	1	1610	1264	127.37%	50	Preliminary	Newbridge	14	13	97	Pyramid Hill	7	8	50
Marong	8	2	8	0	1529	1604	95.32%	40	Grand Final	Bridgewater	21	12	138	Newbridge	10	13	73
YCW	4	2	12	0	1118	1819	61.46%	24									
Mitiamo	3	2	13	0	1166	1792	65.07%	20									
Inglewood	0	2	16	0	837	2361	35.45%	8									

=== 2013 Ladder ===
Team	Wins	Byes	Losses	Draws	For	Against	%	Pts	Final	Team	G	B	Pts	Team	G	B	Pts
Bears-Lagoon Serpentine	15	2	1	0	2065	869	237.63%	68	Elimination	Marong	13	12	90	Newbridge	2	5	17
Bridgewater	13	2	3	0	1756	943	186.21%	60	Qualifying	Bridgewater	8	19	67	Pyramid Hill	9	8	62
Pyramid Hill	12	2	4	0	1869	1014	184.32%	56	1st Semi	Pyramid Hill	17	9	111	Marong	11	9	75
Newbridge	11	2	5	0	1489	1190	125.13%	52	2nd Semi	Bridgewater	16	14	110	Bears-Lagoon Serpentine	16	13	109
Marong	9	2	7	0	1549	1349	114.83%	44	Preliminary	Bears-Lagoon Serpentine	19	10	124	Pyramid Hill	10	6	66
Calivil United	6	2	10	0	1094	1393	78.54%	32	Grand Final	Bridgewater	15	11	101	Bears-Lagoon Serpentine	13	15	93
YCW	3	2	13	0	976	1850	52.76%	20									
Mitiamo	2	2	14	0	792	1902	41.64%	16									
Inglewood	1	2	15	0	879	1959	44.87%	12									

=== 2014 Ladder ===
Team	Wins	Byes	Losses	Draws	For	Against	%	Pts	Final	Team	G	B	Pts	Team	G	B	Pts
Bridgewater	16	2	0	0	2211	765	289.02%	72	Elimination	Marong	11	14	80	Newbridge	10	15	75
Pyramid Hill	12	2	4	0	1639	1186	138.20%	56	Qualifying	Bears-Lagoon Serpentine	13	13	91	Pyramid Hill	12	13	85
Bears-Lagoon Serpentine	11	2	5	0	1782	1325	134.49%	52	1st Semi	Pyramid Hill	13	9	87	Marong	7	11	53
Newbridge	10	2	6	0	1744	1114	156.55%	48	2nd Semi	Bridgewater	16	14	110	Bears-Lagoon Serpentine	8	9	57
Marong	10	2	6	0	1495	1340	111.57%	48	Preliminary	Bears-Lagoon Serpentine	17	12	114	Pyramid Hill	14	9	93
YCW	5	2	11	0	1270	1587	80.03%	28	Grand Final	Bridgewater	22	15	147	Bears-Lagoon Serpentine	7	9	51
Mitiamo	4	2	12	0	1278	1582	80.78%	24									
Calivil United	3	2	13	0	925	1949	47.46%	20									
Inglewood	1	2	15	0	705	2201	32.03%	12									

=== 2015 Ladder ===
Team	Wins	Byes	Losses	Draws	For	Against	%	Pts	Final	Team	G	B	Pts	Team	G	B	Pts
Bridgewater	15	2	1	0	2015	788	255.71%	60	Elimination	Mitiamo	19	9	123	Calivil United	6	6	42
Pyramid Hill	13	2	3	0	1820	1113	163.52%	52	Qualifying	Bears-Lagoon Serpentine	20	11	131	Pyramid Hill	20	7	127
Bears-Lagoon Serpentine	9	2	7	0	1558	1376	113.23%	36	1st Semi	Mitiamo	13	14	92	Pyramid Hill	9	14	68
Mitiamo	8	2	8	0	1392	1252	111.18%	32	2nd Semi	Bridgewater	21	18	144	Bears-Lagoon Serpentine	4	12	36
Calivil United	8	2	8	0	1324	1322	100.15%	32	Preliminary	Mitiamo	20	16	136	Bears-Lagoon Serpentine	12	10	82
Marong	8	2	8	0	1202	1381	87.04%	32	Grand Final	Bridgewater	17	14	116	Mitiamo	8	12	60
Newbridge	6	2	9	1	1202	1426	84.29%	26									
YCW	3	2	12	1	854	1473	57.98%	14									
Inglewood	1	2	15	0	757	1993	37.98%	4									

=== 2016 Ladder ===
Team	Wins	Byes	Losses	Draws	For	Against	%	Pts	Final	Team	G	B	Pts	Team	G	B	Pts
Bridgewater	16	2	0	0	2218	771	287.68%	64	Elimination	Pyramid Hill	15	11	101	Marong	8	8	56
Mitiamo	13	2	3	0	1587	1126	140.94%	52	Qualifying	Mitiamo	18	12	120	Calivil United	11	14	80
Calivil United	11	2	5	0	1468	1074	136.69%	44	1st Semi	Calivil United	21	19	145	Pyramid Hill	7	10	52
Marong	8	2	8	0	1306	1379	94.71%	32	2nd Semi	Bridgewater	15	18	108	Mitiamo	7	7	49
Pyramid Hill	7	2	9	0	1252	1347	92.95%	28	Preliminary	Mitiamo	13	21	99	Calivil United	13	9	87
Newbridge	7	2	9	0	1162	1291	90.01%	28	Grand Final	Bridgewater	19	12	126	Mitiamo	10	16	76
Inglewood	5	2	11	0	1176	1549	75.92%	20									
YCW	5	2	11	0	920	1482	62.08%	20									
Bears-Lagoon Serpentine	0	2	16	0	828	1898	43.62%	0									

=== 2017 Ladder ===
Team	Wins	Byes	Losses	Draws	For	Against	%	Pts	Final	Team	G	B	Pts	Team	G	B	Pts
Calivil United	15	2	1	0	1807	953	189.61%	60	Elimination	Mitiamo	14	8	92	Bears-Lagoon Serpentine	8	9	57
Bridgewater	11	2	5	0	1501	1082	138.72%	44	Qualifying	Bridgewater	11	7	73	Newbridge	10	11	71
Newbridge	11	2	5	0	1257	1145	109.78%	44	1st Semi	Newbridge	16	13	109	Mitiamo	8	12	60
Mitiamo	9	2	7	0	1364	992	137.50%	36	2nd Semi	Bridgewater	13	13	91	Calivil United	12	10	82
Bears-Lagoon Serpentine	9	2	7	0	1410	1222	115.38%	36	Preliminary	Calivil United	13	12	90	Newbridge	7	11	53
Pyramid Hill	8	2	8	0	1497	1202	124.54%	32	Grand Final	Calivil United	13	16	94	Bridgewater	8	12	60
Marong	5	2	11	0	1106	1548	71.45%	20									
Maiden Gully YCW	3	2	13	0	980	1680	58.33%	12									
Inglewood	1	2	15	0	881	1979	44.52%	4									

=== 2018 Ladder ===
Team	Wins	Byes	Losses	Draws	For	Against	%	Pts	Final	Team	G	B	Pts	Team	G	B	Pts
Newbridge	14	2	2	0	1629	1010	161.29%	56	Elimination	Mitiamo	17	15	117	Bears-Lagoon Serpentine	6	2	38
Maiden Gully YCW	12	2	4	0	1500	1206	124.38%	48	Qualifying	Maiden Gully YCW	16	12	108	Pyramid Hill	10	15	75
Pyramid Hill	10	2	6	0	1143	1177	97.11%	40	1st Semi	Mitiamo	10	17	77	Pyramid Hill	11	10	76
Bears-Lagoon Serpentine	9	2	7	0	1551	1208	128.39%	36	2nd Semi	Newbridge	20	12	132	Maiden Gully YCW	13	4	82
Mitiamo	9	2	7	0	1321	1102	119.87%	36	Preliminary	Mitiamo	16	20	116	Maiden Gully YCW	12	8	80
Calivil United	7	2	9	0	1295	1140	113.60%	28	Grand Final	Newbridge	11	11	77	Mitiamo	4	9	33
Bridgewater	7	2	9	0	1396	1335	104.57%	28									
Marong	3	2	13	0	1102	1729	63.74%	12									
Inglewood	1	2	15	0	923	1953	47.26%	4									

=== 2019 Ladder ===
Team	Wins	Byes	Losses	Draws	For	Against	%	Pts	Final	Team	G	B	Pts	Team	G	B	Pts
Pyramid Hill	13	2	3	0	1753	884	198.30%	52	Elimination	Maiden Gully YCW	14	7	91	Calivil United	8	10	58
Mitiamo	13	2	3	0	1567	881	177.87%	52	Qualifying	Mitiamo	19	9	123	Bears-Lagoon Serpentine	11	8	74
Bears-Lagoon Serpentine	10	2	5	1	1264	1161	108.87%	42	1st Semi	Bears-Lagoon Serpentine	11	13	79	Maiden Gully YCW	8	10	58
Maiden Gully YCW	9	2	7	0	1271	1154	110.14%	36	2nd Semi	Mitiamo	11	22	88	Pyramid Hill	10	6	66
Calivil United	7	2	7	0	1248	1184	105.41%	28	Preliminary	Pyramid Hill	14	15	99	Bears-Lagoon Serpentine	9	10	64
Marong	7	2	9	0	1189	1209	98.35%	28	Grand Final	Mitiamo	11	16	82	Pyramid Hill	9	6	60
Bridgewater	7	2	9	0	1288	1541	83.58%	28									
Newbridge	5	2	10	1	1006	1167	86.20%	22									
Inglewood	0	2	16	0	728	2133	34.13%	0									

=== 2020 Ladder ===
Team	Wins	Byes	Losses	Draws	For	Against	%	Pts
Bears-Lagoon Serpentine
Bridgewater
Calivil United
Inglewood
Maiden Gully YCW	Season cancelled due to COVID-19 pandemic in Victoria							
Marong
Mitiamo
Newbridge
Pyramid Hill

=== 2021 Ladder ===
Home & Away Season was reduced by 5 rounds and Finals series abandoned due to COVID-19 pandemic in Victoria

Team	Wins	Byes	Losses	Draws	For	Against	%	Pts
Mitiamo	12	1	0	0	1399	478	292.68%	48
Marong	10	1	2	0	1490	541	275.42%	40
Bridgewater	10	1	2	0	1479	683	216.54%	40
Pyramid Hill	7	1	5	0	1158	707	163.79%	28
Bears-Lagoon Serpentine	5	2	6	0	1001	890	112.47%	20
Maiden Gully YCW	4	2	7	0	980	848	115.57%	16
Newbridge	2	2	9	0	507	1122	45.19%	8
Calivil United	2	2	9	0	515	1395	36.92%	8
Inglewood	0	1	12	0	293	2158	13.58%	0

=== 2022 Ladder ===
Team	Wins	Byes	Losses	Draws	For	Against	%	Pts	Final	Team	G	B	Pts	Team	G	B	Pts
Marong	15	2	1	0	2491	709	351.34%	60	Elimination	Bridgewater	14	13	97	Bears-Lagoon Serpentine	6	6	42
Pyramid Hill	15	2	1	0	1901	668	284.58%	60	Qualifying	Pyramid Hill	19	13	127	Mitiamo	11	11	77
Mitiamo	10	2	6	0	1379	1129	122.14%	40	1st Semi	Bridgewater	20	6	126	Mitiamo	11	11	77
Bridgewater	10	2	6	0	1355	1200	112.92%	40	2nd Semi	Marong	14	28	102	Pyramid Hill	6	8	44
Bears-Lagoon Serpentine	7	2	9	0	1079	1492	72.32%	28	Preliminary	Bridgewater	11	6	72	Pyramid Hill	8	10	58
Maiden Gully YCW	5	2	11	0	1081	1620	66.73%	20	Grand Final	Marong	19	11	125	Bridgewater	4	7	31
Newbridge	5	2	11	0	1288	1699	53.38%	20									
Inglewood	3	2	13	0	1044	1966	53.10%	12									
Calivil United	2	2	14	0	845	1599	52.85%	8									

=== 2023 Ladder ===
Team	Wins	Byes	Losses	Draws	For	Against	%	Pts	Final	Team	G	B	Pts	Team	G	B	Pts
Marong	16	2	0	0	2558	442	578.73%	64	Elimination	Bridgewater	13	8	86	Inglewood	9	10	64
Pyramid Hill	14	2	2	0	1784	954	187.00%	56	Qualifying	Pyramid Hill	16	15	111	Bears-Lagoon Serpentine	6	6	42
Bears-Lagoon Serpentine	12	2	4	0	1549	1263	122.64%	48	1st Semi	Bears-Lagoon Serpentine	17	9	111	Bridgewater	9	8	62
Inglewood	9	2	7	0	1442	1369	105.33%	36	2nd Semi	Marong	17	7	109	Pyramid Hill	12	13	85
Bridgewater	7	2	9	0	975	1290	75.58%	28	Preliminary	Pyramid Hill	16	14	110	Bears-Lagoon Serpentine	9	4	58
Mitiamo	4	2	12	0	968	1745	55.47%	16	Grand Final	Marong	8	16	64	Pyramid Hill	6	12	48
Newbridge	4	2	12	0	804	1728	46.53%	16									
Calivil United	3	2	13	0	912	1537	59.34%	12									
Maiden Gully YCW	3	2	13	0	793	1457	54.43%	12									

=== 2024 Ladder ===
Team	Wins	Byes	Losses	Draws	For	Against	%	Pts	Final	Team	G	B	Pts	Team	G	B	Pts
Marong	15	2	1	0	2102	600	350.33%	60	Elimination	Bridgewater	16	17	113	Newbridge	7	8	50
Pyramid Hill	13	2	3	0	2007	663	302.71%	52	Qualifying	Pyramid Hill	19	9	123	Bears-Lagoon Serpentine	5	5	35
Bears-Lagoon Serpentine	13	2	3	0	1887	846	223.05%	52	1st Semi	Bridgewater	12	8	80	Bears-Lagoon Serpentine	11	13	79
Bridgewater	11	2	5	0	1807	1080	167.31%	44	2nd Semi	Pyramid Hill	10	7	67	Marong	7	12	54
Newbridge	7	2	9	0	1176	1540	76.36%	28	Preliminary	Marong	21	14	140	Bridgewater	8	7	55
Calivil United	5	2	11	0	956	1685	56.74%	20	Grand Final	Marong	8	13	61	Pyramid Hill	3	7	25
Inglewood	4	2	12	0	953	1764	54.02%	16									
Maiden Gully YCW	4	2	12	0	673	1908	35.27%	16									
Mitiamo	0	2	16	0	642	2117	30.33%	0									

=== 2025 Ladder ===
Team	Wins	Byes	Losses	Draws	For	Against	%	Pts	Final	Team	G	B	Pts	Team	G	B	Pts
Marong	14	2	2	0	1748	789	221.55%	56	Elimination	Inglewood	11	18	84	Bears-Lagoon Serpentine	11	3	69
Bridgewater	14	2	2	0	1973	989	199.49%	56	Qualifying	Bridgewater	18	12	120	Pyramid Hill	11	10	76
Pyramid Hill	12	2	4	0	1841	991	185.77%	48	1st Semi	Inglewood	17	11	113	Pyramid Hill	10	11	71
Bears-Lagoon Serpentine	11	2	5	0	1604	1085	147.83%	44	2nd Semi	Bridgewater	14	8	92	Marong	12	12	84
Inglewood	9	2	7	0	1475	1123	131.34%	36	Preliminary	Marong	16	13	109	Inglewood	6	12	48
Maiden Gully YCW	5	2	10	1	939	1396	67.26%	22	Grand Final	Marong	17	14	116	Bridgewater	12	12	84
Mitiamo	3	2	13	0	863	1833	47.08%	12									
Newbridge	3	2	13	0	816	1856	43.97%	12									
Calivil United	0	2	15	1	651	1848	35.23%	2									

=== 2026 Ladder ===
Team	Wins	Byes	Losses	Draws	For	Against	%	Pts	Final	Team	G	B	Pts	Team	G	B	Pts
Bridgewater	16	0	2	0	2546	975	261.13%	64	Elimination	Inglewood	20	11	131	Maiden Gully YCW	7	4	46
Marong	16	0	2	0	2033	1053	193.07%	64	Qualifying	Pyramid Hill	12	9	81	Marong	9	15	69
Pyramid Hill	15	0	3	0	1865	1116	167.11%	60	1st Semi	Marong	10	6	66	Inglewood	7	14	56
Inglewood	11	0	7	0	1588	1198	132.55%	44	2nd Semi	Bridgewater	18	5	113	Pyramid Hill	16	15	111
Maiden Gully YCW	9	0	9	0	1404	1495	93.91%	36	Preliminary	Marong	12	14	86	Pyramid Hill	5	5	35
Macorna	9	0	9	0	1311	1551	84.53%	36	Grand Final	Bridgewater	24	10	154	Marong	8	7	55
Newbridge	6	0	12	0	1121	1583	70.81%	24									
Bears-Lagoon Serpentine	5	0	13	0	1320	1695	77.88%	20									
Calivil United	2	0	16	0	897	2067	43.40%	8									
Mitiamo	1	0	17	0	952	2304	41.32%	4									
