= Norm Reidy =

Australian rules footballer

Personal information
- Full name: Norm Reidy
- Born: 2 August 1924
- Died: 1 February 2002 (aged 77)
- Height: 175 cm (5 ft 9 in)
- Weight: 76 kg (168 lb)

Playing career^{1}
| Years | Club | Games (Goals) |
| 1946 | Fitzroy | 1 (0) |
- ^{1} Playing statistics correct to the end of 1946.

Norm Reidy (2 August 1924 – 1 February 2002) was a former Australian rules footballer who played with Fitzroy in the Victorian Football League (VFL).
