= Terry Devery =

Australian rules footballer

Personal information
- Full name: G. Terry Devery
- Born: 22 March 1938 (age 88)
- Original team: Box Hill
- Height: 170 cm (5 ft 7 in)
- Weight: 76 kg (168 lb)

Playing career^{1}
| Years | Club | Games (Goals) |
| 1959–1961 | Footscray | 31 (28) |
- ^{1} Playing statistics correct to the end of 1961.

Terry Devery (born 22 March 1938) is a former Australian rules footballer who played with Footscray in the Victorian Football League (VFL).

A rover, Devery started his senior career at Box Hill in the Victorian Football Association (VFA). He took part in Box Hill's first ever VFA finals appearance in 1956 and finished second in voting for the 1958 J. J. Liston Trophy, behind winner Keith Woolnough from Northcote. In 1958 he also represented the VFA at the Melbourne Carnival.

Devery was cleared to Footscray in 1959 and played 17 games in his debut season, missing only round seven, with a bruised thigh. In the 1960 VFL season, Devery appeared in the first seven rounds, then lost his place for the next five games after suffering an injury, but returned in round 13 and played out the season. He played only the opening round of the 1961 season. In May that year he was granted a clearance to join Collingwood, after earlier getting permission from Footscray to train with the club.

He didn't end up playing league football with Collingwood and instead made his way up to Queensland, where he captain-coached Morningside from 1962 to 1965 and made six appearances for his adopted state. Morningside made the finals in 1963 and 1964, before Devery steered the club to a premiership in 1965. As a player, he had his best season in 1962 when he was runner-up in the Grogan Medal count, to Keith Leach.

In 1966, Devery joined North Ballarat as captain-coach and remained in that role for three years.

He went to Canberra club Acton in 1971 as a player and coach.

The best and fairest award at Morningside is named after Devery and former club president Barry Kelly.
