= Alan Preen =

Australian rules footballer

- Preen during his football career

Personal information
- Full name: Alan Thomas Preen
- Born: 4 July 1935; Fremantle, Western Australia
- Died: 27 November 2016 (aged 81); Fremantle, Western Australia

Playing career^{1}
| Years | Club | Games (Goals) |
| 1953–1959 | East Fremantle | 122 (93) |
- ^{1} Playing statistics correct to the end of 1959.

Alan Thomas Preen (4 July 1935 – 27 November 2016) was a sportsman who played Australian rules football with East Fremantle in the WANFL and first-class cricket for Western Australia during the 1950s. He is a half forward flanker in East Fremantle's official 'Team of the Century'.

Preen was mainly a centre half forward but could also be used in the ruck. He played at East Fremantle between 1953 and 1959, a career which yielded 122 senior games with Best and fairest award wins in 1954 and 1958 as well as a premiership in 1957. He regularly represented Western Australia at interstate football, in all playing 15 state games, with his performance in 1958 earning him All-Australian selection.

As a cricketer, Preen was a left-arm medium-pace bowler and from his 13 first-class matches from 1953–54 to 1956–57 took 28 wickets at 34.96. His best innings bowling figures of 6/97 were taken against Victoria at the St Kilda Cricket Ground and included the wickets of Neil Harvey, Sam Loxton and Colin McDonald.

Preen died on 27 November 2016 after a long illness.
