= Tom Pelly =

Australian rules footballer

Personal information
- Full name: Tom Pelly
- Born: 1 June 1936
- Died: 23 June 2006 (aged 70)
- Original team: Western Districts
- Height: 178 cm (5 ft 10 in)
- Weight: 73 kg (161 lb)

Playing career^{1}
Years	Club	Games (Goals)
1957–1958	North Melbourne	10 (3)
- ^{1} Playing statistics correct to the end of 1958.

Tom Pelly (1 June 1936 – 23 June 2006) was an Australian rules footballer who played with North Melbourne in the Victorian Football League (VFL) during the 1950s.

Pelly was a Grogan Medal winner while with Western Districts in 1956 and before that had played for Brunswick YCW. His performance at Western Districts earned him a chance in the VFL and he left the Queensland club at the end of the year to join North Melbourne. A rover, he played eight senior games in 1957 but only two in 1958. He finished the 1958 season at Williamstown, having been cleared by North Melbourne in July, and was a member of their VFA premiership team that year and again in 1959.
