= Bob Atkinson (footballer, born 1930) =

Australian rules footballer

Personal information
- Full name: Bob Atkinson
- Born: 27 April 1930; Chroupista, Kastoria Prefecture, Greece
- Died: 13 April 2017 (aged 86); Canberra, Australia
- Original team: Port Melbourne
- Height: 168 cm (5 ft 6 in)
- Weight: 72 kg (159 lb)

Playing career^{1}
Years	Club	Games (Goals)
1952	St Kilda	3 (3)
1953–55	South Melbourne	17 (3)
Total		20 (6)
- ^{1} Playing statistics correct to the end of 1955.

Bob Atkinson (27 April 1930 – 13 April 2017) was an Australian rules footballer who played with St Kilda and South Melbourne in the Victorian Football League (VFL).

== Football ==
Recruited from Port Melbourne Football Club in 1952, he played his first match for the St Kilda First XVIII in round 14, against Melbourne, on 26 July 1952.

He transferred to South Melbourne in 1953.
