= John Harding (footballer) =

Australian rules footballer

Personal information
- Full name: John Harding
- Born: 25 May 1932
- Died: 12 October 1994 (aged 62)
- Original team: Easy Sydney
- Height: 185 cm (6 ft 1 in)
- Weight: 83 kg (183 lb)

Playing career^{1}
Years	Club	Games (Goals)
1952–54	Fitzroy	27 (7)
- ^{1} Playing statistics correct to the end of 1954.

John Harding (25 May 1932 – 12 October 1994) was a former Australian rules footballer who played with Fitzroy in the Victorian Football League (VFL).
