= Marong =

- Suburb
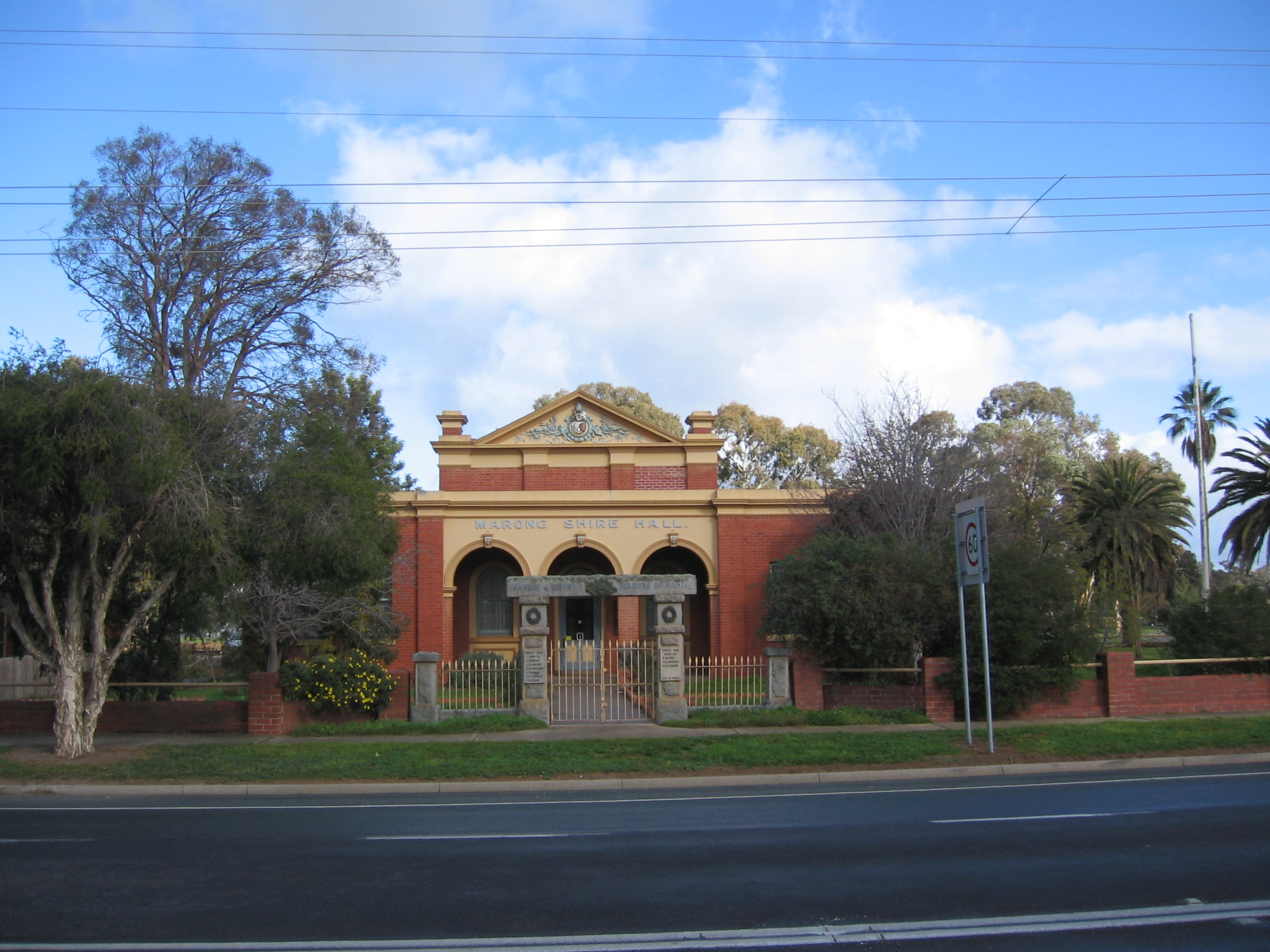
- The former Shire Hall at Marong

- Interactive map of Marong
- Coordinates: 36°44′S 144°08′E
- Country: Australia
- State: Victoria
- City: Bendigo
- LGA: City of Greater Bendigo
- Location: 157 km (98 mi) NW of Melbourne; 17 km (11 mi) W of Bendigo

Government
  - State electorates: Ripon; Bendigo West
  - Federal divisions: Bendigo; Mallee

Population
  - Total: 2,005 (2021 census)
- Postcode: 3515

Marong is a town in Victoria, Australia. At the 2021 census, Marong and the surrounding area had a population of 2,005. It is 17 kilometres (11 mi) to the west of Bendigo. Its local government area is the City of Greater Bendigo. The town is at the junction of the Calder Highway (A79) and the Calder Alternate Highway (A790).

== History ==
The name "Marong" is derived from a Djadjawurrung word for the Murray River Pine. The post office opened on 1 January 1860.

The first local government authority for Marong was the Marong Road District (an early form of single-purpose local government), which was proclaimed on 19 August 1860. Its boundary was altered twice in 1862 and on 12 December 1864 it was redesignated as a shire. It absorbed Raywood Borough in 1915, and was proclaimed a Rural City in 1990. On 2 December 1994, with the creation of Greater Bendigo City Council, it was abolished by being amalgamated with Bendigo City, Eaglehawk Borough, Huntly Shire, part of McIvor Shire, part of Metcalfe Shire and Strathfieldsaye Shire to form Greater Bendigo City.

== Present day ==
The town has an Australian rules football team competing in the Loddon Valley Football League known as the Marong Panthers.

Golfers play at the course of the Marong Golf Club on Ravenswood Road.

There is also a primary school, Marong Primary School, and a kindergarten. The Marong Family Hotel is the local pub and the Marong Swimming pool provides the surrounding districts with aquatic facilities.
