= Len Crane =

Australian rules footballer

Personal information
- Born: 7 February 1928; South Melbourne
- Died: 24 May 2006 (aged 78); Sunshine Coast
- Height: 179 cm (5 ft 10 in)
- Weight: 80 kg (176 lb)

Playing career^{1}
Years	Club	Games (Goals)
1947–1950	South Melbourne	43 (1)
1951–1957	Hawthorn	102 (1)
Total		145 (2)
- ^{1} Playing statistics correct to the end of 1957.

Len Crane (7 February 1928 – 24 May 2006) was an Australian rules footballer who played for South Melbourne and Hawthorn in the Victorian Football League (VFL).

Crane made his VFL debut in 1947 with South Melbourne and played as a half back flanker. After four seasons with South Melbourne he moved to Hawthorn for the 1951 VFL season where he was used at full back and went on to represent Victoria in interstate football in 1953 and 1954. In 1954 Crane finished equal fourth in the Brownlow Medal count. From 1958 to 1961, Porta coached Mordialloc in the Victorian Football Association.

He was the brother of footballers Jack Crane and Tom Crane.
