= Paul Dodd (footballer) =

Australian rules footballer (1937–2024)

Personal information
- Full name: Paul James Dodd
- Born: 10 September 1935
- Died: 8 September 2024 (aged 88)
- Original team: East Ballarat
- Height: 173 cm (5 ft 8 in)
- Weight: 76 kg (168 lb)
- Position: Rover

Playing career^{1}
Years	Club	Games (Goals)
1956–58, 1960–62	St Kilda	57 (51)
- ^{1} Playing statistics correct to the end of 1962.

Paul James Dodd (10 September 1937 – 8 September 2024) was an Australian rules footballer who played with St Kilda in the Victorian Football League (VFL)!. Injuries ended Dodd's career and restricted his games tally to only 57, although he did represent Victoria in interstate football a number of times.
