= Jack Brennan (Australian footballer) =

Australian rules footballer

Personal information
- Full name: Jack Brennan
- Born: 18 August 1897
- Died: 25 December 1987 (aged 90)
- Original team: Prahran Churches

Playing career^{1}
| Years | Club | Games (Goals) |
| 1917–1918 | South Melbourne | 18 (2) |
- ^{1} Playing statistics correct to the end of 1918.

Jack Brennan (18 August 1897 – 25 December 1987) was an Australian rules footballer who played for the South Melbourne Football Club in the Victorian Football League (VFL)
