= Outline of Victoria =

State of Australia

This outline of Victoria is an overview of and topical guide to various aspects of the state of Victoria:

The Flag of Victoria

The Coat of arms of Victoria

The location of Victoria in relation to the rest of Australia

Victoria, commonly abbreviated as VIC, is a state in southeastern Australia. It is the second most populous state with a population of over 7 million, and the second-smallest, with a land area of 227,444 square kilometres (87,817 sq mi), making it the most densely populated state in Australia (31.1 per km^{2}). Named in honour of Queen Victoria, Victoria was separated from New South Wales and established as a separate Crown colony in 1851, achieving responsible government in 1855.

== General reference ==
- Pronunciation: /vɪkˈtɔːriə/
- Common English name: Victoria
- Official English name: Victoria
- Postal abbreviation: VIC
- ISO 3166-2 code: AU-VIC
- Nickname(s)
  - The Garden State
  - The Education State
- Demonym(s): Victorian

== Geography of Victoria ==
Köppen climate types in Victoria

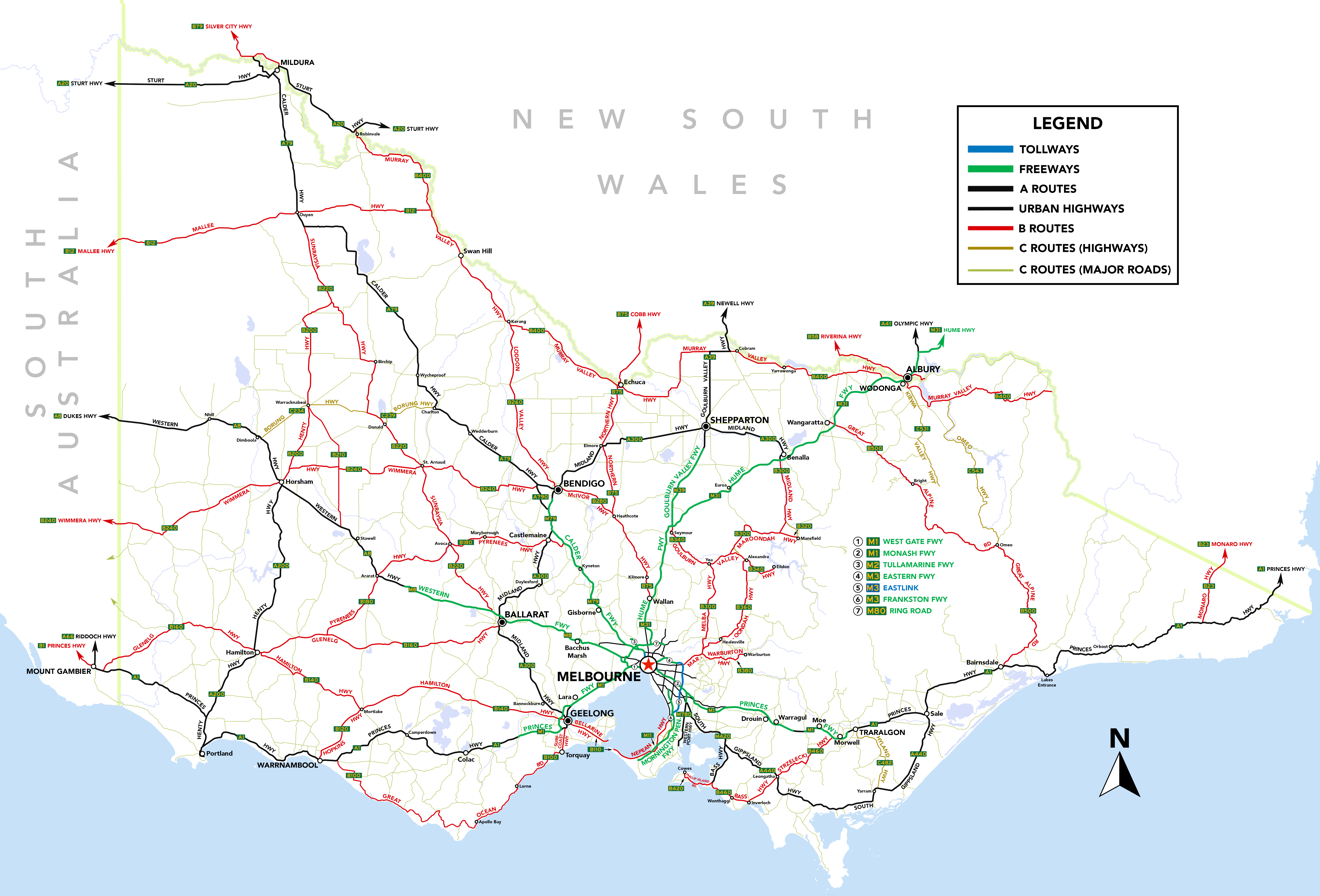
Victorian highway and road network, with significant cities and towns.

Geography of Victoria

- Victoria is: an Australian state, a federated state within Australia
- Population of Victoria: 6,865,400 (2023)
- Area of Victoria: 227,444 km^{2} (87,817 sq mi)
- Location:
  - Southern Hemisphere
  - Eastern Hemisphere
    - Oceania
      - Australasia
        - Australia
          - Australia
            - Mainland Australia
              - Eastern Australia
- Time zones:
  - Australian Eastern Standard Time (AEST) (UTC+10)
  - Summer (DST) Australian Eastern Daylight Time (AEDT) (UTC+11)

=== Environment ===
- Geology of Victoria

=== Regions ===
- Barwon South West
- Gippsland
- Grampians
- Greater Melbourne
- Hume
- Loddon Mallee

=== Counties ===
- Anglesey
- Benambra
- Bendigo
- Bogong
- Borung
- Bourke
- Buln Buln
- Croajingolong
- Dalhousie
- Dargo
- Delatite
- Dundas
- Evelyn
- Follett
- Gladstone
- Grant
- Grenville
- Gunbower
- Hampden
- Heytesbury
- Kara Kara
- Karkarooc
- Lowan
- Millewa
- Moira
- Mornington
- Normanby
- Polwarth
- Ripon
- Rodney
- Talbot
- Tambo
- Tanjil
- Tatchera
- Villiers
- Weeah
- Wonnangatta

== Government and politics of Victoria ==
- Form of government: parliamentary democracy constitutional monarchy
- List of elections in Victoria
- Local government areas of Victoria
- Parliament of Victoria

=== Electoral districts ===
- Albert Park
- Ashwood
- Bass
- Bayswater
- Bellarine
- Benambra
- Bendigo East
- Bendigo West
- Bentleigh
- Berwick
- Box Hill
- Brighton
- Broadmeadows
- Brunswick
- Bulleen
- Bundoora
- Carrum
- Caulfield
- Clarinda
- Cranbourne
- Croydon
- Dandenong
- Eildon
- Eltham
- Essendon
- Eureka
- Euroa
- Evelyn
- Footscray
- Frankston
- Geelong
- Gippsland East
- Gippsland South
- Glen Waverley
- Greenvale
- Hastings
- Hawthorn
- Ivanhoe
- Kalkallo
- Ros Spence
- Kew
- Kororoit
- Lara
- Laverton
- Lowan
- Macedon
- Malvern
- Melbourne
- Melton
- Mildura
- Mill Park
- Monbulk
- Mordialloc
- Mornington
- Morwell
- Mulgrave
- Murray Plains
- Narre Warren North
- Narre Warren South
- Nepean
- Niddrie
- Northcote
- Oakleigh
- Ovens Valley
- Pakenham
- Pascoe Vale
- Point Cook
- Polwarth
- Prahran
- Preston
- Richmond
- Ringwood
- Ripon
- Rowville
- Sandringham
- Shepparton
- South Barwon
- South-West Coast
- St Albans
- Sunbury
- Sydenham
- Tarneit
- Thomastown
- Warrandyte
- Wendouree
- Werribee
- Williamstown
- Yan Yean

== History of Victoria ==
=== Cities ===
- History of Melbourne
  - Timeline of Melbourne history

== Culture of Victoria ==
=== Sports in Victoria ===
- Australian rules football in Victoria
- Cricket in Victoria
- Rugby league in Victoria
- Rugby union in Victoria
- Soccer in Victoria

=== Symbols of Victoria ===
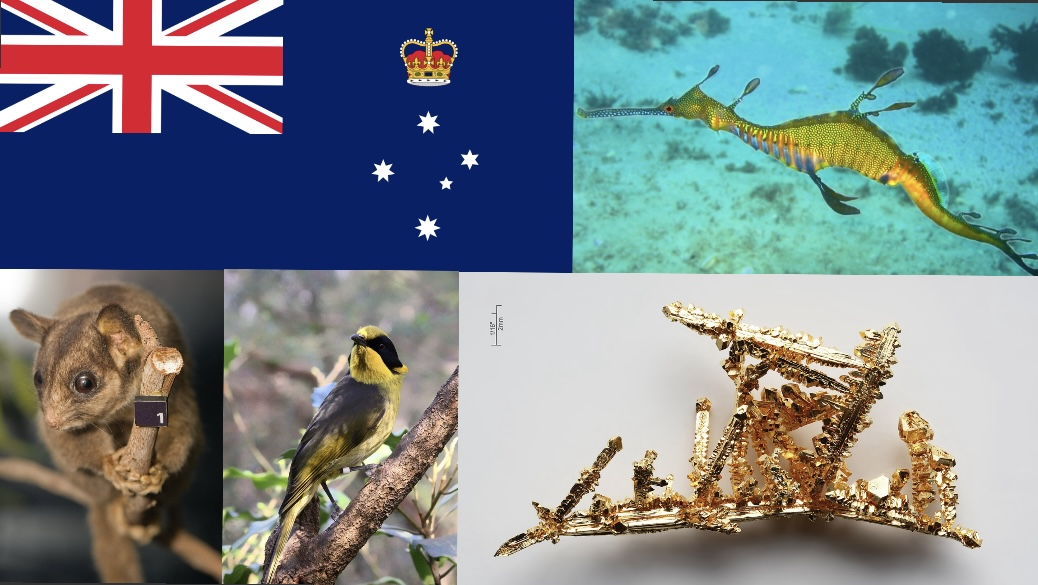
Collage of different symbols of Victoria

- Coat of arms of Victoria
- Common heath
- Flag of Victoria
- Gold
- Helmeted honeyeater
- Koolasuchus cleelandi
- Leadbeater's possum
- Navy blue
- Weedy seadragon

== Economy and Infrastructure of Victoria ==
- Economy of Victoria
- Energy in Victoria

== Education in Victoria ==
- Education in Victoria
- List of schools in Victoria
- Victorian Certificate of Education (VCE)

== See also ==
- Outline of Australia
