= List of reduplicated Australian place names =

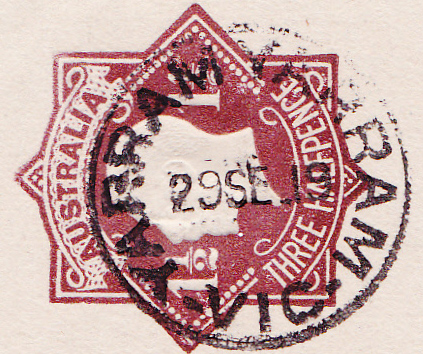
1919 Yarram Yarram postmark – the town is now Yarram

These names are examples of reduplication, a common theme in Australian toponymy, especially in names derived from Indigenous Australian languages such as Wiradjuri. Reduplication is often used as an intensifier such as "Wagga Wagga" which was originally translated as many crows but has since been retransmitted as celebration with a single use of the term Wagga meaning dance and "Tilba Tilba" many waters.

The phenomenon has been the subject of interest in popular culture, including the song by Australian folk singer Greg Champion (written by Jim Haynes and Greg Champion), Don't Call Wagga Wagga Wagga. British comedian Spike Milligan, an erstwhile resident of Woy Woy, once wrote "Woy it is called Woy Woy Oi will never know".

== Place names ==
Name of place	State or territory	Meaning and notes
Bael Bael	Victoria	A locality of the Shire of Gannawarra. It contains Lake Bael Bael and the heritage listed Bael Bael Homestead.
Balla Balla	Western Australia	An abandoned town and port for the Whim Creek Copper Mine
Ban Ban Springs	Queensland	Ban means "grass" in the local Kabi language.
Ban Ban Springs	Northern Territory	A cattle station
Banda Banda	New South Wales	A mountain in the Great Dividing Range near Kempsey
Bang Bang	Queensland	A solitary rocky hill in Shire of Carpentaria
Banka Banka Station	Northern Territory	A cattle station. 'Banka' means 'bees' in the local Aboriginal language, thus 'Banka Banka' means '(place of) many bees'.
Baw Baw	Victoria	A local government area in Victoria. The name is also applied to a mountain (Mount Baw Baw), and to a national park (Baw Baw National Park). Baw Baw is an Aboriginal word meaning "echo".
Beek Beek	Victoria	Emu. A parish in the County of Buln Buln
Beggan Beggan	New South Wales	A locality in Harden Shire and a parish in Harden County
Bet Bet	Victoria	A locality of the Shire of Central Goldfields. Bet Bet had its own local government area (Shire of Bet Bet) from 1864 to 1995.
Bindi Bindi	Western Australia	A small town in the Shire of Moora The name is Aboriginal in origin and is the word for stick or skewer on which a coat is hung. The doubling of the word is to indicate many of them.
Billa Billa	Queensland	Aboriginal word of unknown dialect meaning pool or reach of water
Bli Bli	Queensland	Named after "billai billai", Aboriginal for swamp oak.
Bom Bom	New South Wales	Small village near South Grafton
Bon Bon Reserve	South Australia	A nature reserve
Bong Bong	New South Wales	The place name is Aboriginal for "blind or a watercourse lost in a swamp" or "many watercourses; many frogs".
Bongil Bongil	New South Wales	The name Bongil Bongil is the name of a sub-group of the Gumbaingerie tribe which occupied the general area bounded by the Clarence River to the north, the Nambucca River to the south, Dorrigo to the west and the Pacific Ocean.
Book Book	New South Wales	A rural community within the local government area of the city of Wagga Wagga
Bookal-Bookal Creek	Queensland	?
Boonoo Boonoo	New South Wales	The place name means "poor country with no animals to provide food" and is Aboriginal in origin. The name is applied to a locality, a national park (Boonoo Boonoo National Park), a river (Boonoo Boonoo River) and a waterfall.
Booti Booti National Park	New South Wales	The place name means "plenty plenty" in the local Aboriginal language.
Brim Brim	Victoria	A parish of the County of Dundas
Brit Brit	Victoria	A locality of the Shire of Southern Grampians
Bruk Bruk	Victoria	A parish of the County of Dundas
Budgee Budgee	New South Wales	Budgee Budgee is a locality near Mudgee. The origin of the name is unknown, but it first appeared on old maps so is possibly a surveyor's interpretation of an aboriginal name.
Budgee Budgee	Victoria	A parish of the County of Wonnangatta
Bulla Bulla	Victoria	The original name of the township of Bulla. An Aboriginal term meaning either 'two' or 'good'.
Buln Buln	Victoria	A locality in the Shire of Baw Baw. The name is also applied to a county (County of Buln Buln) in Victoria.
Bungle Bungle Range	Western Australia	A corruption of "bundle bundle", a grass common to the Kimberley region.
Burra Burra	South Australia	Former name for the town of Burra. The name is also applied to a creek and a copper mine near the town.
Burrah Burrah	Victoria	A parish of the County of Ripon
Burrin Burrin Reserve	New South Wales	A nature reserve in south-eastern NSW
Burrum Burrum	Victoria	A parish of the County of Kara Kara
Carag Carag	Victoria	A parish of the County of Rodney
Colac Colac	Victoria	A locality of the Shire of Towong
Collum Collum	New South Wales	A locality within the Clarence Valley LGA.
Coomoo Coomoo	New South Wales	The name was derived from the original station name, which used a local Aboriginal word meaning "much water".
Cope Cope	Victoria	A locality of the Shire of Northern Grampians
Curl Curl	New South Wales	Name may be derived from Aboriginal phrase "curial curial" meaning river of life.
Cut Paw Paw	Victoria	A parish of the County of Bourke."Maribyrnong: Action in Tranquility", the history of Maribyrnong, gives the meanings of several aboriginal terms. Cut Cut Paw is a corruption of the words for "a clump of she-oaks".
Dom Dom	Victoria	A mountain in Victoria, 65 km from Melbourne
Doon Doon	New South Wales	From the Bandjalung-Yugambeh chain word 'doan doan' meaning black or dark.
Drik Drik	Victoria	An Aboriginal word for "Stoney Stoney"
Drung Drung	Victoria	A former name of locality of Drung in the Rural City of Horsham
Dum Dum	New South Wales	A locality near Uki
Durren Durren	New South Wales	A locality near Wyong, within the Central Coast Council local government area.
Elong Elong	New South Wales	A locality on the Golden Highway in New South Wales
Ganoo Ganoo	Victoria	A parish of the County of Dundas
Gatum Gatum	Victoria	A former name of locality of Gatum in the Shire of Southern Grampians and the name of a Melbourne Cup winner
Gherang Gherang	Victoria	A parish of the County of Grant
Ghin Ghin	Victoria	A locality east of Yea
Ghinni Ghinni	New South Wales	A locality east of Taree
Gil Gil	Victoria	A locality of the Shire of Buloke
Gin Gin	Queensland	The name was derived from the original station name, which used a local Aboriginal word indicating "red soil thick scrub".
Gin Gin	New South Wales	A small town within the Narromine Shire
Gingin	Western Australia	May mean either "footprint" or "place of many streams".
Gol Gol	New South Wales	Gol Gol got its name from the local Aboriginal word for 'meeting place', as recorded by the explorer Thomas Mitchell.
Gong Gong	Victoria	A locality of the City of Ballarat
Goonoo Goonoo	New South Wales	"Plenty of water". These two words are pronounced differently, as 'Gun'na-Ga'noo
Gre Gre	Victoria	A locality of the Shire of Northern Grampians
Greg Greg	New South Wales	A locality in the southern highlands of New South Wales
Grong Grong	New South Wales	"Very hot".
Guda Guda	Western Australia	A small Aboriginal community in the Wyndham-East Kimberley local government area
Gumly Gumly	New South Wales	"Place of many Frogs" Near Wagga Wagga
Gunyah Gunyah	Victoria	An earlier name of the locality of Gunyah in South Gippsland Shire
Gunyah Gunyah	Victoria	A parish of the County of Buln Buln
Hie Hie	New South Wales	See Terry Hie Hie
Jellat Jellat	New South Wales	A locality south-east of Bega in New South Wales
Jil Jil	Victoria	A locality of the Shire of Buloke
Jim Jim Falls	Northern Territory	Derived from the indigenous word andjimdjim, a type of water pandanus located near the falls.
Jimba Jimba Station	Western Australia	A cattle station, east of Carnarvon
Jingi Jingi Creek	Queensland	A creek. Jingi Jingi Creek rises on the western slope of the Great Dividing Range, in the locality of Diamondy, north-east of Jandowae. It flows south-west through Jinghi and Tuckerang to Brigalow, where it crosses the Warrego Highway and flows into the Condamine River.
Joel Joel	Victoria	A locality in the Shire of Northern Grampians
Jung Jung	Victoria	A former name of locality of Jung in the Rural City of Horsham
Kadji Kadji	Western Australia	A pastoral lease east of Morawa
Karlu Karlu	Northern Territory	Devil's Marbles
Karup Karup	Victoria	A parish of the County of Dundas
Ki Ki	South Australia	
Kin Kin	Queensland	May be derived from the local Aboriginal word for 'black ants'. or May be derived from an Aboriginal word, Kabi language, kauin kauin, a variant of kutchin indicating red, from the red soil area drained by Kin Kin Creek.
Koonung Koonung Creek	Victoria	A tributary of the Yarra River
Koort-koort-nong	Victoria	A parish of the County of Hampden
Korrak Korrak	Victoria	A parish of the County of Tatchera
Kunat Kunat	Victoria	A parish of the County of Tatchera
Kurri Kurri	New South Wales	In the Minyung language, which refers to this area, Kurri-kurri means 'the beginning, the first'.
Lal Lal	Victoria	Lal Lal is a town in Victoria
Lang Lang	Victoria	Lang Lang was formerly known as Carrington, after Lord Carrington. The town is named in honour of an early settler in region, called Lang. In the Woiwurrung language, the name Lang Lang, also spelled Laang Laang, meant "stones" or "stony". Lang Lang is also believed to mean "bush bush"; or a "clump of trees". Also see Lang Lang River and Little Lang Lang River.
Ma Ma Creek	Queensland	
Mata Mata	Northern Territory	A homeland community located in the remote coastal area of East Arnhem Land in the Northern Territory.
Mia Mia	Victoria	
Millaa Millaa	Queensland	May be derived from the local Aboriginal word for 'plenty water'. or May be derived from a corruption of "millai millai", possibly Yindinji language, indicating a fruit-bearing plant Elaeagnus latifolia.
Milly Milly	Western Australia	A pastoral lease in the Mid-West
Min Min	Queensland	A locality east of Boulia. The location where the Min Min Lights have been observed.
Mitta Mitta	Victoria	
Moona Moona Creek	New South Wales	The creek flowing into Jervis Bay that separates the towns of Huskisson and Vincentia.
Mona Mona	Queensland	a locality in the Shire of Mareeba
Mooney Mooney	New South Wales	
Morrl Morrl	Victoria	A locality of the Shire of Northern Grampians
Mullum Mullum Creek	Victoria	From the Woiwurrung language. Thought to mean "place of many big birds"
Mundi Mundi	New South Wales	A cattle station in the outback
Murra Murra	Queensland	A property in the Shire of Paroo.
Murrin Murrin	Western Australia	An abandoned gold and copper mining town and siding on the Malcolm-Laverton railway line.
Nap Nap Marra	Victoria	A locality of the Shire of Wellington
Nar Nar Goon	Victoria	A town in Gippsland
Nareeb Nareeb	Victoria	A former name of the locality of Nareeb in the Shire of Moyne
Nerrin Nerrin	Victoria	A locality of the Rural City of Ararat
Ni Ni	Victoria	A former locality of the Shire of Hindmarsh
Nowa Nowa	Victoria	Town in East Gippsland
Nug Nug	Victoria	A locality of Alpine Shire
Obi Obi	Queensland	Believed to be a perpetuation of the personal name of a prominent Aboriginal, known variously as Ubi Ubi, Wubi Wubi or Obi Obi.
Pandie Pandie Station	South Australia	A cattle station
Paraparap	Northern Territory	Now simply Parap, a Darwin suburb
Paw Paw	Victoria	
Pendyk Pendyk	Victoria	A parish of the County of Dundas
Perrit Perrit	Victoria	A parish of the County of Tatchera
Pom Pom	Victoria	A parish of the County of Villiers
Pura Pura	Victoria	A locality of the Shire of Moyne
Tabby Tabby Island	Queensland	Derived from a corruption of Bundjalung language, Ngaraangbal language, word dhube dhube, indicating crab place or shell place.
Terip Terip	Victoria	A locality of the Shire of Murrindindi
Terrick Terrick	Victoria	A locality of the Shire of Loddon
Terrick Terrick National Park	Victoria	
Terry Hie Hie	New South Wales	
Tilba Tilba	New South Wales	Said to be a Thawa Aboriginal term for 'many waters'.
Tucki Tucki	New South Wales	A locality of the City of Lismore
Vite Vite	Victoria	A locality of the Corangamite Shire
Wagga Wagga	New South Wales	'Wagga wagga' is probably a Wiradjuri term for 'many crows'; with wagga, an onomatopoeic word, imitating the sound of the crow's call. 'Waggan', for one type of crow and 'waggura', for another have been recorded; also: reeling (a sick man or a dizzy man); to dance, slide or grind.
Wal Wal	Victoria	A locality of the Shire of Northern Grampians
Walla Walla	New South Wales	Probably Wiradjuri in origin, but no meaning has been verified. Possibly from wallawalla for rain.
Walla Walla	Victoria	A parish of the County of Ripon
Wallan Wallan	Victoria	The place name Wallan comes from the local word walen-walen, meaning round. It refers to the many waterholes in the area
Wangi Wangi	New South Wales	The word Wangi has been translated variously as water, night owl or dark green tree so that Wangi Wangi would mean place of much water, many night owls or many dark green trees. Early settlers and fishermen used the word to mean peninsula and Point Wolstoncroft (in the locality of Gwandalan) was called "Little Wangi". Captain Dangar's 1826 sketch of Lake Macquarie marked Wangi Point as "Wonde Wonde". There is no explanation of the marked difference between spelling and pronunciation.
Warra Warra	Victoria	A parish of the County of Borung
Wat Wat	Victoria	A parish of the County of Croajingolong
Wee Wee Rup	Victoria	A locality of the Shire of Gannawarra
Whian Whian	New South Wales	A locality of the City of Lismore
Will Will Rook	Victoria	A parish of the County of Bourke
Wonga Wonga	Victoria	An earlier name of the locality of Wonga in South Gippsland Shire
Wood Wood	Victoria	A locality of the Rural City of Swan Hill
Wool Wool	Victoria	A locality of the Colac Otway Shire
Woy Woy	New South Wales	Said to be an Awabakal Aboriginal term for 'deep water' or 'lagoon'
Wujal Wujal	Queensland	Aboriginal community in Far North Queensland
Wuk Wuk	Victoria	A locality of the Shire of East Gippsland
Wurruk Wurruk	Victoria	A parish of the County of Tanjil
Wyn Wyn	Victoria	A former locality of the Rural City of Horsham
Yabba Yabba	Victoria	A parish of the County of Moira
Yagga Yagga	Western Australia	An Aboriginal community near Halls Creek
Yan Yan Gurt	Victoria	A locality of the Surf Coast Shire
Yanac A Yanac	Victoria	A former name of a locality of Yanac in the Shire of Hindmarsh
Yarram Yarram	Victoria	The former name of Yarram
Yeo Yeo	New South Wales	(pron. yo-yo) A district between Wallendbeen and Stockinbingal where Don Bradman first lived. Shell of the schoolhouse most significant remains.

== See also ==
- Reduplication for general linguistic analysis
- List of reduplicated place names
- List of reduplicated New Zealand place names
- List of Australian place names of Aboriginal origin
- List of tautological place names
- Postcodes
