= County of Gladstone =

Coordinates: 36°25′S 143°37′E

Gladstone
- Cadastral division
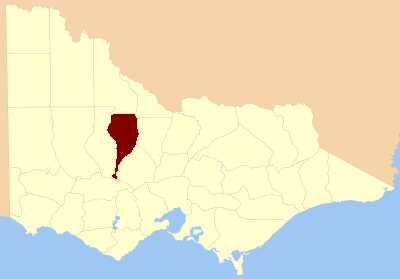
- Location in Victoria
- Country: Australia
- State: Victoria
- Established: 14 January 1870

Area
  - Total: 4,667 km^{2} (1,802 sq mi)
Lands administrative divisions around Gladstone
Tatchera	Tatchera	Gunbower
Kara Kara	Gladstone	Bendigo
Ripon	Ripon	Talbot

The County of Gladstone is one of the 37 counties of Victoria which are part of the cadastral divisions of Australia, used for land titles. It is located between the Avoca River in the west and Loddon River and Bet Bet Creek in the east. The county was proclaimed in 1870.

== Parishes ==
Parishes include:

- Archdale, Victoria
- Barp, Victoria
- Barrakee, Victoria
- Bealiba
- Berrimal, Victoria
- Bet Bet, Victoria
- Borung, Victoria
- Brenanah, Victoria
- Buckrabanyule, Victoria
- Charlton East, Victoria
- Coonooer East, Victoria
- Dunolly, Victoria
- Glenalbyn, Victoria
- Glenloth, Victoria
- Glenmona, Victoria
- Gowar, Victoria
- Inglewood, Victoria
- Kangderaar, Victoria
- Kingower, Victoria
- Kinypanial, Victoria
- Kooreh, Victoria
- Kooroc, Victoria
- Korong, Victoria
- Kurraca, Victoria
- Kurting, Victoria
- Moliagul, Victoria
- Mysia, Victoria
- Narrewillock, Victoria
- Natteyallock, Victoria
- Painswick, Victoria
- Powlett, Victoria
- Rathscar, Victoria
- Salisbury West, Victoria
- Tarnagulla, Victoria
- Tchuterr, Victoria
- Terrappee, Victoria
- Waanyarra, Victoria
- Wareek, Victoria
- Wedderburne, Victoria
- Wehla, Victoria
- Woosang, Victoria
- Wychitella, Victoria
- Yalong, Victoria
- Yalong South, Victoria
- Yeungroon, Victoria
