= Sylvaterre =

- Town
- Coordinates: 36°03′57″S 144°14′14″E
- Country: Australia
- State: Victoria
- LGA: Shire of Loddon

Government
  - State electorate: Murray Plains
  - Federal division: Mallee

Population
  - Total: 22 (2021 census)
- Postcode: 3575
Localities around Sylvaterre
Pyramid Hill	Pyramid Hill	Pyramid Hill
Pyramid Hill	Sylvaterre	Jungaburra
Pyramid Hill	Terrick Terrick	Terrick Terrick

Sylvaterre is a locality in the Shire of Loddon, Victoria, Australia. At the 2021 census, Sylvaterre had a population of 22.

== History ==
In the late 19th century, Sylvaterre was part of the Terrick West district.
