= Grenville County =

Grenville County may refer to:

- Grenville County, Ontario, Canada
- County of Grenville, Victoria, Australia
