= Dundas County =

Dundas County may refer to:

- Dundas County, Ontario
- Dundas County, Victoria
