= Vern Daniel =

Australian rules footballer

Personal information
- Full name: Vernon William Laurence Daniel
- Born: 30 May 1887; Mitiamo, Victoria
- Died: 27 January 1969 (aged 81); Mudgee, New South Wales
- Original team: Maffra
- Height: 191 cm (6 ft 3 in)
- Weight: 83.5 kg (184 lb)

Playing career^{1}
Years	Club	Games (Goals)
1909, 1912	Melbourne	5 (1)
- ^{1} Playing statistics correct to the end of 1912.

Vernon William Laurence Daniel (30 May 1887 – 27 January 1969) was an Australian rules footballer who played with Melbourne in the Victorian Football League (VFL).
