= Pine Grove, Victoria =

Locality in South Australia

Pine Grove Victoria
- Coordinates: 36.22°S 144.41°E
- Population: 40 (SAL 2021)
- Postcode(s): 3573
- Location: 210 km (130 mi) north of Melbourne; 35 km (22 mi) southwest of Echuca
- LGA(s): Shire of Campaspe
- State electorate(s): Murray Plains
- Federal division(s): Nicholls
Localities around Pine Grove:
	Terrick Terrick East
Mitiamo	Pine Grove	Kotta
	Tennyson	Lockington

Pine Grove is a locality in northern Victoria, Australia. It is in the Shire of Campaspe, southwest of the shire seat of Echuca.

Pine Grove was a pastoral run until the 1870s. Around then, it was subdivided for selection for closer farming. Pine Grove school opened in 1875, and a Methodist church in 1894.
