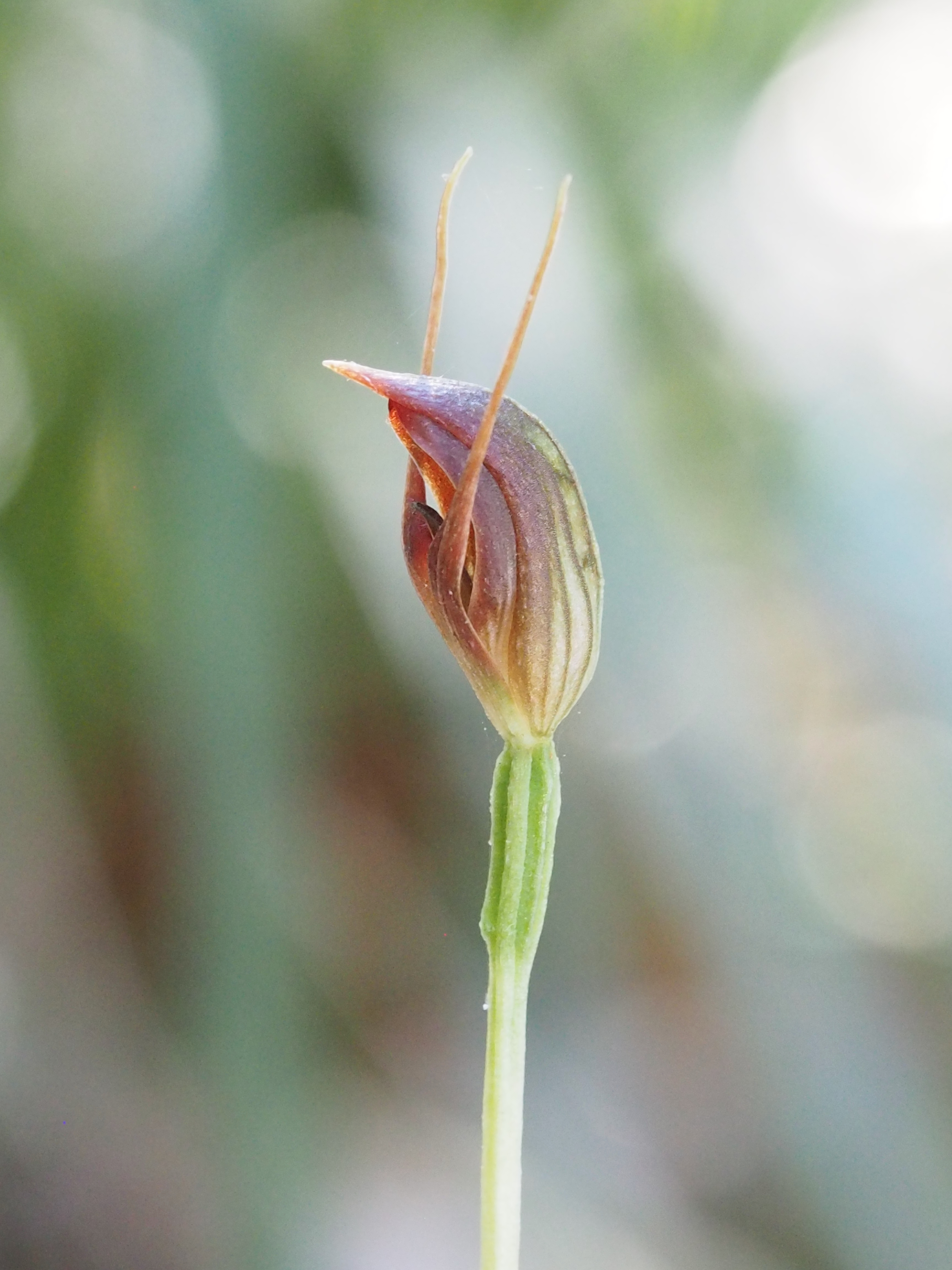
- In Bongil Bongil National Park

Conservation status
- Least Concern (IUCN 3.1)

Scientific classification
- Kingdom: Plantae
- Clade: Embryophytes
- Clade: Tracheophytes
- Clade: Spermatophytes
- Clade: Angiosperms
- Clade: Monocots
- Order: Asparagales
- Family: Orchidaceae
- Subfamily: Orchidoideae
- Tribe: Cranichideae
- Genus: Pterostylis
- Species: P. erecta

Binomial name
- Pterostylis erecta T.E.Hunt

= Pterostylis erecta =

Upright maroonhood

Species of orchid

Pterostylis erecta, commonly known as upright maroonhood, is a species of orchid endemic to eastern Australia. Flowering plants have a rosette of four to seven stalked, dark green, crinkled leaves and a greenish to reddish-brown flower with a gap between the petals and lateral sepals. It occurs in New South Wales and south-eastern Queensland.

== Description ==
Pterostylis erecta is a terrestrial, perennial, deciduous, herb with an underground tuber. Flowering plants have a rosette of between four and seven stalked, dark green, crinkled leaves, each leaf 15–50 mm long and 10–25 mm wide. A single flower 18–22 mm long and 5–7 mm wide is borne on a spike 150–350 mm high. The flowers are greenish to reddish brown or dark chocolate brown. The dorsal sepal and petals are fused, forming a hood or "galea" over the column but the dorsal sepal is longer than the petals and has a sharp point on its end. There is a wide gap between the petals and the lateral sepals and the sinus between the lateral sepals has a central notch and bulges slightly forward. The labellum is 6–7 mm long, about 2 mm wide, brown, blunt and just visible above the sinus. Flowering occurs from August to September.

== Taxonomy and naming ==
Pterostylis erecta was first formally described in 1958 by Trevor Edgar Hunt from a specimen collected near Samford in Queensland. The description was published in Proceedings of the Royal Society of Queensland. The specific epithet (erecta) is a Latin word meaning "upright".

== Distribution and habitat ==
Upright maroonhood grows mainly in coastal and near coastal forest north from Moruya in New South Wales to south-eastern Queensland.
