= Mitiamo =

Town in northern Victoria, Australia

- Town
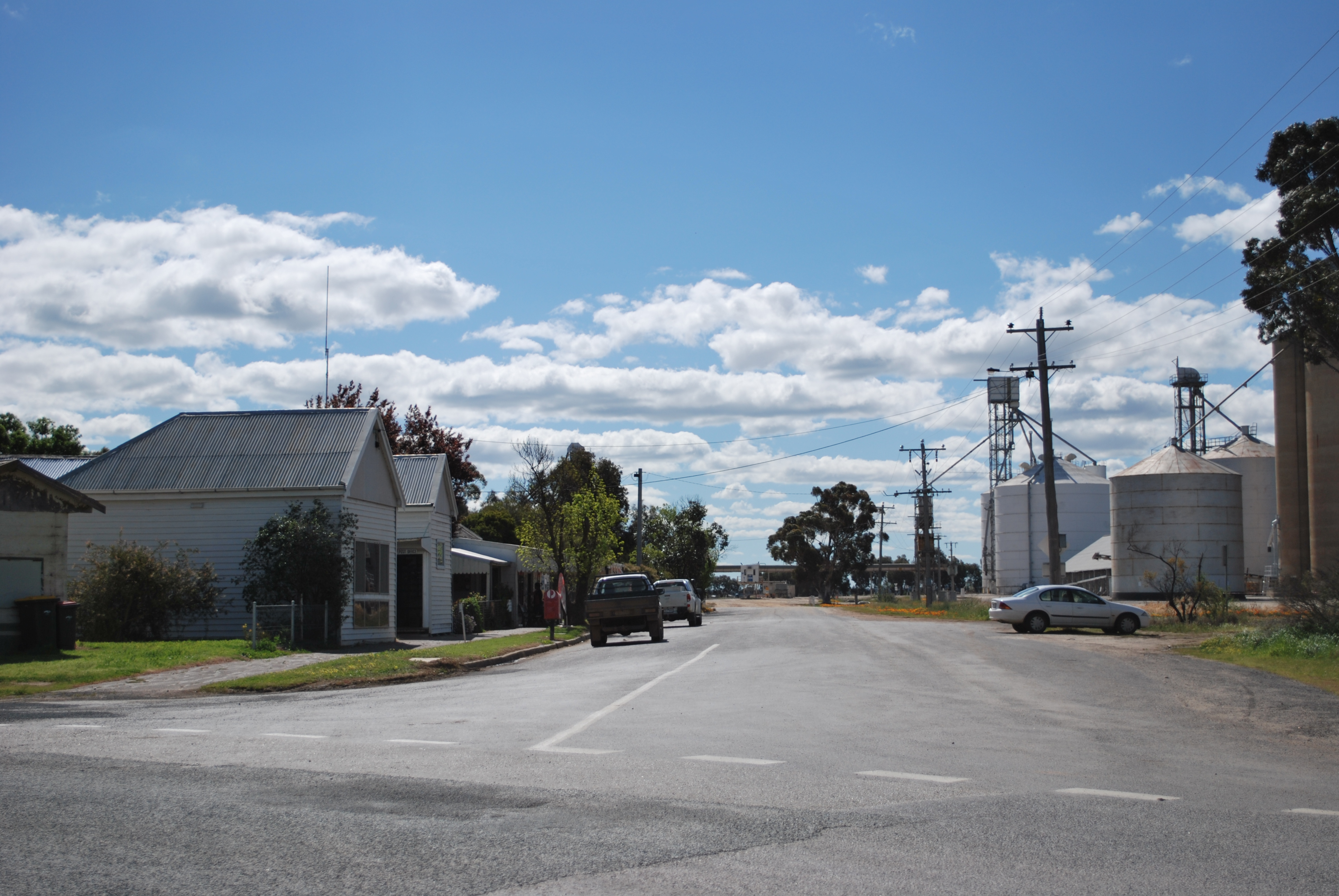
- Joffre Street, Mitiamo with the post office and general store on the left

- Coordinates: 36°12′36″S 144°14′00″E
- Country: Australia
- State: Victoria
- LGA: Shire of Loddon
- Location: 222 km (138 mi) N of Melbourne; 67 km (42 mi) N of Bendigo; 55 km (34 mi) W of Echuca; 23 km (14 mi) SE of Pyramid Hill

Government
  - State electorate: Murray Plains
  - Federal divisions: Mallee; Nicholls

Population
  - Total: 116 (2021 census)
- Postcode: 3573
Localities around Mitiamo
Mologa	Terrick Terrick	Terrick Terrick East
	Mitiamo	Pine Grove
Calivil	Prairie	Tennyson

Mitiamo is a town in northern Victoria, Australia. It is in the Shire of Loddon, 222 kilometres (138 mi) north of the state capital, Melbourne. At the 2021 census, Mitiamo had a population of 116.

Mitiamo Post Office opened on 13 April 1875. Mitiamo station opened in 1883 with the arrival of the line from Raywood that was soon extended to Kerang.

The town has an Australian Rules football and netball club competing in the Loddon Valley Football Netball League. Former Mitiamo player Ken Sheldon played in three day premierships and one night premiership for Carlton in the VFL. He later coached St Kilda.

Golfers play at the Mitiamo Golf Club on Mitiamo Forest Road.

Terrick Terrick National Park is 4 kilometres (2 mi) north of the town.
