= Hampden County =

Hampden County may refer to:

- County of Hampden, Victoria, Australia
- Hampden County, Massachusetts, United States
