= County of Normanby =

Coordinates: 37°59′S 141°40′E

Normanby
- Cadastral division
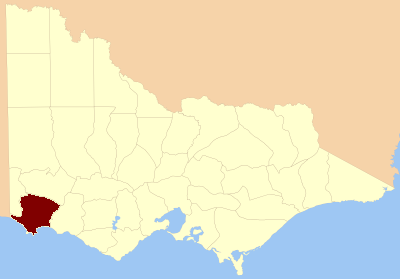
- Location in Victoria
- Country: Australia
- State: Victoria
- Established: 22 June 1853

Area
  - Total: 5,214 km^{2} (2,013 sq mi)
Lands administrative divisions around Normanby
Follett	Dundas	Villiers
Follett	Normanby	Villiers
Bass Strait	Bass Strait	Bass Strait

The County of Normanby is one of the 37 counties of Victoria which are part of the cadastral divisions of Australia, used for land titles. The county is in south-western Victoria, primarily bounded by the Glenelg River in the west and the Eumeralla River in the east, Grange Burn and the Wannon River in the north, and by Bass Strait to the south. The county was formally proclaimed in 1853, but it was known by name since at least 1941 and with known boundaries since at least the 1849 proclamation of Follett County and Dundas County.

== Cadastral History Prior To Proclamation ==
Normanby evolved from the Portland Bay District which was proclaimed on July 1st, 1840 by the Governor of New South Wales, George Gipps, as one half of the division of the Port Phillip district. These districts came to be referred to as the counties of Bourke and Grant by locals in relation to land sales, however they were not proclaimed as such and the specific borders were left undefined with the reasoning that formalisation should wait until surveying of the area was more thorough.

When the township of Geelong started growing, Normanby was created as a third unproclaimed county as a result of a split from Grant county. Following the appointment of multiple commissioners with apparently overlapping jurisdictions at the start of 1841, the division line between the two was clarified and by 1846 the county names were appearing in the New South Wales census (though adding to the confusion "Portland Bay" and Normanby were listed separately), though the county and its boundaries were still not proclaimed. This is reconfirmed in 1849 and 1851 where Normanby is assumed to be a county with known borders (that match the borders that will eventually be proclaimed) as it is used to define the legislative council districts and in the proclamation of the counties of Follet and Dundas.

== Proclamation And Description ==
Normanby was formally proclaimed on June 9th, 1853 by Lieutenant Governor William Lonsdale on the advice of the Colonial Treasury as a restatement of all the existing county boundary definitions in Victoria, both to correct references to New South Wales and to resolve the absence of proclaimed boundaries for older counties (including Normanby).

The proclamation defines the county as follows:

Normanby, containing about 1920 square miles. Bounded on the north by the Grange Burn and Wannon river, until the latter joins the Glenelg river ; on the west by the Glenelg river until it reaches the sea ; on the south by the sea shore to the mouth of the Shaw river ; and on the east by the western branch of the Shaw river to its source; thence is line northerly to the source of the Swamp creek ; by that creek to where it empties itself into the Mount Napier swamp ; and thence by a line due north six miles fifteen chains to the Grange Burn; including the Lawrence and Lady Julia Percy’s islands.

This definition creates an anomaly with the border where the Glenelg River loops into South Australia, meaning that the western border of the county is cut off by the South Australian border as well as the Glenelg River.

The western (main) branch of the Shaw River later came to be known as the Eumeralla River.

The proclamation was published in the Victorian Government Gazette on June 22nd, 1853, formally establishing the county on that date.

== Traditional Ownership ==
The Gunditjarma people are the traditional owners of the land in Normanby county.

The land was stolen by the Henty Brothers, who squatted on the land from 1834 onward, initially at a whaling outpost and then on a number of agricultural settlements. This led to the Convincing Ground massacre and the Eumerella Wars, both of which remain significant intergenerational traumas for the indigenous people of the area.

== Current Day ==
Portland, the oldest European settlement in Victoria, remains the largest town in the county with a population of just over 10,000 people as at the 2021 census. Heywood (in the rural centre of the county) and Hamilton (which straddles the Grange Burn so sits in both Normanby and Dundas county) are the other significant towns.

Significant industries in the area include agriculture, forestry, fishing, and industrial manufacturing (in particular the Portland Aluminium Smelter).

== Parishes ==
=== Parishes contained entirely within the county of Normanby ===
- Annya
- Ardonachie
- Audley
- Balrook
- Bessiebelle
- Bolwarra
- Bramburra
- Branxholme
- Byaduk
- Byambynee
- Cobboboonee
- Condah
- Croxton West
- Curracurt
- Digby
- Drik Drik
- Drumborg
- Dunmore
- Eumeralla
- Glenaulin
- Gorae
- Grassdale
- Greenhills
- Hamilton South
- Heywood
- Homerton
- Hotspur
- Kentbruck
- Killara
- Merino
- Mocamboro
- Monivae
- Mouzie
- Murndal
- Myamyn
- Myaring
- Napier
- Narrawong
- Portland
- Sandford
- Tahara
- Tarragal
- Trewalla
- Tyrendarra
- Warrabkook
- Warrain
- Wataepoolan
- Weecurra
- Weerangourt
- Winyayung
- Yatchew West
- Yulecart

=== Parishes shared between Normanby and neighbouring counties ===
==== Dartmoor ====
Dartmoor is split over the Glenelg River between Normanby and Follet on both sides of where it meets the Crawford River near the town of Dartmoor. The significant area (over 29km^{2}) was reserved for the township of Dartmoor for expected expansion, however only limited expansion ever took place.

==== Glenelg ====
Glenelg is split over the Glenelg River between Normanby and Follett. The split exists as a result of the Glenelg River looping back into Victoria from South Australia, meaning that the parish is split by accident rather than by design.

==== Macarthur ====
Macarthur is split over the Eumeralla River between Normanby and Villiers just before it meets Breakfast Creek near the village of Macarthur. The small section of land was reserved for subdivision for expected expansion of the village, however this expansion never occurred.

==== Yatmerone ====
Yatemore is split over the Eumeralla River between Normanby and Villiers at the parish's easternmost edge. The small section of land near the headwaters of the Eumeralla River is bounded by a length of Macarthur-Penshurst road instead of the river. No reason is known for the anomaly.

== See also ==
- List of reduplicated Australian place names
