= Ban Ban Springs Station =

Pastoral lease in the Northern Territory

Coordinates: 13.3775°S 131.5051°E

Location in the Northern Territory

Ban Ban Springs Station is a pastoral lease that operates as a cattle station in the Northern Territory of Australia.

== Location ==
It is situated about 46 kilometres (29 mi) south east of Adelaide River and 125 kilometres (78 mi) south east of Darwin. The property shares a boundary with other pastoral leases including Mount Ringwood and McKinlay River to the north, Bridge Creek to the west, Douglas to the south and Mary River to the East. The Stuart Highway is found 25 kilometres (16 mi) from the homestead and cuts through the eastern side of the property. Several watercourses flow through the property including Hayes Creek, McCallum Creek and the McKinlay river. The Margaret River also cuts through the property and the Mary River forms the eastern boundary.

== Description ==
Currently occupying an area of 1,873 square kilometres (723 sq mi) with a carrying capacity of approximately 12,000 head of cattle, it has a typical annual rainfall of 1,200 millimetres (47 in) to 1,600 millimetres (63 in).

The land systems are a mixture of plains interspersed with creek beds bordered by flood out country and boulder strewn ridges. The plains vary from sediment rich soils to gravelly areas with the ridges mostly being gently undulating with areas of steep shale and dolerite. Areas of black soil can be found around the extensive floodplains for the Margaret, Mary and Mackinley rivers and the springs and other low-lying areas. The soils tend to be nutrient poor. The plains are typically open savanna woodlands which contain the usual overstorey of trees and shrubs over kangaroo grass, but with annual and perennial sorghums.

== History ==
The station was first registered in the 1880s.

Robert and Phoebe Farrar acquired the property in 1925, drove a mob of cattle in and chose a site for a homestead. In 1935 Phoebe Farrar was charged by a bull and gored while branding cattle. It took two days for a doctor to reach the station and she was later transported to Darwin for an operation on her broken hip. She survived and returned home soon after where she continued riding until she and Robert retired in about 1942 and turned the property over to their son, Harry.

In 1948 Norman and Winifred Whatley and their three sons arrived at the station from England. They soon took over a neighbouring property, Hayes Creek Station (now Douglas Station), and established a store and inn along the Stuart Highway. The family remained in the area until 1959.

Tom Starr managed the property from 1984 to 1998.

In 1998 Ban Ban springs was owned by Gunter Gschwenter, the Tyrolian born entrepreneur who owned the Britz rental business.

The property was placed on the market in 2010, and in 2014 the property was still on the market along with at least 15 others.

== See also ==
- List of ranches and stations
- List of reduplicated Australian place names
