= Lockington, Victoria =

Lockington Victoria
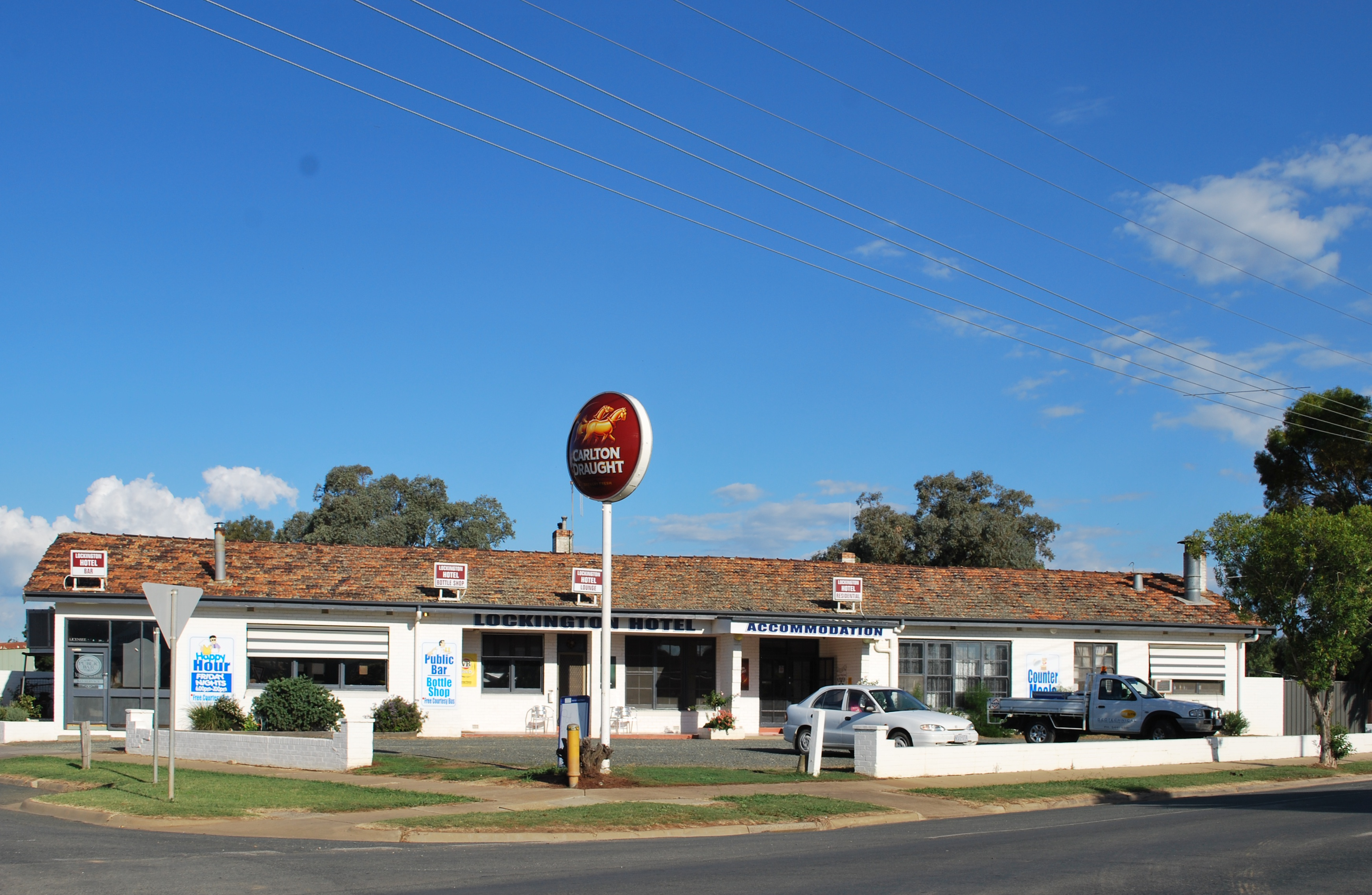
- Lockington Hotel

- Coordinates: 36°16′0″S 144°32′0″E
- Population: 850 (2021 census)
- Postcode(s): 3563
- Location: 198 km (123 mi) from Melbourne; 75 km (47 mi) from Bendigo; 35 km (22 mi) from Echuca; 25 km (16 mi) from Rochester
- LGA(s): Shire of Campaspe
- State electorate(s): Murray Plains
- Federal division(s): Nicholls
Localities around Lockington:
Pine Grove	Kotta	Bamawm Extension
	Lockington	Bamawm
Tennyson	Diggora	Diggora

Lockington is a town in northern Victoria, Australia in the Shire of Campaspe local government area, 198 kilometres north of the state capital, Melbourne. At the 2021 census, Lockington had a population of 850.

== History ==
For over 26,000 years, the Dja Dja Wurrung, Taungurung and Yorta Yorta people had made the area around Lockington their home. Prior to early settlement, these groups were the primary custodians of the land, maintaining it whilst also practising their culture upon it.

The first trace of European settlement can be traced back to the 1840s when it was owned by squatters under lease-hold tenure. At the time the whole area surrounding the present location of Lockington, an area made up of approximately 42,000 hectares, was known as Pine Grove and was owned by John Hunter Patterson. This land would go on to be sub-divided into East and West in 1864. The East was owned by Myles Patterson, who went on to sell it to Hugh and Robert John Glass in 1867. The East went on to switch ownership two more times, first going to Adam Burness in 1867 and then to W.J. Clarke in 1871. The West part of the division in 1864 was owned by W.H. and J.H Robertson, who went on to sell it to Blackwood and Ibbotson in 1867. By 1876 it was owned by J.H. Wheeler.

With the discovery of gold and the Victorian Gold Rush occurring in the 1850s, many people came to Pine Grove in hopes of finding their fortune. However with the gold rush subsiding in the 1860s, unemployment within the area rose drastically leading to multiple requests by locals to the state government to allow for farming. With the approval for farming being granted, there was another influx of people into Pine Grove in 1873. This in turn also led to the majority of Aboriginal tribes around the area to disappear. 3 years later the Lockington Post Office was opened on 2 May 1876 as originally being called Pannoobamawm.

With the expansion of farming in the area, challenges around water supply would commonly be present, despite the creation of dams which in turn led to wells becoming an important source of water. As the area continued to grow, new schools were established but were moved around depending on the number of children in the specific districts. After the severe drought of the 1890s in Victoria, there were multiple attempts to create irrigation schemes for the state. Whilst construction of the first system would not begin until 1902, the Victorian government had made it one of their top priorities, passing legislation in 1904 to help support the constructions. Despite this effort it wouldn't be until 1911 that Pine Grove would get its first irrigation system.

In a few years after the construction of the irrigation system, the Elmore to Cohuna railway was completed in 1915 to help facilitate economic growth in Pine Grove. With the train station being named Bamawm and the post office having the name Pannoobamawm, rail authorities requested a list of names to be submitted to them to help create an official name for the township. The locals of the area eventually suggested the town be named after William Lockington, a prominent Jesuit priest in the early 20th century. With no other places holding such a name, Lockington was officially gazetted in 1921.

== The Town today ==
Lockington has one pub, a school, three churches and a small range of shops. The district features an extensive network of irrigation channels and these are said to feature the giant "Loch Ness yabby".

Together with its neighbouring township Bamawm, Lockington has an Australian Rules football team (Lockington Bamawm United) competing in the Heathcote District Football League which won consecutive premierships in 2011/2012/2013/2014, led by coach Kahl Oliver, captained by Nathan O’Brien.

Golfers play at the course of the Lockington Golf Club on Middleton Road.

== Notable residents ==
- Travis Fimmel, actor, star of TV series Vikings and film Warcraft
- Brad McEwan, former presenter of Sports Tonight and sports presenter on 10 News First Melbourne.
- Sharelle McMahon, former Melbourne Vixens and Australian netballer.
