= Bamawm =

Bamawm Victoria
- Coordinates: 36°15′0″S 144°35′0″E
- Population: 527 (2011 census)
- Postcode(s): 3561
- Location: 215 km (134 mi) N of Melbourne; 75 km (47 mi) NE of Bendigo; 30 km (19 mi) SE of Echuca
- LGA(s): Shire of Campaspe
- State electorate(s): Murray Plains
- Federal division(s): Nicholls

Bamawm is a locality in the Australian state of Victoria. The district is located in the Campaspe Shire local government area, 215 kilometres (134 mi) north of the state capital, Melbourne. At the 2011 census, Bawmawm and the surrounding area had a population of 527. Bamawm shares a cricket club with Lockington, their home ground is the Bamawm sports stadium.

Bamawm shares an Australian rules football team with nearby Lockington—the Lockington Bamawm United Football Club—competing in the Heathcote District Football League.
