= Bael Bael =

Bael Bael Victoria
- Coordinates: 35°40′34″S 143°43′18″E
- Postcode(s): 3579
- LGA(s): Shire of Gannawarra
- State electorate(s): Murray Plains
- Federal division(s): Mallee

Bael Bael is a locality located in the Shire of Gannawarra of Victoria. It contains Lake Bael Bael and the heritage listed Bael Bael Homestead.

== See also ==
- List of reduplicated Australian place names
