= County of Polwarth =

Coordinates: 38°30′S 143°30′E

Polwarth Victoria
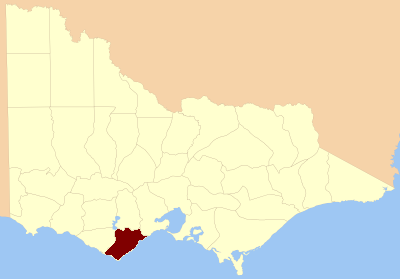
- Location in Victoria
- Established: 10 January 1849
- Area: 3,173 km^{2} (1,225.1 sq mi)
Lands administrative divisions around Polwarth:
Hampden	Grenville	Grant
Heytesbury	Polwarth	Bass Strait
Bass Strait	Bass Strait	Bass Strait

The County of Polwarth is one of the 37 counties of Victoria which are part of the cadastral divisions of Australia, used for land titles. The county is in the Western District of Victoria and includes the Cape Otway area, bounded by the Gellibrand River in the west and the Anglesea River and Barwon River in the east, in the north by a line from Winchelsea, through Colac to Larpent, and by Bass Strait to the south. The largest town is Colac. The county was proclaimed in 1849.

== Parishes ==
Parishes within the county:

- Aire
- Angahook
- Bambra
- Barongarook
- Barramunga
- Barwon Downs
- Barwongemoong
- Birregurra (part in the County of Grenville)
- Boonah
- Colac
- Elliminyt
- Gerangamete
- Irrewarra
- Irrewillipe
- Kaanglang
- Krambruk
- La Trobe (part in the County of Heytesbury)
- Lorne
- Moomowroong
- Moorbanool
- Murroon
- Nalangil
- Natte Murrang
- Newlingrook
- Olangolah
- Otway
- Pirron Yaloak
- Wangerrip
- Warrion (part in the County of Grenville)
- Weeaproinah
- Wensleydale
- Whoorel
- Wongarra
- Wyelangta
- Yan Yan Gourt
- Yaugher
- Yeo
