= County of Follett =

Coordinates: 37°30′S 141°15′E

Follett
- Cadastral division
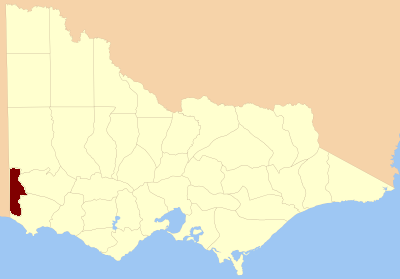
- Location in Victoria
- Country: Australia
- State: Victoria
- Established: 10 January 1849

Area
  - Total: 2,857 km^{2} (1,103 sq mi)
Lands administrative divisions around Follett
Robe (SA)	Lowan	Dundas
Grey (SA)	Follett	Normanby
Bass Strait	Normanby	Normanby

The County of Follett is one of the 37 counties of Victoria which are part of the cadastral divisions of Australia, used for land titles. It comprises a strip in the far southwest of the state bounded by the Glenelg River to the east, South Australia to the west and Elderslie Creek to the north beyond Casterton.

== Proclamation And Description ==
Follett was proclaimed as a county on December 29, 1848 by the Governor of New South Wales, Charles Augustus Fitzroy as one of thirty-one new counties, the majority of which were in territory later ceded by New South Wales to become part of Victoria.

The proclamation defines the county boundary as follows:

County of Follett, containing about 1,040 square miles. Bounded on the west by the (141) one hundred and forty-first meridian, being the line dividing the Colony of New South Wales from South Australia ; on the south and east by the Glenelg river upwards to the confluence with Power’s Creek; and on the north-east and north by Power’s Creek to its source ; thence a line westward to the head of Mosquito Creek ; and by that Creek to the boundary line.

This definition created two anomalies in the boundary:

- The Glenelg River loops into South Australia and back into Victoria, making Follett the only county without an island that is non-contiguous.
- The meridian that defined the (then) New South Wales-South Australian border was incorrectly surveyed, resulting in the border being slightly to the west of the 141st meridian. The issue of the border was later resolved by the Privy Council in the South Australia-Victoria border dispute. This resulted in the addition of approximately 63 square miles of territory to the county.

The proclamation was published in the Port Philip Government Gazette on January 10, 1849, which marks the formal establishment date of the county.

The description of the county was altered in an 1853 proclamation that restated or formally stated the boundaries of all the counties in Victoria. The only change from the original definition was to replace "New South Wales" with "Victoria".

== Traditional Ownership ==
The formally recognised traditional owners of the land in this area are the Gunditjmara People.

The land was stolen from the traditional owners on the arrival of the Henty Brothers, who established agricultural settlements in the area from 1834 onward. This followed the earlier Convincing Ground massacre where residents of a whaling station established by the Henty Brothers slaughtered an estimated 200 indigenous Australians over a dispute regarding a whale carcass. This incident continues to be a cause of significant intergenerational pain to the local indigenous people.

Following settlement the Gunditjmara people fought extensively to maintain or reclaim ownership of the land in Eumeralla Wars, which occurred primarily in the counties of Follett and Normanby, ultimately resulting in the colonists establishing permanent claim over the land.

== Current Day ==
Follett is a sparsely populated rural county with the largest town being Casterton, which straddles the border between Follett and the neighbouring county of Dundas.

The main industries of the region are timber production and sheep grazing. Although exact figures are not recorded by county the Glenelg local government area statistics are indicative of the area.

== Parishes ==
=== Parishes contained entirely within the county of Follett ===
- Ardno
- Bahgallah
- Byjuke
- Dergholm
- Drajurk
- Kaladbro
- Kanawinka
- Kinkella
- Langkoop
- Mageppa
- Malanganee
- Mumbannar
- Nagwarry
- Nangeela
- Palpara
- Roseneath
- Tooloy
- Tullich
- Wanwin
- Werrikoo
- Wilkin

=== Parishes shared between Follett and neighbouring counties ===
==== Bogalara ====
Bogalara is split over the Powers Creek between Follet and Lowan. The split is likely due to a surveying error during the original charting of the county. The original county boundary can be seen at an inflection point in the northern border of the parish, which is where Powers Creek officially runs to on county maps, however the creek on the 1904 survey map runs halfway along the northern extension of the border. There is an unnamed western branch of Powers Creek that runs very close to the inflection point, but this is not visible on parish maps. The parish itself follows a track to a junction at the corner of the parish and was put in place as a result of lands already being subdivided over the county border.

==== Casterton ====
Casterton is split over the Glenelg river between Follett and Dundas. The split exists to facilitate the township of Casterton falling within the same Parish.

==== Dartmoor ====
Dartmoor is split over the Glenelg river between Follett and Normanby. The split exists to facilitate the township of Dartmoor falling within the same Parish.

==== Glenelg ====
Glenelg is split over the Glenelg river between Follet and Normanby. The split exists as a result of the Glenelg River looping back into Victoria from South Australia, meaning that the parish is split by accident rather than design.
