= County of Dargo =

Coordinates: 37°30′S 147°30′E

Dargo Victoria
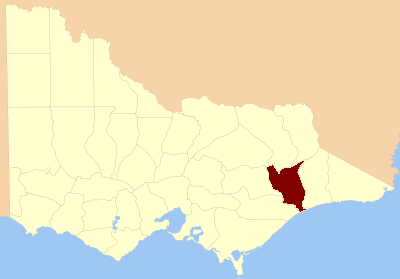
- Location in Victoria
- Established: 24 February 1871
- Area: 5,272 km^{2} (2,035.5 sq mi)
Lands administrative divisions around Dargo:
Delatite	Bogong	Benambra
Wonnangatta	Dargo	Tambo
Tanjil	Bass Strait	Bass Strait

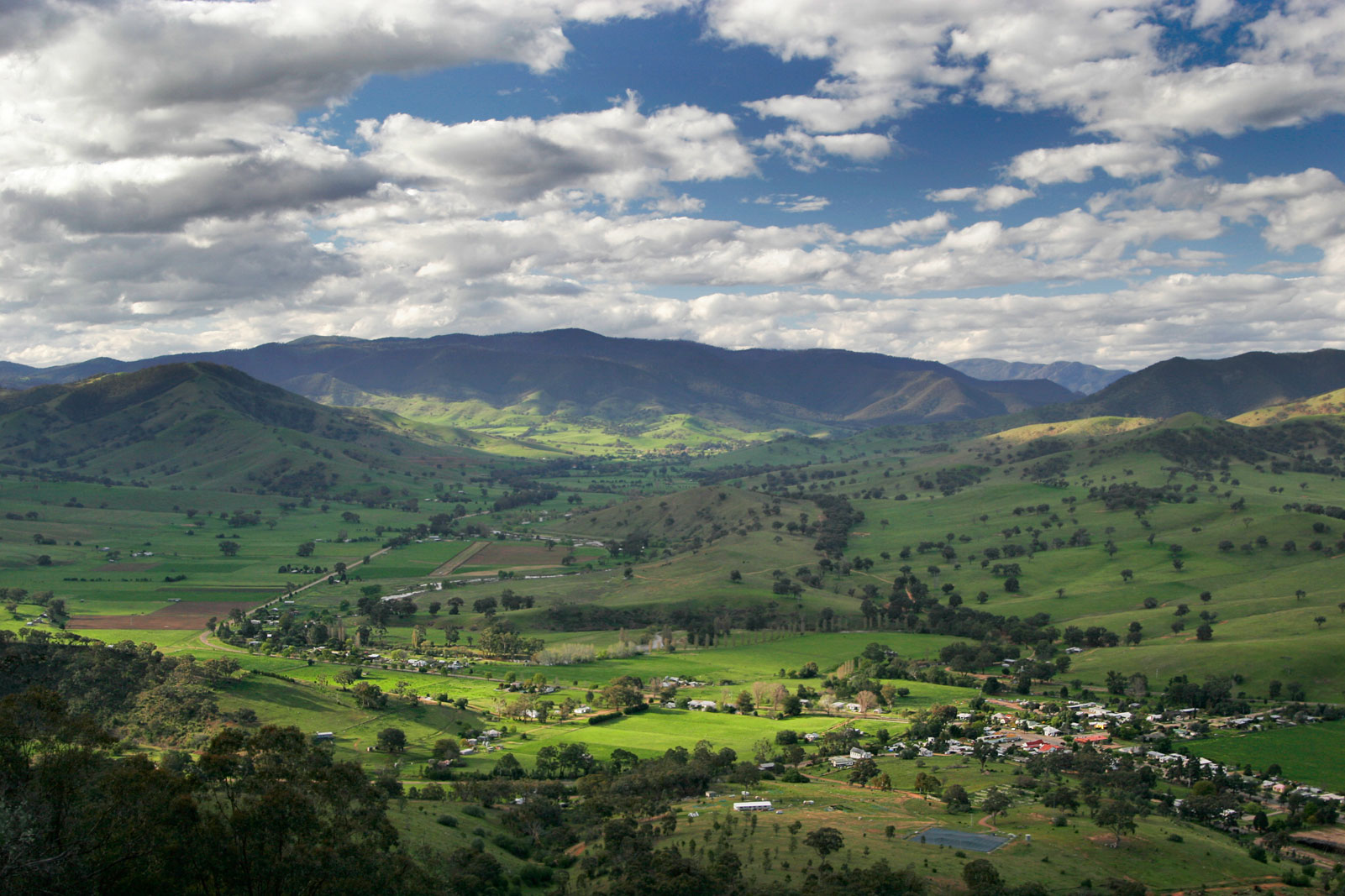
Swifts Creek is located near the eastern edge of the county, along the Tambo River

The County of Dargo is one of the 37 counties of Victoria which are part of the cadastral divisions of Australia, used for land titles. It is located in Gippsland, between the Mitchell River in the west and the Tambo River in the east. Lake King is on the southern edge. It was gazetted in 1871. Earlier maps show the area as being part of a proposed County of Abinger.

== Parishes ==
Parishes include:

- Angora, Victoria
- Barroworn, Victoria
- Bemboka, Victoria
- Binnican, Victoria
- Birregun, Victoria
- Boonderoot, Victoria
- Broadlands, Victoria
- Bulgaback, Victoria
- Bullumwaal, Victoria
- Bumberrah, Victoria
- Caarneek, Victoria
- Carneek, Victoria
- Cooma, Victoria
- Cowa, Victoria
- Dargo, Victoria
- Doodwuk, Victoria
- Graham, Victoria
- Guttamurra, Victoria
- Jirnkee, Victoria
- Kalk Kalk, Victoria
- Kianeek, Victoria
- Koomberar, Victoria
- Kooroon, Victoria
- Moonip, Victoria
- Morekana, Victoria
- Mullawye, Victoria
- Nungatta, Victoria
- Nurong, Victoria
- Onyim, Victoria
- Quag-Munjie, Victoria
- Sarsfield, Victoria
- Tabberabbera, Victoria
- Tambo, Victoria
- Tarkeeth, Victoria
- Terlite-Munjie, Victoria
- Thornley, Victoria
- Tongio-Munjie West, Victoria
- Tyirra, Victoria
- Wamba, Victoria
- Wentworth, Victoria
- Wongungarra, Victoria
- Wuk Wuk, Victoria
- Wy-Yung, Victoria
- Yambulla, Victoria
- Yertoo, Victoria
- Yonduk, Victoria
