= County of Karkarooc =

Administrative area in Victoria, Australia

Karkarooc
- Cadastral division
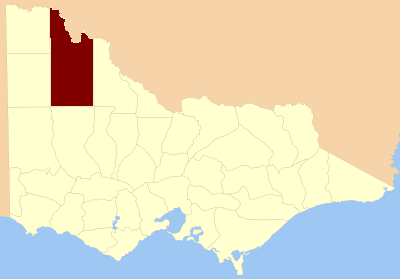
- Location in Victoria
- Country: Australia
- State: Victoria
- Established: 24 February 1871

Area
  - Total: 15,372 km^{2} (5,935 sq mi)
Lands administrative divisions around Karkarooc
Millewa	Wentworth (NSW)	Taila (NSW)
Weeah	Karkarooc	Tatchera
Lowan	Borung	Kara Kara

The County of Karkarooc is one of the 37 counties of Victoria which are part of the cadastral divisions of Australia, used for land titles. It is located to the south of the Murray River, with its western boundary at 142°E, and its eastern boundary at 143°E. Its southern boundary is on the 36°S parallel. Lake Tyrrell is located near the eastern boundary. Mildura is located near the north-western edge.

== Parishes ==
Parishes include:

- Annuello, Victoria
- Ballapur, Victoria
- Baring, Victoria
- Baring North, Victoria
- Beulah, Victoria
- Bimbourie, Victoria
- Bitchigal, Victoria
- Bitterang, Victoria
- Boigbeat, Victoria
- Boolungal, Victoria
- Boorong, Victoria
- Boorongie, Victoria
- Boulka, Victoria
- Bourka, Victoria
- Brockie, Victoria
- Bumbang, Victoria
- Burnell, Victoria
- Burupga, Victoria
- Byanga, Victoria
- Cambacanya, Victoria
- Cantala, Victoria
- Carool, Victoria
- Carori, Victoria
- Carwarp, Victoria
- Carwarp West, Victoria
- Chiprick, Victoria
- Cocamba, Victoria
- Colignan, Victoria
- Cronomby, Victoria
- Curyo, Victoria
- Dattuck, Victoria
- Dennying, Victoria
- Dering, Victoria
- Eureka, Victoria
- Gaalanungah, Victoria
- Galaquil, Victoria
- Gama, Victoria
- Gayfield, Victoria
- Geera, Victoria
- Gerahmin, Victoria
- Ginap, Victoria
- Gingimrick, Victoria
- Ginquam, Victoria
- Gorya, Victoria
- Goyura, Victoria
- Gutchu, Victoria
- Jil Jil, Victoria
- Kallery, Victoria
- Karadoc, Victoria
- Karyrie, Victoria
- Kenmare, Victoria
- Kia, Victoria
- Kinabulla, Victoria
- Koimbo, Victoria
- Konardin, Victoria
- Kulkyne, Victoria
- Kulwin, Victoria
- Kurdgweechee, Victoria
- Larundel, Victoria
- Lianiduck, Victoria
- Liparoo, Victoria
- Manangatang, Victoria
- Margooya, Victoria
- Marlbed, Victoria
- Merbein, Victoria
- Mildura, Victoria
- Minapre, Victoria
- Mittyack, Victoria
- Mittyan, Victoria
- Moah, Victoria
- Moortworra, Victoria
- Mournpoul, Victoria
- Myall, Victoria
- Nandemarriman, Victoria
- Nenandie, Victoria
- Nowingi, Victoria
- Nulkwyne, Victoria
- Nurnurnemal, Victoria
- Nyallo, Victoria
- Nypo, Victoria
- Ouyen, Victoria
- Paignie, Victoria
- Patchewollock, Victoria
- Patchewollock North, Victoria
- Pier-Millan, Victoria
- Pirro, Victoria
- Pullut, Victoria
- Raak, Victoria
- Tiega, Victoria
- Timberoo, Victoria
- Toltol, Victoria
- Towma, Victoria
- Tungie, Victoria
- Tyenna, Victoria
- Tyrrell, Victoria
- Wagant, Victoria
- Walpamunda, Victoria
- Walpeup, Victoria
- Wandown, Victoria
- Watchupga, Victoria
- Wathe, Victoria
- Wemen, Victoria
- Whirily, Victoria
- Wiall, Victoria
- Wilhelmina, Victoria
- Willangie, Victoria
- Winnambool, Victoria
- Wirmbirchip, Victoria
- Wirmbool, Victoria
- Wirrbibial, Victoria
- Woornack, Victoria
- Wortongie, Victoria
- Wymlet, Victoria
- Wyperfeld, Victoria
- Yaapeet, Victoria
- Yallum, Victoria
- Yatpool, Victoria
- Yelwell, Victoria
