= County of Weeah =

Weeah Victoria
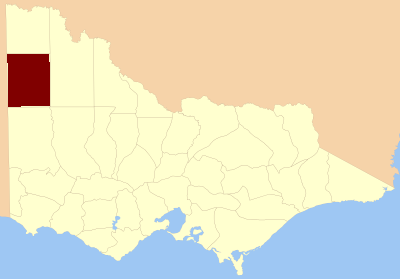
- Location in Victoria
- Established: 24 February 1871
- Area: 10,370 km^{2} (4,003.9 sq mi)
Lands administrative divisions around Weeah:
Alfred (SA)	Millewa	Karkarooc
Chandos (SA)	Weeah	Karkarooc
Buckingham (SA)	Lowan	Borung

The County of Weeah is one of the 37 counties of Victoria which are part of the cadastral divisions of Australia, used for land titles. It is located south of Mildura, with the South Australian border to the west. This border was originally intended to be at the 141st meridian of longitude, but because of the South Australia-Victoria border dispute it is several miles to the west of it. The northern boundary of the county is at 35°S, and the eastern at 142°E. Its southern boundary is on the 36°S meridian. The county was proclaimed in 1871 together with the other counties of the Wimmera Land District.

== Parishes ==
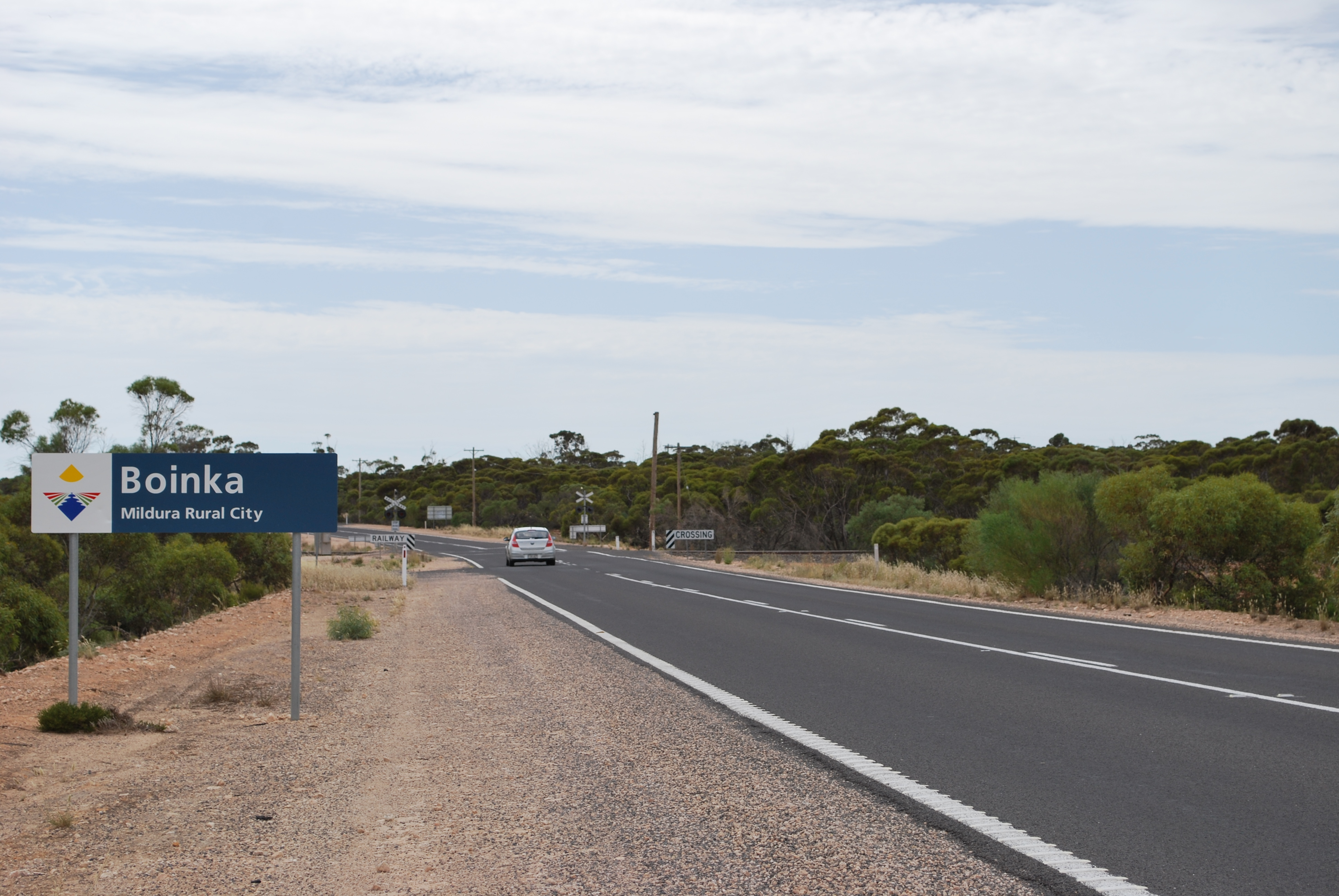
Boinka town entry sign

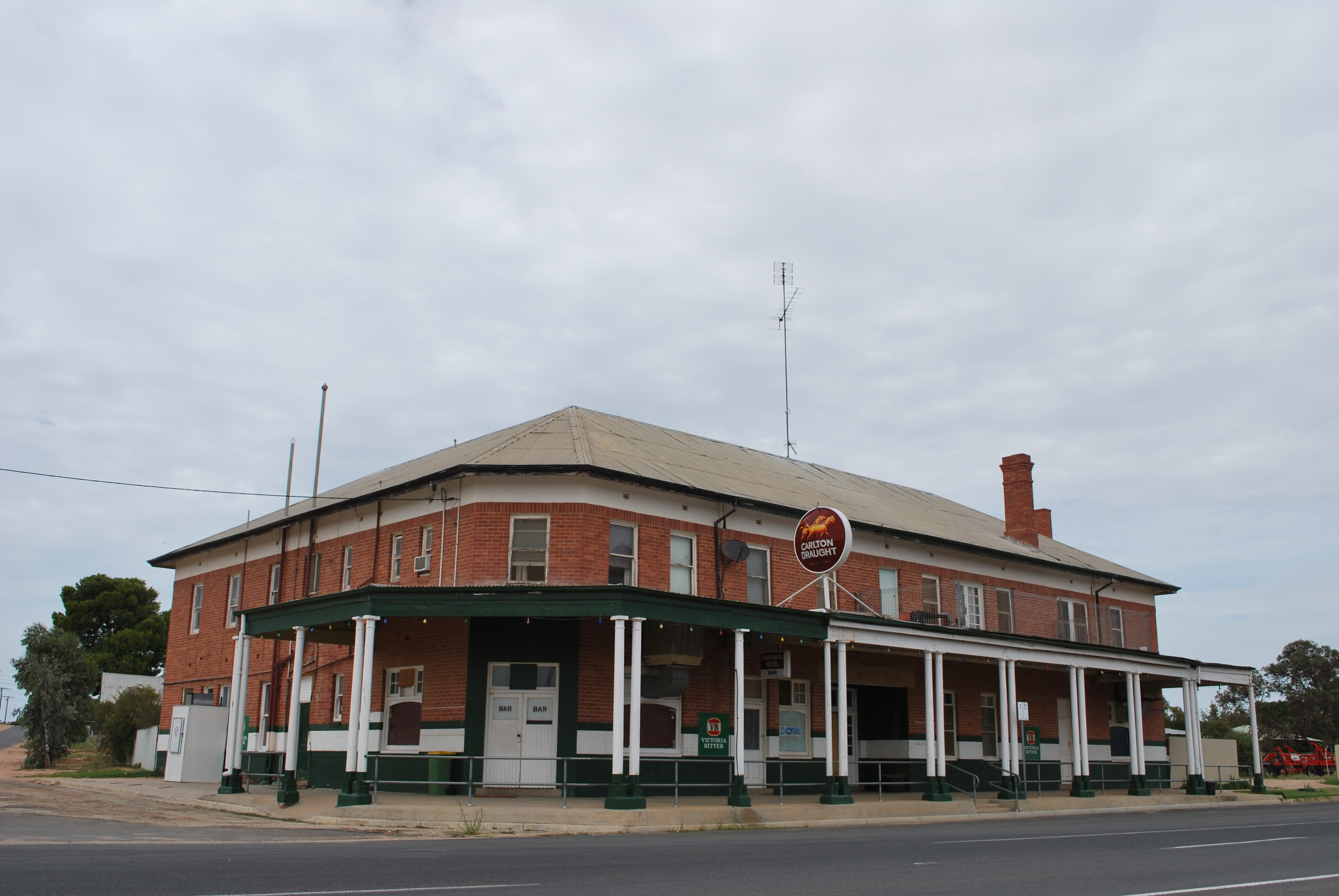
Underbool Hotel

- Albacutya
- Boinka
- Bunurouk
- Burr
- Carina
- Conga Wonga
- Danyo
- Duddo
- Gunamalary
- Kattyoong
- Kurnbrunin
- Mamengoroock
- Manpy
- Mulcra
- Nyang
- Pallarang
- Pigick
- Rainbow
- Tutye
- Tyalla
- Tyamoonya
- Underbool
- Wallowa
- Wennga
- Werrap
- Woatwoara
- Worooa

== See also ==
- List of localities in Victoria
