= Jungaburra =

- Town
- Coordinates: 36°03′31″S 144°16′57″E
- Country: Australia
- State: Victoria
- LGA: Shire of Loddon

Government
  - State electorate: Murray Plains
  - Federal division: Mallee

Population
  - Total: 0 (SAL 2016)
- Postcode: 3575

Jungaburra is a locality in the Shire of Loddon, Victoria, Australia. The population of Jungaburra was too low to be recorded at the 2021 census.
