= County of Millewa =

Millewa
- Cadastral division
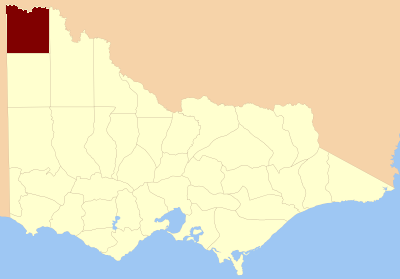
- Location in Victoria
- Country: Australia
- State: Victoria
- Established: 24 February 1871

Area
  - Total: 9,251 km^{2} (3,572 sq mi)
Lands administrative divisions around Millewa
Hamley (SA)	Tara (NSW)	Wentworth (NSW)
Alfred (SA)	Millewa	Karkarooc
Chandos (SA)	Weeah	Karkarooc

The County of Millewa is one of the 37 counties of Victoria which are part of the cadastral divisions of Australia, used for land titles. It is located to the south of the Murray River, at the north-western corner of Victoria, with the South Australian border to the west. This border was originally intended to be at the 141st meridian of longitude, but because of the South Australia-Victoria border dispute it is several miles to the west of it. The southern boundary of the county is at 35°S, and the eastern at 142°E. The name is also used for the region.

== Parishes ==
Parishes include:

- Mullroo
- Warina
- Woolwoola
- Yelta
