= County of Tatchera =

Tatchera
- Cadastral division
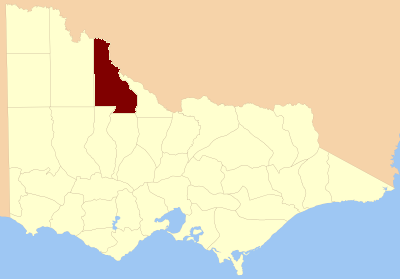
- Location in Victoria
- Country: Australia
- State: Victoria
- Established: 24 February 1871

Area
  - Total: 8,648 km^{2} (3,339 sq mi)
Lands administrative divisions around Tatchera
Karkarooc	Caira (NSW)	Wakool (NSW)
Karkarooc	Tatchera	Gunbower
Borung	Kara Kara	Gladstone

The County of Tatchera is one of the 37 counties of Victoria which are part of the cadastral divisions of Australia, used for land titles. It is located to the south of the Murray River, and to the south west of Swan Hill, with its western boundary at 143°E, and part of the southern boundary at 36°S.

== Parishes ==
Parishes include:

- Bael Bael, Victoria
- Benjeroop, Victoria
- Berriwillock, Victoria
- Boga, Victoria
- Boort, Victoria
- Budgerum East, Victoria
- Budgerum West, Victoria
- Burra, Victoria
- Cannie, Victoria
- Carapugna, Victoria
- Castle Donnington, Victoria
- Chillingollah, Victoria
- Chinangin, Victoria
- Coonimur, Victoria
- Cooroopajerrup, Victoria
- Dartagook, Victoria
- Gnarwee, Victoria
- Gredgwin, Victoria
- Jeruk, Victoria
- Kalpienung, Victoria
- Kaneira, Victoria
- Kooem, Victoria
- Koorangie, Victoria
- Koorkahb, Victoria
- Koro-Ganeit, Victoria
- Korrak Korrak, Victoria
- Kunat Kunat, Victoria
- Lalbert, Victoria
- Leaghur, Victoria
- Marmal, Victoria
- Meatian, Victoria
- Meering, Victoria
- Meering West, Victoria
- Meran, Victoria
- Mirkoo, Victoria
- Mumbel, Victoria
- Murnungin, Victoria
- Narrung, Victoria
- Ninveunook, Victoria
- Nowie, Victoria
- Nullawil, Victoria
- Nyrraby, Victoria
- Pental Island, Victoria
- Perrit Perrit, Victoria
- Piangil, Victoria
- Piangil West, Victoria
- Pines, Victoria
- Polisbet, Victoria
- Quambatook, Victoria
- Talgitcha, Victoria
- Tittybong, Victoria
- Toort, Victoria
- Towan, Victoria
- Towaninny, Victoria
- Turoar, Victoria
- Tyntynder, Victoria
- Tyntynder North, Victoria
- Tyntynder West, Victoria
- Ultima, Victoria
- Waitchie, Victoria
- Wakool, Victoria
- Wandown, Victoria
- Wangie, Victoria
- Wewin, Victoria
- Woorinen, Victoria
- Yungiera, Victoria
