= Kurting =

- Town
- Coordinates: 36°32′31″S 143°48′52″E
- Country: Australia
- State: Victoria
- LGA: Shire of Loddon

Government
  - State electorate: Ripon
  - Federal division: Mallee

Population
  - Total: 61 (2021 census)
- Postcode: 3517

Kurting is a locality in the Shire of Loddon, Victoria, Australia. At the 2021 census, Kurting had a population of 61.
