= County of Heytesbury =

Coordinates: 38°30′S 143°00′E

Heytesbury
- Cadastral division
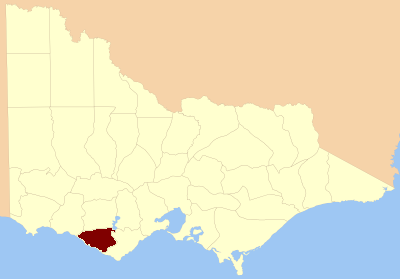
- Location in Victoria
- Country: Australia
- State: Victoria
- Established: 10 January 1849

Area
  - Total: 2,383 km^{2} (920 sq mi)
Lands administrative divisions around Heytesbury
Villiers	Hampden	Grenville
Bass Strait	Heytesbury	Polwarth
Bass Strait	Bass Strait	Polwarth

The County of Heytesbury is one of the 37 counties of Victoria which are part of the cadastral divisions of Australia, used for land titles. The county is in the Western District of Victoria bounded by the Gellibrand River in the east and the Hopkins River in the west. In the north, the county was bounded approximately by the existing road, now the Princes Highway. Larger towns include Camperdown and Cobden. The county was proclaimed in 1849.

== Parishes ==
Parishes within the county:

- Brucknell
- Carpendeit
- Cooirejong
- Coradjil
- Ecklin
- Elingamite
- Jancourt
- Laang
- La Trobe (part in the County of Polwarth)
- Mepunga
- Narrawaturk
- Nirranda
- Nullwarre
- Paaratte
- Panmure (part in the County of Hampden)
- Pomborneit
- Purrumbete South
- Tallangatta
- Tandarook
- Timboon
- Waarre
- Wiridjil
