= Bongil Bongil National Park =

National park in New South Wales, Australia

- IUCN category II (national park)
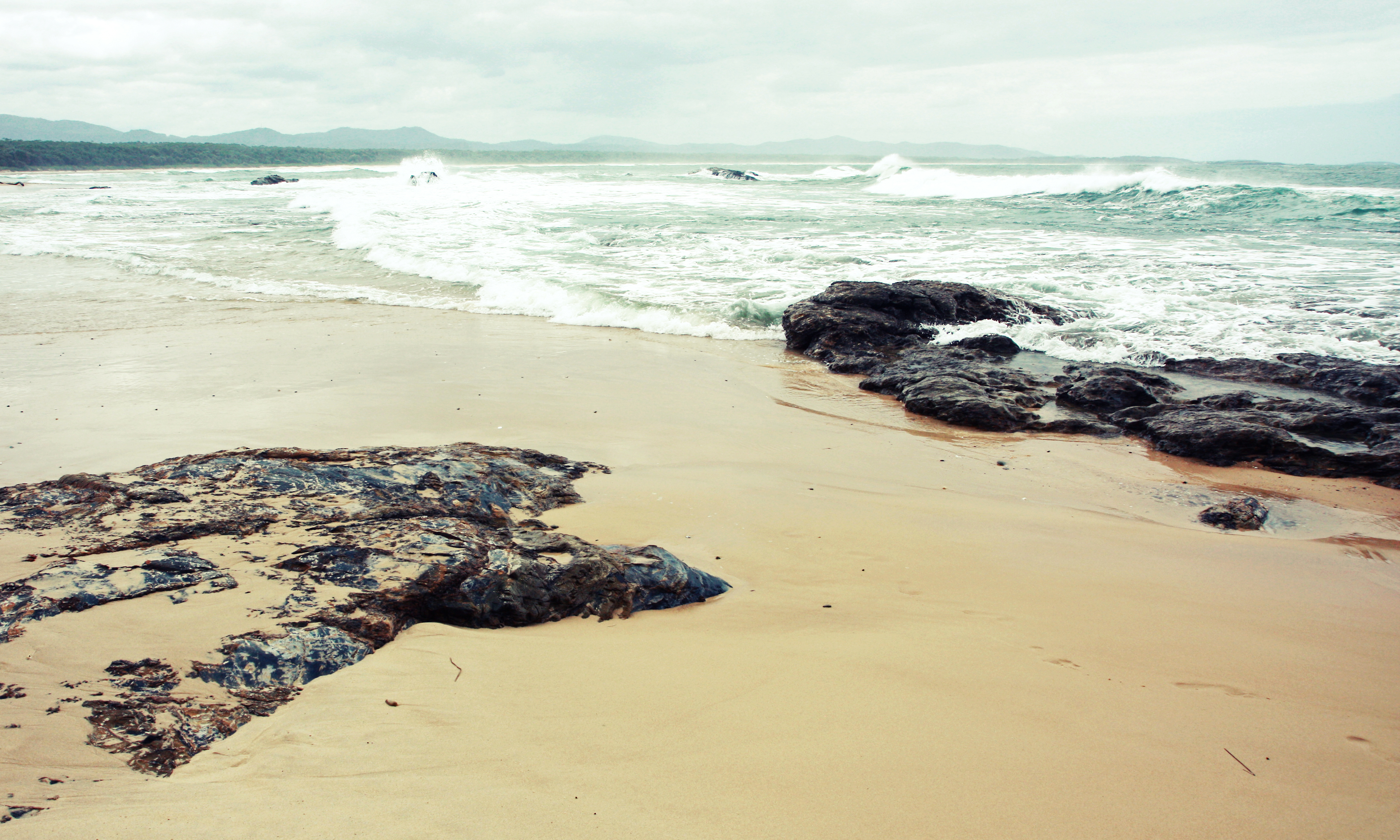
- Bongil Bongil National Park, December 2011

- Location within New South Wales
- Location: New South Wales
- Nearest city: Sawtell
- Coordinates: 30°23′55″S 153°2′5″E
- Area: 42.33 km^{2} (16.34 sq mi)
- Established: 1995
- Governing body: NSW National Parks & Wildlife Service

Bongil Bongil National Park is a national park in New South Wales, Australia, 427 km northeast of Sydney.

Many migratory birds and animals have found refuge in the Bongil Bongil National Park, and the surrounding forests are home to one of the largest koala populations in NSW. About 165 species of birds have been recorded in the park.

== See also ==
- Protected areas of New South Wales
- List of reduplicated Australian place names
