= Kinypanial =

- Town
- Coordinates: 36°21′42″S 143°44′58″E
- Country: Australia
- State: Victoria
- LGA: Shire of Loddon

Government
  - State electorate: Ripon
  - Federal division: Mallee

Population
  - Total: 12 (2021 census)
- Postcode: 3520

Kinypanial is a locality in the Shire of Loddon, Victoria, Australia. At the 2021 census, Kinypanial had a population of 12.
