= County of Lowan =

Lowan Victoria
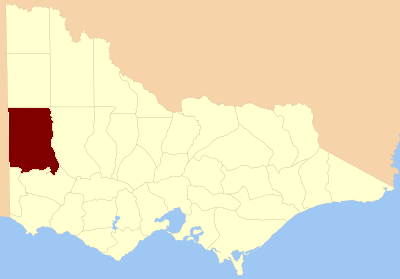
- Location in Victoria
- Established: 24 February 1871
- Area: 12,875 km^{2} (4,971.1 sq mi)
Lands administrative divisions around Lowan:
| Chandos (SA) | Weeah | Karkarooc |
| Buckingham (SA); MacDonnell (SA) | Lowan | Borung |
| Robe (SA) | Dundas; Follett | Dundas |

The County of Lowan is one of the 37 counties of Victoria which are part of the cadastral divisions of Australia, used for land titles. The northern boundary of the county is at 36°S. Larger towns include Dimboola, Edenhope and Kaniva. The county was proclaimed in 1871 together with the other counties of the Wimmera Land District.

== Parishes ==
Parishes within the county:

- Apsley *Arapiles
- Awonga
- Babatchio
- Balrootan
- Bambadin
- Banu Bonyit
- Beewar
- Benayeo
- Berontha
- Bogalara part in the County of Follett
- Boikerbert
- Booroopki
- Bringalbart
- Carchap
- Catiabrim
- Charam
- Connangorach
- Connewirrecoo
- Cooack
- Coynallan
- Curtayne
- Daahl
- Dahwedarre
- Darragan
- Dimboola part in the County of Borung
- Ding-a-ding
- Dinyarrak
- Dollin part in the County of Borung
- Dopewora
- Duchembegarra
- Durndal
- Durong
- Edenhope
- Gerang Gerung
- Goroke
- Gymbowen
- Harrow
- Jallakin
- Jilpanger
- Jungkum
- Kadnook
- Kalingur
- Kaniva
- Karnak
- Kiata
- Kinimakatka
- Konnepra
- Koonik Koonik
- Kout Narin
- Lawloit
- Leeor
- Lillimur
- Lorquon
- Lowan
- Meereek
- Minimay
- Mirampiram
- Mockinya part in the County of Borung
- Moray
- Morea
- Mortat
- Murrandarra
- Murrawong
- Nateyip
- Natimuk
- Neuarpur
- Ni Ni
- Nurcoung
- Nurrabiel
- Peechember
- Pengana
- Perenna
- Pomponderoo
- Propodollah
- Spinifex
- Tallageira
- Tarranginnie
- Telangatuk
- Tooan
- Toolondo
- Toolongrook
- Toonambool
- Tullyvea
- Turandurey
- Tyar
- Warraquil
- Watchegatcheca
- Winiam
- Wombelano
- Woorak
- Woraigworm
- Wytwarrone
- Yallakar
- Yanac-a-yanac
- Yanipy
- Yarrangook
- Yarrock
- Yat Nat
- Yearinga
- Zenobia
