= County of Tanjil =

Coordinates: 37°55′S 146°50′E

Tanjil Victoria
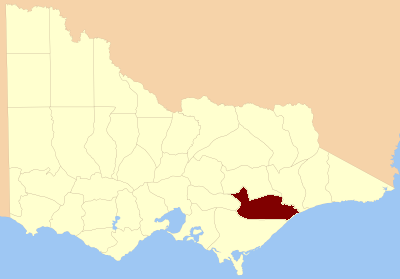
- Location in Victoria
- Established: 24 February 1871
- Area: 7,327 km^{2} (2,829.0 sq mi)
Lands administrative divisions around Tanjil:
| Wonnangatta | Wonnangatta | Dargo |
| Evelyn | Tanjil | Dargo |
| Buln Buln | Buln Buln | Bass Strait |

The County of Tanjil (sometimes spelled Tangil) is one of the 37 counties of Victoria which are part of the cadastral divisions of Australia, used for land titles. It includes the coastal area around the Gippsland Lakes. The Mitchell River is the north-eastern boundary. Before the 1860s, the area was part of the former county of Bruce and part of Haddington.

== Parishes ==
Parishes include:

- Bairnsdale, Victoria
- Baw Baw, Victoria
- Bengworden, Victoria
- Bengworden West, Victoria
- Binnuc, Victoria
- Boola Boola, Victoria
- Boole Poole, Victoria
- Bow-Worrung, Victoria
- Briagolong, Victoria
- Bullung, Victoria
- Bundalaguah, Victoria
- Bundowra, Victoria
- Butgalla, Victoria
- Colquhoun, Victoria
- Coongulla, Victoria
- Coongulmerang, Victoria
- Denison, Victoria
- Gillum, Victoria
- Glenaladale, Victoria
- Glenmaggie, Victoria
- Goon Nure, Victoria
- Koorool, Victoria
- Maffra, Victoria
- Marlooh, Victoria
- Meerlieu, Victoria
- Monomak, Victoria
- Moodarra, Victoria
- Moolpah, Victoria
- Moormurng, Victoria
- Moornapa, Victoria
- Nap-nap-marra, Victoria
- Narrang, Victoria
- Narrobuk, Victoria
- Narrobuk North, Victoria
- Nindoo, Victoria
- Numbruk, Victoria
- Nuntin, Victoria
- Sale, Victoria
- Sargood, Victoria
- Stratford, Victoria
- Tanjil, Victoria
- Tanjil East, Victoria
- Telbit, Victoria
- Tinamba, Victoria
- Toolome, Victoria
- Toombon, Victoria
- Toongabbie North, Victoria
- Toongabbie South, Victoria
- Wa-de-lock, Victoria
- Walhalla, Victoria
- Walhalla East, Victoria
- Winnindoo, Victoria
- Woolenook, Victoria
- Wooundellah, Victoria
- Worrowing, Victoria
- Wrathung, Victoria
- Wrixon, Victoria
- Wurruk Wurruk, Victoria
- Wurutwun, Victoria
- Yangoura, Victoria
- Yeerik, Victoria
- Yeerung, Victoria
