= County of Borung =

Borung
- Cadastral division
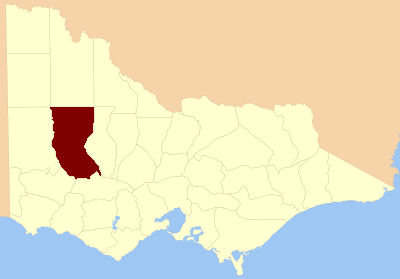
- Location in Victoria
- Country: Australia
- State: Victoria
- Established: 24 February 1871

Area
  - Total: 11,119 km^{2} (4,293 sq mi)
Lands administrative divisions around Borung
Weeah	Karkarooc	Tatchera
Lowan	Borung	Kara Kara
Dundas	Ripon	Ripon

The County of Borung is one of the 37 counties of Victoria which are part of the cadastral divisions of Australia, used for land titles. The northern boundary of the county is at 36°S. At the north its western boundary is 142°E, its eastern boundary is 143°E. Larger urban centres include Dimboola, Warracknabeal, Horsham and Stawell. The county was proclaimed in 1871 together with the other counties of the Wimmera Land District.

== Parishes ==
Parishes within the county:

- Ararat (part in the County of Ripon)
- Areegra
- Ashens
- Bangerang
- Batchica
- Batyik
- Bellaura
- Bellellen
- Beyal
- Boreang East (part in the County of Dundas)
- Boreang West (part in the County of Dundas)
- Boroka
- Bulgana (part in the County of Ripon)
- Bungalally
- Burrong North
- Burrong South
- Burrum Burrum (part in the County of Kara Kara)
- Callawadda (part in the County of Kara Kara)
- Cannum
- Carron
- Concongella
- Concongella South (part in the County of Ripon)
- Corack
- Dimboola (part in the County of Lowan)
- Dollin (part in the County of Lowan)
- Dooen
- Drung Drung
- Dunmunkle
- Dunneworthy (part in the County of Ripon)
- Gampola
- Glenorchy
- Glynwylln (part in the County of Kara Kara)
- Golton Golton
- Hindmarsh
- Horsham
- Illawarra
- Jallukar
- Jeparit
- Joop
- Jung Jung
- Kalkee
- Kalymna (part in the County of Ripon)
- Katyil
- Kellalac
- Kewell East
- Kewell West
- Kirkella
- Knaawing
- Laen
- Lah-arum
- Lallat
- Ledcourt
- Lexington (part in the County of Ripon)
- Longerenong
- Marma
- Mockinya (part in the County of Lowan)
- Mokepilly
- Mount Cole (parts in the County of Kara Kara and County of Ripon)
- Moyston
- Moyston West
- Narraport
- Nullan
- Quantong
- Riachella
- Rich Avon East (part in the County of Kara Kara)
- Rich Avon West
- Rupanyup
- Stawell
- Tarranyurk
- Vectis East
- Wail
- Wallup
- Warmur
- Warracknabeal
- Warrak (part in the County of Kara Kara)
- Warranook
- Warra Warra
- Wartook
- Warung
- Watchem
- Watta Wella
- Werrigar
- Wilkur
- Willam
- Willenabrina
- Wirchilleba (part in the County of Kara Kara)
- Witchipool
- Wonwondah
- Yellangip
