= County of Kara Kara =

Kara Kara Victoria
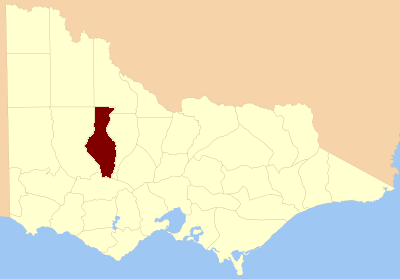
- Location in Victoria
- Established: 24 February 1871
- Area: 5,931 km^{2} (2,290.0 sq mi)
Lands administrative divisions around Kara Kara:
Karkarooc	Tatchera	Tatchera
Borung	Kara Kara	Gladstone
Ripon	Ripon	Gladstone

The County of Kara Kara is one of the 37 counties of Victoria which are part of the cadastral divisions of Australia, used for land titles. The northern boundary of the county is at 36°S. At the north its western boundary is 143°E. Larger towns include St Arnaud and Donald. The County was proclaimed in 1871 together with the other counties of the Wimmera Land District.

== Parishes ==
Parishes within the county:

- Amphitheatre (part in the County of Gladstone)
- Avoca (part in the County of Gladstone)
- Banyena
- Banyenong
- Barkly
- Bolangum
- Bolerch
- Boola Boloke
- Bunguluke
- Burrum Burrum (part in the County of Borung)
- Callawadda (part in the County of Borung)
- Carapooee
- Carapooee West
- Carapugna (part in the County of Tatchera)
- Charlton West
- Coonooer West
- Corack East
- Crowlands (part in the County of Borung)
- Dalyenong
- Darkbonee
- Donald
- Doboobetic
- Eversley
- Glendhu
- Glenlogie (part in the County of Gladstone)
- Glenpatrick
- Glynwylln (part in the County of Borung)
- Gowar (part in the County of Gladstone)
- Gre Gre
- Jeffcott
- Joel Joel (part in the County of Borung)
- Kooreh (part in the County of Gladstone)
- Kooroc (part in the County of Gladstone)
- Landsborough
- Malakoff
- Marnoo
- Moolerr
- Moorl Moorl
- Mount Cole (parts in the County of Borung and County of Ripon)
- Moyreisk
- Navarre
- Redbank
- Rich Avon East (part in the County of Borung)
- St Arnaud
- Swanwater
- Tchirree
- Teddywaddy
- Thalia
- Tottington
- Wallaloo
- Warngar
- Warrak
- Warrenmang
- Winjallok
- Wirchilleba (part in the County of Borung)
- Wooronok
- Wycheproof
- Yehrip
