= County of Grenville, Victoria =

Coordinates: 37°40′S 143°40′E

Grenville Victoria
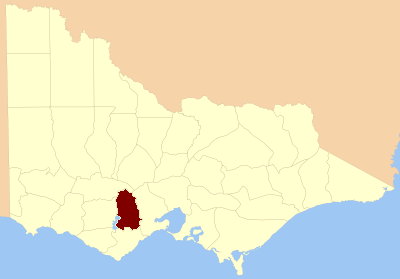
- Location in Victoria
- Established: 10 January 1849
- Area: 3,794 km^{2} (1,464.9 sq mi)
Lands administrative divisions around Grenville:
Ripon	Ripon	Grant
Hampden	Grenville	Grant
Heytesbury	Polwarth	Grant

The County of Grenville is one of the 37 counties of Victoria which are part of the cadastral divisions of Australia, used for land titles. It is located to the north-east of Lake Corangamite and includes Cressy. Ballarat is on its north-eastern edge. The boundary to the east is the Yarrowee River, and to the south part of the Barwon River. Colac is on its southern edge. The county was proclaimed in 1849.

== Parishes ==
Parishes within the county:

- Argyle, Victoria
- Ballaarat, Victoria
- Bungaree, Victoria
- Cardigan, Victoria
- Carngham, Victoria
- Clarkesdale, Victoria
- Commeralghip, Victoria
- Corindhap, Victoria
- Cressy, Victoria
- Cundare, Victoria
- Dereel, Victoria
- Doroq, Victoria
- Dreeite, Victoria
- Enfield, Victoria
- Gellibrand, Victoria
- Haddon, Victoria
- Hesse, Victoria
- Karngun, Victoria
- Kurac-a-ruc, Victoria
- Lawaluk, Victoria
- Lynchfield, Victoria
- Mannibadar, Victoria
- Mindai, Victoria
- Mirnee, Victoria
- Mortchup, Victoria
- Murdeduke, Victoria
- Naringhil North, Victoria
- Naringhil South, Victoria
- Ondit, Victoria
- Poliah North, Victoria
- Poliah South, Victoria
- Poorneet, Victoria
- Scarsdale, Victoria
- Shelford, Victoria
- Shelford West, Victoria
- Smythesdale, Victoria
- Turkeeth, Victoria
- Wallinduc, Victoria
- Warracbarunah, Victoria
- Warrambine, Victoria
- Warrion, Victoria
- Weering, Victoria
- Wilgul North, Victoria
- Wilgul South, Victoria
- Windermere, Victoria
- Wingeel, Victoria
- Wurrook, Victoria
- Yarima, Victoria
- Yarrowee, Victoria
