= Tennyson, Victoria =

Tennyson Victoria
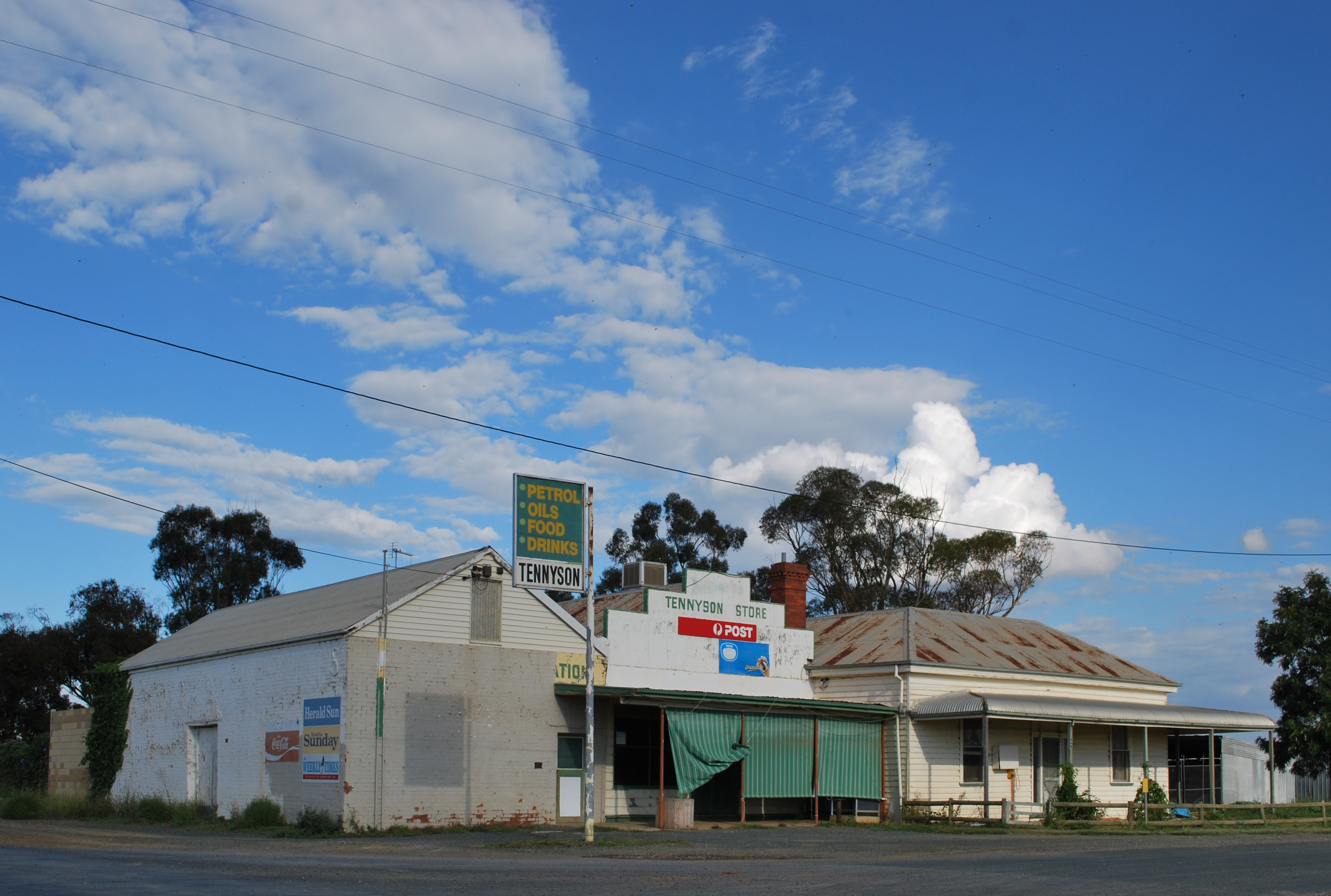
- General store at Tennyson

- Coordinates: 36°18′S 144°26′E
- Population: 48 (2016 census)
- Postcode(s): 3572
- Location: 209 km (130 mi) NW of Melbourne; 58 km (36 mi) N of Bendigo; 43 km (27 mi) SW of Echuca; 31 km (19 mi) W of Rochester; 15 km (9 mi) SW of Lockington
- LGA(s): Shire of Campaspe
- State electorate(s): Murray Plains
- Federal division(s): Nicholls

Tennyson is a locality in north central Victoria, Australia. The locality is in the Shire of Campaspe, 209 kilometres (130 mi) north west of the state capital, Melbourne.

At the 2021 census, Tennyson had a population of 60.

== History ==
Tennyson was settled in the early 1870s and was originally named Pannoomilloo West. In 1875 a school opened called Pannoo Bamawm. In 1909 the Waranga Western Channel was extended, running through Pannoo Bamawm. In 1910 a Hall and Post office opened and the locality's name was changed to Tennyson. In 1954 a school opened in Lockington and the school in Tennyson was closed.
