= County of Wonnangatta =

Coordinates: 37°25′S 146°30′E

Wonnangatta
- Cadastral division
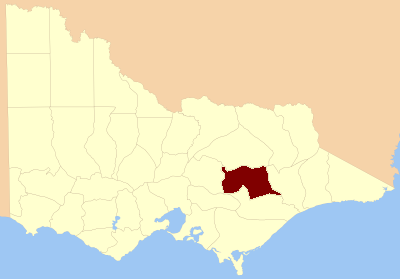
- Location in Victoria
- Country: Australia
- State: Victoria
- Established: 24 February 1871

Area
  - Total: 5,760 km^{2} (2,220 sq mi)
Lands administrative divisions around Wonnangatta
Delatite	Delatite	Bogong
Anglesey	Wonnangatta	Dargo
Evelyn	Tanjil	Tanjil

The County of Wonnangatta is one of the 37 counties of Victoria which are part of the cadastral divisions of Australia, used for land titles. It includes the western parts of the Alpine National Park. The Wonnangatta River is located in the east of the county. Lake Eildon is at the northwestern edge. Mount Buller is on the northern edge.

== Parishes ==
Parishes include:

- Billabong, Victoria
- Bolaira, Victoria
- Boorolite, Victoria
- Buckenderra, Victoria
- Budgee Budgee, Victoria
- Buragwonduc, Victoria
- Changue, Victoria
- Cobbannah, Victoria
- Crookayan, Victoria
- Darlingford, Victoria
- Doledrook, Victoria
- Enoch's Point, Victoria
- Goulburn, Victoria
- Howqua, Victoria
- Howqua West, Victoria
- Jamieson, Victoria
- Kevington, Victoria
- Knockwood, Victoria
- Kybeyan, Victoria
- Lauraville, Victoria
- Licola, Victoria
- Lodge Park, Victoria
- Matlock, Victoria
- Miowera, Victoria
- Moroka, Victoria
- Narbourac, Victoria
- St.Clair, Victoria
- Tamboritha, Victoria
- Taponga, Victoria
- Tarldarn, Victoria
- Torbreck, Victoria
- Warrambat, Victoria
- Wonnangatta, Victoria
- Youarrabuk, Victoria
