= Terrick Terrick =

- Town
- Coordinates: 36°09′03″S 144°13′41″E
- Country: Australia
- State: Victoria
- LGA: Shire of Loddon

Government
  - State electorate: Murray Plains
  - Federal division: Mallee

Population
  - Total: 8 (2021 census)
- Postcode: 3575

Terrick Terrick is a locality in the Shire of Loddon, Victoria, Australia. At the 2021 census, Terrick Terrick had a population of 8.
