= County of Ripon =

Coordinates: 37°30′S 143°00′E

Ripon Victoria
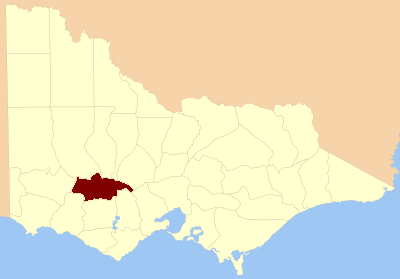
- Location in Victoria
- Established: 10 January 1849
- Area: 4,556 km^{2} (1,759.1 sq mi)
Lands administrative divisions around Ripon:
Borung	Kara Kara	Talbot
Dundas	Ripon	Talbot
Villiers	Hampden	Grenville

The County of Ripon is one of the 37 counties of Victoria which are part of the cadastral divisions of Australia, used for land titles. The county includes the plains of the Western District from Ballarat in the east to the Grampians in the west. Larger towns include Beaufort. The county was proclaimed in 1849.

== Parishes ==
Parishes within the county:

- Ararat (part in the County of Borung)
- Ascot (part in the County of Talbot)
- Baangal
- Ballaarat (parts in the County of Grant, County of Grenville, County of Talbot)
- Ballyrogan
- Beaufort
- Brewster (part in the County of Grenville)
- Buangor
- Bunnugal
- Burrah Burrah
- Burrumbeep
- Burrumbeet
- Caramballuc North
- Carngham (part in the County of Grenville)
- Chepstowe (part in the County of Grenville)
- Colvinsby
- Concongella South (part in the County of Borung)
- Dowling Forest (part in the County of Grenville)
- Dunneworthy (part in the County of Borung)
- Enuc
- Ercildoun (part in the County of Talbot)
- Eurambeen
- Gorrinn
- Helendoite
- Kalymna (part in the County of Borung)
- Kiora
- Lalkaldarno
- Langi-Ghiran
- Langi-kal-kal
- Langi Logan
- Lexington (part in the County of Borung)
- Lillirie (part in the County of Grenville)
- Livingstone
- Mahkwallok
- Mellier
- Merrymbuela (part in the County of Borung)
- Minimera
- Moallaack
- Mount Cole (parts in the County of Borung, County of Kara Kara)
- Nanimia
- Nekeeya
- Parrie Yalloak
- Parupa
- Raglan
- Raglan West
- Shirley
- Streatham
- Tara
- Tatyoon
- Trawalla
- Walla Walla
- Watgania
- Watgania West
- Wickliffe North
- Wickliffe South
- Willaura
- Wongan
- Woodnaggerak
- Yalla-y-poora
- Yangerahwill
