= County of Hampden, Victoria =

Coordinates: 37°59′S 143°00′E

Hampden
- Cadastral division
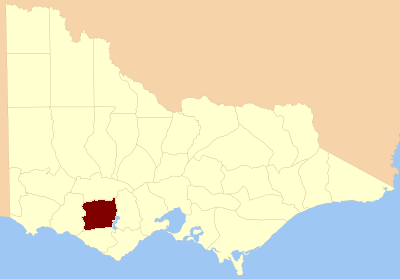
- Location in Victoria
- Country: Australia
- State: Victoria
- Established: 10 January 1849

Area
  - Total: 4,043 km^{2} (1,561 sq mi)
Lands administrative divisions around Hampden
Ripon	Ripon	Grenville
Villiers	Hampden	Grenville
Villiers	Heytesbury	Polwarth

The County of Hampden is one of the 37 counties of Victoria which are part of the cadastral divisions of Australia, used for land titles. The county is in the Western District of Victoria bounded by Lake Corangamite in the east and the Hopkins River in the west. In the north and south the county was bounded approximately by the existing roads, now the Glenelg Highway and the Princes Highway. Larger towns include Terang and Skipton . The county was proclaimed in 1849.

== Parishes ==
Parishes within the county:

- Borriyalloak
- Caramballuc South
- Chatsworth (part in the County of Villiers)
- Cobra Killuc
- Colongulac
- Connewarren
- Corangamite
- Darlington
- Darlington West
- Dunnawalla
- Eilyar
- Ellerslie
- Ettrick
- Framlingham East
- Galla
- Garvoc
- Geelengla
- Glenormiston
- Gnarkeet
- Hexham East
- Jellalabad
- Kariah
- Keilambete
- Kilnoorat
- Kolara
- Koort-koort-nong
- Kornong
- Ligar
- Lismore
- Marida Yallock
- Mortlake
- Nerrin Nerrin
- Panmure
- Pircarra
- Purrumbete North
- Skipton
- Struan
- Taaraak
- Terang
- Terrinallum
- Tooliorook
- Toorak
- Towanway
- Vite Vite
- Wooriwyrite
- Woorndoo
