= County of Dundas, Victoria =

Coordinates: 37°30′S 142°00′E

Dundas
- Cadastral division
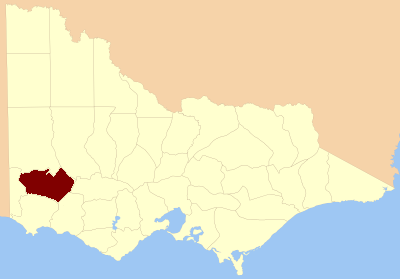
- Location in Victoria
- Country: Australia
- State: Victoria
- Established: 10 January 1849

Area
  - Total: 5,253 km^{2} (2,028 sq mi)
Lands administrative divisions around Dundas
Lowan	Lowan	Borung
Follett	Dundas	Ripon
Follett	Normanby	Villiers

The County of Dundas is one of the 37 counties of Victoria which are part of the cadastral divisions of Australia, used for land titles. The county is in south-western Victoria, bounded primarily by the Glenelg River in the west and north, Grange Burn and the Wannon River in the south, and the eastern edge of the Grampians in the east. The county was proclaimed in 1849.

== Proclamation And Description ==
Dundas was proclaimed on December 29th, 1848 by the Governor of New South Wales, Charles Augustus Fitzroy as one of thirty-one new counties, the majority of which were in territory later ceded by New South Wales to become part of Victoria.

The proclamation defines the county as follows:

County of Dundas, containing about 2000 square miles. Bounded on the west and north by the Glenelg River upwards, from the confluence of the Wannon, to its source tween the ictoria Victoria Range and the Grampians, near Mount William ; on the east by the Grampians to its rocky extremity near Mount Abrupt ; thence to Mount Sturgeon, and by a line crossing the Wannon River, to the north-east corner of the county of Normanby, at the Grange Burn; and on the south by the Grange Burn and the Wannon River, to its confluence with the Glenelg.

The published proclamation contained a misprinted line ("..tween the ictoria...") which was corrected in the 1853 restatement of the county boundaries. No other changes to Dundas were made in the restatement proclamation.

The boundary of the county is defined by the surveying of the lands at the time, meaning in some places the boundary following geological features do not match modern maps. This is most obvious with the definition of the source of the Glenelg River, which turns south west to its source near The Chimney Pots rather than continuing east; Castle Creek instead is the waterway that defines the boundary at the north-eastern corner of the county.

The proclamation was published in the Port Philip Government Gazette on January 10, 1849, which marks the formal establishment date of the county.

== Toponymy ==
Dundas is named after the Dundas Range which runs through the centre of the county. The range was named in honour of Sir David Dundas by Thomas Mitchell in his 1836 expedition.

== Traditional Ownership ==
Traditional ownership of the lands covered by Dundas is held by three groups:

- The Gunditjarma, in the south and west.
- The Eastern Maar, in the south and east.
- The Jarwadjali, in the north.

Exact boundaries between these groups often overlap, as is common through indigenous Australian land regions.

The land was stolen in part by the Henty Brothers whose agricultural squats reached into the southern parts of the area as early as 1835, and then the arrival of numerous squatters in the ten years following the "Australia Felix" expedition of Thomas Mitchell in 1836, the first and most prominent being Charles Wedge. Mitchell's expedition finished with the unexpected discovery of the Henty claims, which were unauthorised by the New South Wales government.

The region covered by the county has a large number of native title claims, particularly around the Grampians region in the east of the county.

== Current Day ==
Hamilton, split with neighbouring county Normanby at the southern border of Dundas, is the largest city in the area with a population of 10,346, with two other towns having populations over a thousand (Coleraine (1,383) and Casterton (1,673, divided between Dundas and neighbouring county Follett).

Dundas is a largely agricultural region, in particular merino sheep farming, and has significant forestry and crop farming.

== Parishes ==
Parishes contained entirely within the county of Dundas

- Balmoral
- Barnoolut
- Beear
- Beerik
- Bepcha
- Bil-Bil-Wyt
- Billiminah
- Bochara
- Brimboal
- Brim Brim
- Brit Brit
- Bruk Bruk
- Bulart
- Bullawin
- Carapook
- Carrak
- Cavendish
- Coleraine
- Dewrang
- Ganoo Ganoo
- Gatum Gatum
- Geerak
- Gringegalgona
- Gritjurk
- Hamilton North
- Hilgray
- Jalur
- Jerrywarook
- Kanawalla
- Karabeal
- Karup Karup
- Kongbool
- Koolomert
- Konong Wootong
- Lambruk
- Larneebunyah
- Mirranatwa
- Mokanger
- Mooralla
- Mooree
- Moorwinstowe
- Mostyn
- Moutajup
- Muntham
- Muryrtym
- Panyyabyr
- Pawbymbyr
- Pendyk Pendyk
- Redruth
- Tarrayoukyan
- Toolang
- Toolka
- Urangara
- Wando
- Wanwandyra
- Warrayure
- Warrock
- Wategat
- Woohlpooer
- Wookurkook
- Wytwalan
- Yarramyljup
- Youpayang

Parishes shared between Normanby and neighbouring counties

=== Boreang East ===
Boreang East is split over Castle Creek (mistaken for the Glenelg River) between Dundas and Borung. The split is a surveying artefact to produce parishes with straight boundaries.

=== Boreang West ===
Boreang East is split over the Glenelg River and Castle Creek (mistaken for the Glenelg River) between Dundas and Borung. The split is a surveying artefact to produce parishes with straight boundaries.

==== Casterton ====
Casterton is split over the Glenelg river between Follett and Dundas. The split exists to facilitate the township of Casterton falling within the same Parish.

==== Wing Wing ====
Wing Wing is split over the Glenelg River between Dundas and Borung. The split is ostensibly a surveying artefact to produce parishes with straight boundaries however an existing road is used for the western boundary somewhat reducing the effectiveness of the attempt.
