= List of places of worship in the City of Greater Bendigo =

This is a list of places of worship in the City of Greater Bendigo, a local government area in the state of Victoria, Australia. The list includes active and former churches and other religious buildings representing a variety of Christian denominations and other faiths.

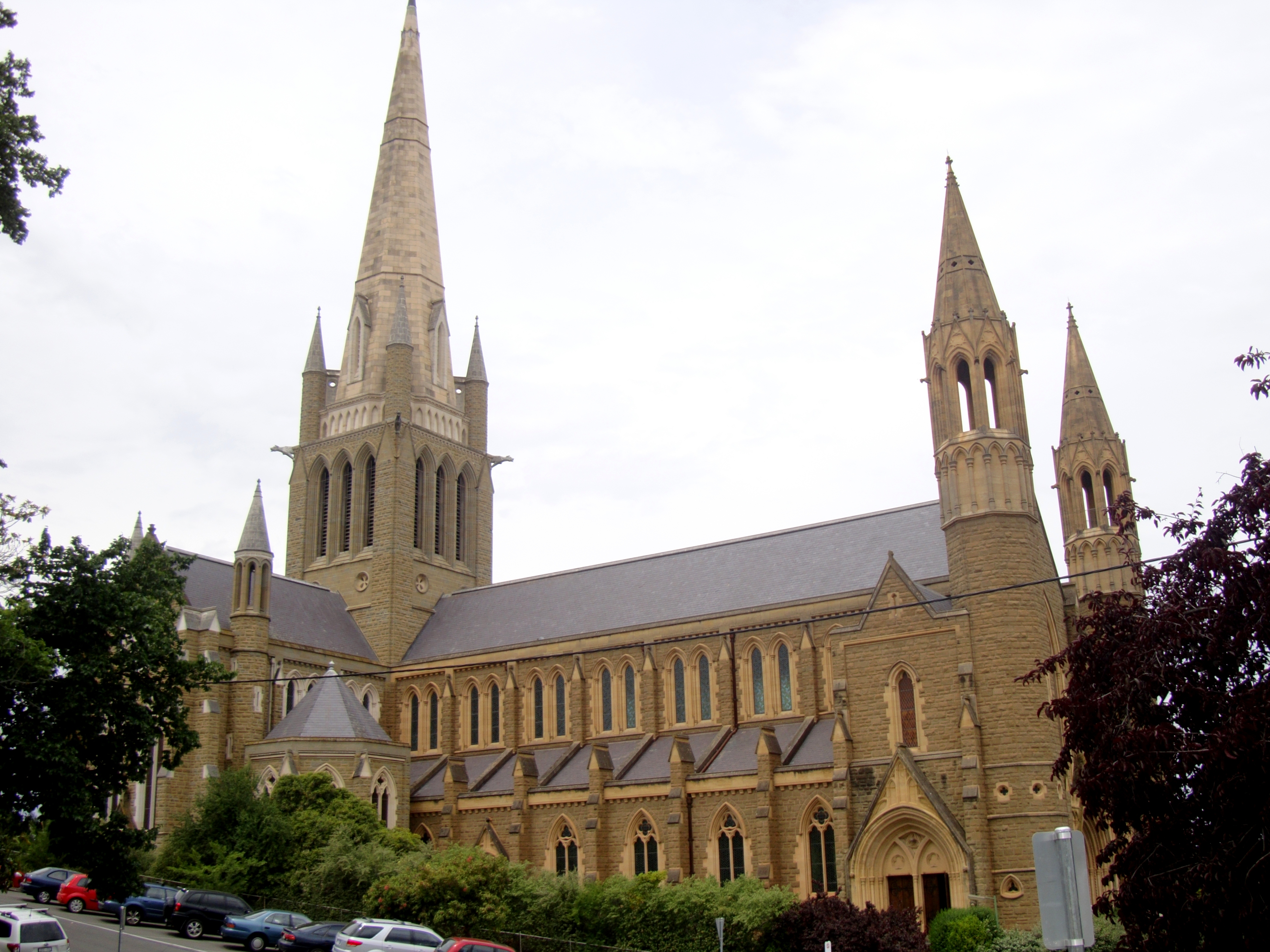
Sacred Heart Cathedral, Bendigo

== Heritage listing status ==
Style	Status
Yes	Listed on the Victorian Heritage Register
–	Not listed

== Current places of worship ==
Current places of worship
Name	Image	Location	Denomination/ Affiliation	Heritage listing	Notes	Refs
Sacred Heart Cathedral		Bendigo; 36.760064°S 144.273957°E	Catholic	Yes		
St Paul's Cathedral, Bendigo		Bendigo; 36.762179°S 144.282787°E	Anglican	Yes		
St James' Catholic Church, Knowsley		Knowsley; 36.827875°S 144.585069°E	Catholic	Yes		
St Joseph's Catholic Church, Axe Creek		Axe Creek; 36.811803°S 144.395457°E	Catholic	Yes		
Lockwood South Uniting Church		Lockwood South; 36.832764°S 144.154624°E	Uniting (formerly Wesleyan Methodist)	Yes		
St Laurence's Catholic Church, Redesdale		Redesdale; 37.019837°S 144.532378°E	Catholic	Yes		
Mia Mia Uniting Church		Mia Mia; 37.005448°S 144.567696°E	Uniting (formerly Presbyterian)	Yes		
St Andrew's Uniting Church, Axedale		Axedale; 36.786808°S 144.500842°E	Uniting (formerly Presbyterian)	Yes		
St Mary's Catholic Church, Axedale		Axedale; 36.786506°S 144.505322°E	Catholic	Yes		
St Clement's Anglican Church, Huntly		Huntly; 36.665121°S 144.332528°E	Anglican	–		
St John's Anglican Church, Heathcote		Heathcote; 36.920417°S 144.706602°E	Anglican	Yes		
Our Lady Help of Christians Catholic Church		Heathcote; 36.918542°S 144.700271°E	Catholic	Yes		
Heathcote Uniting Church		Heathcote; 36.922834°S 144.708973°E	Uniting (formerly Methodist)	–		
Heathcote World Revival Church		Heathcote; 36.926371°S 144.711768°E	Pentecostal	–		
Russian Orthodox Monastery of St Theognios		Heathcote; 36.958225°S 144.693323°E	Russian Orthodox	–		
Coptic Orthodox Monastery of St Anthony		Heathcote; 36.930782°S 144.798594°E	Coptic Orthodox	–		
Epsom Community Church		Epsom; 36.697015°S 144.317255°E	Baptist (formerly Methodist)	–		
St George's Anglican Church, Goornong		Goornong; 36.613695°S 144.510746°E	Anglican	–		
St Paul the Apostle Coptic Orthodox Church (formerly St John's Anglican Church, North Bendigo)		North Bendigo; 36.745440°S 144.281548°E	Coptic Orthodox (formerly Anglican)	–		
Long Gully Uniting Church		Long Gully; 36.745603°S 144.259305°E	Uniting (formerly Methodist)	Yes		
St Matthew's Anglican Church, Long Gully		Long Gully; 36.747118°S 144.257953°E	Anglican	Yes		
St Andrew's Uniting Church, Elmore		Elmore; 36.494003°S 144.611485°E	Uniting (formerly Presbyterian)	–		
St Peter's Anglican Church, Elmore		Elmore; 36.496532°S 144.609121°E	Anglican	–		
Our Lady of the Sacred Heart Catholic Church, Elmore		Elmore; 36.494865°S 144.613888°E	Catholic	–		
St Mary's Anglican Church, Raywood		Raywood; 36.535923°S 144.206133°E	Anglican (formerly Congregational)	Yes		
White Hills Uniting Church		White Hills; 36.729240°S 144.307194°E	Uniting (formerly Wesleyan Methodist)	Yes		
Marong Uniting Church		Marong; 36.734989°S 144.133950°E	Uniting (formerly Presbyterian)	Yes		
St Luke's Anglican Church, White Hills		White Hills; 36.730838°S 144.305866°E	Anglican	Yes		
St Liborius' Catholic Church		Eaglehawk; 36.723566°S 144.256932°E	Catholic	Yes		
St Kilian's Catholic Church		Bendigo; 36.755063°S 144.284138°E	Catholic	Yes		
Kangaroo Flat Uniting Church		Kangaroo Flat; 36.797298°S 144.244991°E	Uniting (formerly Presbyterian)	Yes		
Bendigo Church of Christ		Bendigo; 36.761713°S 144.275565°E	Church of Christ	Yes		
St Augustine's Catholic Church		Myers Flat; 36.707462°S 144.228736°E	Catholic	Yes		
St Monica's Catholic Church		Kangaroo Flat; 36.795107°S 144.244812°E	Catholic	Yes		
St John's Presbyterian Church, Bendigo		Bendigo; 36.758789°S 144.275034°E	Presbyterian	Yes		
St Mark's Anglican Church, Golden Square		Golden Square; 36.772973°S 144.260835°E	Anglican	Yes		
St Stephen's Catholic Church, Raywood		Raywood; 36.536521°S 144.208116°E	Catholic	–		
Holy Rosary Catholic Church, White Hills		White Hills; 36.726312°S 144.310082°E	Catholic	–		
St Peter's Anglican Church, Eaglehawk		Eaglehawk; 36.719577°S 144.255663°E	Anglican	–		
Eaglehawk Uniting Church		Eaglehawk; 36.716786°S 144.247235°E	Uniting (formerly Wesleyan Methodist)	–		
Eaglehawk Presbyterian Church		Eaglehawk; 36.718238°S 144.254539°E	Presbyterian	–		
Bethlehem Lutheran Church		Spring Gully; 36.791873°S 144.284571°E	Lutheran	–		
Neale Street (Kennington) Uniting Church		Kennington; 36.767740°S 144.294115°E	Uniting (formerly Methodist)	–		
St Therese's Catholic Church		Kennington; 36.766745°S 144.298504°E	Catholic	–		
Golden City Baptist Church		Golden Square; 36.764689°S 144.259716°E	Baptist	–		
Bendigo Seventh-day Adventist Church		Golden Square; 36.775663°S 144.252929°E	Seventh-day Adventist	–		
Kangaroo Flat Baptist Church		Kangaroo Flat; 36.798444°S 144.244634°E	Baptist	–		
St Mary's Anglican Church, Kangaroo Flat		Kangaroo Flat; 36.800470°S 144.243815°E	Anglican	–		
Greek Orthodox Church of the Dormition of our Lady		Ironbark; 36.755975°S 144.263727°E	Greek Orthodox	–		
Connect Church		East Bendigo; 36.751908°S 144.303203°E	Pentecostal	–		
Christ Church, East Bendigo (Christ's True Light Anglican Church)		East Bendigo; 36.750877°S 144.297568°E	Anglican	–		
Reforming Church		East Bendigo; 36.742595°S 144.318316°E	Presbyterian	–		
Creek Street Church		Bendigo; 36.765192°S 144.271455°E	Non-denominational	–		
Guan Yin Temple		Bendigo; 36.754875°S 144.282966°E	Taoism	–		
Bendigo Joss House		North Bendigo; 36.739311°S 144.291250°E	Multi-faith (Chinese)	Yes		
Great Stupa of Universal Compassion		Myers Flat; 36.720158°S 144.186986°E	Buddhism	–		
Bendigo Islamic Community Centre		East Bendigo; 36.741516°S 144.315999°E	Islam	–		
Strathfieldsaye Community Church		Strathfieldsaye; 36.806688°S 144.355068°E	Baptist (formerly Methodist)	Yes		

== Former places of worship ==
Former places of worship
Name	Image	Location	Denomination/ Affiliation	Heritage listing	Notes	Refs
St Andrew's Anglican Church, Fosterville		Fosterville; 36.688835°S 144.436472°E	Anglican	Non-existent		
St Stephen's Anglican Church, Emu Creek		Emu Creek; 36.831859°S 144.354846°E	Anglican	Yes		
Mandurang Uniting Church		Mandurang; 36.823242°S 144.294153°E	Uniting (formerly Bible Christian (Methodist))	Yes		
Redesdale Bible Christian Church		Redesdale; 36.987344°S 144.504382°E	Bible Christian (Methodist)	Yes		
Argyle Wesleyan Methodist Church		Argyle; 36.948404°S 144.724847°E	Wesleyan Methodist	Yes		
St Paul's Anglican Church, Axedale		Axedale; 36.789651°S 144.502028°E	Anglican	Yes		
St Andrew's Presbyterian Church, Heathcote		Heathcote; 36.921130°S 144.708840°E	Presbyterian	–		
Costerfield Uniting Church		Costerfield; 36.872571°S 144.790586°E	Uniting (formerly Wesleyan Methodist)	–		
Costerfield Catholic Church		Costerfield; 36.873585°S 144.790169°E	Catholic	–		
Derrinal Wesleyan Methodist Church		Derrinal; 36.875365°S 144.632239°E	Wesleyan Methodist	Non-existent		
California Gully Uniting Church		California Gully; 36.732446°S 144.255848°E	Uniting (formerly Methodist)	Yes		
St Jude's Anglican Church, California Gully		California Gully; 36.736247°S 144.253817°E	Anglican	–		
Union Street Bible Christian Mission		West Bendigo; 36.756904°S 144.253987°E	Bible Christian (Methodist)	–		
Catholic Church of St Pius X		Long Gully; 36.748777°S 144.263668°E	Catholic	–		
Elmore Methodist Church		Elmore; 36.494499°S 144.610507°E	Methodist	–		
Drummartin Uniting Church		Drummartin; 36.443745°S 144.430004°E	Uniting (formerly Methodist)	–		
Golden Square Uniting Church		Golden Square; 36.772162°S 144.261910°E	Uniting (formerly Methodist)	Yes		
Eaglehawk East Uniting Church		Eaglehawk; 36.720074°S 144.255324°E	Uniting (formerly Primitive Methodist)	Yes		
Raywood Uniting Church		Raywood; 36.537330°S 144.206558°E	Uniting (formerly Methodist)	Yes		
St Andrew's Uniting Church, Bendigo		Bendigo; 36.760844°S 144.284722°E	Uniting (formerly Presbyterian)	Yes		
St Stephen's Anglican Church		Lockwood; 36.802332°S 144.161124°E	Anglican	Yes		
Holy Trinity Anglican Church, Marong		Marong; 36.734418°S 144.132923°E	Anglican	Yes		
St Francis Xavier Catholic Church, Woodvale		Woodvale; 36.626813°S 144.155243°E	Catholic	Yes		
Bendigo Bible Christian Church		Bendigo; 36.764024°S 144.266072°E	Bible Christian (Methodist)	Yes		
St Patrick's Catholic Church, Marong		Marong; 36.732496°S 144.133190°E	Catholic	Yes		
Christ Church, Sebastian		Sebastian; 36.603376°S 144.187197°E	Anglican	Non-existent		
Langley Hall Chapel		White Hills; 36.731143°S 144.306309°E	Anglican	–		
Bendigo (Bridge Street) Methodist Church		Bendigo; 36.747662°S 144.288588°E	Methodist	–		
Bendigo (Forest Street) Methodist Church		Bendigo; 36.759423°S 144.275650°E	Wesleyan Methodist	–		
Arnold Street Uniting Church		North Bendigo; 36.746314°S 144.277113°E	Uniting (formerly Wesleyan Methodist)	–		
North Bendigo Catholic Church		North Bendigo; 36.742355°S 144.280247°E	Catholic	–		
St Mary's Catholic Church, Golden Square		Golden Square; 36.774014°S 144.256069°E	Catholic	–		
Bethlehem Lutheran Church (old) (East Sandhurst Congregational Church)		Bendigo; 36.764509°S 144.285623°E	Lutheran (formerly Congregational)	–		
All Saints' Anglican Pro-Cathedral, Bendigo		Bendigo; 36.758385°S 144.275421°E	Anglican	–		

== See also ==
- List of places of worship in the City of Ballarat
- List of places of worship in the City of Greater Geelong
