= Shire of Strathfieldsaye =

Coordinates: 36°47′S 144°18′E

- Local government area
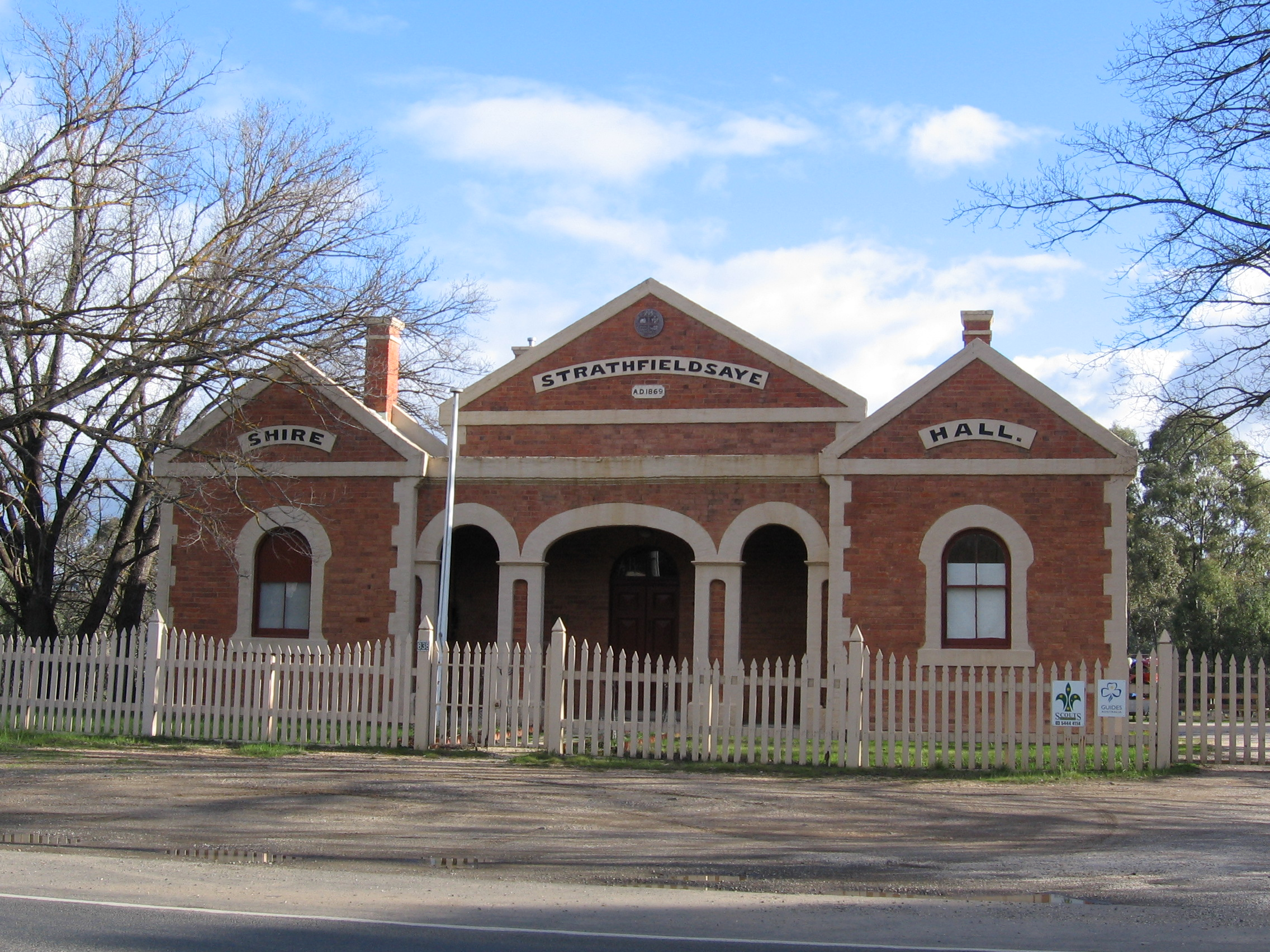
- Former Shire of Strathfieldsaye Shire Hall

- The Shire of Strathfieldsaye as at its dissolution in 1994
- Country: Australia
- State: Victoria
- Region: North Central Victoria
- Established: 1861
- Council seat: Kennington

Area
  - Total: 601.34 km^{2} (232.18 sq mi)

Population
  - Total: 19,760 (1992)
  - Density: 32.860/km^{2} (85.107/sq mi)
- County: Bendigo
LGAs around Shire of Strathfieldsaye
Bendigo (C)	Huntly	Waranga
Marong	Shire of Strathfieldsaye	McIvor
Maldon	Metcalfe	McIvor

The Shire of Strathfieldsaye was a local government area immediately to the east and southeast of the regional city of Bendigo, Victoria, Australia, and included the eastern suburbs of Bendigo's metropolitan area. The shire covered an area of 601.34 square kilometres (232.2 sq mi), and existed from 1861 until 1994.

== History ==
Strathfieldsaye was first incorporated as a road district on 20 August 1861, and became a shire on 17 September 1866.

On 20 July 1993, Strathfieldsaye Council was suspended, and a commissioner appointed, after allegations of the council being divided and unworkable.

On 7 April 1994, the Shire of Strathfieldsaye was abolished, and along with the City of Bendigo, the Borough of Eaglehawk, the Rural City of Marong and the Shire of Huntly, was merged into the newly created City of Greater Bendigo.

== Wards ==
The Shire of Strathfieldsaye was divided into three wards, each of which elected three councillors:

- Axedale Ward
- Mandurang Ward
- Strathfieldsaye Ward

== Towns and localities ==
- Axedale
- Bendigo East
- Diamond Hill
- Emu Creek
- Lake Eppalock
- Junortoun
- Kangaroo Flat
- Kennington*
- Longlea
- Mandurang
- Mandurang South
- Mosquito Creek
- Myrtle Creek
- Sedgwick
- Spring Gully
- Strathdale
- Strathfieldsaye

* Council seat.

== Population ==
Year	Population
1954	4,213
1958	4,870*
1961	6,031
1966	6,704
1971	7,711
1976	10,256
1981	12,609
1986	15,011
1991	18,456

* Estimate in the 1958 Victorian Year Book.
