= County of Bendigo =

Coordinates: 36°50′S 144°10′E

Bendigo
- Cadastral division
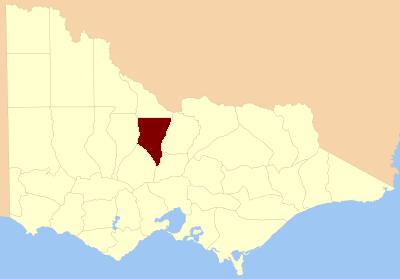
- Location in Victoria
- Country: Australia
- State: Victoria
- Established: 9 July 1869

Area
  - Total: 5,048 km^{2} (1,949 sq mi)
Lands administrative divisions around Bendigo
| Tatchera | Gunbower | Rodney |
| Gladstone | Bendigo | Rodney |
| Gladstone | Talbot | Dalhousie |

The County of Bendigo is one of the 37 counties of Victoria which are part of the cadastral divisions of Australia, used for land titles. It includes the city of Bendigo. It is bounded by the Campaspe River in the east, and the Loddon River in the west. The county was proclaimed in 1869.

== Parishes ==
Parishes within the county:

- Axedale, Victoria (also in Rodney)
- Bagshot, Victoria
- Ballendella, Victoria
- Bamawm, Victoria
- Bridgewater, Victoria
- Calivil, Victoria
- Derby, Victoria
- Diggorra, Victoria
- Dingee, Victoria
- Egerton, Victoria
- Ellesmere, Victoria
- Elmore, Victoria
- Eppalock, Victoria
- Goornong, Victoria
- Hayanmi, Victoria
- Huntly, Victoria
- Janiember East, Victoria
- Janiember West, Victoria
- Jarklan, Victoria
- Kamarooka, Victoria
- Kimbolton, Victoria
- Knowsley, Victoria
- Knowsley East, Victoria
- Laanecoorie, Victoria
- Leichardt, Victoria
- Lockwood, Victoria
- Lyell, Victoria
- Mandurang, Victoria
- Marong, Victoria
- Milloo, Victoria
- Minto, Victoria
- Mitiamo, Victoria
- Neilborough, Victoria
- Nerring, Victoria
- Nolan, Victoria
- Pannoobamawm, Victoria
- Pannoomilloo, Victoria
- Pompapeil, Victoria
- Ravenswood, Victoria (also in Talbot)
- Rochester West, Victoria
- Salisbury, Victoria
- Sandhurst
- Sedgwick, Victoria
- Shelbourne, Victoria
- Strathfieldsaye, Victoria
- Talambe, Victoria
- Tandarra, Victoria
- Wanurp, Victoria
- Warragamba, Victoria
- Wellsford, Victoria
- Whirrakee, Victoria
- Woodstock, Victoria
- Yallook, Victoria
- Yarraberb, Victoria
- Yarryne, Victoria
