= Shire of Huntly =

Coordinates: 36°40′S 144°20′E

- Local government area
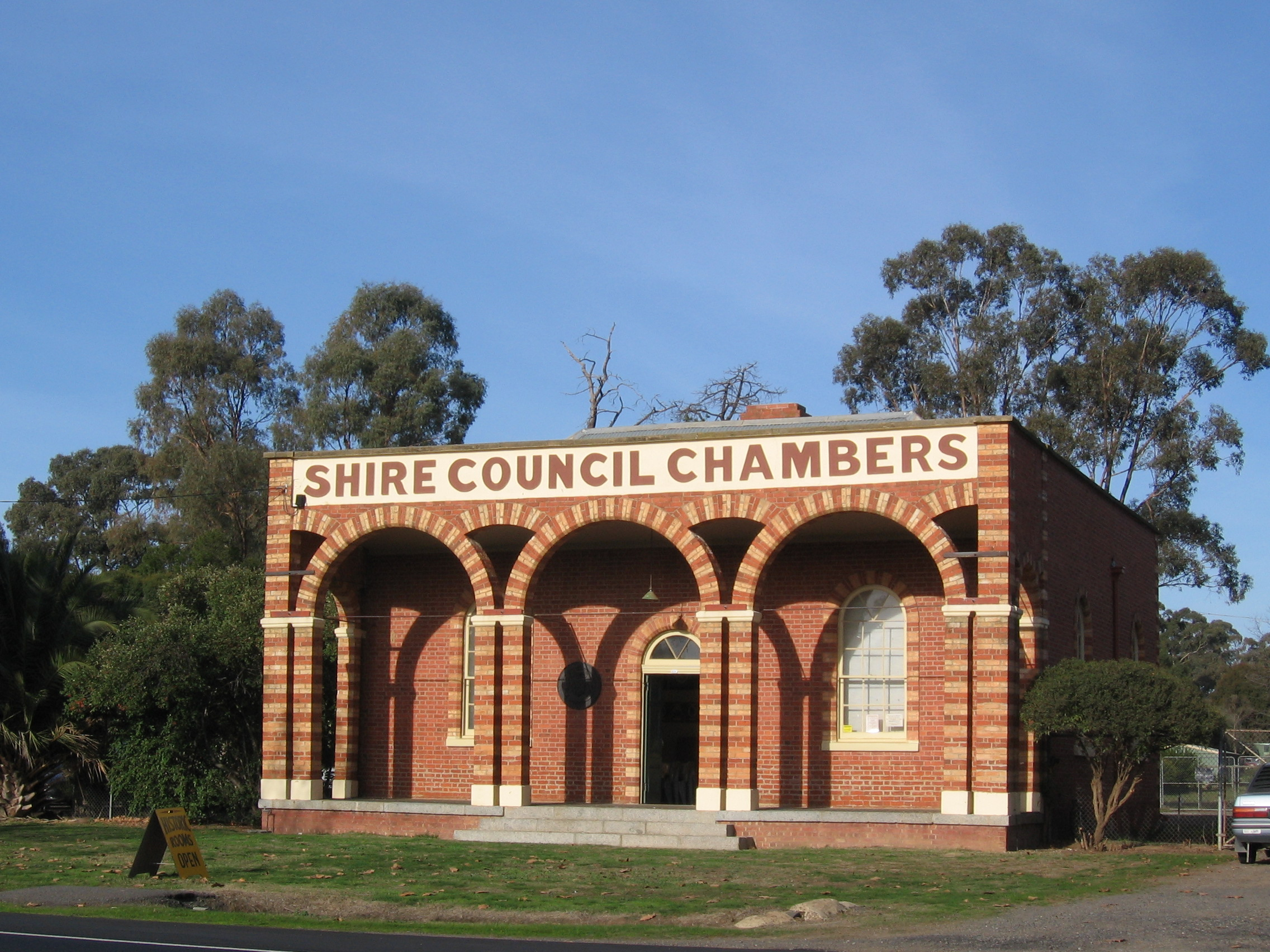
- Former Shire of Huntly Council Chambers

- The Shire of Huntly as at its dissolution in 1994
- Country: Australia
- State: Victoria
- Region: North Central Victoria
- Established: 1861
- Council seat: Huntly

Area
  - Total: 878 km^{2} (339 sq mi)

Population
  - Total(s): 4,800 (1992)
  - Density: 5.47/km^{2} (14.16/sq mi)
- County: Bendigo
LGAs around Shire of Huntly
East Loddon	Rochester	Rochester
Marong	Shire of Huntly	Waranga
Bendigo (C)	Strathfieldsaye	McIvor

The Shire of Huntly was a local government area immediately to the northeast of the regional city of Bendigo, Victoria, Australia. The shire covered an area of 878 square kilometres (339.0 sq mi), and existed from 1866 until 1994.

The town of Huntly is around ten kilometres north of the centre of Bendigo.

== History ==
The need for a council at Huntly arose from gold and quartz mining in the area, including alluvial deposits and some deep leads. Huntly was first incorporated as the Road District of Campaspe on 10 March 1861, and became a shire on 13 July 1866. From 1867 until 1977, councillors met at the Council Chambers at 620-634 Midland Highway, Huntly, but subsequently they moved into a new location.

On 7 April 1994, the Shire of Huntly was abolished and, along with the City of Bendigo, the Borough of Eaglehawk, the Rural City of Marong and the Shire of Strathfieldsaye, was merged into the newly created City of Greater Bendigo.

== Wards ==
The Shire of Huntly was divided into three wards, each of which elected three councillors:

- North Ward
- South Ward
- West Ward

== Towns and localities ==
- Ascot
- Avonmore
- Bagshot
- Bagshot North
- Barnadown
- Diggora West
- Drummartin
- Elmore
- Epsom
- Fosterville
- Goornong
- Hunter
- Huntly*
- Kamarooka
- Kamarooka State Park
- May Reef
- Minto
- Warragamba

* Council seat.

== Population ==
Year	Population
1954	2,247
1958	2,330*
1961	2,295
1966	2,333
1971	2,242
1976	2,400
1981	3,043
1986	3,896
1991	4,542

* Estimate in the 1958 Victorian Year Book.
