= Rural City of Marong =

- Local government area
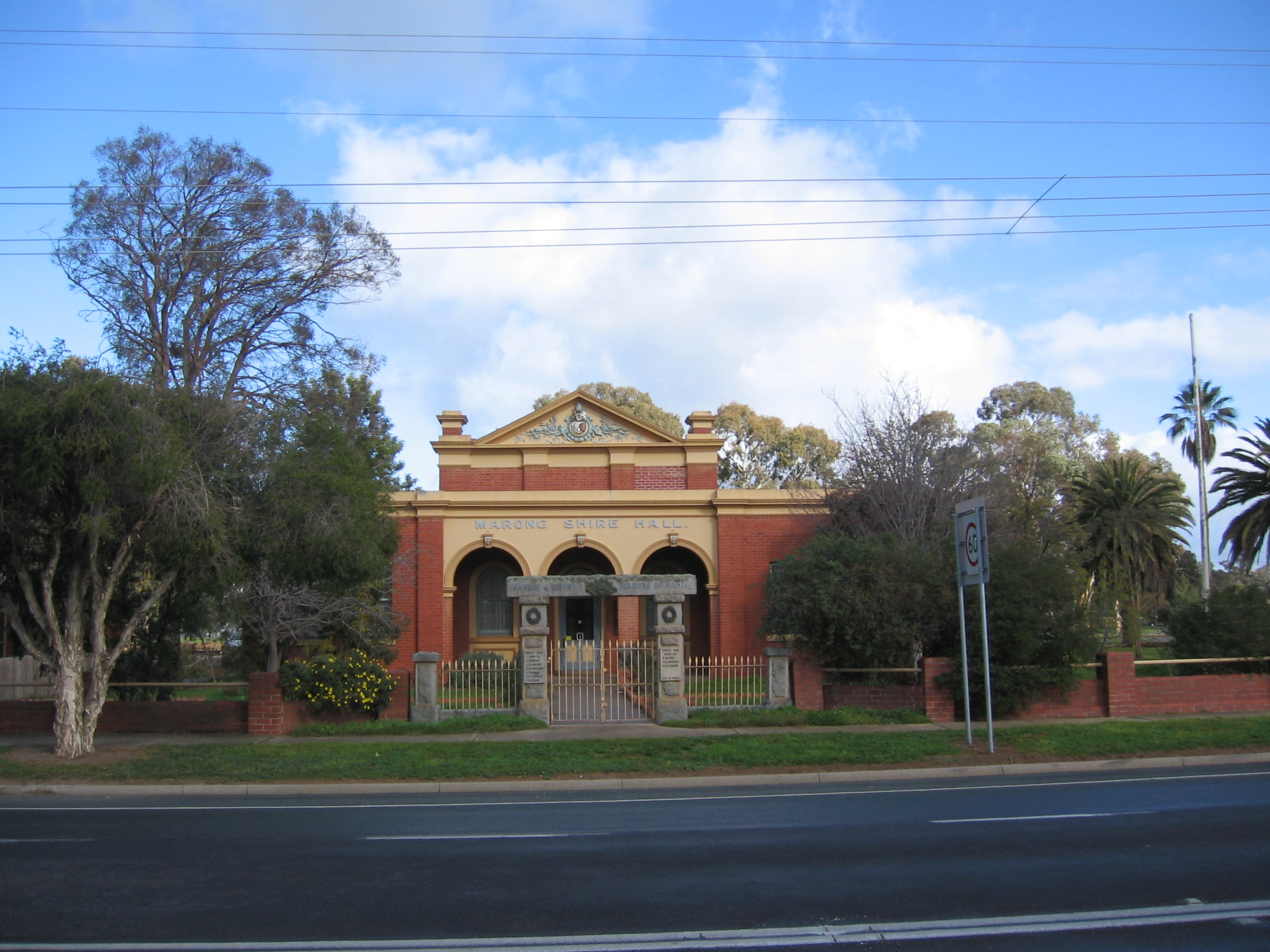
- Former Shire Hall at Marong

- The Rural City of Marong as at its dissolution in 1994
- Country: Australia
- State: Victoria
- Region: North Central Victoria
- Established: 1861
- Council seat: Marong

Area
  - Total: 1,488.93 km^{2} (574.88 sq mi)

Population
  - Total: 15,880 (1992)
  - Density: 10.665/km^{2} (27.623/sq mi)
- County: Bendigo
LGAs around Rural City of Marong
| Korong | East Loddon | Huntly |
| Bet Bet | Rural City of Marong | Eaglehawk; Bendigo (C) |
| Tullaroop | Maldon | Strathfieldsaye |

The Rural City of Marong was a local government area about 150 kilometres (93 mi) north-northwest of Melbourne, the state capital of Victoria, Australia. The rural city covered an area of 1,488.93 square kilometres (574.9 sq mi), and existed from 1861 until 1994.

== History ==
Marong was first incorporated as a road district on 27 August 1861, and became a shire on 23 December 1864. On 1 October 1915, the Borough of Raywood, which was gazetted on 17 January 1865 on 23.31 square kilometres (9.00 sq mi) of land 28 kilometres (17 mi) north of Bendigo, was united with Marong. On 1 October 1990, the Shire of Marong became a rural city, under the Local Government Act 1989.

=== Amalgamation ===
The council briefly made State headlines in the circumstances surrounding its amalgamation. The Kennett Liberal government, elected in 1992, had embarked on an ambitious program of local government reform and restructuring across Victoria. Under the Local Government (General Amendment) Act 1993, a Local Government Board, chaired by Leonie Burke, was established to advise the State Government on municipal matters. In a report on 17 February 1994, the Local Government Board recommended that the five councils in the Bendigo region merge to form a "super city", with a population of about 81,000, much as Geelong had done the previous year. Marong, Eaglehawk and Huntly had earlier objected to the proposal, and the Board noted a weak no vote against the merger proposal in a referendum in the region; about 70% had voted against, but with a turnout of between 30% and 40% of eligible voters.

The three councils filed a writ in the Supreme Court, alleging failure to follow process by the Minister for Local Government, Roger Hallam, but by the time the new "super city" was announced, the writ had not yet been heard, and on 24 March 1994, the Rural City of Marong successfully applied for an injunction blocking the publication of the gazette the following day abolishing the five councils and appointing three commissioners, led by Peter Ross-Edwards, the former leader of the Victorian National Party. The government responded by introducing legislation, the City of Greater Bendigo Bill 1994, to Parliament, to effectively override the Supreme Court action, with Hallam saying "the bill would make clear that the Government is determined to achieve its objective for a more efficient municipal structure for the Bendigo region." Marong mayor Robert Hynes described the action as "terribly disappointing", adding, "One way or another, I believe it does mean an end to our fight... it seems the Government are above the law to me." On 6 April 1994, Marong voted to drop the Supreme Court action, effectively in doing so voting itself out of existence, and on 7 April 1994, the Rural City of Marong was abolished, and along with the City of Bendigo, the Borough of Eaglehawk and the Shires of Huntly and Strathfieldsaye, was merged into the newly created City of Greater Bendigo. On 29 April 1994, the Minister confirmed the Bill was not being proceeded with.

On 19 January 1995, the rural western half of Marong's former territory, including the town of Bridgewater On Loddon, was detached from Greater Bendigo and added to the newly formed the Shire of Loddon.

== Wards ==
The Rural City of Marong was divided into three wards on 30 May 1988, each of which elected three councillors:

- Central Ward
- North Ward
- South Ward

== Towns and localities ==
- Big Hill
- Bridgewater on Loddon
- Campbells Forest
- Crusoe Gully
- Derby
- Eastville
- Kangaroo Flat
- Laanecoorie
- Leichardt
- Lockwood
- Lockwood South
- Maiden Gully
- Marong*
- Myers Flat
- Newbridge
- Ravenswood
- Raywood
- Sebastian
- Shelbourne

* Council seat.

== Population ==
| Year | Population |
|---|---|
| 1954 | 5,421 |
| 1958 | 5,960* |
| 1961 | 6,100 |
| 1966 | 6,483 |
| 1971 | 6,905 |
| 1976 | 8,168 |
| 1981 | 9,869 |
| 1986 | 11,744 |
| 1991 | 14,723 |

* Estimate in the 1958 Victorian Year Book.
