= Bagshot (disambiguation) =

Bagshot is a village in the Surrey Heath borough of Surrey, England.

Bagshot may also refer to:

== Places in England ==
- Bagshot, Wiltshire
- Bagshot Heath
- Bagshot Park, home of the Duke and Duchess of Edinburgh
- Bagshot Rural District, now Surrey Heath, a local government district in Surrey

== Other uses ==
- Bagshot F.C., Surrey, England
- Bagshot Formation, an Eocene sedimentary rock formation
- Bagshot Row, the residence of Bilbo Baggins and Frodo Baggins in The Lord of the Rings
- Bathilda Bagshot, a fictional character in the Harry Potter books
- Walter Bagehot (1826–1877), English journalist and writer
- Bristol Bagshot, a British biplane fighter design
- HMS Bagshot, a British Royal Navy minesweeper
- Bagshot, Victoria, Australia
- Bagshot North, Victoria, Australia
