= Eaglehawk (disambiguation) =

Eaglehawk is another name for the wedge-tailed eagle.

Eaglehawk may also refer to:

- Eaglehawk, Victoria is a suburb of Bendigo, itself a part of the City of Greater Bendigo in Victoria, Australia
  - Eaglehawk Football Club
  - Eaglehawk North
  - Eaglehawk railway station
- Eaglehawk Neck, an isthmus connecting the Tasman Peninsula to the Forestier Peninsula in Tasmania, Australia
- Biraban, also known as Eagle Hawk
