= City of Bendigo =

Coordinates: 36°45′S 144°16′E

- Local government area
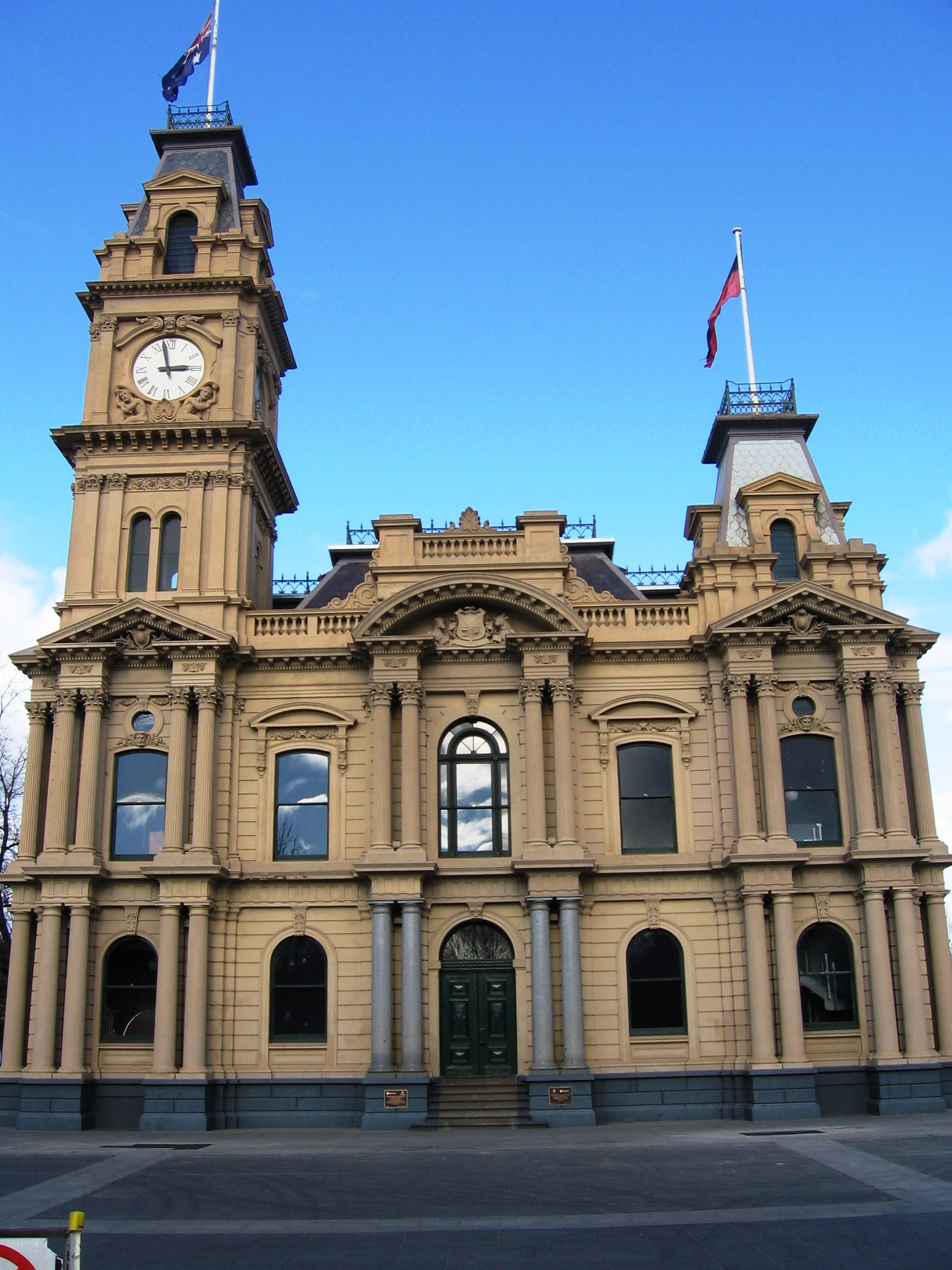
- Bendigo Town Hall

- The City of Bendigo as at its dissolution in 1994
- Country: Australia
- State: Victoria
- Region: North Central Victoria
- Established: 1855
- Council seat: Bendigo

Area
  - Total: 32.53 km^{2} (12.56 sq mi)

Population
  - Total(s): 30,890 (1992)
  - Density: 949.58/km^{2} (2,459.4/sq mi)
LGAs around City of Bendigo
Eaglehawk	Marong	Huntly
Marong	City of Bendigo	Strathfieldsaye
Marong	Strathfieldsaye	Strathfieldsaye

The City of Bendigo was a local government area covering the central area and inner western suburbs of the regional city of Bendigo, Victoria, Australia. The city covered an area of 32.53 square kilometres (12.6 sq mi), and existed from 1855 to 1994.

== History ==
The City of Bendigo was first incorporated as the Sandhurst Municipality on 24 April 1855. It became a borough on 11 September 1863, and a city on 21 July 1871. It was renamed as the City of Bendigo on 8 May 1891.

On 7 April 1994, the City of Bendigo was abolished, and along with the Borough of Eaglehawk, the Rural City of Marong and the Shires of Huntly and Strathfieldsaye, was merged into the newly created City of Greater Bendigo.

== Wards ==
The City of Bendigo was divided into three wards, each of which elected three councillors:

- Barkly Ward
- Darling Ward
- Sutton Ward

== Town Clerks ==
In February 1983, the position of Town Clerk was officially renamed Chief Executive Officer.

#	Name	Term
1	William Hopkins	1856 (Note: Held office for four months only.)
2	George Avery Fletcher	1856–1875
3	Dugald Macdougall	1875–1879 (Note: Held office for three years until his death from heart disease. Thomas William McCulloch served as acting town clerk until Denovan's appointment the same year.)
4	William Dixon Campbell Denovan	1879–1892
5	William Honeybone	1892–1923
6	Henry Chapman Ingleton	1924–1933
7	Frederick Thomas Amer	1933–1957
8	A. J. "Jack" Watts	1957–1977
9	C. Keith Beamish	1977–1984
10	Ray J. Burton	1984–1994

Claude

== Suburbs ==
- Bendigo*
- Golden Square
- Ironbark
- Long Gully
- North Bendigo
- Quarry Hill
- West Bendigo
- White Hills

* Council seat.

== Population ==
Year	Population
1954	28,726
1958	30,700*
1961	30,195
1966	30,792
1971	32,007
1976	32,573
1981	31,841
1986	30,704
1991	30,134

* Estimate in the 1958 Victorian Year Book.
