= City of Greater Bendigo =

Coordinates: 36°45′S 144°17′E

- Local government area
- Location in Victoria

- Interactive map of City of Greater Bendigo
- Country: Australia
- State: Victoria
- Region: Loddon Mallee
- Established: 1994
- Council seat: Bendigo

Government
  - Mayor: Thomas Prince
  - State electorates: Bendigo East; Bendigo West; Euroa
  - Federal division: Bendigo

Area
  - Total: 3,000 km^{2} (1,200 sq mi)

Population
  - Total: 121,470 (2021)
  - Density: 40/km^{2} (105/sq mi)
- Gazetted: 7 April 1994
- Website: City of Greater Bendigo
LGAs around City of Greater Bendigo
Loddon	Campaspe	Campaspe
Loddon	City of Greater Bendigo	Strathbogie
Mount Alexander	Mount Alexander	Mitchell

The City of Greater Bendigo is a local government area in Victoria, Australia, located in the central part of the state. It covers an area of 3,000 square kilometres (1,200 mi^{2}) and, in August 2021, had a population of 121,470. It includes the city of Bendigo and the towns of Axedale, Elmore, Heathcote, Marong, Raywood and Strathfieldsaye. It is the state's third largest economy base and is considered a service and infrastructure centre for north central Victoria. The city is surrounded by 40,000 hectares of regional, state and national parkland.

The city is governed and administered by the Greater Bendigo City Council; its seat of local government and administrative centre is located at the council headquarters in Bendigo, it also has service centres located in Heathcote, Huntly, Marong and a couple of other locations within Bendigo. The city is named after the main urban settlement lying in the centre-west of the LGA, that is Bendigo, which is also the LGA's most populous urban area with a population of 99,122.

== History ==
The City of Greater Bendigo was formed on 7 April 1994, initially from the amalgamation of the former City of Bendigo with the Borough of Eaglehawk, the Shire of Strathfieldsaye, the Shire of Huntly and the Rural City of Marong.

In November 1994, the city gained the Heathcote district and the Lake Eppalock hinterland from the Shire of McIvor. In January 1995, the rural western flank of the city (part of the former Rural City of Marong) was moved into the new Shire of Loddon, while the city gained the Redesdale district from the Shire of Metcalfe.

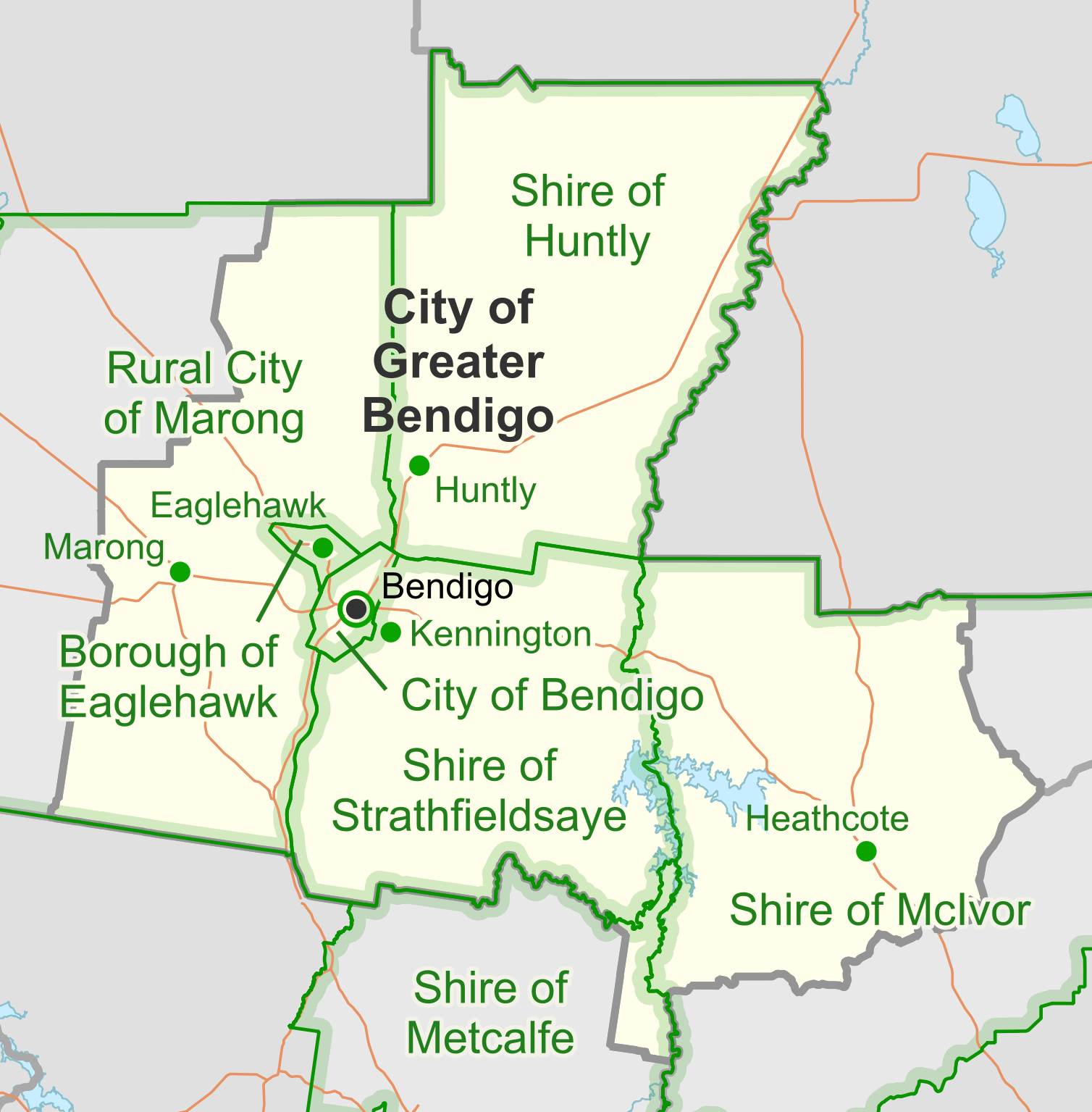
The city's predecessor LGAs (green) as they were in 1994. The administrative centres of the former LGAs are marked by green dots.

== Council ==
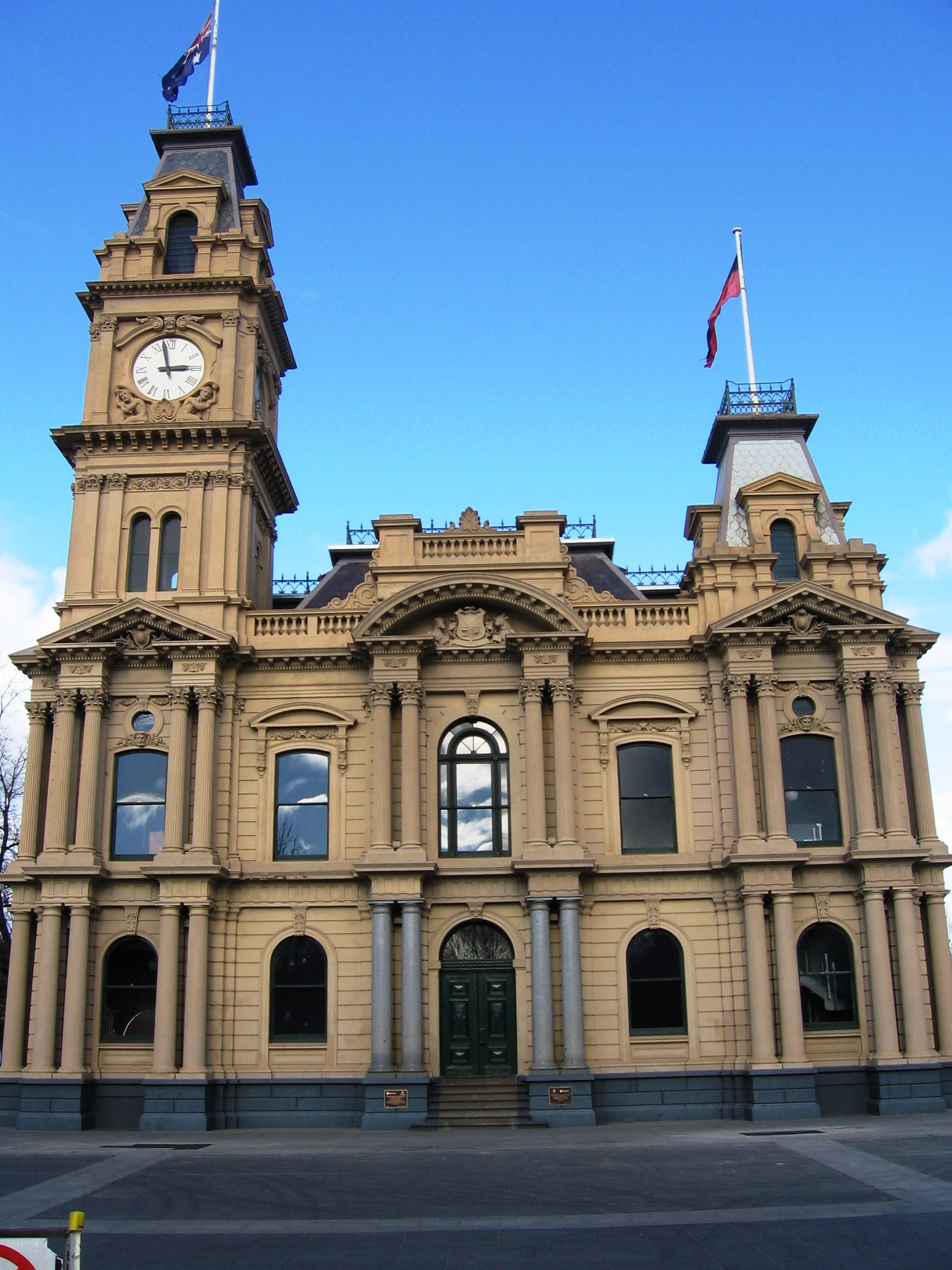
Bendigo Town Hall

=== Current composition ===
Composition of the Council of the City of Greater Bendigo by wards.

The council is composed of nine single member wards. The most recent election was held in October 2024.

Lockwood Ward has been vacant since 17 November 2025 when John McIlrath, who was elected at the 2024 election, resigned. He was succeeded by current councillor Donna Nicholas after a by-election held in March 2026.

The current council (elected in 2024)
Ward	Party	Councillor	Notes
Axedale	Independent Liberal	Shivali Chatley	
Eppalock	Independent	Aaron Spong	
Epsom	Independent	Andrea Metcalf	
Golden Square	Independent	Karen Corr	Deputy Mayor
Kennington	Independent Labor	Abhishek Awasthi	
Lake Weeroona	Independent	Thomas Prince	Mayor
Lockwood	Independent	Donna Nicholas	
Ravenswood	Independent Labor	Damien Hurrell	
Whipstick	Victorian Socialists	Owen Cosgriff	

== Administration and governance ==
The council meets in the council chambers at the council headquarters in the Bendigo Town Hall offices, which is also the location of the council's administrative activities. It also provides customer services at its administrative centre on Lyttleton Terrace in Bendigo and its service centres in Heathcote, Huntly and Marong and also on Hopetoun Street and St Andrews Avenue in Bendigo.

=== 2023 council election review ===
In the lead up to the 2024 Victorian local elections, The Victorian Electoral Commission conducted a review into the electoral structure of multiple Victorian councils, including the City of Greater Bendigo, The review found that the city should adopt nine single-councillor wards at the election, namely:

- Axedale Ward
- Eppalock Ward
- Epsom Ward
- Golden Square Ward
- Kennington Ward
- Lake Weeroona Ward
- Lockwood Ward
- Ravenswood Ward
- Whipstick Ward

== Towns, suburbs and localities ==
At the 2021 census, the city had a population of 121,470 up from 110,477 in the 2016 census

Population
Locality	2016	2021
Argyle	215	272
Ascot	1,968	2,571
Avonmore	43	42
Axe Creek	352	452
Axedale	802	984
Bagshot	288	355
Bagshot North	30	39
Barnadown	17	12
Bendigo	5,512	5,652
Big Hill	261	281
California Gully	4,363	4,476
Costerfield	75	70
Derrinal	49	99
Drummartin	38	42
Eaglehawk	5,691	5,538
Eaglehawk North	5	13
East Bendigo	2,092	2,246
Elmore	776	847
Emu Creek	359	376
Eppalock	685	746
Epsom	4,325	5,014
Flora Hill	3,955	3,989
Fosterville	63	57
Golden Gully	211	213
Golden Square	8,820	9,220
Goornong	654	718
Harcourt North^	265	291
Heathcote	2,793	2,962
Hunter	44	23
Huntly	2,379	3,585
Huntly North	43	46
Ironbark	1,095	1,163
Jackass Flat	1,141	1,907
Junortoun	3,201	3,862
Kamarooka^	92	89
Kangaroo Flat	10,394	11,328
Kennington	5,649	5,880
Kimbolton	73	96
Knowsley	160	168
Ladys Pass	111	118
Leichardt^	125	167
Lockwood	754	806
Lockwood South^	961	1,052
Long Gully	3,383	3,420
Longlea	506	570
Maiden Gully	4,992	5,407
Mandurang	641	753
Mandurang South	247	280
Marong^	1,416	2,005
Mia Mia^	178	213
Mount Camel	106	136
Myers Flat	459	545
Myrtle Creek^	67	68
Neilborough	290	379
North Bendigo	4,059	4,277
Quarry Hill	2,339	2,365
Ravenswood^	436	443
Raywood^	318	329
Redcastle^	68	67
Redesdale^	240	299
Sailors Gully	711	743
Sebastian^	217	251
Sedgwick	546	614
Shelbourne^	452	423
Spring Gully	3,000	3,092
Strathdale	5,663	5,756
Strathfieldsaye	5,428	6,850
Toolleen^	182	221
Wellsford	126	144
West Bendigo	375	378
Whipstick	10	18
White Hills	3,219	3,620
Wilsons Hill	77	88
Woodvale	449	556

^ – Territory divided with another LGA

== See also ==
- List of places of worship in the City of Greater Bendigo
- List of localities in Victoria
