= Calivil =

Calivil Victoria
- Coordinates: 36°15′11″S 144°5′3″E
- Population: 178 (2021 census)
- Postcode(s): 3473
- LGA(s): Shire of Loddon
- State electorate(s): Bendigo East; Murray Plains
- Federal division(s): Mallee

Calivil is a locality in the Shire of Loddon, Victoria, Australia. At the 2021 census, Calivil had a population of 178.

== History ==
Calivil was established as a farming settlement in Loddon district during the 1860s and 1870s. Although not situated on any major railway or road, its growth was supported by its position between the Waranga Western and Pyramid No. 1 water channels. Irrigation infrastructure played a significant role in shaping the area. The locality is interlaced with water channels, facilitating agricultural development. The name "Calivil" is believed to be derived from an Aboriginal word meaning "musk duck".

Schools were established in Calivil and Calivil North in 1878 and operated until the 1950s, when local education consolidated in nearby Dingee. A major turning point came with the completion of the Waranga Western Channel to the Loddon River in the early 1920s, which boosted agricultural productivity and supported population growth. The local Anglican community, initially holding services in the community hall, eventually raised funds to relocate a disused church building from Neilborough to serve as their place of worship.
