= Huntly North =

Huntly North Victoria
- Coordinates: 36°35′25″S 144°20′22″E
- Population: 46 (2021 census)
- Postcode(s): 3551
- LGA(s): City of Greater Bendigo
- State electorate(s): Bendigo East
- Federal division(s): Bendigo

Huntly North is locality in the City of Greater Bendigo, Victoria, Australia. At the 2021 census, Huntly North had a population of 46.
