= Kimbolton =

Kimbolton may refer to:

== Places ==
- Kimbolton, Cambridgeshire, town in Cambridgeshire, England
  - Kimbolton School
  - Kimbolton Castle
  - RAF Kimbolton, an airfield
  - Kimbolton railway station, former railway station
- Kimbolton, Herefordshire, village in Herefordshire, England
- Kimbolton, Ohio, census-designated place in Ohio, United States
- Kimbolton, New Zealand, village in North Island, New Zealand
- Kimbolton, Victoria, Locality in Victoria, Australia

== Other ==
- Kimbolton Fireworks, the UK's last fireworks manufacturer, based in Kimbolton, Cambridgeshire
