= Woodvale, Victoria =

Woodvale
- Suburb
- Interactive map of Woodvale
- Coordinates: 36°39′28″S 144°12′40″E
- Country: Australia
- State: Victoria
- City: Bendigo
- LGA: City of Greater Bendigo

Government
  - State electorate: Bendigo East
  - Federal division: Bendigo

Population
  - Total: 556 (2021 census)
- Postcode: 3556

Woodvale is a locality in the City of Greater Bendigo, Victoria, Australia. At the 2021 census, Woodvale had a population of 556.

== History ==
Woodvale was first occupied by the Dja Dja Wurrung people who called the area "Nerring". European colonisation of Woodvale began in 1845 when the locality was located in Myers Flat, Then known as "Myers Creek". When gold was discovered in 1852, the area became known as "Sydney Flat". In the 1920's Sydney Flat became known as "Woodvale".
