= Myers Flat =

Myers Flat may refer to:

- Myers Flat, California, US
- Myers Flat, Victoria, Australia
