= Sailors Gully =

- Suburb
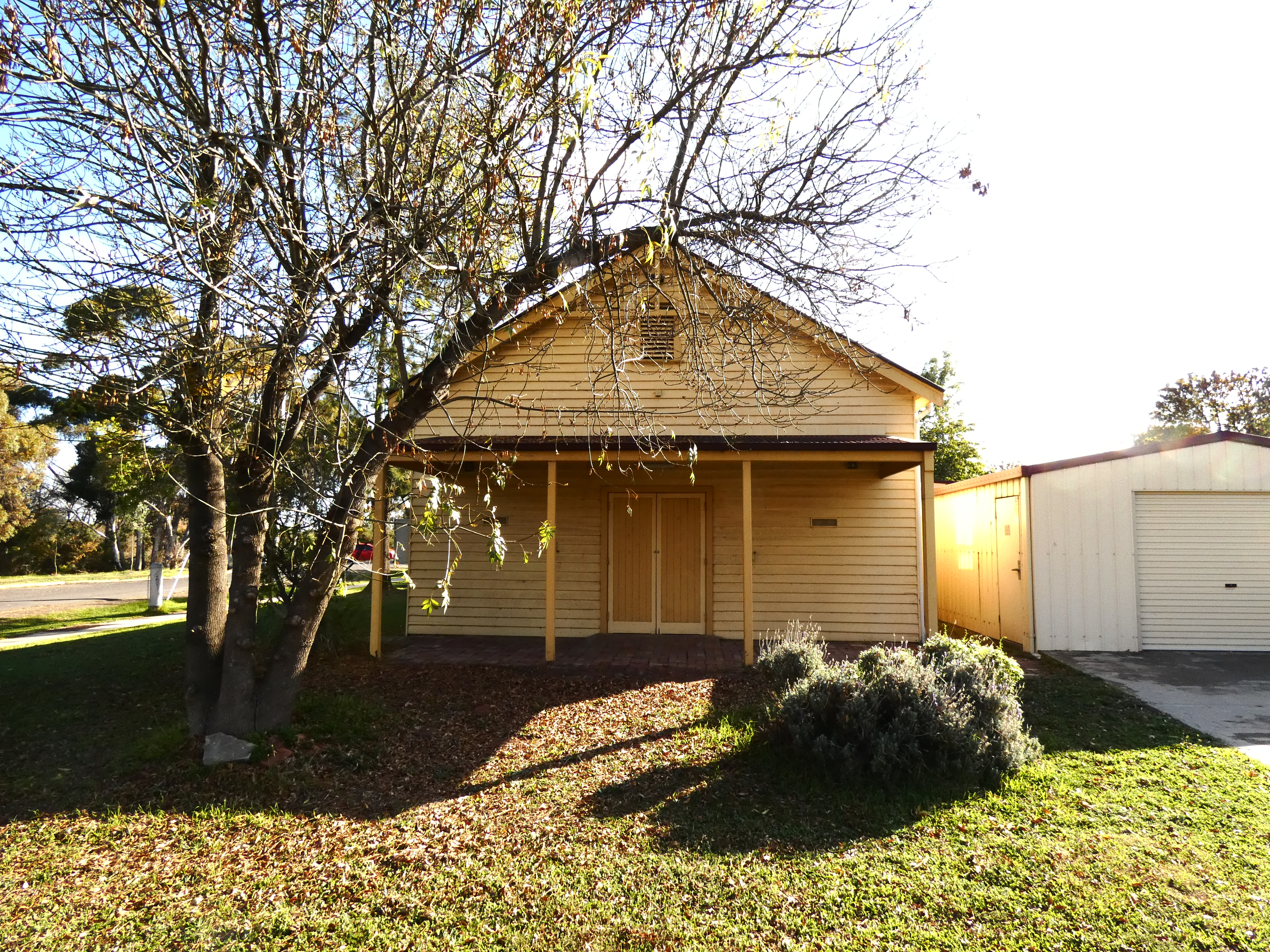
- Sailors Gully Hall, May 2026

- Interactive map of Sailors Gully
- Coordinates: 36°42′11″S 144°14′3″E
- Country: Australia
- State: Victoria
- City: Bendigo
- LGA: City of Greater Bendigo
- Location: 8.5 km (5.3 mi) NW of Bendigo

Government
  - State electorate: Bendigo East
  - Federal division: Bendigo

Population
  - Total: 743 (2021 census)
- Postcode: 3556

Sailors Gully is a suburb of the regional city of Bendigo in north central Victoria, Australia, 8.5 kilometres (5.3 mi) north west of the Bendigo city centre. At the 2021 census, Sailors Gully had a population of 743.

== History ==
Gold was first discovered in Sailors Gully in 1852, allegedly by a sailor or group of sailors who had abandoned their ships and headed to the goldfields. On 13 August 1855, a Church of England school was opened in Sailors Gully by Hugh Morrow. The following year, another building was built, serving as a church and a school. This second school (No. 570) was officially opened on 1 July 1874.
