= Avonmore, Victoria =

Avonmore
- Suburb
- Interactive map of Avonmore
- Coordinates: 36°32′6″S 144°31′50″E
- Country: Australia
- State: Victoria
- City: Bendigo
- LGA: City of Greater Bendigo

Government
  - State electorate: Bendigo East
  - Federal division: Bendigo

Population
  - Total: 42 (2021 census)
- Postcode: 3559

Avonmore is a locality in the City of Greater Bendigo, Victoria, Australia. At the 2021 census, Avonmore had a population of 42.

== Etymology ==
Avonmore was originally called "South Elmore", although the local community found it unsuitable due its similarity to Elmore. In 1910, Residents of South Elmore held a meeting to create a new name, where a farmer suggested the name "Avon". This was agreed upon with the addition of the second syllable of "more".
