= Wilsons Hill =

Wilsons Hill Bendigo, Victoria
- Coordinates: 36°43′27″S 144°6′2″E
- Population: 77 (2016 census)
- Postcode(s): 3515
- Elevation: 212 m (696 ft)
- LGA(s): City of Greater Bendigo
- State electorate(s): Bendigo West
- Federal division(s): Bendigo

Wilsons Hill is a locality in the City of Greater Bendigo in the Australian state of Victoria. The area was used for gold mining and filled in mineshafts can be found. In the south-western end of the Wilsons Hill Nature Conservation Reserve are the remains of four cyanide vats from gold processing in the 1930s.
