= Kangaroo Flat, Victoria =

Kangaroo Flat
- Suburb
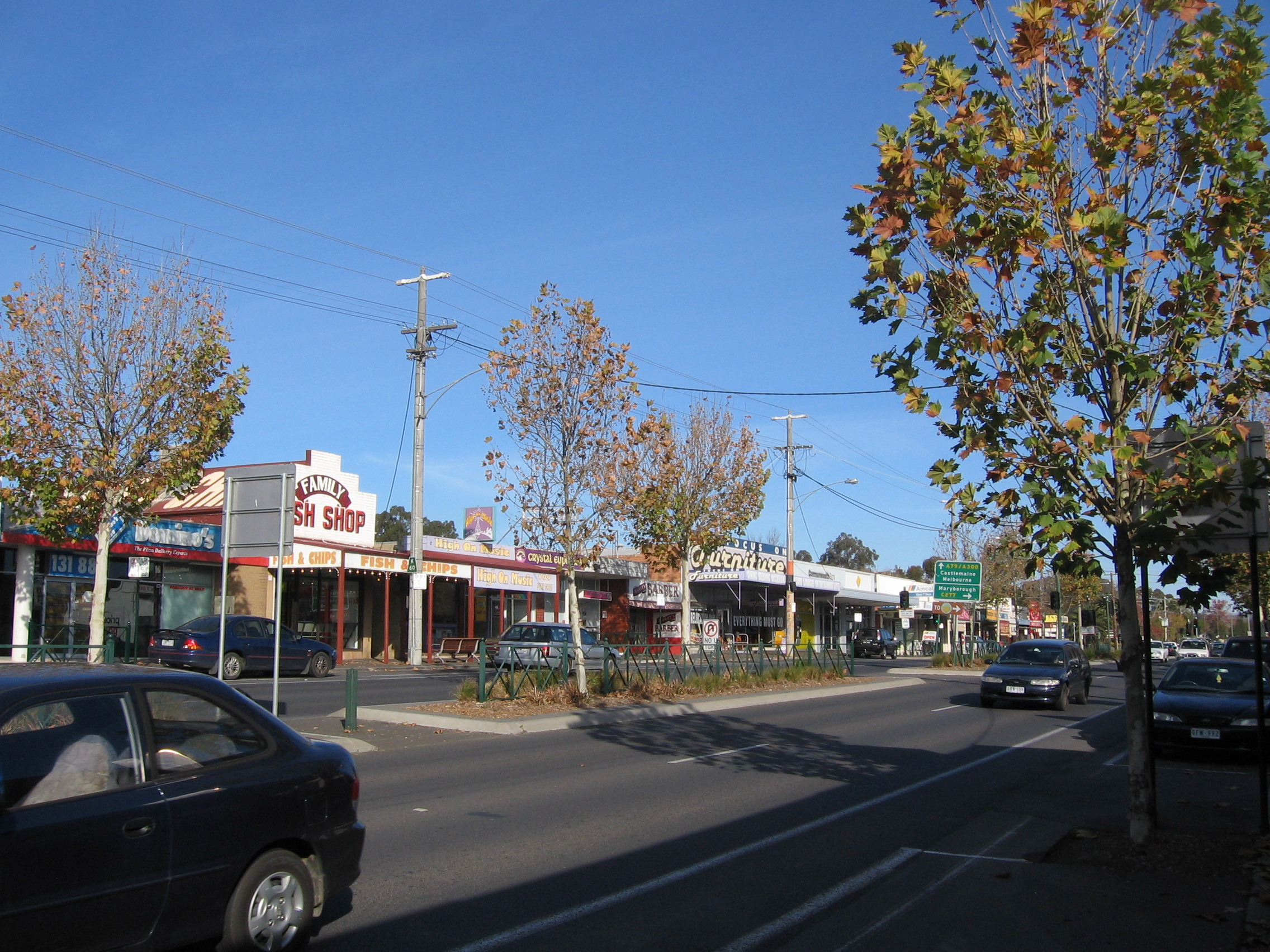
- Main street

- Interactive map of Kangaroo Flat
- Coordinates: 36°47′S 144°14′E
- Country: Australia
- State: Victoria
- City: Bendigo
- LGA: City of Greater Bendigo
- Location: 145 km (90 mi) from Melbourne; 5 km (3.1 mi) from Bendigo

Government
  - Federal division: Bendigo

Population
  - Total: 11,328 (2021 census)
- Postcode: 3555
Suburbs around Kangaroo Flat
Maiden Gully	Golden Square	Golden Gully
Lockwood	Kangaroo Flat	Mandurang
Ravenswood	Ravenswood	Mandurang

Kangaroo Flat is a suburb of Bendigo, located in Victoria, Australia. It is located 5 kilometres (3 miles) southwest of the Bendigo CBD. Kangaroo Flat is neighbours with Golden Square, Big Hill, Lockwood, Maiden Gully and Mandurang.

== Toponymy ==
The suburb was originally named Yankee Boot Flat, after the high boots the gold miners wore whilst mining in the area. The name of Kangaroo Flat was derived from one particular eastern grey kangaroo, who was surrounded and captured by the gold miners.

== History ==
Prior to the gold rush the Bendigo (called Sandhurst, in those days) district was part of a large sheep station known as "the Ravenswood Run". Discovery of gold deposits in the 1850s brought many miners to the region, looking to seek their fortune. People came from a number of overseas countries, such as England, Netherlands, Ireland, The United States of America, Germany and others. Large numbers came from mainland China. Chinese miners conducted searches of alluvial (surface level) and shallow mine-sites. Characteristically "round" Chinese digs are still able to be viewed in places such as Charcoal Gully, a bushland reserve located between Morrison and Thomas Streets to the southwest of Kangaroo Flat's town centre. This Chinese influence was at first resented by other diggers, many who came from European countries with little or no understanding of the Asian lifestyle. Concerted efforts by Chinese settlers to assist their adopted communities led to their being eventually embraced in the district.

Bendigo and satellite towns, including Kangaroo Flat, Golden Square, Eaglehawk and White Hills, sprung up essentially as tent cities. These gave way to more permanent structures and the current street layout was established by the 1880s. The Post Office opened on 2 February 1857.

The population of Kangaroo Flat itself decreased along with the rest of the "Sandhurst" region as the gold rush subsided, although the town has always maintained its own cultural heritage and identity. Kangaroo Flat is home to the Crusoe Reservoir, built during the gold rush to supply water to Bendigo's goldfields. Water for the reservoir came from a series of channels reaching as far south as Kyneton. Crusoe's filtration system included a lime/sand-based installation. The reservoir is open today as a recreation park and swimming beach.

At November 2016, with the town's population approaching 12,000 residents, local facilities have been upgraded to keep pace with community needs.

The Kangaroo Flat Fire Brigade was established in 1873 and initially operated out of a wooden station in Smith Street. The Brigade was established and equipped with funds donated from within the community. The Brigade moved to a new premise in Station Street in 1956 in part to facilitate a second fire fighting appliance (tanker). It has now relocated to a new site in Helm Street, adjacent to Charcoal Gully. The new fire station houses four firefighting appliances and facilities for its volunteer fire fighters. The Brigade will celebrate its 150th anniversary in 2023. The Country Fire Authority's District 2 Headquarters have been relocated, from their former site atop Bendigo's Fire Station, to the site of the old Don Murray's Windermere Hotel, at the intersection of Lockwood Road and Helm Street.

Kangaroo Flat itself has grown from its early beginnings. The 4-lane Calder Highway carries thousands of vehicles daily on a 90-minute trip to the nearby Victorian capital city of Melbourne and suburbs. Three shopping precincts cater to the growing demographic, and a restored and upgraded railway station allows commuters access to the V/Line train system linking Bendigo to Melbourne and other urban districts.

== Demographics ==
At the 2021 census, Kangaroo Flat had a population of 11,328. The median age of residents was 44 years, higher than the national median of 38 years. The population was composed of 47.2% males and 52.8% females.

Aboriginal and Torres Strait Islander peoples made up 2.5% of the population, higher than the Victorian average of 1.0% but slightly below the national average of 3.2%.

The median weekly household income in Kangaroo Flat was $1,144, with an average household size of 2.2 people. The median monthly mortgage repayment was $1,300, while the median weekly rent was $285. Households in the area had an average of 1.7 motor vehicles.

The majority of residents in Kangaroo Flat were Australian-born, accounting for 82.2% of the population. The most common countries of birth for those born overseas were England (1.7%), India (1.2%), Myanmar (1.1%), the Philippines (1.1%), and Thailand (0.6%). In terms of language, 84.5% of residents spoke only English at home. Other languages spoken included Karen (1.8%), Punjabi (0.7%), Mandarin, (0.5%), Tagalog (0.3%), and Filipino (0.3%).

The most common religious affiliation reported was "No Religion" (41.8%), followed by Catholic (18.6%), Anglican (9.4%) and Uniting Church (5.5%).

== Churches ==
A number of old churches, built in the mid-1800s, give testimony to a well-established community with strong British ties. St. Monica's Roman Catholic Church sits at the Northern end of Kangaroo Flat's busy "Main" business & shopping street, striking red brick & white masonry trim creating a unique landmark. The town's newly modernised Catholic primary school is located directly opposite on the corner of Station Street. The Kangaroo Flat Uniting Church, (formerly Methodist) occupies a similar prominent spot on the Southern approach to the main street. Standing in an elevated position in Camp Street, it looks west towards Lockwood Road and the town's famous farming district. The Kangaroo Flat Baptist Church is to be found in Church Street, just a short stroll from Camp Street. Formerly the Kangaroo Flat Presbyterian Church, it has a lasting and profound history in the local area.

St. Mary's Anglican Church, is situated further along Melbourne Road from the Uniting Church. A part of Kangaroo Flat since gold rush times, the original church was destroyed by a horrific fire in December 2008. Constructed around 1862, the main building had housed stone & timber tablets paying tribute to community members. A Flight Sergeant killed over England during the Second World War, a much-loved resident Minister, & a young girl from the parish flock; these & others commemorated on St. Mary's walls reinforced the importance of community itself within the church. A large oil painting in modern style, completed in the 1950s by Anne Moller, a young local girl, depicted the birth, crucifixion & resurrection of Jesus Christ. It formed a thematic above the altar, but was lost in the fire along with nearly all of the Parish's history. The church and community rallied to raise funds, and in mid-2014 a new, modern facility was opened where the original building had stood. It features a modern church and facilities with a purpose to serve the parish and community well into the future.

== Economy ==
The suburb has one shopping centre, Lansell Square, which is located on the Calder Highway to the south of the Kangaroo Flat main CBD. It was opened in 1979 with a K-Mart department store, Coles and Safeway (now known as Woolworths) supermarkets, in addition to 55 specialty stores. The centre received a development upgrade between 2014 and 2015.

== Sport ==
=== Australian rules football ===
A Kangaroo Flat football club was first formed in 1862, though it is unknown how long it lasted for. The present Kangaroo Flat Football Club was first formed in the 1890s, its most successful era being the 1920s. The club is the oldest established football club from the Golden City Football League to have been incorporated into the present Bendigo Football League in 1981. Their home ground is located at Dower Park. A junior league club for under 12s also exists.

Dower Park, Kangaroo Flat's principal sporting complex and home to the local football, cricket, bowling and swimming clubs, has been remodelled. A sports club with restaurant and gaming facilities was completed in recent years, as was a new grandstand on the western side of the oval. An indoor aquatic centre has been constructed in Browning Street, while a new Ambulance Station operates in View Street.

=== Other clubs ===
The Kangaroo Flat Mens Bowls Club was founded in 1945. In 1947, a Ladies club was also established. A wooden clubhouse was opened in 1953, with extensions completed in 1962 and 1972, when the clubhouse was rebuilt in brick.

The Kangaroo Flat Rifle Club was formed in 1861. During World War II, the club closed, until it reformed in 1948, although the Kangaroo Flat rifle range was not reopened. The club currently operates as the South Bendigo Rifle Club in the locality of Wellsford.

The clubhouse for the Kangaroo Flat Tennis Club was constructed in 1976.

== Public services ==
=== Education ===
Kangaroo Flat is home to the Kangaroos Football and Netball team in the Bendigo Football League, and a number of educational institutions; Crusoe Secondary College, Kangaroo Flat Primary School, St. Monica's Primary School, the Bendigo campus of Glenvale Primary School and Bendigo Special Development School.
