= Mount Camel =

Mount Camel Yiberithoop (Daungwurrung)
- Suburb
- Interactive map of Mount Camel
- Coordinates: 36°47′14″S 144°43′56″E
- Country: Australia
- State: Victoria
- City: Bendigo
- LGA: City of Greater Bendigo

Government
  - State electorate: Euroa
  - Federal division: Bendigo

Population
  - Total: 106 (2016 census)
- Postcode: 3523

Mount Camel is a locality in the City of Greater Bendigo, Victoria named for the nearby Mount Camel. The Ngurai-illamwurrung named for Mount Camel is "Yiberithoop".
