= Ladys Pass =

- Suburb
- Interactive map of Ladys Pass
- Coordinates: 36°49′10″S 144°41′20″E
- Country: Australia
- State: Victoria
- City: Bendigo
- LGA: City of Greater Bendigo

Government
  - State electorate: Euroa
  - Federal division: Bendigo

Population
  - Total: 111 (2016 census)
- Postcode: 3523

Ladys Pass is a locality in the City of Greater Bendigo, Victoria, Australia.

== Etymology ==
The origin of the name is attributed to two stories. One suggests that during the era of horse-drawn coaches, women would disembark and walk through the passage while men pushed the coach. Another recounts a story of bushrangers who, while holding up a coach at the creek crossing, courteously allowed the women to pass unharmed.
