= Eaglehawk North =

Eaglehawk North Bendigo, Victoria
- Coordinates: 36°42′49″S 144°15′12″E
- Population: 0 (2021 census)
- Postcode(s): 3556
- Location: 10 km (6 mi) NW of Bendigo
- LGA(s): City of Greater Bendigo
- State electorate(s): Bendigo East
- Federal division(s): Bendigo

Eaglehawk North is a locality in the City of Greater Bendigo in north central Victoria, Australia, 10 kilometres (6.2 mi) north west of the Bendigo city centre.

At the 2021 census, Eaglehawk North had a population of 0 residents.

In 1909, Eaglehawk North Primary School (No. 1428) opened.
