= Argyle, Victoria =

Argyle
- Suburb
- Interactive map of Argyle
- Coordinates: 36°56′46″S 144°43′30″E
- Country: Australia
- State: Victoria
- City: Bendigo
- LGA: City of Greater Bendigo

Government
  - State electorate: Bendigo East
  - Federal division: Bendigo

Population
  - Total: 272 (2021 census)
- Postcode: 3551

Argyle is a locality in the City of Greater Bendigo in the Australian state of Victoria. At the 2021 census, Argyle had a population of 272. Argyle is named after a district pioneer.
