= Myrtle Creek, Victoria =

Myrtle Creek
- Suburb
- Interactive map of Myrtle Creek
- Coordinates: 36°55′39″S 144°23′50″E
- Country: Australia
- State: Victoria
- City: Bendigo
- LGAs: City of Greater Bendigo; Mount Alexander Shire

Government
  - State electorate: Bendigo East
  - Federal division: Bendigo

Population
  - Total: 67 (2016 census)
- Postcode: 3551

Myrtle Creek is a locality in the City of Greater Bendigo and Mount Alexander Shire, Victoria.
