= Hunter, Victoria =

Hunter
- Suburb
- Interactive map of Hunter
- Coordinates: 36°26′35″S 144°30′20″E
- Country: Australia
- State: Victoria
- City: Bendigo
- LGA: City of Greater Bendigo

Government
  - State electorate: Bendigo East
  - Federal division: Bendigo

Population
  - Total: 23 (2021 census)
- Postcode: 3558

Hunter is a locality in the City of Greater Bendigo, Victoria, Australia. At the 2021 census, Hunter had a population of 23.

== Etymology ==
Hunter was named after Mr. Hunter of Burnewang Station.
