= Bagshot North =

- Town
- Coordinates: 36°36′1″S 144°24′42″E
- Country: Australia
- State: Victoria
- LGA: City of Greater Bendigo

Government
  - State electorate: Bendigo East
  - Federal division: Bendigo

Population
  - Total: 39 (2021 census)
- Postcode: 3551

Bagshot North is a locality in the City of Greater Bendigo, Victoria, Australia. At the 2021 census, Bagshot North had a population of 39.
