= Sedgwick, Victoria =

Sedgwick
- Suburb
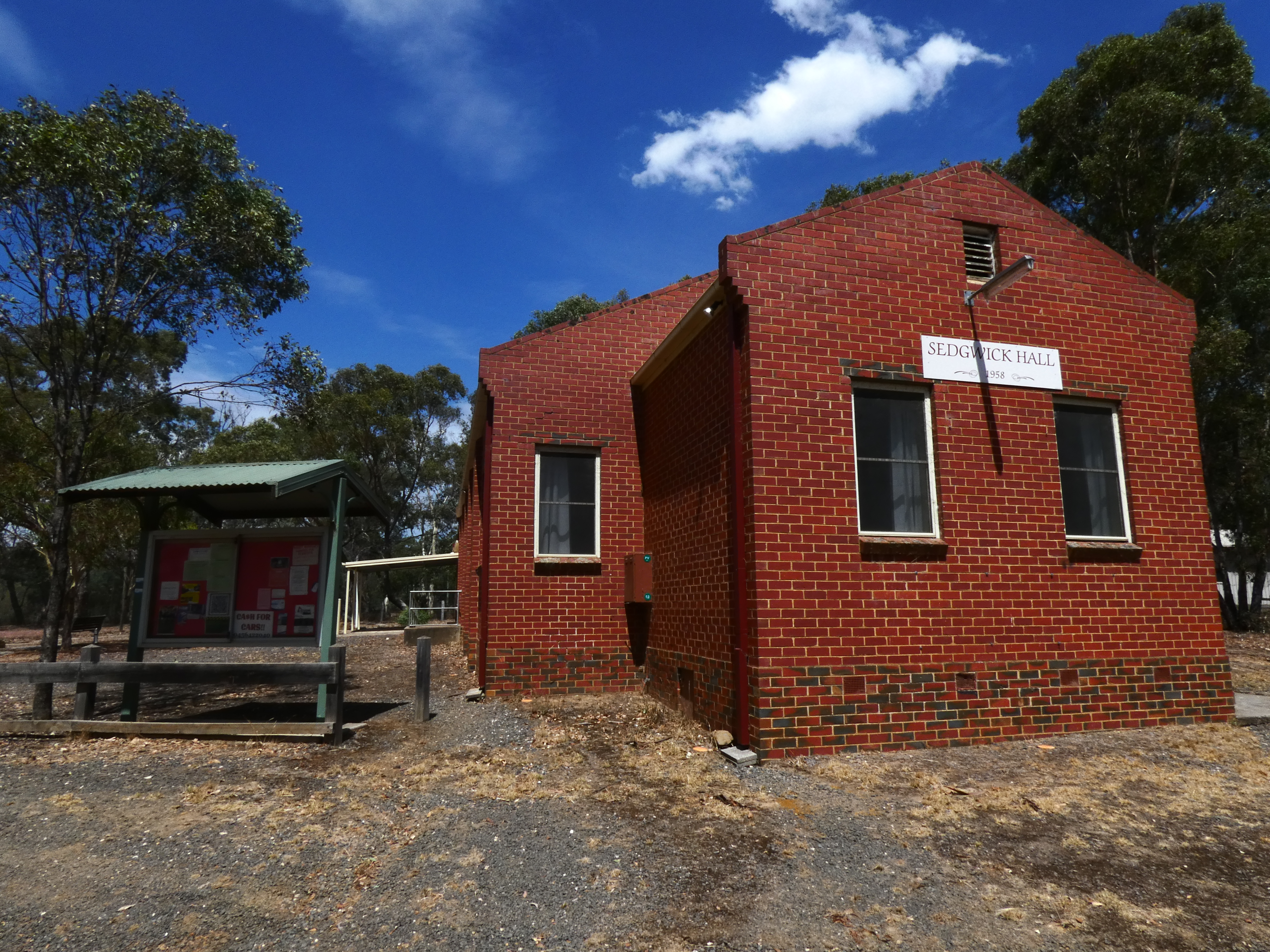
- Sedgwick Hall in February 2025

- Interactive map of Sedgwick
- Coordinates: 36°52′17″S 144°18′55″E
- Country: Australia
- State: Victoria
- City: Bendigo
- LGA: City of Greater Bendigo
- Established: 1854

Government
  - State electorate: Bendigo East
  - Federal division: Bendigo

Population
  - Total: 614 (2021 census)
- Postcode: 3551

Sedgwick is a locality in the City of Greater Bendigo, Victoria, Australia.

Facilities include a public hall that opened in 1958 and CFA Rural fire station.

== History ==
Sedgwick was named "Upper Emu Creek" until 1901, when it was renamed as Sedgwick after British geologist Adam Sedgwick.

The first freehold land was granted in 1854. In 1863 The Great Eastern Mine was founded in Sedgwick. Many of the miners lived in the area around the mine so there was a hotel called the Great Eastern and a store. It was the only mine in the district. A Methodist chapel opened on the 9th of April 1873 and was in use until 1920. In 1877 a water channel running from Malmsbury to Bendigo was completed, running through the southern and western sides of Sedgwick; it still exists today.

In a public meeting in 1942, it was proposed that a bush fire brigade should be formed. The last major bush fire to burn through Sedgwick was in 1944 and burnt from Ravenswood to near Kyneton however they still have fought many smaller fires in Sedgwick and numerous larger fires in places such as Mount Macedon and Maryborough.

According to Victorian Municipal Directory 1976:

Horticultural district on Emu Creek, with post, telegraph and telephone office, and orchards. Mount Herbert, The Springs and the Coliban channel waterworks are favourite picnic resorts; school, hall. Rail to Bendigo, thence 14 Km. Postcode 3551

Most of the facilities mentioned in the Directory have since been closed and Mount Herbert is now located in Mandurang South due to locality boundary changes.

== Gallery ==
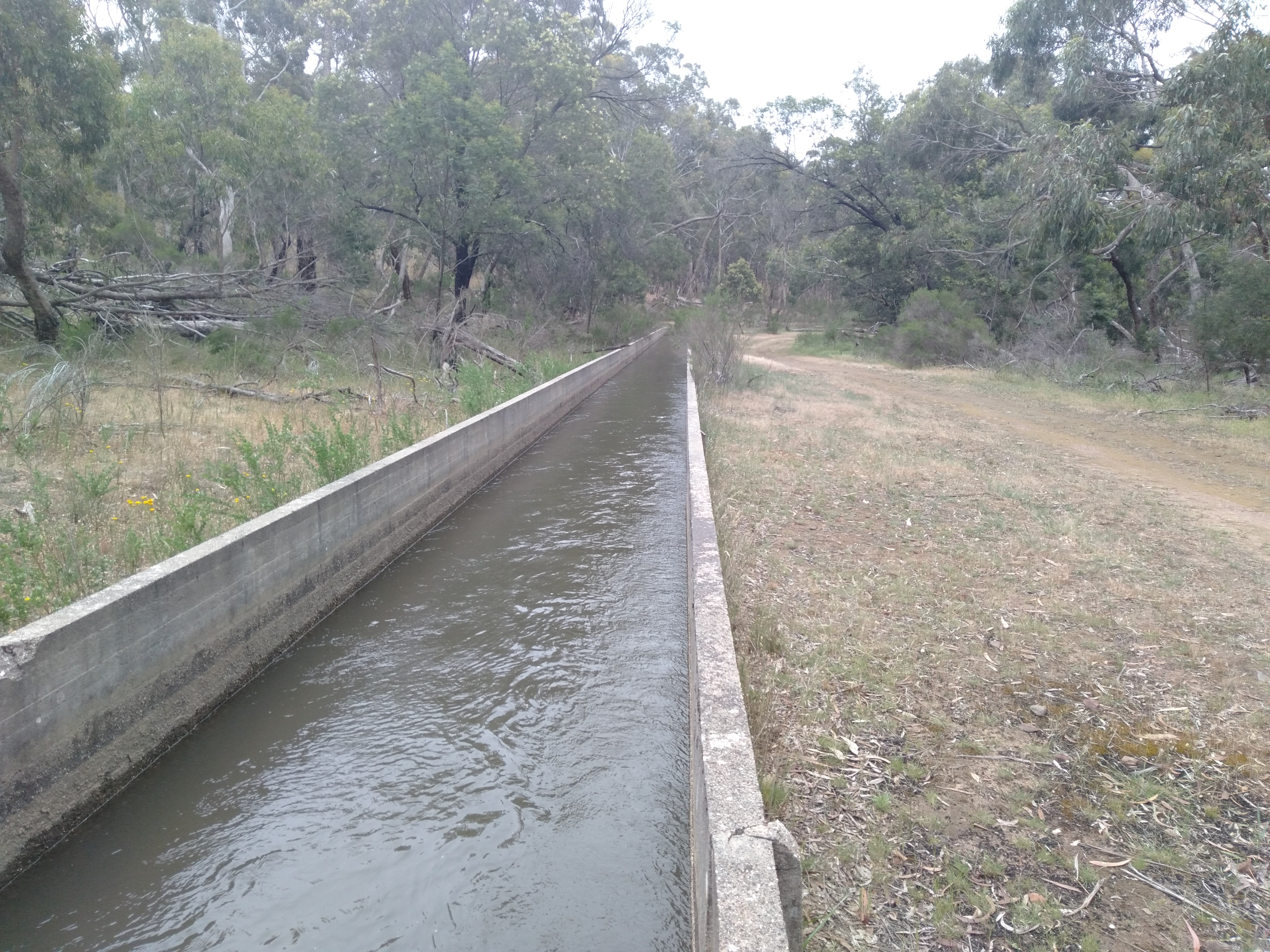
Sedgwick Section of the Bendigo to Malmsbury Channel

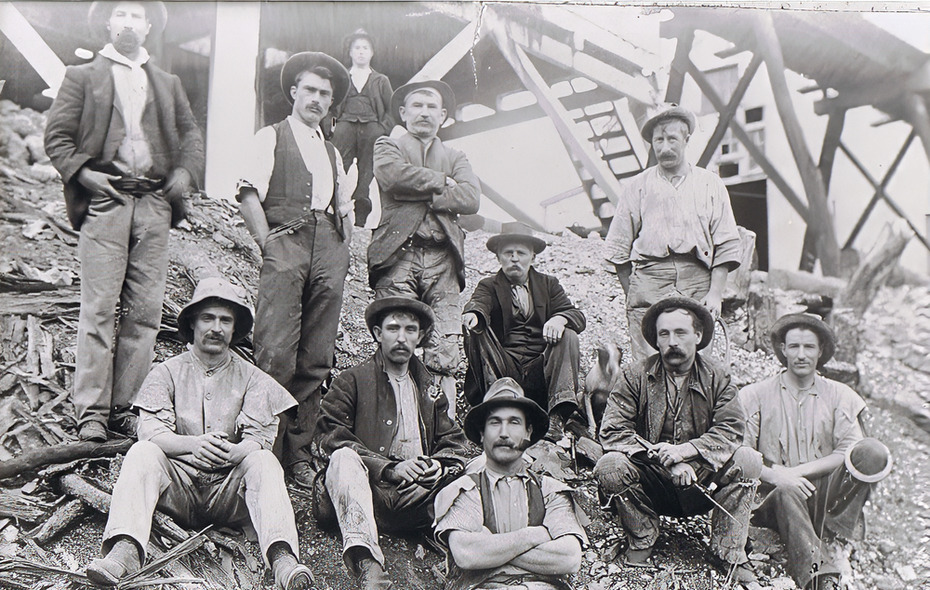
Miners from the Sedgwick Gold Mine in 1909

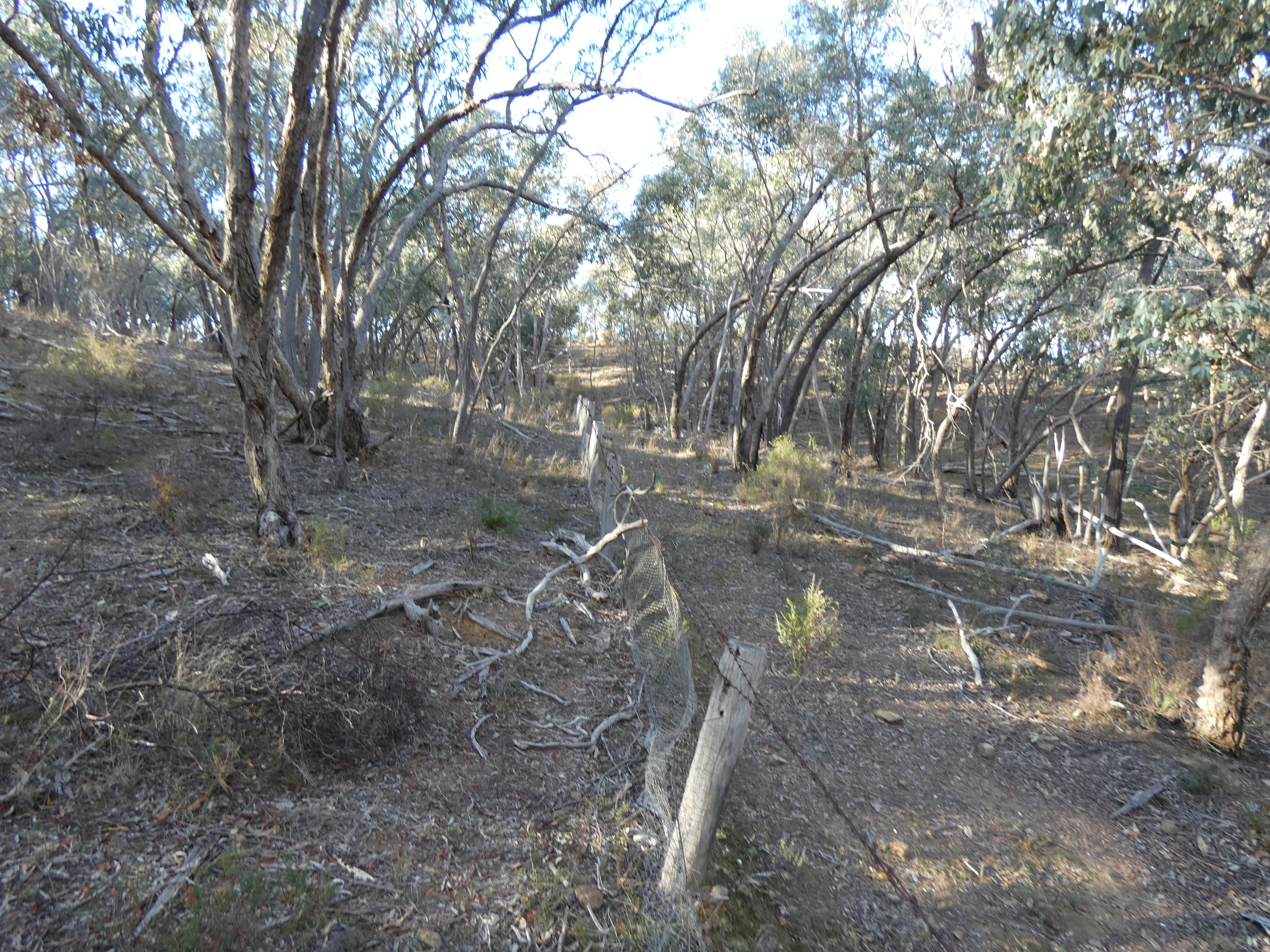
Fence at the edge of Sedgwick State Forest

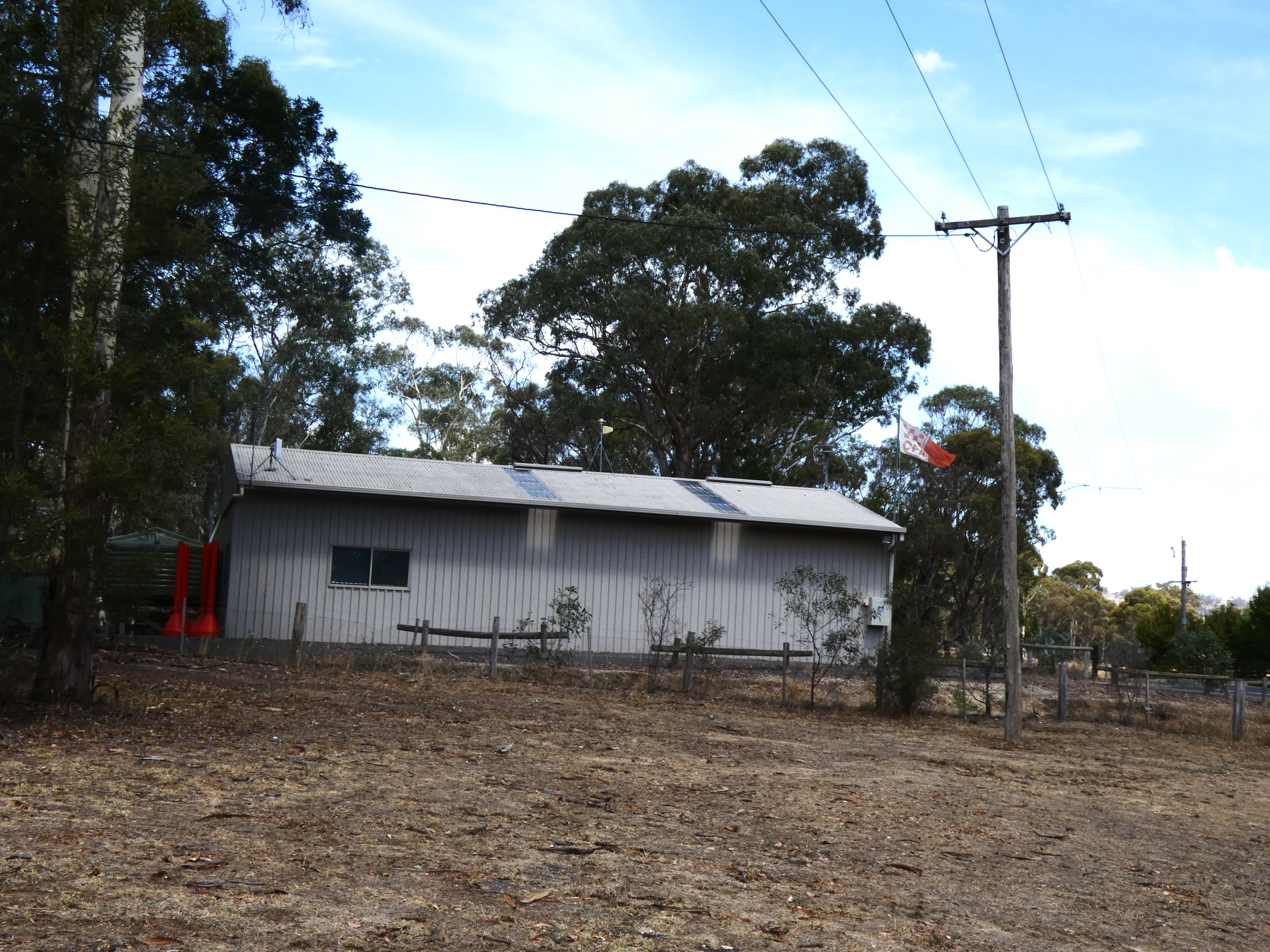
Fire station in Sedgwick

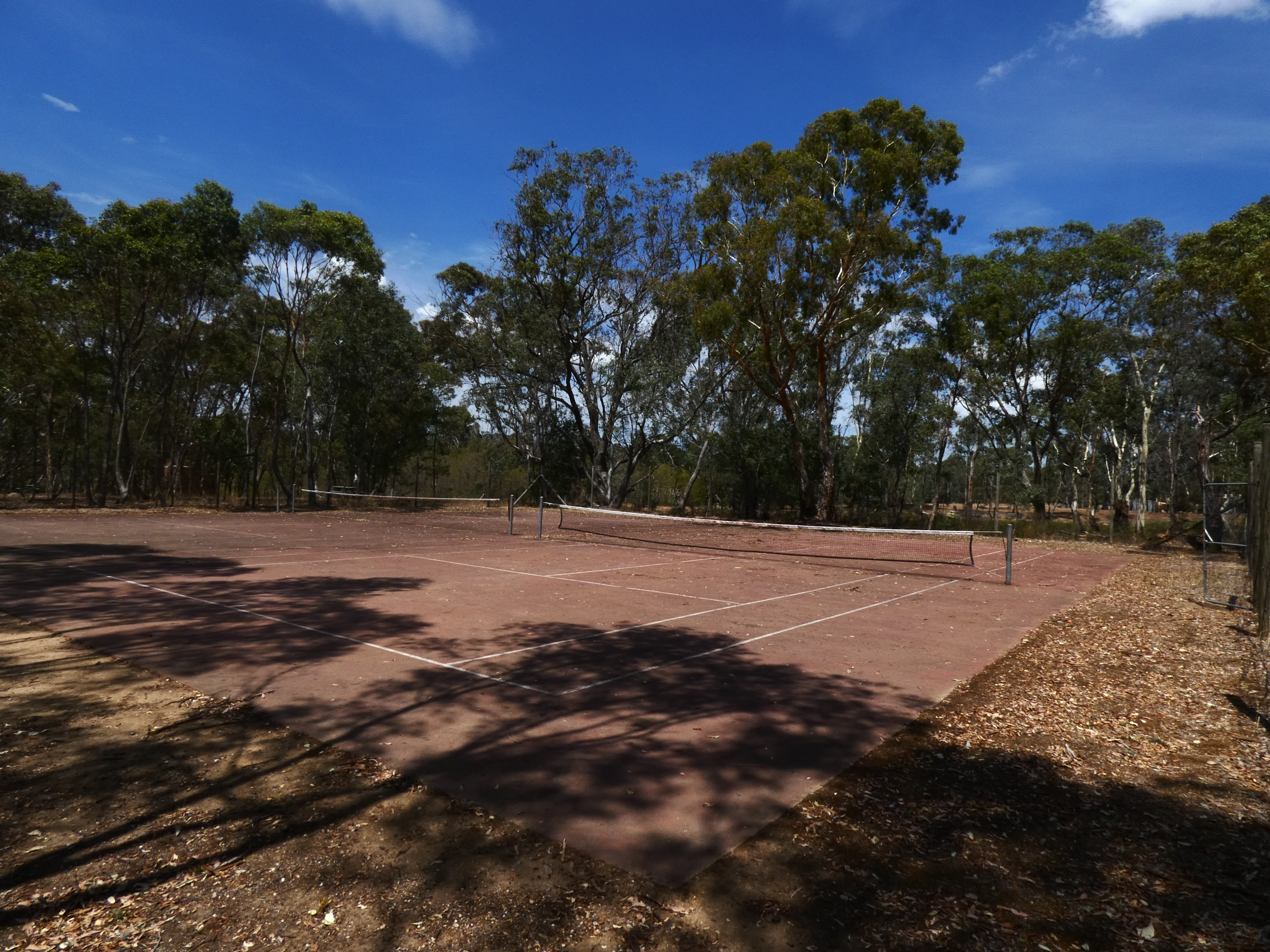
Tennis Court in Sedgwick
