= Mandurang South =

- Town
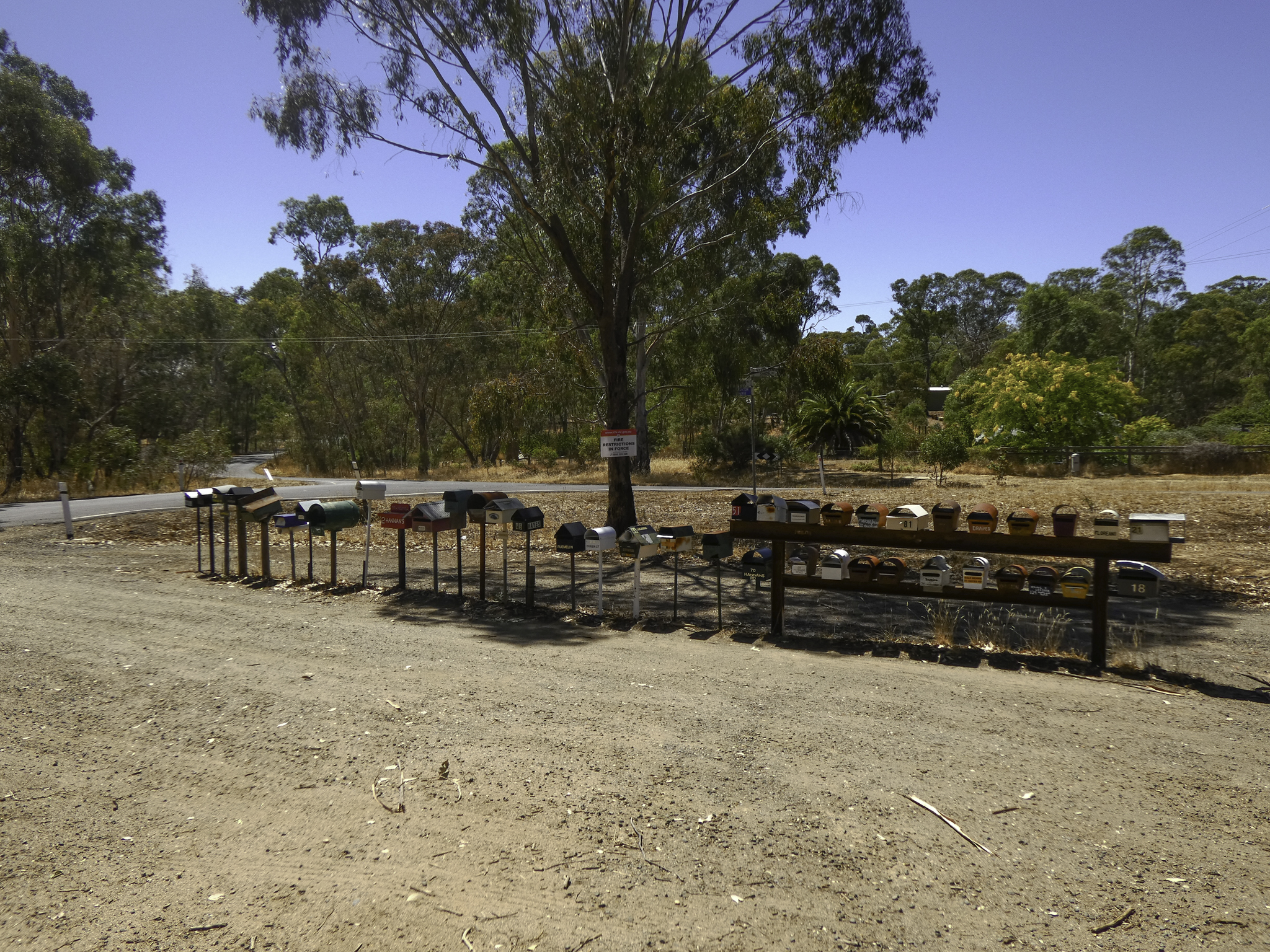
- Letterboxes in Mandurang South, February 2026

- Interactive map of Mandurang South
- Coordinates: 36°51′20″S 144°16′35″E
- Country: Australia
- State: Victoria
- City: Bendigo
- LGA: City of Greater Bendigo

Government
  - State electorate: Bendigo East
  - Federal division: Bendigo

Population
  - Total: 29 (2021 census)
- Postcode: 3551

Mandurang South is a locality in the City of Greater Bendigo, Victoria, Australia. At the 2021 census, Mandurang South had a population of 280.
