= Derrinal =

- Suburb
- Interactive map of Derrinal
- Coordinates: 36°52′48″S 144°38′39″E
- Country: Australia
- State: Victoria
- City: Bendigo
- LGA: City of Greater Bendigo

Government
  - State electorate: Euroa
  - Federal division: Bendigo

Population
  - Total: 99 (2021 census)
- Postcode: 3523

Derrinal is a locality in the City of Greater Bendigo, Victoria, Australia. At the 2021 census, Derrinal had a population of 99.

== History ==
Derrinal Station was purchased in 1854 by William Speed from Mr Patterson. Speed later sold the run to A. L. Wilton, who constructed a homestead near the creek and resided there for several years before moving to Melbourne. Wilton served as a justice of the peace and was a member of the local shire council.

Speed later established the Gold Bag Hotel at the Derrinal homestead and subsequently built the Sportsman's Arms Hotel after gold diggings began on land he owned near McIvor Creek. The hotel became a local centre for events including annual races. The Derrinal Run extended from the junction of the McIvor and Wild Duck creeks to the Major's Line near the McIvor Inn.

Derrinal railway station, originally named Wild Duck, opened on the Heathcote railway line on 1 October 1888 and served the locality until its closure in December 1958.

On 30 October 1900, a man believed to be an engine driver from Fosterville named Howe died after being thrown from a horse in the yard of Derrinal railway station.
