= Emu Creek, Victoria =

Emu Creek
- Suburb
- Interactive map of Emu Creek
- Coordinates: 36°50′16″S 144°21′0″E
- Country: Australia
- State: Victoria
- City: Bendigo
- LGA: City of Greater Bendigo
- Location: 141.7 km (88.0 mi) from Melbourne; 99.2 km (61.6 mi) from Echuca; 13.8 km (8.6 mi) from Bendigo

Government
  - State electorate: Bendigo East
  - Federal division: Bendigo

Population
  - Total: 359 (2016 census)
- Time zone: AEDT
- Postcode: 3551

Emu Creek is a locality in Victoria, Australia in the City of Greater Bendigo local government area, 141.7 kilometres north of the state capital, Melbourne. At the 2016 census, Emu Creek had a population of 359.
