= Wellsford, Victoria =

Wellsford
- Suburb
- Interactive map of Wellsford
- Coordinates: 36°40′53″S 144°22′23″E
- Country: Australia
- State: Victoria
- City: Bendigo
- LGA: City of Greater Bendigo

Government
  - State electorate: Bendigo East
  - Federal division: Bendigo
- Elevation: 182 m (597 ft)

Population
  - Total: 126 (2016 census)
- Postcode: 3551

Wellsford is a locality in the City of Greater Bendigo, Victoria, Australia. Wellsford was named after a farm in the area called "Wellsford Park". Wellsford is known for its rich gold mining after gold was discovered there in 1851 and it had a strong eucalyptus oil extractionindustry. The remaments of these industries can still be seen.
