= Golden Gully =

- Town
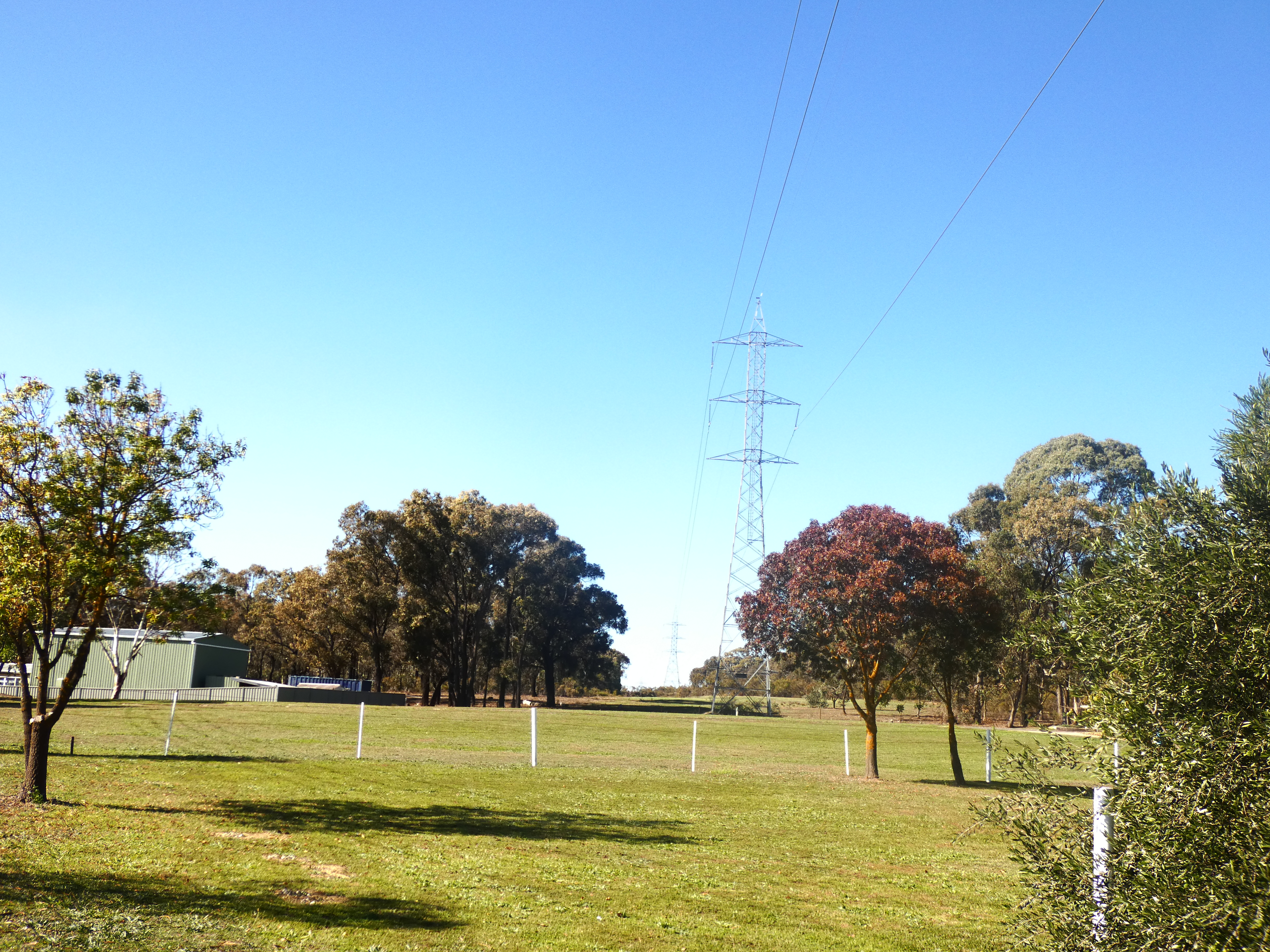
- Golden Gully, May 2026

- Coordinates: 36°47′30″S 144°15′54″E
- Country: Australia
- State: Victoria
- LGA: City of Greater Bendigo

Government
  - State electorate: Bendigo East
  - Federal division: Bendigo

Population
  - Total: 213 (2021 census)
- Postcode: 3555

Golden Gully is a suburb in the City of Greater Bendigo, Victoria, Australia. At the 2021 census, Golden Gully had a population of 213.

== History ==
Golden Gully was one of the first sites of gold discovery on the Bendigo goldfield, dating back to the early 1850s. The area was initially worked by diggers, then by puddlers, and later by dredgers and sluicers. In 1860, the Golden Gully Quartz Mining and Steam Crushing Company reported a profit of £265 from its first two months of operation, with over 100 tons of quartz awaiting crushing.

The Belle Vue Hotel was operating in Golden Gully during this period. The building was later unoccupied for some time before being destroyed by fire in 1874.

By 1893, the district was largely deserted. According to the Bendigo Advertiser, the name "Golden Gully" had acquired "a rather unsavory odor" due to speculative mining ventures, particularly during the London G.G. period. In such ventures, companies acquired mining claims but did not develop them, having raised money from investors while performing little or no actual work. The newspaper described their policy as "take-the-money-but-do-nothing". In contrast, mine owner George Lansell was credited with helping to restore confidence in the area by undertaking genuine development work, including overhauling the G.G. Consolidated mine and crosscutting at 1,065 feet for a reef.

In December 1936, it was reported that a sluicing party had "worked out" Golden Gully after 20 years of continuous operations. Their work extended over a mile along the gully, south from where the first gold rush began. The party reportedly recovered many relics, including old coins and camp utensils from the early 1850s, and had enjoyed a profitable period.

The Bendigo Ice Skating Rink was opened in Golden Gully in 1986 and closed in 2012 after having financial problems. Its closure marked the end of the last facility of its kind in regional Victoria. In 2008 after the City of Greater Bendigo gave a $100,000 loan to the rink, councillor Rod Fyffe, who was the council's representative on the Bendigo Ice Skating Stadium Committee described the rink as a valuable asset that the community needed to keep alive.

== Demographics ==
As of the 2021 Australian census, 213 people resided in Golden Gully, up from 211 in the 2016 census. The median age of persons in Golden Gully was 41 years. There were more males than females, with 52.9% of the population male and 47.1% female. The average household size was 2.6 people per household.
