= Sebastian, Victoria =

Sebastian Bendigo, Victoria
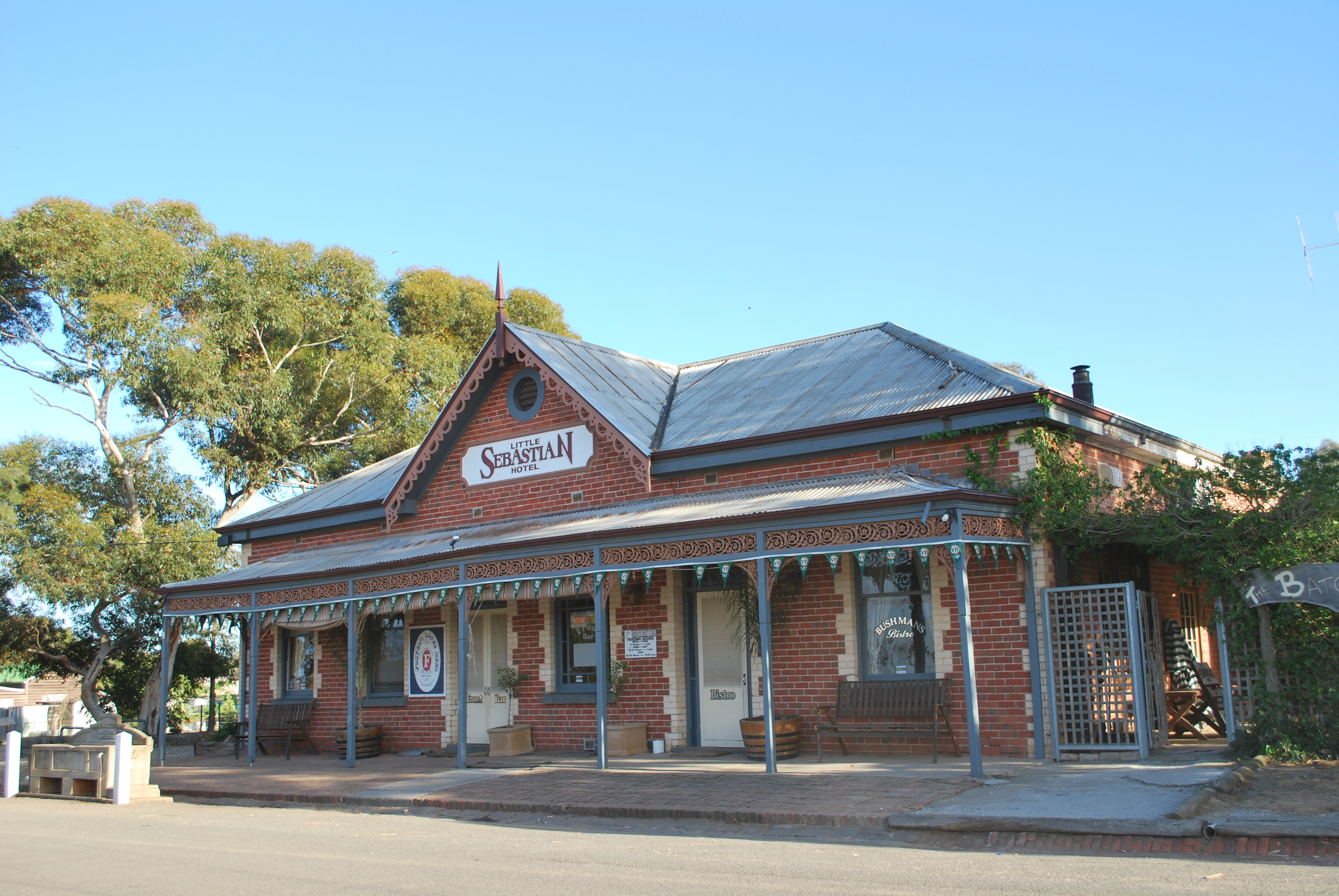

- Coordinates: 36°35′40″S 144°11′8″E
- Population: 251 (2021 census)
- Postcode(s): 3556
- LGA(s): City of Greater Bendigo
- State electorate(s): Bendigo East
- Federal division(s): Bendigo; Mallee

Sebastian is a town in northern Victoria, Australia. The town is located 22 km north of Bendigo and is in the City of Greater Bendigo.

== History ==
The town was named after Sebastian Schmidt, who discovered gold there in May 1863.

The railway line through Sebastian was opened in 1882 and eventually made it to Swan Hill.

Sebastian Primary School (No. 1510) closed in 1993. Students were transferred to Eaglehawk North Primary School the following year.

== Demographics ==
As of the 2021 Australian census, 251 people resided in Sebastian, up from 217 in the 2016 census. The median age of persons in Sebastian was 40 years. There were more males than females, with 51.4% of the population male and 48.6% female. The average household size was 2.7 people per household.
