= Neilborough =

Neilborough Bendigo, Victoria
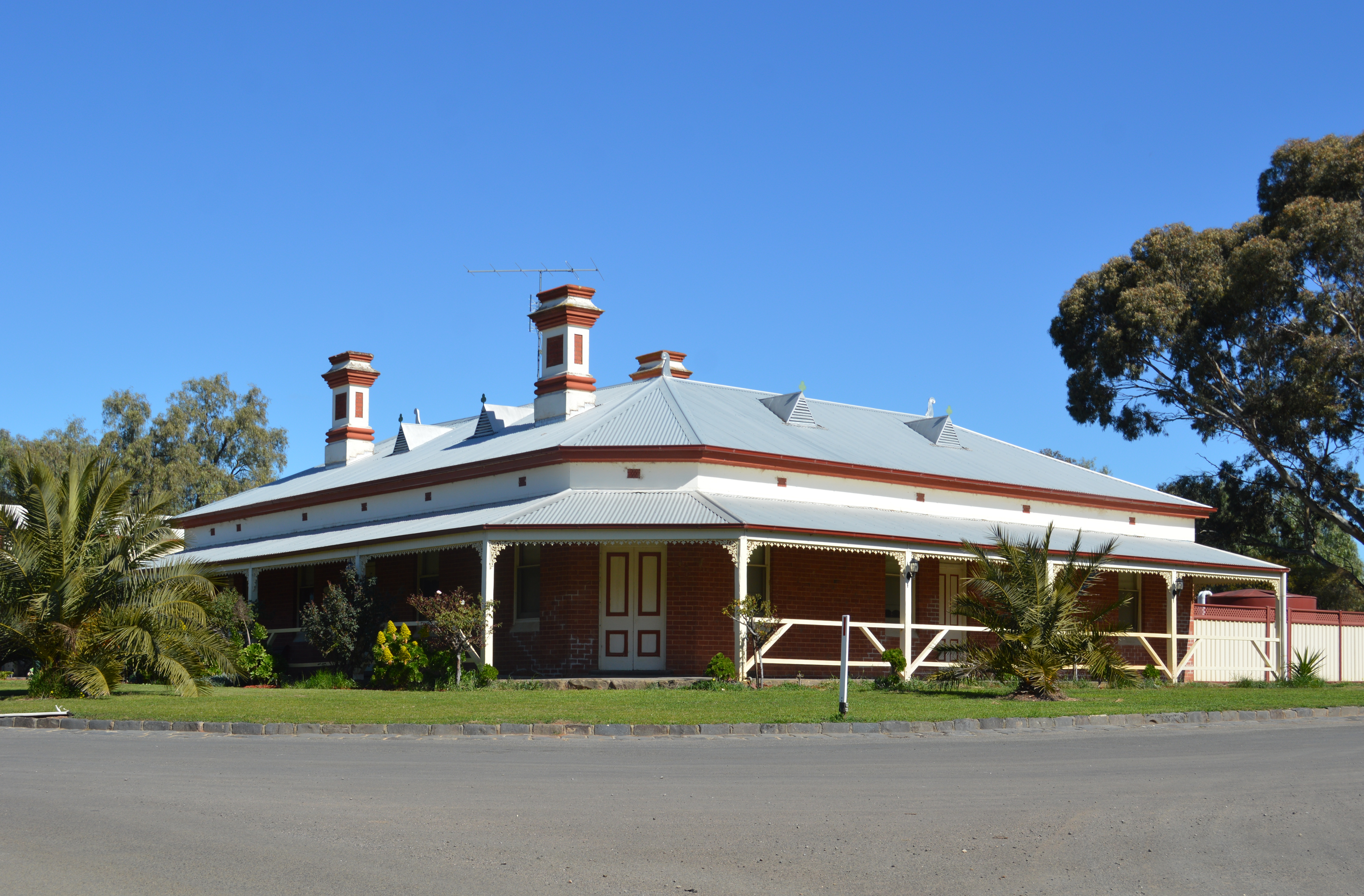
- The former Shamrock Hotel at Neilborough, 2015

- Coordinates: 36°33′53″S 144°14′10″E
- Population: 290 (2016 census)
- Postcode(s): 3570
- Location: 180 km (112 mi) N of Melbourne; 27 km (17 mi) N of Bendigo; 5 km (3 mi) NW of Raywood
- LGA(s): City of Greater Bendigo
- State electorate(s): Bendigo East
- Federal division(s): Bendigo

Neilborough is a locality in north central Victoria, Australia. The locality is in the City of Greater Bendigo local government area, 180 kilometres (110 mi) north of the state capital, Melbourne.

At the 2016 census, Neilborough had a population of 290.
