= Lockwood South =

- Suburb
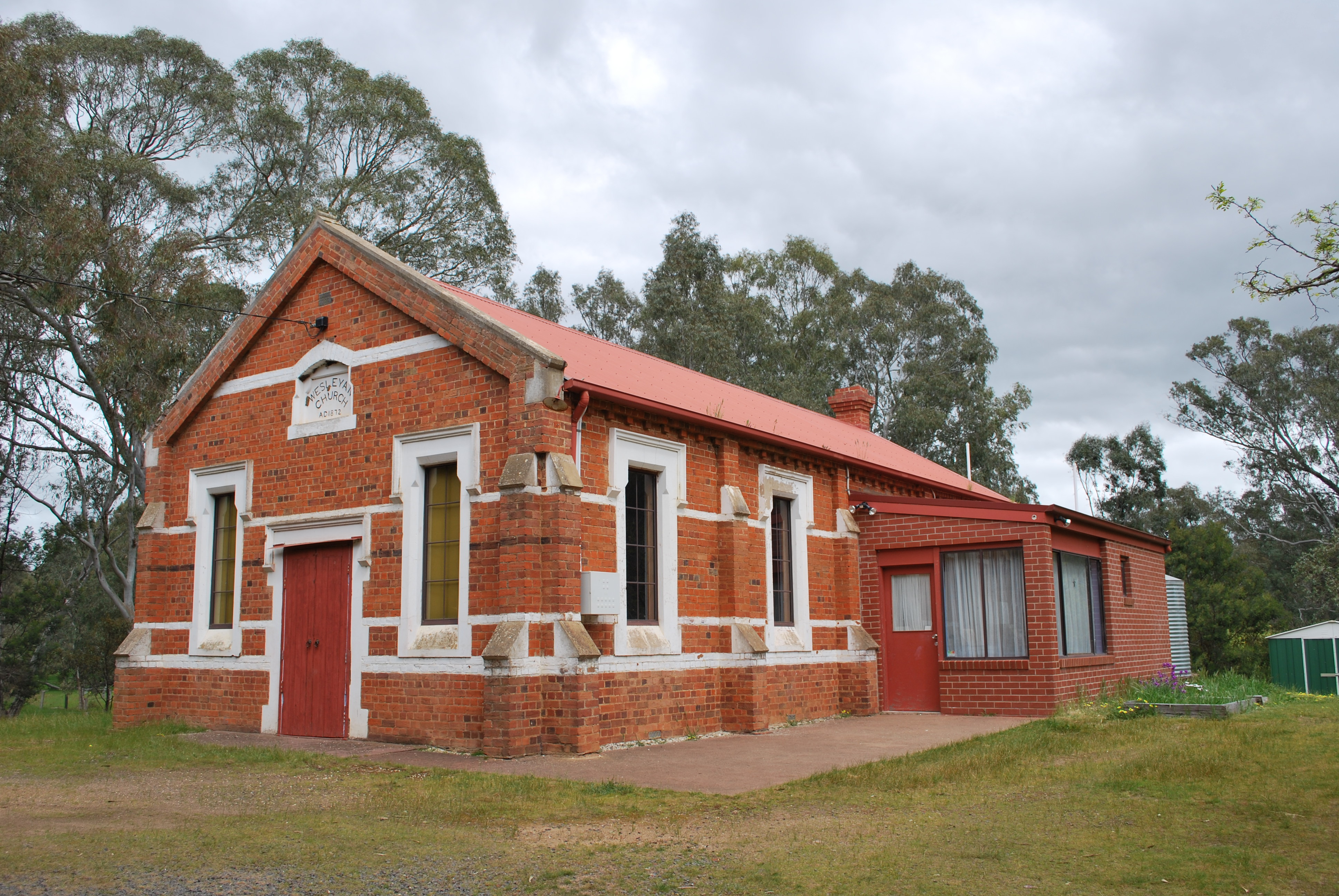
- Church in Lockwood South

- Interactive map of Lockwood South
- Coordinates: 36°51′4″S 144°9′16″E
- Country: Australia
- State: Victoria
- City: Bendigo
- LGA: City of Greater Bendigo

Government
  - State electorate: Bendigo West
  - Federal division: Bendigo

Population
  - Total: 1,052 (2021 census)
- Postcode: 3551

Lockwood South is a locality in the City of Greater Bendigo and Mount Alexander Shire, Victoria, Australia. At the 2021 census, Lockwood South had a population of 1,052.

== History ==
The first school in Lockwood South was opened in 1859 and a Wesleyan Church was built in 1872 which is now a Uniting Church. A public hall was built in the late nineteenth century and is still in use today.

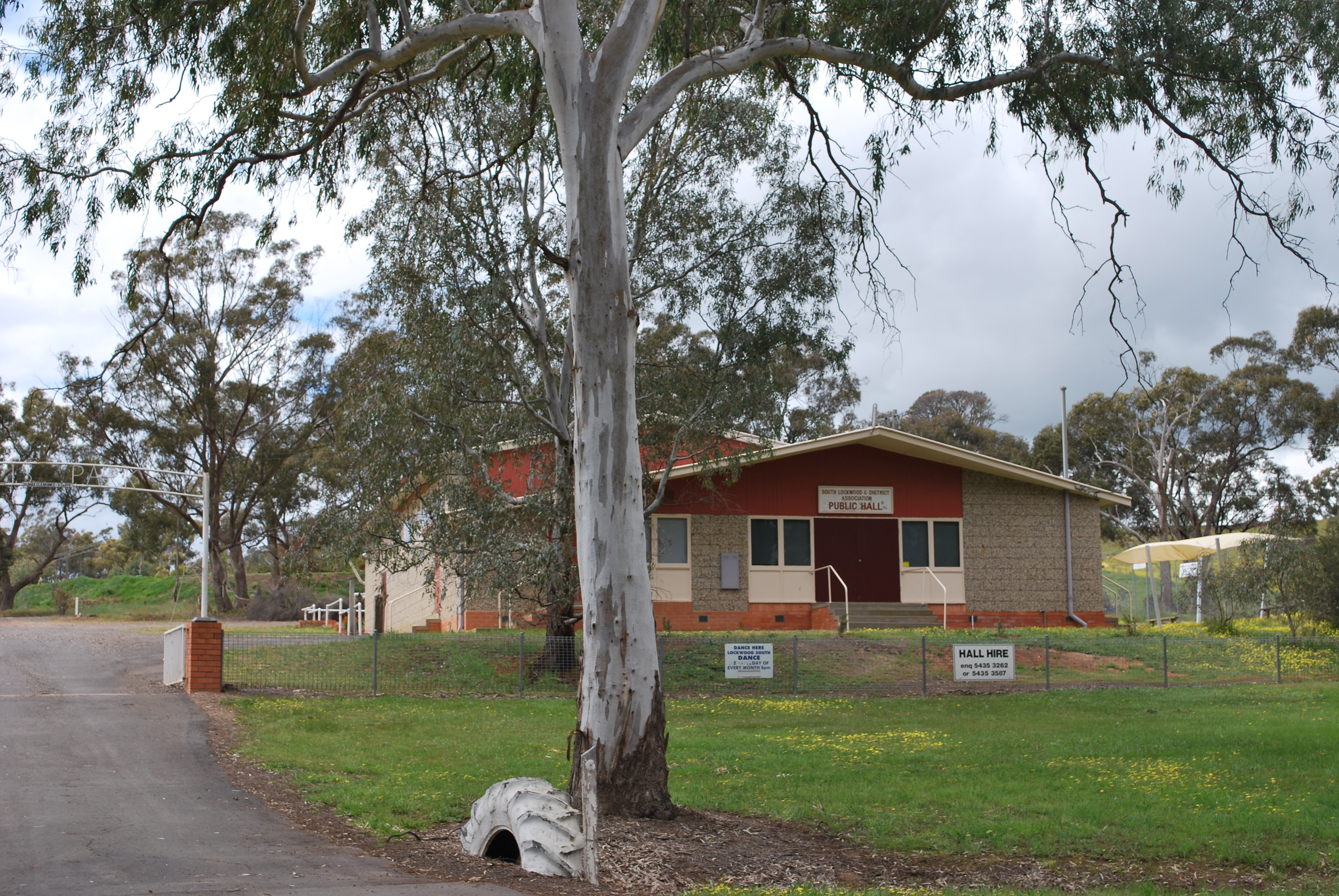
Lockwood South Public hall
