= Golden Square, Victoria =

Golden Square
- Suburb
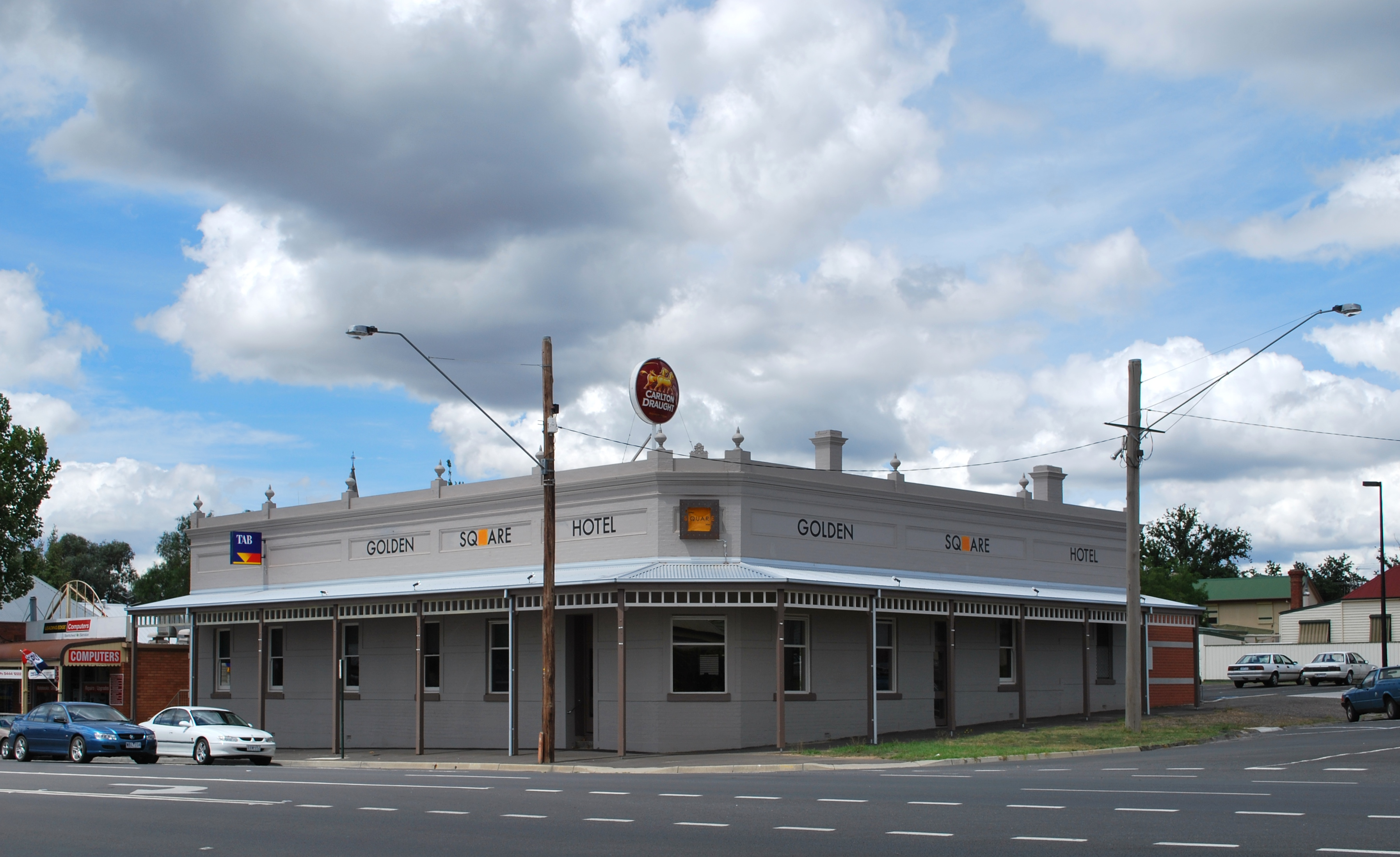
- Golden Square Hotel

- Interactive map of Golden Square
- Coordinates: 36°46′S 144°15′E
- Country: Australia
- State: Victoria
- City: Bendigo
- LGA: City of Greater Bendigo
- Location: 147 km (91 mi) NW of Melbourne; 3 km (1.9 mi) SW of Bendigo

Population
  - Total: 9,220 (2021 census)
- Postcode: 3555
Suburbs around Golden Square
West Bendigo	Ironbark	Bendigo CBD
Maiden Gully	Golden Square	Quarry Hill
Kangaroo Flat	Kangaroo Flat	Golden Gully

Golden Square is a suburb of Bendigo in Victoria, Australia. Its local government area is the City of Greater Bendigo. At the 2021 census, Golden Square had a population of 9,220.

== History ==
Gold was discovered in the bed of the Bendigo Creek in the spring of 1851, about 200 metres from where the Golden Square Hotel now stands, sparking the gold rush that established the Australian city of Bendigo. Two women, Mrs Kennedy and Mrs Farrell, are commonly credited with having made the discovery. There is a monument along the Bendigo Creek Trail on the South Side of the Maple Street Bridge dedicated to the discovery of Bendigo gold at that location. The Post Office opened on 10 January 1863. The local swimming pool was built in 1918 originally called the Golden Square Baths, later renamed to Golden Square Swimming Pool. Trams ran from Charring Cross along High Street Golden Square to the Maple Street terminus.

== Today ==
Golden Square is home to The Bulldogs Football and Netball Team competing in the Bendigo Football League, Golden Square Secondary College (which has since been closed), Golden Square Primary School, (which is merger of Laurel street and Maple street campuses) and the Golden Square Shopping Centre.

The historic Golden Square Swimming Pool was originally proposed to be closed by the council in 2010, however it was saved and still runs today as a volunteer-run pool operated by the community itself with pool patronage increasing on a yearly basis.

The new Bendigo Police station is located on the edge of Golden Square and was opened in March 2007.

The Golden Square railway station on the Bendigo railway line opened with the line but was closed in 1981.

== Notable people ==
Golden Square Football Club has produced AFL stars such as Brownlow Medallist Greg Williams, Richmond stars Wayne Campbell and Nathan Brown, and former Fitzroy, Brisbane and Melbourne player Nick Carter.

Leading AFL player manager Ricky Nixon also started his playing career at Golden Square before playing VFL football with Carlton, St Kilda and Hawthorn.

Other former VFL players to hail from Golden Square include Des Dickson, Ray Byrne, Tony Southcombe and Peter McConville. The Golden Square Football Club has achieved 5 consecutive senior premierships in the Bendigo Football League (2009 to 2013), the first of its kind for the club.
