= Leichardt, Victoria =

Leichardt Bendigo, Victoria
- Coordinates: 36°42′17″S 144°06′53″E
- Population: 167 (2021 census)
- Postcode(s): 3516
- LGA(s): City of Greater Bendigo; Shire of Loddon
- State electorate(s): Bendigo West
- Federal division(s): Bendigo; Malle

Leichardt is a locality in the City of Greater Bendigo and the Shire of Loddon, Victoria, Australia. At the 2021 census, Leichardt had a population of 167.

== History ==
The locality is likely named after Ludwig Leichhardt. In 1874, a school was opened which then closed in 1993. Throughout most of Leichardt's history, it has been a farming settlement.
