= Kimbolton, Victoria =

Kimbolton
- Suburb
- Interactive map of Kimbolton
- Country: Australia
- State: Victoria
- City: Bendigo
- LGA: City of Greater Bendigo

Government
  - State electorate: Euroa
  - Federal division: Bendigo

Population
  - Total: 73 (2016 census)
- Postcode: 3551

Kimbolton is a locality in the City of Greater Bendigo, in the state of Victoria.
