= Bagshot, Victoria =

Bagshot
- Suburb
- Interactive map of Bagshot
- Coordinates: 36°40′6″S 144°24′4″E
- Country: Australia
- State: Victoria
- City: Bendigo
- LGA: City of Greater Bendigo

Government
  - State electorate: Bendigo East
  - Federal division: Bendigo

Population
  - Total: 355 (2021 census)
- Postcode: 3551

Bagshot is a locality in the City of Greater Bendigo, Victoria, Australia. At the 2021 census, Bagshot had a population of 355.

The locality has a public hall built in 1909. Bagshot is named after the town of Bagshot in Surrey, England.
