= Lockwood, Victoria =

Lockwood Bendigo, Victoria
- Coordinates: 36°48′9″S 144°9′35″E
- Population: 806 (2021 census)
  - Density: 19.906/km^{2} (51.56/sq mi)
- Postcode(s): 3551
- Area: 40.49 km^{2} (15.6 sq mi)
- LGA(s): City of Greater Bendigo

Lockwood is a town in the City of Greater Bendigo, Victoria, Australia. At the 2021 census, Lockwood had a population of 806.

Lockwood was the administrative centre of the Shire of Marong from 1864 to 1908.
