= Elmore, Victoria =

Elmore
- Suburb
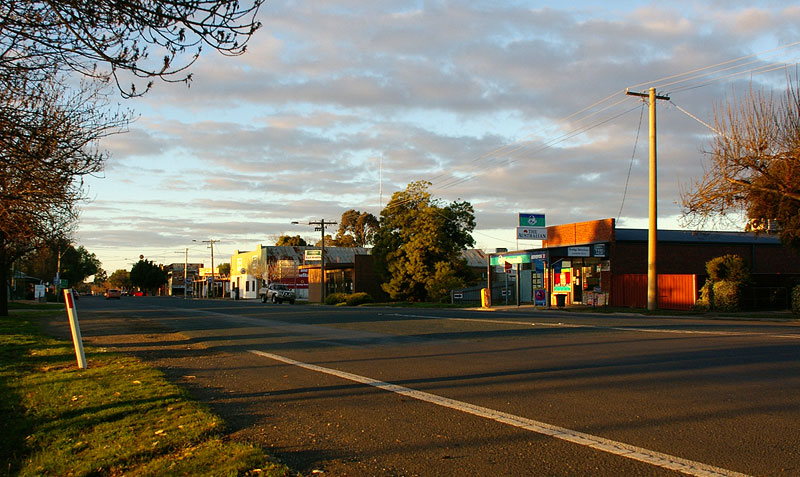
- Looking north along Railway Place, 2006

- Interactive map of Elmore
- Coordinates: 36°29′0″S 144°36′0″E
- Country: Australia
- State: Victoria
- City: Bendigo
- LGA: City of Greater Bendigo
- Location: 163 km (101 mi) N of Melbourne; 50 km (31 mi) NE of Bendigo; 50 km (31 mi) S of Echuca; 16 km (9.9 mi) from Rochester

Government
  - State electorate: Bendigo East
  - Federal division: Bendigo

Population
  - Total: 847 (2021 census)
- Postcode: 3558

Elmore is a town in Victoria, Australia, north-east of Bendigo on the Campaspe River. It is close to the Whipstick State Park.

At the 2021 census, Elmore had a population of 867 people.

== History ==
In the 1840s a small settlement developed on the Campaspe River servicing pastoral runs. The post office opened on 1 January 1849 as Bertram's Inn. On 1 January 1850 it was renamed Campaspie (sic). In 1864 when the township was established the name became Runnymede and in around 1882 the name was changed again to Elmore.

Due to local pressure, a Court of Petty Sessions opened at Elmore on 17 December 1965, despite its proximity to the then-existing court at Rochester. It closed on 1 January 1983 due to low usage; in 1981, it had sat for only 24 hours and heard 280 cases, mostly related to traffic offences.
