= Myers Flat, Victoria =

Myers Flat Bendigo, Victoria
- Coordinates: 36°41′S 144°12′E
- Population: 545 (2021 census)
- Postcode(s): 3551
- LGA(s): City of Greater Bendigo
- State electorate(s): Bendigo West
- Federal division(s): Bendigo

Myers Flat is a locality in the City of Greater Bendigo in the Australian state of Victoria. Myers Flat was named after Thomas Myers who was the co-proprietor of the Weddikar pastoral run.

== History ==
European settlement began in Myers Flat, then known as "Myers Creek", in 1845. Gold was first discovered in Myers Flat in 1852.

=== School and church ===
On 16 July 1860, John Starkey opened a building that served as Myers Flat's church and school. This was demolished and replaced in 1864 by St Augustine's Catholic Church. Built in the German Gothic style, the church was opened on 6 November 1864 by the Very Reverend Dean Hayes: a plaque commemorates the event. The new church served as a school until 1908, when St Liborious Primary School opened in Eaglehawk.
