= Electoral district of Bendigo East =

State electoral district of Victoria, Australia

Coordinates: 36°45′S 144°20′E

Bendigo East Victoria—Legislative Assembly
- Interactive map of electoral district boundaries from the 2022 state election
- State: Victoria
- Dates current: 1904–1927; 1985–present
- MP: Jacinta Allan
- Party: Labor Party
- Namesake: East Bendigo
- Electors: 53,134 (2022)
- Area: 2,711 km^{2} (1,046.7 sq mi)
- Demographic: Provincial and rural
Electorates around Bendigo East:
Murray Plains	Murray Plains	Murray Plains
Ripon	Bendigo East	Euroa
Bendigo West	Macedon	Euroa

Bendigo East is an electoral district of the Legislative Assembly in the Australian state of Victoria. It covers an area of 2,711 square kilometres (1,047 sq mi) covering the part of the city of Bendigo east of the Yungera railway line and surrounding rural areas to the north, east and south. It includes the Bendigo suburbs of East Bendigo, Epsom, Flora Hill, Junortoun, Kennington, Quarry Hill, Spring Gully, Strathdale, Strathfieldsaye and White Hills, and the surrounding towns of Axedale, Goornong, Huntly, Mandurang, Raywood and Sedgwick. It also includes parts of the localities of Eaglehawk, Elmore, Golden Square and Ravenswood, and the Bendigo campus of La Trobe University. It lies within the Northern Victoria Region of the upper house, the Legislative Council.

The electorate was first created in 1904 in what was then a relatively strong Labor area. It continuously returned Labor candidates from 1907 until its abolition in 1927, when it was merged with Bendigo West to create a single Bendigo electorate. It was recreated in 1985 as a marginal seat and was won by Liberal candidate Michael John, who went on to serve as a minister in the Kennett government. He was narrowly defeated by Labor candidate Jacinta Allan at the 1999 general election. Allan was re-elected at the 2002, 2006, 2010, 2014, 2018 and 2022 elections, and served as Premier from 2023 until 2026.

== Members for Bendigo East ==
First incarnation (1904–1927)
Member	Party	Term
Alfred Shrapnell Bailes	Unaligned	1904–1907
Thomas Glass	Labor	1907–1911
Alfred Hampson	Labor	1911–1915
Luke Clough	Labor	1915–1927
Second incarnation (1985–present)
Member	Party	Term
Michael John	Liberal	1985–1999
Jacinta Allan	Labor	1999–2026

== Election results ==
2022 Victorian state election: Bendigo East
Party	Candidate	Votes	%	±%
Labor	Jacinta Allan	22,010	48.3	−2.0
Liberal	Darin Schade	12,478	27.4	+6.5
Greens	Michael Tolhurst	3,944	8.7	+0.7
One Nation	Ben Mihail	2,597	5.7	+5.7
Ind. (Australia One)	James Laurie	1,603	3.5	+3.5
Animal Justice	Vyonne McLelland-Howe	1,574	3.5	+3.5
Family First	Evelyn Keetelaar	1,362	3.0	+3.0
Total formal votes		45,568	95.4	−0.2
Informal votes		2,184	4.6	+0.2
Turnout		47,752	89.9	−2.3
Two-party-preferred result
Labor	Jacinta Allan	27,727	60.8	−1.3
Liberal	Darin Schade	17,841	39.2	+1.3
Labor hold		Swing	−1.3	

Two-party-preferred vote results in Bendigo East (second incarnation) View source data.
