= O'Keefe Rail Trail =

Rail trail in Victoria, Australia

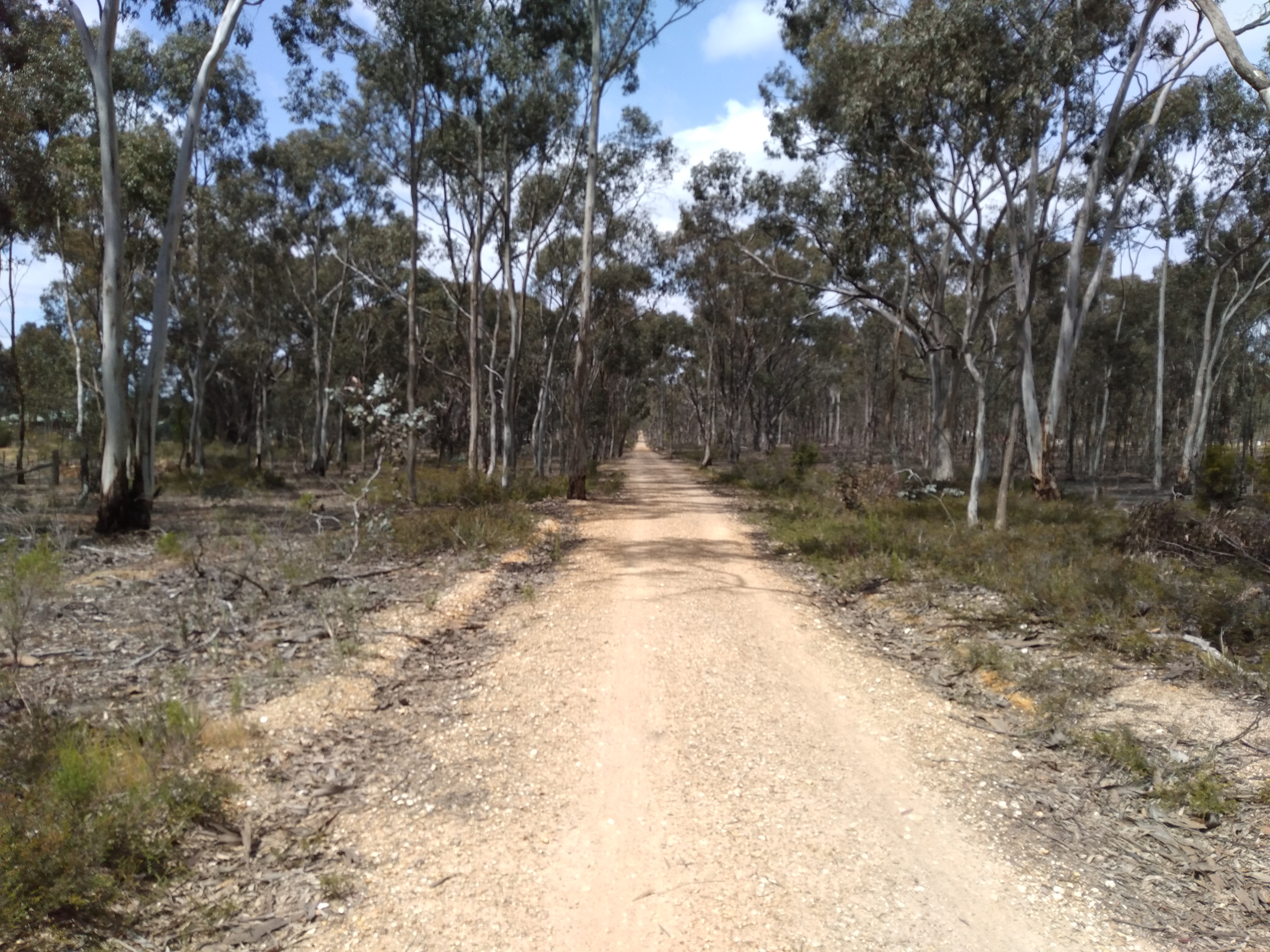
O'Keefe Rail Trail in Junortoun

The O'Keefe Rail Trail is a 50-kilometre (31 mi) rail trail connecting Bendigo with Heathcote. The sandy gravel trail runs along a former branch line on the Melbourne-Sydney rail line. It previously ran 17 km (11 mi) from Bendigo to Axedale but works completed in 2015 extended the route to Heathcote.

The trail includes a number of bridges, including the $50,000 Axe Creek Suspension Bridge, which was built in 1993. In early 2014, a pedestrian/cycle bridge was built over the Campaspe River at Axedale.

The trail also includes a tunnel that crosses under the McIvor Highway at Axedale. This was constructed as part of the Campaspe River crossing project in 2014.

The trail is named after Andrew O'Keefe, an early railway pioneer.

== History ==
The Heathcote to North Bendigo line was built by O'Keefe in 1888 after successfully tendering 88,409 pounds to build the 28 miles (45 km) of track and 50 bridges. It formed part of the Wandong to Bendigo line, and was commissioned as part of the Railway Construction Act 821, which authorised large amounts of railway infrastructure to be built. At the time, Heathcote had a population of 1500, and was part of the supply chain for the gold rush.

From 1888 for several decades, the railway was kept busy supplying timber for mine shafts, and as fuel. At its peak, two trainloads of timber was transported each day. However, by 1958, this had dwindled to less than a trainload of freight per week, and the service was suspended.

The track was finally dismantled in the 1970s.

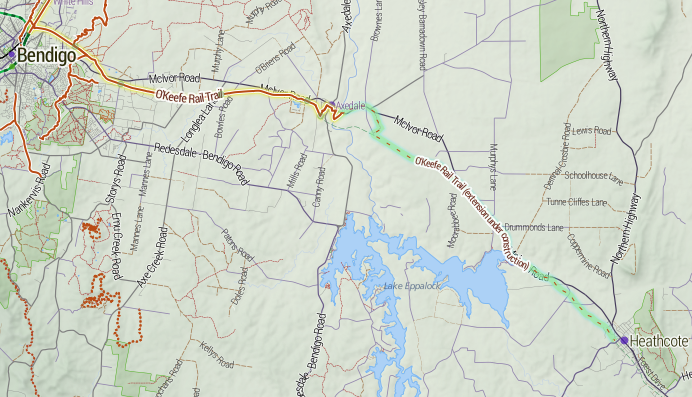
Map of the rail trail, as at September 2013.

== Sources ==
- O'Keefe Rail Trail – Updates
- O'Keefe Rail Trail
- "O'Keefe Rail Trail", City of Greater Bendigo, 2000.
- Friends of the Bendigo-Kilmore Rail Trail
