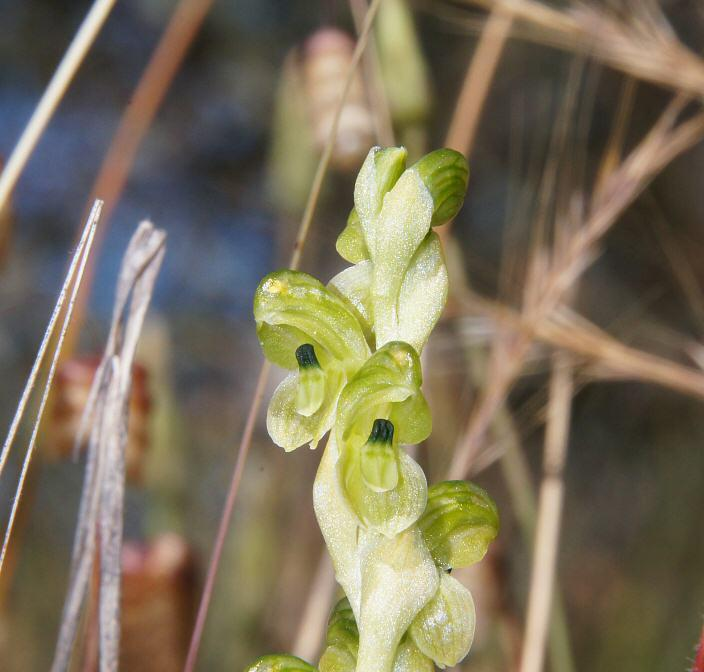
- Near Lake Eppalock

Scientific classification
- Kingdom: Plantae
- Clade: Tracheophytes
- Clade: Angiosperms
- Clade: Monocots
- Order: Asparagales
- Family: Orchidaceae
- Subfamily: Orchidoideae
- Tribe: Cranichideae
- Genus: Pterostylis
- Species: P. agrestis

Binomial name
- Pterostylis agrestis (D.L.Jones) G.N.Backh.

Synonyms
- Hymenochilus agrestis D.L.Jones; Pterostylis sp. aff. bicolor; Pterostylis sp. aff. bicolor (Woorndoo)

= Pterostylis agrestis =

Species of orchid

Pterostylis agrestis is a plant in the orchid family Orchidaceae and is endemic to Victoria. It has a rosette of leaves and when flowering, up to fourteen transparent green flowers with a blunt, greenish-black appendage on the labellum. It is similar to the black-tip greenhood, Pterostylis bicolor but that species has larger, less crowded flowers and is found in different habitats.

== Description ==
Pterostylis agrestis, is a terrestrial, perennial, deciduous, herb with an underground tuber. It has a rosette of between five and eight crowded, egg-shaped leaves, each leaf 6–20 mm (0.2–0.8 in) long and 3–8 mm (0.1–0.3 in) wide. When flowering there are between three and fourteen crowded, translucent green flowers with darker green lines. The flowers are 8–10 mm (0.3–0.4 in) long and borne on a flowering spike 50–120 mm (2–5 in) tall with four to six stem leaves. The dorsal sepal and petals form a hood over the column. The lateral sepals turn downwards, 4–6 mm (0.16–0.24 in) long and 6–7 mm (0.2–0.3 in) wide, dished and joined for most of their length. The labellum is egg-shaped, about 2 mm (0.08 in) long and wide and green with a greenish-black, forward pointing appendage with three ridges. Flowering occurs from September to October.

== Taxonomy and naming ==
This orchid was first formally described in 2009 by David Jones who gave it the name Hymenochilus agrestis from a specimen collected near Sutton Grange. The description was published in The Orchadian. In 2010, Gary Backhouse changed the name to Pterostylis agrestis. The specific epithet (agrestis) is a Latin word meaning "land", "rural" or "wild ".

== Distribution and habitat ==
This greenhood is poorly known but has been recorded in grassland near Bacchus Marsh, Maldon, Sutton Grange and Taradale in central Victoria. Pterostylis bicolor is similar but generally found in woodland or coastal scrub.
