= Midland Highway (Victoria) =

Highway in Victoria

Midland Highway Victoria
- Coordinates: 38.133427°S 144.351043°E (Southwest end); 37.052121°S 146.088071°E (Northeast end)

General information
- Type: Highway
- Length: 450 km (280 mi)
- Gazetted: December 1913 (as Main Road); 1933 (as State Highway)
- Route number(s): A300 (1998–present) (Geelong–Benalla); B300 (1998–present) (Benalla–Barjarg); C518 (1998–present) (Barjarg–Mansfield)
- Former route number: State Route 149 (1986–1998) (Geelong–Benalla); State Route 153 (1986–1998) (Benalla–Barjang); State Route 153 (1986–1998) (Midland Link Highway: Barjarg-Maindample); Alternative State Route 153 (1986–1998) (Barjarg–Mansfield); State Route 190 (1986–1998) (Morwell–Port Welshpool)

Major junctions
- Southwest end: Princes Highway; Geelong, Victoria
- Geelong Ring Road; Glenelg Highway; Western Freeway; Pyrenees Highway; Calder Freeway; Calder Highway; McIvor Highway; Northern Highway; Goulburn Valley Highway; Hume Freeway
- Northeast end: Maroondah Highway; Mansfield, Victoria

Location(s)
- Region: Barwon South West, Grampians, Loddon Mallee, Hume
- Major settlements: Ballarat, Daylesford, Castlemaine, Bendigo, Elmore, Shepparton, Benalla

Highway system
- Highways in Australia; National Highway • Freeways in Australia; Highways in Victoria

The Midland Highway is a major rural highway linking major towns in Victoria, beginning from Geelong and winding through country Victoria in a large arc through the cities of Ballarat, Bendigo and Shepparton, eventually reaching Mansfield at the foothills of the Victorian Alps.

Midland Link Highway links Barjarg (on Midland Highway) and Maindample (on Maroondah Highway), bypassing Mansfield and reducing the journey from Benalla to Alexandra by 19 kilometres (12 mi).

== Route ==
Midland Highway commences at the intersection of Melbourne Road at Geelong, and heads in a north-westerly direction as a four lane, dual-carriageway road through the western suburbs of Geelong until it reaches the interchange with Geelong Ring Road, where it narrows to a two-lane, single carriageway rural highway, continues north-east through Meredith and turning north to the southern suburbs of Ballarat, where it widens again to a four-lane, dual-carriageway road through central Ballarat, until a short distance south of the interchange with Western Freeway where the road narrows again to a two-lane, single carriageway. It continues in a north-eastly direction through Daylesford and Castlemaine, where it meets Calder Freeway just outside Harcourt and runs concurrent with it as a four-lane, dual-carriageway road until it reaches central Bendigo, when it narrows to a four-lane, single carriageway road and splits off to run north-east through Bendigo's suburbs of Epsom and Huntly, where it narrows back to a two-lane rural highway. It meets Northern Highway at Elmore, and continues in an easterly direction where it meets Goulburn Valley Highway in central Shepparton, before heading in a south-easterly direction to Benalla. It meets Hume Freeway at an interchange just south of the town, before continuing in a southerly direction. Midland Link Highway splits off at Barjang, where the highway continues in a south-easterly direction to eventually terminate at a roundabout in the town centre with Maroondah Highway in Mansfield.

== History ==
The passing of the Country Roads Act 1912 through the Parliament of Victoria provided for the establishment of the Country Roads Board (later VicRoads) and their ability to declare Main Roads, taking responsibility for the management, construction and care of the state's major roads from local municipalities. Boolarra-Welshpool Road from Boolarra via Wonyip to Welshpool, and Jeeralang West Road from Morwell to Hazelwood (and continuing south via Jeeralang and Grand Ridge to Wonyip), were declared Main Roads on 1 December 1913; Geelong-Ballarat Road was declared a Main Road from Geelong to Lethbridge on 16 March 1914, and from Lethbridge through Meredith to Ballarat on 21 June 1915; Shepparton-(Mooroopna-)Tatura Road between Shepparton through Mooroopna to Tatura and Shepparton-(Nalinga-)Benalla Road between Shepparton through Nalinga to Benalla were declared Main Roads on 17 March 1915; Castlemaine-(Creswick-)Ballarat Road between Ballarat and Creswick (and continuing north to Newstead), and Daylesford-Ballarat Road between Daylesford and Newlyn] (and continuing south to Ballarat East, were declared Main Roads on 20 September 1915; Castlemaine-Daylesford Road was declared a Main Road, between Castlemaine and Guildford on 28 June 1915, and between Guildford and Daylesford on 20 September 1915; and Benalla-Mansfield Road between Benalla and Barjang was declared a Main Road on 28 June 1915.

The passing of the Highways and Vehicles Act 1924 provided for the declaration of State Highways, roads two-thirds financed by the state government through the Country Roads Board. Midland Highway was declared a State Highway in 1933, cobbled together from roads between Geelong and Ballarat, between Shepparton and Benalla, and between Benalla to the turn-off-road to Maindample in Barjang (for a total of 114 miles), subsuming the original declarations of Geelong-Ballarat Road, Shepparton-Benalla Road and Benalla-Mansfield Road as Main Roads. In the 1947/48 financial year, another section from Shepparton via Stanhope to Elmore was added, subsuming the original declaration of Shepparton-Tatura Road and also along the former Shepparton–Elmore Road; with the realignment of Northern Highway south of Elmore running to Kilmore instead of to Bendigo declared at the same time, the previous alignment of Northern Highway between Elmore and Bendigo was also added to Midland Highway. In the 1959/60 financial year, the last section from Ballarat via Creswick and Daylesford to Castlemaine was added, subsuming the original declaration of Castlemaine-Daylesford Road, Castlemaine-Creswick-Ballarat Road (between Creswick and Ballarat) and Daylesford-Ballarat (between Daylesford and Newlyn) as Main Roads, and along the former Creswick–Daylesford Road. With the deviation of Calder Highway past Castlemaine declared at the same time, the previous alignment of Calder Highway between Castlemaine and Harcourt was also added to Midland Highway. With the highway running concurrent with Calder Highway between Harcourt and Bendigo, Midland Highway had finally achieved its present-day alignment at this stage. Midland Link Highway was later declared on 9 May 1983 along the former Maindample–Benalla Road, to act as a western bypass of Mansfield.

Midland Highway also had a separate, southern section through South Gippsland, declared in 1939, from Morwell through Boolarra to Welshpool (with the intention to be linked up in the future with the existing highway at Mansfield), subsuming the original declarations of Boolarra-Welshpool Road and Jeeralang West Road (between Morwell and Hazelwood) as Main Roads; it appears to have been extended to Port Welshpool by 1972, and a 9.6 km portion of highway through Yinnar was declared Midland Freeway in 1975, despite being only a single-carriageway road. The highway was re-routed with a 20 km deviation from south of Yinnar via Churchill to Princes Highway in eastern Morwell in 1976; the former alignment is now known as Yinnar Road and Brodribb Road (the latter signed route C468 in 1998). This section, eventually 88 km long, was eventually stripped of both freeway and State Highway status: from south of Grand Ridge Road to Port Welshpool in August 1990, and from north of Grand Ridge Road to Morwell in September 1990 – replaced as a north–south route through South Gippsland by the recently declared Strzelecki and Hyland Highways – and renamed into its current constituent parts (Monash Way, Budgeree Road, Woorarra Road and Port Welshpool Road), with the section between Wonyip and Albert River Road incorporated back into the Grand Ridge Road.

The alignment of the highway through southern Ballarat was altered in May 1990: previously running north through Buninyong along Warrenheip Street, Geelong Road, Main Road and along Western Highway to meet its northern half at Doveton Street North, it was re-aligned to its current route running west through Buninyong along Buninyong-Sebastopol Road via Sebastopol and then along Skipton Street and Doveton Street South (the former alignment of Glenelg Highway, truncated back to Sebastopol at the same time) to meet its northern half directly at Sturt Street; the former alignment is now known as Ballarat-Buninyong Road (signed route C294 in 1998).

Midland Highway was signed as State Route 149 between Geelong and Benalla, State Route 153 between Benalla and Barjang, Alternative State Route 153 between Barjang and Mansfield, and State Route 190 between Morwell and Port Welshpool in 1986; with Victoria's conversion to the newer alphanumeric system in the late 1990s, this was replaced by route A300 between Geelong and Benalla, route B300 between Benalla and Barjang, and route C518 between Barjang and Mansfield; despite highway status being removed between Morwell and Port Welshpool, the former highway alignment continued to be signed as State Route 190 until the change-over to the new alphanumeric system, when all traces of the former route were removed. Midland Link Highway was signed State Route 153 between Barjang and Maindample in 1986, and was later replaced by route B300.

The passing of the Road Management Act 2004 granted the responsibility of overall management and development of Victoria's major arterial roads to VicRoads: in 2004, VicRoads re-declared Midland Link Highway (Arterial #6030) from Midland Highway in Barjang to Maroondah Highway in Maindample, and in 2004 re-declared Midland Highway (Arterial #6590) to begin at Corio-Waurn Ponds Road (Old Princes Highway) in Geelong and end at Maroondah Highway in Mansfield.

== Major intersections and towns ==
LGA	Location	km	mi	Destinations	Notes
Greater Geelong	Geelong–Geelong West boundary	0.0	0.0	Melbourne Road (A10/Tourist Drive 21 north) – Corio, Melbourne, Avalon Airport; Kerra Street (A10/Tourist Drive 21 south) – City Centre, Colac	Southwestern terminus of highway and route A300
Greater Geelong	Geelong West–Geelong North boundary	0.3	0.19	Geelong railway line	
Greater Geelong	Geelong North–Hamlyn Heights boundary	1.5	0.93	Shannon Avenue (C136 south) – Belmont, Ceres; Thompsons Road (C136 north) – Norlane	Southbound left turn via Lily Avenue
Greater Geelong	Hamlyn Heights–Bell Park–Bell Post Hill tripoint	3.0	1.9	Anakie Road (C118) – Corio, Fyansford	
Greater Geelong	Bell Post Hill–Batesford boundary	4.5	2.8	Geelong Ring Road (M1) – Melbourne, Colac, Avalon Airport	
Greater Geelong	Batesford	6.1	3.8	Geelong–Ballan Road (C141) – Anakie, Ballan, Daylesford	
Moorabool River		8.7	5.4	Batesford Bridge	
Golden Plains	Gheringhap	12.2	7.6	Fyansford–Gheringhap Road (C111) – Ceres, Mount Moriac	
Golden Plains	Gheringhap	13.1	8.1	Western SG and Geelong–Ballarat railway lines	
Golden Plains	Bannockburn	17.1	10.6	Shelford–Bannockburn Road (C143) – Shelford	
Golden Plains	Meredith	43.1	26.8	Meredith–Steiglitz Road – Steiglitz	
Moorabool	Elaine	52.8	32.8	Geelong–Ballarat railway line	
Ballarat	Buninyong	73.2	45.5	Ballarat–Buninyong Road – Mount Clear, Ballarat East	
Ballarat	Magpie–Sebastopol	79.0	49.1	Colac–Ballarat Road – Rokewood, Cressy, Colac	
Ballarat	Sebastopol	83.2	51.7	Glenelg Highway (B160 west) – Skipton, Hamilton, Mount Gambier; Sayle Street (east) Sebastopol	
Ballarat	Redan	84.4	52.4	Drummond Street South – Ballarat, Lake Wendouree	No right turn from Midland Highway southbound
Ballarat	Redan	84.7	52.6	Ballarat–Carngham Road – Newington, Carngham	
Ballarat	Ballarat	86.3	53.6	Sturt Street – Alfredton, Burrumbeet	
Ballarat	Ballarat	86.5	53.7	Mair Street (C805) – Ballarat East, Warrenheip	
Ballarat	Ballarat	87.7	54.5	Macarthur Street, to Drummond Street North (C305) – Ballarat, Redan	
Ballarat	Ballarat	88.2	54.8	Ararat railway line	
Ballarat	Wendouree	88.5	55.0	Howitt Street (C287 west, no shield east) – Clunes, Talbot, Maryborough	
Ballarat	Wendouree–Mount Rowan boundary	91.1	56.6	Western Freeway (M8) – Melbourne, Horsham, Bordertown, Adelaide	
Ballarat–Hepburn boundary	Sulky	97.1	60.3	Mildura railway line	
Hepburn	Creswick	103.6	64.4	Bungaree–Creswick Road (C291 south) – Bungaree, Wallace	Concurrency with route C291
Hepburn	Creswick	104.5	64.9	Clunes–Creswick Road (C291 north) – Clunes	Concurrency with route C291
Hepburn	Newlyn	113.0	70.2	Daylesford–Ballarat Road (C292 south) – Clarkes Hill, Ballarat East; Dean-Newlyn Road (east) – Dean	
Hepburn	Daylesford	131.1	81.5	Hepburn Springs Road (C138 north) – Hepburn Springs; Hepburn Springs Road (C141 south) – Ballan, Anakie, Geelong	
Hepburn	Daylesford	132.3	82.2	Daylesford–Trentham Road (C317) – Trentham, Woodend	
Hepburn	Daylesford	133.4	82.9	Daylesford–Malmsbury Road (C316) – Denver, Malmsbury	
Hepburn	Dry Diggings	139.5	86.7	Back Hepburn Road – Hepburn Springs	
Hepburn	Mount Franklin	143.7	89.3	Daylesford–Newstead Road – Newstead, Maldon	
Mount Alexander	Guildford	157.7	98.0	Moolort railway line	
Mount Alexander	Castlemaine	165.2	102.7	Victorian Goldfields Railway	
Mount Alexander	Castlemaine	165.3	102.7	Pyrenees Highway (B180 west) – Newstead, Maryborough, Ararat	Southern terminus of concurrency with route B180
Mount Alexander	Castlemaine	167.2	103.9	Bendigo railway line	
Mount Alexander	Castlemaine	167.5	104.1	Forest Street (B180 east, no route west) – Elphinstone	Northern terminus of concurrency with route B180
Mount Alexander	Castlemaine	169.8	105.5	Bendigo railway line	
Mount Alexander	Barkers Creek–Harcourt boundary	175.3	108.9	Calder Highway (M79 south) – Melbourne; Victoria Road (east) – Harcourt	Southern terminus of concurrency with route M79
Greater Bendigo	Ravenswood South–Harcourt North boundary	181.0	112.5	Fogartys Gap Road (west) – Maldon; Harmony Way (east) – Harcourt, Elphinstone	At-grade intersection
Greater Bendigo	Ravenswood	189.3	117.6	Calder Alternative Highway (A790) – Marong, Mildura	Northern terminus of concurrency with route M79; Southern terminus of concurrency with route A79
Greater Bendigo	Kangaroo Flat	199.8	124.1	Bendigo–Maryborough Road (C277) – Maryborough	
Greater Bendigo	Golden Square	201.8	125.4	Oak Street (C323 north/C353 south) – Long Gully, Eaglehawk, Quarry Hill, Strathdale	
Greater Bendigo	Bendigo	204.4	127.0	Don Street (A79 north) – Marong; Myrtle Street (C331 south) – Quarry Hill, Flora Hill	Northern terminus of concurrency with route A79
Greater Bendigo	Bendigo	205.9	127.9	Chapel Street (B280 south/C329 north) – California Gully, Axedale, Heathcote	
Greater Bendigo	Bendigo	207.3	128.8	Mildura railway line	
Greater Bendigo	White Hills	209.2	130.0	Lyons Street (C333 west, no route east) – Long Gully	
Greater Bendigo	White Hills	209.9	130.4	Hamelin Street (C343 east, no route west) – Strathdale, Bendigo Airport	
Greater Bendigo	Huntly	219.8	136.6	Bendigo–Tennyson Road (C338) – Drummartin, Mitiamo	
Greater Bendigo	Bagshot	224.4	139.4	Echuca railway line	
Greater Bendigo	Goornong	239.5	148.8	Bendigo–Murchison Road (C345) – Murchison, Violet Town	
Greater Bendigo	Elmore	251.1	156.0	Northern Highway (B75 north) – Rochester, Echuca	Western terminus of concurrency with route B75
Campaspe River		251.5	156.3	Elmore Bridge	
Campaspe	Burnewang–Runnymede boundary	252.7	157.0	Northern Highway (B75 south) – Heathcote, Kilmore, Wallan	Eastern terminus of concurrency with route B75
Campaspe	Corop	269.0	167.1	Heathcote–Rochester Road (C347 north) – Rochester	Concurrency with route C347
Campaspe	Corop	269.9	167.7	Heathcote–Rochester Road (C347 south) – Heathcote	Concurrency with route C347
Campaspe	Stanhope	288.3	179.1	Girgarre–Rushworth Road (C348) – Girgarre, Rushworth	
Greater Shepparton	Byrneside	305.8	190.0	Kyabram–Byrneside Road (C354) – Lancaster	
Greater Shepparton	Byrneside	307.4	191.0	Toolamba-Echuca railway line	
Greater Shepparton	Tatura	310.2	192.7	Tatura–Undera Road (C357) – Undera, Tatura	
Greater Shepparton	Mooroopna	322.3	200.3	Echuca–Mooroopna Road (C355 north) – Wyuna; Mooroopna–Murchison Road (C369 south) – Murchison	
Goulburn River		325.1	202.0	Daintons Bridge	
Greater Shepparton	Shepparton	325.7	202.4	Goulburn Valley Highway (A39) – Tocumwal, Nagambie, Seymour	
Greater Shepparton	Shepparton	326.4	202.8	Goulburn Valley railway line	
Greater Shepparton	Shepparton	328.7	204.2	Doyles Road (C391) – Congupna, Kialla	
Greater Shepparton	Nalinga	354.8	220.5	Dookie–Nalinga Road (C365 north) – Dookie	Concurrency with route C365
Greater Shepparton	Nalinga	356.4	221.5	Dookie–Violet Town Road (C365 south) – Violet Town	Concurrency with route C365
Benalla	Benalla	376.4	233.9	Benalla–Tocumwal Road (C371) – Katamatite, Tocumwal	
Benalla	Benalla	385.8	239.7	North East railway line	
Benalla	Benalla	386.5	240.2	Bridge Street East (C313) – Winton	
Benalla	Benalla	391.6	243.3	Hume Freeway (M31) – Melbourne, Wangaratta, Albury, Sydney	Southern terminus of route A300; Northern terminus of route B300
Mansfield	Barjang	434.6	270.0	Midland Link Highway (B300 southwest) – Maindample, Yarck	Route B300 continues southwest along Midland Link Highway; Northern terminus of route C518
Mansfield	Mansfield	449.5	279.3	High Street (B320 west) – Maindample, Yarck; High Street (Mount Buller Road) (C320 east) – Mount Buller	Southern terminus of highway and route C518
1.000 mi = 1.609 km; 1.000 km = 0.621 mi: Concurrency terminus; Incomplete access; Route transition

== See also ==
- Highways in Australia
- List of highways in Victoria
