= List of acts of the Parliament of Victoria from 1887 =

This is a list of acts of the Parliament of Victoria, Australia for the year 1887.

== 1887 ==
Short title, or popular name	Citation	Royal assent
Long title
	51 Vict. No. 916	18 July 1887
An Act to authorize Municipalities to expend Money in celebrating the Queen's Jubilee. (Repealed by Local Government Act 1890 (54 Vict. No. 1112))
	51 Vict. No. 917	27 July 1887
An Act to apply out of the Consolidated Revenue the sum of One Million eight hundred and eighty-three thousand seven hundred and twenty pounds to the service of the year One thousand eight hundred and eighty seven and eight.
Duties of Customs Act 1887 (repealed)	51 Vict. No. 918	5 September 1887
An Act for granting to Her Majesty certain Duties of Customs in lieu of certain other Duties. (Repealed by Customs and Excise Duties Act 1890 (54 Vict. No. 1082))
Municipal Tramways (Delegation of Powers) Act 1887 (repealed)	51 Vict. No. 919	8 September 1887
An Act to amend "The Local Government Amending Act 1884." (Note: Local Government Amending Act 1884 (48 Vict. No. 831)) (Repealed by Tramways Act 1890 (54 Vict. No. 1148))
Centennial Exhibition Act 1887 (repealed)	51 Vict. No. 920	12 September 1887
An Act to make better provision for the holding of a Public International Exhibition in Melbourne in the year One thousand eight hundred and eighty-eight and for other purposes. (Repealed by Exhibitions Act 1890 (54 Vict. No. 1089))
Gaols Act 1887 (repealed)	51 Vict. No. 921	3 October 1887
An Act to further amend the Law relating to Gaols and to persons confined therein. (Repealed by Gaols Act 1890 (54 Vict. No. 1096))
	51 Vict. No. 922	5 October 1887
An Act to provide for a Grant to the Honorable Peter Lalor. (Note: Peter Lalor, awarded a grant of £4000 on his retirement as Speaker of the Legislative Council.)
	51 Vict. No. 923	24 October 1887
An Act to amend "The Juries Statute 1876." (Note: Juries Statute 1876 (40 Vict. No. 560))
Mining Rents Act 1887 (repealed)	51 Vict. No. 924	28 October 1887
An Act to reduce the Rent payable to the Crown on small areas held under "The Mining on Private Property Act 1884." (Note: Mining on Private Property Act 1884 (48 Vict. No. 861)) (Repealed by Mines Act 1890 (54 Vict. No. 1120))
	51 Vict. No. 925	28 October 1887
An Act to repeal an Act intituled "An Act to provide for the Registration of Imported Stock." (Note: 19 Vict. No. 21)
Regulation of Mines and Mining Machinery Act 1887 (repealed)	51 Vict. No. 926	28 October 188
An Act to enable persons charged with offences against "The Regulation of Mines and Mining Machinery Act 1883" (Note: Regulation of Mines and Mining Machinery Act 1883 (47 Vict. No. 783)) and Act (Note: Regulation of Mines and Mining Machinery Act 1886 (50 Vict. No. 883)) amending the same to give evidence on their own behalf. (Repealed by Mines Act 1890 (54 Vict. No. 1120))
	51 Vict. No. 927	28 October 1887
An Act to apply out of the Consolidated Revenue the sum of One million four hundred and twenty-two thousand five hundred pounds to the service of the year One thousand eight hundred and eight seven and eight.
Probate Act 1887 (repealed)	51 Vict. No. 928	8 November 1887
An Act to give effect in Victoria to Probates and Letters of Administration granted in the United Kingdom or any of the other Australasian Colonies. (Repealed by Administration and Probate Act 1890 (54 Vict. No. 1160))
Australasian Naval Force Act 1887 (repealed)	51 Vict. No. 929	25 November 1887
An Act to provide for the payment by the Colony of Victoria of a Proportional Part of the Cost of the Establishment and Maintenance of an Additional Naval Force to be employed for the Protection of the Floating Trade in Australasian Waters. (Repealed by Defences and Discipline Act 1890 (54 Vict. No. 1083))
Ballarat Waterworks Act 1887 (repealed)	51 Vict. No. 930	28 November 1887
An Act to further amend "The Waterworks Act 1880" (Note: Waterworks Act 1880 (44 Vict. No. 656)) and for other purposes. (Repealed by Water Act 1890 (54 Vict. No. 1156))
Victorian Wesleyan Methodists' Act 1887	51 Vict. No. 931	16 December 1887
An Act to adapt and assimilate the Trusts of Wesleyan Church properties to the present Constitution of such Church in Victoria and for other collateral purposes.
	51 Vict. No. 932	16 December 1887
An Act to authorize the Sale of Liquors at the Centennial International Exhibition Melbourne 1888. (Repealed by Exhibitions Act 1890 (54 Vict. No. 1089))
Resumption of Lands for Public Purposes Act 1887 (repealed)	51 Vict. No. 933	16 December 1887
An Act to make provision for the Resumption of Lands for Public Purposes. (Repealed by Land Act 1890 (54 Vict. No. 1106))
Expiring Laws Continuance Act 1887	51 Vict. No. 934	16 December 1887
An Act to continue various Expiring Laws.
	51 Vict. No. 935	16 December 1887
An Act to vest a certain piece of Land situate at Elsternwick in the Borough of Brighton in the Minister of Public Instruction. (Repealed by Statute Law Revision Act 1984 (No. 10087))
	51 Vict. No. 936	16 December 1887
An Act to authorize the expenditure of certain sums of money for the purchase of Permanent-way Materials for Lines of Railway authorized to be constructed by "The Railway Construction Act 1884" (Note: Railway Construction Act 1884 (48 Vict. No. 821)) and for other purposes.
	51 Vict. No. 937	16 December 1887
An Act to enable the Mayor Councillors and Citizens of the City of Ballaarat to demise for terms of years certain Lands vested in them and for other purposes.
National Trustees Executors and Agency Company of Australasia Limited Act 1887	51 Vict. No. 938	16 December 1887
An Act to confer powers upon the National Trustees Executors and Agency Company of Australasia Limited.
Coroners' Juries' Act 1887 (repealed)	51 Vict. No. 939	16 December 1887
An Act to amend the Law with regard to Coroners' Juries. (Repealed by Coroners Act 1890 (54 Vict. No. 1077)
Juries' Act 1887	51 Vict. No. 940	17 December 1887
An Act to consolidate the Law relating to Juries.
Neglected Children's Act 1887 (repealed)	51 Vict. No. 941	17 December 1887
An Act to amend the Law relating to Neglected Children. (Repealed by Neglected Children's Act 1890 (54 Vict. No. 1121))
County Court (Extension of Jurisdiction) Act 1887 (repealed)	51 Vict. No. 942	17 December 1887
An Act to amend the "County Court Statute 1869." (Note: County Court Statute 1869 (33 Vict. No. 345)) (Repealed by County Court Act 1890 (54 Vict. No. 1078))
Colonial Permanent Trustee Executor and Agency Company Limited Act 1887	51 Vict. No. 943	17 December 1887
An Act to confer powers upon the Colonial Permanent Trustee Executor and Agency Company Limited.
Melbourne Hydraulic Power Company's Act 1887	51 Vict. No. 944	17 December 1887
An Act to facilitate the Supply of Motive Power on the High-pressure Hydraulic System for the Extinguishing of Fires and other purposes in Melbourne and its vicinity.
	51 Vict. No. 945	17 December 1887
An Act to alter and amend the "Transfer of Land Statute" (Note: Transfer of Land Statute 1866 (29 Vict. No. 301)) and for other purposes.
Water Conservation Act 1887 (repealed)	51 Vict. No. 946	17 December 1887
An Act to consolidate "The Victorian Water Conservation Acts 1881-1886" and for other purposes. (Repealed by Water Act 1890 (54 Vict. No. 1156))
Water Supply Loans Act 1887	51 Vict. No. 947	17 December 1887
An Act to sanction the issue and application of certain sums of money as Loans for Water Supply in the Country Districts and for other purposes.
Hastie Bequest Act 1887	51 Vict. No. 948	17 December 1887
An Act to authorize the trustees of the will of the late John Hastie Esquire to distribute the estate of the said John Hastie in accordance with an agreement between the next of kin of the testator and the several parties entitled under the will.
Licensing Amendment Act 1887	51 Vict. No. 949	17 December 1887
An Act to amend "The Licensing Act 1885." (Note: Licensing Act 1885 (49 Vict. No. 857))
Swivel Gun Act 1887 (repealed)	51 Vict. No. 950	17 December 1887
An Act to further amend an Act intituled "An Act to Protect Game." (Note: 31 Vict. No. 311) (Repealed by Game Act 1890 (54 Vict. No. 1095))
Juvenile Offenders Act 1887 (repealed)	51 Vict. No. 951	17 December 1887
An Act to amend the Law relating to Juvenile Offenders and for other purposes. (Repealed by Crimes Act 1890 (54 Vict. No. 1079))
Melbourne Tramways Trust Amendment and Extension Act 1887	51 Vict. No. 952	17 December 1887
An Act to alter and extend the Powers of the Melbourne Tramways Trust and for other purposes.
Justices of the Peace Act 1887	51 Vict. No. 953	17 December 1887
An Act to consolidate and amend the Law relating to Justices of the Peace and Courts of General and Petty Sessions.
	51 Vict. No. 954	17 December 1887
An Act to further amend "The Melbourne Harbor Trust Act 1876." (Note: Melbourne Harbor Trust Act 1876 (40 Vict. No. 552)) (Repealed by Melbourne Harbor Trust Act 1890 (54 Vict. No. 1119))
Temperance Halls Act 1887 (repealed)	51 Vict. No. 955	17 December 1887
An Act to enable Trustees of Temperance Halls to demise certain lands for terms of years and to raise Loans on the Rents of such lands and buildings and for other purposes. (Repealed by Temperance Halls Act 1890 (54 Vict. No. 1143))
Veterinary Surgeons Act 1887 (repealed)	51 Vict. No. 956	17 December 1887
An Act to establish a Veterinary Board and to regulate Veterinary Practice in Victoria. (Repealed by Veterinary Surgeons Act 1890 (54 Vict. No. 1154))
Slander Act 1887 (repealed)	51 Vict. No. 957	17 December 1887
An Act to amend the Law of Slander. (Repealed by Wrongs Act 1890 (54 Vict. No. 1160))
	51 Vict. No. 958	17 December 1887
An Act to apply a sum out of the Consolidated Revenue to the service of the year ending on the thirtieth day of June One thousand eight hundred and eighty-eight and to appropriate the Supplies granted in this Session of Parliament.
Intercolonial Debts Act 1887 (repealed)	51 Vict. No. 959	17 December 1887
An Act to facilitate the Recovery of Judgments against Debtors who have removed into adjacent colonies and the enforcement of Judgments obtained in adjacent colonies against Debtors who have removed from such colonies into Victoria. (Repealed by County Court Act 1890 (54 Vict. No. 1078))
Dentists Act 1887	51 Vict. No. 960	17 December 1887
An Act to provide for the Registration of Dentists qualified to practise in Victoria.
Factories and Shops Amendment Act 1887 (repealed)	51 Vict. No. 961	17 December 1887
An Act to amend "The Factories and Shops Act 1885." (Note: Factories and Shops Act 1885 (49 Vict. No. 862)) (Repealed by Factories and Shops Act 1890 (54 Vict. No. 1091))
Railway Loan Act 1887	51 Vict. No. 962	17 December 1887
An Act to apply out of "The Railway Loan Account 1885" or temporarily out of "The Public Account" certain sums of money for Railway Works and other purposes.
Railway Debentures Redemption Act 1887	51 Vict. No. 963	17 December 1887
An Act to provide for the Redemption and Payment of certain Debentures by increasing the amount of Victorian Government Stock.

== Sources ==
- "1887 Victorian Historical Acts". AustLII.
