= Andrew O'Keefe (engineer) =

Australian engineer

Andrew O'Keefe (died 1904) was a construction engineer in Gippsland, in southeastern Australia. He built several railways and a weir. The O'Keefe Rail Trail is named after him.

O'Keefe's parents immigrated from Ireland in 1854 due to famine, bringing him and his sister Mary. He worked on several construction projects, before tendering for and building the 28-mile Heathcote to Sandhurst railway line, which was completed in July 1888. The line was part of the Wandong to Bendigo line, and arose as part of Railway Construction Act No 821, since dubbed the "Octopus Act". It ran until 1958, when lack of passenger or freight demand saw it taken out of service.

O'Keefe's other projects included:

- the Eaglehawk to Bendigo tram line
- Laanecoorie Weir
- 1889 South Gippsland railway line between Korumburra to Toora

He died in 1904, leaving ten children.

== Sources ==
- O'Keefe Rail Trail, City of Greater Bendigo, 2000.
