= Northern Highway (Victoria) =

Highway in Victoria, Australia

Northern Highway Victoria
- Coordinates: 36.119341°S 144.739117°E (North end); 37.447966°S 144.980286°E (South end)

General information
- Type: Highway
- Length: 164.8 km (102 mi)
- Gazetted: November 1914 (as Main Road); July 1925 (as State Highway)
- Route number(s): B75 (1997–present)
- Former route number: National Route 75 (1955–1997) Entire route; National Highway 31 (1974–1976); National Route 31 (1954–1974) (Kilmore–Beveridge)

Major junctions
- North end: Cobb Highway; VIC/NSW border
- Murray Valley Highway; Midland Highway; McIvor Highway
- South end: Hume Freeway; Beveridge, Victoria

Location(s)
- Region: Loddon Mallee, Hume
- Major settlements: Rochester, Elmore, Heathcote, Kilmore, Wallan

Highway system
- Highways in Australia; National Highway • Freeways in Australia; Highways in Victoria

Northern Highway is a rural highway in northern Victoria, linking Echuca on the banks of the Murray River with Beveridge a short distance north of the northern suburban fringes of Melbourne. In conjunction with McIvor Highway, it provides an important link between Melbourne and Bendigo. It forms a significant freight route providing access to markets and ports in Melbourne and the rural primary production areas of the Murray Valley and southern New South Wales, and serves a number of agricultural and tourism-related industries along its length.

== Route ==
Northern Highway commences at the state border with New South Wales as a continuation of Cobb Highway into Victoria and heads in a southerly direction as a two-lane, single carriageway rural highway through the western part of the regional town of Echuca, running concurrent with Murray Valley Highway for a short period, before continuing south through flat open country through Rochester, Elmore and Heathcote, then traverses moderately hilly terrain through Kilmore and Wallan, before eventually terminating at the interchange with Hume Freeway a short distance south of Wallan in Beveridge.

== History ==
The passing of the Country Roads Act 1912 through the Parliament of Victoria provided for the establishment of the Country Roads Board (later VicRoads) and their ability to declare Main Roads, taking responsibility for the management, construction and care of the state's major roads from local municipalities. Kilmore-Heathcote(-Bendigo) Road was declared a Main Road, from Kilmore to Pyalong on 30 November 1914, and from Pyalong and Heathcote (and continuing west to Bendigo) on 28 May 1915; Heathcote-Elmore Road was declared a Main Road, between Tooleen and Elmore on 17 March 1915, and between Heathcote and Tooleen on 28 May 1915; and Bendigo-Echuca Road was declared a Main Road, between north-eastern Bendigo and Elmore on 17 May 1915, and from Elmore through Rochester to Echuca on 27 July 1916.

The passing of the Highways and Vehicles Act 1924 provided for the declaration of State Highways, roads two-thirds financed by the state government through the Country Roads Board. Northern Highway was declared a State Highway on 1 July 1925, cobbled from a collection of roads from Bendigo through Elmore and Rochester to Echuca (for a total of 55 miles), subsuming the original declaration of Bendigo-Echuca Road. In the 1947/48 financial year, its southern end was rerouted south of Elmore: instead of running to Bendigo, it was extended further south via Heathcote to meet Hume Highway at Kilmore, subsuming the original declarations of Heathcote-Elmore Road and Kilmore-Heathcote-Bendigo Road as Main Roads; the previous alignment of Northern Highway from Elmore to Bendigo was subsumed into Midland Highway. Northern Highway was extended south one last time when the Kilmore bypass was opened in 1976, from Kilmore to Beveridge (just south of Wallan) along the former alignment of Hume Highway.

Northern Highway was later signed National Route 75 in 1955; with Victoria's conversion to the newer alphanumeric system in the late 1990s, this was updated to route B75.

The passing of the Road Management Act 2004 granted the responsibility of overall management and development of Victoria's major arterial roads to VicRoads: in 2022, VicRoads re-declared this road as Northern Highway (Arterial #6540), beginning in Echuca and ending in Beveridge.

== Attractions ==
- Heathcote-Graytown National Park

== Major intersections and towns ==
State	LGA	Location	km	mi	Destinations	Notes
New South Wales	Murray River	Moama	0.0	0.0	Cobb Highway (B75) – Deniliquin, Hay, Wilcannia	Southern terminus of Cobb Highway, route B75 continues north
New South Wales	Murray River		0.0	0.0	Dhungala Bridge	
State border			0.0	0.0	New South Wales – Victoria state border	
Victoria	Campaspe	Echuca	0.0	0.0	Northern Highway (B75)	Northern terminus of Northern Highway
Victoria	Campaspe River		1.1	0.68	Yakoa Bridge	
Victoria	Campaspe	Echuca	1.5	0.93	Warren Street (C349) – Echuca, Moama	Roundabout
Victoria	Campaspe	Echuca	3.0	1.9	Murray Valley Highway (B400 north) – Kerang, Swan Hill, Mildura	Concurrency with route B400
Victoria	Campaspe	Echuca	4.2	2.6	Murray Valley Highway (B400 east) – Cobram, Wodonga, Corryong	Concurrency with route B400
Victoria	Campaspe	Echuca	8.9	5.5	Echuca-Mitiamo Road (C334) – Mitiamo, Durham Ox	
Victoria	Campaspe	Ballendella	22.6	14.0	Prairie-Rochester Road (C341) – Tennyson, Prairie	
Victoria	Waranga Western Channel		25.9	16.1	Bridge (name unknown)	
Victoria	Campaspe	Rochester	29.3	18.2	Webb Road (C362) – Kyabram, to Heathcote-Rochester Road (C347 south) – Corop, Heathcote	
Victoria	Campaspe	Rochester	29.8	18.5	Echuca railway line	
Victoria	Greater Bendigo	Elmore	46.7	29.0	Elmore–Raywood Road (C337) – Kamarooka, Raywood	
Victoria	Greater Bendigo	Elmore	47.1	29.3	Midland Highway (A300 west) – Bendigo, Ballarat, Geelong	Concurrency with route A300
Victoria	Campaspe	Runnymede	48.7	30.3	Midland Highway (A300 east) – Shepparton, Benalla, Mansfield	Concurrency with route A300
Victoria	Campaspe	Creek View	60.3	37.5	Bendigo-Murchison Road (C345) – Rushworth, Murchison, Violet Town	
Victoria	Greater Bendigo	Ladys Pass	85.5	53.1	Heathcote-Rochester Road (C347 north) – Corop, Elmore	
Victoria	McIvor Creek		96.2	59.8	Bridge (name unknown)	
Victoria	Greater Bendigo	Heathcote	96.3	59.8	McIvor Highway (B280) – Axedale, Bendigo	
Victoria	Greater Bendigo	Heathcote	97.2	60.4	Heathcote-Redesdale Road (C326) – Redesdale, Kyneton	
Victoria	Greater Bendigo	Argyle	101.7	63.2	Heathcote-Nagambie Road (C344) – Nagambie	
Victoria	Mitchell	Tooborac	113.7	70.6	Seymour-Tooborac Road (C384) – Puckapunyal, Seymour	
Victoria	Mitchell	Tooborac	114.9	71.4	Lancefield–Tooborac Road (C325) – Lancefield, Sunbury	
Victoria	Mitchell	Kilmore	144.0	89.5	Broadford–Kilmore Road (C311) – Broadford	
Victoria	Mitchell	Kilmore	147.3	91.5	Kilmore-Lancefield Road (C324) – Lancefield, Woodend	
Victoria	Mitchell	Kilmore	150.7	93.6	Wandong Road (C729) – Wandong, Epping	
Victoria	Mitchell	Wallan	161.2	100.2	Watson Street (C727 east, unallocated west) – Whittlesea, to Hume Freeway (M31 north) – Seymour, Wodonga, Sydney	
Victoria	Mitchell	Beveridge	164.8	102.4	Hume Freeway (M31 south) – Craigieburn, Thomastown, Melbourne	Southern terminus of highway and route B75; Southern exit and northern entrance only
1.000 mi = 1.609 km; 1.000 km = 0.621 mi: Concurrency terminus; Incomplete access; Route transition

== See also ==
- Highways in Australia
- List of highways in Victoria
