= Axedale railway station =

Former railway station in Victoria, Australia

Coordinates: 36.7851°S 144.4864°E

The Axedale railway station was a railway station on the former Heathcote railway line in Victoria, serving the town of Axedale.

The station opened with the line in October 1888. The proposed station site was heavily criticised for its distance from both Axedale township and the Axedale Racecourse, but calls to re-site the station closer to the town were unsuccessful. There was a further unsuccessful effort in 1890 to have the station relocated, following the opening of a picnic siding closer to Axedale than the station.

During its first month of operation, more than a thousand tons of goods were handled at the station. However, by 1901, the Acting Commissioner of Railways cabled that the passenger traffic at Axedale was "not sufficient to justify any expenditure on the station buildings". Despite that, the Shire of Strathfieldsaye continued to lobby for better passenger facilities, and the construction of cattle pits at the station.

In 1907, the station won a prize as "the most picturesque station in its section". A telegraph office at the station opened c. 1910 and closed c. 1917. The council's lobbying eventually resulted in the station gates being replaced with cattle grids in 1912. A siding opened near the station in the late 1920s to serve a new municipal quarry.

Passenger services to the station ceased in December 1941, along with those on the rest of the line, and the line closed to all traffic in December 1958. Most of a significant 610m-long timber bridge over the Campaspe River at Axedale was demolished in 1972, though a small section survives on private property.

The Bendigo-Kilmore Rail Trail now passes through the station site. In 2018, the Friends of the Bendigo-Kilmore Rail Trail placed an historic railway wagon at the station site as a static display.
