= Swainsona plagiotropis =

Conservation status
- Vulnerable (EPBC Act)

Scientific classification
- Kingdom: Plantae
- Clade: Tracheophytes
- Clade: Angiosperms
- Clade: Eudicots
- Clade: Rosids
- Order: Fabales
- Family: Fabaceae
- Subfamily: Faboideae
- Genus: Swainsona
- Species: S. plagiotropis

Binomial name
- Swainsona plagiotropis F.Muell.

Synonyms
- Swainsonia plagiotropis F.Muell. orth. var.

Species of flowering plants

Swainsona plagiotropis, commonly known as red swainsona-pea is a species of flowering plant in the family Fabaceae and is endemic to eastern continental Australia. It is a prostrate or ascending perennial herb with imparipinnate leaves with 13 to 25 narrowly egg-shaped or narrowly lance-shaped leaflets and racemes of 2 to 5 reddish-purple flowers.

== Description ==
Swainsona plagiotropis is a prostrate or ascending perennial herb, that typically grows to a height of up to 15 cm (5.9 in) and sometimes has hairy stems. Its leaves are imparipinnate, mostly 50–120 mm (2.0–4.7 in) long with 13 to 25 narrowly elliptic or narrowly egg-shaped leaflets with the narrower end towards the base, the side leaflets 10–17 mm (0.39–0.67 in) long and 1–4 mm (0.039–0.157 in) wide with broadly egg-shaped stipules mostly 5–9 mm (0.20–0.35 in) long at the base of the petioles. The flowers are reddish-purple, arranged in racemes of 2 to 5, the flowers 10–15 mm (0.39–0.59 in) long, on a hairy pedicel about 3 mm (0.12 in) long. The sepals are joined at the base to form a tube about 2.5 mm (0.098 in) long, with lobes longer than the tube. The standard petal is 12–15 mm (0.47–0.59 in) long and 10–20 mm (0.39–0.79 in) wide, the wings about 8–10 mm (0.31–0.39 in) long and the keel about 9–10 mm (0.35–0.39 in) long and 4–5 mm (0.16–0.20 in) deep. Flowering occurs from August to November, and the fruit is an oval to oblong pod 15–25 mm (0.59–0.98 in) long and 8–10 mm (0.31–0.39 in) long, with the remains of the strongly curved style 8–9 mm (0.31–0.35 in) long.

== Taxonomy and naming ==
Swainsona plagiotropis was first formally described in 1875 by Ferdinand von Mueller in his Fragmenta Phytographiae Australiae from a specimen he collected near the junction of the Murray and Campaspe Rivers.

== Distribution ==
Red swainson-pea grows in grassland, often in table drains in the west of New South Wales and a few places in north-central Victoria, mostly along the upper Murray River.

== Conservation status ==
Swainsona plagiotropis is listed as "vulnerable" under the Australian Government Environment Protection and Biodiversity Conservation Act 1999 and the Victorian Government, the New South Wales Government Biodiversity Conservation Act 2016 and the Victorian Government Flora and Fauna Guarantee Act 1988.
