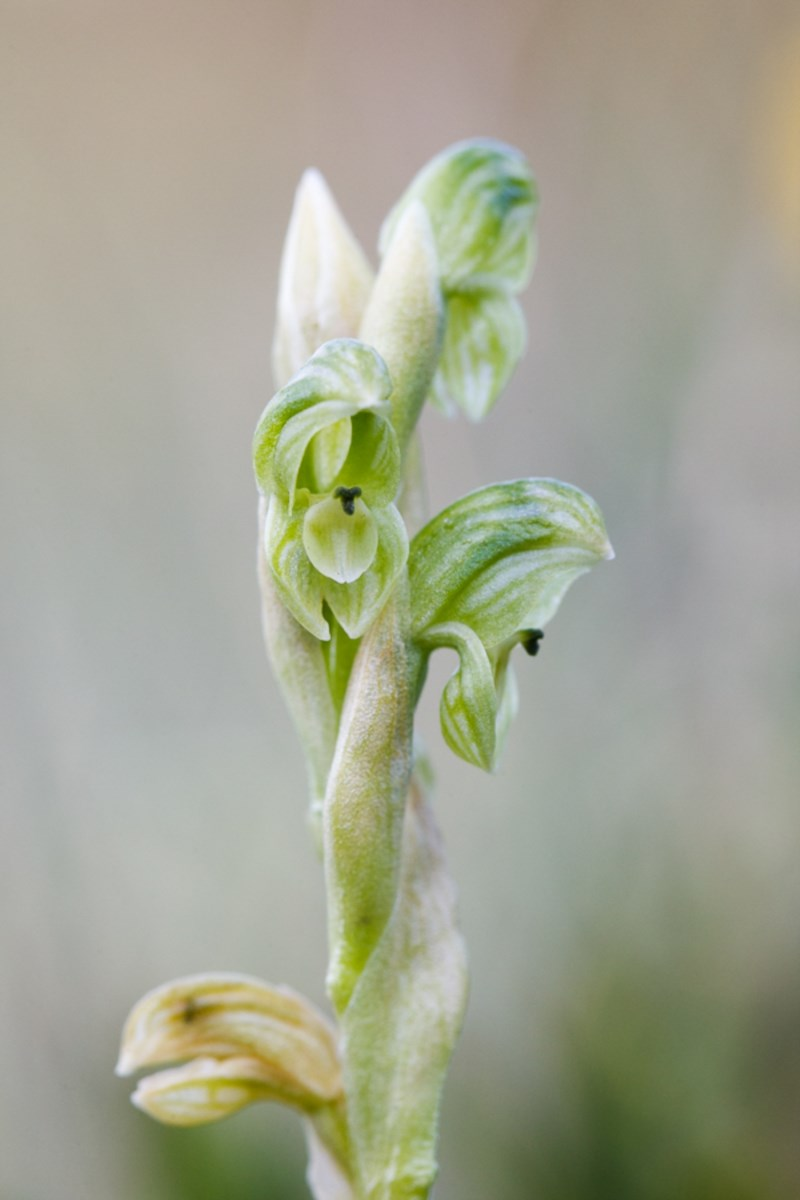
- Pterostylis crassicaulis growing in Namadgi National Park

Scientific classification
- Kingdom: Plantae
- Clade: Tracheophytes
- Clade: Angiosperms
- Clade: Monocots
- Order: Asparagales
- Family: Orchidaceae
- Subfamily: Orchidoideae
- Tribe: Cranichideae
- Genus: Pterostylis
- Species: P. crassicaulis

Binomial name
- Pterostylis crassicaulis (D.L.Jones & M.A.Clem.) G.N.Backh.

Synonyms
- Hymenochilus crassicaulis D.L.Jones & M.A.Clem.

= Pterostylis crassicaulis =

Alpine swan greenhood

Species of orchid

Pterostylis crassicaulis, commonly known as the alpine swan greenhood, is a plant in the orchid family Orchidaceae and is endemic to south-eastern Australia. It has a rosette of leaves and up to 18 bluish-green and white flowers with dark green stripes. The flowers have a labellum with a dark green, beak-like appendage. It is similar to P. cycnocephala but is more robust and grows at higher altitudes.

== Description ==
Pterostylis crassicaulis, is a terrestrial, perennial, deciduous, herb with an underground tuber. It has a rosette of between five and eight crowded, dark green leaves at the base of the flowering spike, each leaf 20–45 mm (0.8–2 in) long and 10–25 mm (0.4–1 in) wide. Between 5 and 18 shiny bluish-green and white flowers with dark green lines and 9–11 mm (0.35–0.43 in) long are borne on a flowering spike up to 300 mm (10 in) tall. Four to six stem leaves are wrapped loosely around the flowering spike. The dorsal sepal and petals form a hood or "galea" over the column. The dorsal sepal is curved forwards with the sides turned down. The lateral sepals turn downwards, are 6–8 mm (0.2–0.3 in) long and wide, dished and joined near their bases. The labellum is oblong to egg-shaped, about 2–3 mm (0.08–0.1 in) long and wide, pale green with a dark green, beak-like appendage pointing forward at its base. Flowering occurs from December to January.

== Taxonomy and naming ==
The alpine swan greenhood was first formally described in 2008 by David Jones and Mark Clements and given the name Hymenochilus crassicaulis. The description was published in The Orchadian from a specimen collected in the Kosciuszko National Park. In 2010, Gary Backhouse changed the name to Pterostylis crassicaulis, publishing the change in The Victorian Naturalist. The specific epithet (crassicaulis) is derived from the Latin words crassus meaning "thick", "fat" or "stout" and caulis meaning "stalk" or "stem".

== Distribution and habitat ==
The alpine swan greenhood grows in alpine and subalpine grasslands and herbfields in eastern Victoria and on the Southern Tablelands of New South Wales.
