= Cairn Curran Reservoir =

Dam and reservoir in Victoria, Australia

Cairn Curran Dam
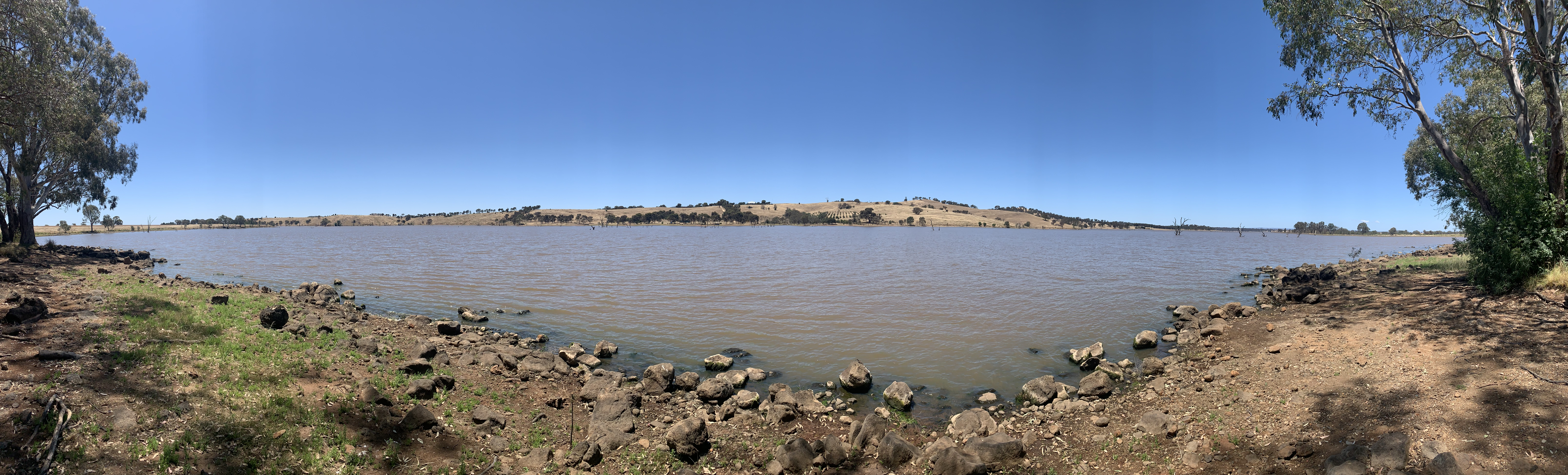
- The reservoir in 2023

- Location of the dam in Victoria
- Interactive map of Cairn Curran Dam
- Country: Australia
- Location: Castlemaine, Victoria
- Coordinates: 36°59′21″S 143°58′02″E
- Purpose: Irrigation; Hydroelectricity
- Status: Operational
- Construction began: 1947
- Opening date: 1956
- Owner: Goulburn-Murray Water

Dam and spillways
- Type of dam: Earth fill dam
- Impounds: Loddon River
- Height: 44 m (144 ft)
- Length: 1,548 m (5,079 ft)
- Dam volume: 811×10^{3} m^{3} (28.6×10^{6} cu ft)
- Spillways: 1
- Spillway type: Controlled
- Spillway capacity: 4,100 cubic metres per second (140,000 cu ft/s)

Reservoir
- Creates: Cairn Curran Reservoir
- Total capacity: 148 GL (120,000 acre⋅ft)
- Catchment area: 1,593 km^{2} (615 sq mi)
- Surface area: 1,900 ha (4,700 acres)
- Normal elevation: 203 m (666 ft) AHD

Cairn Curran Power Station
- Operator: AGL Energy
- Commission date: c. 1956
- Decommission date: in progress (due by July 2026)
- Type: Conventional
- Turbines: 1 x 2 MW (2,700 hp)
- Installed capacity: 2 MW (2,700 hp)
- Annual generation: 2 GWh (7.2 TJ)

The Cairn Curran Reservoir is a reservoir formed as a result of the Cairn Curran Dam, an earth-filled embankment dam across the Loddon River, located near the townships of Baringhup, Newstead and Welshmans Reef, in Victoria, Australia. Completed between 1947 and 1956, the reservoir supplies water for irrigation and the generation of hydroelectricity via the adjacent Cairn Curran Power Station, a conventional hydroelectric power station.

The dam and reservoir is operated by Goulburn-Murray Water.

== Dam and reservoir overview ==
This earth-filled dam wall is 44 metres (144 ft) high and 1,548 metres (5,079 ft) long. When full, the reservoir has capacity of 148 gigalitres (120,000 acre⋅ft) and covers 1,900 hectares (4,700 acres), drawn from a catchment area of 1,593 square kilometres (615 sq mi). The controlled spillway has a flow capacity of 4,100 cubic metres per second (140,000 cu ft/s). The complex includes a secondary embankment that is 15 metres (49 ft) high and 853 metres (2,799 ft) long.

Primarily an irrigation reservoir, it is home to an active yacht club and is a popular freshwater fishing and water-skiing destination. Other reservoirs in the Loddon River catchment include the Newlyn, Hepburns, Tullaroop, and Laanecoorie reservoirs.

== Hydroelectric power station ==
The Cairn Curran Power Station is operated by AGL Energy. It has an installed capacity of 2 megawatts (2,700 hp) and generates electricity when irrigation and flood releases are made. The average annual output is 2 gigawatt-hours (7.2 TJ). The generator has not been operated since 2017 and, in 2021, AGL reported that decommissioning of the generator is in progress, estimated to be completed by July 2026.

== Gallery ==
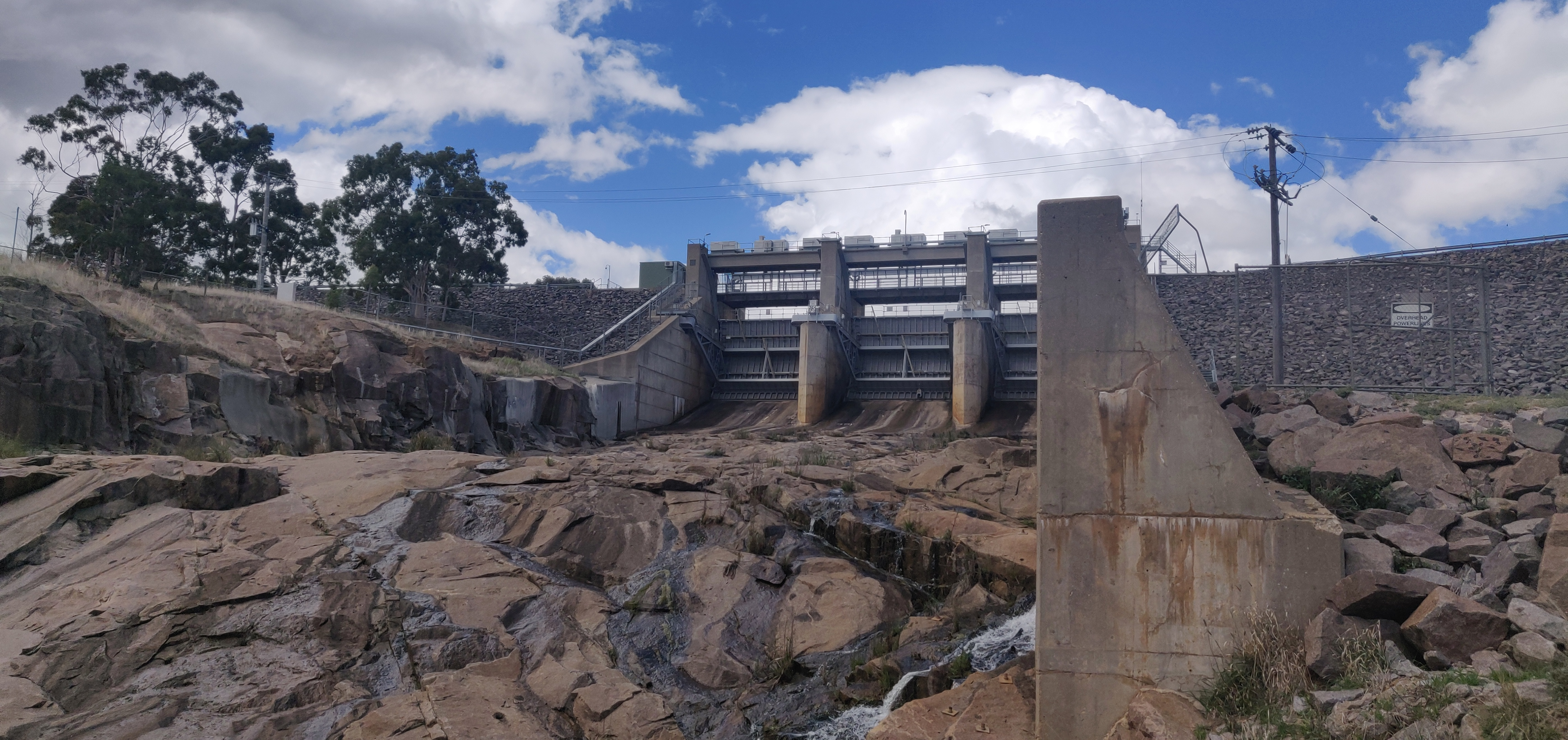
View of the dam spillway, 2021

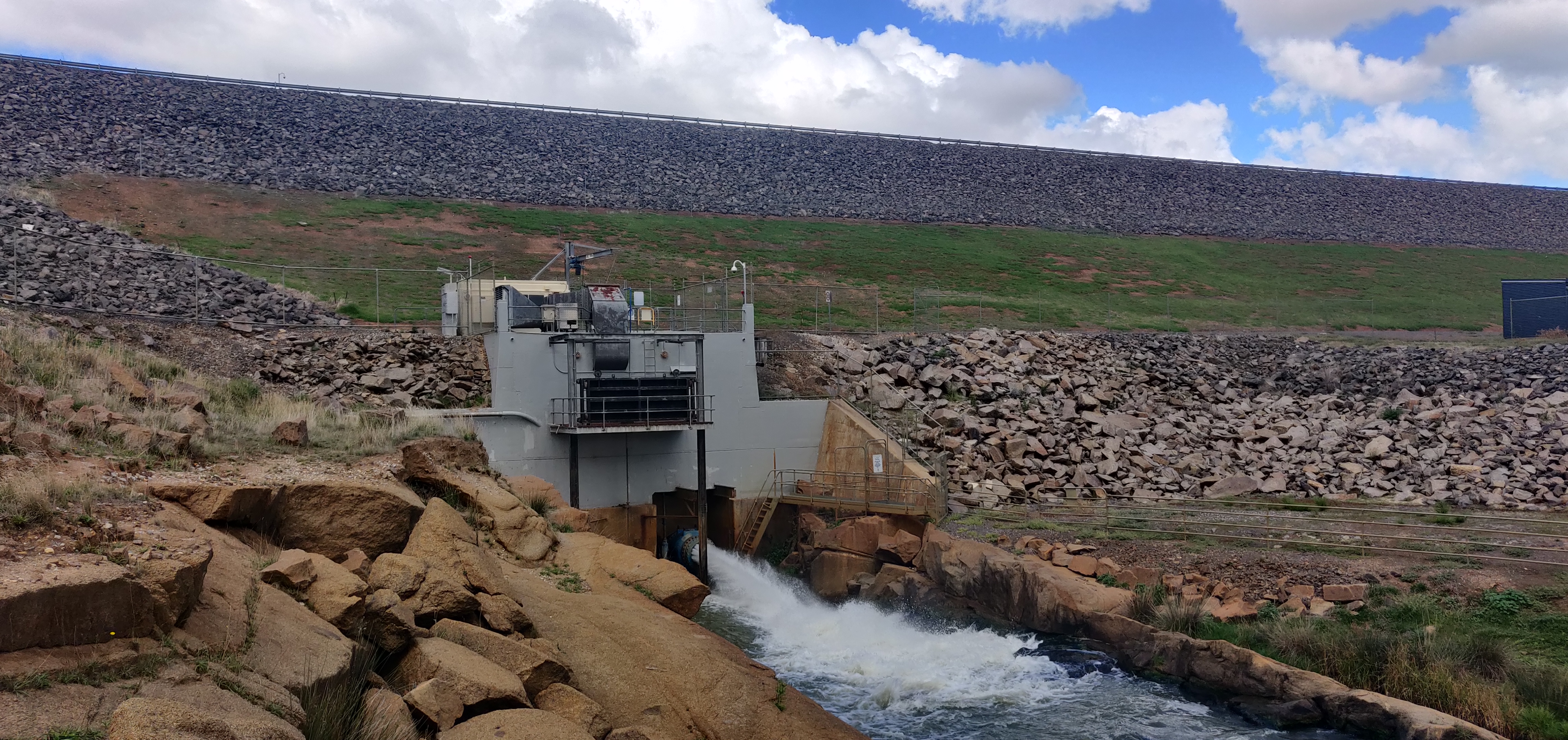
Rock dam wall and outlet pipe, 2021

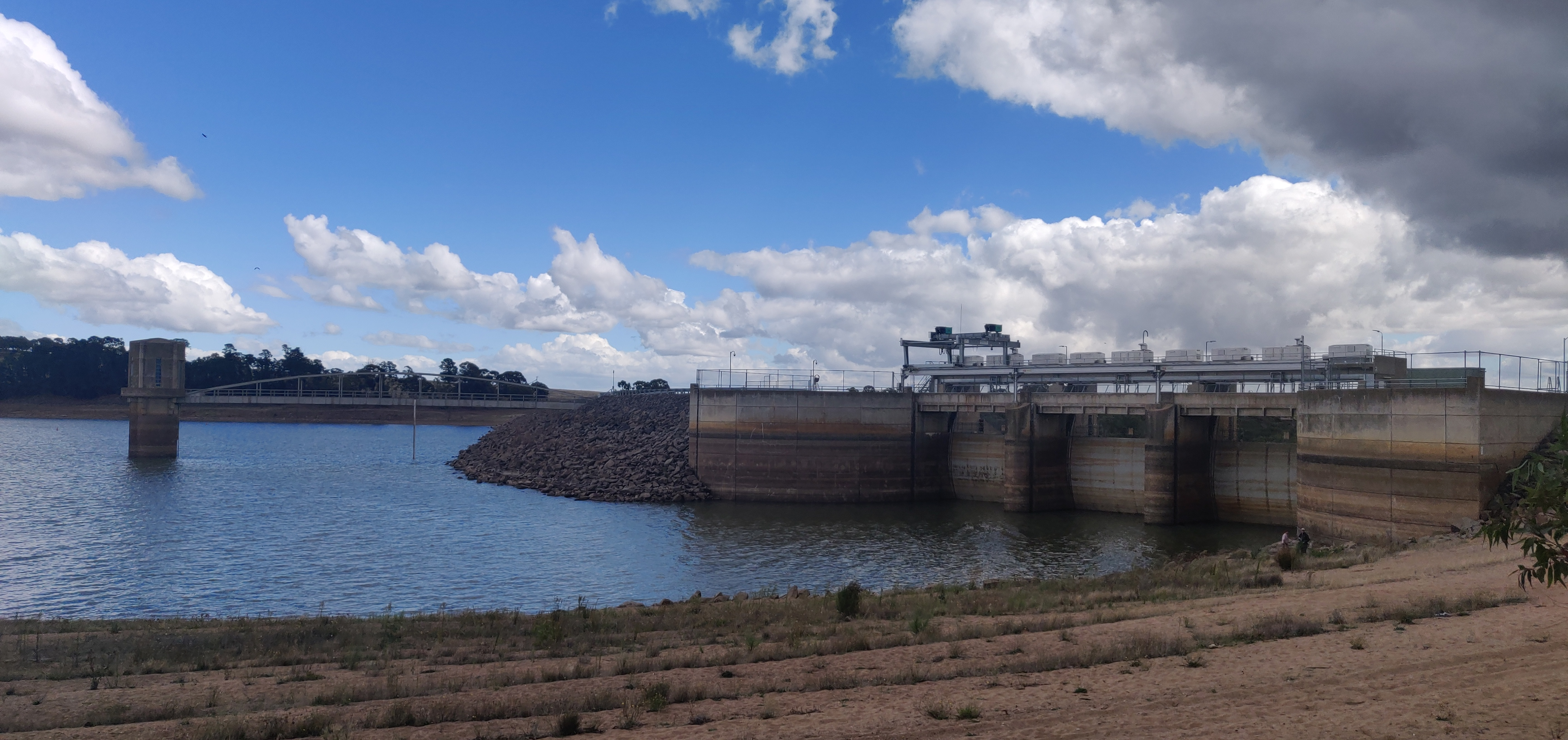
Rear of the dam wall and outlet tower, 2021

== See also ==
- List of dams and reservoirs in Victoria
- List of power stations in Victoria
