= 1909 Western Victorian floods =

Natural disaster in Victoria, Australia

The 1909 Western Victorian floods consisted of widespread flooding on rivers of the western half of the State of Victoria during the middle of August that year.

== Meteorological background ==
Persistent above-average rainfall began to affect most of Victoria apart from eastern Gippsland in April 1909 as a result of strong southern low-pressure systems interacting with moisture in the Indian Ocean. Although April and May were moist, June was exceptionally wet, seeing in many places (e.g. Melbourne) a record number of rainy days for any month. The heavy June falls had already made the ground throughout Victoria very moist, and despite the fact that July rainfall was only above normal in the north of the State was of relatively little significance as evaporation was too low to dry the ground.

== The floods ==
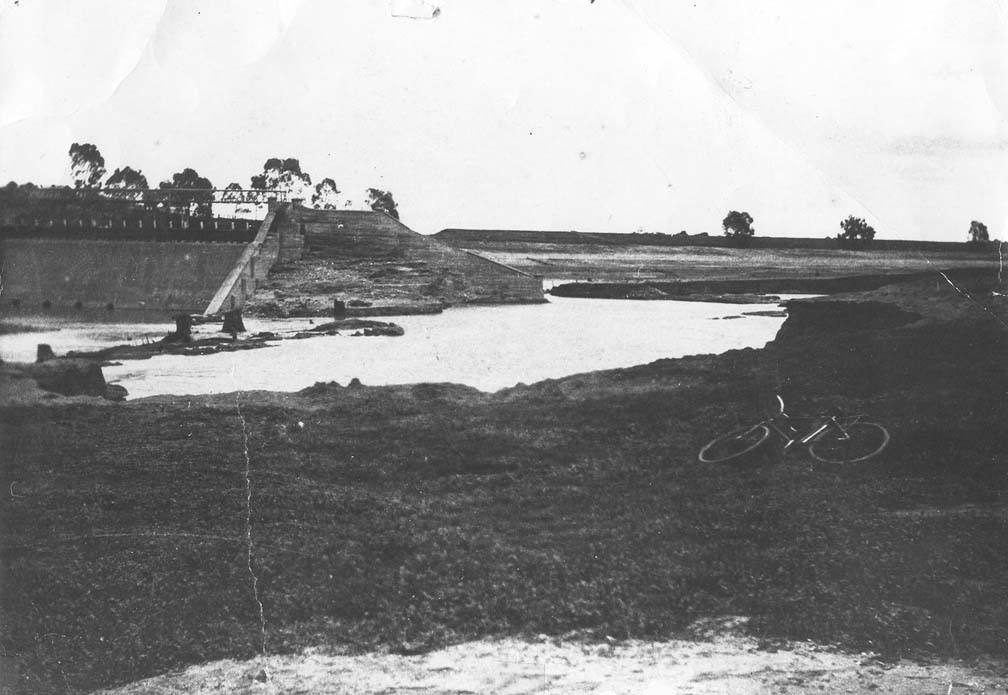
The breach in the Laanecoorie Weir following the 1909 flood.

With these moist conditions, it was natural that heavy rain in August would cause major flooding on the State's rivers, and a series of very slow-moving depressions naturally caused August to be very wet. As early as 11 August major flooding on the Richardson River at Donald was anticipated.

The third of four major depressions for the month arrived in western Victoria on the 17th and produced very heavy falls upon already-saturated catchments on flat land where water was not draining away quickly. As the slow-moving depression linked with warm air from the Tasman Sea, thunderstorms began to develop over the Wimmera region on the 18th. Rich Avon recorded 50mm (2 inches) from one of these whilst in the Great Divide there were reports that some areas had received as much as 100mm (4 inches) in as little as six hours.

As a result of this heavy rain, many rivers rose to record or near-record levels. The Avoca River rose above the top of sheds of farmhouses near its banks, as the Hopkins and the Merri River near the coast. Further east, houses at Inglewood were swamped and many buildings were wrecked by the swollen Loddon River. In Donald itself, not only roads, but even footpaths were devastated as the Richardson River flooded the town to a level never seen before or since, eventually reaching normally-dry Lake Buloke. Near Geelong, four people were drowned trying to cross the flooded Barwon River at Winchelsea.

The floods had a major impact upon agriculture in the region, with many crops in the Western District completely destroyed through being soaked - not only during the floods, but also before they reached their peak. Large numbers of sheep in the Western District were killed because of foot-rot due to the wet ground.

Unusually for floods in Australia, not only did the rivers recede rapidly but the excessively wet conditions of the autumn and winter that produced them gave way to much drier weather from September onwards so that a repeat was never remotely possible. Flooding during August 1909 also happened in South Australia, the northeast of Victoria and more northerly parts of the Murray-Darling Basin; however, these were not as unusual as those in the Wimmera and Western District.
