= Welshmans Reef =

Welshmans Reef Victoria
- Coordinates: 37°04′01″S 144°02′43″E
- Population: 210 (2021 census)
- Postcode(s): 3462
- LGA(s): Shire of Mount Alexander
- State electorate(s): Bendigo West
- Federal division(s): Bendigo

Welshmans Reef is a locality in the Shire of Mount Alexander, Victoria, Australia. At the 2021 census, Welshmans Reef had a population of 210.

Welshmans Reef is situated between the eastern edge of the Cairn Curran Reservoir and the Maldon State Forest.

== History ==
The name likely originates from a Welshman discovering a gold-bearing reef in the area, which fits the pattern of significant Welsh and Methodist settlement in the area.

During the gold rush era, the area saw modest development, with the nearby Loddon River flats enabling some miners to transition into farming. A school was established in 1877 to serve the community.

The construction of the Cairn Curran Reservoir in 1956 resulted in much of the river flats being covered by water, altering the local landscape and affecting agricultural activity. The school closed in 1965.
