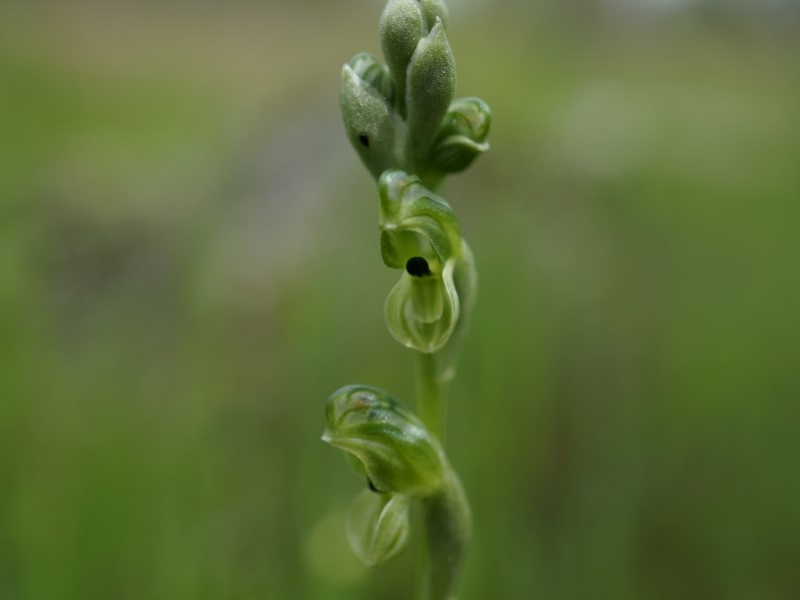

Scientific classification
- Kingdom: Plantae
- Clade: Tracheophytes
- Clade: Angiosperms
- Clade: Monocots
- Order: Asparagales
- Family: Orchidaceae
- Subfamily: Orchidoideae
- Tribe: Cranichideae
- Genus: Pterostylis
- Species: P. bicolor

Binomial name
- Pterostylis bicolor D.L.Jones & M.A.Clem.

Synonyms
- Pterostylis bicolor R.Br.; Oligochaetochilus bicolor (D.L.Jones & M.A.Clem.) Szlach.; Hymenochilus bicolor (D.L.Jones & M.A.Clem.) D.L.Jones & M.A.Clem.

= Pterostylis bicolor =

Black-tip greenhood

Species of orchid

Pterostylis bicolor, commonly known as the black-tip greenhood, is a plant in the orchid family Orchidaceae and is endemic to south-eastern Australia. It has a rosette of leaves and when flowering, three to ten well-spaced, bright green flowers with a blunt, greenish-black appendage on the labellum. It is similar to the swan orchid, Pterostylis cycnocephala but that species has a beak-like appendage and crowded flowers.

== Description ==
Pterostylis bicolor, is a terrestrial, perennial, deciduous, herb with an underground tuber. It has a rosette of between five and twelve dark green leaves, each leaf 10–35 mm (0.4–1 in) long and 3–15 mm (0.1–0.6 in) wide. When flowering there are between three and ten well-spaced, bright shiny green flowers 8–11 mm (0.3–0.4 in) long and 4–5 mm (0.2–0.2 in) wide on a flowering spike 80–300 mm (3–10 in) tall. Six to eleven stem leaves are wrapped around the flowering spike. The dorsal sepal and petals form a hood or "galea" over the column. The lateral sepals turn downwards, 6–7 mm (0.2–0.3 in) long and 7–8 mm (0.28–0.31 in) wide, dished and joined for most of their length. The labellum is egg-shaped, 3 mm (0.1 in) long and 2 mm (0.08 in) wide, with a greenish-black, blunt, ridged, forward pointing appendage. Flowering occurs from August to November.

== Taxonomy and naming ==
Pterostylis bicolor was first formally described in 1987 by David Jones & Mark Clements and the description was published in Proceedings of the Royal Society of Queensland. The specific epithet (bicolor) is a Latin word meaning "two-coloured".

== Distribution and habitat ==
The black-tip greenhood is widespread in New South Wales and found in scattered populations in Victoria. It grows in grassy woodland and forest.
