= Laanecoorie Weir =

Lake in Victoria, Australia

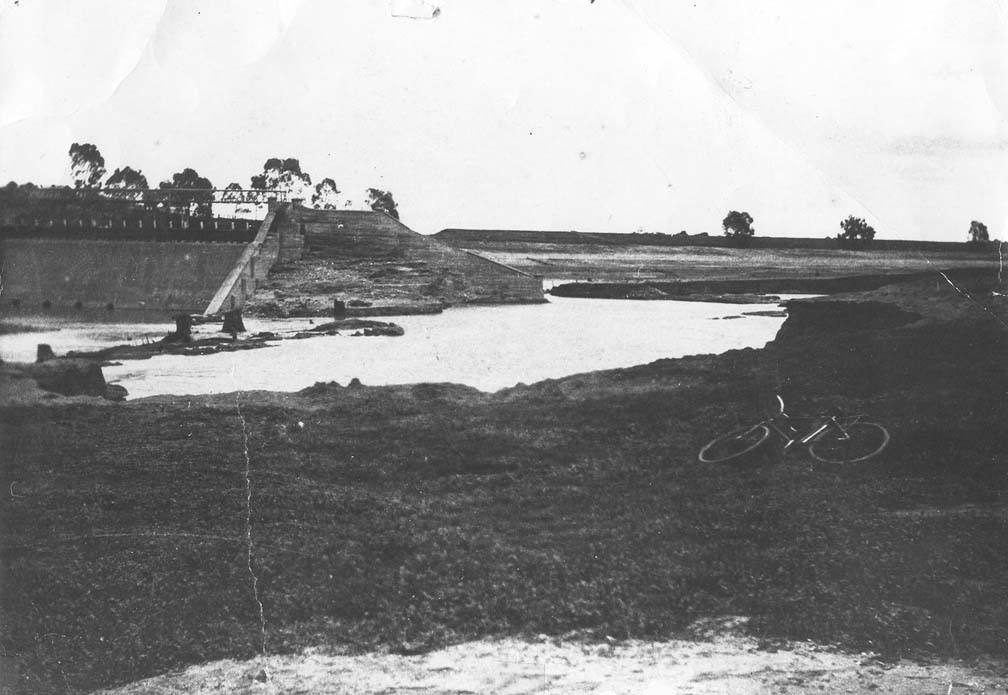
- A breach in the weir, following the 1909 flood

- Location of the dam in Victoria
- Interactive map of Laanecoorie Weir
- Country: Australia
- Location: near Maryborough, Loddon Mallee, Victoria
- Coordinates: 36°50′02″S 143°53′31″E
- Purpose: Irrigation
- Status: Operational
- Construction began: 1889
- Opening date: 1891
- Built by: Andrew O'Keefe; Joshua Thomas Noble Anderson
- Operator: Goulburn-Murray Water

Dam and spillways
- Type of dam: Gravity dam; Earth-filled dam
- Impounds: Loddon River
- Height (foundation): 22 m (72 ft)
- Length: 399 m (1,309 ft)
- Spillways: 1
- Spillway type: Controlled
- Spillway capacity: 71 m^{3}/s (2,500 cu ft/s)

Reservoir
- Creates: Laanecoorie Reservoir
- Total capacity: 8,000 ML (6,500 acre⋅ft)
- Catchment area: 4,170 km^{2} (1,610 sq mi)
- Surface area: 488 ha (1,210 acres)
- Maximum water depth: 163 m (535 ft) AHD
- Website g-mwater.com.au

The Laanecoorie Weir is a concrete gravity and earth-filled embankment dam across the Loddon River, located near the towns of Laanecoorie and Eddington, in the Loddon Mallee region of Victoria, Australia. Completed in 1891 as a weir, the resultant reservoir, the Laanecoorie Reservoir, was established for the purposes of irrigation and the supply of potable water. The dam is operated by Goulburn-Murray Water.

== Dam and reservoir overview ==
=== Dam ===
The dam was constructed by contractor Andrew O'Keefe in conjunction with Joshua Thomas Noble Anderson and it was the second irrigation scheme for Victoria after the Goulburn Weir. Construction commenced in 1889 and took three years to complete. The largest outlet valves in Victoria, manufactured by the United Iron Work of Abraham Roberts, were installed at the weir in 1891.

The earth-filled dam wall is 22 metres (72 ft) high and 399 metres (1,309 ft) long. When full, the Laanecoorie Reservoir has capacity of 8,000 megalitres (6,500 acre⋅ft) and covers 488 hectares (1,210 acres), drawn from a catchment area of 4,170 square kilometres (1,610 sq mi). The controlled spillway has a flow capacity of 71 cubic metres per second (2,500 cu ft/s). Extensions to the spillway were completed in 1909, and the spillways was raised to its current height in 1935.

=== Reservoir ===
The towns of Tarnagulla, Dunolly, and Laanecoorie obtain supply by diversion from the Loddon River downstream of the reservoir. The reservoir is part of a chain of reservoirs along the Loddon River, including the Newlyn, Tullaroop and Cairn Curran reservoirs and the Hepburns Lagoon.

Substantial siltation since construction of the dam wall has reduced the original capacity of the reservoir by an estimated 12,000 megalitres (9,700 acre⋅ft).

The great flood of 1909 breached the weir and 18.3 gigalitres (14,800 acre⋅ft) flowed through the opening and causing severe damage to all towns downstream. The first bridge at Laanecoorie over the Loddon River, built in 1870, was destroyed in the 1909 flood, along with the weir. General Sir John Monash designed and built a new bridge of reinforced concrete beam and slab construction, which remains in use.

== See also ==
- List of dams and reservoirs in Victoria
- Irrigation in Australia
