= McIvor Highway =

McIvor Highway Victoria
- Coordinates: 36.755538°S 144.284244°E (West end); 36.907902°S 144.694585°E (East end)

General information
- Type: Highway
- Length: 44.0 km (27 mi)
- Gazetted: May 1915 (as Main Road); 1959/60 (as State Highway)
- Route number(s): B280 (1998–present)
- Former route number: State Route 141 (1986–1998)

Major junctions
- West end: Chapel Street; Bendigo, Victoria
- Midland Highway; Strathdale–White Hills Road
- East end: Northern Highway; Heathcote, Victoria

Location(s)
- Region: Loddon Mallee
- Major settlements: Axedale

Highway system
- Highways in Australia; National Highway • Freeways in Australia; Highways in Victoria

McIvor Highway is a short Victorian highway (44 km) linking Bendigo and Heathcote. Together with Hume Freeway (until Wallan) and Northern Highway (until Heathcote), it provides an alternative route between Melbourne and Bendigo. The name 'McIvor' refers to the original name of the Heathcote region, used during the Victorian gold rush.

== Route ==
McIvor Highway commences at the intersection with Midland Highway in Bendigo and heads in an easterly direction as a two-lane, single carriageway rural highway through Axedale, before it crosses the Campaspe River then continues in a south-easterly direction past the eastern shores of Lake Eppalock before it eventually terminates at the intersection with Northern Highway at Heathcote.

== History ==
The passing of the Country Roads Act 1912 through the Parliament of Victoria provided for the establishment of the Country Roads Board (later VicRoads) and their ability to declare Main Roads, taking responsibility for the management, construction and care of the state's major roads from local municipalities. (Kilmore-)Heathcote-Bendigo Road was declared a Main Road, between Axedale to Heathcote (and continuing south-east to Kilmore) on 28 May 1915, and between Bendigo and Axedale on 21 June 1915.

The passing of the Highways and Vehicles Act 1924 provided for the declaration of State Highways, roads two-thirds financed by the State government through the Country Roads Board. Eppalock Highway was declared a State Highway in the 1959/60 financial year, from Heathcote to Bendigo (for a total of 27 miles), subsuming the original declaration of Kilmore-Heathcote-Bendigo Road as a Main Road. The highway was later renamed McIvor Highway in 1962.

McIvor Highway was signed as State Route 141 between Bendigo and Heathcote in 1986; with Victoria's conversion to the newer alphanumeric system in the late 1990s, this was replaced by route B280.

The passing of the Road Management Act 2004 granted the responsibility of overall management and development of Victoria's major arterial roads to VicRoads: in 2004, VicRoads re-declared the road as Pyrenees Highway (Arterial #6770) between Midland Highway in Bendigo and Northern Highway at Heathcote.

== Major intersections and towns ==
The entire highway is in the City of Greater Bendigo local government area.

Location	km	mi	Destinations	Notes
Bendigo	0.0	0.0	Chapel Street (C329 northwest) – North Bendigo, Eaglehawk, Kerang	Western terminus of highway and route B280
Bendigo	0.0	0.0	McCrae Street (A300 southwest, northeast) – Mildura, Melbourne, Echuca, Shepparton	
Strathdale	3.1	1.9	Powells Avenue (Strathdale–White Hills Road) (C343 north) – White Hills; Reservoir Road (Strathdale–White Hills Road) (C353 south) – Strathdale	Traffic light intersection
Campaspe River	21.0	13.0	Bridge name unknown	
Heathcote	44.0	27.3	Northern Highway (B75) – Echuca, Kilmore, Melbourne	Eastern terminus of highway and route B280 at T-intersection
1.000 mi = 1.609 km; 1.000 km = 0.621 mi: Route transition

== See also ==
- Highways in Australia
- List of highways in Victoria
