= Axedale =

Axedale Bendigo, Victoria
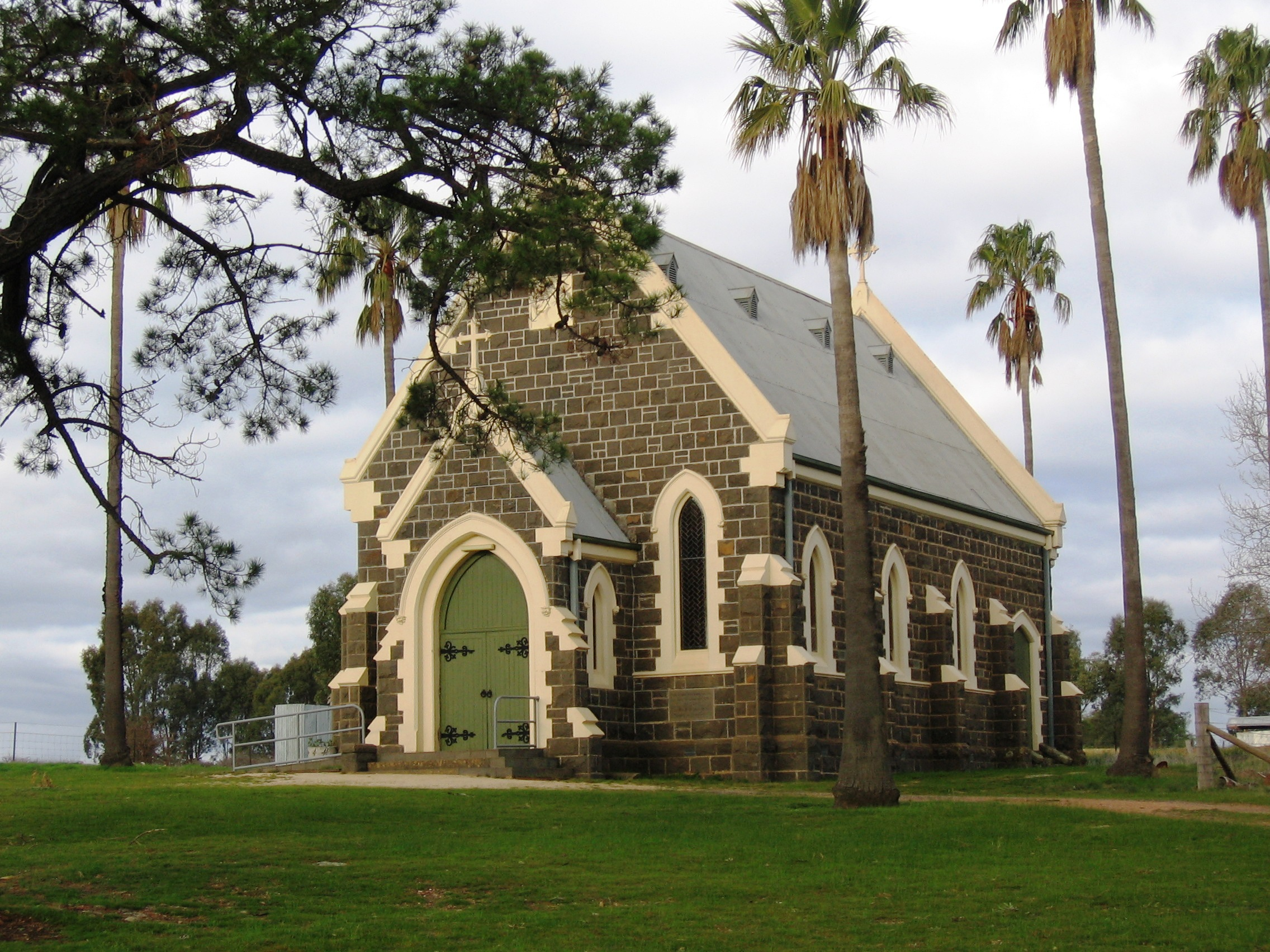
- Roman Catholic church

- Coordinates: 36°47′14″S 144°30′06″E
- Population: 984 (2021 census)
- Postcode(s): 3551
- Location: 145 km (90 mi) NW of Melbourne; 23 km (14 mi) E of Bendigo; 27 km (17 mi) NW of Heathcote
- LGA(s): City of Greater Bendigo
- State electorate(s): Bendigo East
- Federal division(s): Bendigo

Axedale is a town in Victoria, Australia. It is located on the McIvor Highway, in the City of Greater Bendigo, east of Bendigo. It was surveyed and proclaimed in 1861. At the 2021 census, Axedale had a population of 984.

The town is nestled alongside the Campaspe River which feeds out of Lake Eppalock. It has a golf course, tennis courts, a school, a pub, cafe, and a convenience store/petrol station. It lies along the Campaspe river crossing of McIvor Highway between Heathcote and Bendigo.

The Post Office opened on 21 April 1862. The town was served by the Axedale railway station on the Heathcote railway line from 1888 until 1941.

On Christmas Day 1929, the town was hit by a tornado that grew to a maximum width of 3 km (1.86 miles) wide. At the time one of the widest tornadoes in the world, no injuries or deaths were reported and the storm officially remains unrated by Australia's Bureau of Meteorology.

The town was the end point of the O'Keefe Rail Trail from Bendigo along the former railway reservation. In 2015, work was completed on extending the rail trail from Axedale to Heathcote. As part of the Campaspe River crossing, an underpass for the Rail Trail was also built under the McIvor Highway.

Golfers play at the Axedale Golf Club on Mitchell Street.

== Historic Places of Axedale ==
=== The Axedale Tavern ===
The Axedale Tavern was first established in 1855 By Feliks Drake along with three others from Ireland. After two years, Feliks Drake bought out the others and named the Tavern, Drakes Hotel and this was the name for almost a century until the business was renamed to The Axedale Tavern.

=== St Andrew's Uniting Church of Axedale ===
Axedale St Andrew's Uniting Church is located in the main street of Axedale. This church began construction on the 30th of September 1868 when foundation stone was laid and later opened in 1869. This church is still open and is used twice a month by a congregation of local families and is ministered by Rev Di Esbensen who also ministers St Andrew's Bendigo and St Andrews's Forest Street. She alternates between leading worship. St Andrew's Axedale is led by her in the first and third weeks of the month.

=== St Mary's Church of Axedale ===
St Mary's Church was originally blessed and opened on a Sunday the 9th of February 1862 and mass was held monthly up until the building became unsafe and demolished. In May 1900, the church committee held a meeting and decided to build a new church mostly from the bluestone bricks that previously built up the original church. Construction began on the 9th of December 1901 and the foundation stone was laid by Cishop Reville O.S.A of Sandhurst. The new Roman Catholic Church at Axedale is located at 15 Raglan Place in the centre of the township on a hill.

=== Axedale Catholic Cemetery ===
RPCV took over responsibility for the management and operations side of the privately owned Axedale Catholic Cemetery in 2016, which is residing next to the public Axedale Remembrance Park on Cemetery Road, Axedale. The distinguishing look to this cemetery from their neighbour Axedale Remembrance Park is that there are old stone fences featured and all around the site in this cemetery.

=== Camp Getaway Axedale ===
The Rotary Club of Bendigo made an initiative to create Camp Getaway Axedale as they had seen it as a necessity for a youth camp around the Bendigo Region. In 1948, the camp was opened to begin with the idea to give underprivileged children recreational facilities after the Second World War. The first ever guests were however a group of young farmers. An outdoor chapel was added to the area with the help of the Y's Men's Club in 1959. In 1961, at a cost of $2,000, a recreational hall was built in. More than 1,600 youth were enrolled and going to the camp each year by 1963. A new dining hall for the attendees to dine in was incorporated between 1968 and 1969 at an overall cost of $8,700 with a Government Grant of $4,300. A weekend to attend this camp at the time was 25 cents per person. Phone, power and a septic system were made accessible to the camp in around the year 1971. Thirty years later, the camp had gone through many upgrades in credit to the Rotarians and volunteers from the District 9800 which goes all the way from metropolitan Melbourne to the Murray at Echuca. Modern dormitory design accommodation is now incorporated in Camp Getaway Axedale such as a number of two bedroom units along with a lounge, dining room, kitchen and games room.

=== Axedale Golf Club ===
In the 1890s, Golf in Axedale was recorded. The eight founding members established the Axedale Golf Club and first played it on the site of the present course with nine sandscrape holes in 1937. From 1937 to 1956, despite setbacks as the fledgling club contending with the river flooding the course all the time, the Axedale Golf Club had competitions each winter weekend throughout the years. In 1973, the club was upgraded as well as in 1996, it was transformed to 18 holes with grass greens. Present day, the Axedale Golf Club has a membership of more than 450 people.

== Flooding of the Campaspe river ==
In October 2022 during a severe rain event, Lake Eppalock water reservoir at over capacity, spilled both its primary and secondary releases causing the Campaspe river to significantly flood causing devastating damage down stream. The flooding river water washed away the Axedale Bridge of the McIvor highway which caused a serious impact on the community.
