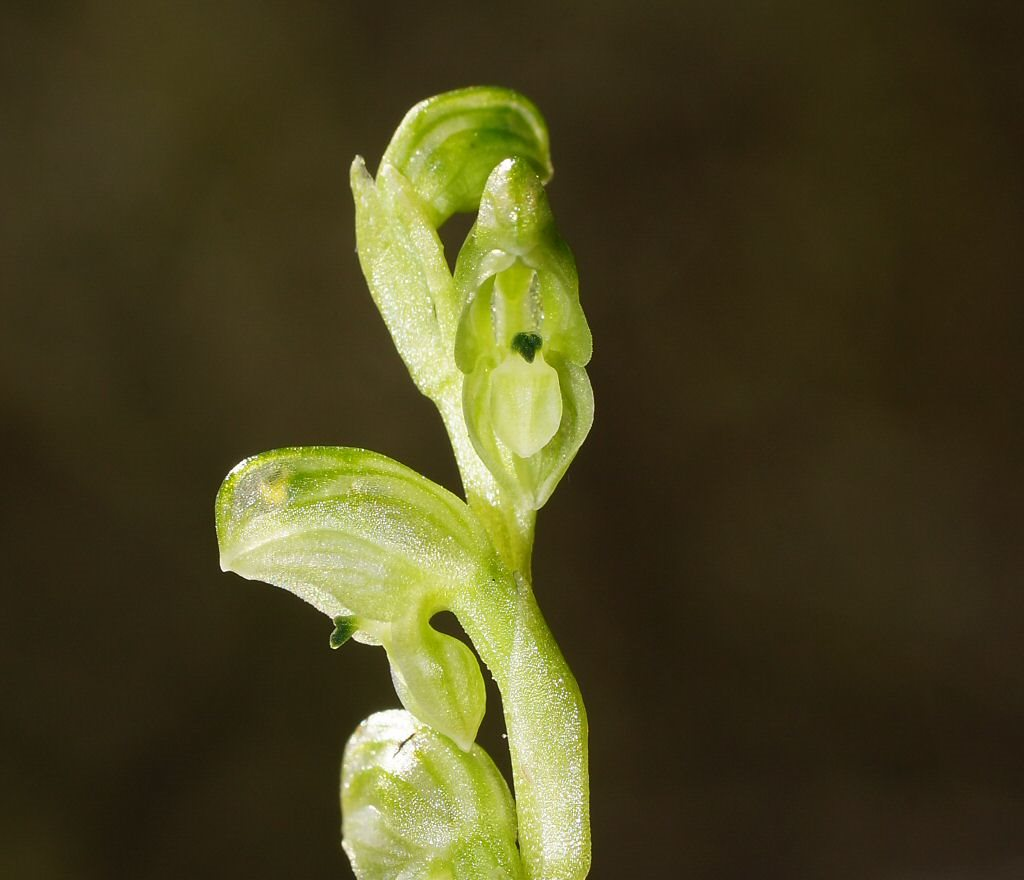

Scientific classification
- Kingdom: Plantae
- Clade: Tracheophytes
- Clade: Angiosperms
- Clade: Monocots
- Order: Asparagales
- Family: Orchidaceae
- Subfamily: Orchidoideae
- Tribe: Cranichideae
- Genus: Pterostylis
- Species: P. cycnocephala

Binomial name
- Pterostylis cycnocephala Fitzg.

Synonyms
- Pterostylis mutica R.Br.; Oligochaetochilus cycnocephalus (Fitzg.) Szlach.; Hymenochilus cycnocephalus (Fitzg.) D.L.Jones & M.A.Clem.

= Pterostylis cycnocephala =

Swan greenhood

Species of orchid

Pterostylis cycnocephala, commonly known as the swan greenhood, is a plant in the orchid family Orchidaceae and is endemic to south-eastern Australia. It has a rosette of leaves and up to 24 green flowers which have a labellum with a dark green, beak-like appendage. It is widespread and common from the Darling Downs in Queensland to Tasmania, usually growing with grasses.

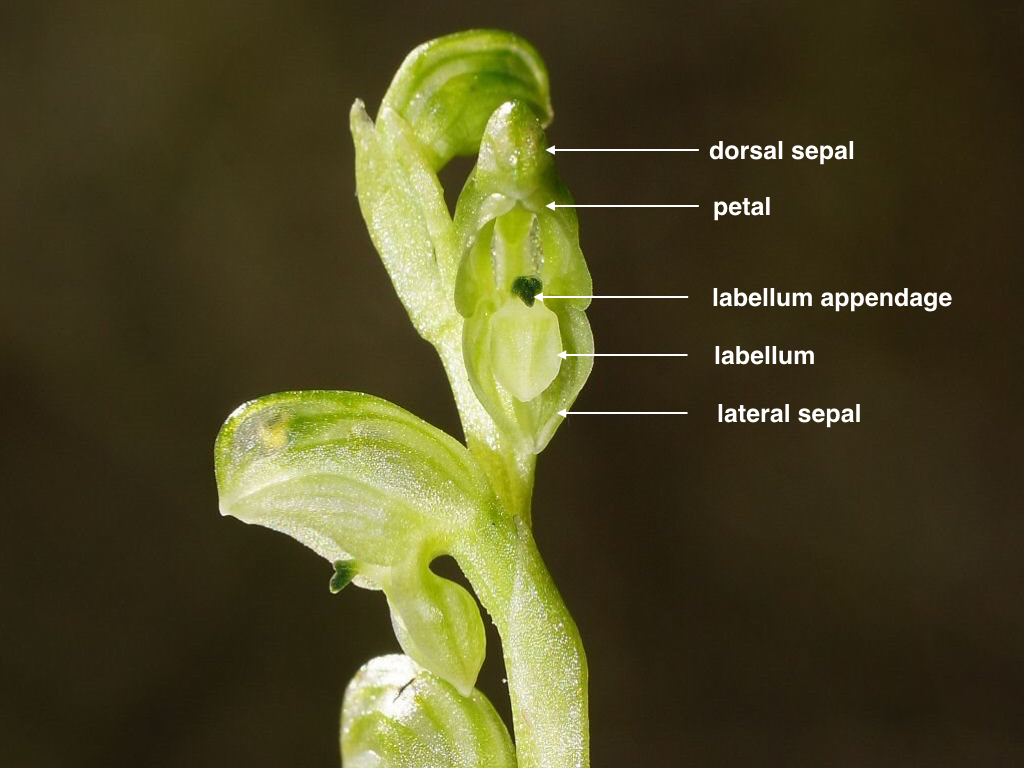
Labelled image of P. cycnocephala

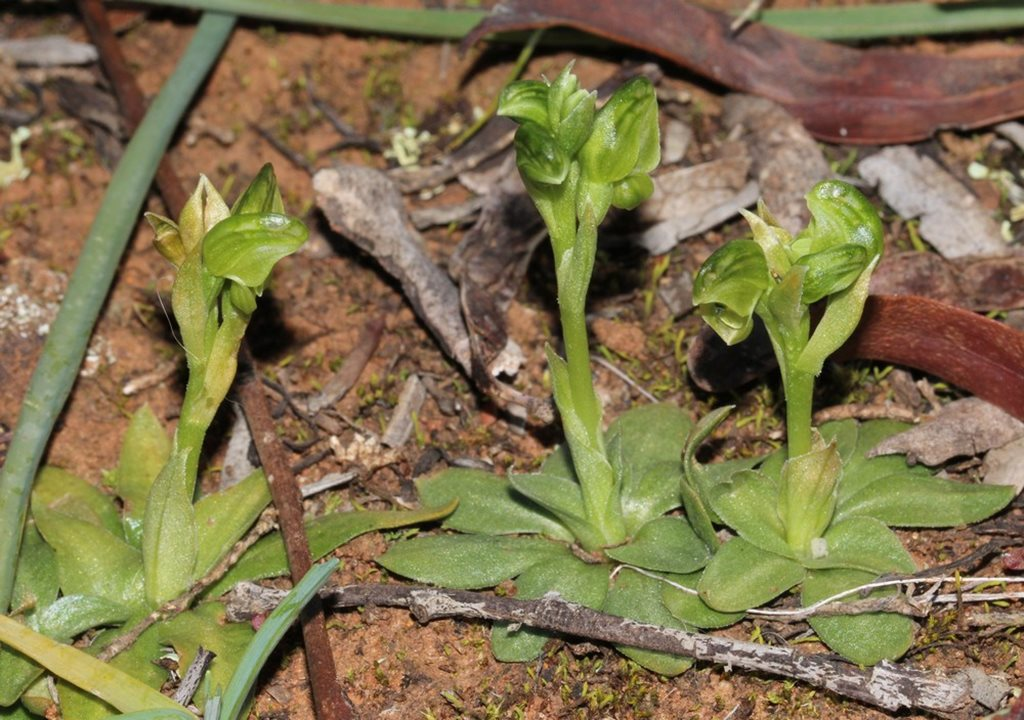
Whole plant of P. cycnocephala

== Description ==
Pterostylis cycnocephala, is a terrestrial, perennial, deciduous, herb with an underground tuber. It has a rosette of between six and twelve dark green leaves at the base of the flowering spike, each leaf 12–35 mm (0.5–1 in) long and 8–15 mm (0.3–0.6 in) wide. Up to 24 shiny green flowers 7–9 mm (0.3–0.4 in) long and about 4 mm (0.2 in) wide are borne on a flowering spike 80–300 mm (3–10 in) tall. Three to six stem leaves are wrapped around the flowering spike. The dorsal sepal and petals form a hood or "galea" over the column. The dorsal sepal is blunt and curved downwards with the sides turned down. The lateral sepals turn downwards, about 6 mm (0.2 in) long and 5 mm (0.2 in) wide, dished and joined for most of their length. The labellum is rectangular in shape, about 2 mm (0.08 in) long and whitish-green with a dark green, beak-like appendage pointing forward at its base. Flowering occurs from August to December.

== Taxonomy and naming ==
Pterostylis cycnocephala was first formally described in 1936 by Robert FitzGerald and the description was published in Fitzgerald's book, Australian Orchids. The specific epithet (cycnocephala) is derived from the Ancient Greek words kyknos meaning "swan" and kephale meaning "head", referring to the labellum appendage having the shape of a swan's head and neck.

== Distribution and habitat ==
The swan greenhood is common and widespread from the Darling Downs in Queensland, through New South Wales, Victoria, South Australia to Tasmania, growing mostly in grassy places.
