= Railway Construction Act 1884 =

Parliament of Victoria
- Long title: An Act to authorize the Construction of certain Lines of Railway by the State and for other purposes.
- Citation: 48 Vict. No. 821
- Royal assent: 12 December 1884

The Victorian Government's Railway Construction Act 1884 (No. 821), authorised the construction of 59 new railway lines in the colony, plus additional infrastructure.

Promoted by the Minister for Railways, Thomas Bent, and passed on 12 December 1884, it became notorious for the large number of railway lines it authorised, and was dubbed the "Octopus Act". It was accompanied by the Victorian Railway Loan and Debentures Redemption Act 1883 (No. 760), which permitted the raising of a loan of £600,000 for construction of the various lines.

The act, "to authorize the Construction of certain Lines of Railway by the State and for other purposes", listed 51 "country lines", eight "suburban lines", four short connections and bridges, and two "railway[s] or sidings", specifying 65 pieces of new infrastructure in total. It also provided for additional platforms, buildings, sidings, road approaches, drains, bridge widenings and modifications to existing infrastructure as necessary. It allowed for an average expenditure of £3,960 per mile for the country lines, and £14,294 per mile for the suburban lines.

The severe economic depression in the 1890s soon highlighted the fact that many of the lines were not viable.

== Scheduled lines ==
=== Country lines ===
1. Avoca and Ararat Railway
2. Bacchus Marsh and Gordons Railway
3. Bacchus Marsh Junction and New-port Railway
4. Ballarat East and Buninyong Railway
5. Ballarat Cattle Yards Branch Railway
6. Ballarat Eacecourse and Springs Railway
7. Birregurra and Cape Otway Forest Railway
8. Camperdown and Curdie's River Railway
9. Camperdown to Terand and Warrnambool Railway
10. Coburg and Somerton Railway
11. Creswick and Daylesford Railway
12. Dandenong and Leongatha Railway
13. Dimboola and South Australian Border Railway
14. Fitzroy and Whittlesea Railway
15. Frankston and Crib Point Railway 15A: Mornington Railway
16. Frankston Cemetery Railway
17. Hamilton and Coleraine Railway
18. Heyfield and Bairns-dale Railway,
19. Horsham and Natimuk Railway
20. Inglewood and Dunolly Railway 20A. Kerang to Swan Hill
21. Koroit and Belfast Railway
22. Koroit Railway via Penshurst 22A. Hamilton and Penshurst Railway
23. Koroit and Warrnambool Railway
24. Kyneton and Redesdale Railway
25. Lancefield and Kilmore Railway
26. Leongatha and Port Albert Railway
27. Lilydale and Healesville Railway (via Yarra Flats)
28. Lubeck and Rupanyup Railway
29. Maffra and Briagolong Railway
30. Maldon and Laanecoorie Railway
31. Moe and Narracan Railway
32. Mount Moriac and Forest Railway
33. Murchison and Rushworth Rail-way
34. Murtoa and Warracknabeal Railway
35. Myrtleford and Bright Railway
36. Numurkah and Cobram Railway
37. Numurkah and Nathalia Railway
38. Ondit and Beeac Railway
39. Ringwood and Ferntree Gully Railway
40. Sale and Stratford Railway
41. Scarsdale and Lintons Railway
42. Shepparton and Dookie Railway
43. St. James and Yarrawonga RAilway
44. Tatura and Echuca Railway
45. Terang and Mortlake Railway
46. Wandong Heathcote and Sandhurst Railway
47. Warragul and Neerim Railway
48. Wedderburn Road and Wedderburn Railway
49. Wodonga and Tallangatta Railway
50. Yackandandah and Beechworth Railway
51. Yea and Mansfield Railway; Alexandra Branch Railway

=== Suburban lines ===
Schedule numbers are as given.

- 52. Alphington and Heidelberg Railway
- 53. Brighton and Picnic Point Railway
- 54. Burnley to Junction with Outer Circle Railway
- 55. Fitzroy Branch Railway
- 56. Hawthorn and Kew Railway
- 57. Lal Lal Racecourse Railway
- 58. Outer Circle Railway, Oakleigh, via Camberwell to Richmond and Alphington Railway
- 59. Royal Park and Clifton Hill Railway

=== Additional infrastructure ===
Schedule numbers are as given, with authorised expenditure from Section 7 where given.

- 60. Murray-bridge (temporary) (£1,750)
- 61. Portland Pier
- 62. Murray-bridge (£25,000)
- 63. Flinders-street Viaduct (£73,000)
- 64. Windsor Siding
- 65. Ballarat siding

Section 4 provided for "Additional sidings etc. on existing lines".

Section 7 also authorised expenditure on the following works:

- 66. Duplication Hawthorn and Camberwell Line (£8,500)
- 67. Railway works (£800,000)
- Rolling-stock (£178,000) and permanent-way (£415,000)

== Implementation ==
The task of implementing the act fell to Richard Speight, chief railway commissioner at the time, a role created by the Victorian Railways Commissioners Act 1883 (No. 767).

Beneficiaries of the act included construction engineers such as Andrew O'Keefe and David Munro, and politicians, including Thomas Bent himself, who reaped the rewards of promoting or commissioning railway construction in their electorates.

Construction of the lines was complete by April 1890.

By 1892, amid the background of a worsening economic depression, outrage at the excesses of the construction boom, including a number of "white elephants", led to the sacking of Speight, as well as the other commissioners, Richard Ford and A. J. Agg. The Railways Act 1892 attempted to reverse some of the damage.

== See also ==
- Rail transport in Victoria

== Sources ==
- "Victorian Parliamentary Chronology: 150 Years of Parliament in Victoria - the 1880s". Archived from the original on 9 July 2009.
