= Heathcote railway line =

Railway line in Australia

Heathcote Railway Line

Overview
- Termini: Bendigo; Heathcote Junction

History
- Opened: August 1890
- Closed: 3 December 1958: (Rangelea - Heathcote) 7 November 1968: (Heathcote - Heathcote Junction) 29 May 1990: (Rangelea - North Bendigo Junction)

Technical
- Line length: 111.5 km (69.3 mi)
- Track gauge: 1,600 mm (5 ft 3 in)

The Heathcote railway line was a cross-country link between Bendigo and Heathcote Junction. It was partly opened in 1888 and, by 1890, it was fully operational. It was partially closed in 1958 and fully closed in 1968.

In 1975, it was decided to dismantle the track and, today, only some trestle bridges remain.

== History ==
The line was authorised by the Victorian Parliament in 1881, and construction began in 1888. The first section, between Heathcote and Bendigo opened in October 1888, and the entire line became operational in August 1890. Including 50 bridges, the line took 21 months to complete, at a cost of 88,409 pounds, with two derailments during the process.

== Stations ==
The line had the following stations:

- Kilmore Junction - now Heathcote Junction
- Leslie
- Bylands
- Kilmore
- Willowmavin
- Moranding
- High Camp
- Pyalong
- Tooborac
- McIvor siding
- Argyle
- Heathcote
- Derrinal
- Knowsley
- Axedale
- Longlea (previously Axe Creek)
- Strathfieldsaye (closed 1911)
- Bendigo

== Today ==
The original line may have been ripped up, but there are few instances where the original track still remains. It now makes up the O'Keefe Rail Trail
