= Lake Eppalock =

Dam and reservoir in Victoria, Australia

Eppalock Dam
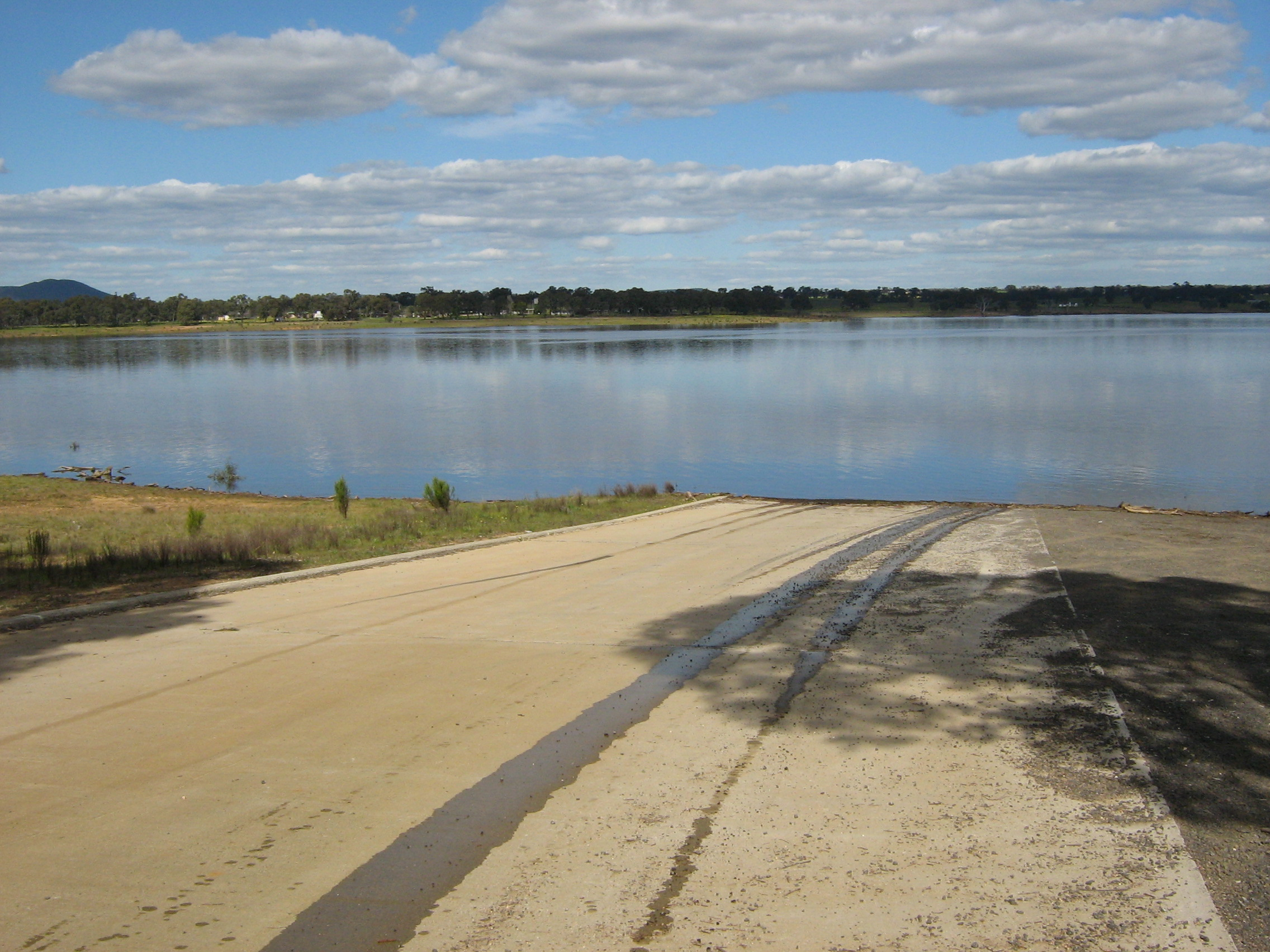
- The reservoir, in 2010

- Location of the dam in Victoria
- Interactive map of Eppalock Dam
- Country: Australia
- Location: Eppalock, Victoria
- Coordinates: 36°51′02″S 144°31′55″E
- Purpose: Water supply, irrigation
- Status: Operational
- Construction began: 1960
- Opening date: 1964
- Owner: Goulburn–Murray Water

Dam and spillways
- Type of dam: Embankment dam
- Impounds: Campaspe River; Coliban River
- Height (foundation): 47 metres (154 ft)
- Length: 400 m (1,300 ft)
- Dam volume: 14,170×10^{3} m^{3} (500×10^{6} cu ft)
- Spillways: 3
- Spillway type: Controlled chute
- Spillway capacity: 8,040 m^{3}/s (284,000 cu ft/s)

Reservoir
- Creates: Lake Eppalock
- Total capacity: 304,651 ML (246,985 acre⋅ft)
- Catchment area: 2,124 km^{2} (820 sq mi)
- Surface area: 3,011 ha (7,440 acres)
- Maximum water depth: 30 m (98 ft)
- Normal elevation: 193.8 m (636 ft) AHD
- Website www.g-mwater.com.au/lakeeppalock

Lake Eppalock is a water supply reservoir formed as a result of the Eppalock Dam, an embankment dam across the Campaspe and the Coliban rivers, located in Eppalock, North Central Victoria, Australia, approximately 130 kilometres (81 mi) northwest of Melbourne. Completed in 1964, the dam's reservoir supplies potable water for the regional population centres of Ballarat, Bendigo and Heathcote, irrigation for the Campaspe district, and is also used for recreational purposes. The dam and reservoir is operated by Goulburn–Murray Water.

== Dam and reservoir overview ==
=== Dam ===
The dam was built between 1960 and 1964 by the State Rivers and Water Supply Commission of Victoria. The earth and rock-filled dam wall is 45 metres (148 ft) high and 1,041 metres (3,415 ft) long. When full, the reservoir can hold 304,651 megalitres (246,985 acre⋅ft) that covers 3,011 hectares (7,440 acres) drawn from a catchment area of 2,124 square kilometres (820 sq mi). The controlled chute spillway is capable of discharging 8,040 cubic metres per second (284,000 cu ft/s).

=== Reservoir ===
Lake Eppalock supplies both stock and domestic water to the Campaspe irrigation district. It also serves as a water supply to Bendigo and Heathcote and, in more recent times, Ballarat.

The lake is a major attraction for those engaging in watersports, with a number of tourist parks and accommodation facilities available. Permissible activities on the lake include high-speed boating, water skiing, sailing, canoeing, fishing and swimming. The lake's water levels were low for approximately eight years between 2002 and 2010 during a prolonged drought, which restricted the amount of recreational activity until rainfall in the latter half of 2010 returned the lake to 100 percent capacity. A speed restriction of 5 knots is placed on the lake when the level falls below 16 percent or 180 metres (590 ft) AHD.

Camping is permitted only in caravan parks and/or on private land surrounding the lake with a permit from the land owner.

Lake Eppalock is the only water storage on the Campaspe River system. The lake was full in August 2000 then ran dry over two years, to 2002. It remained below 15 percent for eight years due to drought. The reservoir rose from 8 percent in June 2010, to full capacity by November. The lake overflowed its spillway for the first time since 1996, on 28 November 2010, after significant rainfall over the preceding 48 hours. As of August 2015, the lake was at 44% capacity, down from 74% a year earlier.

== Gallery ==
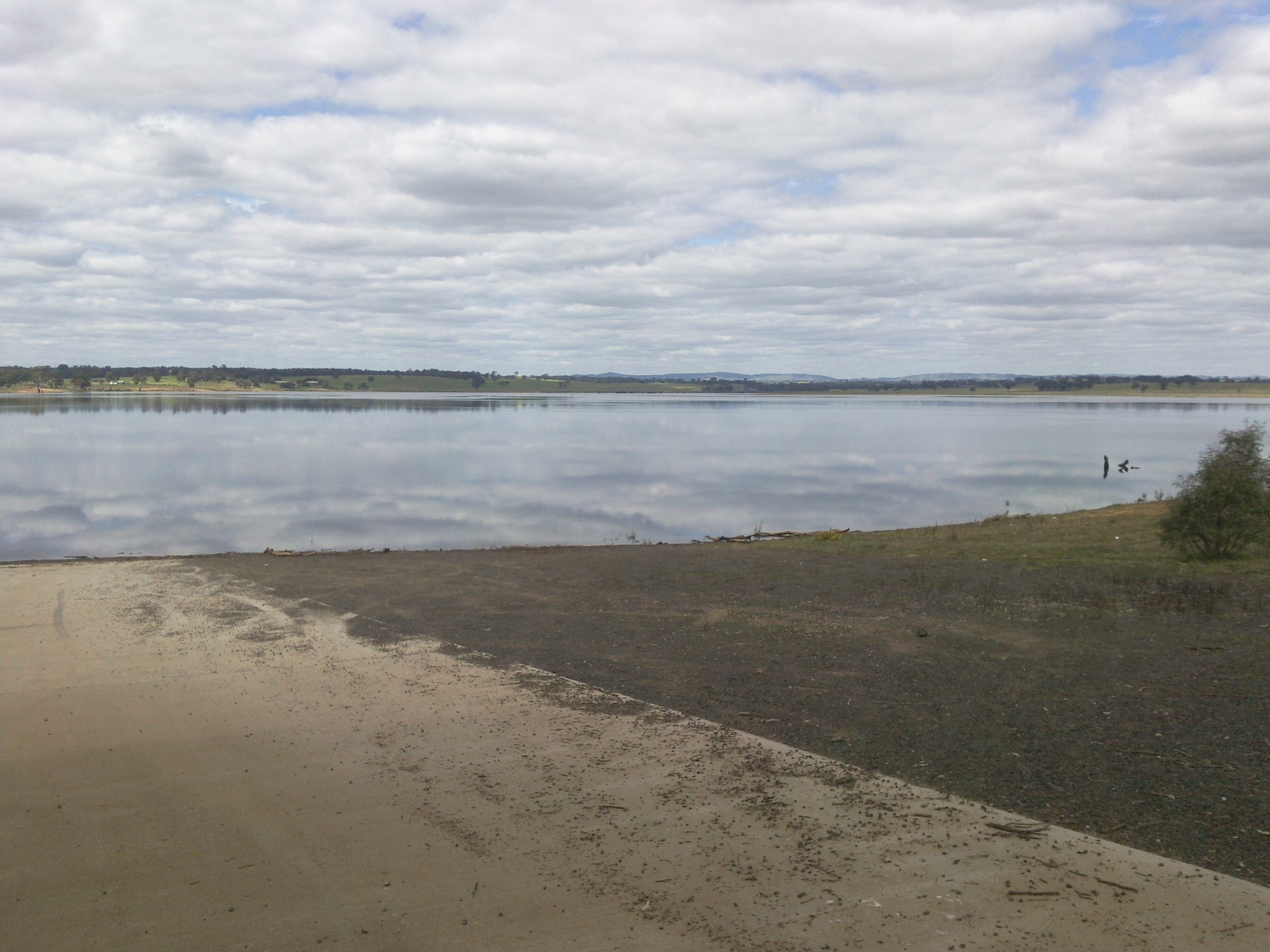
Derrinal Pool, in October 2010

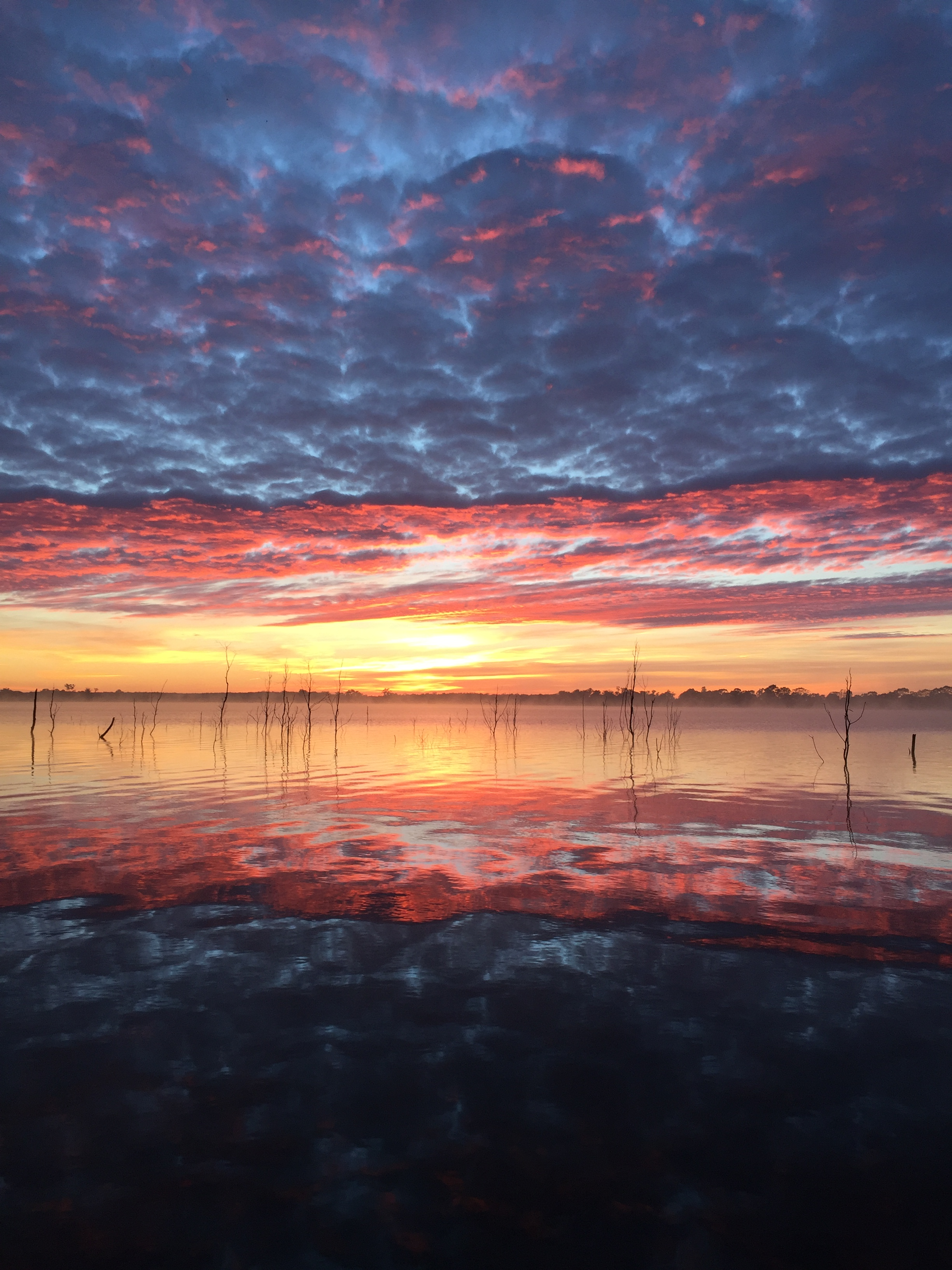
Sunrise over Lake Eppalock

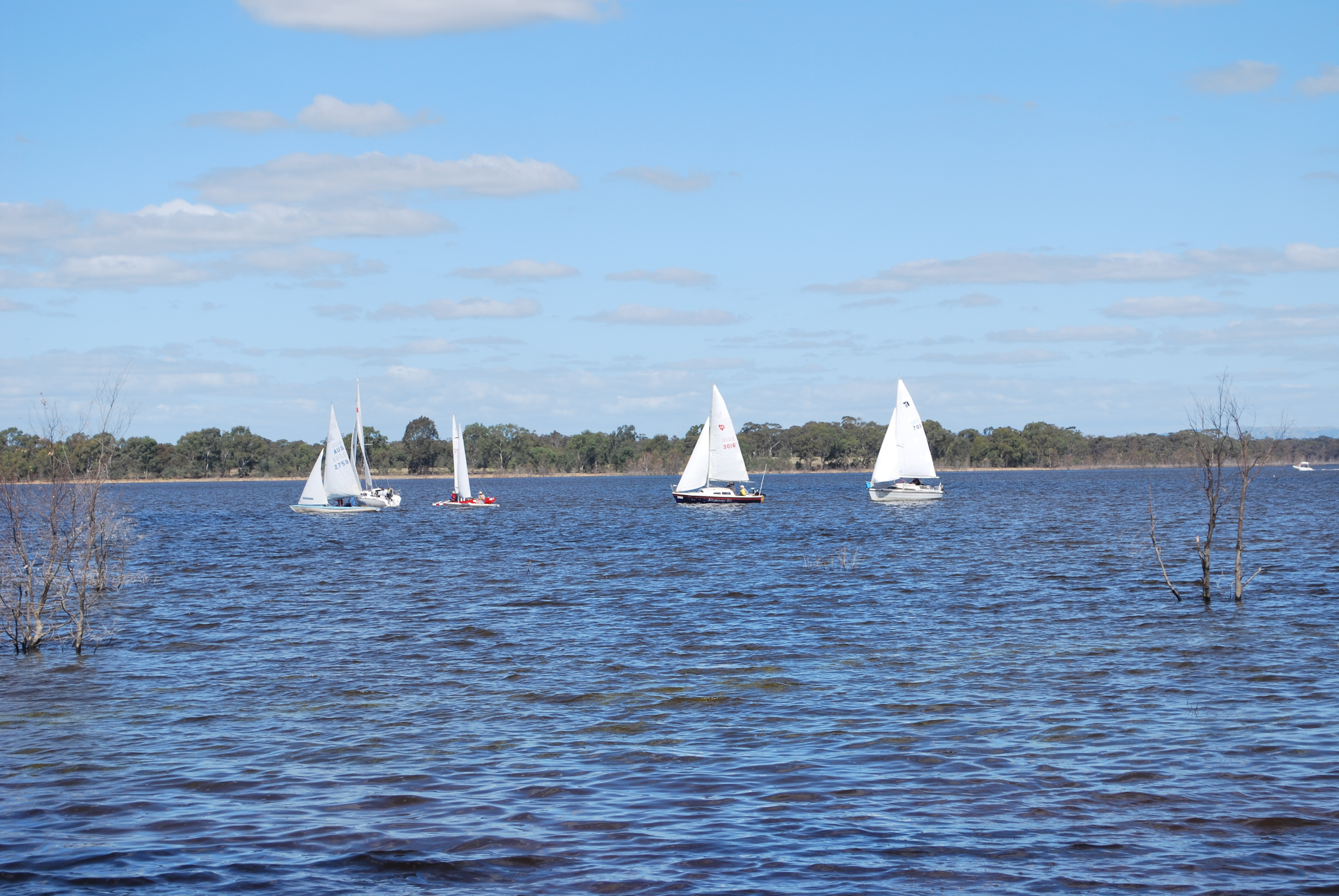
Sailing on Lake Eppalock

== See also ==
- List of reservoirs and dams in Victoria
- Lakes and other water bodies of Victoria
