= Campaspe River =

Campaspe
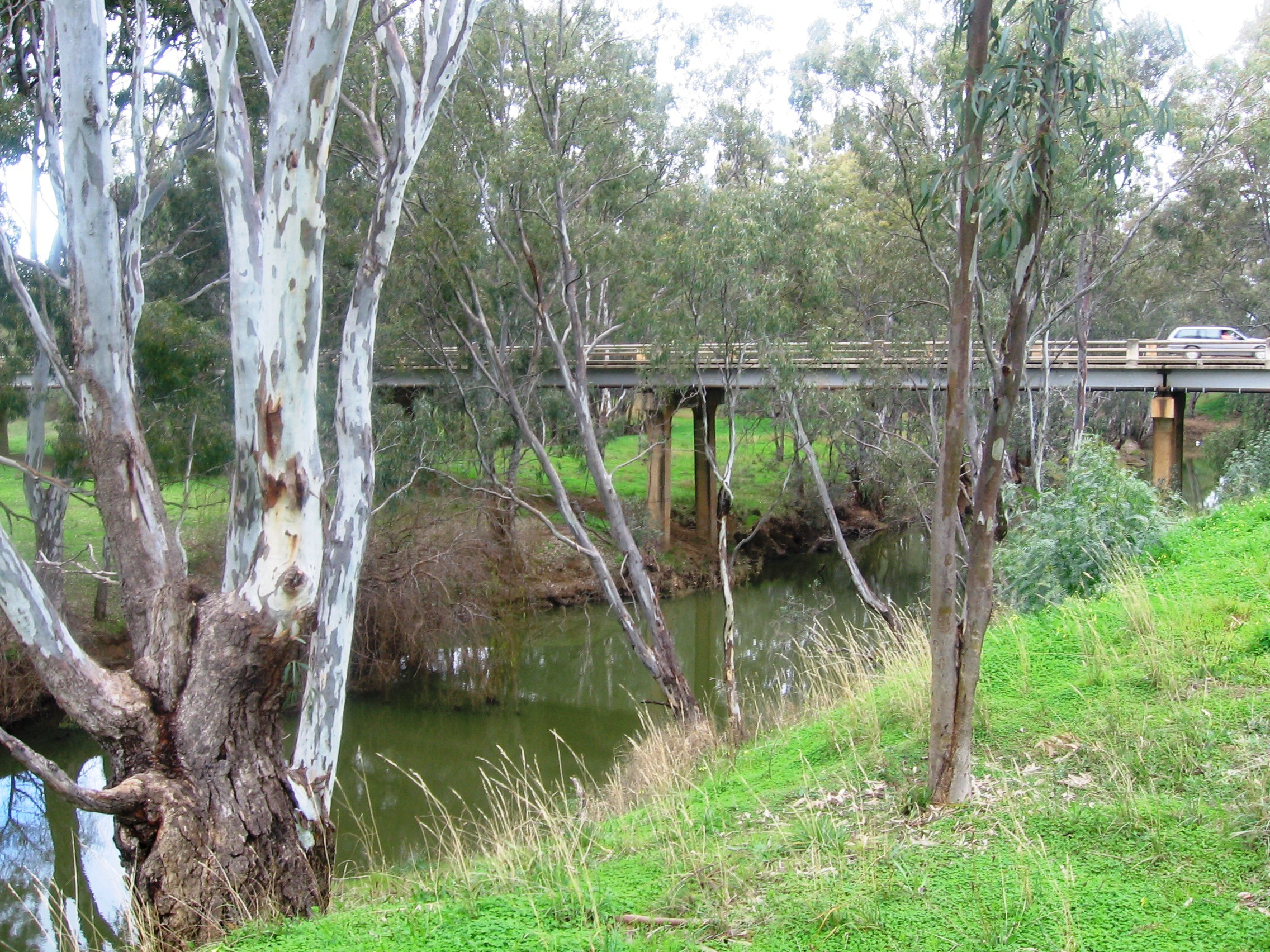
- Campaspe River at Elmore

- Course of the Campaspe River in Victoria
- Etymology: Campaspe, a mistress of Alexander the Great.
- Native name: Yalka, Yalooka, Boregam, Yerrin (undetermined)

Location
- Country: Australia
- State: Victoria
- Region: Riverina bioregion (IBRA), Central Highlands, Wimmera
- Local government areas: Greater Bendigo City, Campaspe
- Towns: Kyneton, Redesdale, Elmore, Rochester, Echuca

Physical characteristics
- Source: Great Dividing Range
  - location: Wombat State Forest near Bullengarook
  - coordinates: 37°25′13″S 144°28′38″E
  - elevation: 679 m (2,228 ft)
- Mouth: confluence with the Murray River
  - location: Echuca
  - coordinates: 36°7′5″S 144°43′36″E
  - elevation: 98 m (322 ft)
- Length: 232 km (144 mi)
- Basin size: 4,179 km^{2} (1,614 sq mi)
- Discharge
  - location: Echuca
  - average: 7 m^{3}/s (250 cu ft/s)

Basin features
- River system: Murray–Darling basin
- Tributaries
  - left: Coliban River, Mosquito Creek (Campaspe River), Axe Creek
  - right: Pipers Creek (Campaspe River), Stone Jug Creek, Forest Creek (Campaspe River), Mount Pleasant Creek

The Campaspe River, an inland intermittent river of the north–central catchment, part of the Murray–Darling basin, is located in the lower Riverina bioregion and Central Highlands and Wimmera regions of the Australian state of Victoria. The headwaters of the Campaspe River rise on the northern slopes of the Great Dividing Range and descend to flow north into the Murray River, Australia's longest river, near Echuca.

== Location and features ==
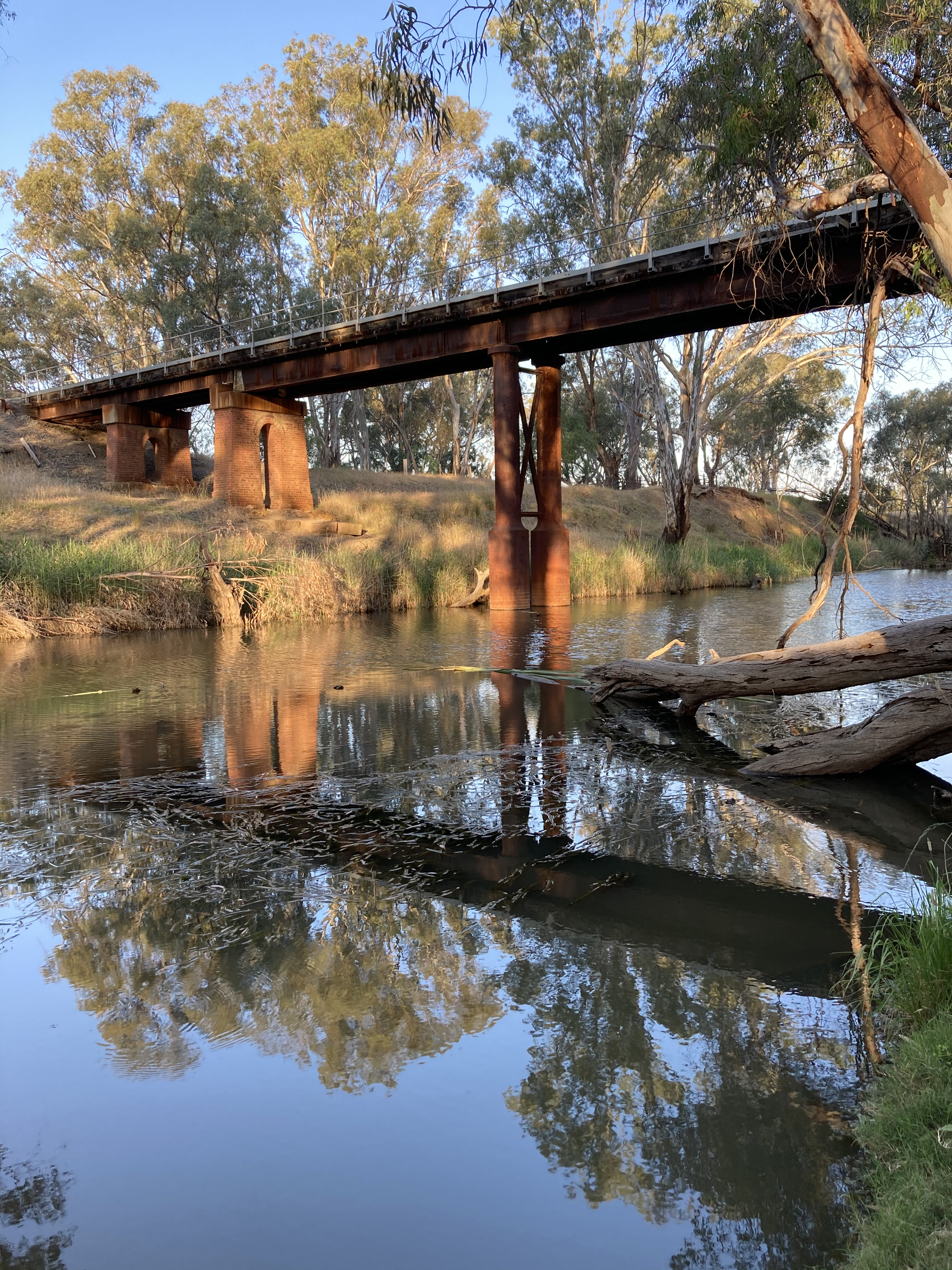
Red Bridge, a railway bridge over the river at Rochester

From its source in the foothills of the Great Dividing Range below Red Hill, the Campaspe River rises in the Wombat State Forest northwest of Bullengarook and southwest of Macedon, near Ashbourne and Firth Park, a local camping ground and historical area. The river then flows west of the township of Woodend and continues north through the town of Kyneton. The middle reaches of the river are dominated by Lake Eppalock, a constructed reservoir. The Coliban River, the most significant tributary of the Campaspe, also flows into Lake Eppalock. Towns located on the river in this area include Redesdale located just south of Eppalock and Axedale, located just below Eppalock. The towns of Elmore and Rochester lie on the river's lower reaches. The river meets its confluence with the Murray River west of the town of Echuca, located adjacent to the state border between Victoria and New South Wales.

In addition to the Coliban River, the Campaspe River is joined by six minor tributaries and passes through the Campaspe Weir. The river descends 581 metres (1,906 ft) over its 232-kilometre (144 mi) course.

The river is crossed three times by the Calder Highway near Kyneton, and by the McIvor Highway near Eppalock. The Midland Highway and Northern Highway duplex crosses the river at Elmore, and the Murray Valley Highway and Northern Highway duplex crosses the river at Echuca.

== Etymology ==
As the river is relatively long, Aboriginal peoples from various cultural groups lived near the river course. In the Yorta Yorta language, the name for the river is Yalka or Yalooka, meaning "dry leaf". In the Taungurung language the name for the river is Boregam, with no clearly defined meaning. In the Taungurung and Ngurai-illam Wurrung language, the river is named Yerrin, with no clearly defined meaning.

It was named by Major Mitchell in 1836 for Campaspe, a mistress of Alexander the Great.

== See also ==
- List of rivers of Australia § Victoria
