= Lockington Bamawm United Football Club =

Names
- Full name: Lockington Bamawm United Football & Netball Club
- Nickname: Cats

2017 season
- After finals: DNQ
- Home-and-away season: 6th

Club details
- Founded: 1990; 35 years ago
- Colours: White Navy blue
- Competition: HDFL
- Premierships: HDFL (4) 2011, 2012, 2013, 2014
- Ground: Nichol Trading Oval, Lockington

Other information
- Official website: LBUFNC

The Lockington Bamawm United Football Club is an Australian Rules Football club which competes in the Heathcote District Football League.

The club, known as the Lockington Bamawm United Cats, is based in Lockington & Bamawm, Victoria and has participated in the HDFL since 2001.

The Cats have appeared in six grand finals since 2001, winning four.

== Location ==
Shire of Campaspe (Lockington)
Shire of Campaspe (Bamawm)
Lockington Bamawm (Victoria)

== History ==
In 1990, the Northern Districts Football League merged with the Echuca Football League to form the Northern and Echuca Football League. Lockington and Bamawm, two clubs with a long-standing association with the Echuca league, decided to merge and compete in the new competition. The league operated for seven seasons before disbanding. During this period, the club reached the Grand Final twice but was defeated on both occasions.

In 1997, the club joined the Bendigo Football League. LBU made the finals in its first year; however, the following two seasons were challenging, producing only one victory. Across its four-year tenure in the Bendigo Football League, the club accumulated a total of 15 wins.

=== Successful Years (2011–2014) ===
Lockington Bamawm United has been a very successful club since its time began in 2001 making history in the HDFL. In 2002, one season after joining the HDFL, they finished runners-up losing to Colbinabbin 15.10 (100) – 11.9 (75). Eight seasons later, in 2010 they were back in the Grand final. This time they were runners-up against Heathcote losing 8.8 (56) – 5.9 (39). The 2011 season came around and they finished minor premiers, giving much hope for the finals. they beat Elmore in the second Semi-final and were playing Heathcote again in the Grand final, for the second time in a row. This time, however finishing premiers for the clubs first time winning by a single goal, the scoreline read 15.9 (99) – 14.9 (93). In 2012 LBU were well and truly favourites for the flag come finals time. they finished minor premiers for just a second time and were en route to the Grand final. They beat 2010 premiers and 2011 runners-up Heathcote in the second Semi-final and played an unexpected North Bendigo in the Grand final winning by almost one hundred points and scoring the fourth-largest margin in HDFL finals history, beating North Bendigo by 94 points, the scoreline was 21.14 (140) – 7.4 (46).

In 2013 there was no doubt LBU were favourites or the flag. And when they finished the 2013 season as minor premiers. Their only loss came to Huntly in round 3, losing by three goals (18 points). They played Huntly a total of four times during 2013 losing once in round 3. When the Grand final came around LBU were on a fourteen-game winning streak and did not look like they would be losing any time soon. They played Huntly for the premiership and beat them by 58 points, 15.13 (103) – 6.9 (45) and taking their third consecutive flag.

By 2014 LBU had established themselves as regular contenders for the premiership, after playing four season in the HDFL and winning the last two premierships with a combined margin of 152, as well as playing 64 games and winning 55 this gave LBU a win ratio of 85.93%. However, their reign was coming to an end. They finished the regular season in second position after North Bendigo, losing just three games twice to North Bendigo and once to White Hills. LBU lost the Qualifying final to Leitchville Gunbower by a goal 16.17 (113) – 15.17 (107), making them play the 1st semi-final beating Mount Pleasant by 33 points and succeeding to the preliminary final against Leitchville Gunbower beating them by 31 points and making it a fifth Grand final appearance in as many years and their sixth overall since 2001, going into the Grand Final LBU were the underdog, but after their fifth appearance in the grand final in five years they were the more experienced team. North Bendigo played LBU in the 2012 grand final and lost by 94 points, the fourth largest margin in the HDFL finals. At quarter-time the game was neck and neck, North Bendigo leading 3.4 (22) – 3.3 (21). At half-time North Bendigo was gaining a bigger margin leading 8.7 (55) – 5.4 (34). In the third quarter LBU had shortened the lead but were still losing 8.6 (54) – 10.8 (68), however, in the final quarter of the match LBU had kicked five goals to North Bendigo's one and won their fourth consecutive flag by 11 points.

=== Rebuild (2015–present) ===
In 2015 LBU finished second last on the ladder having won just two of the sixteen games that season and had failed to make the finals after five very successful past seasons. In 2016 LBU finished as wooden spooners winning just one game. However, 2017 was a much brighter season. LBU won four of sixteen games and missed finals by just three games.

== Rivalries ==
Because the club has only been in the league since 2001 and it is a small country, rural league there are not many big rivalries however LBU's biggest rivals are Leitchville Gunbower, North Bendigo, Heathcote & Elmore.

== Honours ==
HDFL

Premierships & Grand Finals

Year	Winner	Runner-up	Score
2011	Lockington Bamawm United	Heathcote	99 – 93
2012	Lockington Bamawm United	North Bendigo	140 – 46
2013	Lockington Bamawm United	Huntly	103 – 45
2014	Lockington Bamawm United	North Bendigo	87 – 76

== Books ==
- History of Football in the Bendigo District – John Stoward – ISBN 978-0-9805929-1-7
