= Heathcote District Football League =

Australian rules football league

- Formerly: Heathcote District Football Association
- Association: AFL Victoria Country
- Sport: Australian rules football
- Founded: 1905
- No. of teams: 9
- Headquarters: Bendigo, Victoria, Australia
- Most recent champion: North Bendigo (2026)
- Most premierships: Mount Pleasant (21)
- Level on pyramid: 2
- Website: websites.sportstg.com/assoc_page.cgi?assoc=6168

The Heathcote District Football League (HDFL) is an Australian rules football competition based in the Heathcote region and major Bendigo area with clubs based in the regions of City of Greater Bendigo, Shire of Campaspe, and Shire of Gannawarra

== History ==
The Heathcote District Football League became a league in 1955. Previous names for the competitions in the area were the Heathcote District Football Association (1905), McIvor District Football Association (1906) and again the Heathcote District Football Association (1907–1954).

The Heathcote and District Football League has become a competitive league within the context of the minor football leagues of Victoria in recent years. The performance of this league in the Victoria Country Championships, known as Interleague, includes winning against the Central Murray Football League, and even the ranking of this league is above the North Central Football League. This success is quite impressive for a small league consisting of only nine teams.

Over the past few years the HDFL has beaten the Geelong & District & Horsham & District Leagues but fell short to AFL Barwon league, Bellarine in 2016.

The HDFL has had many representatives playing for Victoria Country, including recent players Grant Weeks, Andy Grant, Hadleigh Sirett & Jye Keath.

== Clubs ==
=== Locations ===
Locations of the Heathcote & District FNL clubs

=== Current clubs ===
Club	Colours	Moniker	Home Ground	Former	Est.	Years in HDFNL	HDFNL Senior Premierships	
Club	Colours	Moniker	Home Ground	Former	Est.	Years in HDFNL	Total	Years
Colbinabbin		Grasshoppers	MJ Morgan Reserve, Colbinabbin	CVFA	1915	1935-	12	1939, 1949, 1950, 1975, 1978, 1991, 1998, 1999, 2002, 2003, 2004, 2008
Elmore		Bloods	Elmore Recreation Reserve, Elmore	EFL	1882	1938-1939, 1948-	5	1954, 1960, 1963, 1985, 2007
Heathcote		Saints	Barrack Reserve, Heathcote	–	1967	1967-	7	1970, 1972, 1982, 1989, 1992, 2009, 2010
Huntly (Provincial-Huntly 1986)		Hawks	Strauch Reserve, Huntly	–	1986	1986-	0	–
Leitchville Gunbower		Bombers	Leitchville Recreation Reserve, Leitchville and Gunbower Recreation Reserve, Gunbower	CMFNL	1995	2010-	2	2017, 2018
Lockington Bamawm United		Cats	Lockington Recreation Reserve, Lockington	BFNL	1990	2001-	5	2011, 2012, 2013, 2014, 2022
Mount Pleasant		Blues	Toolleen Recreation Reserve, Toolleen	CVFA	1889	1935-	21	1962, 1966, 1967, 1968, 1971, 1979, 1980, 1981, 1983, 1984, 1990, 1993, 1994, 1995, 1997, 2000, 2001, 2005, 2006, 2023, 2025
North Bendigo		Bulldogs	North Bendigo Recreation Reserve, North Bendigo	BFNL	1945	1996-	4	2015, 2016, 2019, 2026
White Hills		Demons	White Hills Recreation Reserve, White Hills	BFNL	1924	1984-	2	1988, 2024

=== Former clubs ===
Club	Colours	Moniker	Home Ground	Former	Est.	Years in HDFNL	HDFNL Senior Premierships		Fate
Club	Colours	Moniker	Home Ground	Former	Est.	Years in HDFNL	Total	Years	Fate
Aloysians				–	c.1900s	1912	0	-	Folded
Axedale				–	1921	1921, 1928-1932	0	-	Moved to Golden City FL
Broadford		Kangaroos	Harley Hammond Reserve, Broadford	RDFNL	1890	1985-2008	1	1996	Returned to Riddell District FNL in 2009
Costerfield				–	1900	1905-1947	8	1912, 1913, 1914, 1919, 1920, 1923, 1924, 1926	Folded
Emu Flat				–	c.1900s	1906	0	-	Folded
Eppalock Weir				–	c.1920s	1928	0	-	Folded
Goornong			Goornong Recreation Reserve, Goornong	GCFL	c.1910s	1947-1951	0	-	Folded
Heathcote			Barrack Reserve, Heathcote	–	c.1900s	1905-1921	2	1918, 1921	Split to form Heathcote North and Heathcote South in 1922
Heathcote Blues		Blues	Barrack Reserve, Heathcote	–	1924	1924-1926	0	-	Replaced by Heathcote North and Heathcote Rovers in 1927
Heathcote Centrals			Barrack Reserve, Heathcote	–	c.1900s	1907	0	-	Folded
Heathcote Dons		Dons	Barrack Reserve, Heathcote	–	1934	1934	1	1934	Replaced by Heathcote North and Heathcote Rovers in 1935
Heathcote McIvors		McIvors	Barrack Reserve, Heathcote	–	1934	1934	0	-	Replaced by Heathcote North and Heathcote Rovers in 1935
Heathcote North		Bombers	Barrack Reserve, Heathcote	–	1922	1922-1924, 1928-1933, 1935-1966	8	1922, 1952, 1955, 1956, 1957, 1958, 1959, 1964	Replaced by Blues, Ramblers and Reds in 1925. Replaced by Dons, McIvors and Ramblers in 1934. Merged with Heathcote Rovers to form Heathcote in 1967
Heathcote Ramblers		Ramblers	Barrack Reserve, Heathcote	–	1924	1924, 1934	0	-	Folded after 1924 season. Replaced by Heathcote North and Heathcote Rovers in 1935
Heathcote Reds		Reds	Barrack Reserve, Heathcote	–	1924	1924-1926	0	-	Replaced by Heathcote North and Heathcote Rovers in 1927
Heathcote Rovers		Magpies	Barrack Reserve, Heathcote	–	1927	1927-1933, 1935-1966	9	1927, 1928, 1929, 1930, 1940, 1945, 1947, 1948, 1951	Replaced by Dons, McIvors and Ramblers in 1934. Merged with Heathcote North to form Heathcote in 1967
Heathcote South			Barrack Reserve, Heathcote	–	1922	1922-1924	0	-	Replaced by Blues, Ramblers and Reds in 1925.
Knowsley				–	c.1900s	1924-1927, 1946	1	1946	Folded
Moormbool				–	c.1910s	1918-1925	0	-	Folded
Provincial		Pros	Weeroona Oval, Bendigo	BFNL	1945	1983-1985	0	-	Merged with Huntly JFC to form Huntly-Provincial in 1986
Pyalong			Pyalong Recreation Reserve, Pyalong	–	c.1900s	1914	0	-	Folded
Redesdale			Agnes Mudford Reserve, Redesdale	BFA	c.1900s	1930-1932	0	-	Folded
Rushworth		Tigers	Rushworth Recreation Reserve, Rushworth	GVFL	1882	1965-1998	3	1965, 1969, 1977	Moved to Kyabram District FNL in 1999
Stanhope		Lions	Stanhope Recreation Reserve, Stanhope	GVFL	1920	1976-1994	3	1976, 1986, 1987	Moved to Kyabram District FNL in 1995
Tooborac		Cats	Tooborac Recreation Reserve, Tooborac	–	c.1900s	1905-1986	11	1931, 1932, 1933, 1935, 1936, 1937, 1938, 1953, 1961, 1973, 1974	Folded in 1987
Toolleen			Toolleen Recreation Reserve, Toolleen	CVFA	c.1900s	1919–1920, 1933–1934	0	-	Moved to Goornong FA in 1921. Folded after 1934 season

== List of Premierships ==
Senior Football

Season	Premiers	Runners-up	Score
1912	Costerfield (1)	Heathcote	9.9 (63) – 2.2 (14)
1913	Costerfield (2)	Heathcote	6.11 (47) – 3.7 (25)
1914	Costerfield (3)	Heathcote	2.10 (22) – 2.7 (19)
1915	Suspended during World War I		
1916	Suspended during World War I		
1917	Suspended during World War I		
1918	Heathcote (1)	Costerfield	6.7 (43) – 3.7 (25)
1919	Costerfield (4)	Heathcote	8.5 (53 – 4.5 (29)
1920	Costerfield (5)	Heathcote	3.9 (27) – 3.5 (23)
1921	Heathcote (2)	Tooborac	7.9 (51) – 5.9 (39)
1922	Heathcote North (1)	Heathcote South	6.10 (46) – 3.13 (31)
1923	Costerfield (6)	Heathcote South	6.10 (46) – 4.3 (27)
1924	Costerfield (7)	Heathcote Ramblers	6.5 (41) – 2.6 (18)
1925	Heathcote Reds (1)	Costerfield	9.6 (60) – 6.4 (40)
1926	Costerfield (8)	Knowsley	7.15 (57) – 5.7 (37)
1927	Heathcote Rovers (1)	Costerfield	7.9 (51) – 5.8 (38)
1928	Heathcote Rovers (2)	Heathcote North	17.19 (121) – 10.11 (71)
1929	Heathcote Rovers (3)	Tooborac	12.11 (83) – 12.5 (77)
1930	Heathcote Rovers (4)	Heathcote North	10.10 (70) – 6.7 (43)
1931	Tooborac (1)	Heathcote North	13.17 (95) – 10.14 (74)
1932	Tooborac (2)	Heathcote Rovers	16.20 (116) – 12.14 (86)
1933	Tooborac (3)	Heathcote North	6.5 (41) – 6.4 (40)
1934	Heathcote Dons (1)	Costerfield	15.13 (103) – 6.10 (46)
1935	Tooborac (4)	Heathcote North	6.17 (53) – 6.12 (48)
1936	Tooborac (5)	Colbinabbin	17.14 (116) – 6.14 (50)
1937	Tooborac (6)	Heathcote Rovers	12.12 (84) – 5.11 (41)
1938	Tooborac (7)	Mount Pleasant	13.12 (90) – 10.11 (71)
1939	Colbinabbin (1)	Mount Pleasant	13.16 (94) – 13.4 (82)
1940	Heathcote Rovers (5)	Mount Pleasant	11.11 (77) – 9.10 (64)
1941	Suspended during World War II		
1942	Suspended during World War II		
1943	Suspended during World War II		
1944	Suspended during World War II		
1945	Heathcote Rovers (6)	Heathcote North	
1946	Knowsley (1)	Heathcote North	
1947	Heathcote Rovers (7)	Heathcote North	
1948	Heathcote Rovers (8)	Heathcote North	10.16 (76) – 5.8 (38)
1949	Colbinabbin (2)	Heathcote North	11.11 (77) – 10.10 (70)
1950	Colbinabbin (3)	Tooborac	10.16 (76) – 6.12 (48)
1951	Heathcote Rovers (9)	Tooborac	9.9 (63) – 9.8 (62)
1952	Heathcote North (2)	Tooborac	12.10 (82) – 10.9 (69)
1953	Tooborac (8)	Heathcote North	9.10 (64) – 4.18 (42)
1954	Elmore (1)	Tooborac	15.9 (99) – 7.19 (61)
1955	Heathcote North (3)	Elmore	12.11 (83) – 9.8 (62)
1956	Heathcote North (4)	Mount Pleasant	16.7 (103) – 7.7 (49)
1957	Heathcote North (5)	Heathcote Rovers	6.16 (52) – 3.4 (22)
1958	Heathcote North (6)	Tooborac	15.9 (99) – 10.5 (65)
1959	Heathcote North (7)	Tooborac	13.5 (83) – 9.13 (67)
1960	Elmore (2)	Mount Pleasant	12.17 (89) – 9.12 (66)
1961	Tooborac (9)	Heathcote North	14.12 (96) – 11.16 (82)
1962	Mount Pleasant (1)	Heathcote Rovers	9.11 (65) – 6.7 (43)
1963	Elmore (3)	Tooborac	9.16 (70) – 7.11 (53)
1964	Heathcote North (8)	Elmore	9.11 (65) – 6.12 (48)
1965	Rushworth (1)	Mount Pleasant	13.14 (92) – 8.4 (52)
1966	Mount Pleasant (2)	Heathcote North	10.14 (74) – 9.8 (62)
1967	Mount Pleasant (3)	Heathcote	14.10 (94) – 10.11 (71)
1968	Mount Pleasant (4)	Rushworth	14.17 (101) – 12.17 (89)
1969	Rushworth (2)	Elmore	12.9 (81) – 10.14 (74)
1970	Heathcote (1)	Elmore	8.13 (61) – 9.6 (60)
1971	Mount Pleasant (5)	Heathcote	18.14 (122) – 9.14 (68)
1972	Heathcote (2)	Colbinabbin	17.15 (117) – 12.14 (86)
1973	Tooborac (10)	Rushworth	21.21 (147) – 8.7 (55)
1974	Tooborac (11)	Colbinabbin	19.26 (140) – 14.15 (99)
1975	Colbinabbin (4)	Rushworth	12.15 (87) – 10.13 (73)
1976	Stanhope (1)	Colbinabbin	14.13 (97) – 12.13 (85)
1977	Rushworth (3)	Colbinabbin	18.2 (110) – 14.17 (101)
1978	Colbinabbin (5)	Stanhope	20.12 (132) – 17.15 (117)
1979	Mount Pleasant (6)	Colbinabbin	17.10 (112) – 15.17 (107)
1980	Mount Pleasant (7)	Elmore	17.13 (115) – 11.18 (84)
1981	Mount Pleasant (8)	Colbinabbin	15.18 (108) – 15.10 (100)
1982	Heathcote (3)	Mount Pleasant	20.15 (135) – 10.16 (76)
1983	Mount Pleasant (9)	Stanhope	8.14 (62) – 6.8 (44)
1984	Mount Pleasant (10)	Elmore	21.23 (149) – 12.9 (81)
1985	Elmore (4)	Heathcote	14.17 (101) – 10.10 (70)
1986	Stanhope (2)	Broadford	22.8 (140) – 6.8 (44)
1987	Stanhope (3)	White Hills	23.20 (158) – 13.7 (85)
1988	White Hills (1)	Stanhope	12.14 (86) – 9.10 (64)
1989	Heathcote (4)	Stanhope	24.15 (159) – 9.7 (61)
1990	Mount Pleasant (11)	Heathcote	15.18 (108) – 12.12 (84)
1991	Colbinabbin (6)	Heathcote	15.11 (101) – 11.9 (75)
1992	Heathcote (5)	Mount Pleasant	16.8 (104) – 9.12 (64)
1993	Mount Pleasant (12)	Heathcote	15.10 (100) – 11.14 (80)
1994	Mount Pleasant (13)	Heathcote	13.13 (91) – 12.11 (83)
1995	Mount Pleasant (14)	Heathcote	11.16 (82) – 10.17 (77)
1996	Broadford (1)	Mount Pleasant	7.8 (50) – 6.9 (45)
1997	Mount Pleasant (15)	Elmore	13.8 (86) – 11.12 (78)
1998	Colbinabbin (7)	North Bendigo	11.19 (85) – 4.3 (27)
1999	Colbinabbin (8)	Mount Pleasant	7.8 (50) – 4.6 (30)
2000	Mount Pleasant (16)	Colbinabbin	18.10 (118) – 7.12 (54)
2001	Mount Pleasant (17)	Broadford	10.8 (68) – 6.8 (44)
2002	Colbinabbin (9)	Lockington Bawawm United	15.10 (100) – 11.9 (75)
2003	Colbinabbin (10)	Broadford	20.13 (133) – 16.16 (102)
2004	Colbinabbin (11)	White Hills	6.14 (50) – 2.9 (21)
2005	Mount Pleasant (18)	White Hills	16.14 (110) – 12.15 (87)
2006	Mount Pleasant (19)	Elmore	19.13 (127) – 13.12 (90)
2007	Elmore (5)	Colbinabbin	26.29 (185) – 12.14 (86)
2008	Colbinabbin (12)	Heathcote	16.9 (105) – 12.11 (83)
2009	Heathcote (6)	Colbinabbin	15.17 (107) – 15.13 (103)
2010	Heathcote (7)	Lockington Bamawm United	8.8 (56) – 5.9 (39)
2011	Lockington Bamawm United (1)	Heathcote	15.9 (99) – 14.9 (93)
2012	Lockington Bamawm United (2)	North Bendigo	21.14 (140) – 7.4 (46)
2013	Lockington Bamawm United (3)	Huntly	15.13 (103) – 6.9 (45)
2014	Lockington Bamawm United (4)	North Bendigo	13.9 (87) – 11.10 (76)
2015	North Bendigo (1)	Leitchville Gunbower	10.13 (73) – 8.15 (63)
2016	North Bendigo (2)	Leitchville Gunbower	14.18 (102) – 13.4 (82)
2017	Leitchville Gunbower (1)	North Bendigo	15.18 (108) – 12.10 (82)
2018	Leitchville Gunbower (2)	North Bendigo	14.10 (94) – 12.13 (85)
2019	North Bendigo (3)	Colbinabbin	10.10 (70) – 4.10 (34)
2020	Season cancelled due to COVID-19 pandemic in Victoria		
2021	Season abandoned due to COVID-19 pandemic in Victoria (Note: The season was abandoned prior to the first match of the finals series, with alterations throughout the season. The minor premiers were Lockington Bamawm United, whom had won all twelve matches played.)		
2022	Lockington Bamawm United (5)	Mount Pleasant	13.11 (89) – 10.9 (69)
2023	Mount Pleasant (20)	Heathcote	12.7 (79) – 9.6 (60)
2024	White Hills (2)	Leitchville Gunbower	17.11 (113) – 6.6 (42)
2025	Mount Pleasant (21)	North Bendigo	13.11 (89) – 13.6 (84)
2026	North Bendigo (4)	Mount Pleasant	13.14 (92) – 12.9 (81)

== Books ==
- History of Football in the Bendigo District – John Stoward – ISBN 978-0-9805929-1-7
