= Mount Pleasant Football Club =

Australian Rules Football club

Names
- Full name: Mount Pleasant Football Netball Club
- Nickname: Mighty Mounts

2024 season
- Home-and-away season: 6th
- Leading goalkicker: Benjamin Bisset (41)
- Best and fairest: Jack Hickman

Club details
- Founded: 1889; 137 years ago
- Colours: Navy Blue White
- Competition: HDFL
- Premierships: HDFL (senior premierships 20) 1962, 1966, 1967, 1968, 1971, 1979, 1980, 1981, 1983, 1984, 1990, 1993, 1994, 1995, 1997, 2000, 2001, 2005, 2006, 2023 + Campaspe Valley League premierships 1923, 1925, 1926, 1927
- Ground: Toolleen Recreation Reserve, Toolleen

Other information
- Official website: MPFNC

The Mount Pleasant Football Club is an Australian Rules Football club that competes in the HDFL.

The club is based in Toolleen, Victoria and has participated in the HDFL since 1935.

The Mighty Mounts have appeared in 31 grand finals, winning twenty one, with the most recent in 2025.

== Location ==
Shire of Campaspe
Location of Mount Pleasant (Victoria)

== History ==
Local players first played under the name of Mount Pleasant Football Club in 1889. Prior to this, players from around the Runnymede district, including Creek View, played under the name Runnymede and for many years they played in the paddocks of local farming families. It was not until 1952 that the club’s headquarters became the Toolleen Recreation Reserve.

The club’s name comes from the Mount Pleasant Creek, a eminently close to the original farming paddocks played on, and an old map indicates a Mount Pleasant existed at Creek View. MPFC was made up of families who settled in the Runnymede district, mainly from Ireland and England, families who still to this day have a large influence and presence in the club. In their time they have seen many clubs come and go including Runnymede, Avonmore, Muskerry, Fosterville, Goornong, Axedale, Knowsley, Toolleen, and Crosbie, in which MPFC has welcomed players and supporters from each and everyone one of them into their fold.

=== Success (1962 – present) ===
Mount Pleasant is one of the oldest and most successful clubs in the HDFNL, having won 21 premierships and finished as runners-up nine times. The club has also won premierships in consecutive seasons on multiple occasions and finished as runners-up in consecutive seasons on multiple occasions. Based in the small town of Toolleen, the club has maintained a strong record of success in the league.

== Rivalries ==
Because of the relatively small sized league rivalries are few and far between in the Heathcote District Football League. Mount Pleasant's rivals are Heathcote, Colbinabbin, and Elmore. Two of the clubs come from within the same region, Shire of Campaspe.

== Honours ==
HDFL

Premierships & Grand Finals

Year	Winner	Runner-up	Score
1962	Mount Pleasant	Heathcote Rovers	65 – 43
1966	Mount Pleasant	Heathcote North	74 – 62
1967	Mount Pleasant	Heathcote	94 – 71
1968	Mount Pleasant	Rushworth	101 – 89
1971	Mount Pleasant	Heathcote	122 – 68
1979	Mount Pleasant	Colbinabbin	112 – 107
1980	Mount Pleasant	Elmore	115 – 84
1981	Mount Pleasant	Colbinabbin	108 – 100
1983	Mount Pleasant	Stanhope	62 – 44
1984	Mount Pleasant	Elmore	149 - 81
1990	Mount Pleasant	Heathcote	108 – 84
1993	Mount Pleasant	Heathcote	100 – 80
1994	Mount Pleasant	Heathcote	91 – 83
1995	Mount Pleasant	Heathcote	82 – 77
1997	Mount Pleasant	Elmore	86 – 78
2000	Mount Pleasant	Colbinabbin	118 – 54
2001	Mount Pleasant	Broadford	68 – 44
2005	Mount Pleasant	White Hills	110 – 87
2006	Mount Pleasant	Elmore	127 – 90
2023	Mount Pleasant	Heathcote	79 – 60
2025	Mount Pleasant	North Bendigo	13.11 (89) to 13.6 (84)

== Books ==
- History of Football in the Bendigo District – John Stoward – ISBN 978-0-9805929-1-7
- Mt Pleasant Football & Netball Club History Book 1889 - 2000
