= Peter Francis (footballer) =

Australian rules footballer

Personal information
- Born: 16 January 1958 (age 68); Heathcote, Victoria
- Original team: Heathcote (HDFL)
- Debut: Round 3, 1979, Carlton vs. Essendon, at Waverley Park
- Height: 185 cm (6 ft 1 in)
- Weight: 83 kg (183 lb)

Playing career^{1}
Years	Club	Games (Goals)
1979–1981	Carlton	47 (15)
1981–1983	Fitzroy	40 (19)
1984–1986	Richmond	52 (22)
1987–1988	Essendon	19 (2)
1989–1990	Box Hill	13 (12)
Total		173 (70)

Representative team honours
Years	Team	Games (Goals)
1984	Victoria	1 (0)
- ^{1} Playing statistics correct to the end of 1988.

Career highlights
- Carlton premiership player - 1979

Peter Francis (born 16 January 1958) is a former Australian rules footballer who played with four VFL clubs during the 1980s.

Born in Heathcote, Victoria, Francis attended White Hills Technical School in Bendigo and played for Heathcote in the Heathcote District Football League (HDFL) before joining Carlton in 1977, making his senior debut two seasons later in Round 1 1979. He played in their thrilling five point Grand Final win against Collingwood that year in what would be the only premiership of his ten season career.

Halfway through the 1981 VFL season Francis was traded to Fitzroy for fellow wingman Frank Marchesani. He played 40 games with Fitzroy before moving on to Richmond and then finished his career with a stint at Essendon.

For the 1989 and 1990 seasons, Francis served as the head coach of Box Hill in the Victorian Football Association (VFA), guiding the club to third place in 1989, equalling its best VFA result to that time.

Francis was appointed St Kilda's's Reserves/Development Coach in 1991, a role he held until 1994.

In 1995 Francis was appointed coach of the Gippsland Power Football Club in the AFL Elite Player Pathway TAC Cup Competition and held that position until 2000. He then took over the role of Regional/Talent Manager of the Gippsland Power Football Club in 2001 until his retirement in 2019.
