= Cooper Hamilton =

Australian rules footballer (born 2003)

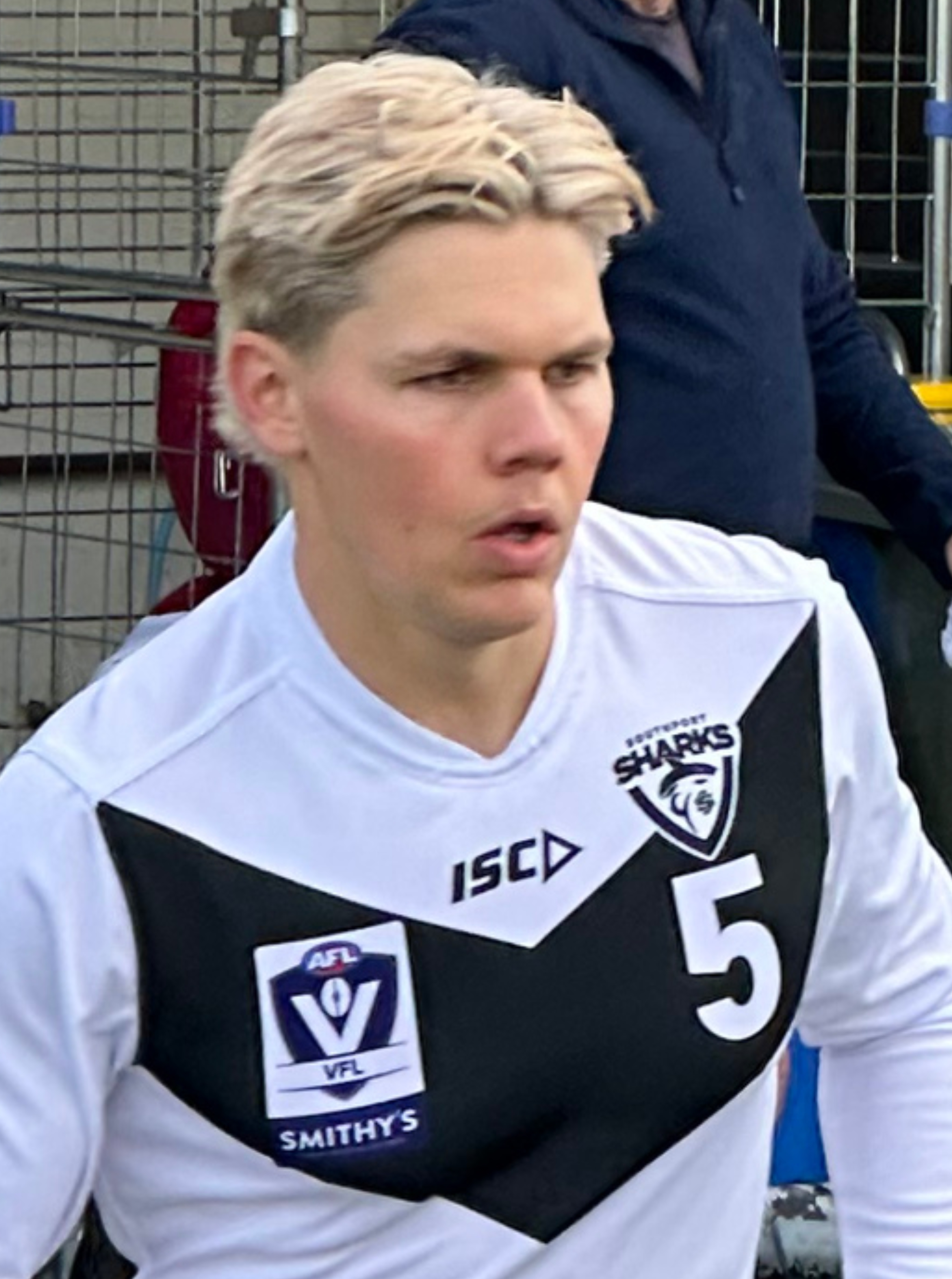
- Hamilton playing for Southport in 2026

Personal information
- Full name: Cooper Hamilton
- Born: 24 September 2003 (age 23)
- Original teams: Bendigo Pioneers (NAB League)/ Colbinabbin Football Club (HDFL)
- Draft: No. 13, 2022 rookie draft
- Debut: Round 7, 2022, Greater Western Sydney vs. Adelaide, at Adelaide Oval
- Height: 185 cm (6 ft 1 in)
- Weight: 88 kg (194 lb)
- Position: Forward

Club information
- Current club: Southport

Playing career^{1}
Years	Club	Games (Goals)
2022–2024	Greater Western Sydney	8 (1)
- ^{1} Playing statistics correct to the end of round 24, 2024.

Cooper Hamilton (born 24 September 2003) is an Australian rules footballer who currently plays for the Southport Sharks in the Victorian Football League (VFL). He previously played for the Greater Western Sydney Giants in the Australian Football League (AFL).

== Career ==
Hamilton played with the Bendigo Pioneers in the NAB League and the Colbinabbin Football Club in the Heathcote District Football League (HDFL) before being drafted to the Giants with pick 13 in the 2022 rookie draft. During the 2022 pre-season, Hamilton broke the club's two-kilometre time trial record.

He played his first game for the Giants' reserves team in round 1 of the 2022 Victorian Football League (VFL) season. Hamilton made his AFL debut in round 7 against Adelaide, recording 12 disposals in a 59-point victory. He played in another three games in 2022 and four games in 2023, and was given a one-year contract extension at the end of the season.

Beginning in 2023, Hamilton appeared in a number of viral videos released by the club on social media. This included a video released prior to the 2023 preliminary final against Collingwood, which the Giants lost.

Hamilton did not play any AFL games for the Giants in 2024. He was delisted at the end of the season. On 20 December 2024, it was announced that Hamilton had joined Carlton's reserves team for the 2025 VFL season.
