= Huntly, Victoria =

Huntly
- Suburb
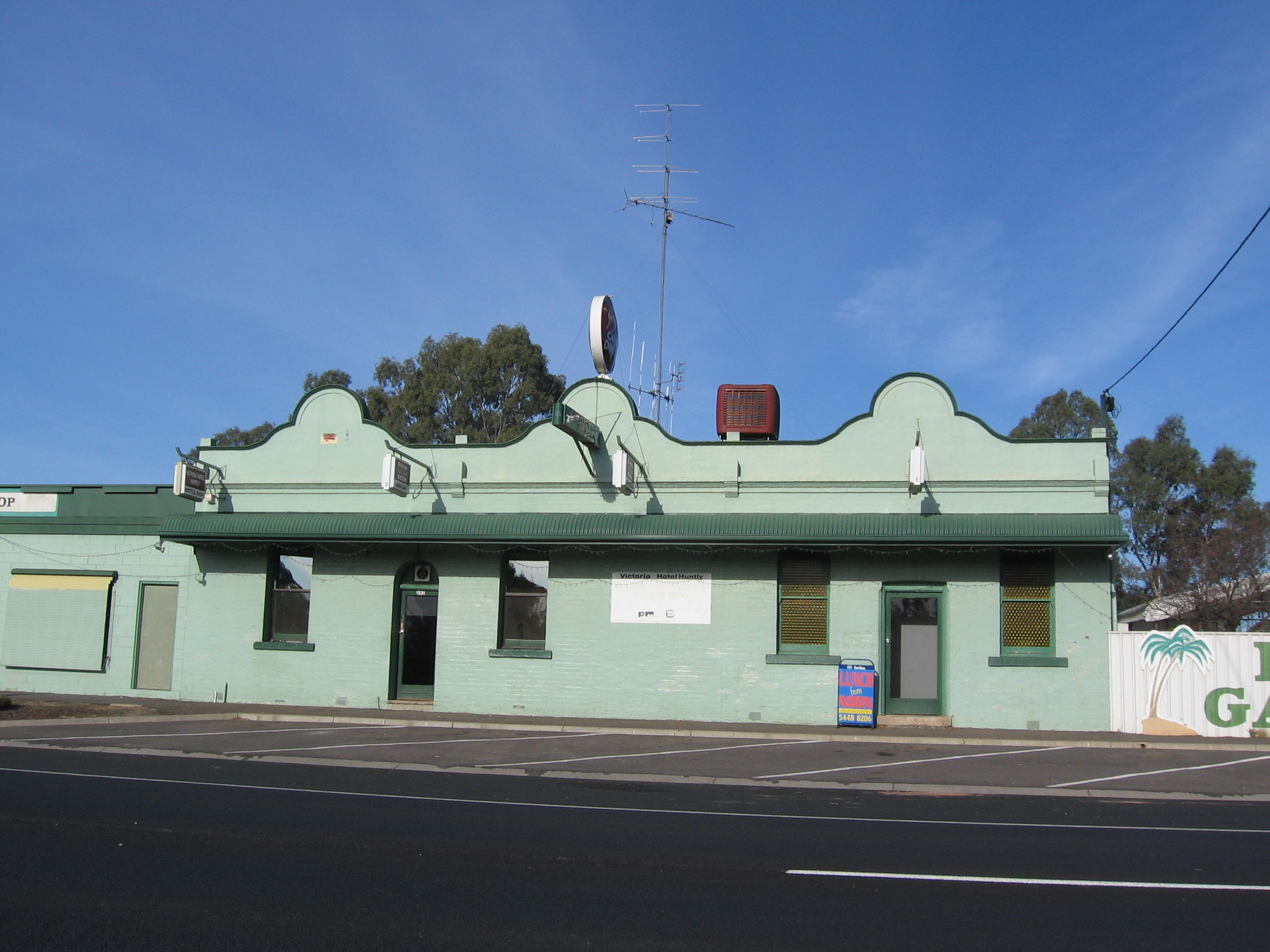
- Victoria Hotel in Huntly

- Interactive map of Huntly
- Coordinates: 36.6649°S 144.3290°E
- Country: Australia
- State: Victoria
- City: Bendigo
- LGA: City of Greater Bendigo
- Location: 169 km (105 mi) from Melbourne; 91.6 km (56.9 mi) from Echuca; 11.8 km (7.3 mi) from Bendigo
- Established: 1861

Government
  - State electorate: Bendigo East
  - Federal division: Bendigo

Population
  - Total: 2,379 (2016 census)
- Time zone: AEDT
- Postcode: 3551

Huntly is a suburb in northern Bendigo, Victoria, Australia in the City of Greater Bendigo local government area, 169 kilometres north of the state capital, Melbourne. At the 2016 census, Huntly had a population of 2,379.

== History ==
Huntly is located on the Midland Highway, 12 km north-east of Bendigo. The name is thought to have been inspired by Huntly, Aberdeenshire, Scotland. The name was first given to the local parish in a map drawn in 1854.

Bendigo was the site of one of Victoria’s largest gold rushes in 1851, but prospecting did not extend to Huntly until some years later. It was used for pastoral and horticultural activities for food for the goldfields.

== The Town today ==
Huntly has a war memorial for the soldiers who fought for Australia. It also has a primary school, but because of its closeness to Bendigo and rural areas the population can access Bendigo's resources as their own. Huntly also has an Australian rules football team that plays in the HDFL called the Huntly Hawks. Since its beginning, it has become runner-up in 2013.
