= Bendigo Botanic Gardens =

Botanic gardens in White Hills, Bendigo, Australia

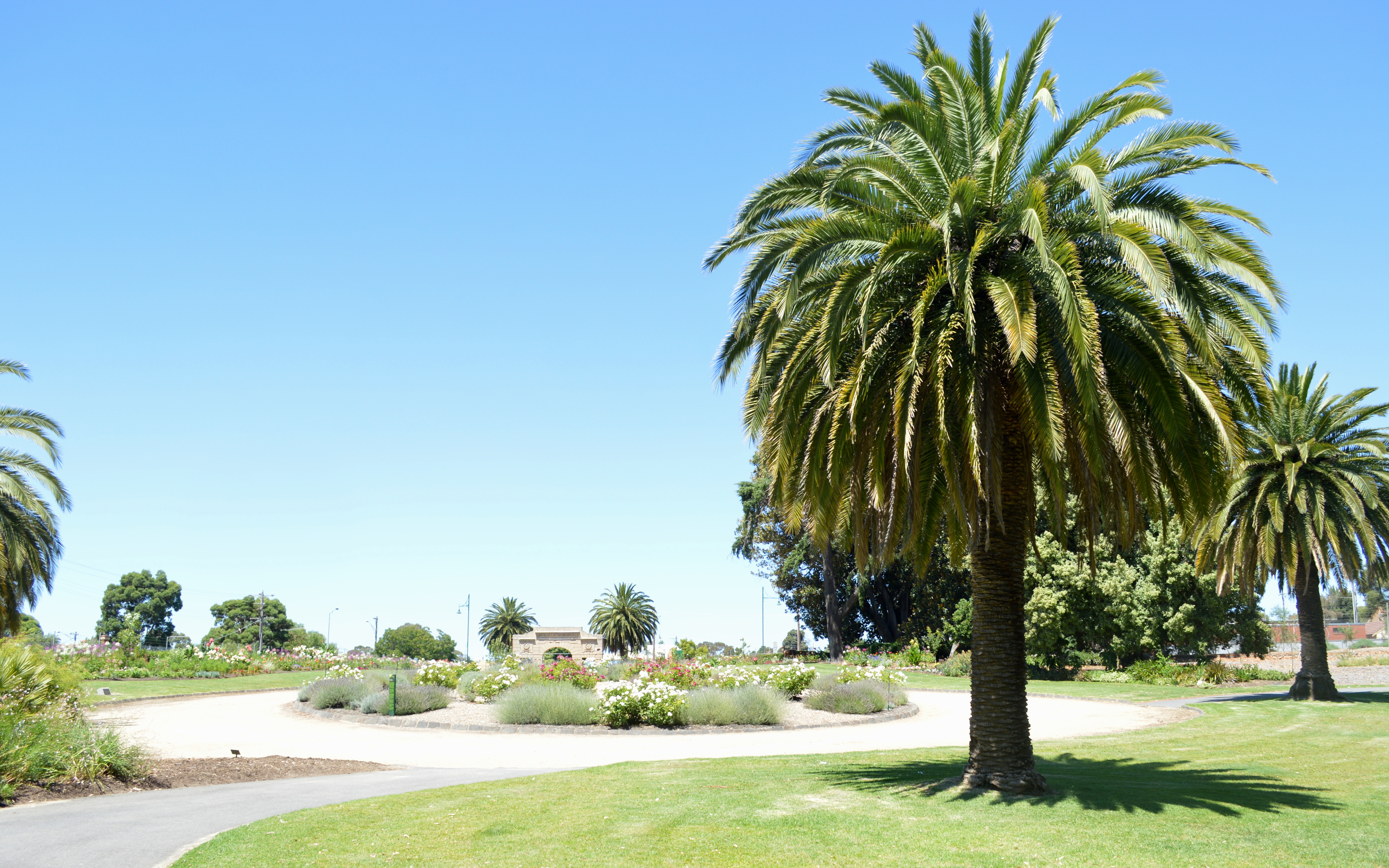
- Interactive map of Bendigo Botanic Gardens
- Type: Botanical
- Location: White Hills, Victoria
- Coordinates: 36°43′26″S 144°18′36″E
- Owner: City of Greater Bendigo
- Website: https://www.bendigo.vic.gov.au/things-do/gardens-and-natural-reserves/bendigo-botanic-gardens

The Bendigo Botanic Gardens, formerly known as the White Hills Botanical Garden, are Australian botanic gardens in the Bendigo suburb of White Hills, Victoria. The gardens are one of regional Victoria's earliest botanic gardens.

The Bendigo Botanic Gardens were founded in 1857 after land had been reserved for the site on the 1854 plan of Bendigo. The gardens were added to the Victorian Heritage Register in 2001 due to their architectural, scientific, social, aesthetic and historical significance.

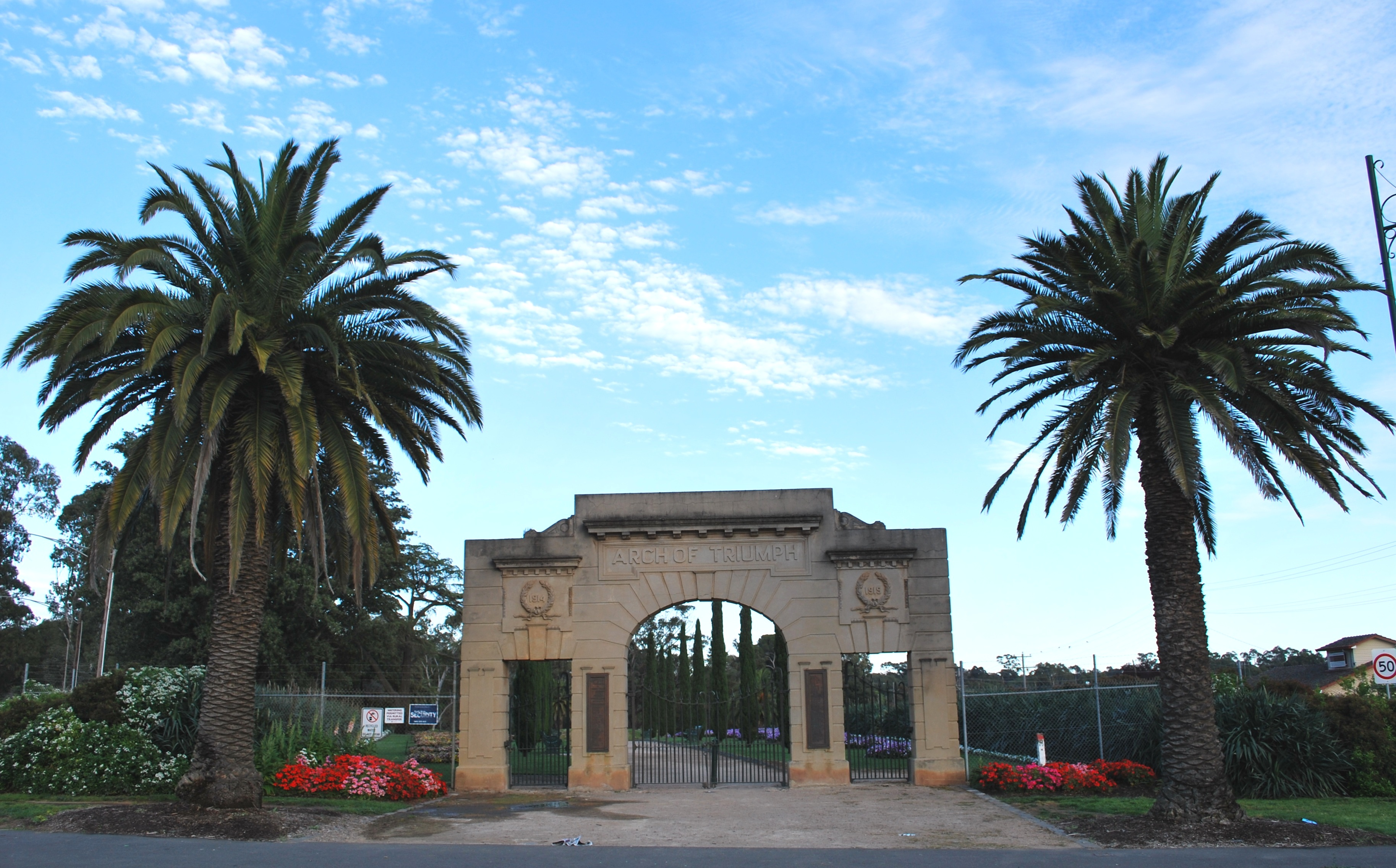
The Arch of Triumph at the Bendigo Botanic Gardens

In 1925, an Arch of Triumph was erected on the Napier Street (Midland Highway) entrance as a memorial to the fallen from the First World War.
