= White Hills Football Club =

Names
- Full name: White Hills Football & Netball Club
- Nickname(s): Demons

2024 season
- After finals: 1st
- Home-and-away season: 1st
- Leading goalkicker: Kaiden Antonowicz
- Best and fairest: Ben Taylor

Club details
- Founded: 1924; 101 years ago
- Colours: Black Red
- Competition: HDFL
- Premierships: HDFL (2) 1988, 2024
- Ground(s): Tint-a-Car Oval, White Hills

Other information
- Official website: WHFNC

The White Hills Football Club is an Australian Rules Football club which competes in the Heathcote District Football League.

The club, known as the White Hills Demons, is based in White Hills, Victoria, and has participated in the HDFL since 1984.

The Demons have appeared in 5 grand finals, winning two; the most recent in 2024.

== Location ==
Greater Bendigo
Location of North Bendigo (Victoria)

== History ==
=== Early years ===
A team from White Hills first entered the Bendigo DFA in 1924, it lost the grand final by 6 points that year. That was the last final appearance before the club went into recess after the 1933 season.

Reformed after WWII in 1948 the club again entered the Bendigo DFA, premierships followed in 1950, 1952, 1957 and 1958. In 1960 the competition was renamed the Golden City FL and the premierships came in 1963, 1968, 1969, 1971, and 1980. In 1981 the Golden City FL became the second division of the Bendigo Football League and White Hills competed in the lower division. In 1983 the BFL became one competition and White Hills finished last with only one win.

=== HDFL (1984 – current) ===
Seeking a lower form of competition White Hills opted to transfer to the Heathcote District Football League. In White Hills' early years in HDFL it has had its peak in quality football and its most success in its history. From 1984 to 1988 it won one premiership and was runner-up once as well however three years after its entrance into the league it was runner-up which was surprisingly early, and year later it won the 1988 HDFL Grand Final.

In 2004 White Hills had finished in second in the HDFL and had looked like it was going to win another premiership after a pretty long Final drought however they fell short to Colbinabbin who had won the flag three times in a row. But they were looking to get back up their in the next season (2005) but unfortunately fell short again and it looked like they had rejuvenated the squad again and was looking like they had their finals hopes up, but they haven't been the same since those early days in 1988.

== Rivalries ==
Because of the small sized football league rivalries are few and far between and most teams aren't overly aggressive towards another team; however, White Hills's biggest rivals are North Bendigo, Huntly, Heathcote & Colbinabbin.

== Honours ==
HDFL

Premierships & Grand Finals

Year	Competition	Winner	Runner-up	Score
1950	Bendigo DFA	White Hills	Kennington	14.15.69 – 8.6.54
1952	Bendigo DFA	White Hills	Kennington	6.18.54 – 7.9.51
1957	Bendigo DFA	White Hills	Harcourt	15.8.98 – 13.9.87
1958	Bendigo DFA	White Hills	Chewton	9.15.69 – 9.8.62
1963	Golden City FL	White Hills	Kennington	8.4.52 – 6.8.44
1968	Golden City FL	White Hills	North Bendigo	14.18.102 – 11.9.75
1969	Golden City FL	White Hills	Northern United	5.17.47 – 6.9.45
1971	Golden City FL	White Hills	YCW	12.7.79 – 10.14.74
1980	Golden City FL	White Hills	North Bendigo	13.18.96 – 10.12.72
1988	Heathcote DFL	White Hills	Stanhope	12.14.86 – 9.10.64
2024	Heathcote DFL	White Hills	Leitchville Gunbower	17.11.113 - 6.6.42

== Books ==
- History of Football in the Bendigo District – John Stoward – ISBN 978-0-9805929-1-7
