= Frank Marchesani =

Australian rules footballer

Personal information
- Full name: Frank Marchesani
- Born: 2 February 1960 (age 66)
- Original team: Marcellin College
- Height: 188 cm (6 ft 2 in)
- Weight: 83 kg (183 lb)
- Position: Wing

Playing career^{1}
Years	Club	Games (Goals)
1980	Fitzroy	16 (17)
1981–1985	Carlton	36 (26)
1986	Essendon	0 (0)
Total		52 (43)
- ^{1} Playing statistics correct to the end of 1986.

Career highlights
- Recruit of the Year, 1980

Frank Marchesani (born 2 February 1960) is a former Australian rules footballer who played with Fitzroy and Carlton in the Victorian Football League (VFL). After having a promising start in his first season at Fitzroy, he sought clearance to be transferred to Carlton. The move was said to be motivated by financial gain, however Marchesani has since denied this claim. In his first season, he failed to live up to expectation – this was only compounded by the fact that his move to Carlton included the popular Peter Francis being traded in return. Marchesani planned to retire after the 1985 season due to injury problems, however he was enticed by Essendon to continue playing the following season. This new chance was to prove unsuccessful, with another injury ending his career before he was able to play a single senior game at Essendon.
