= Leitchville Gunbower Football Club =

Names
- Full name: Leitchville Gunbower Football & Netball Club
- Nickname(s): Bombers

2017 season
- After finals: 1st (Premiers)
- Home-and-away season: 2nd

Club details
- Founded: 1995; 30 years ago
- Colours: Red Black
- Competition: HDFL
- Premierships: HDFL (2); 2017, 2018
- Ground(s): Leitchville Recreation Reserve, Leitchville; Gunbower Recreation Reserve, Gunbower

Other information
- Official website: LGFNC

The Leitchville Gunbower Football Club, known as the Bombers, is an Australian Rules Football club which has competed in the HDFL since 2010.

The Bombers won their first HDFL premiership in 2017, defeating North Bendigo, after losing the two preceding grand finals to the Bulldogs.

== History ==
In 1995 the Leitchville Maroons merged with the Gunbower Demons to form the Leitchville Gunbower Football Club. Both clubs had a long association in the Cohuna base Northern District Football League. In 1990 the Northern Districts FL merged with the Echuca FL to form the Northern and Echuca Football League. This league lasted for seven seasons before disbanding. In 1997 the club moved to the North Central Football League. After their five-year agreement was up they left for the geographically closer Central Murray Football League. Their time in the CMFL was not successful as they made the finals only once in 2007. The club searched for another competition that was a step down to what they had been competing in.

=== Successful Years (2010 – present) ===
In 2010 the club joined the HDFL, success was not immediately having collected the Wooden Spoon in 2012 but then improvement occurred. Leitchville Gunbower competed in four consecutive grand finals in 2015, 2016, 2017 and 2018, winning its first premiership in the 2017 season since joining the HDFL in 2010, beating North Bendigo. In 2018 the Bombers made it back-to-back premierships.

== Rivalries ==
Because of the small sized football league rivalries are few and far between and most teams aren't overly aggressive towards another team, however One of Leitchville Gunbower's biggest rivals has to be Lockington Bamawm United as they are the very close geographically to LG but also they have been in the league a short time as well. One of their other big rivals is North Bendigo.

== Honours ==
Grand Finals

Year	Competition	Winner	Runner-up	Score
1995	N&E FL	Leitchville Gunbower	Moama	56 – 53
2015	HDFL	North Bendigo	Leitchville Gunbower	73 – 63
2016	HDFL	North Bendigo	Leitchville Gunbower	102 – 82
2017	HDFL	Leitchville Gunbower	North Bendigo	108 – 82
2018	HDFL	Leitchville Gunbower	North Bendigo	94 – 85

== Location ==
Leitchville Gunbower (Victoria)
Shire of Gannawarra
Shire of Campaspe

== Books ==
- History of Football in the Bendigo District – John Stoward – ISBN 978-0-9805929-1-7
