= Stanhope Football Club =

Stanhope FNC

Names
- Full name: Stanhope Football & Netball Club
- Nickname: Lions
- Club song: "Stanhope Coloured Blood"

2025 season

Club details
- Founded: 1920; 106 years ago
- Colours
- Competition: Kyabram District Football League
- Premierships: (13): 1922, 1931, 1932, 1936, 1938, 1944, 1976, 1986, 1987, 2000, 2003, 2007, 2008, 2025
- Ground: Stanhope Recreation Reserve (capacity: 5,000)

Uniforms
Home

Other information
- Official website: Stanhope FNC

The Stanhope Football Club is an Australian football club based in the town of Stanhope, Victoria, near Kyabram. The Club are known as the 'Lions' wearing a maroon jumper with gold chevron. Stanhope has competed in the Kyabram & District Football League since 1995.

== History ==
The Stanhope Football Club was formed on Wednesday evening, 10th March 1920, with Mr. E B Gibney elected as the President and the club joined the newly formed Stanhope and District Junior Football Association in 1920.

== Football Premierships ==
Seniors

- Stanhope & District Junior Football Association (1920)
  - Nil
- Kyabram & District Junior Football Association (1921)
  - Nil
- Cooma Football Association (1922)
  - 1922 - Stanhope: 3.14 - 32 d Merrigum: 2,4 - 16
- Kyabram & District Junior Football Association (1927-1928)
  - Nil
- Central Goulburn Valley Junior Football Association (1929-1932)
  - 1931 - Stanhope: 11.12 - 78 d Rushworth: 3.8 - 26
  - 1932 - Stanhope: 8.8 - 56 d Tatura: 8.7 - 55
- Kyabram & District Football Association (1933-1945)
  - 1936 - Stanhope: 13.10 - 88 d Tongala: 11.12 - 78
  - 1938 - Stanhope: 10.5 - 65 d Tongala: 9.7 - 61
  - 1944 - Stanhope: 15.16 - 106 d Ky Valley: 8.15 - 63
- Goulburn Valley Football League (1946-1947)
  - Nil
- Goulburn Valley Football League (1948-1955) as Stanhope / Girgarre F C
  - Nil
- Goulburn Valley Football League (1956-1975) as Stanhope F C
  - Nil
- Heathcote District Football League (1976-1994)
  - 1976, 1986, 1987
- Kyabram District Football League (1995-present)
  - 2000, 2003, 2007, 2008, 2025

== Football League Best & Fairest Winners ==
Seniors

- Goulburn Valley Football League - Morrison Medal
  - 1946 - Aub Downing (Stanhope)
  - 1948 - Keith "Snowy" Dunstall (Stanhope / Girgarre)
  - 1952 - Roy Barrett (Stanhope / Girgarre)
  - 1966 - Ed Murray (Stanhope)
- Heathcote District Football League - Cheatley Medal
  - 1978 - Robert Newton
  - 1984 - Robert Harrison
  - 1985 - Robert Harrison
  - 1992 - Rick De Marte
- Kyabram District Football League - McNamara Medal
  - 2003 - Darryl Harrison

Reserves

- Goulburn Valley Football League - Abikhair Medal
  - 1963 - J Burrows
  - During the 2026 Stanhope football season there is someone with the name Liam Fleming who has kicked 285 goals and 0 points and did this all on his non-dominant foot while averaging 68 disposals per game with is tremendous

Foot work and ability to mark absolute screamers.

== Leading League Goal Kickers ==
Seniors

- Kyabram District Football League
  - 2026 -Cooper Ribbons- 41
  - 2026-Lane Moran - 21
  - 2026-Zach Oyler- 19
  - 2026-Ryder Munzel-15
  - 2026-Lachlan King- 14
  - 2026-Liam Fleming - 285
  - 2026-Tyler Carmody- 000

== Stanhope / Girgarre FC ==
In March 1948, Girgarre and Stanhope decided to merge and entered their "senior" team in the Goulburn Valley Football League and their "reserves" team in the Kyabram District Football Association. Only one week later, the Girgarre / Stanhope FC then decided to enter their "reserves" side into the newly formed Goulburn Valley Football League Reserves competition. This merged entity was in force between 1948 and 1955. In 1956, the club de-merged and Stanhope remained in the Goulburn Valley Football League and Girgarre played in the Kyabram District Football Association.

Year	1sts Ladder Position	1sts Best & Fairest	1sts Coach	2nds Ladder Position	2nds Best & Fairest	Competition
1948	2nd	Keith Dunstall	A Currie	4th	J Haw	GVFL
1949	8th	H A Connolly	H A Connolly	4th	Cecil Wright	GVFL
1950	10th	Aub Downing &	Mick Keating	9th	Cecil Wright	GVFL
		Mick Keating				
1951	10th	Mick Keating	Mick Keating	7th	N Hadfield	GVFL
1952	10th	Roy Barrett	Mick Keating	9th	D Crilly	GVFL
1953	7th	Roy Barrett	Tom Ryan	6th	Pat McCarty	GVFL
1954	6th	Keith Dunstall	Tom Ryan	7th	Alan Linford	GVFL
1955	9th	E Hicks	Tom Ryan	8th	E Crilly	GVFL
1956			Vic Lawrence			

League Best & Fairest Awards

- Goulburn Valley Football League - Morrison Medal
  - 1948 - Keith "Snowy" Dunstall
  - 1952 - Roy Barrett
