= Tooborac =

- Town
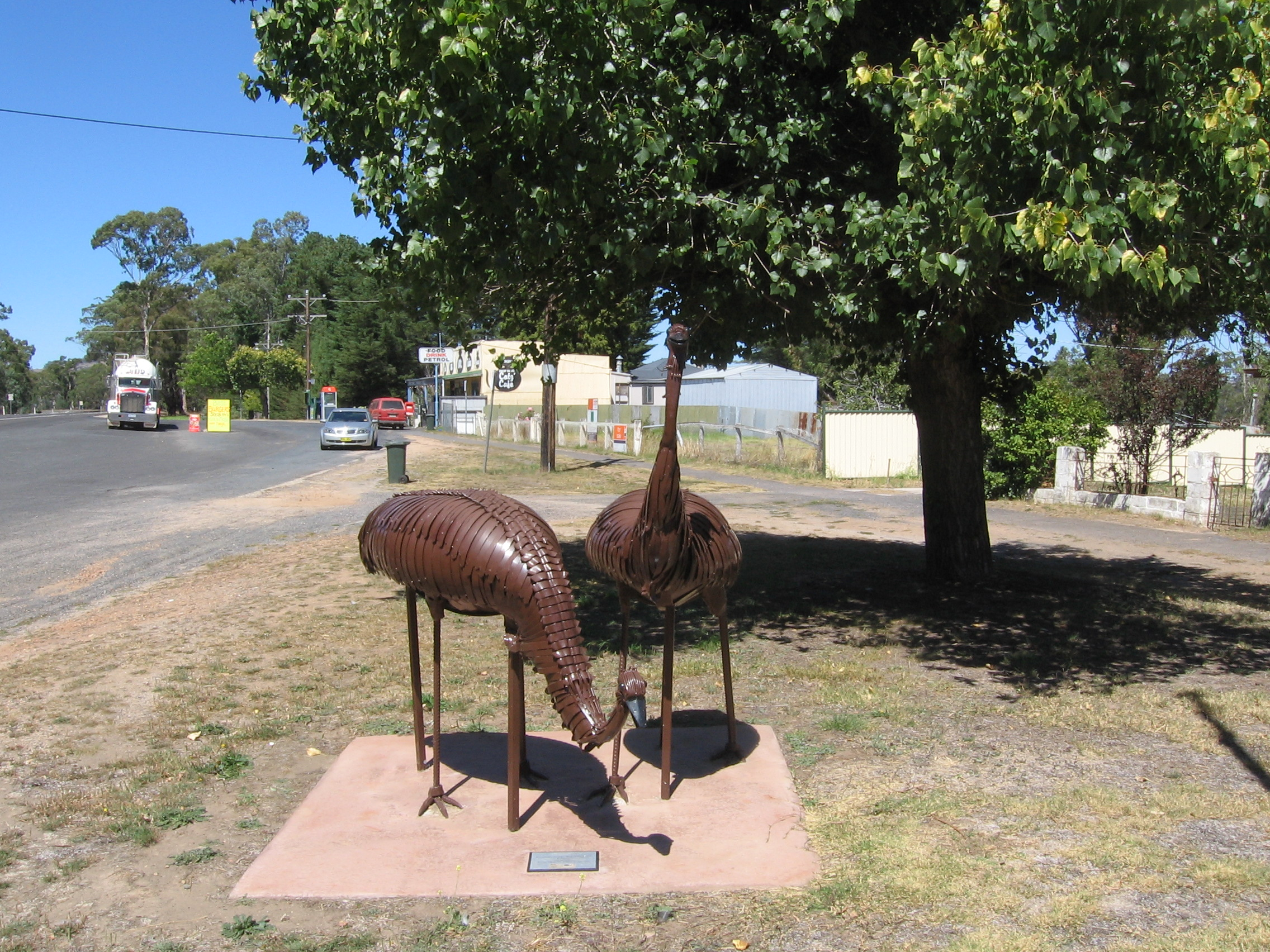
- Emu statues in the main street

- Interactive map of Tooborac
- Coordinates: 37°03′S 144°48′E
- Country: Australia
- State: Victoria
- Region: Hume
- LGA: Shire of Mitchell
- Location: 93 km (58 mi) N of Melbourne; 63 km (39 mi) SE of Bendigo; 35 km (22 mi) W of Seymour; 17 km (11 mi) S of Heathcote; 10 km (6.2 mi) N of Pyalong

Government
  - State electorate: Euroa
  - Federal division: Bendigo

Population
  - Total: 319 (SAL 2021)
- Postcode: 3522

Tooborac /ˈtuːbəræk/ is a town in Victoria, Australia. The town is in the Shire of Mitchell local government area, 93 kilometres (58 mi) north of the state capital, Melbourne. At the 2011 census, Tooborac and the surrounding area had a population of 405. At the 2016 census, Tooborac and the surrounding area had a population of 310.

Tooborac Post Office opened on 1 January 1872.

Tooborac has recently undergone a resurgence with the renovation of the Tooborac Hotel and the construction of a craft brewery. The 150-year-old two storey bluestone and ironstone hotel is a meeting place for locals and travellers alike.

Tooborac is known for its annual 'Octooberfest', a German Octoberfest themed event.
