= Costerfield =

- Suburb
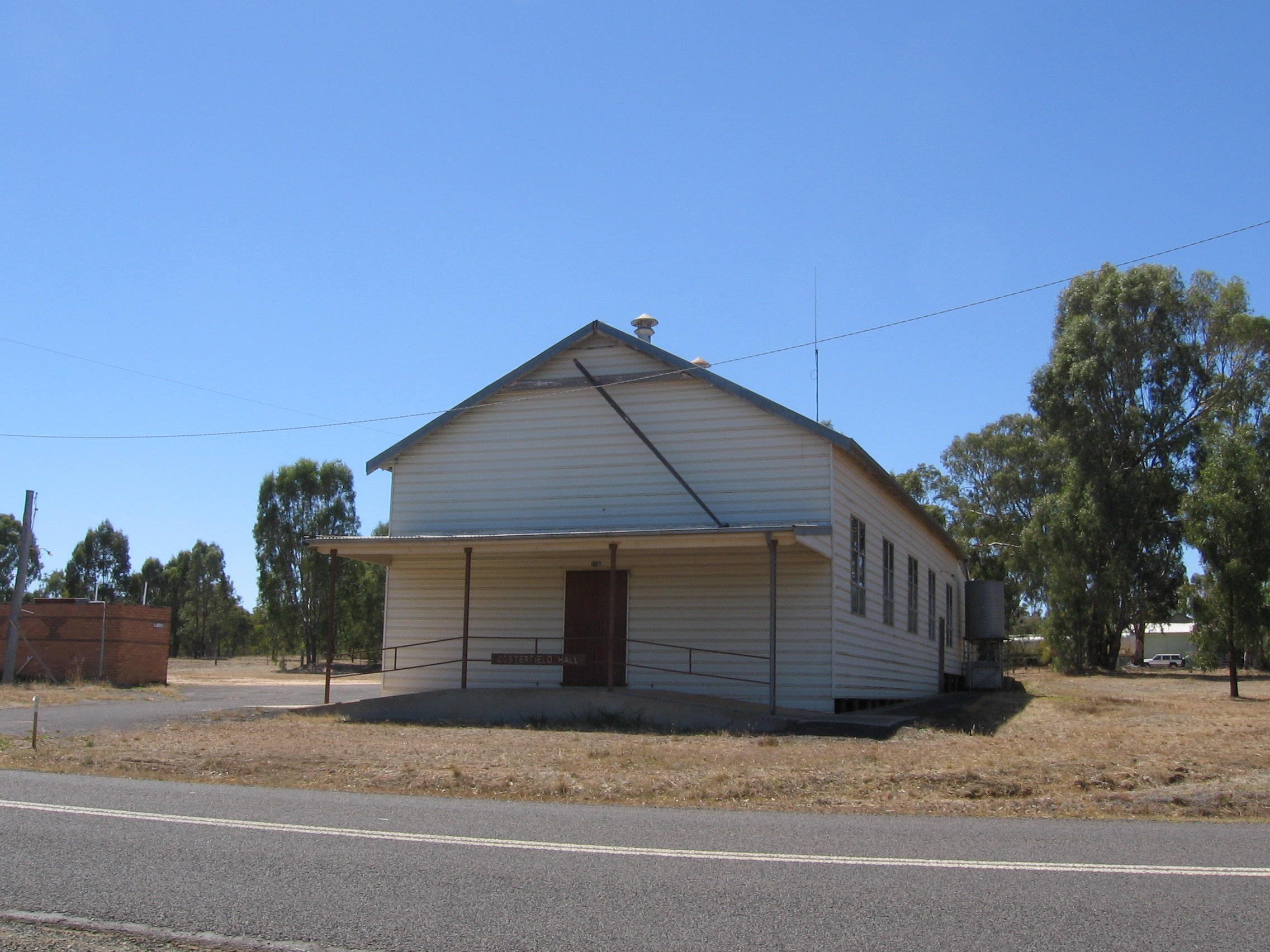
- Public hall at Costerfield, 2008

- Interactive map of Costerfield
- Coordinates: 36°52′31″S 144°47′45″E
- Country: Australia
- State: Victoria
- City: Bendigo
- LGA: City of Greater Bendigo
- Location: 126 km (78 mi) N of Melbourne; 61 km (38 mi) E of Bendigo; 12 km (7.5 mi) NE of Heathcote

Government
  - State electorate: Euroa
  - Federal division: Bendigo

Population
  - Total: 75 (2016 census)
- Postcode: 3523

Costerfield is a locality the City of Greater Bendigo, Victoria, Australia. The locality is 126 kilometres (78 mi) north of the state capital, Melbourne and 12 km north-east of Heathcote. At the 2016 census, Costerfield had a population of 75.

== History ==
Costerfield is a combination of the surnames of Alan Coster and Edwin Field, prospectors who found gold in the locality in 1861.

An Anglican school was opened in 1862 and closed in 1950. It was then reopened in 1962 and closed in 1992.
