= Huntly Football Club =

Australian Rules Football club

Names
- Full name: Huntly Football & Netball Club
- Nickname: Hawks

Club details
- Founded: 1893; 132 years ago
- Colours: Brown Gold
- Competition: Heathcote DFL
- Premierships: HDFL (0)
- Ground: Specialist Breeders Australia Oval, Huntly

Other information
- Official website: HuntlyFNC

Greater Bendigo

The Huntly Football Club is an Australian Rules Football club which competes in the Heathcote District Football League (HDFL).

The club, known as the Huntly Hawks, is based in Huntly, Victoria and has participated in the HDFL since 1986.

The Hawks have not appeared in an HDFL Grand Final yet, however, have most recently been Runners-up in 2013.

== History ==
Football had been played around Huntly from as early as 1882, but a formal club didn't emerge until 1893. It would play in local competitions usually against club to the north of Bendigo. It often played against Elmore for a donated cup. The club won its first trophy in 1894 and followed up in 1897 and 1901.

It first formal association was the Bendigo Saturday FA in 1913. In 1914 it won the pennant of the Bendigo Trades FA.

In 1919 it joined the Neilborough DFA and won three flags by the time it left at the end of 1930. It joined the short-lived Midland United FL while it lasted from 1931 to 1936 before joining the Bendigo District Association in 1937 winning flags in 1939 and 1940.

It reformed briefly in 1946 in the Bendigo FA until it went into recess at the end of 1952.

It reformed in 1985 with the merger of the Huntly Junior Football Club with the Provincial Football Club that was competing in the Heathcote DFL. Provincial had formed in 1946 after the war and played in the Bendigo FA that later renamed itself Golden City FL. Provincial had joined the Heathcote DFL in 1982.

The first year of the merger it was known as Provincial-Huntly Football Club but shorted to Huntly FL after twelve months.

=== Unsuccessful Era (1986 – present) ===
Since its existence in the HDFL in 1986–Present it has been the most unsuccessful team.

The club finished last every year from 2002 to 2011, ten consecutive wooden spoons. However, in recent years it has endures a string of finals appearances and was Runner-up in 2013 which was the club's most successful year in the league.

== Rivalries ==
Because of the small sized football league rivalries are few and far between and most teams aren't overly aggressive towards another team, however Huntly's main rivals are White Hills, North Bendigo & Lockington Bamawm United

== Honours ==
Premierships

- 1894, 1897, 1901, 1914, 1919, 1925, 1930, 1939 1940.

Grand Finals

Year	Competition	Winner	Runner-up	Score
2013	Heathcote DFL	Lockington Bamawm United	Huntly	103 – 45

== Books ==
- History of Football in the Bendigo District – John Stoward – ISBN 978-0-9805929-1-7
