= White Hills, Victoria =

White Hills
- Suburb
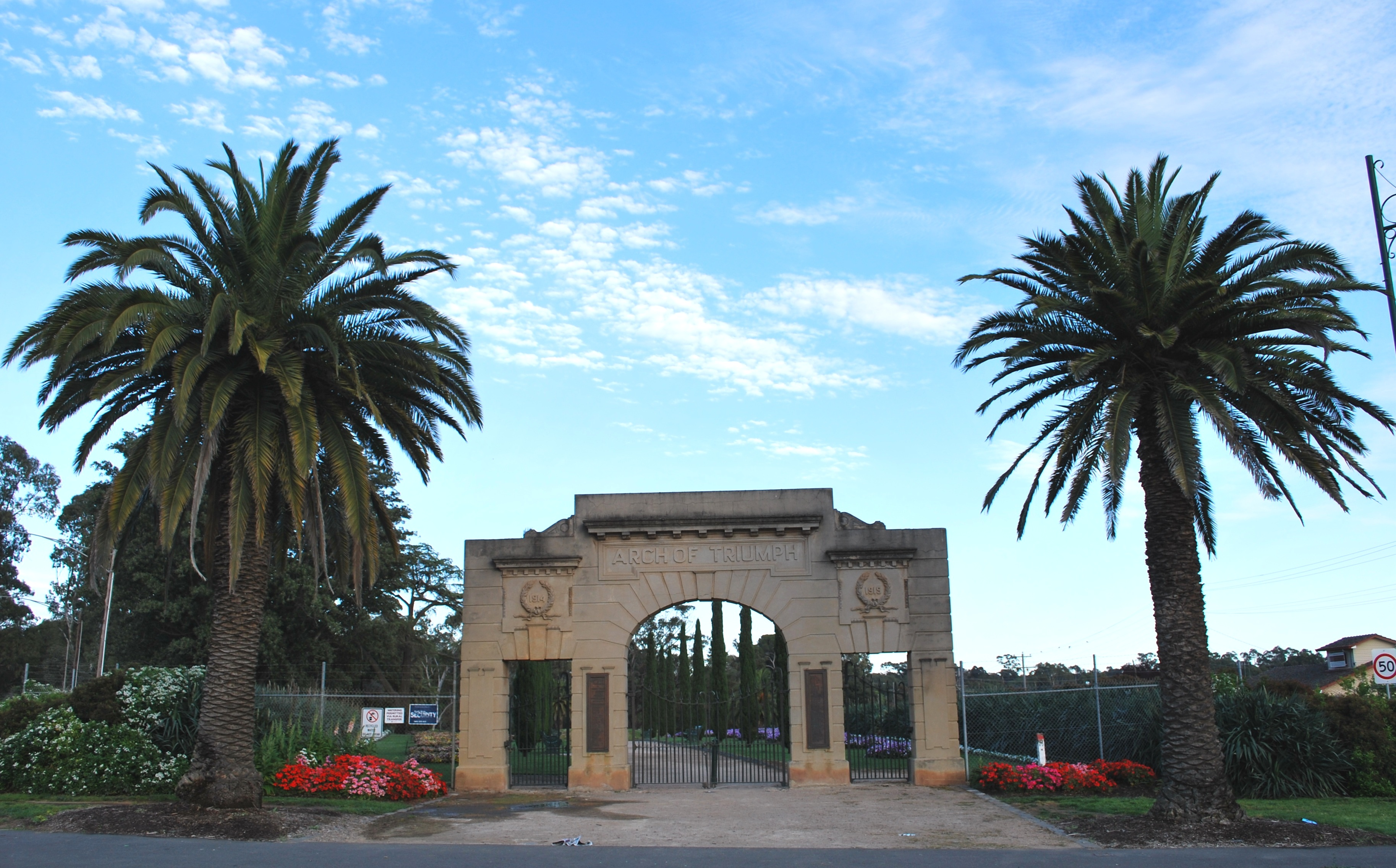
- War memorial entry to the Bendigo Botanic Gardens

- Interactive map of White Hills
- Coordinates: 36°44′S 144°18′E
- Country: Australia
- State: Victoria
- City: Bendigo
- LGA: City of Greater Bendigo
- Location: 4 km (2.5 mi) NE of Bendigo

Government
  - State electorate: Bendigo East
  - Federal division: Bendigo

Population
  - Total: 3,275 (2011 census)
- Postcode: 3550

White Hills is a suburb of the city of Bendigo in central Victoria, Australia. It is located four kilometres immediately north-east of the city centre between North Bendigo and East Bendigo.

"The White Hills" were named for the colour of the clay exposed by gold miners at that part of the Bendigo diggings in the 1850s.

The Bendigo Creek, the site of the area's first gold find, runs through White Hills.

At the 2011 census, White Hills had a population of 3,275.

== Facilities ==
White Hills Post Office opened on 21 August 1857 during the gold rush.

The Bendigo Jockey Club, a horse racing club, is based at the Bendigo racecourse in White Hills and the Bendigo Cup is run there in mid-November.

White Hills is the home of the White Hills Cricket Club; there is also a public swimming pool.

Weeroona College Bendigo, formerly known as White Hills Technical School, is a co-educational secondary college catering for students in years 7 to 10, is located in the suburb.

The Bendigo Botanic Gardens, formerly known as the White Hills Botanical Gardens, are located in the area.

== Notable people ==
- Alfred Hampson (1864–1924) Labor MLA for Bendigo East and MHR for Bendigo was born in White Hills
- Thomas Flanagan (1832–1899), who found the first gold in Kalgoorlie in 1893 with his companions Paddy Hannan and Daniel Shea, is buried in the White Hills cemetery
- Michael John Flannigan (1862–1901), nephew of Thomas Flanigan (above), after whom King Island's Lake Flannigan is named

== Gallery ==
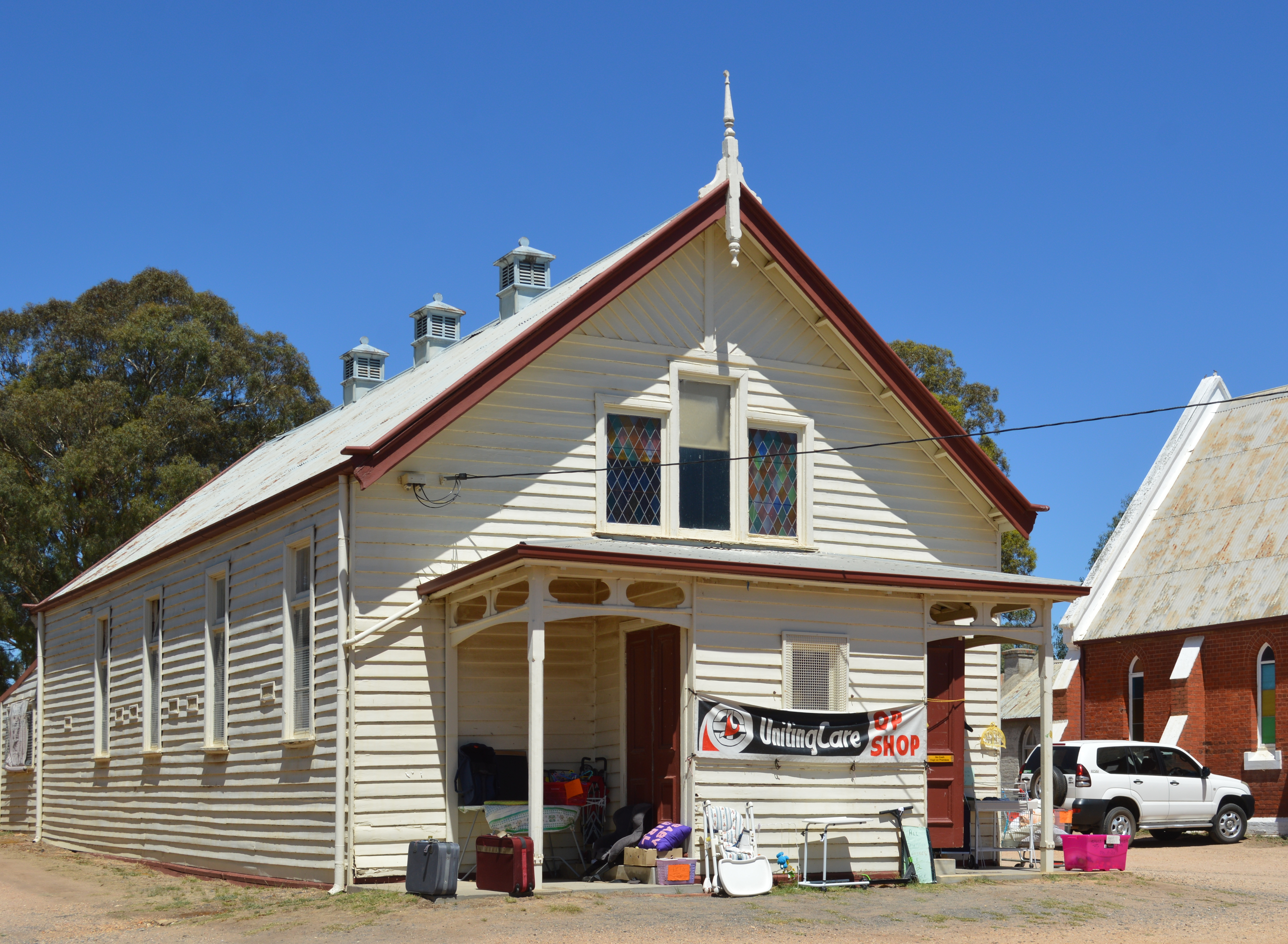
White Hills Uniting Church Hall

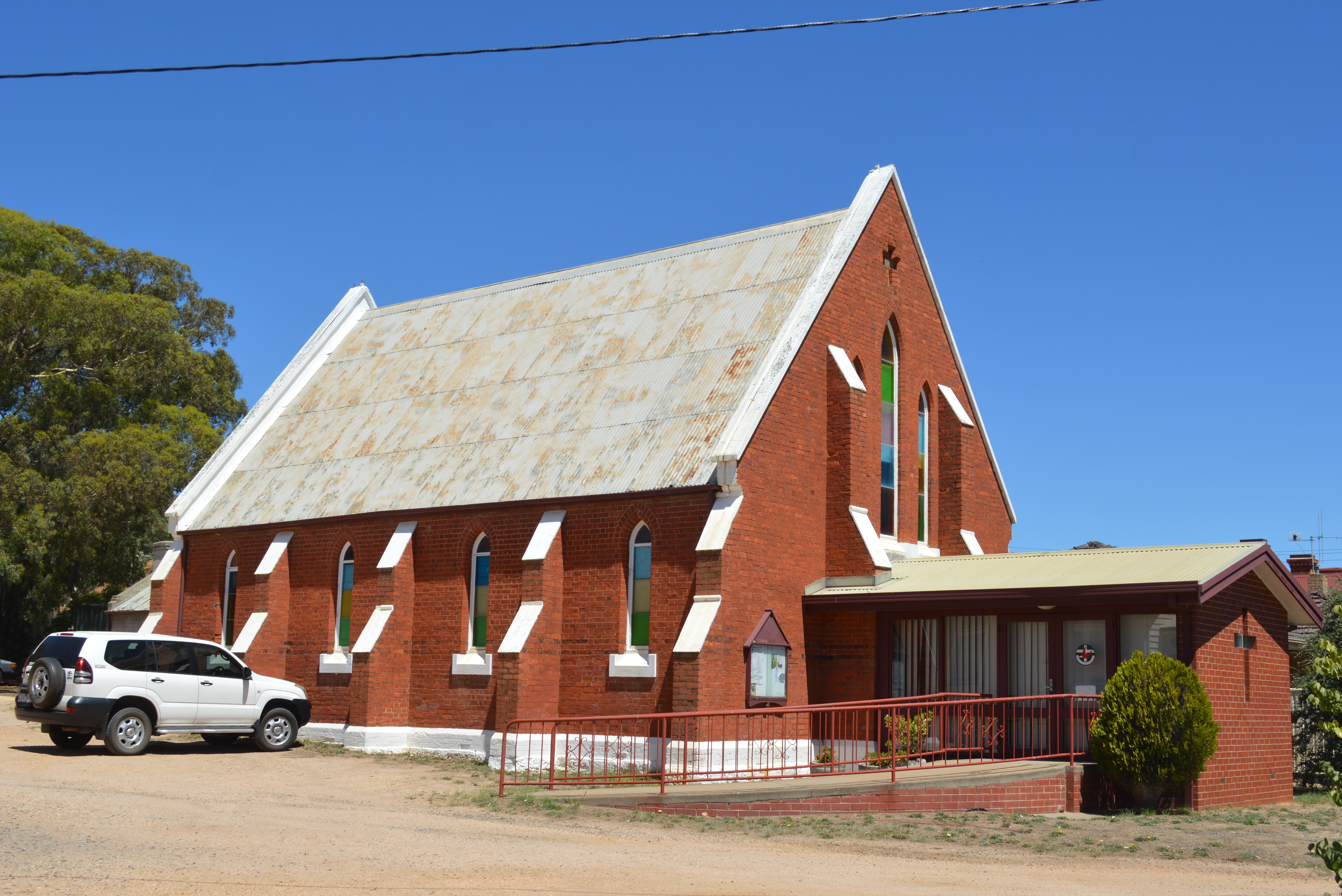
White Hills Uniting Church

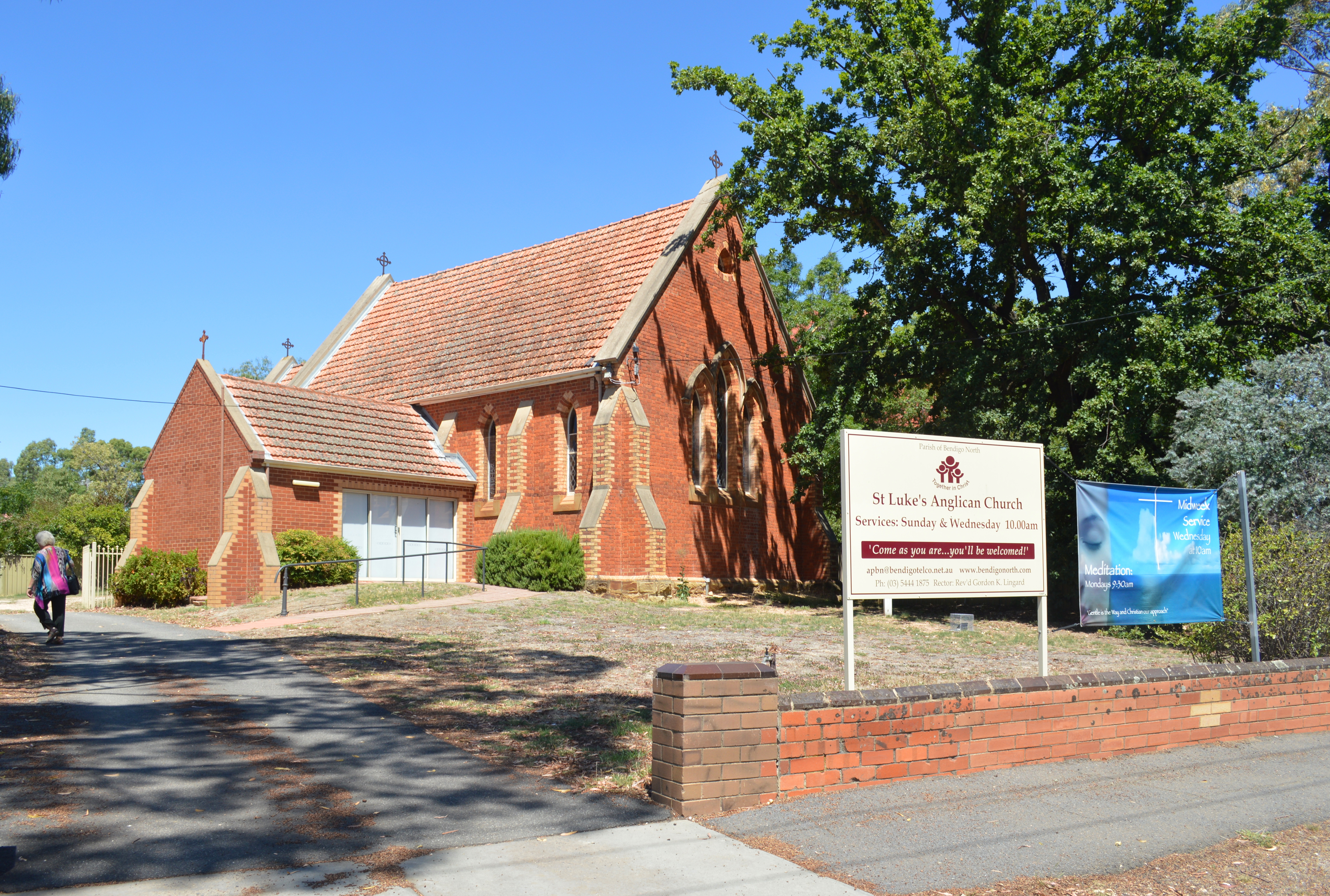
White Hills Anglican Church

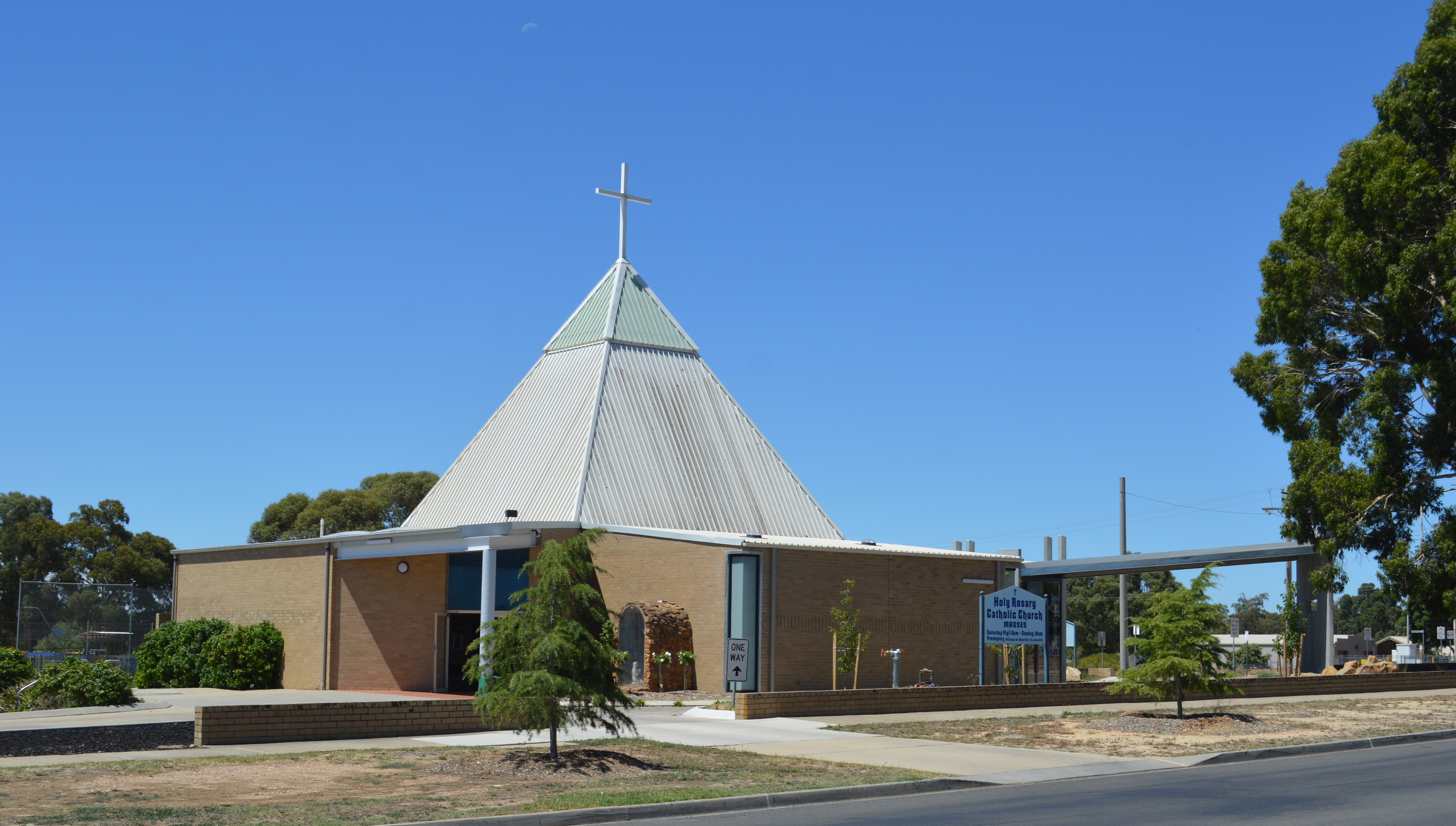
White Hills Catholic Church

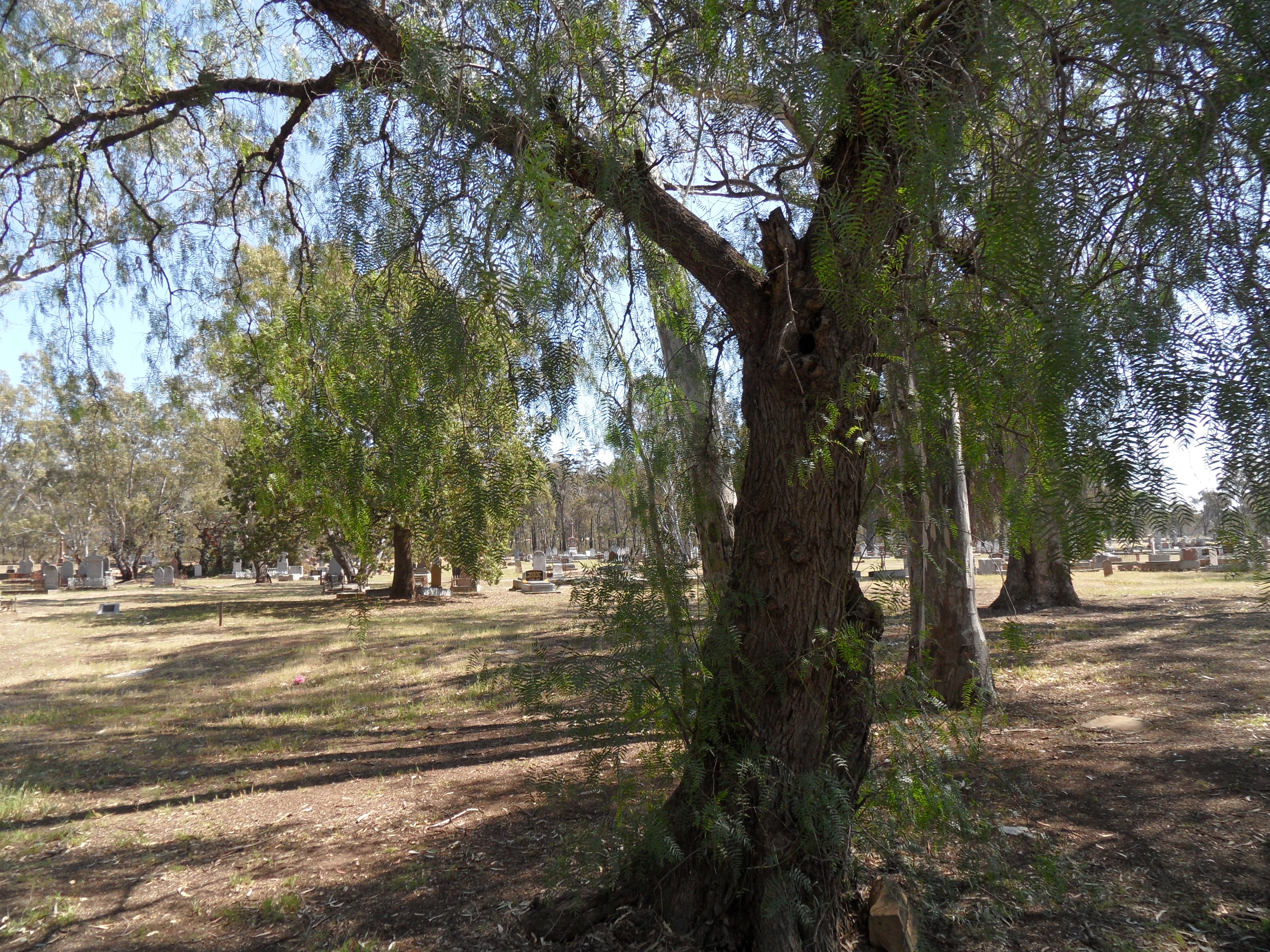
White Hills Cemetery shady entrance

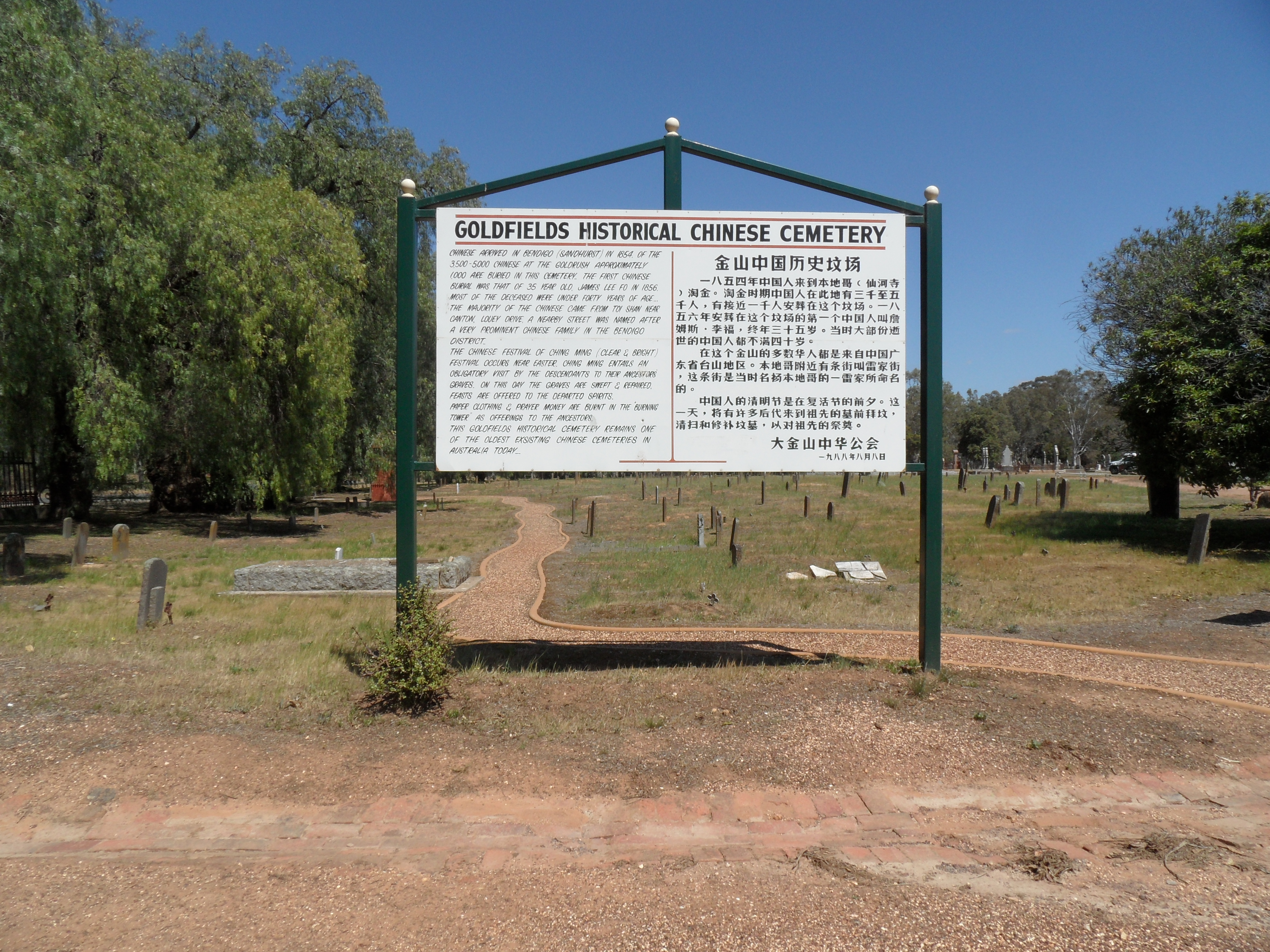
White Hills Cemetery Chinese Section

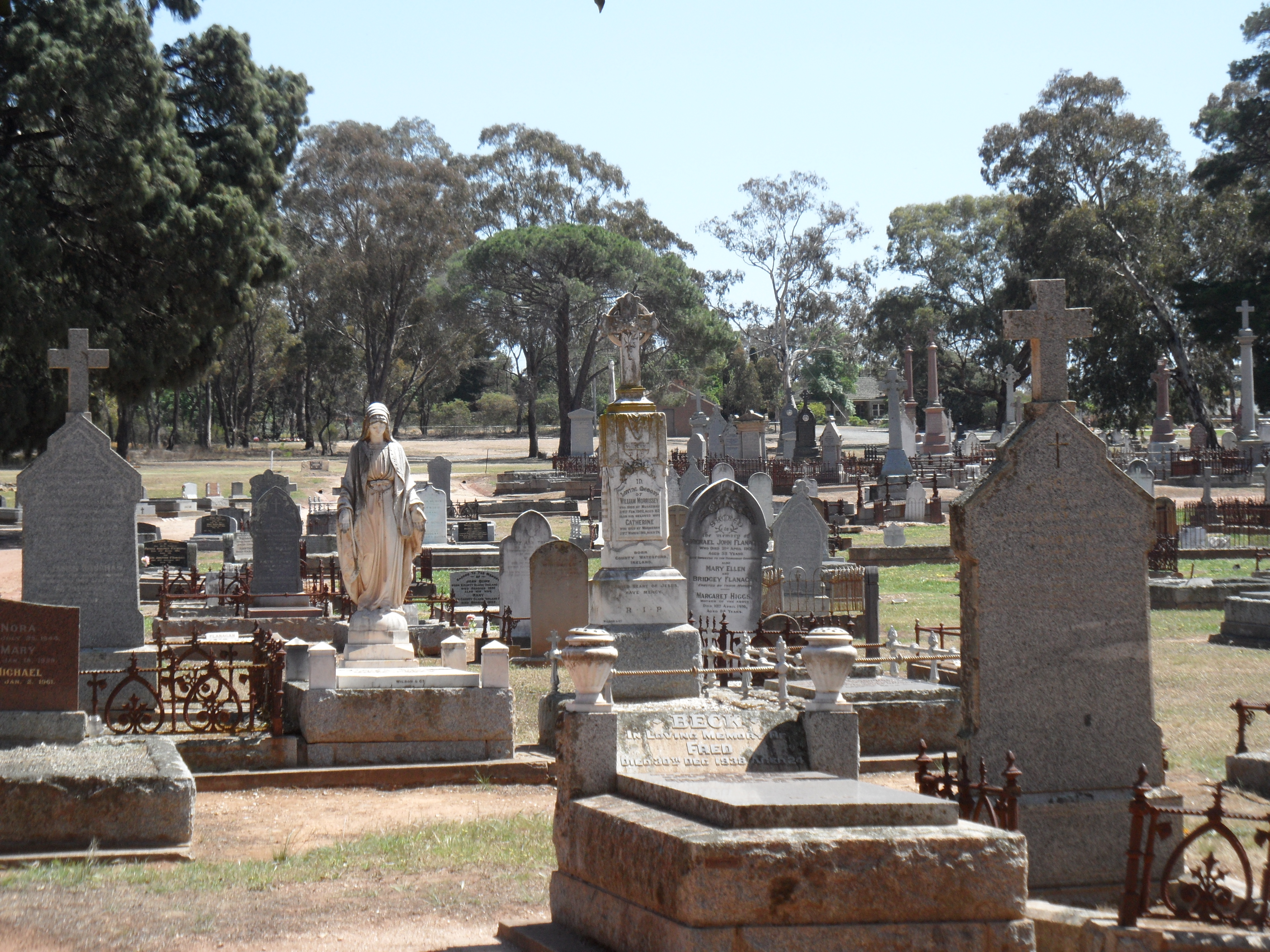
White Hills Cemetery Section E3

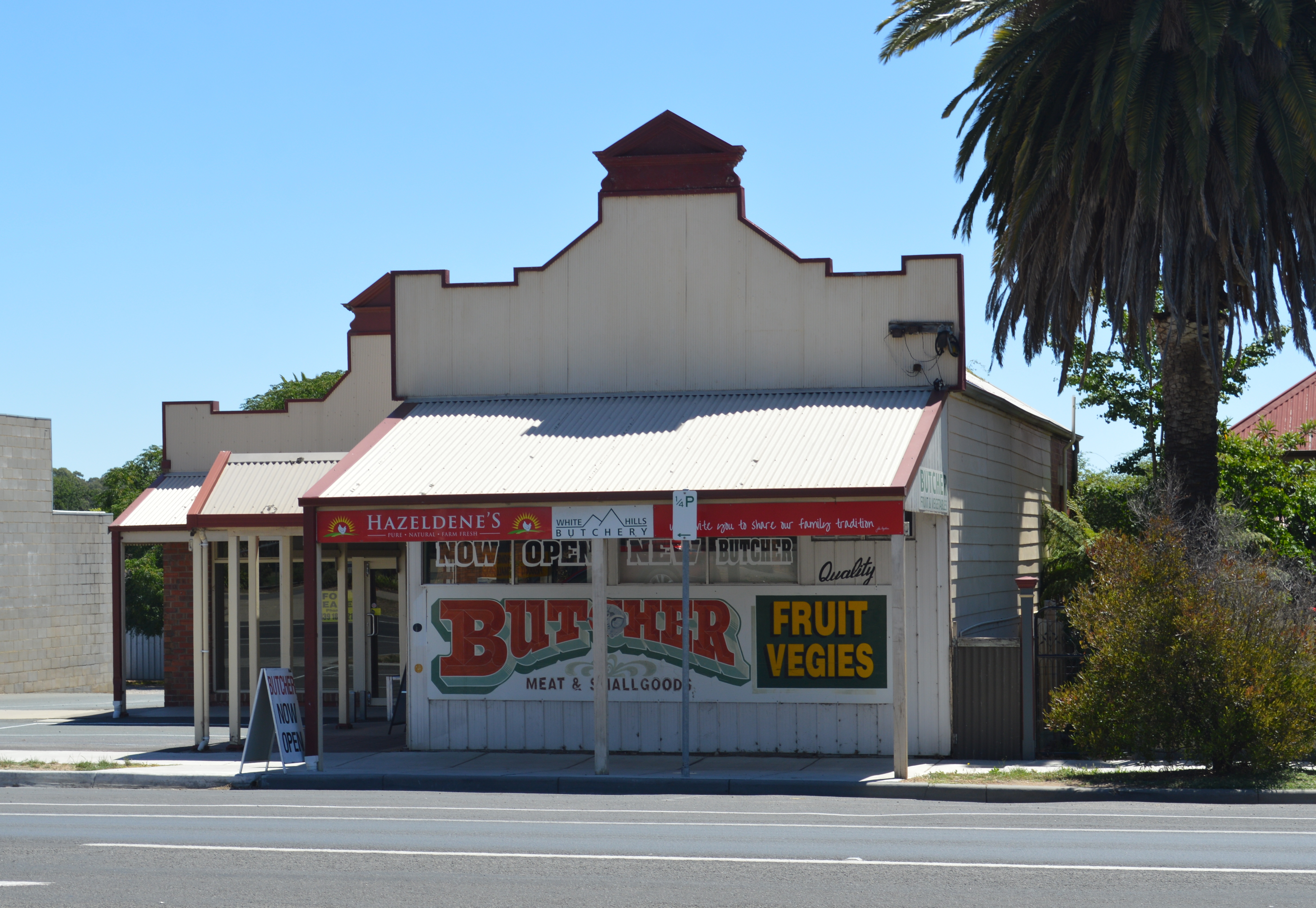
White Hills' butcher's shop

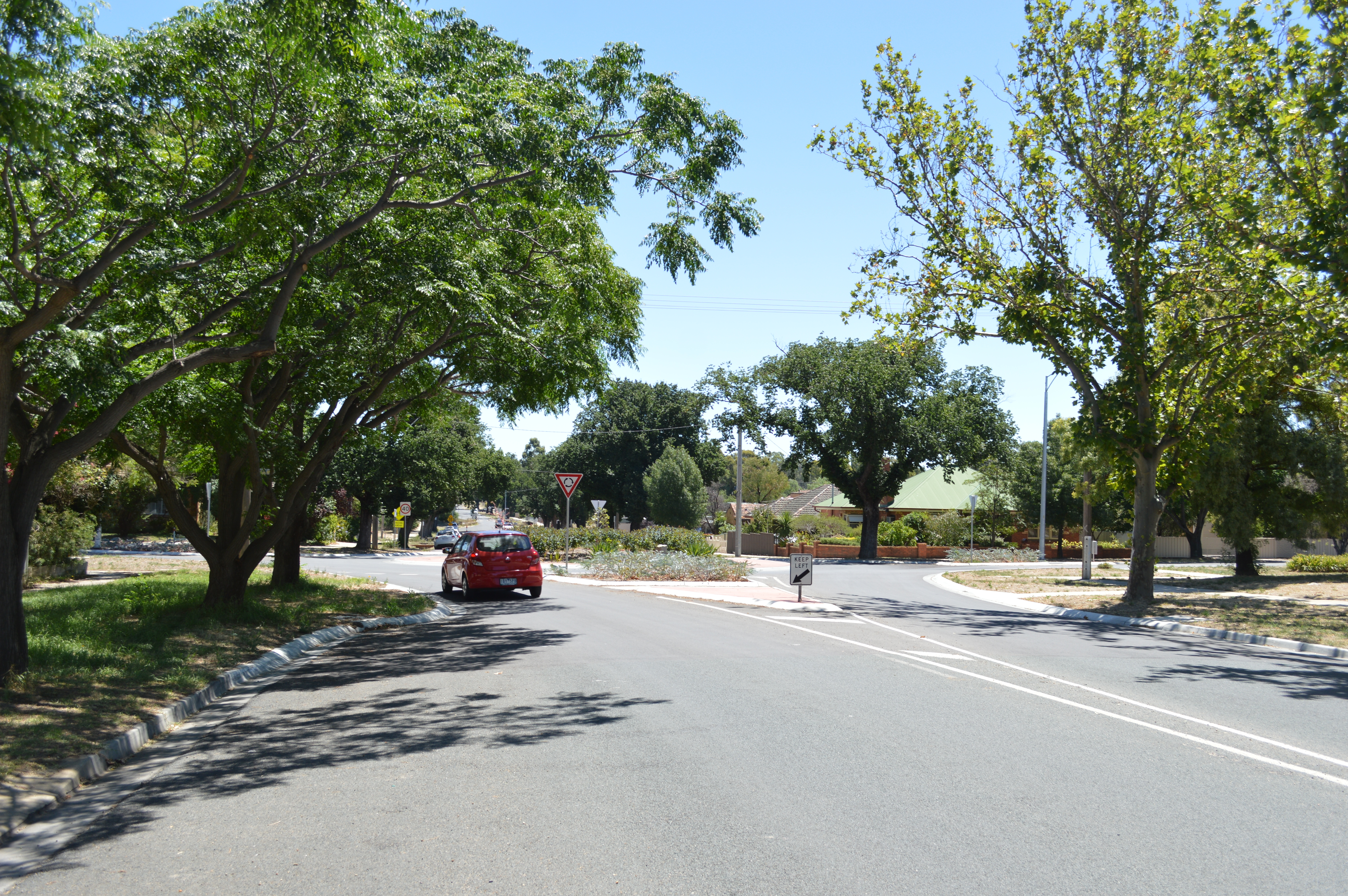
Plumridge Street White Hills
