= Knowsley, Victoria =

Knowsley Bendigo, Victoria
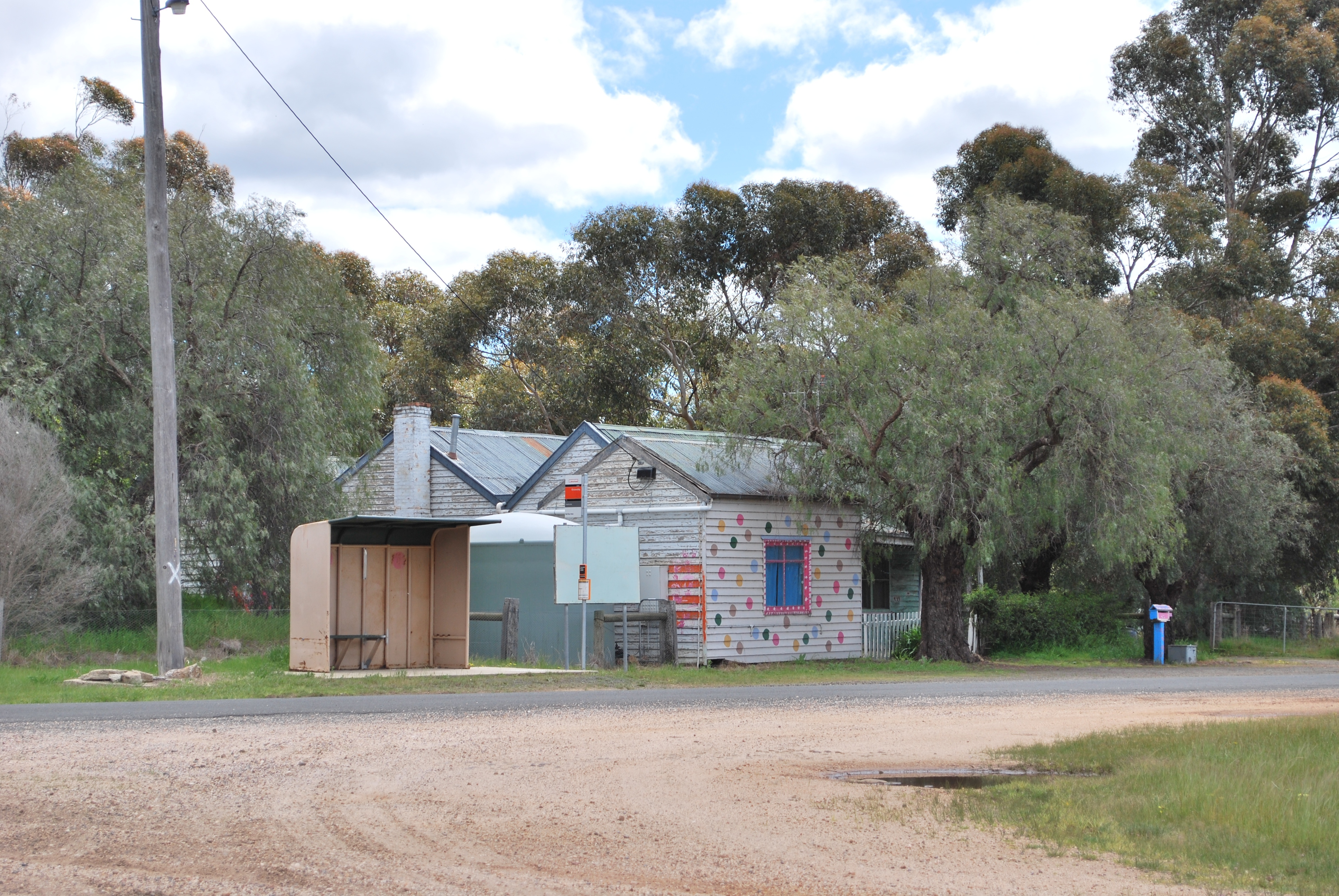
- Bus stop at Knowsley, 2012

- Coordinates: 36°49′35″S 144°35′15″E
- Population: 168 (2021 census)
- Postcode(s): 3523, 3551
- Location: 134 km (83 mi) N of Melbourne; 31 km (19 mi) E of Bendigo; 15 km (9 mi) NW of Heathcote
- LGA(s): City of Greater Bendigo
- State electorate(s): Euroa
- Federal division(s): Bendigo

Knowsley is a locality in the City of Greater Bendigo, Victoria. It is located 134 kilometres (83 mi) north of the state capital, Melbourne. Knowsley is named after the town of Knowsley in Merseyside, England. At the 2021 census, Knowsley had a population of 168.

== History ==
Knowsley began to develop in 1876 with the opening of the Moorabbee Hotel, followed by a school in 1879. Its early economy relied on timber cutting, particularly firewood, which was transported to Bendigo. In 1888, Knowsley became a station on the railway line connecting Bendigo, Heathcote and Heathcote Junction. The station closed in 1958.

As the forests were cleared, the land transitioned to grazing. By 1933, Knowsley was a small farming and grazing township with a school, church, recreation hall, and hotel, supporting a population of around 150. Over time, the population declined, and the school, which had only seven students in 1981, closed in 1991.
