= Toolleen =

Toolleen Bendigo, Victoria
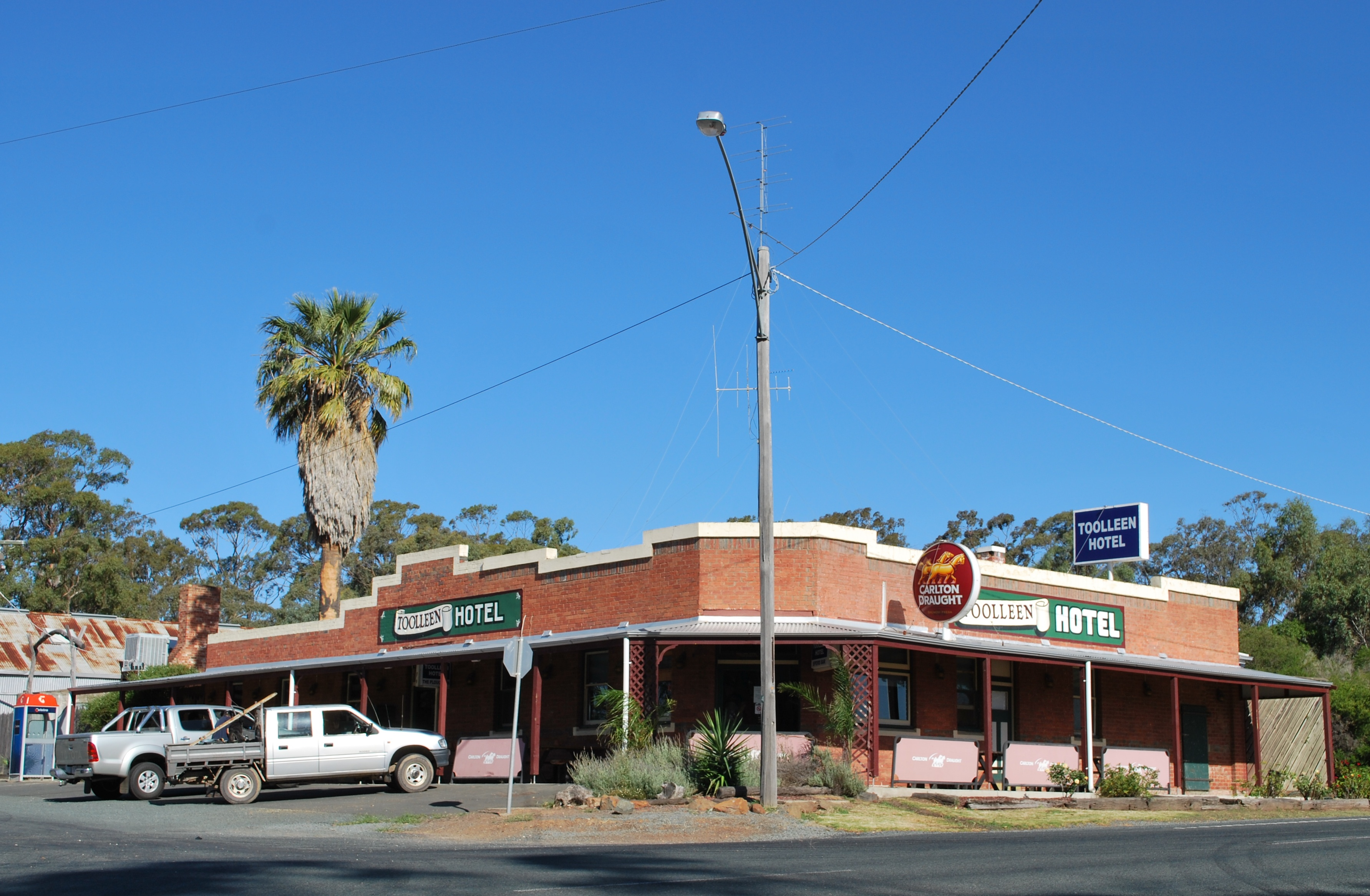
- Toolleen Hotel

- Coordinates: 36°43′16″S 144°41′00″E
- Population: 182 (2016 census)
- Postcode(s): 3551
- Location: 142 km (88 mi) N of Melbourne; 39 km (24 mi) E of Bendigo; 24 km (15 mi) N of Heathcote
- LGA(s): Shire of Campaspe; City of Greater Bendigo
- State electorate(s): Euroa
- Federal division(s): Bendigo; Nicholls

Toolleen is a town in northern Victoria, Australia. The town is on the Northern Highway and is in the Shire of Campaspe and the City of Greater Bendigo local government areas, 142 kilometres (88 mi) north of the state capital, Melbourne. At the 2016 census, Toolleen and the surrounding area had a population of 182.

== History ==
Toolleen is derived from an Aboriginal word 'toolaam' meaning 'tongue'. During the Victorian Gold Rush and after the discovery of gold at nearby Rushworth, Toolleen was a busy intersection where the roads linking Bendigo, Beechworth, Melbourne and the Murray River port of Echuca crossed.

Toolleen Post Office opened on 12 July 1872.

The town is now mainly an agricultural region, with wine grape growing becoming more popular.
