= Colbinabbin Football Club =

Australian Rules Football club

Names
- Full name: Colbinabbin Football & Netball Club
- Nickname(s): Grasshoppers

2024 season
- After finals: 5th, defeated by Heathcote in the Elimination Final
- Home-and-away season: 5th
- Leading goalkicker: Alex Carr (37)
- Best and fairest: Nathan Basile

Club details
- Founded: 1915; 110 years ago
- Colours: Green Gold
- Competition: HDFL
- Premierships: HDFL (12) 1939, 1949, 1950, 1975, 1978, 1991, 1998, 1999, 2002, 2003, 2004, 2008
- Ground(s): MJ Morgan Reserve, Colbinabbin

Other information
- Official website: ColbinabbinFNC

The Colbinabbin Football Club is an Australian Rules Football club which competes in the Heathcote District Football League (HDFL).

The club, known as the Colbinabbin Grasshoppers, is based in Colbinabbin, Victoria and has participated in the HDFL since 1935.

The Grasshoppers have appeared in 23 grand finals, winning twelve; the most recent in 2008.

== Location ==
Shire of Campaspe
Location of Colbinabbin (Victoria)

== History ==
=== Successful Years (1998 – 2008) ===
Colbinabbin hadn't won a flag in seven years and prior hadn't won a flag in thirteen years and weren't in the Finals very often. Success was scarce and would only come around every now and then for the Grasshoppers however this changed after back to back Premiership wins in '98 & '99. Soon after their successive back to back Premiership wins they were back again this time winning three flags in a row ('02, '03, '04) and then becoming the second most premiership wins in the HDFL only after Mount Pleasant with 20.

=== The Rebuild (2009 – present) ===
Since 2009 Colbinabbin have appeared in one Grand Final, losing to North Bendigo by 36 points. Despite this they have a very talented team and are in the finals consistently.

== Rivalries ==
Because of the small sized football league rivalries are few and far between and most teams aren't overly aggressive towards another team, however Colbinabbins main rivals are Mount Pleasant and Elmore.

== Honours ==
HDFL

Premierships

Year	Winner	Runner-up	Score
1939	Colbinabbin		
1949	Colbinabbin		
1950	Colbinabbin		
1975	Colbinabbin	Rushworth	87 – 73
1978	Colbinabbin	Stanhope	132 – 117
1991	Colbinabbin	Heathcote	101 - 75
1998	Colbinabbin	North Bendigo	85 – 27
1999	Colbinabbin	Mount Pleasant	50 – 30
2002	Colbinabbin	Lockington Bamawm United	100 – 75
2003	Colbinabbin	Broadford	133 – 102
2004	Colbinabbin	White Hills	40 – 21
2008	Colbinabbin	Heathcote	105 – 83

== Books ==
- History of Football in the Bendigo District – John Stoward – ISBN 978-0-9805929-1-7
