= Heathcote Football Club =

Names
- Full name: Heathcote Football & Netball Club
- Nickname: Saints

2025 season
- After finals: DNQ
- Home-and-away season: 8th

Club details
- Founded: 1967; 59 years ago
- Colours: Red white black
- Competition: HDFL
- Premierships: HDFL (7) 1970, 1972, 1982, 1989, 1992, 2009, 2010
- Ground: Pigeon Park, Heathcote

Other information
- Official website: HeathcoteFNC

The Heathcote Football Club is an Australian Rules Football club which competes in the HDFL.

The club, known as the Heathcote Saints, is based in Heathcote, Victoria and has participated in the HDFL since 1967. The club is a result of a merger between two former Heathcote based teams, Heathcote North & Heathcote Rovers.

The Saints have appeared in 16 grand finals, winning seven; the most recent in 2010.

== Location ==
Heathcote (Greater Bendigo)

== History ==
=== Formation years (1967 – 1972) ===
A Heathcote Football Club was in existence as early as 1905, when it was a founder member of the Heathcote District Football Association. In 1922 the club split to form Heathcote North and Heathcote South.

Due to the effects of the great depression, in 1934 the two Heathcote clubs were re-organised into three (Dons, McIvors and Ramblers). In 1935 the re-org was reversed when three towns returned to the competition.

The present day Heathcote Football Club came into existence in 1967 when Heathcote North and Heathcote Rovers merged. Combining the red and white colours of the former club with the black and white of the latter, Heathcote not surprisingly adopted the Saints emblem.

Both North and Rovers had achieved considerable success prior to the merger. North's tally of eight senior HDFL premierships included a competition record five in succession between 1955 and 1959, while Rovers, with nine senior flags, had done even better overall. Given this impeccable pedigree there seemed little doubt that the Heathcote Football Club would make its mark on the competition sooner rather than later, and so it proved. In 1967 the seniors reached the grand final, where they lost to Mount Pleasant. A measure of consolation came in the form of Warren Elsbury's Cheatley Medal win.

The club's first premiership was claimed in 1970 via a grand final defeat of Elmore. Another grand final loss to Mount Pleasant then followed before the Saints again went top in 1972, this time at the expense of Colbinabbin.

=== The Successful Years (1989 – 1995) ===
The Saints' most successful phase to date came from the late 1980s through into the 1990s when they contested half a dozen consecutive grand finals, winning flags in 1989 and 1992. The 1989 grand final triumph was especially noteworthy in that Heathcote trounced Stanhope by almost 100 points, 24.15 (159) to 9.7 (61).

=== The Dark Years (1998 – 2004) ===
The period from the late 1990s to the early - mid 2000s was almost polar opposite to that of the previous decade. The Saints senior side struggled year after year with only Huntly performing worse during this period. During the period, however, Heathcote had a very strong junior generation (HDFL U/17'S premiers 2004 - 05) coming through which were to lay the foundations for future success.

=== Return to the Top (2008 – 2012) ===
Heathcote made a return to the HDFL finals in 2005 - 07. On the back of a strong generation of juniors coming through to the senior ranks as well as some shrewd recruiting, 2008 shaped as the year Heathcote returned to their rightful place as an HDFL powerhouse. 2008 saw Heathcote finish 3rd on the ladder, however, it made it through to its first grand final in 13 years, despite leading at 3/4 time the Saints eventually lost to Colbinabbin by 22 points.

The 2009 season saw the Saints finish second on the Home & Away ladder to Colbinabbin. After defeating Colbinabbin in the semi-final, Heathcote qualified directly for the grand final. The following week Colbinabbin beat LBU which set up a replay of the 2008 grand final. The 2009 grand final was a close fought match all day with Heathcote gaining revenge on Colbinabbin by four points. Thus winning their first premiership in 17 seasons.

A change of coach for the 2010 season proved no bad as Heathcote finished Minor premiers and had also won the Premiership. It was one of Heathcote's best ever seasons as they went flawless winning all 18 games that season. 16 in the regular season and two in the finals, the closest margin of course in the Grand final to LBU. The Saints beat LBU in an extremely wet, muddy, and dirty grand final at Colbinabbin 8.8 (56) – 5.9 (39). Heathcote Saints, for the first time, had won back to back premierships. The Saints also won the reserve premiership in 2010, claiming the trophy for the first time in 37 years.

2011 was another successful year for Heathcote finishing second on the H&A ladder. The Saints qualified for their fourth consecutive grand final but much as Heathcote had done to Colbinabbin in 2009, LBU beat Heathcote in a thriller 99 - 93.

2012 began promising for Heathcote but towards the end of the season the Saints appeared to has lost their air of invincibility. Heathcote qualified for the finals but bowed out in prelim to North Bendigo.

=== The Rebuild (2013 – 2021) ===
After the 2012 prelim final loss to North Bendigo the Saints went through a complete overhaul of staff & players. The 2013 season started with the Saints losing 5 of their first 6 however, the rebuild appeared to be a fast tracked as Heathcote gained momentum throughout the season and qualified for the 2013 finals with a 9 - 7 record; good enough for 4th on the ladder. After beating Leitchville Gunbower by two points in the Elimination final, Heathcote was knocked out by North Bendigo for the second year running.

From 2014 to 2021, Heathcote Football Club experienced a challenging period on-field. Across these seven seasons, the club recorded just 14 total wins and went through three senior head coaches. The senior team’s best finish during this time was 7th place, and they missed finals in all seven seasons.

Despite struggles at senior level, there was a positive highlight in 2016, when the reserves team reached the grand final, showing some depth and potential within the club.

=== Return To Finals (2022 – Present) ===
A new era began for the Heathcote Football Club in 2022 with the appointment of head coach Andrew Saladino, who brought fresh energy and belief back to the club. That season, Heathcote finished with a respectable 7–9 record, placing 6th, just one game outside finals. Their season ended heartbreakingly in a do-or-die Round 16 loss to White Hills by 7 points, with White Hills going on to finish 5th.

In 2023, the club reached new heights, breaking a 10-year finals drought by finishing minor premiers with a 13–3 record. Heathcote advanced to the grand final, chasing an even longer 13-year premiership drought. Entering as heavy favourites and kicking the first three goals, the team ultimately fell short, losing the grand final by 19 points to Mount Pleasant.

The momentum continued in 2024, with another finals appearance and a 4th-place finish (9–7 record). However, their finals campaign ended in controversy, with a semi-final against Leitchville Gunbower called off due to extreme weather, Heathcote trailing by just 2 points in what became one of the most talked-about games of the year.

2025 proved a setback, as the club slid back down the ladder, finishing 8th with a 3–13 record. Despite the tough year, there was a major positive: the emergence of youth, with seven Under-18 players making their senior debuts, all contributing to the club’s wins.

Looking ahead, 2026 and beyond holds strong promise. With smart recruiting, a growing young core, and renewed belief, Heathcote appears well placed to launch another genuine premiership push, signalling a hopeful future for the club.

== Rivalries ==
Due to the small league size and close proximity of teams, rivalries are plentiful in the HDFL. The Saints traditional rivals are Mount Pleasant, Colbinabbin & Elmore. Due to clashing dominant eras of the mid 2000s to mid 2010s, Heathcote and LBU became fierce rivals.

Heathcote & Mount Pleasant play off each year for the Peter & Cliff White Memorial Shield.

== Honours ==
HDFL

Premierships & Grand Finals

Year	Winner	Runner up	Score
1970	Heathcote	Elmore	61 – 60
1972	Heathcote	Colbinabbin	117 – 86
1982	Heathcote	Mt Pleasant	135 – 76
1989	Heathcote	Stanhope	159 – 61
1992	Heathcote	Mt Pleasant	104 – 86
2009	Heathcote	Colbinabbin	107 – 103
2010	Heathcote	LBU	56 – 39

== Books ==
- History of Football in the Bendigo District – John Stoward – ISBN 978-0-9805929-1-7
