= North Bendigo =

North Bendigo Bendigo, Victoria
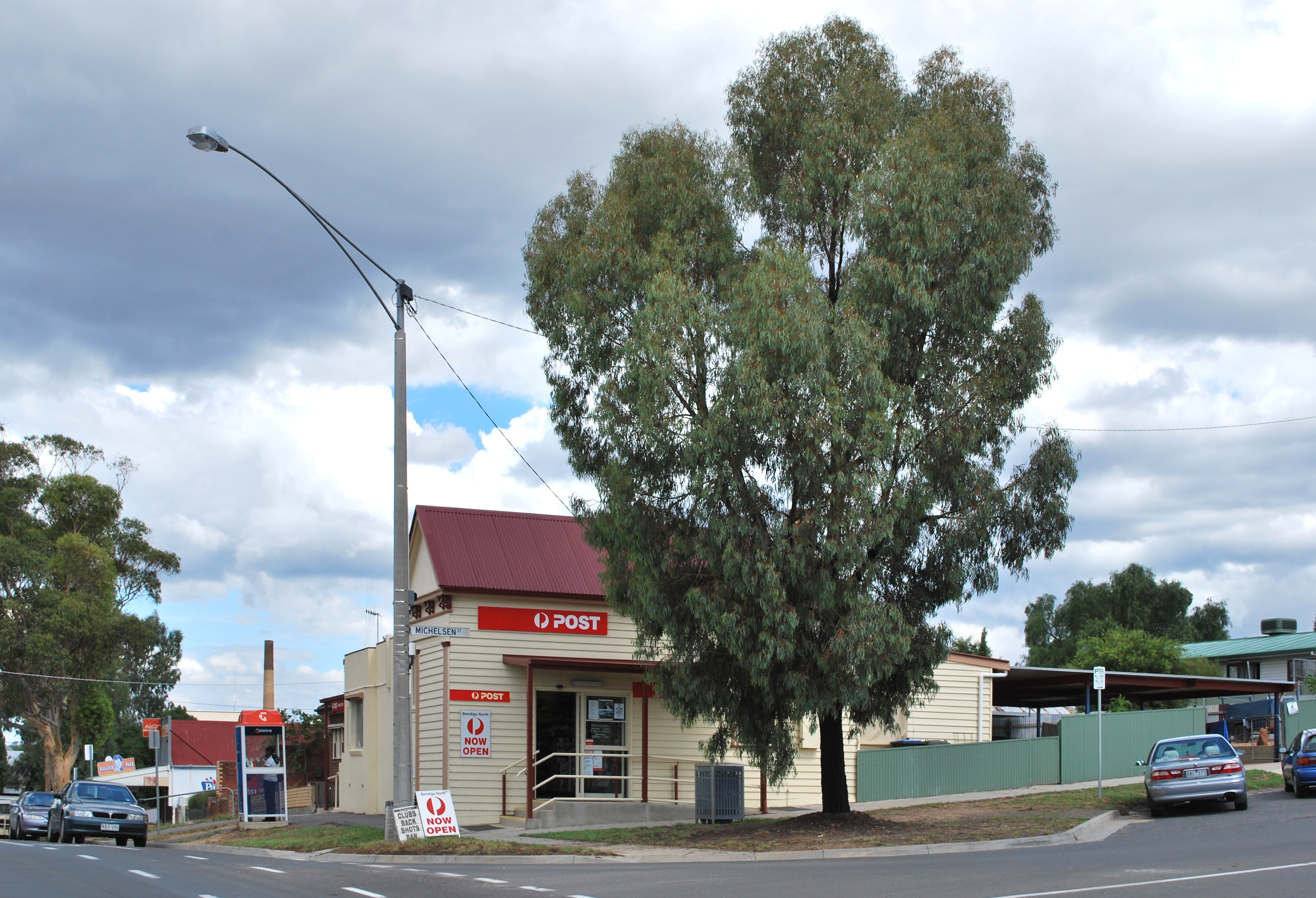
- North Bendigo Post Office

- Coordinates: 36°44′0″S 144°16′0″E
- Population: 3,953 (2011 census)
- Postcode(s): 3550
- Location: 2.4 km (1 mi) N of Bendigo
- LGA(s): City of Greater Bendigo
- State electorate(s): Bendigo West
- Federal division(s): Bendigo

North Bendigo is a suburb of the city of Bendigo in central Victoria, Australia. North Bendigo is in the City of Greater Bendigo, 2.4 kilometres (1.5 mi) north of the Bendigo central business district. At the 2011 census, North Bendigo had a population of 3,953.

== History ==
A section of North Bendigo was formally known as "Emu Point" which had a large community of Chinese miners who built the Bendigo Joss house around 1865.
