= Elmore Football Club =

Australian Rules football club

Names
- Full name: Elmore Football & Netball Club
- Nickname: Bloods

2017 season
- After finals: DNQ
- Home-and-away season: 8th

Club details
- Founded: 1882; 144 years ago
- Colours: Red White
- Competition: HDFL
- Premierships: HDFL (5) 1954, 1960, 1963, 1985, 2007
- Ground: Elmore Recreation Reserve, Elmore

Other information
- Official website: ElmoreFNC

The Elmore Football Club is an Australian Rules Football club which competes in the Heathcote District Football League (HDFL). The club, known as the Elmore Bloods, is based in Elmore, Victoria and has participated in the HDFL since 1949. The Bloods have appeared in 14 grand finals, winning five; the most recent in 2007.

== Location ==
Greater Bendigo

== History ==
The Elmore Football Club was formed at Scotts Railway Hotel from a meeting on the April 15, 1882. The original colours chosen were red, white and blue.

== Between the wars (1919-1948) ==
Elmore is situated on the Bendigo to Deniliquin railway line. It was also the start of the Elmore to Cohuna branch line. The club had mobility to play anywhere competition in the surrounding area.

- Elmore DFA - (1919–1920)
- Rochester FA - (1921–1922)
- Elmore and Cohuna FL - (1923–1925)
- Bendigo Junior Association - (1926)
- Neilborough FA - (1927–1929)
- Recess (1930–1931)
- Echuca FL - (1932–1935)
- Midland United FA - (1936)
- Lockington FA - (1937)
- Heathcote DFL - (1938–1939)
- Echuca FL - (1944–45)
- Bendigo FL - (1946)
- Echuca FL (1947–1948)

=== HDFL (1949 – ) ===
In 1949 Elmore returned to the Heathcote District FL. they had participated in 1938 and 1939 but dropped out because of the war. Elmore have won five premierships, all have come in long-awaited years because they have been Runners-up more than they have been Premiers. They have been very unlucky in the past having been Runners-up eight times and been Premiers six times and before the 2007 Premiership they were in a flag drought of twenty two consecutive years, which is the third biggest flag drought in the HDFL after Colbinabbin's (22 years) 1950–1975 flag drought and White Hills (29 years) 1988–Present flag drought.

== Rivalries ==
Because of the small sized football league rivalries are few and far between and most teams aren't overly aggressive towards another team, however Elmore's main rivals are Colbinabbin, Huntly, Mount Pleasant & Heathcote

== Honours ==
HDFL

Premierships & Grand Finals

Year	Winner	Runner-up	Score
1954	Elmore	Toobarac	15.9.99 – 7.18.60
1960	Elmore	Mount Pleasant	12.17.89 – 9.12.66
1963	Elmore	Toobarac	9.16.70 – 7.11.55
1985	Elmore	Heathcote	14.17.101 – 10.10.70
2007	Elmore	Colbinabbin	26.29.185 – 12.14.86

== Books ==
- History of Football in the Bendigo District – John Stoward – ISBN 978-0-9805929-1-7
