= Results of the 2024 Victorian local elections in Loddon Mallee =

2024 Victorian local elections (Loddon Mallee)
- October 2024

This is a list of results for the 2024 Victorian local elections in the Loddon Mallee region.

Loddon Mallee has a population of around 350,000 and covers ten local government areas (LGAs), including the City of Greater Bendigo.

== Buloke ==
2024 Buloke Shire Council election
- October 2024

All 6 seats on Buloke Shire Council 4 seats needed for a majority
- 2024 ward boundaries. Expand the map and click on a ward to see the ward name
Largest party before election
Independents
Subsequent largest party
Independents

Buloke Shire Council is composed of three multi-member wards with two members each. The council decreased from seven members to six prior to the 2024 election; councillors were previously elected across two two-member wards and one three-member ward.

=== Buloke results ===
2024 Victorian local elections: Buloke
Party	Votes	%	Swing	Seats	Change
Independent	2,589	100.00	0.00	6	Steady
Formal votes	2,589	98.18			
Informal votes	48	1.82			
Total	2,637	100.00			
Registered voters / turnout	3,085	85.48			

=== Lower Avoca ===
2024 Victorian local elections: Lower Avoca Ward
Party	Candidate	Votes	%	±%
Independent	Bruce Stafford (elected 1)	874	66.72	
Independent	Stephen Barratt (elected 2)	295	22.52	
Independent	Kevin Thomas O'Dea	141	10.76	
Total formal votes		1,310	97.47	
Informal votes		34	2.53	
Turnout		1,344	85.61	

=== Mallee ===
2024 Victorian local elections: Mallee Ward
Party	Candidate	Votes	%	±%
Independent	Bernadette Hogan (elected)	unopposed		
Independent	Alan Ronald Getley (elected)	unopposed		
Registered electors		1,728		

=== Mount Jeffcott ===
2024 Victorian local elections: Mount Jeffcott Ward
Party	Candidate	Votes	%	±%
Independent	Graeme Leon Milne (elected 1)	643	50.27	
Independent	Charmaine Delaney (elected 2)	354	27.68	
Independent	Daryl Warren	282	22.05	
Total formal votes		1,279	98.92	
Informal votes		14	1.08	
Turnout		1,293	85.35	

== Campaspe ==
2024 Campaspe Shire Council election
- October 2024

All 9 seats on Campaspe Shire Council 5 seats needed for a majority
- Registered: 29,734
- Turnout: 81.46% (▼0.44)
	First party	Second party	Third party
	IND	IND
Party	Independents	Ind. National	Greens
Last election	8 seats	1 seat	Did not contest
Seats before	8	1	0
Seats won	7	1	1
Seat change	▼1	Steady	▲1
First preference vote	16,766	4,661	1,501
Percentage	73.13%	20.32%	6.55%
Swing			▲6.55
Largest party before election
Independents
Subsequent largest party
Independents

Campaspe Shire Council is composed of one multi-member ward electing nine councillors. Prior to the 2024 election, it was composed of five wards (three single-member and two three-member), but the electoral structure has changed as a result of the Local Government Act 2020.

=== Campaspe results ===
2024 Victorian local elections: Campaspe
Party	Candidate	Votes	%	±%
Independent National	Rob Amos (elected 1)	3,194	13.93	−6.07 (Note: Compared to results in Echuca Ward at the 2020 election.)
Independent	Jessica Mitchell (elected 2)	3,160	13.78	+13.78
Independent	Paul Jarman (elected 3)	2,484	10.83	−43.71 (Note: Compared to results in Rochester Ward at the 2020 election.)
Independent	John Zobec (elected 4)	2,265	9.88	−10.90 (Note: Compared to results in Kyabram–Deakin Ward at the 2020 election.)
Independent	Luke Sharrock (elected 5)	2,046	8.92	+8.92
Independent	Adrian Weston (elected 7)	1,761	7.68	−92.32 (Note: Compared to results in Waranga Ward at the 2020 election.)
Independent	Tony Marwood (elected 6)	1,714	7.48	−14.51
Independent	Daniel Mackrell (elected 8)	1,517	6.62	−23.61
Greens	Zoe Cook (elected 9)	1,501	6.55	+6.55
Independent National	Michael Farrant	1,467	6.40	+6.40
Independent	Deb Chumbley	1,329	5.80	+5.80
Independent	Brett Ould	490	2.14	+2.14
Total formal votes		22,928	94.66	−2.37
Informal votes		1,293	5.34	+2.37
Turnout		24,221	81.46	−0.44

== Central Goldfields ==
2024 Central Goldfields Shire Council election
- October 2024

All 7 seats on Central Goldfields Shire Council 4 seats needed for a majority
- 2024 ward boundaries. Expand the map and click on a ward to see the ward name
Largest party before election
Independents
Subsequent largest party
Independents

Central Goldfields Shire Council is composed of seven single-member wards. Prior to the 2024 election, it was composed of four wards (three single-member and one four-member), but the electoral structure has changed as a result of the Local Government Act 2020.

=== Central Goldfields results ===
2024 Victorian local elections: Central Goldfields
Party	Votes	%	Seats	Change
Independents	6,021	100.00	7	Steady
Formal votes	6,021	95.75		
Informal votes	267	4.25		
Total	6,288		7	
Registered voters	10,886			

=== Flynn ===
2024 Victorian local elections: Flynn Ward
Party	Candidate	Votes	%	±%
Independent	Liesbeth Long	690	58.72	–9.84
Independent	Raymond Sexton	485	41.28	
Total formal votes		1,175	94.91	
Informal votes		63	5.09	
Turnout		1,238	82.64	
Independent hold		Swing	–9.84	

=== Maryborough Central ===
2024 Victorian local elections: Maryborough Central Ward
Party	Candidate	Votes	%	±%
Independent	Gerard Michael Murphy	935	72.88	
Independent	Lowen Clarke	348	27.12	
Total formal votes		1,283	96.10	
Informal votes		52	3.90	
Turnout		1,335	82.56	
Independent win		(new ward)		

=== Maryborough East ===
2024 Victorian local elections: Maryborough East Ward
Party	Candidate	Votes	%	±%
Independent	Jacob Meyer	581	52.25	
Independent	Trevor Stevens	531	47.75	
Total formal votes		1,112	94.64	
Informal votes		63	5.36	
Turnout		1,175	76.40	
Independent win		(new ward)		

=== Maryborough North ===
2024 Victorian local elections: Maryborough North Ward
Party	Candidate	Votes	%	±%
Independent	Geoff Bartlett	778	61.26	
Independent	Wayne Sproull	492	38.74	
Total formal votes		1,270	96.21	
Informal votes		50	3.79	
Turnout		1,320	84.40	
Independent win		(new ward)		

=== Maryborough West ===
2024 Victorian local elections: Maryborough West Ward
Party	Candidate	Votes	%	±%
Independent	Grace La Vella	unopposed		
Registered electors		1,644		
Independent win		(new ward)		

=== Paddys Ranges ===
2024 Victorian local elections: Paddys Ranges Ward
Party	Candidate	Votes	%	±%
Independent	Chris Meddows-Taylor	485	41.07	
Independent	Ben Green	484	40.98	
Independent	Gregory Thomas Corcoran	212	17.95	
Total formal votes		1,181	96.80	
Informal votes		39	3.20	
Turnout		1,220	83.22	
Two-candidate-preferred result
Independent	Ben Green	610	51.65	
Independent	Chris Meddows-Taylor	571	48.35	
Independent gain from Independent		Swing	N/A	

=== Tullaroop ===
2024 Victorian local elections: Tullaroop Ward
Party	Candidate	Votes	%	±%
Independent	Anna De Villiers	unopposed		
Registered electors		1,559		
Independent win		Swing	N/A	

== Gannawarra ==
2024 Gannawarra Shire Council election
- October 2024

All 7 seats on Gannawarra Shire Council 4 seats needed for a majority
Largest party before election
Independents
Subsequent largest party
TBD

Gannawarra Shire Council is composed of one multi-member ward electing seven councillors. Prior to the 2024 election, it was composed of four wards (two single-member, one two-member and one three-member), but the electoral structure has changed as a result of the Local Government Act 2020.

=== Gannawarra results ===
2024 Victorian local elections: Gannawarra
Party	Candidate	Votes	%	±%
Independent	Lisa Farrant (elected 1)	1,874	27.57	
Independent	Garner J. Smith (elected 2)	1,141	16.79	
Independent	Ross Stanton (elected 4)	746	10.98	
Independent	Charles Gillingham (elected 6)	621	9.14	
Independent	Pat Quinn (elected 5)	578	8.50	
Independent	Travis Collier	469	6.90	
Independent	Daniel Bolitho (elected 3)	458	6.74	
Independent	Keith Harold Link (elected 7)	355	5.22	
Independent	Robert Jarman	286	4.21	
Independent	Noel Collins	179	2.63	
Independent	Anthony L. Troy	90	1.32	
Total formal votes		6,797	96.68	
Informal votes		233	3.31	
Turnout		7,030	84.16	

== Greater Bendigo ==
2024 Greater Bendigo City Council election
- October 2024

All 9 seats on Greater Bendigo City Council 5 seats needed for a majority
	First party	Second party
	IND	IND
Party	Independents	Ind. Labor
Seats before	7	0
Seats won	5	2
Seat change	▼2	▲2
First preference vote	45,859	7,350
Percentage	71.67%	11.49%
	Third party	Fourth party
	VS	IND
Party	Socialists	Ind. Liberal
Seats before	0	1
Seats won	1	1
Seat change	▲1	Steady
First preference vote	3,387	3,101
Percentage	5.29%	4.85%
- Results by ward for the City of Greater Bendigo.
Largest party before election
Independents
Largest party after election
Independents

Greater Bendigo City Council is composed of nine single-member wards. Prior to the 2024 election, it was composed of three multi-member wards with three members each, but the electoral structure has changed as a result of the Local Government Act 2020.

Epsom Ward was uncontested.

=== Greater Bendigo results ===
2024 Victorian local elections: Greater Bendigo
Party	Votes	%	Seats	Change
Independents	45,859	71.67	5	▼2
Independent Labor	7,350	11.49	2	▲2
Victorian Socialists	3,387	5.29	1	▲1
Greens	3,294	5.15	0	Steady
Independent Liberal	3,101	4.85	1	Steady
Ind. Legalise Cannabis	996	1.56	0	Steady
Formal votes	63,987	96.28		
Informal votes	2,469	3.72		
Total	66,456	100.00	9	Steady
Registered voters	91,672			

=== Axedale ===
2024 Victorian local elections: Axedale Ward
Party	Candidate	Votes	%	±%
Independent Liberal	Shivali Chatley	3,101	36.90	
Independent	Rob Stephenson	2,027	24.12	
Independent	Colin Carrington (Note: Also a member of a political party "that is not Labor, the Liberals or the Nationals".)	1,979	23.55	
Independent	Alida Robinson	1,296	15.42	
Total formal votes		8,403	97.71	
Informal votes		197	2.29	
Turnout		8,600	86.98	
Two-candidate-preferred result
Independent Liberal	Shivali Chatley	4,839	57.59	
Independent	Rob Stephenson	3,564	42.41	
Independent Liberal win		(new ward)		

=== Eppalock ===
2024 Victorian local elections: Eppalock Ward
Party	Candidate	Votes	%	±%
Independent	Aaron Spong	5,727	69.87	
Independent	Dean Farrell	2,470	30.13	
Total formal votes		8,197	95.54	
Informal votes		383	4.46	
Turnout		8,580	80.49	
Independent win		(new ward)		

=== Epsom ===
2024 Victorian local elections: Epsom Ward
Party	Candidate	Votes	%	±%
Independent	Andrea Metcalf	unopposed		
Registered electors		9,631		
Independent win		(new ward)		

=== Golden Square ===
2024 Victorian local elections: Golden Square Ward
Party	Candidate	Votes	%	±%
Independent	Karen Corr	3,085	39.46	
Independent	Matthew Dwyer	1,778	22.74	
Independent	Vaughan Williams	1,650	21.11	
Independent	Maryann Martinek	1,305	16.69	
Total formal votes		7,818	96.99	
Informal votes		243	3.01	
Turnout		8,061	79.73	
Two-candidate-preferred result
Independent	Karen Corr	4,771	61.03	
Independent	Vaughan Williams	3,047	38.97	
Independent win		(new ward)		

=== Kennington ===
2024 Victorian local elections: Kennington Ward
Party	Candidate	Votes	%	±%
Independent Labor	Abhishek Awasthi	4,713	58.86	
Greens	Gavin Hicks	3,294	41.14	
Total formal votes		8,007	95.70	
Informal votes		360	4.30	
Turnout		8,367	81.25	
Independent Labor win		(new ward)		

=== Lake Weeroona ===
2024 Victorian local elections: Lake Weeroona Ward
Party	Candidate	Votes	%	±%
Independent	Thomas Prince	3,889	54.03	
Independent	Luke Martin	3,309	45.97	
Total formal votes		7,198	94.92	
Informal votes		385	5.08	
Turnout		7,583	77.02	
Independent win		(new ward)		

=== Lockwood ===
2024 Victorian local elections: Lockwood Ward
Party	Candidate	Votes	%	±%
Independent	John McIlrath	4,753	59.23	
Independent	Jay Brady	3,271	40.77	
Total formal votes		8,024	95.24	
Informal votes		401	4.76	
Turnout		8,425	81.91	
Independent win		(new ward)		

==== March 2026 Lockwood Ward by-election ====
March 2026 Lockwood Ward by-election (6–27 March 2026)
Party	Candidate	Votes	%	±%
Independent	Donna Nicholas	1,877	22.70	+22.70
Independent	Colin Carrington	1,541	18.63	+18.63
Independent	Ajay Mishra	1,515	18.32	+18.32
Greens	Robert Holian	1,175	14.21	+14.21
Independent	Vaughan Williams	684	8.27	+8.27
Independent	Emily Edgar	669	8.09	+8.09
Victorian Socialists	Tayne Shalevski	422	5.10	+5.10
Independent	Mary-Ann Martinek	387	4.68	+4.68
Total formal votes		8,269	96.75	+1.51
Informal votes		278	3.25	−1.51
Turnout		8,547	81.14	−0.77
Two-candidate-preferred result
Independent	Donna Nicholas	5,279	63.84	+63.84
Independent	Ajay Mishra	2,990	36.16	+36.16
Independent gain from Independent		Swing	+63.84	

- By-election held after the resignation of sitting councillor John McIlrath.

==== October 2026 Lockwood Ward by-election ====
October 2026 Lockwood Ward by-election (14 September – 2 October 2026)
Party	Candidate	Votes	%	±%
Independent	Ajay Mishra	2,287	26.95	+8.63
Independent	David Thorpe	1,846	21.76	+21.76
Greens	Robert Phillip Holian	1,397	16.46	+2.25
Independent	Emily Edgar	1,251	14.74	+6.65
Independent	MaryAnn Martinek	1,135	13.38	+8.70
Independent	Grant Lockwood	569	6.71	+6.71
Total formal votes		8,485	98.05	+1.30
Informal votes		169	1.95	−1.30
Turnout		8,654	81.53	+0.39
Two-candidate-preferred result
Independent	David Thorpe	4,365	51.44	+51.44
Independent	Ajay Mishra	4,120	48.56	+12.40
Independent gain from Independent		Swing	+51.44	

- By-election held after the death of sitting councillor Donna Nicholas.

=== Ravenswood ===
2024 Victorian local elections: Ravenswood Ward
Party	Candidate	Votes	%	±%
Independent Labor	Damien Hurrell	2,637	32.91	
Independent	Donna Nicholas	2,522	31.47	
Independent	Emma Berglund	1,858	23.19	
Ind. Legalise Cannabis	John Cooper	996	12.43	
Total formal votes		8,013	97.21	
Informal votes		230	2.79	
Turnout		8,243	80.45	
Two-candidate-preferred result
Independent Labor	Damien Hurrell	4,101	51.18	
Independent	Donna Nicholas	3,912	48.82	
Independent Labor win		(new ward)		

=== Whipstick ===
2024 Victorian local elections: Whipstick Ward
Party	Candidate	Votes	%	±%
Victorian Socialists	Owen Cosgriff	3,387	40.67	
Independent	Bevan Madden	2,737	32.87	
Independent	Jan Pagliaro	2,203	26.46	
Total formal votes		8,327	96.86	
Informal votes		270	3.14	
Turnout		8,597	80.29	
Two-candidate-preferred result
Victorian Socialists	Owen Cosgriff	4,387	52.68	
Independent	Bevan Madden	3,940	47.32	
Victorian Socialists win		(new ward)		

== Loddon ==
2024 Loddon Shire Council election
- October 2024

All 5 seats on Loddon Shire Council 3 seats needed for a majority
Largest party before election
Independents
Subsequent largest party
Independents

Loddon Shire Council is composed of five single-member wards.

=== Loddon results ===
2024 Victorian local elections: Loddon
Party	Votes	%	Seats	Change
Independents	2,000	100.00	5	Steady
Formal votes	2,000	97.23		
Informal votes	57	2.77		
Total	2,057	100.00	5	
Registered voters	5,958			

=== Boort ===
2024 Victorian local elections: Boort Ward
Party	Candidate	Votes	%	±%
Independent	David Weaver	unopposed		
Registered electors		1,201		
Independent gain from Independent				

=== Inglewood ===
2024 Victorian local elections: Inglewood Ward
Party	Candidate	Votes	%	±%
Independent	Wendy Murphy	372	35.94	–2.88
Independent	Miki Wilson	369	35.65	+35.65
Independent	Colleen Condliffe	294	28.41	–6.18
Total formal votes		1,035	97.64	–1.20
Informal votes		25	2.36	+1.20
Turnout		1,060	83.79	+0.03
Two-candidate-preferred result
Independent	Miki Wilson	571	55.17	+55.17
Independent	Wendy Murphy	464	44.83	–6.86
Independent gain from Independent				

=== Tarnagulla ===
2024 Victorian local elections: Tarnagulla Ward
Party	Candidate	Votes	%	±%
Independent	Nick Angelo	370	38.34	–0.36
Independent	Linda Jungwirth	366	37.93	–7.72
Independent	Carly Noble	119	12.33	+12.33
Independent	Charmain Sheppard	110	11.40	+11.40
Total formal votes		965	96.79	–1.25
Informal votes		32	3.21	+1.25
Turnout		997	85.87	+1.72
Two-candidate-preferred result
Independent	Nick Angelo	490	50.78	+5.91
Independent	Linda Jungwirth	475	49.22	–5.91
Independent gain from Independent		Swing	+5.91	

=== Terrick ===
2024 Victorian local elections: Terrick Ward
Party	Candidate	Votes	%	±%
Independent	Dan Straub	unopposed		
Registered electors		1,197		
Independent hold				

=== Wedderburn ===
2024 Victorian local elections: Wedderburn Ward
Party	Candidate	Votes	%	±%
Independent	Gavan Lindsay Holt	unopposed		
Registered electors		1,134		
Independent hold				

== Macedon Ranges ==
2024 Macedon Ranges Shire Council election
- October 2024

All 9 seats on Macedon Ranges Shire Council 5 seats needed for a majority
Largest party before election
Independents
Subsequent largest party
TBD

Macedon Ranges Shire Council is composed of three multi-member wards with three members each.

=== Macedon Ranges results ===
2024 Victorian local elections: Macedon Ranges
Party	Votes	%	Swing	Seats	Change
Independent	28,932	90.37		8	Steady
Independent Liberal	3,084	9.63		1	Steady
Formal votes	32,016				
Informal votes	1,208				
Total	33,224				
Registered voters / turnout					

=== East ===
2024 Victorian local elections: East Ward
Party	Candidate	Votes	%	±%
Independent	Cassy Borthwick (elected 1)	2,837	27.58	+27.58
Independent	Daniel Young (elected 2)	2,059	20.01	+20.01
Independent	Andrew Scanlon (elected 3)	1,458	14.17	+14.17
Independent	Henry Bleeck	1,154	11.22	+11.22
Independent	Dion Alderton	1,145	11.13	+11.13
Independent	Geoffrey Allan Neil	1,137	11.05	−5.13
Independent	Andy McKenzie	498	4.84	+4.84
Total formal votes		10,288	95.98	
Informal votes		431	4.02	
Turnout		10,719	85.51	

=== South ===
2024 Victorian local elections: South Ward
Party	Candidate	Votes	%	±%
Independent Liberal	Dom Bonanno (elected 1)	3,084	27.35	+5.42
Independent	Christine Walker (elected 2)	2,447	21.70	+9.22
Independent	Alison Joseph (elected 3)	2,361	20.93	+20.93
Independent	Rob Guthrie	2,168	19.22	−9.44
Independent	John Letchford	1,218	10.80	+10.80
Total formal votes		11,278	97.06	
Informal votes		342	2.94	
Turnout		11,620	84.83	

=== West ===
2024 Victorian local elections: West Ward
Party	Candidate	Votes	%	±%
Independent	Kate Kendall (elected 1)	4,040	38.66	+38.66
Independent	Jennifer Anderson (elected 2)	2,318	22.18	+5.27
Independent	Janet Pearce (elected 3)	1,288	12.33	−4.96
Independent	Callum Keats	1,182	11.31	+11.31
Independent	Karan Hayman	414	3.96	+3.96
Independent	Rob Bakes	411	3.93	+3.93
Independent	Andrea Haintz	407	3.89	+3.89
Independent	Ryan Templeton	390	3.73	+3.73
Total formal votes		10,450	96.00	
Informal votes		435	4.00	
Turnout		10,885	84.15	

== Mildura ==
2024 Mildura Rural City Council election
- October 2024

All 9 seats on Mildura Rural City Council 5 seats needed for a majority
- 2024 ward boundaries. Expand the map and click on a ward to see the ward name
Largest party before election
Independents
Subsequent largest party
Independents

Mildura Rural City Council is composed of nine single-member wards. Prior to the 2024 election, it was composed of a single multi-member ward with nine members, but the electoral structure has changed as a result of the Local Government Act 2020.

=== Mildura results ===
2024 Victorian local elections: Mildura
Party	Votes	%	Swing	Seats	Change
Independents	21,946	100.00		9	Steady
Formal votes	21,946	95.53			
Informal votes	1,026	4.47			
Total	22,972	100.00		9	Steady
Registered voters / turnout	39,823 (Note: This number is inclusive of the total number of enrolled voters across all wards.)	74.25 (Note: This number does not include enrolled voters from uncontested wards. It is the total turnout for contested wards only.)			

=== City Gate ===
2024 Victorian local elections: City Gate Ward
Party	Candidate	Votes	%	±%
Independent	Katie Clements	1,724	60.51	
Independent	Eric Baumann	1,125	39.49	
Total formal votes		2,849	93.23	
Informal votes		207	6.77	
Turnout		3,056	71.89	
Independent win		(new ward)		

=== Henderson Park ===
2024 Victorian local elections: Henderson Park Ward
Party	Candidate	Votes	%	±%
Independent	Helen Healy	1,728	54.96	
Independent	Liam Andrew Wood	1,416	45.04	
Total formal votes		3,144	94.47	
Informal votes		184	5.53	
Turnout		3,328	72.28	
Independent win		(new ward)		

=== Karadoc ===
2024 Victorian local elections: Karadoc Ward
Party	Candidate	Votes	%	±%
Independent	Rebecca Louise Crossling	unopposed		
Registered electors		4,509		
Independent win		(new ward)		

=== Kings Billabong ===
2024 Victorian local elections: Kings Billabong Ward
Party	Candidate	Votes	%	±%
Independent	Glenn Milne	1,802	53.31	
Independent	Rohan Morris	1,578	46.69	
Total formal votes		3,380	95.78	
Informal votes		149	4.22	
Turnout		3,529	77.10	
Independent win		(new ward)		

=== Lake Ranfurly ===
2024 Victorian local elections: Lake Ranfurly Ward
Party	Candidate	Votes	%	±%
Independent	Troy Bailey	1,574	48.99	
Independent	Stefano De Pieri	1,080	33.61	
Independent	Paul O'Neill	559	17.40	
Total formal votes		3,213	97.42	
Informal votes		85	2.58	
Turnout		3,298	78.23	
Two-candidate-preferred result
Independent	Troy Bailey	1,941	60.41	
Independent	Stefano De Pieri	1,272	39.59	
Independent win		(new ward)		

=== Mildura Wetlands ===
2024 Victorian local elections: Mildura Wetlands Ward
Party	Candidate	Votes	%	±%
Independent	Ali Cupper	2,034	58.96	
Independent	David Esposito	1,416	41.04	
Total formal votes		3,450	96.18	
Informal votes		137	3.82	
Turnout		3,587	78.18	
Independent win		(new ward)		

=== Millewa ===
2024 Victorian local elections: Millewa Ward
Party	Candidate	Votes	%	±%
Independent	Carli Leishman	812	24.00	
Independent	Domenico Capogreco	631	18.65	
Independent	Ian Richard Arney	580	17.14	
Independent	James O'Day	568	16.79	
Independent	Julie Waters	513	15.16	
Independent	Annette Lambert	279	8.25	
Total formal votes		3,383	97.18	
Informal votes		98	2.82	
Turnout		3,481	77.13	
Two-candidate-preferred result
Independent	Ian Richard Arney	1,747	51.64	
Independent	Carli Leishman	1,636	48.36	
Independent win		(new ward)		

=== Nowingi Place ===
2024 Victorian local elections: Nowingi Place Ward
Party	Candidate	Votes	%	±%
Independent	Jodi Reynolds	1,433	56.71	
Independent	Mark Eckel	1,094	43.29	
Total formal votes		2,527	93.84	
Informal votes		166	6.16	
Turnout		2,693	64.26	
Independent win		(new ward)		

=== Sunset Country ===
2024 Victorian local elections: Sunset Country Ward
Party	Candidate	Votes	%	±%
Independent	Greg Brown	unopposed		
Registered electors		4,374		
Independent win		(new ward)		

== Mount Alexander ==
2024 Mount Alexander Shire Council election
- October 2024

All 8 seats on Mount Alexander Shire Council 5 seats needed for a majority
- 2024 ward boundaries. Expand the map and click on a ward to see the ward name
Largest party before election
Independents
Subsequent largest party
Independents

Mount Alexander Shire Council is composed of eight single-member wards. The council increased from seven members to eight prior to the 2024 election; members were previously elected across five wards (four single-member and one three-member).

=== Mount Alexander results ===
2024 Victorian local elections: Mount Alexander
Party	Votes	%	Seats	Change
Independents	4,413	86.61	7	▲1
Greens	682	13.39	1	Steady
Formal votes	5,095	96.90		
Informal votes	163	3.10		
Total	5,258	100.00	8	▲1
Registered voters	16,225			

=== Barkers Creek ===
2024 Victorian local elections: Barkers Creek Ward
Party	Candidate	Votes	%	±%
Independent	Rosie Annear	unopposed		
Registered electors		1,864		
Independent win		(new ward)		

=== Calder ===
2024 Victorian local elections: Calder Ward
Party	Candidate	Votes	%	±%
Independent	Anthony Glenn Cordy	627	36.56	
Independent	Kerrie Allen	549	32.01	
Independent	Ken Price	539	31.43	
Total formal votes		1,715	97.33	
Informal votes		47	2.67	
Turnout		1,762	83.07	
Two-candidate-preferred result
Independent	Anthony Glenn Cordy	988	57.61	
Independent	Kerrie Allen	727	42.39	
Independent hold		Swing	N/A	

=== Campbells Creek ===
2024 Victorian local elections: Campbells Creek Ward
Party	Candidate	Votes	%	±%
Independent	Bill Maltby	956	58.36	
Greens	Gavan Thomson	682	41.64	
Total formal votes		1,638	96.52	
Informal votes		59	3.48	
Turnout		1,697	82.58	
Independent win		(new ward)		

=== Coliban ===
2024 Victorian local elections: Coliban Ward
Party	Candidate	Votes	%	±%
Independent	Kelly Ann Blake	689	39.55	
Independent	Phillip Walker	580	33.30	
Independent	Max Lesser	473	27.15	
Total formal votes		1,742	96.83	
Informal votes		57	3.17	
Turnout		1,799	83.83	
Two-candidate-preferred result
Independent	Phillip Walker	909	52.18	
Independent	Kelly Ann Blake	833	47.82	
Independent gain from Independent		Swing		

=== Forest Creek ===
2024 Victorian local elections: Forest Creek Ward
Party	Candidate	Votes	%	±%
Independent	Toby Heydon	unopposed		
Registered electors		1,932		
Independent win		(new ward)		

=== Loddon River ===
2024 Victorian local elections: Loddon River Ward
Party	Candidate	Votes	%	±%
Independent	Matt Driscoll	unopposed		
Registered electors		2,161		
Independent hold		Swing	N/A	

=== Moonlight Creek ===
2024 Victorian local elections: Moonlight Creek Ward
Party	Candidate	Votes	%	±%
Greens	Lucas Maddock	unopposed		
Registered electors		2,010		
Greens win		(new ward)		

=== Tarrengower ===
2024 Victorian local elections: Tarrengower Ward
Party	Candidate	Votes	%	±%
Independent	Rosalie Hastwell	unopposed		
Registered electors		1,936		
Independent gain from Independent		Swing	N/A	

== Swan Hill ==
2024 Swan Hill Rural City Council election
- October 2024

All 7 seats on Swan Hill Rural City Council 4 seats needed for a majority
Largest party before election
Independents
Subsequent largest party
Independents

Swan Hill Rural City Council is composed of a single multi-member ward electing seven councillors.

=== Swan Hill results ===
2024 Victorian local elections: Swan Hill
Party	Candidate	Votes	%	±%
Ind. United Australia	Stuart King (elected 1)	1,925	19.05	+6.85
Independent	Terry Jennings (elected 2)	1,378	13.64	
Independent	Les McPhee (elected 3)	1,277	12.64	−4.72
Independent	Lindsay Rogers (elected 6)	790	7.82	
Independent	Peta Thornton (elected 5)	756	7.48	
Independent	Phillip Englefield (elected 7)	719	7.12	
Independent	Nicole McKay	627	6.20	−5.08
Independent	Hugh Broad (elected 4)	524	5.19	
Independent	Chris Jeffery	522	5.17	+0.91
Independent	Jana Sarantis	469	4.64	
Independent	Christopher Pearce	318	3.15	
Independent	Jacquie Kelly	309	3.06	
Independent	Kelly Stevens	268	2.65	
Independent	Allen Ridgeway	223	2.21	
Independent	Deon Lever (ineligible) (Note: Candidate was ineligible to contest the election after not completing mandatory candidate training. They still appeared on the ballot as they were only "retired" by the Victorian Electoral Commission after ballot papers had been printed, however they could not serve as a councillor and their votes were distributed to other candidates according to voters' preferences.)	N/A	N/A	−4.17
Total formal votes		10,105	94.34	−0.65
Informal votes		606	5.66	+0.65
Turnout		10,711	76.49	−2.29
