= Wards of the City of Greater Bendigo =

The City of Greater Bendigo has nine wards, each electing a single councillor.

== Axedale ==
Axedale Ward
- Councillor: Shivali Chatley
- Party: Independent Liberal
- Namesake: Axedale
- Electors: 9,887 (2024)
Electorates around Axedale Ward:
Lake Weeroona	Epsom	Campaspe
Kennington	Axedale Ward	Strathbogie
Epalock	Epalock	Mitchell

Axedale Ward covers the suburbs of Strathfieldsaye and Junortoun, the town of Axedale, and the localities of Wellsford, Longlea, Knowsley, Ladys Pass, Mount Camel, Costerfield, Redcastle, Toolleen, and Eppalock. As of the 2024 election, the ward is held by Shivali Chatley.

=== History ===
The ward was created in 2024 after an electoral boundary review.

=== Councillors ===
Councillor	Party	Term	Notes
Shivali Chatley	Independent Liberal	2024 – present	

=== Results ===
==== 2024 ====
2024 Victorian local elections: Axedale Ward
Party	Candidate	Votes	%	±%
Independent Liberal	Shivali Chatley	3,101	36.90	
Independent	Rob Stephenson	2,027	24.12	
Independent	Colin Carrington (Note: Also a member of a political party "that is not Labor, the Liberals or the Nationals".)	1,979	23.55	
Independent	Alida Robinson	1,296	15.42	
Total formal votes		8,403	97.71	
Informal votes		197	2.29	
Turnout		8,600	86.98	
Two-candidate-preferred result
Independent Liberal	Shivali Chatley	4,839	57.59	
Independent	Rob Stephenson	3,564	42.41	
Independent Liberal win		(new ward)		

== Eppalock ==
Eppalock Ward
- Councillor: Aaron Spong
- Party: Independent
- Namesake: Eppalock
- Electors: 10,660 (2024)
Electorates around Eppalock Ward:
Kennington; Golden Square	Axedale	Axedale
Ravenswood	Eppalock Ward	(Mitchell)
Calder Ward (Mt. Alexander)	Calder Ward (Mt. Alexander)	(Mitchell)

Eppalock Ward covers the suburbs of Flora Hill and Spring Gully, the towns of Heathcote and Redesdale, and the localities of Mandurang, Mandurang South, Sedgwick, Emu Creek, Axe Creek, Myrtle Creek, Eppalock, Kimbolton, Derrinal, Mia Mia and Argyle. As of the 2024 election, the ward is held by Aaron Spong.

=== History ===
The ward was created in 2024 after an electoral boundary review.

=== Councillors ===
Councillor	Party	Term	Notes
Aaron Spong	Independent	2024 – present	

=== Results ===
==== 2024 ====
2024 Victorian local elections: Eppalock Ward
Party	Candidate	Votes	%	±%
Independent	Aaron Spong	5,727	69.87	
Independent	Dean Farrell	2,470	30.13	
Total formal votes		8,197	95.54	
Informal votes		383	4.46	
Turnout		8,580	80.49	
Independent win		(new ward)		

== Epsom ==
Epsom Ward
- Created: 2024
- Councillor: Andrea Metcalf
- Party: Independent
- Namesake: Epsom
- Electors: 9,631 (2024)
Electorates around Epsom Ward:
Terrick Ward (Loddon)	Campaspe	Campaspe
Whipstick	Epsom Ward	Campaspe
Lake Weeroona	Axedale	Axedale

Epsom Ward covers the suburbs of Epsom, Huntly, the northern section of Ascot, and the localities of Bagshot, Bagshot North, Huntly North, Wellsford, Barnadown, Fosterville, Kamarooka, Avonmore, Drummartin, and Hunter, as well as the towns of Goornong and Elmore. As of the 2024 election, the ward is held by Andrea Metcalf, who was elected unopposed.

=== History ===
The ward was created in 2024 after an electoral boundary review.

Epsom Ward is, along with Whipstick Ward and Lake Weeroona Ward, one of three single member wards that largely succeed the previous three-member proportional Whipstick Ward.

=== Councillors ===
Councillor	Party	Term	Notes
Andrea Metcalf	Independent	2024 – present	Mayor. Previously held the former Whipstick Ward

=== Results ===
==== 2024 ====
2024 Victorian local elections: Epsom Ward
Party	Candidate	Votes	%	±%
Independent	Andrea Metcalf	unopposed		
Registered electors		9,631		
Independent win		(new ward)		

== Golden Square ==
Golden Square Ward
- Councillor: Karen Corr
- Party: Independent
- Namesake: Golden Square
- Electors: 10,111 (2024)
Electorates around Golden Square Ward:
Lockwood	Lake Weeroona	Kennington
Lockwood	Golden Square Ward	Eppalock
Lockwood	Ravenswood	Eppalock

Golden Square Ward covers the suburbs of Golden Square, Golden Gully and Quarry Hill as well as the southern portions of Bendigo and Ironbark. As of the 2024 election, the ward is held by Karen Corr.

=== History ===
The ward was created in 2024 after an electoral boundary review.

=== Councillors ===
Councillor	Party	Term	Notes
Karen Corr	Independent	2024 – present	

=== Results ===
==== 2024 ====
2024 Victorian local elections: Golden Square Ward
Party	Candidate	Votes	%	±%
Independent	Karen Corr	3,085	39.46	
Independent	Matthew Dwyer	1,778	22.74	
Independent	Vaughan Williams	1,650	21.11	
Independent	Maryann Martinek	1,305	16.69	
Total formal votes		7,818	96.99	
Informal votes		243	3.01	
Turnout		8,061	79.73	
Two-candidate-preferred result
Independent	Karen Corr	4,771	61.03	
Independent	Vaughan Williams	3,047	38.97	
Independent win		(new ward)		

== Kennington ==
Kennington Ward
- Councillor: Abhishek Awasthi
- Party: Independent Labor
- Namesake: Kennington
- Electors: 10,298 (2024)
Electorates around Kennington Ward:
Lake Weeroona	Lake Weeroona	Axedale
Lake Weeroona	Kennington Ward	Axedale
Golden Square	Eppalock	Axedale

Kennington Ward covers the suburbs of Kennington, Strathdale, the southern portion of East Bendigo and eastern sections of Bendigo. As of the 2024 election, the ward is held by Abhishek Awasthi.

=== History ===
The ward was created in 2024 after an electoral boundary review.

=== Councillors ===
Councillor	Party	Term	Notes
Abhishek Awasthi	Independent Labor	2024 – present	Deputy mayor

=== Results ===
==== 2024 ====
2024 Victorian local elections: Kennington Ward
Party	Candidate	Votes	%	±%
Independent Labor	Abhishek Awasthi	4,713	58.86	
Greens	Gavin Hicks	3,294	41.14	
Total formal votes		8,007	95.70	
Informal votes		360	4.30	
Turnout		8,367	81.25	
Independent Labor win		(new ward)		

== Lake Weeroona ==
Lake Weeroona Ward
- Councillor: Thomas Prince
- Party: Independent
- Namesake: Lake Weeroona
- Electors: 9,845 (2024)
Electorates around Lake Weeroona Ward:
Whipstick	Epsom	Epsom
Lockwood	Lake Weeroona Ward	Axedale
Golden Square	Kennington	Axedale

Lake Weeroona Ward covers the suburbs of Bendigo, North Bendigo, White Hills, the southern portions of Epsom and Ascot and the northern portion of East Bendigo. As of the 2024 election, the ward is held by Thomas Prince.

=== History ===
The ward was created in 2024 after an electoral boundary review.

=== Councillors ===
Image	Councillor	Party	Term	Notes
	Thomas Prince	Independent	2024 – present	

=== Results ===
==== 2024 ====
2024 Victorian local elections: Lake Weeroona Ward
Party	Candidate	Votes	%	±%
Independent	Thomas Prince	3,889	54.03	
Independent	Luke Martin	3,309	45.97	
Total formal votes		7,198	94.92	
Informal votes		385	5.08	
Turnout		7,583	77.02	
Independent win		(new ward)		

== Lockwood ==
Lockwood Ward
- Created: 2024
- Councillor: Donna Nicholas
- Party: Independent
- Namesake: Lockwood
- Electors: 10,286 (2024)
Electorates around Lockwood Ward:
Terrick Ward (Loddon)	Whipstick Ward	Lake Weeroona Ward
Inglewood Ward (Loddon)	Lockwood Ward	Golden Square Ward
Tarnagulla Ward (Loddon)	Tarrengower Ward (Mt. Alexander)	Ravenswood Ward

Lockwood Ward covers the suburbs of Long Gully, West Bendigo and Maiden Gully, the towns of Marong and Lockwood, and the localities of Myers Flat, Leichardt, Wilsons Hill and Shelbourne.

As of the 2026 by-election, the incumbent councillor is Donna Nicholas.

=== History ===
The ward was created in 2024 after an electoral boundary review.

Following the 2024 election, the ward was inaugurally held by John McIlrath.

=== Councillors ===
Councillor	Party	Term	Notes
John McIlrath	Independent	2024 – 2025	Resigned
Donna Nicholas	Independent	2026 – 2026	Elected at March 2026 by-election. Died in office
David Thorpe	Independent	2026 – present	Elected at October 2026 by-election.

=== Results ===
==== 2026 (October) ====
October 2026 Lockwood Ward by-election (14 September – 2 October 2026)
Party	Candidate	Votes	%	±%
Independent	Ajay Mishra	2,287	26.95	+8.63
Independent	David Thorpe	1,846	21.76	+21.76
Greens	Robert Phillip Holian	1,397	16.46	+2.25
Independent	Emily Edgar	1,251	14.74	+6.65
Independent	MaryAnn Martinek	1,135	13.38	+8.70
Independent	Grant Lockwood	569	6.71	+6.71
Total formal votes		8,485	98.05	+1.30
Informal votes		169	1.95	−1.30
Turnout		8,654	81.53	+0.39
Two-candidate-preferred result
Independent	David Thorpe	4,365	51.44	+51.44
Independent	Ajay Mishra	4,120	48.56	+12.40
Independent gain from Independent		Swing	+51.44	

- By-election held after the death of sitting councillor Donna Nicholas.

==== 2026 (March) ====
March 2026 Lockwood Ward by-election (6–27 March 2026)
Party	Candidate	Votes	%	±%
Independent	Donna Nicholas	1,877	22.70	+22.70
Independent	Colin Carrington	1,541	18.63	+18.63
Independent	Ajay Mishra	1,515	18.32	+18.32
Greens	Robert Holian	1,175	14.21	+14.21
Independent	Vaughan Williams	684	8.27	+8.27
Independent	Emily Edgar	669	8.09	+8.09
Victorian Socialists	Tayne Shalevski	422	5.10	+5.10
Independent	Mary-Ann Martinek	387	4.68	+4.68
Total formal votes		8,269	96.75	+1.51
Informal votes		278	3.25	−1.51
Turnout		8,547	81.14	−0.77
Two-candidate-preferred result
Independent	Donna Nicholas	5,279	63.84	+63.84
Independent	Ajay Mishra	2,990	36.16	+36.16
Independent gain from Independent		Swing	+63.84	

- By-election held after the resignation of sitting councillor John McIlrath.

==== 2024 ====
2024 Victorian local elections: Lockwood Ward
Party	Candidate	Votes	%	±%
Independent	John McIlrath	4,753	59.23	
Independent	Jay Brady	3,271	40.77	
Total formal votes		8,024	95.24	
Informal votes		401	4.76	
Turnout		8,425	81.91	
Independent win		(new ward)		

== Ravenswood ==
Ravenswood Ward
- Councillor: Damien Hurrell
- Party: Independent Labor
- Namesake: Ravenswood
- Electors: 10,246 (2024)
Electorates around Ravenswood Ward:
Lockwood	Golden Square	Eppalock
Lockwood	Ravenswood Ward	Eppalock
Tarrengower Ward (Mt. Alexander)	Calder Ward (Mt. Alexander)	Calder Ward (Mt. Alexander)

Ravenswood Ward covers the suburbs of Kangaroo Flat and Big Hill and the localities of Ravenswood, Lockwood South, and Harcourt North. As of the 2024 election, the ward is held by Damien Hurrell.

=== History ===
The ward was created in 2024 after an electoral boundary review.

=== Councillors ===
Councillor	Party	Term	Notes
Damien Hurrell	Independent Labor	2024 – present	

=== Results ===
==== 2024 ====
2024 Victorian local elections: Ravenswood Ward
Party	Candidate	Votes	%	±%
Independent Labor	Damien Hurrell	2,637	32.91	
Independent	Donna Nicholas	2,522	31.47	
Independent	Emma Berglund	1,858	23.19	
Ind. Legalise Cannabis	John Cooper	996	12.43	
Total formal votes		8,013	97.21	
Informal votes		230	2.79	
Turnout		8,243	80.45	
Two-candidate-preferred result
Independent Labor	Damien Hurrell	4,101	51.18	
Independent	Donna Nicholas	3,912	48.82	
Independent Labor win		(new ward)		

== Whipstick ==
Whipstick Ward
- Created: 2024
- Councillor: Owen Cosgriff
- Party: Victorian Socialists
- Namesake: Whipstick
- Electors: 10,708 (2024)
Electorates around Whipstick Ward:
Terrick Ward (Loddon)	Terrick Ward (Loddon)	Epsom Ward
Inglewood Ward (Loddon)	Whipstick Ward	Epsom Ward
Lockwood Ward	Lockwood Ward	Lake Weeroona Ward

Whipstick Ward covers the suburbs of Eaglehawk, California Gully, Jackass Flat and Sailors Gully, the localities of Eaglehawk North, Woodvale, Whipstick and Neilborough and the towns of Sebastian and Raywood. As of the 2024 election, the ward is held by Owen Cosgriff, a member of the Victorian Socialists.

=== History ===
Whipstick Ward shares its name with the former three-member proportional ward which covered what is now largely Whipstick, Epsom, and Lake Weeroona Wards.

The ward was created in 2024 after an electoral boundary review.

=== Councillors ===
Image	Councillor	Party	Term	Notes
	Owen Cosgriff	Victorian Socialists	26 October 2024 – present	Incumbent

=== Results ===
==== 2024 ====
2024 Victorian local elections: Whipstick Ward
Party	Candidate	Votes	%	±%
Victorian Socialists	Owen Cosgriff	3,387	40.67	
Independent	Bevan Madden	2,737	32.87	
Independent	Jan Pagliaro	2,203	26.46	
Total formal votes		8,327	96.86	
Informal votes		270	3.14	
Turnout		8,597	80.29	
Two-candidate-preferred result
Victorian Socialists	Owen Cosgriff	4,387	52.68	
Independent	Bevan Madden	3,940	47.32	
Victorian Socialists win		(new ward)		
