= List of mayors of Bendigo =

Mayor of City of Greater Bendigo
- Incumbent; Thomas Prince since 2025
- Style: Your Worship; Mr/Mrs/Ms Mayor
- Appointer: Greater Bendigo City Council
- Term length: 1 year
- Inaugural holder: Megan Weston
- Formation: 1994
- Deputy: Karen Corr

This is a list of the mayors of the City of Greater Bendigo a local government area in Victoria, Australia, and its pre-amalgamation predecessors: the Sandhurst Municipal Council, the City of Sandhurst, the City of Bendigo and the Borough of Eaglehawk. The City of Greater Bendigo was formed in 1994 by the amalgamation of the City of Bendigo with the Borough of Eaglehawk, Shire of Strathfieldsaye, Shire of Huntly and parts of the Rural City of Marong and Shire of McIvor.

The current mayor is Thomas Prince who was voted into the position by councillors in 2025 while the current deputy mayor is Karen Corr, who was also voted into the position by councillors in 2025.

== Overview ==
=== Formation of the council ===
The first Sandhurst Municipal Council election was held on 10 January 1856; the first meeting occurred on 14 January, where Edward Nucella Emmett was appointed the council's first Chairman. The council consisted of seven members, including the Chairman. The first duties of the council included the formation of a ratepayers role, the appointment of officers, and the assessment of properties within the municipality. In September 1863, Sandhurst became a borough, resulting in the number of council members increasing to nine.

In 1867, three wards were created, named after the three most recent Governors of Victoria: Darling, Barkly, and Sutton. (Note: The wards were named after Sir Charles Darling (1856–1863), Sir Henry Barkly (1863–1866) and Sir John Manners-Sutton (1866–1873).) Three councillors were required for each ward; each councillor, elected by ratepayers, selected the wards they wished to represent. Each councillor was elected for a three-year term.

=== Elections ===
Following the annual council election, the mayor is elected by councillors. The mayor holds office for one year only, but is eligible for re-election.

=== Mayoral chain ===
On 4 July 1893, a mayoral chain was introduced for the City of Sandhurst; the idea for introducing the chain had been suggested by mayor Joseph Henry Abbott the previous year. Constructed from gold harvested during Bendigo's gold rush, the mayoral chain was created by Bendigo jeweller F. N. Prescott. A large gold medallion, presented by George Lansell and bearing the City of Bendigo coat of arms, was included on the chain. At their own expense, each past mayor was asked to supply a link for the chain, engraved with their name, monogram and year of office; most surviving mayors, and the relatives of those who had died, provided a link to the chain.

In February 1998, a new mayoral chain was created for the newly-amalgamated City of Greater Bendigo, created by Tony Kean from gold harvested in the Central Deborah Gold Mine. The crests of each of the former Bendigo municipalities that had existed before council amalgamation were featured on individual links of the chain. The chain was designed to hold thirty links to accommodate future mayors. New links in the chain will be funded by the council.

== Bendigo ==
=== Sandhurst Municipal Council (1856–1871) ===
From 1856 until 1871, Sandhurst Municipal Council leaders were referred to as "Chairmen".

#	Portrait	Chairman	Ward	Term
1		Edward Nucella Emmett		1856–1857
2		James Forrester Sullivan		1857–1858
3		William Vazie Simons		1858–1860
4		Joseph Henry Abbott		1860–1861
5		James Joseph Casey		1861 (Note: Resigned as mayor before his term had ended on being elected to Parliament.)
6		Robert Strickland		1861–1862
7		Robert Burrowes		1862–1863
8		John McIntyre	Darling (Note: 1867 onwards.)	1863–1868
9		John Holmes	Darling	1868–1869
10		George Aspinall	Barkly	1869–1870
11		James Boyd	Sutton	1870–1871

=== City of Sandhurst (1871–1891) ===
On 21 July 1871, the Sandhurst Municipal Council became the City of Sandhurst. All subsequent council leaders were referred to as "Mayors", with James Boyd being the first mayor of the City of Sandhurst.

#	Portrait	Mayor	Ward	Term
1		James Boyd	Sutton	1870–1871
2		Dugald Macdougall	Sutton	1871–1873
3		George Aspinall	Barkly	1873–1874
4		John Augustus Woodward	Sutton	1874–1875
5		Robert Clark	Barkly	1875–1876
6		Henry Hattam	Sutton	1876 (Note: Died before completing term.)
7		Ebenezer Neill	Barkly	1876–1877
8		Alexander Bayne	Darling	1877–1878
9		David Chaplin Sterry	Sutton	1878–1879
(4)		John Augustus Woodward	Sutton	1879–1880
10		Patrick Hayes	Barkly	1880–1881
11		Walter George Jackson	Darling	1881–1882
12		Abraham Harkness	Sutton	1882–1883
13		Alfred Shrapnell Bailes	Barkly	1883-1884
14		John Delbridge	Sutton	1884–1885
15		Samuel Henry McGowan	Barkly	1885–1886
(10)		Patrick Hayes	Barkly	1886–1887
16		Thomas Jefferson Connelly	Darling	1887–1888
17		Jacob Isaac Cohn	Darling	1888–1889
18		John Paul Carolin	Darling	1889–1890
19		John Roberts Hoskins	Sutton	1890–1891

=== City of Bendigo (1891–1994) ===
On 8 May 1891, Sandhurst was renamed Bendigo; the first mayor of the City of Bendigo was Joseph Henry Abbott.

#	Portrait	Mayor	Ward	Term
20		Joseph Henry Abbott	Darling	1891–1893
21		Daniel Barnet Lazarus	Sutton	1893–1894
22		Conrad Heinz	Barkly	1894–1895
(21)		Daniel Barnet Lazarus	Sutton	1895–1896
23		Harry Montague Marks	Darling	1896–1897
(12)		Abraham Harkness	Sutton	1897–1899
(15)		Samuel Henry McGowan	Barkly	1899–1900
24		Simeon Ryan	Barkly	1900–1901
25		John Roberts Hoskins	Sutton	1901–1902
26		James Henry Curnow	Sutton	1902–1904
27		Ambrose Dunstan	Barkly	1904–1905
28		Luke Murphy	Darling	1905–1906
29		James Semmens	Barkly	1906–1907
(18)		John Paul Carolin	Darling	1907–1908
30		Andrew Harkness (Note: Son of former mayor Abraham Harkness.)	Sutton	1908–1909
31		David John Andrew	Sutton	1909–1910
32		William Henry Wilkie	Barkly	1910–1911
33		Harry Astwood Ross	Sutton	1911–1912
(26)		James Henry Curnow	Sutton	1912–1913
(31)		David John Andrew	Sutton	1913–1914
(32)		William Henry Wilkie	Barkly	1914–1915
34		William Beebe	Darling	1915–1917
35		Richard Hartley Smith Abbott	Darling	1917–1918
(27)		Ambrose Dunstan	Barkly	1918–1919
(26)		James Henry Curnow	Sutton	1919–1920
(31)		David John Andrew	Sutton	1920–1921
36		James Edward Holland	Sutton	1921–1922
37		Michael Gabriel Giudice	Sutton	1922–1924
38		Ernest Morton Vains	Sutton	1924–1925
39		William Ewing	Darling	1925–1926
40		John Andrew Michelsen	Barkly	1926–1927
(26)		James Henry Curnow	Sutton	1927–1928
41		Edwin George Batchelder	Sutton	1928–1929
42		Michael Eugene O'Brien	Barkly	1929–1930
43		William Henry Taylor	Darling	1930–1931
44		George Dawson Garvin	Sutton	1931–1932
45		Frederick Conrad Niemann	Sutton	1932–1933
46		George Bennetts	Darling	1933–1934
47		Albert Staples	Sutton	1934–1935
(40)		John Andrew Michelsen	Barkly	1935–1936
48		William May Bolton	Sutton	1936–1937
(43)		William Henry Taylor	Darling	1937–1938
(44)		George Dawson Garvin	Sutton	1938–1939
(47)		Albert Staples	Darling	1939–1940
49		George Albert Pethard	Darling	1940–1941
50		Alfred John Anderson	Barkly	1941–1942
(40)		John Andrew Michelsen	Barkly	1941–1942
(43)		William Henry Taylor	Darling	1942–1943
51		Leslie William Galvin	Sutton	1944–1945
52		Anthony T. Truscott	Barkly	1945–1946
53		David William Streader	Sutton	1946–1947
(49)		George Albert Pethard	Darling	1947–1948
54		Ernest Frederick Granger	Darling	1948–1949
55		Robert Poulston	Barkly	1949–1950
56		Norman Joseph Oliver	Darling	1950–1951
(49)		George Albert Pethard	Darling	1951–1952
57		Thomas Richard Flood	Barkly	1952–1953
58		Frederick William Clayton	Sutton	1953–1954
(55)		Robert Poulston	Barkly	1954–1955
59		Henry William Snell	Darling	1955–1956
60		Alexander Sadler Craig	Barkly	1956–1957
(57)		Thomas Richard Flood	Barkly	1957–1958
(58)		Henry William Snell	Darling	1958–1960
61		Rupert Harold Thomas Wilson	Darling	1960–1961
(58)		Frederick William Clayton	Barkly	1961–1962
62		Roy Alexander Rae	Barkly	1962–1963
(59)		Alexander Sadler Craig	Barkly	1963–1964
(56)		Norman Joseph Oliver	Darling	1964–1965
63		Roy Francis (Dick) Turner	Sutton	1965–1966
(57)		Thomas Richard Flood	Barkly	1966–1967
64		Rodney Warren Cambridge	Barkly	1967–1968
(57)		Thomas Richard Flood	Barkly	1968–1969
65		James Clarkson McCoy (Clark) Jeffrey	Darling	1969–1970
(56)		Norman Joseph Oliver	Darling	1970–1971
66		Douglas Ewan Elliott	Sutton	1971–1972
67		Joseph Patrick Pearce	Darling	1972–1973
(59)		Alexander Sadler Craig	Barkly	1973–1974
(63)		Roy Francis (Dick) Turner	Sutton	1974–1975
68		Robert Lindsay Campbell	Sutton	1975–1976
69		Robert Russell Cooper	Barkly	1976–1977
(63)		Roy Francis (Dick) Turner	Sutton	1977–1978
70		Eugene Carl Sandner	Barkly	1978–1979
(68)		Robert Lindsay Campbell	Sutton	1979–1980
71		Paul T. Tomkinson	Barkly	1980–1981
72		Christopher David Stoltz	Sutton	1981–1982
(67)		Joseph Patrick Pearce	Darling	1982–1983
73		Peter Mansell	Barkly	1983–1984
(67)		Joseph Patrick Pearce	Darling	1984–1985
74		Norman Francis Quin	Darling	1985–1986
75		Michael Alexander Anthony Currie	Sutton	1986–1987
76		Colin Mayne Nankervis	Barkly	1987–1988
77		Robin L. Adams	Barkly	1988–1989
78		Peter R. Morley	Barkly	1989–1990
79		James Douglass	Darling	1990–1993
80		Andrew John Balsillie	Darling	1993–1994

=== Commissioners (1994–1996) ===
Commissioners	Term
Peter Ross-Edwards (Chairman)	1994–1996
Les Crofts	1993–1995
Maxine Crouch	1995–1996
Gordon McKern	1993–1994
Maurie Sharkey	1994–1996

=== City of Greater Bendigo (1996–present) ===
In 1996, seven newly-named wards were created for the amalgamated City of Greater Bendigo. They were: Grassy Flat, Whipstick, Sandhurst, Eppalock, Diamond Hill, Fortuna and Eaglehawk. In 2004, a nine-ward structure was introduced. The new wards were: Golden Square, Kangaroo Flat, Flora Hill, North West Plains, Sandhurst, Eaglehawk; Epsom, Strathfieldsayed and Eppalock. In 2012, a "three ward, three councillor" system was reintroduced, the wards being named: Whipstick, Lockwood, and Eppalock.

In 2016, the new position of deputy mayor was introduced. In 2024, the council reverted back to a nine-ward structure. The new wards were Epsom, Kennington, Whipstick, Eppalock, Lockwood, Axedale, Golden Square, Lake Weeroona and Ravenswood.

#	Mayor	Ward	Term
1	Megan Weston	Eaglehawk	1996–1997
2	Barry Ackerman	Grassy Flat	1997–1998
3	Maurie Sharkey	Whipstick	1998–1999
4	Daryl McClure	Sandhurst	1999–2000
5	Laurie Whelan	Eppalock	2000–2001
(2)	Barry Ackerman	Grassy Flat	2001–2002
6	Willi Carney	Eaglehawk	2002–2003
7	Rod Fyffe	Fortuna	2003–2004
8	Greg Williams	Eppalock	2004
(7)	Rod Fyffe	Golden Square	2004–2005
9	David Jones	Kangaroo Flat	2005–2006
10	Julie Rivendell	Flora Hill	2006–2007
(9)	David Jones	Kangaroo Flat	2007–2008
11	Kevin Gibbins	North West Plains	2008–2009
12	Rod Campbell	Eppalock	2009–2010
(7)	Rod Fyffe	Golden Square	2010–2011
13	Alec Sandner	Flora Hill	2011–2012
14	Lisa Ruffell	Whipstick	2012–2013
15	Barry Lyons	Lockwood	2013–2014
16	Peter Cox	Whipstick	2014–2015
(7)	Rod Fyffe	Lockwood	2015–2016
17	Margaret O'Rourke	Eppalock	2016–2020
18	Jennifer Alden	Lockwood	2020–2021
19	Andrea Metcalf	Whipstick	2021–2025
19	Andrea Metcalf	Epsom Ward	2021–2025
20	Thomas Prince	Lake Weeroona	2025–present

=== Deputy mayors (2016–present) ===
#	Deputy Mayor	Ward	Term
1	Rod Fyffe	Lockwood	2016–2017
2	Jennifer Alden	Lockwood	2017–2018
(1)	Rod Fyffe	Lockwood	2018–2019
3	Matt Emond	Lockwood	2019–2020
5	Andrea Metcalf	Whipstick	2020–2021
6	Matthew Evans	Eppalock	2021–2022
(2)	Jennifer Alden	Lockwood	2022–2023
(6)	Matthew Evans	Eppalock	2023–2024
7	Abhishek Awasthi	Kennington	2024–2025
8	Karen Corr	Golden Square	2025–present

== Eaglehawk ==
=== Borough of Eaglehawk (1862–1994) ===
Prior to 1862, Eaglehawk was included under the Marong District Roads Board. Eaglehawk became a borough on 29 July 1862. The first council election for the Borough of Eaglehawk took place on 5 September 1862, where James Mouat was elected Eaglehawk's first and only Chairman. John Thomas Caldwell was the first Mayor of Eaglehawk.

The council comprised nine members, including the mayor. In 1984, the council purchased "Caradon", an historic two-story house located in Victoria Street, Eaglehawk, which served as the council's municipal office. The property was sold in 1997 by the City of Greater Bendigo.

#	Mayor	Term
1	James Mouat (Note: The first and only Chairman. All subsequent leaders were Mayors.)	1862–1863
2	John Thomas Caldwell	1863–1864
3	Charles Letheby	1864–1868
4	John William Williams	1868–1869
(2)	John Thomas Caldwell	1869–1871
5	Henry Trumble	1871–1873
6	Hay Kirkwood	1873–1876
7	Joseph Harris	1876–1877
(6)	Hay Kirkwood	1877–1878
(5)	Henry Trumble	1878–1879
8	George Willan	1879–1880
(1)	James Mouat	1880–1881
9	John Joseph Hall	1881–1882
10	William Vincent Kneebone	1882–1883
11	George Louden	1883–1884
12	John Green	1884–1885
(6)	Hay Kirkwood	1885–1886
(8)	George Willan	1886–1887
13	Edward McCormick	1887–1888
14	Frederick Clark	1888–1889
(1)	James Mouat	1889–1890
(10)	William Vincent Kneebone	1890–1891
15	William James	1891–1892
(11)	George Loudon	1892–1893
(13)	Edward McCormick	1893–1894
(12)	John Green	1894–1895
(14)	Frederick Clark	1895–1896
16	Edward Charles Brown	1896–1897
17	John Highmore	1897–1898
18	Michael John Curtain	1898–1899
19	Henry Alexander Chapple	1899–1900
(11)	George Loudon	1900–1901
(12)	John Green	1901–1902
(14)	Frederick Clark	1902–1903
20	Robert Murdoch	1903–1904
21	Alfred Hicks	1904–1905
22	John T Trevean	1905–1906
23	John Henry Webster	1906–1907
24	John Praed	1907–1908
(12)	John Green	1908–1909
25	Jonathan Smalley	1909–1910
(20)	Robert Murdoch	1910–1911
(23)	John H Webster	1911–1912
26	John Hooper	1912–1913
27	William J Dunstan	1913–1914
28	George H Green	1914–1915
29	Daniel Oswald	1915–1916
30	Henry Lane Ralph	1916–1917
(22)	John T Trevean	1917–1918
(23)	John H Webster	1918–1919
(20)	Robert Murdoch	1919–1920
(27)	William J Dunstan	1920–1921
31	Frank Clayton	1921–1922
(29)	Daniel Oswald	1922–1923
32	John H Stewart	1923–1924
33	Michael Collins	1924–1925
34	John Manderson	1925–1926
(20)	Robert Murdoch (Note: Died before completing term)	1926–1927
35	Sydney B Hocking	1927
(27)	William J Dunstan	1927–1928
(35)	Sydney B Hocking	1928–1929
36	Robert Watson	1929–1930
37	Gilbert W Jenkins	1930–1931
(32)	John H Stewart	1931–1932
38	John L Hicks	1932–1933
39	Thomas R Davies	1933–1934
40	Joseph H Meggs	1934–1935
(36)	Robert Watson	1935–1936
(37)	Gilbert W Jenkins	1936–1937
41	Daniel Murdoch	1937–1938
42	Percival Truscott	1938–1939
(38)	John L Hicks	1939–1940
(39)	Thomas R Davies	1940–1941
(29)	Daniel Oswald	1941–1942
(36)	Robert Watson	1942–1943
43	John H Davey	1943–1944
(41)	Daniel Murdoch	1944–1945
(39)	Thomas R Davies (Note: Died before completing term)	1945–1946
(41)	Daniel Murdoch	1946
(36)	Robert Watson	1946–1947
44	George T Speedy	1947–1948
45	Patrick J J Finch	1948–1949
46	Alfred Lloyd George Jenkins	1949–1950
(26)	Robert Watson	1950–1951
47	James H Laurie	1951–1952
(44)	George T Speedy	1952–1953
(38)	John L Hicks	1953–1954
48	Howard W Rule	1954–1955
(36)	Robert Watson	1955–1956
(44)	George T Speedy	1956–1957
(38)	John L Hicks	1957–1958
49	Albert L Roy	1958–1959
50	George A Johnston	1959–1960
51	Walter R Mathrick	1960–1961
52	Pierce J Grenfell	1961–1962
(50)	George A Johnston	1962–1963
(49)	Albert L Roy	1963–1965
53	Frederick C Straub	1965–1966
54	Jack Taylor	1966–1967
55	Ronald G Manning	1967–1968
56	Kenneth Burch	1968–1969
(50)	Albert L Roy	1969–1970
57	Percival Charles Shepperbottom	1970–1971
(54)	Jack Taylor	1971–1972
(50)	Albert L Roy	1972–1973
58	William H Allen	1973–1974
59	A William Bullock	1974–1975
60	Ian McKenzie	1975–1976
(54)	Jack Taylor	1976–1977
(59)	A William Bullock	1977–1978
(60)	Ian McKenzie	1978–1979
61	Paul F Firth	1979–1980
(50)	Albert L Roy	1980–1981
(54)	Jack Taylor	1981–1982
62	Gary J Thorn	1982–1983
63	Ian B Reid	1983–1984
(62)	Gary J Thorn	1984–1985
64	Edward William Miller	1985–1986
65	Willi A Carney	1986–1987
(54)	Jack Taylor	1987–1988
66	Robert V Bell	1988–1989
67	Leon M Scott	1989–1990
(65)	Willi A Carney	1990–1991
68	Jill E Williams	1991–1992
69	Lola M Miller	1992–1993
70	Megan Weston	1993–1994

== See also ==
- City of Bendigo
- Borough of Eaglehawk
