= Samuel McGowan =

Samuel McGowan may refer to:

- Samuel McGowan (admiral)
- Samuel McGowan (general)
- Samuel McGowan (engineer)
- S. H. McGowan (Samuel Henry McGowan), gold mining entrepreneur in Bendigo, Victoria, Australia

== See also ==
- Samuel Magowan, member of the Parliament of Northern Ireland
