= Ascot, Bendigo =

Ascot
- Suburb
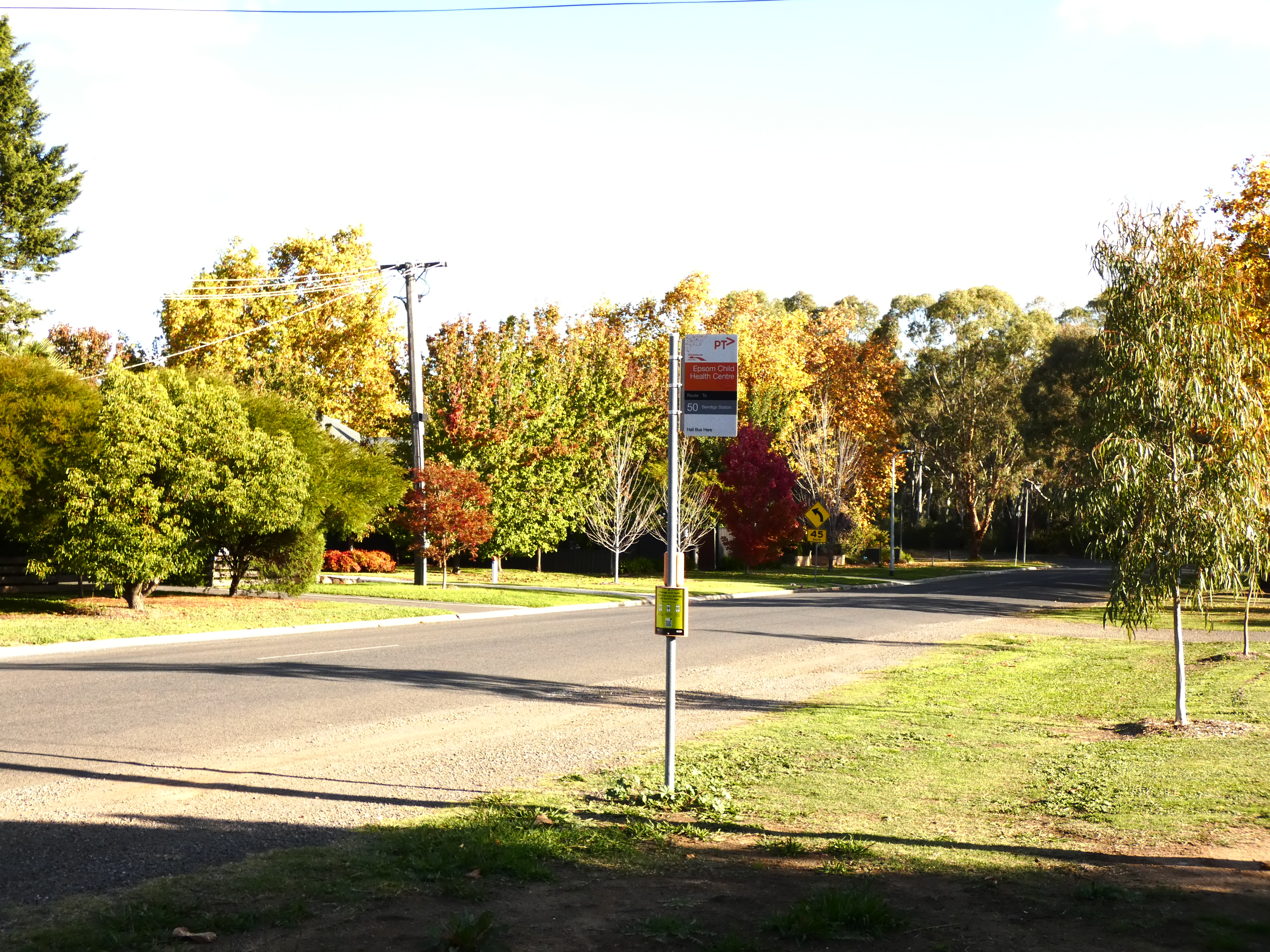
- Bus Stop in Strickland Street, May 2026

- Interactive map of Ascot
- Coordinates: 36.711109°S 144.332462°E
- Country: Australia
- State: Victoria
- City: Bendigo
- LGA: City of Greater Bendigo

Government
  - State electorate: Bendigo East
  - Federal division: Bendigo

Population
  - Total: 2,571 (2021 census)
- Postcode: 3551

Ascot is a suburb of northern Bendigo, in the City of Greater Bendigo in the Australian state of Victoria. It was surveyed in 1874 and proclaimed a town in 1875. It is separated from the suburb of Epsom by the Bendigo - Echuca railway line.
