= Barry Ackerman =

Bendigo politician (born 1934)

Mayor of the City of Greater Bendigo
- In office April 1997 – 7 April 1998
- Preceded by: Megan Weston
- Succeeded by: Maurie Sharkey
- In office 2001–2002
- Preceded by: Laurie Whelan
- Succeeded by: Willi Carney

Councillor of the City of Greater Bendigo for Grassy Flat Ward
- In office 1996–2002
- Preceded by: New ward
- Succeeded by: Bruce Phillips

Personal details
- Born: 1934 (age 91–92) Whetstone, London, England
- Spouse: Joyce Toll (m. 1958; death 2017)
- Children: 2
- Awards: Centenary Medal for Services to the Community (2003)

Barry Ackerman (born 1934) is a British-Australian former politician, serving as mayor of the City of Greater Bendigo twice.

== Early life and career ==
Ackerman was born in Whetstone, London in 1934. He attended Finchley County Grammar School before attending the National College of Rubber Technology for four years. After graduating, he began working for Empire Rubber. In 1976, as a member of the Board of Directors, Ackerman was asked to help finalise the factory of the Australian subsidiary in Melbourne in its move to Bendigo, where he stayed for six weeks. After returning to the United Kingdom, Ackerman was then offered a job as the Managing Director of Empire Rubber in Bendigo. Although initially planning to move back to the United Kingdom after eighteen months, Ackerman and his family stayed in Bendigo permanently.

Ackerman served as a member of the Bendigo TAFE board for ten years, as President of the Bendigo branch of the Chamber of Manufactures (now the Australian Industry Group), and as a board member, and subsequently treasurer, of the Bendigo Art Gallery. Ackerman was made a Fellow of the Plastics and Rubber Industry in 1981. In 1983, Ackerman began serving as a member of the Rotary Club of Bendigo.

== Political career ==
Ackerman retired in 1995. After being approached by City of Greater Bendigo Council's then Chief Executive Officer, Peter Seamer, to consider running for the newly amalgamated council, Ackerman was elected to the inaugural council in the 1996 election as a member of the Grassy Flat Ward. In his first year on the council, Ackerman assisted with the beautification of the city of Bendigo, the refurbishment of the Bendigo Town Hall, and an extension for the Bendigo Art Gallery. He was then re-elected in the 1999 election.

Ackerman served as the mayor of the City of Greater Bendigo on two occasions, from 1997 to 1998 and from 2001 to 2002. During his time as mayor, Ackerman was involved in various community projects and commemorations. In 1997, he officiated the opening of the Bendigo and District Ostomy Association's new facilities, while in 1998, he officiated the memorial plaque for the Ravenswood Estate Soldier Settlement, which recognised the area's post-war development efforts and its role in supporting rural communities. In 1998, there was a call from businesses to scrap parking meters in Bendigo's Central Business District, a proposal that Ackerman strongly criticised.

In 2002, Ackerman retired as a councillor to spend more time with his grandchildren in Melbourne. The following year, Ackerman received the Centenary Medal for Services to the Community.

== Personal life ==
In 1958, Ackerman married his wife, Joyce Toll, at the All Saints' Church, Friern Barnet in North London. They had two sons and three grandchildren.
