= Daniel Barnet Lazarus =

Australian politician

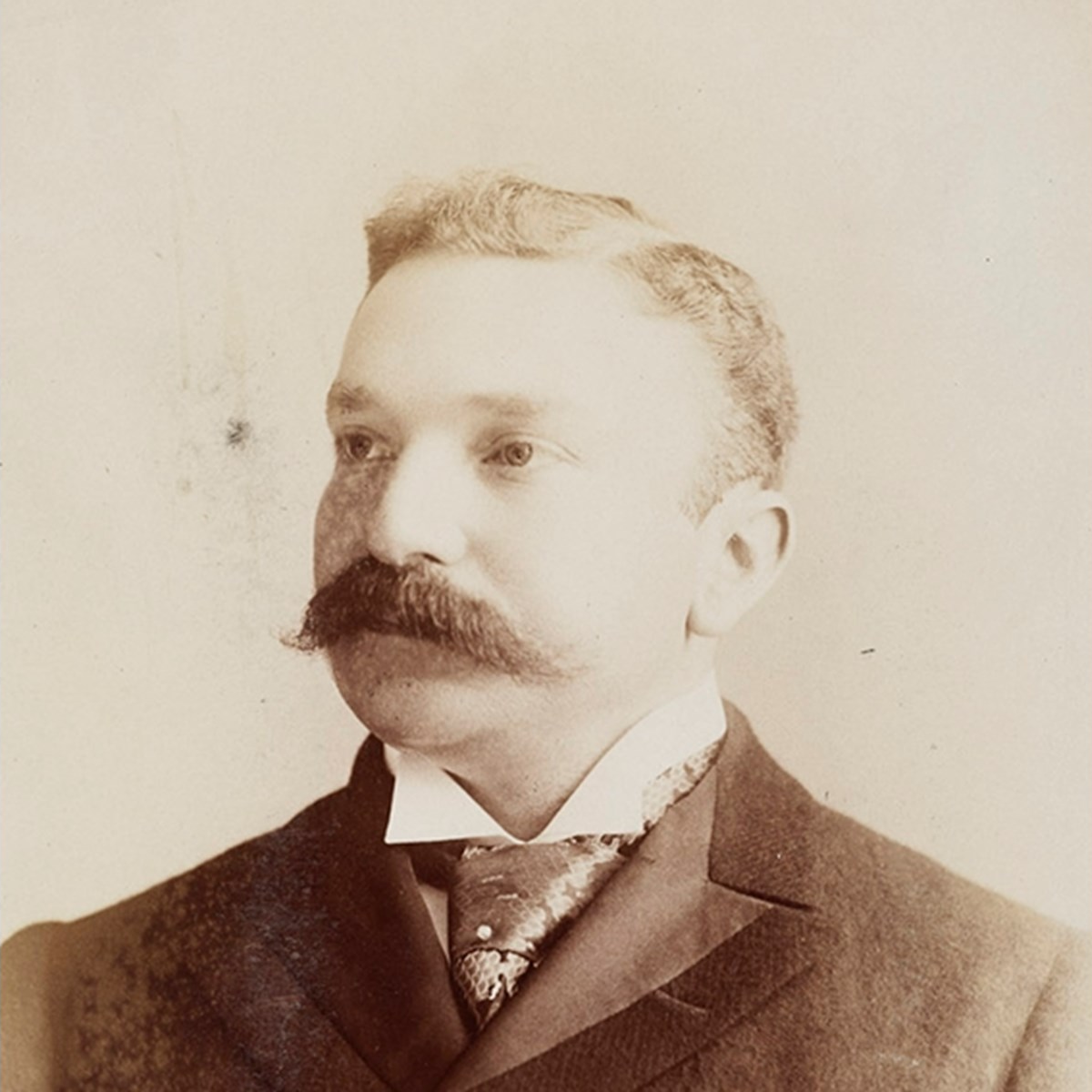

Mayor of Bendigo
- In office 18 August 1893 – 1894
- Preceded by: Joseph Henry Abbott
- Succeeded by: Conrad Heinz
- In office 1895–1896
- Preceded by: Conrad Heinz
- Succeeded by: Harry Montague Marks

Member of the Victorian Legislative Assembly for Sandhurst
- In office 1 October 1893 – 1 September 1897
- In office 1 November 1900 – 1 September 1902

Councillor of the City of Bendigo for Sutton Ward

Personal details
- Born: 20 October 1866 Bendigo, Victoria, Australia
- Died: 9 March 1932 (aged 65) Melbourne, Victoria, Australia

Daniel Barnet Lazarus (20 October 1866 – 9 March 1932) was an Australian politician who served as a member of the Victorian Legislative Assembly between 1893 and 1897 and again from 1900 to 1902, and as the mayor of Bendigo twice, from 1893 to 1894 and again from 1894 to 1895.

== Early life ==
Daniel Barnet Lazarus was born on 20 October 1866 at New Chum, Bendigo, Victoria. He was the fifth child of Barnet Lazarus, a Polish-born gold-mine owner, and Dina Lazarus (née Abraham), who was born in London. His father, Barnet, had arrived in Bendigo in 1852 and played a key role in the region's quartz-mining boom. In partnership with George Gibbs, Barnet Lazarus developed a claim on the Saxby reef that reportedly yielded a net profit of £136,000 between 1864 and Barnet's death in 1880.

Lazarus was educated at Bendigo High School and, in 1883, toured Europe with his brother Samuel. This early exposure to international travel broadened his perspective and fueled his ambitions. After returning to Australia, Lazarus began managing the family's properties and became involved in mining speculation. He partnered with a syndicate to float the Prince of Wales and Frederick the Great mines. A staunch advocate for Bendigo's mining potential, he believed the region's neglected western reefs required investment from British financiers.

In 1886, Lazarus and his brothers, Samuel and Abraham, brought a legal challenge against their mother Dina and trustee William Meudell over the administration of their late father Barnet Lazarus's estate. The dispute centered on provisions in Barnet's will that had directed the accumulation of income rather than its immediate distribution. The court ruled in favor of the Lazarus brothers, declaring the income accumulation provisions void and confirming that the sons were entitled to their shares of the estate upon their father's death in 1880. As a result, £21,289 in accumulated income was distributed to the brothers, providing Daniel with his inheritance as he came of age.

== Political career ==
Lazarus was first elected as Mayor of Bendigo by the council on 18 August 1893.

The death of Legislative Assembly member for Sandhurst Robert Burrowes led to the 1893 Sandhurst colonial by-election, which Lazarus won with a majority of 109 votes. At 26 years of age he was the youngest member of the Assembly and the first member of the Assembly born in Bendigo.

He was elected unanimously for a second term as mayor in 1895 after the illness of mayor Conrad Heinz.

He lost his seat at the 1902 Victorian state election.
