= Jordan van den Lamb =

South African-Australian social media activist (born 1995)

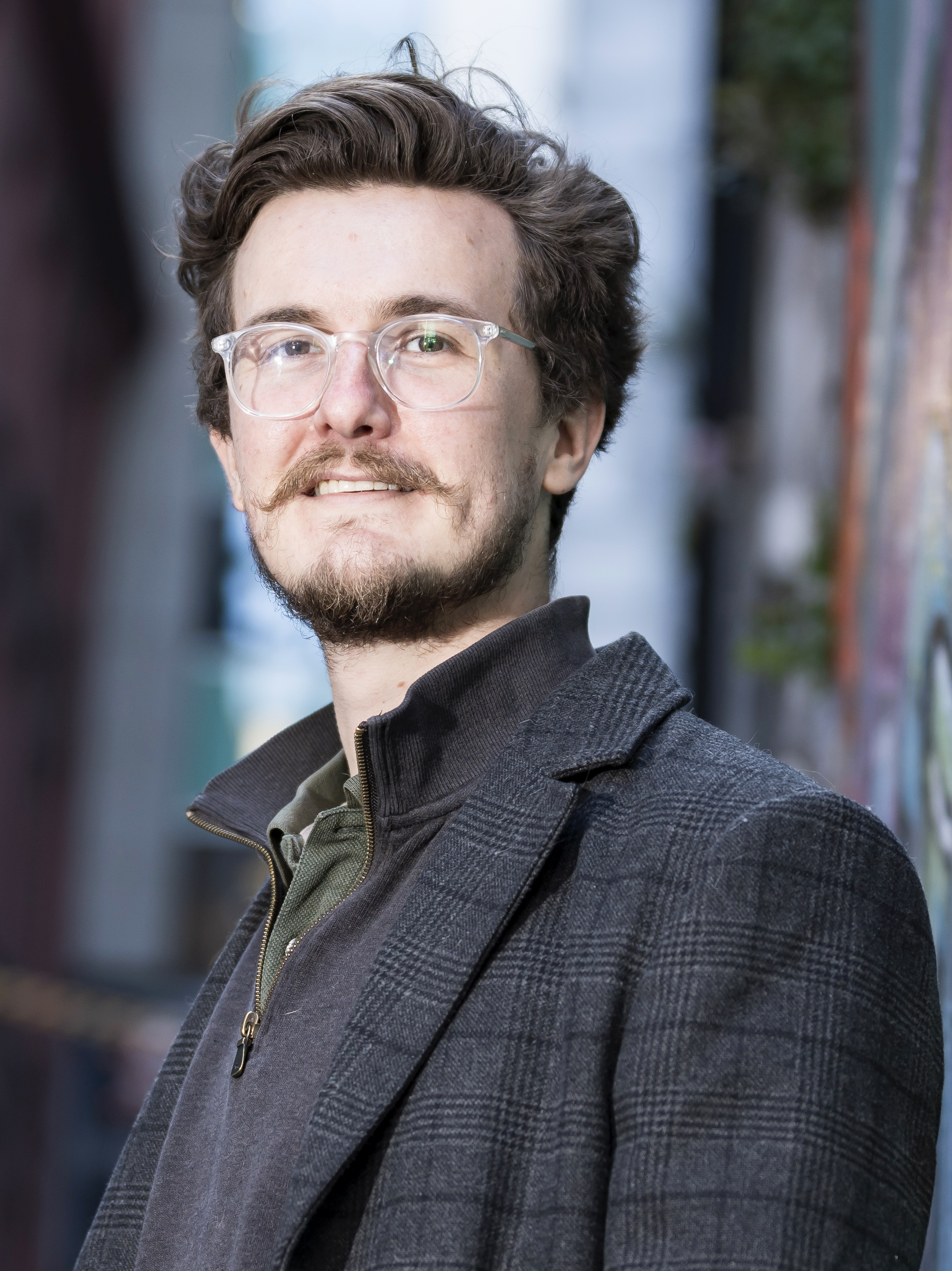
- Van den Lamb in 2024
- Born: Jordan van den Berg; 1995 (age 30–31); South Africa
- Occupations: Social media activist, political candidate
- Organisation(s): Renters and Housing Union and Community and Public Sector Union
- Known for: Housing activism
- Political party: Victorian Socialists
- Spouse: Sara Lamb (m. 2023)

Jordan van den Lamb (né van den Berg; born 1995), also known by his online alias Purple Pingers, is a South African-Australian social media activist, and socialist political candidate known for his advocacy on housing issues and tenant rights.

== Early life and education ==
Van den Lamb was born in South Africa. He created his social media handle in Year 10, choosing the name 'Purple Pingers' as a reference to ecstasy pills, although he later expressed regret about the choice. In spite of this, Van den Lamb still openly campaigned using the namesake. He studied law at university.

== Career and activism ==
Van den Lamb is active within the Australian union movement; he is a member and activist within the Community and Public Sector Union and is a supporter of democracy within unions more broadly. He is also a member of, and collaborator with the Renters and Housing Union.

Van den Lamb first gained public attention through his TikTok account, "Purple Pingers," where he posted satirical videos critiquing real estate agents and exposing substandard rental conditions in Australia. His content gained significant attention, leading to the establishment of the "Shit Rentals" database in 2023, a platform where tenants could anonymously share their experiences with poor housing conditions. In 2024, Van den Lamb expanded his focus toward more direct housing activism. He compiled and publicised a list of vacant properties, encouraging their occupation as a protest against Australia's housing crisis. He also facilitated the organisation of occupations of vacant homes through social media where he is known for his so-called "deadpan" video style.

Van den Lamb has also been involved in efforts to document long-term vacant properties, compiling a list of unoccupied homes with assistance from his followers. He has stated that this initiative aims to highlight housing inaccessibility and, in some cases, facilitate temporary shelter for individuals experiencing homelessness. Critics, including Prime Minister Anthony Albanese, landlords and real estate groups, have argued that this approach encourages trespassing, while Van den Lamb contends that his actions remain within legal boundaries and serve to draw attention to broader issues of housing affordability and vacancy.

The campaign sparked national debate. While critics expressed concerns about the legality of the initiative and its potential impact on property rights, some supporters viewed it as an act of civil disobedience aimed at addressing perceived inequalities in housing access. Van den Lamb defended the campaign, stating that it was intended to draw attention to the issue of vacant homes while advocating for changes in housing policies to address the crisis.

In 2024, Van den Lamb posted the address of a house in Victoria to his followers stating that the house was vacant and encouraging squatters to move in. Subsequently, squatters took up residence in the house, removing goods and installing a CCTV and heating system. The house had been mostly unoccupied since 2007 after the owner had died; his daughter received ownership of the house and had gradually been improving it as it was a "knock-down", but she wanted to eventually live in it. The owner was living there "a few nights" every eight weeks and had been spending "every penny" she could on improving it so she could move in. Her insurance claim relating to the squatters was denied, leaving her with A$70,000 of costs. Asked if he wanted to apologise to the owner, Van den Lamb stated "I guess so... I don't want her to feel bad".

Van den Lamb's actions were criticised by Prime Minister Anthony Albanese who described the activist as a "disgrace" who was engaging in "reprehensible, self-indulgent behaviour". He responded by calling Albanese a disgrace for not doing more to solve the housing crisis.

In October 2025, Van den Lamb started The Party Line Podcast with Victorian Socialists members Anneke Demanuele and Omar Hassan.

Van Den Lamb was ranked in 7th place on Crikey's 2024 Shitstirrer Index.

== Political candidacy ==
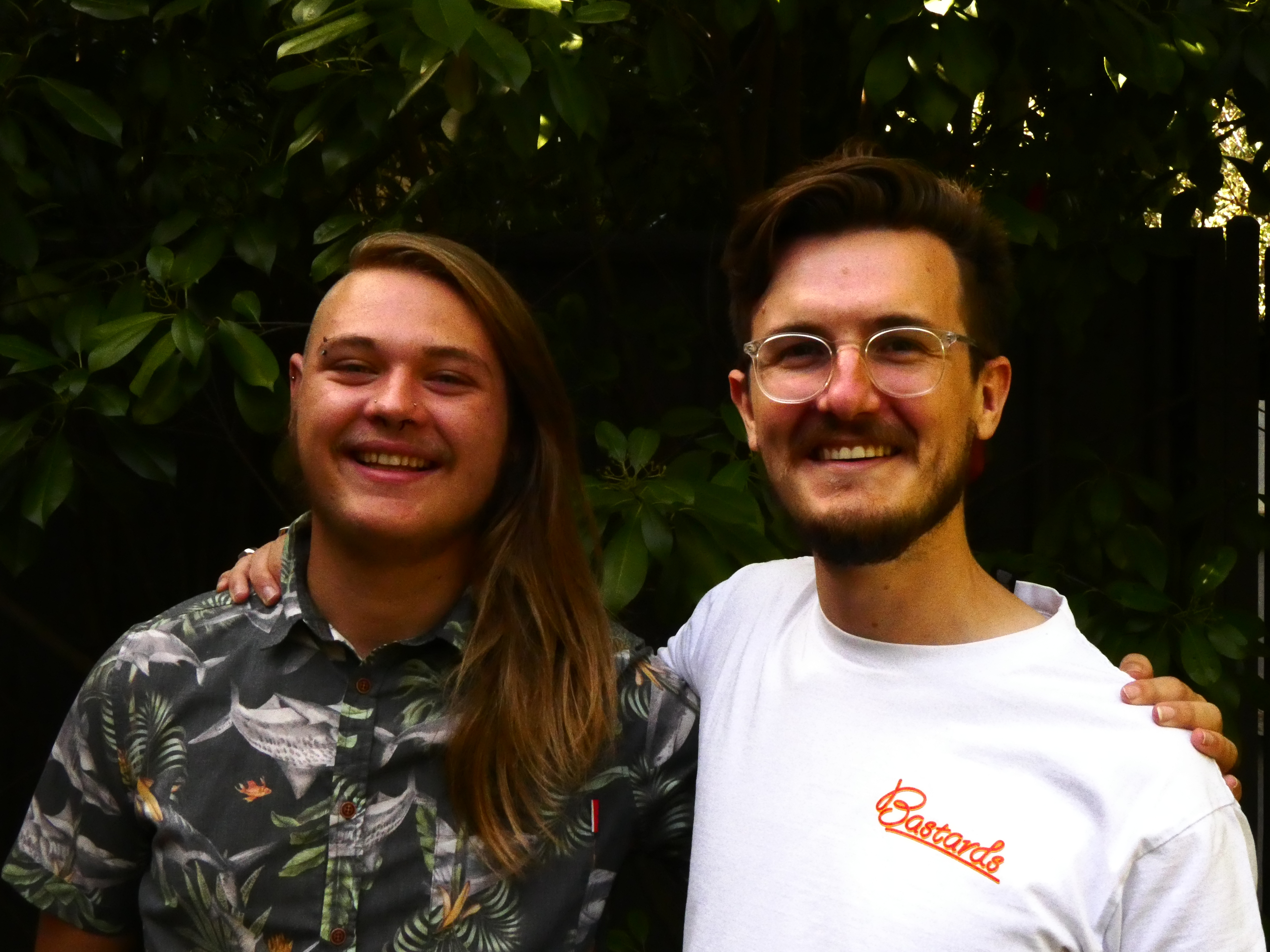
Van den Lamb (right) with Victorian Socialists Bendigo candidate Rohan Tyler campaigning in Castlemaine for the 2025 federal election

In August 2024, he announced his candidacy for the Senate in the 2025 Australian federal election for the state of Victoria, as Victorian Socialists lead Senate candidate. In his campaign, he emphasised the need for affordable housing, stronger protections for tenants, and measures to address the growing vacancy rates of residential properties in Australia. Victorian Socialists received 63,093 (1.54%) of the vote in Victoria.

Van den Lamb is running for the seat of Melbourne at the 2026 Victorian state election.

== Personal life ==
Van den Lamb married Sara Lamb in November 2023. The couple combined their surnames of Van den Berg and Lamb, both taking the name Van den Lamb.
