= Results of the 2020 Victorian local elections in Loddon Mallee =

2020 Victorian local elections (Loddon Mallee)
← 2016	24 October 2020	2024 →

This is a list of results for the 2020 Victorian local elections in the Loddon Mallee region.

Loddon Mallee has a population of around 350,000 and covers ten local government areas (LGAs), including the City of Greater Bendigo.

== Buloke ==
=== Buloke results ===
2020 Victorian local elections: Buloke
Party	Votes	%	Swing	Seats	Change
Independent	1,346	100.0		7	Steady
Formal votes	1,346	99.12			
Informal votes	12	0.88			
Total	1,358	100.00			

=== Lower Avoca ===
2020 Victorian local elections: Lower Avoca Ward
Party	Candidate	Votes	%	±%
Independent	Carolyn Stewart (elected)	678	50.37	
Independent	David Thomas Pollard (elected)	534	39.67	
Independent	Kelvin Getley	134	9.96	
Total formal votes		1,346	99.12	
Informal votes		12	0.88	
Turnout		1,358	82.91	

=== Mallee ===
2020 Victorian local elections: Mallee Ward
Party	Candidate	Votes	%	±%
Independent	Alan Ronald Getley (elected)	unopposed		
Independent	David Vis (elected)	unopposed		
Registered electors				

=== Mount Jeffcott ===
2020 Victorian local elections: Mount Jeffcott Ward
Party	Candidate	Votes	%	±%
Independent	Daryl Warren (elected)	unopposed		
Independent	Graeme Leon Milne (elected)	unopposed		
Independent	Bronwyn Simpson (elected)	unopposed		
Registered electors				
