= Thomas Prince (mayor) =

Australian politician

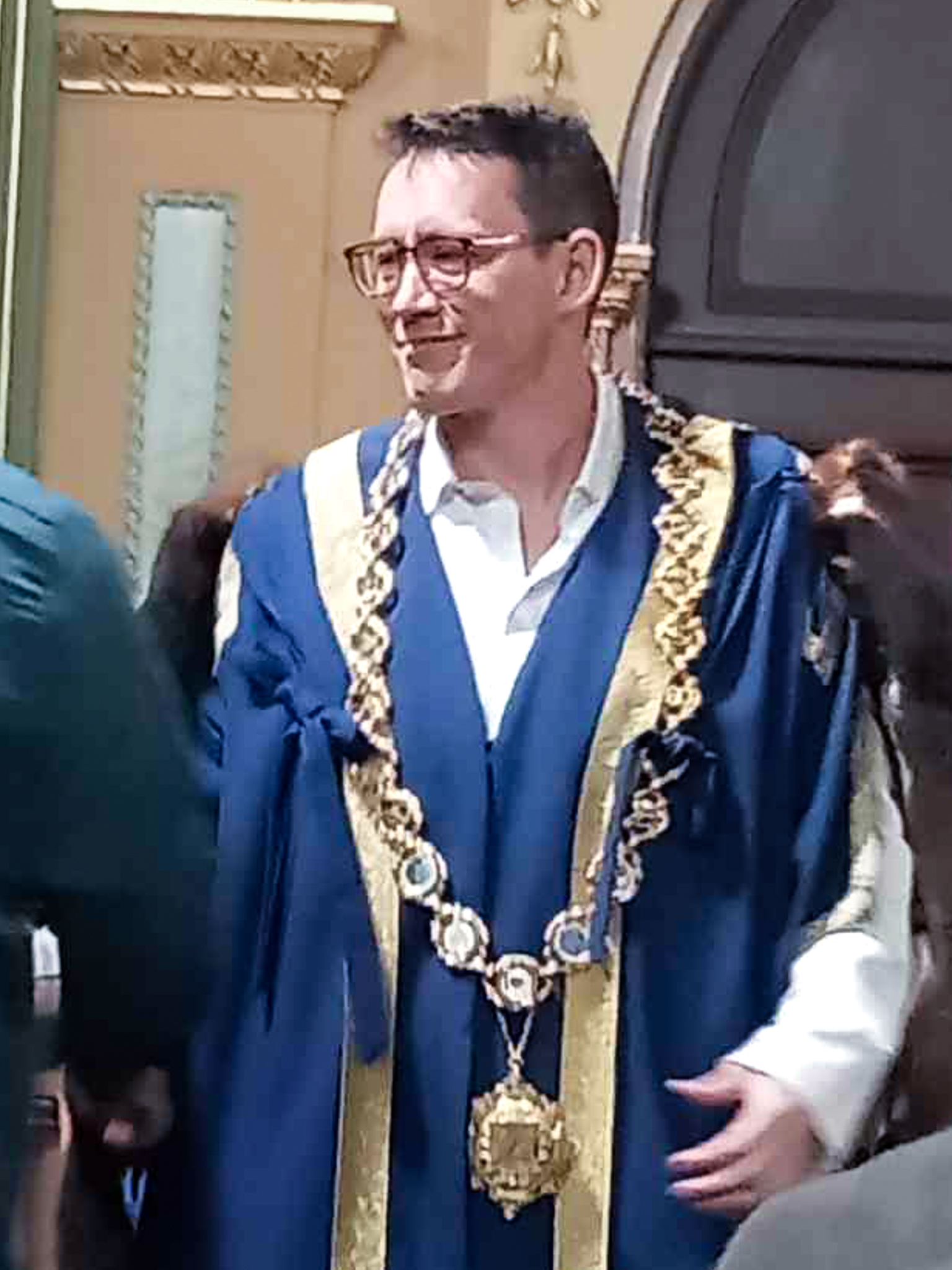

Mayor of the City of Greater Bendigo
- Incumbent
- Assumed office 10 November 2025
- Deputy: Karren Corr
- Preceded by: Andrea Metcalf

Councillor of the City of Greater Bendigo for Lake Weeroona Ward
- Incumbent
- Assumed office 2024

Personal details
- Born: c. 1990
- Party: Independent

Thomas Prince is an Australian politician and bar worker who has served as the mayor of the City of Greater Bendigo since 2025 and as a councillor since 2024.

== Political career ==
Prince contested the 2016 Victorian local elections in Whipstick Ward, coming fifth out of ten candidates and winning 11.66% of the primary vote. He ran again in the 2020 Victorian local elections, winning 11.72% of the primary vote, but was once again not successful. In the 2020 election, Prince stated that waste management was the biggest issue in the election.

Prince was elected to the Greater Bendigo City Council in the 2024 Victorian local elections where he received 54.03% of the vote in Lake Weeroona Ward. Prior to his election, Prince stated that his repeated candidacy demonstrated a commitment to "longevity and commitment to serving the people", positioning himself as a strong voice independent of political parties. He once again identified waste management and recycling as a key issue, stating that "We spend far too much money dealing with our waste", and also advocated for better infrastructure in regional areas.

In June 2025, a notice of motion was presented to council concerning the Gaza genocide by Victorian Socialists councillor Owen Cosgriff. Prince seconded a procedural move to suspend the normal rules and hold an immediate vote on the motion, foregoing any debate. He was one of four councillors who voted for this procedure. When the main motion was then voted on, Prince voted against its adoption.

In November 2025, Prince was elected as mayor by the council, with Karen Corr as his deputy. Upon his election, Prince stated that "I want to make council more open, more approachable, more grounded in real conversation."

Prince has expressed a view that partisan politics is detrimental to local government, and has advocated for a non-partisan approach to council operations with political parties playing no role.
