= Andrea Metcalf =

Bendigo politician

Councillor Andrea Metcalf

Councillor of the City of Greater Bendigo for Epsom Ward
- Incumbent
- Assumed office 15 November 2024

Mayor of the City of Greater Bendigo
- In office 2021 – 11 November 2025
- Deputy: Matthew Evans; Jennifer Alden; Abhishek Awasthi
- Preceded by: Jennifer Alden
- Succeeded by: Thomas Prince

Deputy Mayor of the City of Greater Bendigo
- In office 2020–2021
- Preceded by: Matt Emond
- Succeeded by: Matthew Evans

Councillor of the City of Greater Bendigo for Whipstick Ward
- In office 2016–2024

Personal details
- Party: Independent
- Awards: MAV's Mayor Emeritus Award (2024)

Andrea Metcalf is an Australian politician who served as the mayor of the City of Greater Bendigo from 2021 to 2025 and has served as a councillor since 2016.

== Early life and career ==
Before her election to the council, Metcalf worked for Centrelink.

== Political career ==
Metcalf was first elected to Greater Bendigo City Council in the 2016 Victorian local elections, where she received 13.21% of the primary vote in Whipstick Ward. She retained her seat at the 2020 Victorian local elections with 19.43% of the primary vote.

In 2020, Metcalf was elected as Deputy Mayor of Bendigo, serving under Mayor Jennifer Alden.

In 2021, Metcalf was elected as mayor by the council, with Matthew Evans as her deputy. She was re-elected for a second term as mayor in 2022, with former mayor Alden elected as her deputy, winning the mayoral bid against Evans. In 2023, Metcalf was selected to be on the Local Government Mayoral Advisory Panel to advise the state government on local government issues. In 2023, she was re-elected for a third term as mayor, with Evans returning as deputy.

In February 2024, Metcalf participated in an official visit to Portugal to attend the UNESCO Creative Cities Network conference, representing Bendigo in its capacity as a designated City of Gastronomy.

In the 2024 Victorian local elections, due to the introduction of single-member wards, Metcalf transferred to the Epsom Ward, which went uncontested. She was re-elected as mayor by the new council with newly elected councillor Abhishek Awasthi serving as deputy mayor.

In 2024, Metcalf received the MAV's Mayor Emeritus Award for completing three full terms as mayor.
