= Eppalock =

- Suburb
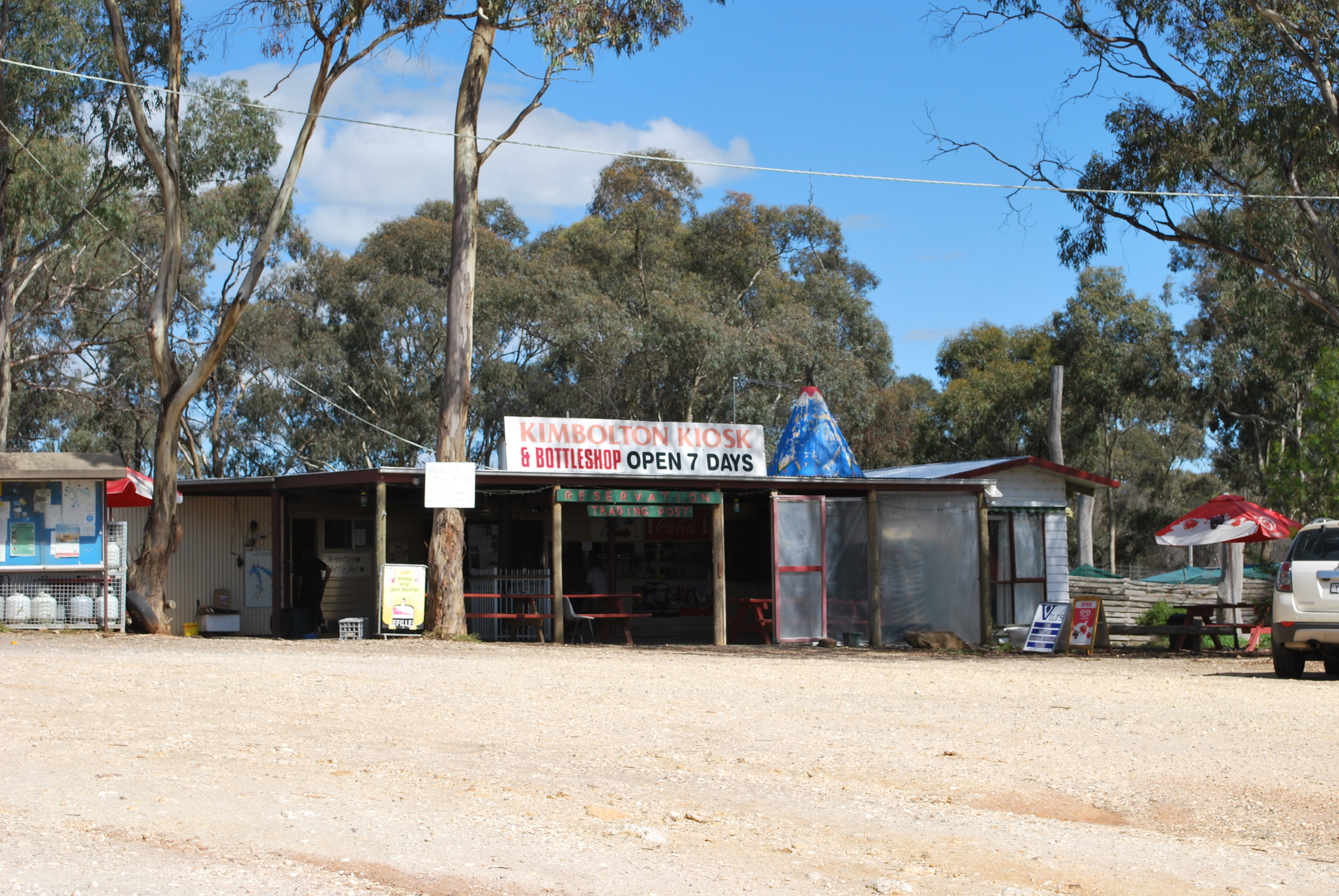
- Lake Eppalock Kiosk in 2012 (now closed)

- Interactive map of Eppalock
- Coordinates: 36°51′00″S 144°27′26″E
- Country: Australia
- State: Victoria
- City: Bendigo
- LGA: City of Greater Bendigo

Government
  - State electorate: Bendigo East
  - Federal division: Bendigo

Population
  - Total: 685 (2016 census)
- Postcode: 3551

Eppalock is a locality in the City of Greater Bendigo in the Australian state of Victoria.
