= Borough of Eaglehawk =

Coordinates: 36°44′S 144°15′E

- Local government area
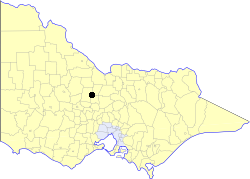
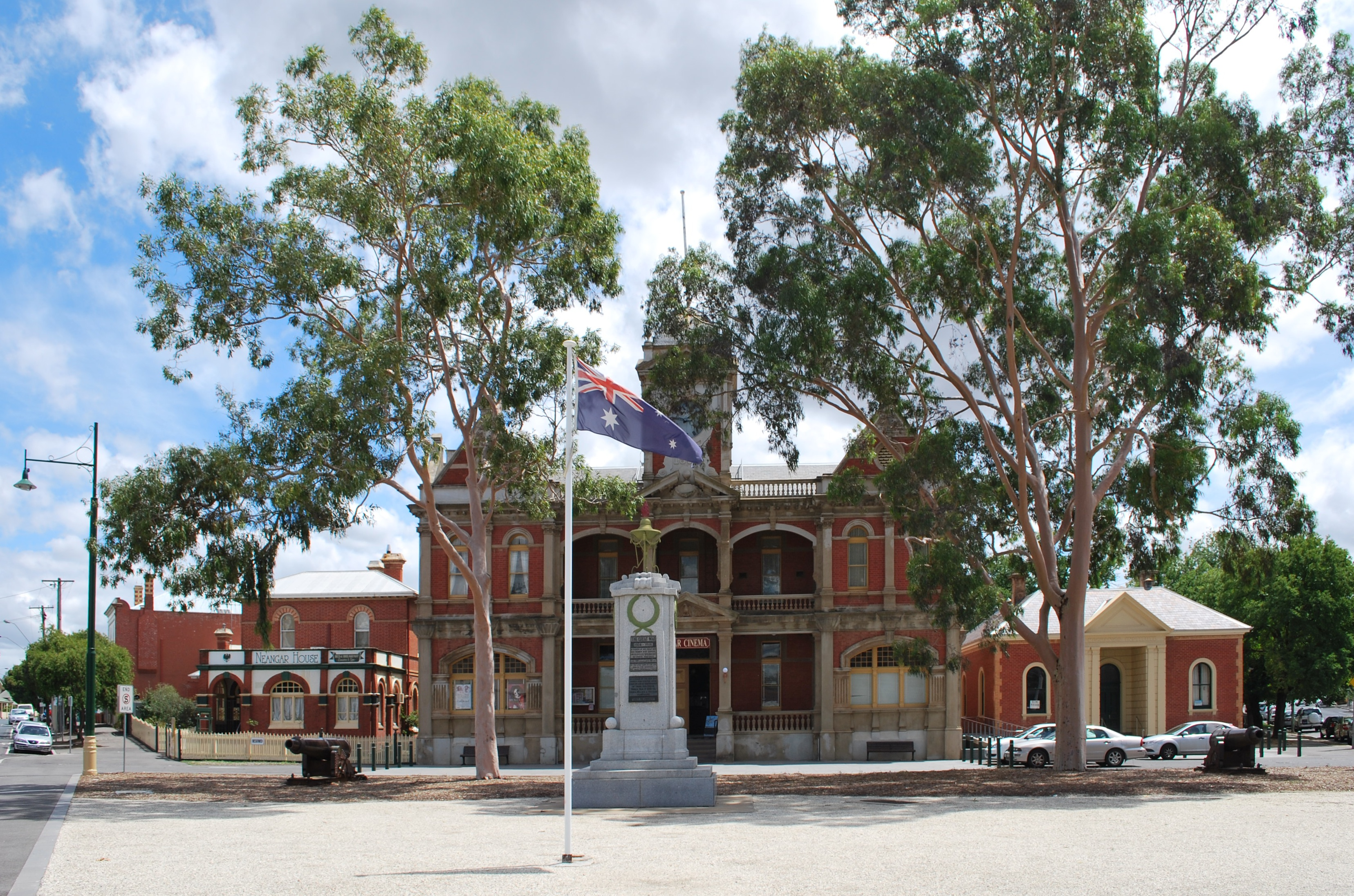
- Location in Victoria Town hall at Brassey Square

- The Borough of Eaglehawk as at its dissolution in 1994
- Country: Australia
- State: Victoria
- Region: North Central Victoria
- Established: 1862
- Council seat: Eaglehawk

Area
  - Total: 14.54 km^{2} (5.61 sq mi)

Population
  - Total(s): 8,800 (1992)
  - Density: 605/km^{2} (1,568/sq mi)
- County: Bendigo

The Borough of Eaglehawk was a local government area which covered the northwestern suburbs of the regional city of Bendigo, Victoria, Australia. The borough covered an area of 14.54 square kilometres (5.6 sq mi) and existed from 1862 until 1994.

== History ==
Eaglehawk was first incorporated as a borough on 29 July 1862. It had nine councillors, who represented the entire borough.

On 7 April 1994, the Borough of Eaglehawk was abolished and, along with the City of Bendigo, the Rural City of Marong and the shires of Huntly and Strathfieldsaye, was merged into the newly created City of Greater Bendigo.

Councillors met at the town hall, at the intersection of Sailors Gully Road and Loddon Valley Highway, Eaglehawk.

== Population ==
Year	Population
1954	4,696
1958	5,000*
1961	4,926
1966	5,230
1971	5,383
1976	6,447
1981	7,355
1986	8,184
1991	8,381

* Estimate in the 1958 Victorian Year Book.
