= Bendigo (suburb) =

- Suburb
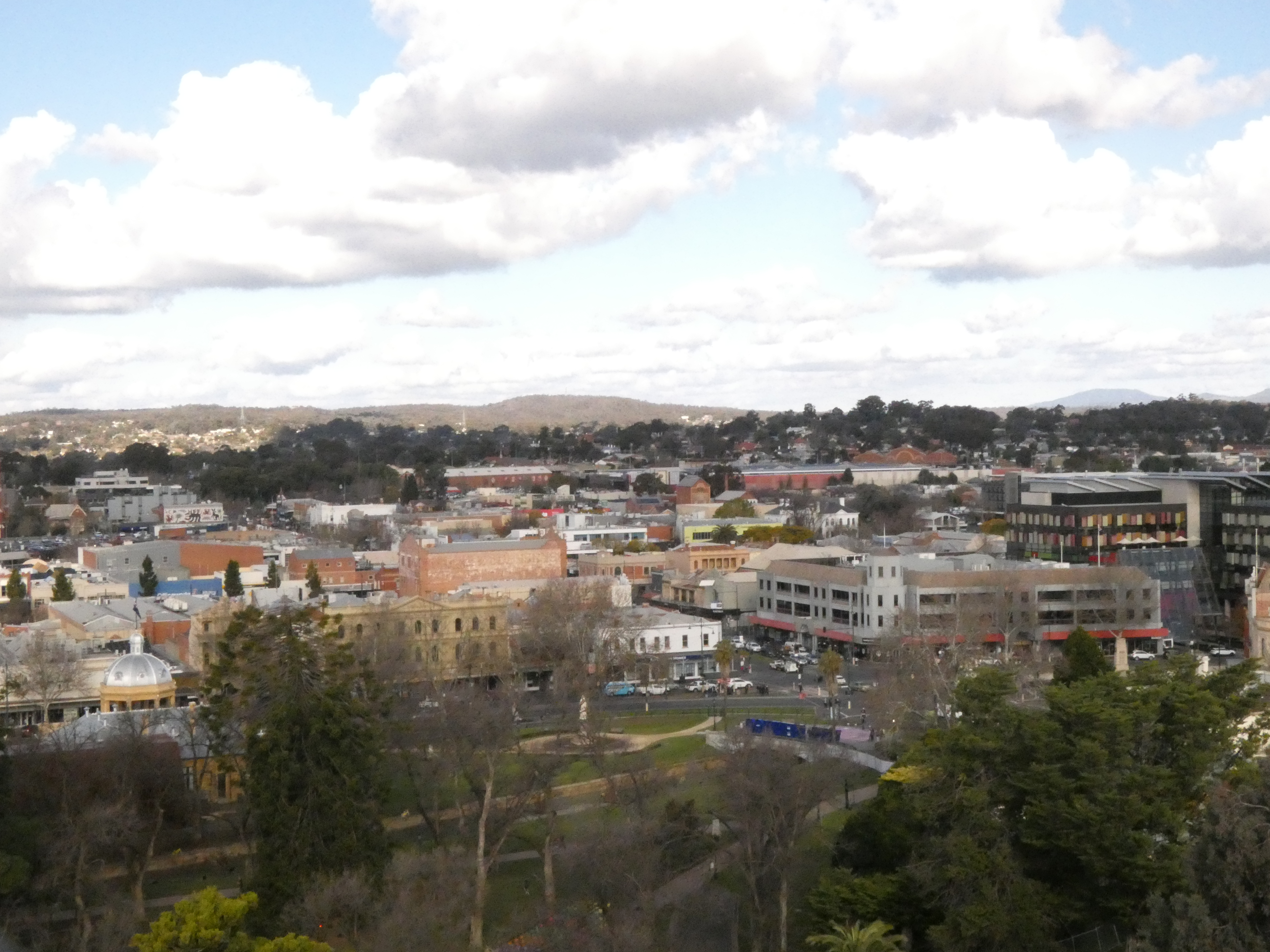
- View of central Bendigo, June 2022

- Interactive map of Bendigo
- Coordinates: 36°45′33″S 144°16′58″E
- Country: Australia
- State: Victoria
- City: Bendigo
- LGA: City of Greater Bendigo

Government
  - State electorates: Bendigo East; Bendigo West
  - Federal division: Bendigo

Population
  - Total: 5,652 (2021 census)
- Postcode: 3550

Bendigo is a suburb of the City of Greater Bendigo, Victoria, Australia. It is the central suburb of the city.

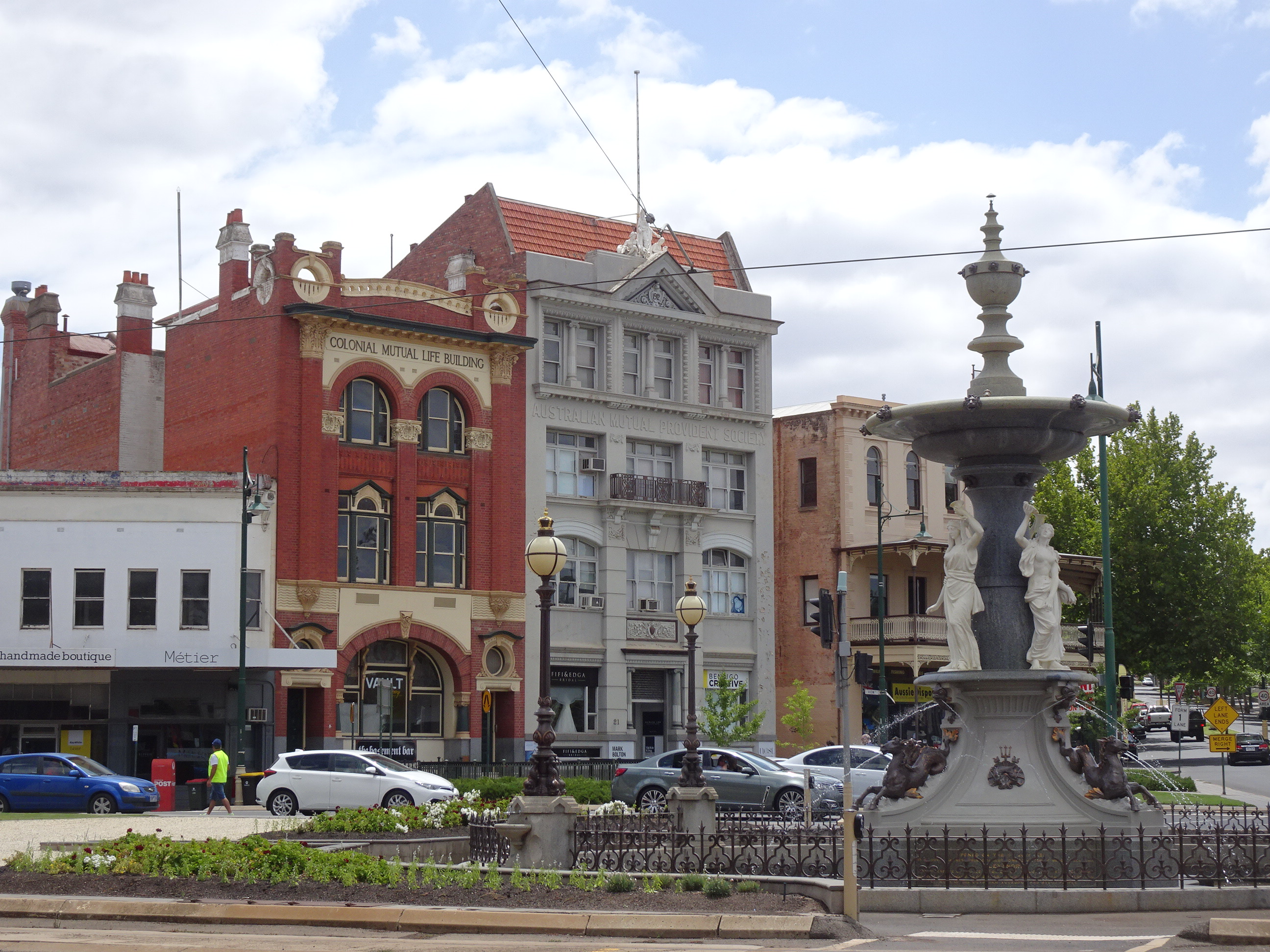
Shops in Bendigo
