= Victorian Socialists =

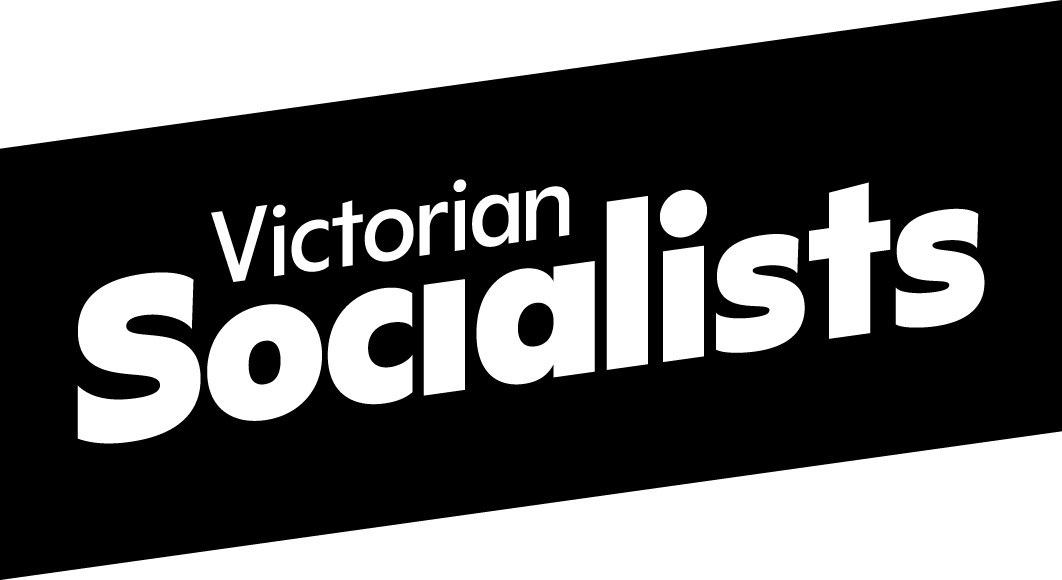
- Abbreviation: VS; VicSoc
- Leader: Collective leadership
- Secretary: Corey Oakley
- Founded: 5 February 2018; 8 years ago
- Registered: 6 June 2018; 8 years ago
- Headquarters: 83 Sydney Road, Brunswick, Melbourne, Victoria
- Membership (2025): ▲5,400 (Australia)
- Ideology: Anti-capitalism; Socialism
- Political position: Left-wing to far-left
- Colours: Black White
- Slogan: People before profit
- Branches: Cbr; NSW; NT; Qld; SA; Tas; Vic; WA
- Greater Bendigo City Council: 1 / 9

Website
- www.victoriansocialists.org.au

The Victorian Socialists (VS) are a socialist political party in the Australian state of Victoria, with plans to expand nationwide.

The party promotes a socialist platform focused on eradicating capitalism in Australia and establishing a socialist republic.

== History ==
The formation of the Victorian Socialists was announced publicly on 5 February 2018. It was officially registered by the Victorian Electoral Commission on 6 June 2018. The party began as a collaboration between Socialist Alternative and the Socialist Alliance. However, Socialist Alliance withdrew from the grouping in May 2020, citing disagreements with Socialist Alternative.

In August 2018, the party announced that it would field candidates for the 2018 Victorian state election in every Legislative Council seat and several Legislative Assembly electorates. Candidates included the former Geelong Trades Hall Secretary Tim Gooden for the Western Victoria Region and local councillors Stephen Jolly and Sue Bolton for the Northern Metropolitan Region.

The 2018 election campaign gained support from several trade unions including the ETU, VAHPA, UFU, CFMMEU (MUA division), AMIEU and NUW. It also won the support of several local immigrant diasporas and community organisations. Endorsements were received from several prominent left-wing personalities, such as Tariq Ali, Noam Chomsky, Gary Foley, Tom Ballard, Corinne Grant, and Helen Razer. The party achieved a vote of 4.2% in the Northern Metropolitan Region while achieving 7.2% of the vote for the lower house seat of Broadmeadows, in a field of four candidates.

In the 2019 federal election, VS ran candidates for the electorates of Calwell, Wills, and Cooper. The party was registered at a federal level with the Australian Electoral Commission (AEC) on 7 April 2019. The party won votes of 4.6% in Calwell, 4.5% in Wills, and 4.2% in Cooper.

Following allegations of an unspecified nature, Jolly resigned from Victorian Socialists in September 2019.

In the 2020 Victorian local government elections, the party fielded candidates for Darebin, Hume, Maribyrnong, Melbourne and Moreland, and a ticket for the Lord and Deputy Lord Mayor of Melbourne. Socialist Alternative member Jorge Jorquera became the first Victorian Socialists candidate to be elected to office, winning a seat on the Maribyrnong City Council.

VS ran candidates for the House of Representatives and the Senate in the 2022 federal election, and subsequently launched a campaign to win a seat in the 2022 Victorian state election. The party achieved a vote of 4.7% in the Northern Metropolitan Region.

Members of the party are involved in activist campaigns for a range of progressive causes. In July 2022, VS Assistant Secretary and 2022 state election candidate Liz Walsh was the organiser of large demonstrations in Melbourne, protesting the overturning of abortion rights by the United States Supreme Court, as well as calling for expanded access to abortion and increased healthcare funding in Australia.

VS ran candidates in the west and north of Melbourne for the 2022 Victorian state election, reportedly mobilising over 1000 volunteers for its campaign and knocking on over 180,000 doors. The party increased its vote from 2018, with its best result being a score of 9.3% in the seat of Footscray.

In the 2024 Victorian local elections, Victorian Socialists' Owen Cosgriff won the City of Greater Bendigo's Whipstick Ward, however the Party lost its seat on the City of Maribyrnong council.

VS ran candidates for the House of Representatives and the Senate in the 2025 federal election.

=== Nationwide expansion ===
On 13 May 2025, VS announced it intended to establish branches in all states and territories. At a conference of party members on 16 June 2025, VS confirmed its intention to change its AEC-registered name to the "Socialist Party".

Throughout mid-to-late-2025, branches were launched in New South Wales, Queensland, South Australia, Tasmania, Western Australia, the Australian Capital Territory and the Northern Territory. The SA Socialists became the first non-Victorian branch registered on 23 October 2025.

VS announced in November 2025 that its attempts to be renamed with the AEC and registered with the NSW Electoral Commission were both refused on the basis of similarity with Socialist Alliance's name, with the party instead seeking registration as the "Australian Socialist Party".

On 6 February 2026, the party was officially registered with the NSW Electoral Commission at the state level as New South Wales Soc.

The Canberra Socialists lodged a registration application with the Australian Capital Territory Electoral Commission in April 2026 and was officially registered at the territory level on 1 May 2026.

== Structure ==
The executive council is made up of four party officers and nine elected ordinary members. A party conference is held at least every two years, where the officers and executive members are elected and a political platform may be determined. According to the constitution, the preferred method of preselection of candidates is by a meeting of members of the party who live or work in that electorate (with the exception of upper house seats).

== Policies ==
=== Climate and environment ===
- Bring the energy system into public ownership and public control
- Shift to 100 percent renewable electricity by 2030 and net zero emissions by 2035
- Ban new coal, gas and oil projects and phase out existing coal power
- Provide guaranteed jobs and retraining for workers leaving fossil fuel industries
- Stop native forest logging while restoring ecosystems
- Expand public transport and increase investment in public transport

=== Cost of living and inequality ===
- Cap rents, essential service prices and reduce the cost of basic goods
- Strengthen the right to strike and collective bargaining
- Increase the minimum wage to $30 per hour

=== Housing ===
- Establish a public builder to construct one million new public homes
- Implement mandatory rentworthy checks for all rental properties

=== Public ownership ===
The Victorian Socialists want to reverse the privatisation of essential services, energy networks, and major infrastructure, seeking to rebuild public institutions to deliver services at cost rather than for profit. They want to renationalise Telstra. The Victorian Socialists want to abolish private prisons, viewing them as an exploitative industry.

=== Tax ===
- Impose a 10% wealth tax on billionaires and a 10% tax on foreign-owned billionaire assets in Australia
- Increase taxes on the gambling industry
- End public subsidies to mining corporations, banks and energy companies
- Abolish the GST
- Impose jail time for attempts to hide wealth offshore
- Impose a climate tax on major polluters

=== Workers and unions ===
Being an explicitly socialist party, the Victorian Socialists strongly advocate in favour of workers' rights and greater rights and protections for unions. The Victorian Socialists want to restore full rights for unions to organise, strike and bargain while restoring industry-wide bargaining. They want to raise the minimum wage to a liveable level, guarantee the right to retirement and pension access at age 60, and replace insecure work with stable permanent employment where possible. The Victorian Socialists run on a platform of prioritising workers over corporate profit, seeking to raise wages for the working-class through taxing billionaires and large corporations.

=== Health ===
- Expand Medicare to a universal free system including dental and mental health
- Increase public funding for hospitals, clinics and community health services
- Expand the Pharmaceutical Benefits Scheme and reduce medicine costs

=== Democracy and civil rights ===
- Protect the right to protest and repeal restrictive policing laws
- Shift resources from policing and detention to housing, healthcare and social services
- Introduce a national bill of rights

=== Anti-racism ===
- End mandatory detention and restore permanent residency pathways for refugees
- Strengthen workplace and union rights for migrant workers
- Expand settlement and multilingual community-based services
- Ensure free and accessible English-language programs

=== Politicians' pay and conduct ===
- Cap MP salaries to typical worker levels
- Ban MPs from holding certain investments and property portfolios
- Require full disclosure of financial interests
- Ban MPs from corporate board positions for ten years after leaving office

=== Banking ===
- Renationalise the Commonwealth Bank
- Use public banking to fund affordable housing loans and public investment

=== Universities ===
- Make universities and TAFE free and publicly funded
- Cancel student debt and abolish tuition fees

=== Elderly people ===
- Make the Age Pension universal, adequate and indexed
- Convert aged care into a fully public, non profit system with regulated staffing levels
- Guarantee free healthcare, dental care, housing and transport for older people
- Expand home care and community support to maintain independent living
- Increase the pensioner electricity discount to 50 percent

=== Food and nutrition ===
- Establish a publicly directed national food system
- Create an Essential Food Benefits Scheme to subsidise staple groceries
- Develop publicly owned farms and food production
- Transition agriculture to regenerative and First Nations–informed practices

== Electoral results ==
=== Federal ===
==== House of Representatives ====
Election	Votes	Victoria		Australia		+/–
Election	Votes	%	Seats	%	Seats	+/–
2019	12,453	0.34	0 / 38	0.09	0 / 151	0
2022	27,226	0.73	0 / 39	0.19	0 / 151	0
2025	23,670	0.58	0 / 39	0.15	0 / 150	0

==== Senate ====
Election	Votes	Victoria		Australia		+/–
Election	Votes	%	Seats	%	Seats	+/–
2022	21,739	0.57	0 / 12	0.14	0 / 76	0
2025	62,866	1.54	0 / 12	0.40	0 / 76	0

=== Victoria ===
Victorian Legislative Assembly
Election year	# of overall votes	% of overall vote	# of seats won	+/–
2018	15,442	0.44 (#7)	0 / 88	0
2022	48,942	1.35 (#7)	0 / 88	0
Victorian Legislative Council
Election year	# of overall votes	% of overall vote	# of seats won	+/–
2018	32,603	0.91 (#12)	0 / 40	0
2022	52,245	1.39 (#12)	0 / 40	0

== Elected representatives ==
=== Current ===
Image	Name	Office	Term start	Term end	Notes
	Owen Cosgriff	Councillor of the City of Greater Bendigo for Whipstick Ward	26 October 2024	Incumbent	
	Rob Pyne	Councillor of the Cairns Regional Council for Division 5	16 March 2024 (Elected as Independent)	Incumbent	

=== Former ===
Image	Name	Office	Term start	Term end	Notes
	Stephen Jolly	Councillor of the City of Yarra for Langridge Ward	5 February 2018	23 September 2019	Left party after membership suspended
	Jorge Jorquera	Councillor of the City of Maribyrnong for Yarraville Ward	24 October 2020	26 October 2024	Contested Burndap Ward in 2024 after Yarraville Ward abolished but lost seat

== Notable members ==
- Jeff Sparrow
- Van Thanh Rudd
- Jordan van den Lamb
- Roz Ward

== See also ==
- Socialism in Australia
