= Epsom, Victoria =

Epsom Bendigo, Victoria
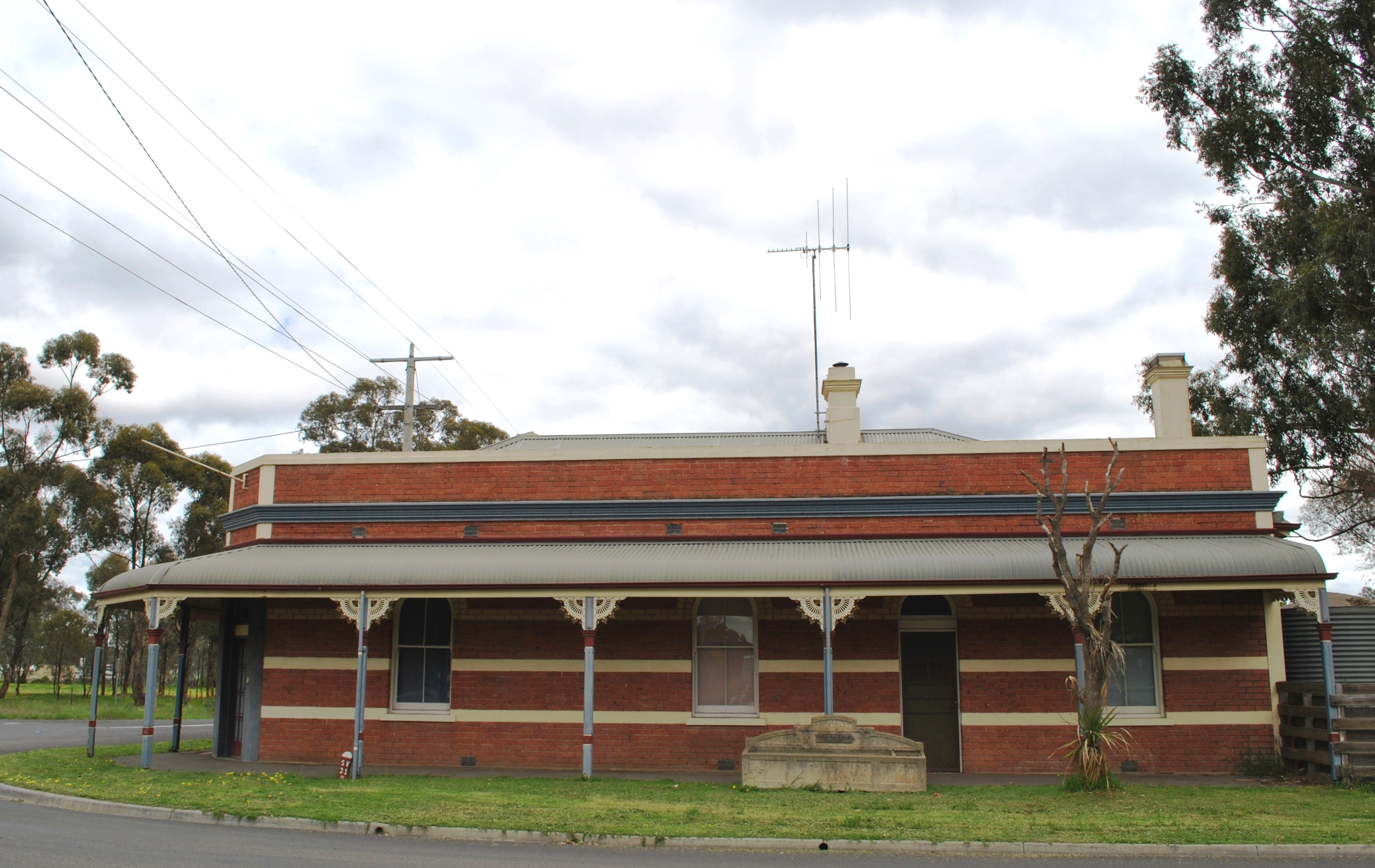
- The former Turf Club Hotel at Epsom

- Coordinates: 36°42′0″S 144°19′0″E
- Population: 5,014 (2021 census)
- Postcode(s): 3551
- Location: 7 km (4 mi) N of Bendigo
- LGA(s): City of Greater Bendigo
- State electorate(s): Bendigo East
- Federal division(s): Bendigo

Epsom is a suburb of the city of Bendigo in central Victoria, Australia. Epsom is in the City of Greater Bendigo, 7 kilometres (4.3 mi) north of the Bendigo central business district. At the 2021 census, Epsom had a population of 5,014. Epsom is named after the town of Epsom in Surrey, England.
