= S. H. McGowan =

Irish-Australian gold mine owner (c. 1844–1921)

Samuel Henry McGowan
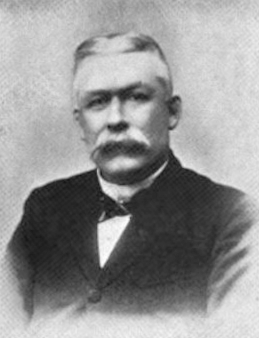

Mayor of the City of Bendigo
- In office 1899–1900

Personal details
- Born: c. 1844 Ireland
- Died: 30 May 1921
- Spouse: Kate Goyne
- Occupation: Businessman

Samuel Henry McGowan (c. 1844 – 30 May 1921) was an Australian businessman involved in gold mining ventures in Bendigo, Victoria.

== History ==
McGowan grew up in Ireland and emigrated to Australia, settling in Bendigo around 1870.

He was involved in many mining ventures: as manager South St. Mungo Gold Mining Company in July 1882, and the Old Chum Mining Company. He founded The South Energetic Company in August 1884. He founded Leech's Creek Gold Mining Company in July 1886, the Great Cornish Mining Company 1887 the Lord Hopetoun Gold Mining Company in February 1891, the North Moon Company June 1892, the Bendigo Golden Star Company August 1893, Corinella Consols Company September 1893, New North Prince of Wales Company, September 1893, North Albion Reef Gold Mining Company June 1898, and the Ashley Gold Mining Company August 1898.

He was a councillor, Barkly Ward, City of Bendigo 1883–1901 and Mayor for two terms, 1899–1900.

He was elected president, Australasian Institute of Mining and Metallurgy in 1902.

He was appointed liquidator, Bendigo Electric Tram Company in November 1899.

He was appointed Justice of the Peace for the State of Western Australia in October 1919.

He was in 1920 elected president of the Bendigo Hospital.

He was actively involved with the Manchester Unity Order of Oddfellows, and served four years as president of the management of the Bendigo United Friendly Societies' Dispensary Medical Institute.

== Family ==
McGowan married Kate Goyne (c. 1852 – 9 September 1930), elder daughter of John Goyne, an early Bendigo mining investor. She left property valued at £24,915 to various relatives and only charitable bequest was £100 to the Methodist Church, Forest street, Bendigo. They had no children.

He died on 30 May 1921.
