= Junortoun =

- Suburb
- Coordinates: 36°46′S 144°21′E
- Country: Australia
- State: Victoria
- City: Bendigo
- LGA: City of Greater Bendigo
- Location: 6 km (3.7 mi) E of Bendigo; 152 km (94 mi) NW of Melbourne

Government
  - State electorate: Bendigo East
  - Federal division: Bendigo

Population
  - Total: 3,201 (2016 census)
- Postcode: 3551
Suburbs around Junortoun
East Bendigo	Wellsford	Longlea
Strathdale	Junortoun	Longlea
Kennington		Strathfieldsaye

Junortoun is a suburb of Bendigo, Victoria, Australia. The suburb is located 6 kilometres (3.7 mi) east of the Bendigo city centre along the McIvor Highway. At the 2016 census, Junortoun had a population of 3,201.

== History ==
The original inhabitants of Junortoun were the Dja Dja Warrung people who lived throughout the Loddon Valley for thousands of years prior to European settlement. It was originally established as "Homebush", centred around the "Homebush" Estate. Homebush was an estate of some 2,000 acres extending along the valley of Splitters Creek, and was also the receiving Post Office for the district up until the early 1970s.

The name was changed to Junortoun around 1912 to avoid confusion with Homebush, New South Wales. The owner of "Homebush" estate proposed the name "Junor" after his wife's maiden name and this was submitted to the authorities. However, this name was rejected on the grounds that it was too close to "Junee" in New South Wales. At a subsequent meeting the suffix "toun" was added to "Junor" and again submitted and this was found to be acceptable.

Junortoun is one of the many localities in the region that can trip-up and tongue-tie visitors with its pronunciation. Junortoun is in fact pronounced as joo-ner-t'n.

Junortoun is surrounded by the Bendigo suburbs of East Bendigo, Strathdale, Kennington, Strathfieldsaye and the outer-rural suburbs of Longlea and Wellsford.

Today, Junortoun is a growing residential suburb, comprising a mix of low, medium and high-density residential land.

== Community facilities ==
=== Schools ===
Junortoun includes the Coolock campus of Catholic secondary school Catherine McAuley College. The campus was originally established in 1954 by the Vincentian Fathers, with governance transferring to the Marist Brothers in 1977. In 1983, governance changed again to a partnership between the Marist Brothers and the Sisters of Mercy, establishing Catholic College Bendigo (CCB). In January 2013, the campus became the sole governance of the Sisters of Mercy and, in 2018, the school was renamed as Catherine McAuley College.

=== Sporting facilities ===
Lords Raceway is home to the Bendigo Harness Racing Club and greyhound racing organised by the Bendigo Greyhound Racing Association.

=== Other facilities ===
Junortoun has a CFA station, a Baptist Church, pub and an army training base.

The O'Keefe Rail Trail runs through the suburb and is a sandy gravel trail that runs along a former branch line on the Melbourne-Sydney rail line. The disused railway track has been converted into a multi-use path, typically used for walking and cycling.
