= Margaret O'Rourke =

Australian politician and academic administrator (born 1962)

Margaret O'Rourke OAM

Mayor of the City of Greater Bendigo
- In office 2016–2020
- Deputy: Rod Fyffe; Jennifer Alden; Matt Emond
- Preceded by: Rod Fyffe
- Succeeded by: Jennifer Alden

Councillor of the City of Greater Bendigo for Eppalock Ward
- In office 2016–2024

Personal details
- Born: 1962 (age 63–64) East Bendigo, Victoria, Australia
- Party: Independent
- Children: 2, including Bryde

Margaret O'Rourke OAM (born 1962) is an Australian former politician who served as mayor of the City of Greater Bendigo from 2016 to 2020, succeeding Rod Fyffe, and as a councillor from 2016 to 2024. Since 2024, she has been head of the Bendigo campus of La Trobe University.

O'Rourke is married to former Geelong footballer Ray, with whom she has two children. Her daughter, Bryde, was drafted to Geelong AFLW as a father–daughter selection at the 2023 AFL Women's draft.

== Early life and career ==
O'Rourke was born in 1962 in East Bendigo and attended St Mary's College. In 1979, after completing Year 12, she began working at Telecom Australia (now Telstra) as a typist. Following this, O'Rourke moved to Melbourne, where she accepted a position as Learning and Development Manager for Victoria and Tasmania for Telecom. In 1994, after accepting another job, O'Rourke moved to Adelaide. From 1996 to 1999, O'Rourke worked in Perth as, among other roles, the Service Delivery Manager of Field Operations for North Perth and Mid North West. After her father became ill, O'Rourke accepted the General Manager Customer Service position in Tasmania, moving between Hobart and Bendigo to be closer to home. In 2000, she became the Area General Manager for Telstra Country Wide for Hobart and Southern Tasmanian. She left Telstra and returned to Bendigo in 2006.

After leaving Telstra, O'Rourke served on various committees, including as Chair of Bendigo TAFE, Chair of Bendigo Business Council, Director of Bendigo Health Care Group, Director of Aspire Cultural and Charitable Foundation, and Director of TasPorts.

== Political career ==
O’Rourke was first elected to the City of Greater Bendigo council in the 2016 election, where she received 16.1% of the primary vote in Eppalock Ward. She was elected by the council to serve as mayor with former Bendigo mayor Rod Fyffe serving as deputy mayor. This marked the introduction of the position of deputy mayor within the City of Greater Bendigo.

In 2017, the council re-elected O’Rourke as mayor, with councillor Jennifer Alden serving as deputy mayor. As mayor, O'Rourke advocated for the establishment of the GovHub (Galkangu) state government services hub, which streamlined public services in Bendigo. During O'Rourke's tenure as mayor, Qantas opened passenger transport flights between Bendigo Airport and Sydney, commencing in March 2019. In 2018, the council once again re-elected O'Rourke as mayor, with Fyffe returning as deputy mayor. O'Rourke was elected mayor for a final time in 2019, with councillor Matt Emond serving as deputy mayor. As mayor of Bendigo at the onset of the COVID-19 pandemic, O'Rourke led the council in managing the city's initial response. In the 2020 election, O'Rourke was re-elected to the council with 28.41% of the primary vote. In 2024, O'Rourke received the Medal of the Order of Australia for services to the community in the King's Birthday Honours List. O'Rourke chose not to contest the 2024 election.

== Post-council career ==
O'Rourke was appointed as the Head of La Trobe University's Bendigo campus in January 2024. On 18 July 2025, O'Rourke was appointed chairwoman of the Regional Development Advisory Committee (RDAC) of Victoria.

== Personal life ==
O'Rourke is Catholic. In 1994, she was diagnosed with thyroid cancer. O'Rourke met her husband, Ray, whilst working for Telecom. They have two daughters, Ireland (born 2002), and Bryde (born 2005), who was drafted to Geelong AFLW as a father–daughter selection at the 2023 AFL Women's draft.
