= Strathfieldsaye, Victoria =

Strathfieldsaye
- Suburb
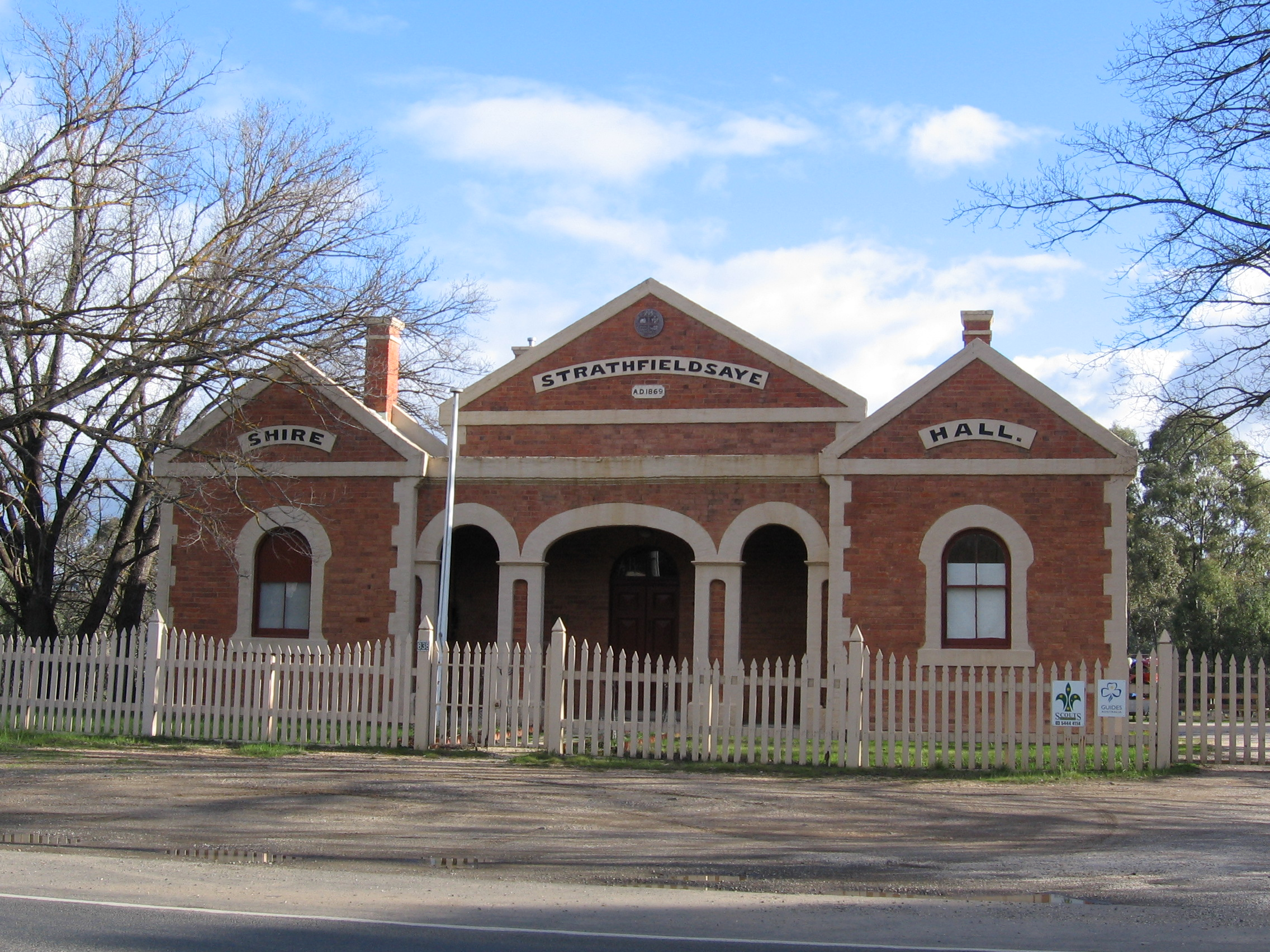
- Former shire hall

- Interactive map of Strathfieldsaye
- Coordinates: 36°48′S 144°22′E
- Country: Australia
- State: Victoria
- City: Bendigo
- Location: 9 km (5.6 mi) SE of Bendigo; 147 km (91 mi) NW of Melbourne
- Established: 1860s

Government
  - State electorate: Bendigo East
  - Federal division: Bendigo

Area
  - Total: 30 km^{2} (12 sq mi)

Population
  - Total: 6,850 (SAL 2021)
- Postcode: 3551
Suburbs around Strathfieldsaye
Strathdale	Junortoun	Longlea
Kennington	Strathfieldsaye	Eppalock
Mandurang	Emu Creek	Axe Creek

Strathfieldsaye is a suburb in the City of Greater Bendigo, Victoria, Australia. It is located 9 kilometres (5.6 mi) south-east of the Bendigo CBD. In the 2021 census, Strathfieldsaye had a population of 6,850.

== History ==
A Strathfieldsaye post office opened on 1 January 1864 and a Strathfieldsaye North office on 8 December 1876. In 1877 Strathfieldsaye was renamed Emu Creek, and Strathfieldsaye North became Strathfieldsaye A railway connected Strathfieldsaye with Bendigo between 1888 and 1958. Strathfieldsaye is one of Bendigo's outer-lying suburbs. Strathfieldsaye and its neighbouring suburbs are among some of the wealthier in Bendigo, but also more expensive to live.

Strathfieldsaye is surrounded by the Bendigo suburbs of Strathdale, Kennington, Spring Gully, Flora Hill and Junortoun, and the outer-rural suburbs of Mandurang, Emu Creek, Axe Creek, Longlea and Eppalock.

== Community facilities ==
=== Sporting facilities ===
2006 saw the commencement of a new sporting complex built in Warne Court, Strathfieldsaye which consists of netball courts, football ovals, cricket nets, cricket pitches and a functions room. This sporting complex is now the home ground of the Strathfieldsaye Storm an Australian rules football and Netball team that plays within the Bendigo Football League and the Strathfieldsaye Cricket Club competing in the Bendigo and District Cricket Association.

Strathfieldsaye Recreation Reserve in Club Court, Strathfieldsaye is home to the following local sporting clubs:

- Strathfieldsaye is represented in football (soccer) by the Strathfieldsaye Colts United Football Club;
- Strathfieldsaye Bowls Club;
- Strathfieldsaye Tennis Club; and
- Sedgewick Cricket Club.
- Strathfieldsaye Dodgers Baseball club

=== Schools ===
Strathfieldsaye includes two primary schools: St. Francis of the Fields and Strathfieldsaye Primary School. There is also a Catholic Secondary school in nearby Junortoun, Catherine McAuley College (formally Catholic College Bendigo). Strathfieldsaye also includes four kindergartens: Goodstart Early Learning, Assisi Kindergarten, Jenny's Early Learning Centre and Brady Bunch Early Learning Centre (Opening November 2019)

== Commerce ==
The Strathfieldsaye Shopping Hub on Strathfieldsaye Road is the main commercial activity centre in Strathfieldsaye, comprising a small-scale traditional shopping strip, with an IGA supermarket, post office, bakery, butcher, food take-away, pharmacy, hairdresser salon and vet clinic. There is also a petrol station, car wash, mechanic and pub in this area.
