= 1996 Ansett Australia Cup =

- AFL pre-season competition
- Season: 1996
- Teams: 16
- Winners: St Kilda (1st title)
- Matches played: 15
- Attendance: 279,200 (average 18,613 per match)
- Michael Tuck Medallist: Nicky Winmar (St Kilda)

The 1996 AFL Ansett Australia Cup was the Australian Football League competition played in its entirety before the Australian Football League's 1996 Premiership Season began. It culminated the final in March 1996. The AFL Ansett Australia Cup is also sometimes referred to as the pre-season cup because it was played in its entirety before the Premiership Season began since 1988.

== Games ==
=== Round of 16 ===
Home team	Home team score	Away team	Away team score	Ground	Crowd	Date	Time
Adelaide	18.16 (124)	Melbourne	10.5 (65)	Football Park	24,143	Friday 23 February 1996	8:00 pm
Hawthorn	9.19 (73)	St. Kilda	19.13 (127)	Waverley Park	16,061	Saturday, 24 February 1996	8:00 pm
Fremantle	7.15 (57)	West Coast	10.11 (71)	Marrara Oval	9,078	Sunday, 25 February 1996	7:05 pm
Fitzroy	12.15 (87)	Footscray	16.15 (111)	Waverley Park	4,818	Monday, 26 February 1996	8:00 pm
Collingwood	14.10 (94)	Richmond	8.14 (62)	Waverley Park	13,307	Wednesday 28 February 1996	8:00 pm
Sydney	20.8 (128)	North Melbourne	22.18 (150)	Bruce Stadium	9,405	Saturday, 2 March 1996	2:00 pm
Carlton	14.12 (96)	Essendon	8.14 (62)	Waverley Park	23,837	Saturday, 2 March 1996	8:00 pm
Brisbane	14.25 (109)	Geelong	9.9 (63)	The Gabba	18,325	Monday, 4 March 1996	7:00 pm

=== Quarter-finals ===
Home team	Home team score	Away team	Away team score	Ground	Crowd	Date	Time
Adelaide	11.10 (76)	St. Kilda	18.11 (119)	Football Park	21,276	Sunday, 3 March 1996	8:00 pm
West Coast	11.6 (72)	Footscray	8.10 (58)	Waverley Park	3,109	Wednesday, 6 March 1996	8:00 pm
Collingwood	15.9 (99)	Carlton	16.8 (104)	Waverley Park	33,359	Saturday, 9 March 1996	8:00 pm
North Melbourne	15.15 (105)	Brisbane	13.12 (90)	The Gabba	13,269	Sunday, 10 March 1996	7:00 pm

=== Semi-finals ===
Home team	Home team score	Away team	Away team score	Ground	Crowd	Date	Time
St. Kilda	10.13 (73)	West Coast	8.9 (57)	Waverley Park	10,019	Wednesday 13 March 1996	8:00 pm
Carlton	10.12 (72)	North Melbourne	5.14 (44)	Waverley Park	12,306	Saturday, 16 March 1996	8:00 pm

=== Final ===
Home team	Home team score	Away team	Away team score	Ground	Crowd	Date	Time
St. Kilda	20.10 (130)	Carlton	10.12 (72)	Waverley Park	66,888	Saturday 23 March 1996	8:05 pm

== Knock-Out Chart ==
Round Of 16
Adelaide	124
Melbourne	65
Hawthorn	73
St. Kilda	127
Fremantle	57
West Coast	71
Fitzroy	87
Footscray	111
Collingwood	94
Richmond	62
Carlton	96
Essendon	54
Sydney	128
North Melbourne	150
Brisbane	109
Geelong	63

Quarterfinals
Adelaide	76
St. Kilda	119
West Coast	72
Footscray	58
Collingwood	99
Carlton	104
North Melbourne	105
Brisbane	90

Semifinals
St. Kilda	73
West Coast	57
Carlton	72
North Melbourne	44

Final
St. Kilda	20	10	130
Carlton	10	12	72

== Scorecard ==
St Kilda vs Carlton
Team	Q1	Q2	Q3	Final
St Kilda	6. 5. (41)	10. 7. (67)	17. 8. (110)	20.10 (130)
Carlton	2. 3. (15)	6. 6. (42)	8. 9. (57)	10.12 (72)
Venue:		Waverley Park, Melbourne		
Date:		Saturday, 23 March 1996		
Attendance:		66,888		
Umpires:		Peter Carey, Bryan Sheehan, Mark Nash		
Goal scorers:	St. Kilda	Loewe 6, Everitt 3, Smith 2, Brown, Burke, Winmar, Sziller, McLaren, Beveridge, Jones, Traianidis, Daniels		
Goal scorers:	Carlton	Kernahan 4, Pearce 3, Heaver, Sexton, Hogg		
Best:	St. Kilda	Winmar, Loewe, Everitt, Harvey, Vidovic		
Best:	Carlton	Ratten, Kernahan		
Reports:				
Injuries:				
Coin toss winner:				
Michael Tuck Medal:		Nicky Winmar, St. Kilda		
Australian television broadcaster:		Seven Network		
National Anthem:		Kevin Johnson		

== 1996 AFL Ansett Australia Cup final Teams ==
=== St Kilda Football Club ===
St Kilda Football Club 1996 AFL AA Cup final Team
Justin Peckett	Tony Brown	Nathan Burke (Co-Captain)
Joel Smith	Nicky Winmar	Lazar Vidovic
Peter Everitt	David Sierakowski	Kristian Bardsley
Darryl Wakelin	Robert Neill	Steven Sziller
Stewart Loewe (Co-Captain)	Joe McLaren	Luke Beveridge
Jamie Elliott	Austinn Jones	Jamie Shanahan
Jason Traianidis	Jayson Daniels	Robert Harvey
Andrew McLean		Coach Stan Alves

=== Carlton Football Club ===
Team
Steven Silvagni	Stephen Kernahan (Captain)	Brett Ratten
Craig Devonport	Adrian Hickmott	Earl Spalding
Michael Sexton	Tony Lynn	Scott Camporeale
Brent Heaver	Justin Murphy	Brad Pearce
Fraser Brown	Glenn Manton	Dean Rice
Matthew Allan	Ben Sexton	Adrian Whitehead
Matthew Hogg	Ang Christou	Anthony Koutoufides
Justin Madden		Coach David Parkin

== Final Placings ==
1. St Kilda
2. Carlton
3. West Coast
4. North Melbourne
5. Collingwood
6. Brisbane
7. Footscray
8. Adelaide
9. Sydney
10. Fremantle
11. Fitzroy
12. Richmond
13. Essendon
14. Geelong
15. Hawthorn
16. Melbourne

== See also ==
- List of Australian Football League night premiers
- 1996 AFL season
