= Jennifer Harris =

Jennifer Harris may refer to:

- Jennifer M. Harris, scholar and former US government official
- Jennifer Harris (basketball), American basketball player
- Jennifer Harris (rugby union), Australian rugby union player
- Jennifer Harris Trosper, American aerospace engineer
- Jenniferharris, a minor planet named for the aerospace engineer
