= Rod Fyffe =

Bendigo politician and teacher (1949–2024)

Rod Fyffe OAM

Mayor of the City of Greater Bendigo
- In office 2003–2004
- Preceded by: Willi Carney
- Succeeded by: Greg Williams
- In office 2004–2005
- Preceded by: Greg Williams
- Succeeded by: David Jones
- In office 2010–2011
- Preceded by: Rod Campbell
- Succeeded by: Alec Sandner
- In office 2015–2016
- Preceded by: Peter Cox
- Succeeded by: Margaret O'Rourke

Deputy Mayor of the City of Greater Bendigo
- In office 2016–2017
- Preceded by: Office Established
- Succeeded by: Jennifer Alden

Councillor of the City of Greater Bendigo for Lockwood Ward
- In office 2012–2024

Councillor of the City of Greater Bendigo for Golden Square Ward
- In office 2004–2012

Councillor of the City of Greater Bendigo for Fortuna Ward
- In office 1996–2004

Councillor of the City of Bendigo for Sutton Ward
- In office 1983–1994

Personal details
- Born: 20 March 1949 Warracknabeal, Victoria, Australia
- Died: 12 July 2024 (aged 75) Bendigo, Victoria, Australia
- Party: Independent
- Education: Monash University (BEc); University of Edinburgh (BA)
- Occupation: Teacher
- Awards: Mayor Emeritus (2012); MAV Victorian Councillor 35 Years' Service Award (2022)
- Nickname: The Mayor with the Hair

Rodney James Fyffe OAM (20 March 1949 – 12 July 2024) was an Australian politician and teacher. From 2003 to 2016, Fyffe served non-consecutively as the Mayor of the City of Greater Bendigo on four occasions. Fyffe served as a Bendigo councillor from 1983 to his death in 2024. He was also a teacher at Bendigo Senior Secondary College from 1979 to 2011.

== Early life and career ==
Fyffe was born on 20 March 1949 in Warracknabeal, Victoria. He attended primary school in Cannum and Caramut, before going to high school in Hamilton. After finishing high school, Fyffe went on to study at Monash University, where he graduated with a Bachelor of Economics, majoring in mathematics, statistics and economics. After undertaking a Diploma of Education, Fyffe went on to teach at Mansfield High School, before departing for Scotland in 1975 for further studies at the University of Edinburgh, where he studied a Bachelor of Arts, majoring in archaeology, geology, geophysics and fine art.

Fyffe returned to Australia in 1979 and began teaching at Bendigo Senior High School, where he taught until 2011.

Outside of politics, Fyffe was associated with the Bendigo Art Gallery and had a gallery space named for him. He served as a board member of the Municipal Association of Victoria (MAV) and the Goldfields Libraries, and was a member of the Bendigo Easter Fair Committee. Fyffe served on the committee of the Golden Square Football Netball Club, in addition to acting as the club's secretary and as a canteen assistant shortly before his death. He was a member of the Bendigo Field Naturalists Club.

== Political career ==
Fyffe first stood for election in the City of Bendigo's Darling Ward in 1982, where he was defeated by 41 votes by incumbent councillor and former mayor Joseph Patrick Pearce. He ran again in Sutton Ward in 1983, where he was elected on preferences. He was re-elected with an absolute majority in the 1986 election.

Fyffe was first elected as mayor of the City of Greater Bendigo council in 2003. He took time off from his teaching position to serve as mayor. He was elected a second time by the council in 2004. He was elected a third time in 2010. In his fourth and final stint as mayor (2015–2016), Fyffe was in office during the Bendigo Mosque protests. The protests began when, under the previous mayor, Barry Lyons, the council voted 7–2 to allow a mosque to be built in Bendigo. Opponents of the mosque attempted to appeal against the construction to the High Court of Australia, but the appeal was dismissed, allowing construction to proceed, an outcome which was praised by Fyffe.

In 2016, he was elected as deputy mayor, serving under mayor Margaret O'Rourke until 2017. He served once again as deputy mayor from 2018 until 2019. In 2020, Fyffe made another bid for mayor but was unsuccessful, losing to Jennifer Alden.

At the time of his death, Fyffe had served thirty-eight years as Bendigo councillor, having joined the City of Bendigo council in 1983. He was mayor of Bendigo four times and deputy mayor twice.

== Personal life ==
Fyffe was of Scottish descent. He married his wife, Victoria, whilst in Scotland, adopting her two children from a previous marriage as his own.

== Death ==
A few days before his death, Fyffe met with councillors of the City of Greater Bendigo to submit a self-written eulogy, detailing his experiences as a Bendigo councillor. He died after a long illness on 12 July 2024, at the age of 75. Fyffe received tributes from mayor Andrea Metcalf, federal member for Bendigo Lisa Chesters, state member for Bendigo West Maree Edwards, and Victorian premier Jacinta Allan (state member for Bendigo East), among others. His funeral took place on 24 July 2024 at the Bendigo Town Hall.

== Awards and recognition ==
In 2012, Fyffe was given Mayor Emeritus status by the MAV for his three mayoral terms. In the 2013 Queen's Birthday Honours, Fyffe was awarded the Medal of the Order of Australia (OAM) for service to local government, and to the community. Fyffe was the recipient of the MAV Victorian Councillor Service Award, being included in the 35 Years' Service category in 2022.

The 7 November 2012 edition of the Bendigo Advertiser was dedicated to Fyffe, whose third term as mayor had ended that day. In 2019, Fyffe appeared on a mural celebrating the history of Bendigo. In April 2025, Fyffe was honoured at the Bendigo Easter Festival, being the namesake for that year's torchlight procession. Fyffe was noted as being "among one of the most recognisable of Bendigo's residents", and was often dubbed "The Mayor with the Hair" by local media.
