= Board of Bendigo Regional Institute of Technical and Further Education v Barclay =

Judgement of the High Court of Australia

Board of Bendigo TAFE v Barclay
- Court: High Court of Australia
- Decided: 7 Sep 2012
- Citations: [2012] HCA 32; 86 ALJR 1044; 248 CLR 500

Court membership
- Judges sitting: French CJ, Gummow, Hayne, Heydon, Crennan JJ

Case opinions
- Appeal allowed Dr Harvey's testimony established that adverse action wasn't taken for a prohibited reason French CJ & Kiefel J Gummow J & Hayne J Heydon J

Board of Bendigo TAFE v Barclay is an Australian labour law case, decided by the High Court of Australia on the Fair Work Act's section 346 protections against adverse action for participation in industrial activities. It concerned the dismissal of an employee of Bendigo TAFE. The employee was a member of the Australian Education Union (AEU) and was suspended after having sent an email from his work computer to all AEU members employed at Bendigo TAFE. Management then suspended him for not having notified them of serious instances of fraud discussed within that email.

== Facts ==
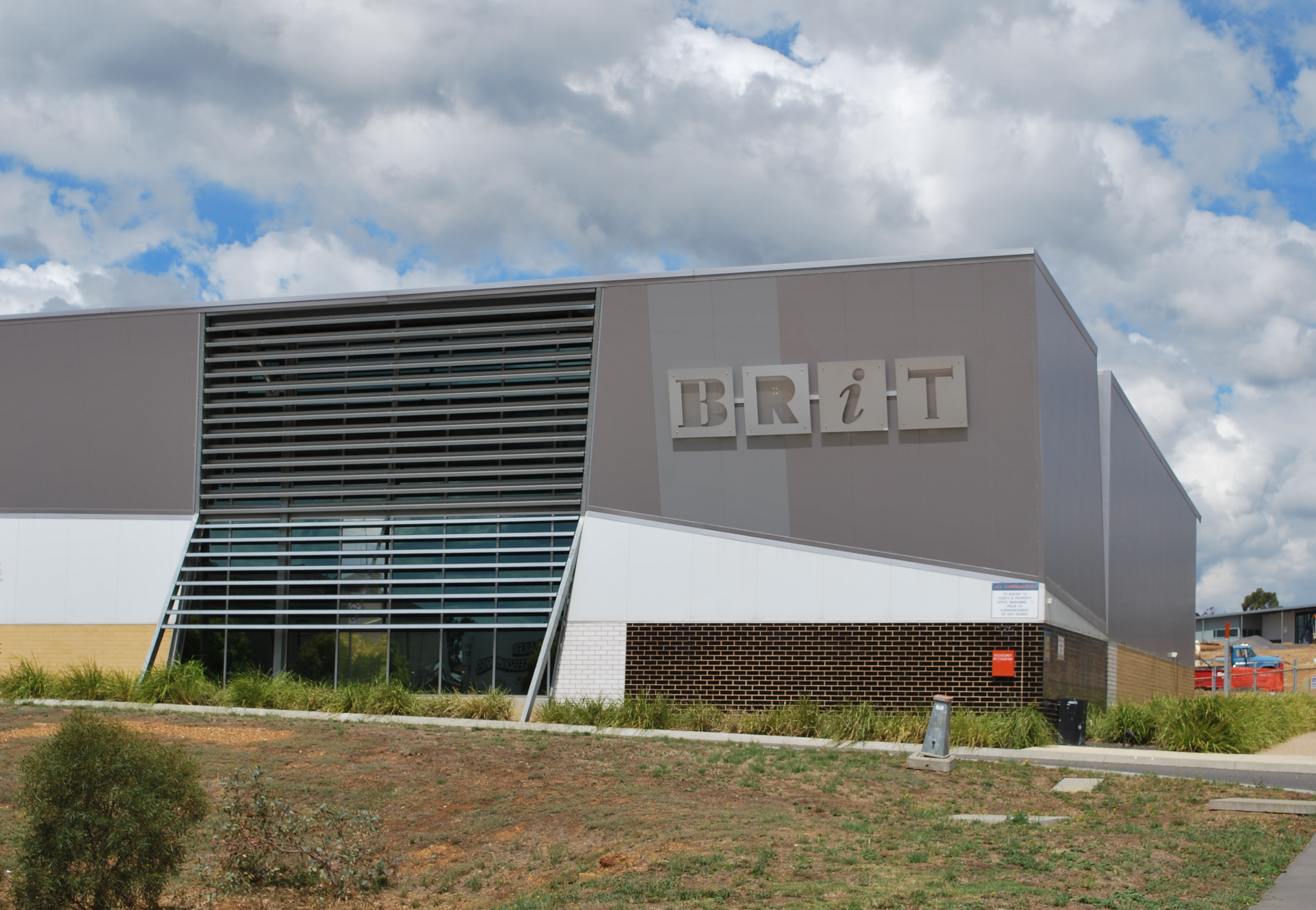
Pictured: A Bendigo TAFE building on the campus at East Bendigo, Victoria

Greg Barclay was an employee of Bendigo TAFE. He was also president of an AEU sub-branch. He sent an email to all AEU members employed by Bendigo TAFE, stating that several AEU members had reported witnessing or being asked to take part in producing fraudulent documents as part of an audit.

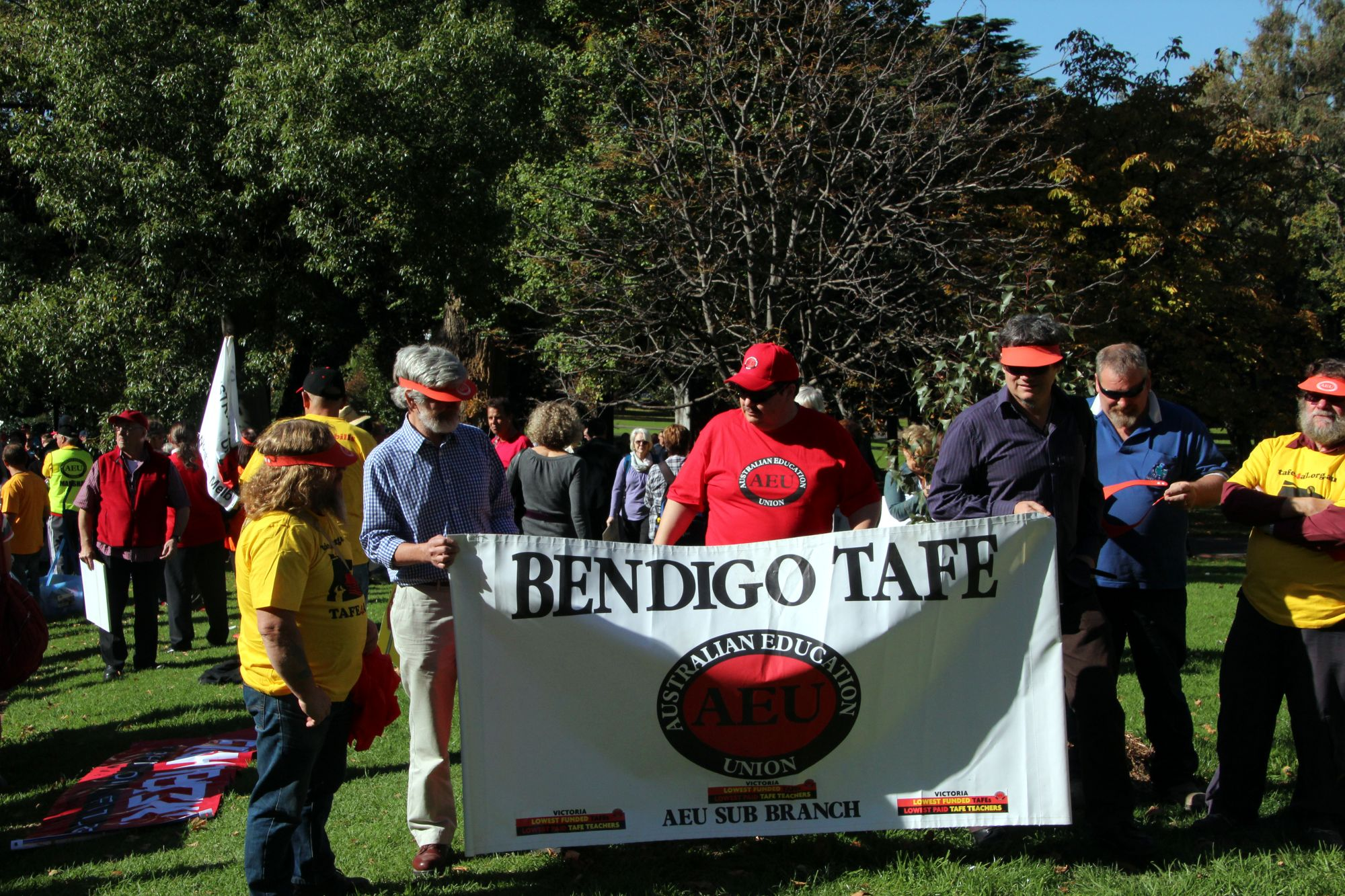
Pictured: A photograph taken in May 2012 of AEU members undertaking a rally at Bendigo TAFE. The rally was undertaken for reasons unrelated to the TAFE's adverse actions against Barclay.

A senior manager at the TAFE asked Barclay to provide the names of the members who Barclay had referred to in his email. Barclay refused. The CEO of Bendigo TAFE, Dr Harvey, then suspended Barclay.

== Judgment ==
=== At first instance ===
Barclay and the AEU applied to the Federal Court for a declaration. They sought to establish that the TAFE had taken adverse action against Barclay for engaging in industrial activity, in breach of the Fair Work Act.

Under the Fair Work Act, Bendigo TAFE bore the onus of proof to establish that their reason for taking an adverse actions did not include a prohibited reason under s346 of the act. (Note: This onus arises from s361 of the Fair Work Act)

Dr Harvey gave evidence that she considered an investigation into Barclay's actions were necessary because he had failed to notify management of serious allegations of fraud; and that he had instead cast aspersions and innuendo on colleagues. She said she regarded this to be in breach of Bendigo TAFE's Code of Conduct. She said she did not object to Barclay raising the issue of fraud with AEU members, and that she had taken action against Barclay instead for his failure for having raised such a serious issue with senior management. She said she would have taken the same action in similar circumstances against a person unrelated to the AEU.

Tracey J dismissed the application after accepting the evidence of Dr Harvey as establishing a lack of a prohibited reason.

=== Full Federal Court ===
A majority of the Full Court, Gray and Bromberg JJ, upheld the respondent's appeal from the primary judge's decision. Lander J dissented.

Bendigo TAFE obtained special leave to appeal with the High Court.

=== High Court ===
The High Court unanimously upheld Bendigo TAFE's appeal in three separate judgements. On the evidence, the court held, Barclay's union position and activities were not operative factors in the decision to take adverse action. It was also noted by Gummow and Hayne JJ that Dr Harvey's evidence had not been challenged, and therefore a contravention of s346 could not be made out.

However, the court noted that positive evidence from a decision maker may be unreliable, because of other contradictory evidence. However, this was not found to be the case on the facts before the court.

The court additionally found that in regards to s346, it is the state of mind of the decision maker that is of relevance. Surrounding circumstances are only relevant insofar as they assist in elucidating that state of mind to the court.

== See also ==
- Australian labour law
- CFMEU v BHP Coal Pty Ltd
- Industrial action
