= Bryde O'Rourke =

Australian rules footballer (born 2005)

Personal information
- Born: 28 November 2005 (age 20); Bendigo, Victoria
- Original team: Strathfieldsaye (BFL)
- Draft: 23
- Height: 174 cm (5 ft 9 in)
- Position: Forward

Club information
- Current club: Geelong
- Number: 23

Playing career^{1}
Years	Club	Games (Goals)
2024–	Geelong	6 (0)
- ^{1} Playing statistics correct to the end of the 2025 season.

Bryde O'Rourke (born 28 November 2005) is an Australian rules footballer who plays for Geelong in the AFL Women's (AFLW).

Born and raised in Bendigo to Margaret O'Rourke, former mayor of the city of Greater Bendigo, and former Geelong footballer Ray O'Rourke, O'Rourke played her junior football with Bendigo Football League (BFL) club Strathfieldsaye and Bendigo Pioneers in the Coates Talent League, and was selected in the Vic Country representative team at the 2023 Under-19s National Championships.

O'Rourke was drafted as a father-daughter selection by Geelong Football Club with pick 23 at the 2023 AFL Women's draft. She made her senior debut in Week 6a of the 2024 AFLW season, subsequently suffering a collarbone injury, which ruled her out for the remainder of the season.

== Early life ==
O'Rourke was born on 28 November 2005 in Bendigo, Victoria, as the youngest of two daughters to Margaret O'Rourke, former mayor of the city of Greater Bendigo, and former Geelong footballer Ray. O'Rourke played junior football with Bendigo Football League (BFL) club Strathfieldsaye and Bendigo Pioneers in the Coates Talent League, the statewide Under 19s competition. Her form led to her selection for Vic Country at the 2023 Under 19s National Championships.

== AFLW career ==
O'Rourke was taken as a father-daughter selection by Geelong Football Club with pick 23 at the 2023 AFL Women's draft. She made her senior debut in Week 6a of the 2024 AFLW season, 55 years after her father last played in the VFL. In doing so, she broke the record for the longest gap between a parent's last game and their child's first game, which was previously held by Gerry and Damian Sexton, with a less than 45-year gap. Playing against Fremantle at GMHBA Stadium, O'Rourke injured her collarbone early in the match, ruling her out for the remainder of the season.
