= Barry Lyons =

Barry Lyons may refer to:

- Barry Lyons (baseball) (born 1960), former Major League Baseball catcher
- Barry Lyons (footballer) (born 1945), English former footballer and manager
- Barry Lyons (mayor) (1945–2024), Australian politician
- Barry Lyons, musician in Trees (band)
