= Ray O'Rourke (footballer) =

Australian rules footballer (born 1948)

Personal information
- Full name: Raymond O'Rourke
- Born: 11 January 1948 (age 78)
- Original team: Hobart (TANFL)
- Height: 182 cm (6 ft 0 in)
- Weight: 80 kg (176 lb)

Playing career^{1}
Years	Club	Games (Goals)
1969	Geelong	2 (0)
- ^{1} Playing statistics correct to the end of 1969.

Ray O'Rourke (born 11 January 1948) is a former Australian rules footballer who played with Geelong in the Victorian Football League (VFL).

O'Rourke was recruited from Hobart Football Club, making his senior debut for Geelong in round one of the 1969 VFL season.

O'Rourke is married to Margaret O'Rourke, a former mayor of the city of Greater Bendigo, with whom he has two daughters, Ireland and Bryde, who was drafted to Geelong AFLW under the father-daughter rule at the 2023 AFL Women's draft.

== Career ==
O'Rourke was recruited from Tasmanian Australian National Football League (TANFL) club Hobart. He made his senior VFL debut for Geelong in round one of the 1969 VFL season, against Melbourne at Kardinia Park. O'Rourke had two possessions, and, playing against Essendon at Windy Hill in Round 2, injured his knee and was not picked in Geelong's senior side again. O'Rourke played the rest of the season for Geelong's reserves side before returning to Tasmania.

== Personal life ==
O'Rourke lives in Bendigo with his wife Margaret, a former mayor of the city of Greater Bendigo, and his daughters Ireland (born 2002) and Geelong AFLW footballer Bryde (born 2005), who was drafted as a father–daughter selection at the 2023 AFL Women's draft.
