= Kennington, Victoria =

Kennington
- Suburb
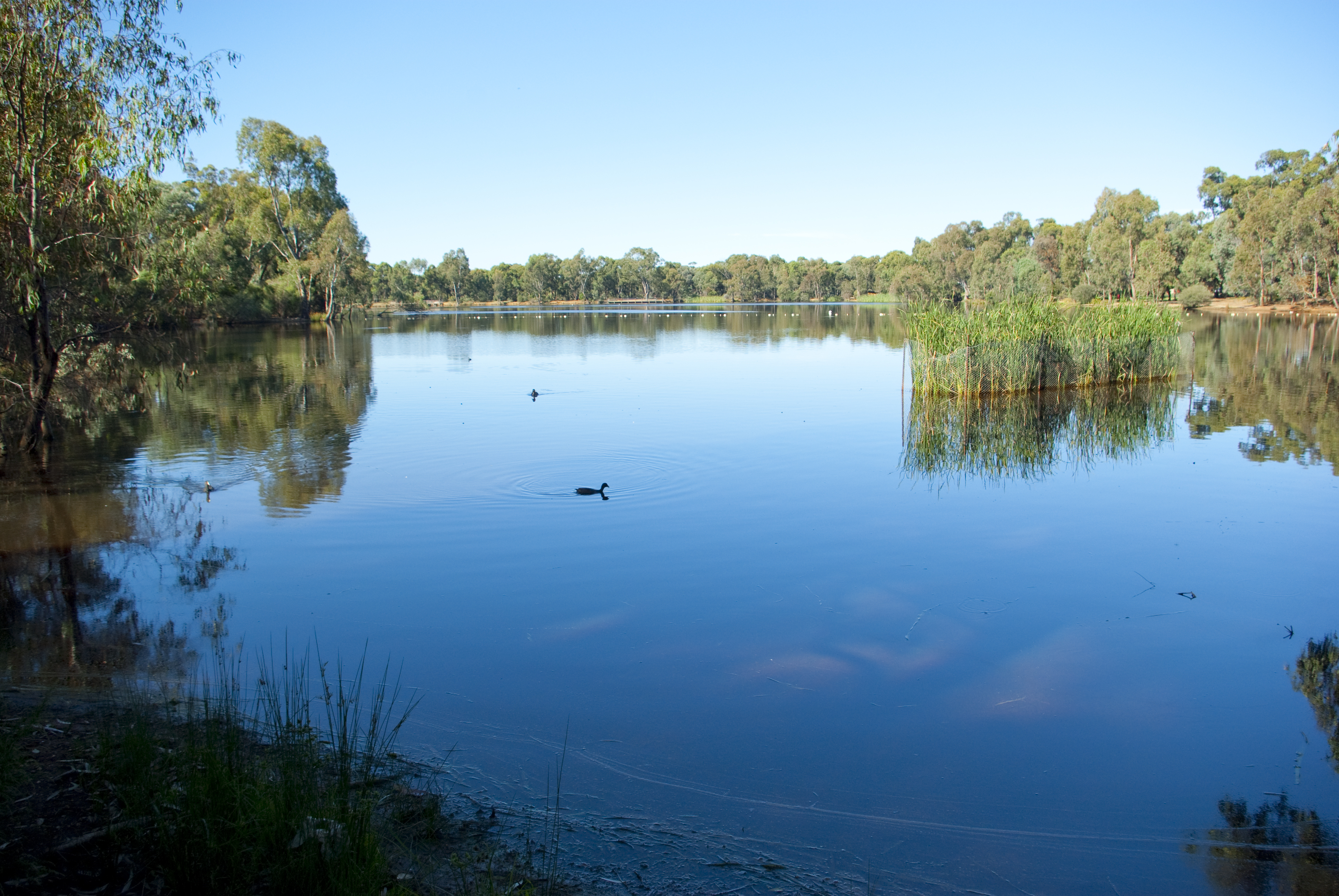
- Kennington Reservoir

- Interactive map of Kennington
- Coordinates: 36°47′S 144°18′E
- Country: Australia
- State: Victoria
- City: Bendigo
- LGA: City of Greater Bendigo
- Location: 3 km (1.9 mi) from Bendigo

Government
  - State electorate: Bendigo East
  - Federal division: Bendigo

Population
  - Total: 5,649 (2016 census)
- Postcode: 3550
Suburbs around Kennington
Bendigo	East Bendigo	Strathdale
Bendigo	Kennington	Strathdale
Quarry Hill	Flora Hill	Strathfieldsaye

Kennington is a suburb of the City of Greater Bendigo, Victoria, Australia. The suburb is located 3 kilometres (2 mi) south-east of the Bendigo city centre and at the 2016 census had a population of 5,649. The suburb is home to the Kennington Reservoir.

Kennington is known for the Convent of the Good Shepherd building which opened in 1905 and included an orphanage. The building is situated in St Aidan's Park which is next to Kennington Primary School (founded in 1901 on Marnie Street and relocating to Crook Street in 1995). After ceasing to be a convent and orphanage, the building was later used as the relocated campus of Girton College, a school operated by the Anglican Diocese of Bendigo, until 1992. The building is now used for private residences. The Kennington Post Office opened on 1 May 1913 and closed in 1972.
