= Kennington Primary School =

Government primary school in Bendigo, Victoria, Australia

Location
- 60 Crook Street; Kennington, Victoria; Australia; 36.7683°S 144.3082°E

Information
- Type: Government primary school
- Established: c. 1901
- Principal: Travis Eddy
- Grades: Prep–Year 6
- Enrolment: 600–660 (2020s)
- Campus type: Suburban
- Website: kenningtonps.vic.edu.au

Kennington Primary School is a government primary school located in the suburb of Kennington in Bendigo, Victoria, Australia. The school provides education from Prep to Year 6 and is the host campus of the Bendigo Deaf Facility, a regional specialist education program for deaf and hard of hearing students across central Victoria.

The school has received regional media coverage relating to enrolment growth, specialist disability education, student wellbeing initiatives, and funding pressures affecting Victorian public schools.

== History ==
Kennington Primary School traces its origins to the early 20th century. The school later relocated to its present Strathdale-area campus in 1995 following redevelopment works supported by the Victorian Government.

The modern campus was developed to accommodate growing enrolments and expanded specialist programs in Bendigo's south-eastern suburbs. By the late 2010s, enrolments had exceeded 600 students amid broader population growth in the Bendigo region.

In 2020, the school was included in Victorian Government maintenance and upgrade programs aimed at improving regional public school infrastructure.

== Bendigo Deaf Facility ==
Kennington Primary School hosts the Bendigo Deaf Facility, which provides specialist support for deaf and hard of hearing students in regional Victoria.

Formal deaf education in Bendigo began in 1951 at the McDonald House School for Deaf Children. Following the closure of McDonald House in 1989, deaf education services transitioned into integrated programs hosted within mainstream government schools, including Kennington Primary School. The facility forms part of a broader network involving Bendigo South East College and Bendigo Senior Secondary College, supporting students from Foundation through to Year 12.

Programs include Auslan support, hearing technology assistance, specialist teaching services, and inclusive education programs.

== Campus and facilities ==
The school's campus occupies approximately 12 hectares near bushland reserves in Bendigo's south-east.

Facilities include performing arts spaces, visual arts classrooms, sporting grounds, outdoor recreation areas, and specialist deaf education support facilities.

The school has undergone multiple refurbishments and maintenance projects since relocating to the present campus.

== Curriculum and programs ==
Kennington Primary School provides instruction based on the Victorian Curriculum and offers specialist programs in visual arts, performing arts, physical education, and Auslan.

Students participate in school camps, choirs, sport competitions, musical productions, and wellbeing initiatives.

The school has participated in regional health and wellbeing programs, including the Healthy Schools Award initiative.

== St Aidans Road Kindergarten ==
In the mid-2020s, a new kindergarten known as St Aidans Road Kindergarten was developed adjacent to Kennington Primary School as part of Victoria's Kindergarten on School Sites initiative.

The kindergarten was initially referred to as the Kennington Primary School Kindergarten during planning and development stages. The facility opened in 2026 with three kindergarten rooms capable of supporting up to 99 children.

The project was developed to support smoother transition pathways between kindergarten and primary school education in the Bendigo area.

Operations and enrolments for the kindergarten are managed by Shine Bright Early Years Management.

== Community involvement ==
Kennington Primary School has participated in a variety of regional community and charity initiatives.

During the COVID-19 pandemic in Australia, the school grounds were temporarily used as part of Bendigo vaccination initiatives organised by regional health authorities.

The school has also received regional media coverage for Harmony Day celebrations, performing arts productions, and student-led community activities.

== Funding and public attention ==
Kennington Primary School has been referenced in broader discussions concerning infrastructure pressures and public school funding in regional Victoria.

In 2025, media outlets reported allegations made by several parents concerning the treatment of disabled students at the school.

== See also ==
- Education in Victoria
- List of schools in Victoria
- List of government schools in Victoria, Australia
- Bendigo South East College
- Bendigo Senior Secondary College
