= Peter Cox (mayor) =

Peter Cox OAM

Mayor of the City of Greater Bendigo
- In office 2014–2015
- Preceded by: Barry Lyons
- Succeeded by: Rod Fyffe

Councillor of the City of Greater Bendigo for Whipstick Ward
- In office 2012–2016

Councillor of the City of Greater Bendigo for Eaglehawk Ward
- In office 2008–2012
- Preceded by: Elaine Harrington
- Succeeded by: Ward Abolished

Personal details
- Born: c.1948–1949
- Died: 31 July 2025 (aged 76) Bendigo Hospice, Bendigo
- Party: Independent
- Children: 3

Peter Cox OAM (c.1948–1949 – 31 July 2025) was an Australian politician who served as mayor of the City of Greater Bendigo from 2014 to 2015 and as a councillor from 2008 to 2016.

== Political career ==
Cox was first elected to the council in 2008, where he served in the Eaglehawk Ward, achieving 32.73% of the primary vote and 58.45% of the two candidate preferred vote, defeating incumbent councillor Elaine Harrington. In the 2012 election, Cox contested the Whipstick Ward after a new three-ward structure was introduced. He was elected with 33.71% of the vote.

Cox was elected as mayor by the council in 2014, succeeding Barry Lyons. He was officially installed as mayor on the night of 11 November, where he chaired a meeting to make a bid for upgrades to Bendigo Airport. Like Lyons, Cox's career as mayor of Bendigo was significantly impacted by the controversy surrounding the approval of the city's first mosque. The proposal, which he supported, faced strong opposition from some community members, leading to protests and public debate. This issue became a focal point of his mayoralty, and the backlash somewhat overshadowed his broader work in local government.

In March 2016, Cox was ordered to apologise to two former councillors, after a misconduct finding was made against him. The councillors, Elise Chapman and Helen Leach, claimed that Cox breached conduct guidelines several times in September 2015, during Cox's tenure as mayor. In April, Cox decided against challenging the misconduct finding, instead writing apologies to his two former colleagues.

In 2022, Cox was awarded a Medal of the Order of Australia for his services to the Bendigo community.

== Personal life ==
Cox had three children.

== Death ==
Cox died on 31 July 2025 at Bendigo Hospice, aged seventy-six, after a short battle with cancer.
