= Strathfieldsaye =

Strathfieldsaye can mean:

- Strathfieldsaye, Victoria, Australia
- an alternative spelling for the name of the Stratfield Saye estate, Hampshire, England
