= Gerry Sexton =

Australian rules footballer

Personal information
- Full name: Gerard James Sexton
- Born: 4 April 1925; Rushworth, Victoria
- Died: 24 April 2006 (aged 81)
- Original team: Northcote CYMS (CYMSFA)
- Height: 180 cm (5 ft 11 in)
- Weight: 75 kg (165 lb)

Playing career^{1}
Years	Club	Games (Goals)
1944–45	Footscray	10 (0)
- ^{1} Playing statistics correct to the end of 1945.

Gerard James Sexton (4 April 1925 – 24 April 2006) was an Australian rules footballer who played with Footscray in the Victorian Football League (VFL).

His son, Damian later played for St Kilda in the Australian Football League. The almost 45-year gap between Gerry's last game and Damian's first game is the longest ever in the league for a father and son.

Gerry Sexton had three nephews play at AFL clubs; Michael Sexton (Carlton 200 games), Ben Sexton (Footscray 39 games and Carlton 4 games) and Stephen Sexton (Carlton reserves).
