= Darryl Wakelin =

Reyired Australian rules footballer

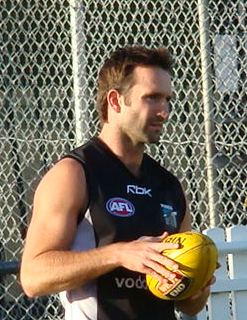

Personal information
- Born: 11 August 1974 (age 52); Whyalla, South Australia
- Original team: Port Adelaide (SANFL)
- Draft: No. 11, 1993 Pre-Season Draft, Adelaide
- Debut: 2 April 1995, St Kilda vs. West Coast Eagles, at the WACA
- Height: 192 cm (6 ft 4 in)
- Weight: 95 kg (209 lb)

Playing career
Years	Club	Games (Goals)
1993–1994	Port Adelaide (SANFL)	24 (3)
1993–1994	Adelaide	0 (0)
1995–2000	St Kilda	115 (8)
2001–2007	Port Adelaide	146 (4)
Total		261 (12)

Career highlights
- 2x Port Adelaide premiership player: 1994 (SANFL); 2004 (AFL); SANFL Jack Oatey Medal 1994; St Kilda AFL Cup winnings side 1996; St Kilda minor premiership side 1997; Port Adelaide pre-season premiership player 2001, 2002; Port Adelaide best team man 2005

Darryl Wakelin (born 11 August 1974) is a retired Australian rules footballer who played for St Kilda and Port Adelaide in the Australian Football League (AFL) as a defender.

== AFL career ==
=== Adelaide ===
Wakelin was selected by Adelaide with the 11th pick in the 1993 pre-season draft. After two seasons on their list he did not play a senior game and was delisted at the end of 1994.

=== St Kilda ===
In 1994 he played in a premiership with the Port Adelaide Magpies league team, winning the Jack Oatey Medal for best afield in the absence of his twin brother, Shane, who had already left for St Kilda. Wakelin was the first player from the "key defensive" positions of centre half-back or full-back to win the award. In 1995, he left the club to join his brother at St Kilda. He played his first game in Round 1 of the 1995 season. His career started strongly with the Saints, averaging 10 disposals in his first season.

Wakelin played in St Kilda's pre-season 1996 Ansett Australia Cup winning side – the club's first pre-season premiership win.

Wakelin played in 17 of 22 matches in the 1997 AFL premiership season home and away rounds in which St Kilda qualified in first position for the 1997 AFL finals series, winning the club’s seecond minor premiership and first McClelland Trophy.

By the end of the 2000 season, the Saints were looking for younger players and Wakelin was traded to Port Adelaide for the fourth selection in the 2000 National Draft (which was then on-traded to Carlton as part of a deal for Aaron Hamill). In total, he played 115 games for St Kilda, kicking just eight goals.

=== Port Adelaide ===
In 2001 he joined the Port Adelaide without his twin brother, Shane, who moved to Collingwood. In 2004 he won a premiership with Port Adelaide after his brother had played in the two losing previous grand finals. During 2005 the Wakelin brothers became the most capped pair of twin brothers, overtaking Steven Febey and Matthew Febey. In Round 12 of 2006, he picked up a career high 22 disposals against West Coast. In round 5, 2007, he played his 250th game. On 29 August 2007 he announced his retirement from AFL at the season end, which in fact concluded for him as part of the 2007 Port Adelaide grand final team.

== Personal life ==
Wakelin's identical twin, Shane Wakelin, played alongside him at St Kilda. Wakelin was born on 11 August 1974. Shane was born on 12 August as he was born a number of minutes after midnight and Darryl was born a number of minutes before midnight. He was born in Whyalla, South Australia, but moved to Kimba, South Australia, at just six months old. His father was a wheat sheep farmer. He was 13 when he moved to Port Lincoln, South Australia. At 16 he was identified by Port Adelaide along with his twin brother and they made the move down to Adelaide.

Throughout his AFL career, Wakelin was known as one of the best fullbacks in the competition along with his brother Shane.

== Playing statistics ==
Legend
G	Goals	K	Kicks	D	Disposals	T	Tackles
B	Behinds	H	Handballs	M	Marks
#	Played in that season's premiership team

Season	Team	No.	Games	Totals							Averages (per game)						
Season	Team	No.	Games	G	B	K	H	D	M	T	G	B	K	H	D	M	T
1995	St Kilda	15	21	0	1	146	66	212	61	30	0.0	0.0	7.0	3.1	10.1	2.9	1.4
1996	St Kilda	15	15	2	0	58	33	91	31	17	0.1	0.0	3.9	2.2	6.1	2.1	1.1
1997	St Kilda	15	20	4	2	71	56	127	38	24	0.2	0.1	3.6	2.8	6.4	1.9	1.2
1998	St Kilda	15	22	1	2	121	80	201	73	28	0.0	0.1	5.5	3.6	9.1	3.3	1.3
1999	St Kilda	15	19	1	2	116	60	176	83	13	0.1	0.1	6.1	3.2	9.3	4.4	0.7
2000	St Kilda	15	18	0	3	103	63	166	78	16	0.0	0.2	5.7	3.5	9.2	4.3	0.9
2001	Port Adelaide	2	23	1	1	94	75	169	64	32	0.0	0.0	4.1	3.3	7.3	2.8	1.4
2002	Port Adelaide	2	21	2	0	96	86	182	89	31	0.1	0.0	4.6	4.1	8.7	4.2	1.5
2003	Port Adelaide	2	20	0	1	129	57	186	101	25	0.0	0.1	6.5	2.9	9.3	5.1	1.3
2004^{#}	Port Adelaide	2	23	1	0	122	92	214	104	27	0.0	0.0	5.3	4.0	9.3	4.5	1.2
2005	Port Adelaide	2	24	0	0	149	106	255	134	27	0.0	0.0	6.2	4.4	10.6	5.6	1.1
2006	Port Adelaide	2	20	0	1	164	90	254	130	11	0.0	0.1	8.2	4.5	12.7	6.5	0.6
2007	Port Adelaide	2	15	0	0	112	59	171	80	21	0.0	0.0	7.5	3.9	11.4	5.3	1.4
Career			261	12	13	1481	923	2404	1066	302	0.0	0.0	5.7	3.5	9.2	4.1	1.2

== Trivia ==
- Wakelin has a pharmacy degree from Monash University and runs a pharmacy in Alberton South Australia.

== See also ==
- 1994 SANFL Grand Final
