= David Jones (mayor) =

Australian politician and businessman

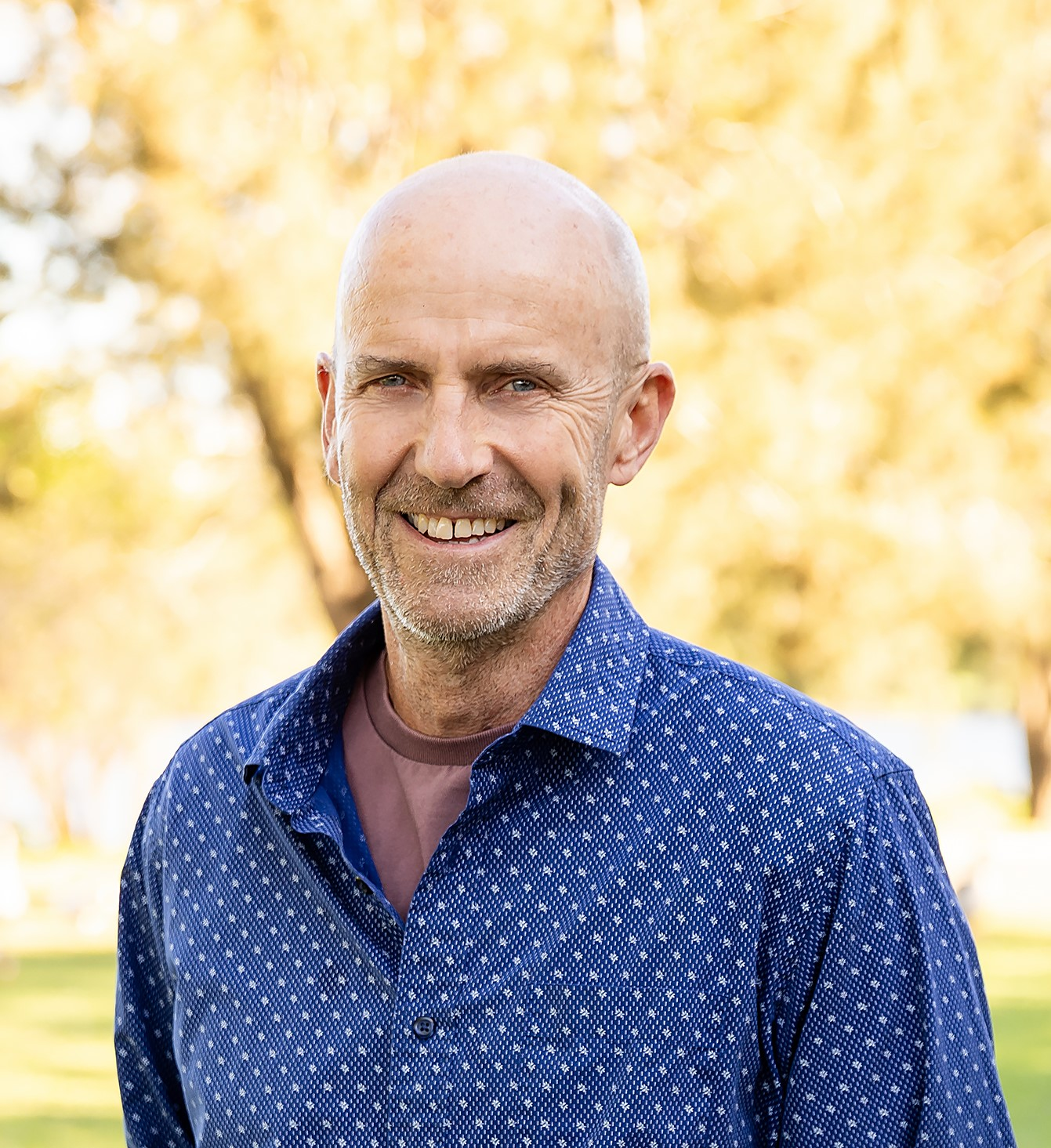

Councillor of the Nambucca Valley Council
- Incumbent
- Assumed office 2016

Mayor of the City of Greater Bendigo
- In office 2007–2008
- Preceded by: Julie Rivendell
- Succeeded by: Kevin Gibbins
- In office 2005–2006
- Preceded by: Rod Fyffe
- Succeeded by: Julie Rivendell

Councillor of the City of Greater Bendigo for Kangaroo Flat Ward
- In office 2004–2008
- Preceded by: Ward Established
- Succeeded by: Barry Lyons

Personal details
- Born: c. 1965 Wales, United Kingdom
- Party: Australian Greens

David Jones is an Australian politician and teacher who has served as a councillor of the Nambucca Valley Council since 2016, and was mayor of the City of Greater Bendigo twice. He is a member of the Australian Greens.

== Political career ==
=== Greater Bendigo ===
Jones was elected to the City of Greater Bendigo in the 2004 election in Kangaroo Flat Ward coming second place in the primary vote with 29.85% of the vote, but winning the seat after preferences with 53.43% of the two-candidate-preferred vote.

Jones was first elected mayor by the council in 2005, winning out against incumbent mayor Rod Fyffe. He was regional Victoria's first Greens mayor. His term ended in 2006, where Julie Rivendell became mayor, also a member of the Greens.

In 2007, Jones was elected as mayor again to replace Julie Rivendell, who did not seek another term due to health reasons. The Bendigo Advertiser described Jones's reappointment as a "surprise decision", after the council voted following nearly two hours of closed deliberations to return him to the mayoralty. Jones praised Rivendell’s leadership and said his priorities included community engagement, water security, and responding to climate change.

Jones contested the 2008 election but lost his seat to future mayor Barry Lyons. He came second on primary votes with 32.68% of the vote and won 48.24% of the two-candidate two-candidate preferred vote, 238 votes behind Lyons.

In the 2010 Victorian state election, Jones was the lead candidate on the Greens ticket in the Northern Victoria Region. During his campaign, he opposed the construction of a casino in Mildura. Joes also criticised Labor’s preference deal with the Country Alliance, describing the move as hostile to the Greens and saying he was "gobsmacked" by the arrangement. Jones argued that debate over preferences distracted from policy discussion and said the Greens would consider whether to issue an open ticket rather than directing preferences to Labor. Jones won 7.74% of the vote but did not win a seat.

In 2011, Jones publicly opposed the City of Greater Bendigo’s 2011 draft budget, which planned to accumulate $35 million in new debt over four years. Jones condemned the strategy as financially irresponsible, arguing that excessive borrowing would constrain future councils.

Jones intended to contest the 2012 election on a platform of "keeping Bendigo livable". He withdrew before the election and was not a candidate, instead choosing to support other Greens candidates.

=== Nambucca Valley ===
Jones was elected to the Nambucca Valley Council in the 2016 New South Wales local elections.

He was re-elected to the council in the 2021 election with 3.4% of the vote.

During the 2022 Australian federal election, speaking to The Guardian, Jones expressed the view that many residents of the electorate of Cowper were frustrated with both major parties during the federal election and criticised United Australia Party advertising in the region as ineffective and misleading.

In the 2024 local election, Jones was an endorsed Green candidate, rather than running as an unendorsed independent Green. Jones cited blueberry farming as a key issue. Jones had previously responded to public concerns about blueberry farming in the Nambucca Valley during his term. He was re-elected with 11.1% of the primary vote.

As a councillor, Jones opposed the proposed sale of the Ivey Pacey House by Nambucca Seniors in 2024. He argued that it conflicted with the purpose of the facility and the legacy of its namesake. He also noted that substantial public grant funding had been invested in upgrading the facility. During the dispute, Jones submitted an application for membership of the club, which the secretary said was declined on the grounds that his approach was "deceptive" and motivated by opposition to the sale rather than participation in the organisation.

During a council meeting in May 2025, Jones supported the proposed Scotts Head–Macksville cycleway in principle, but cautioned councillors to weigh its cost-effectiveness against other community priorities before committing funding.

In January 2026, Jones criticised a draft amendment to the Nambucca Valley Local Environmental Plan regulating intensive blueberry farming, describing it as a "stitch-up" that failed to deliver meaningful regulation. He argued the proposal left too much responsibility to industry self-regulation and said decision-making had been shifted away from council and the public toward state agencies and lobby groups.
