= Matilda Sergeant =

Australian rules footballer

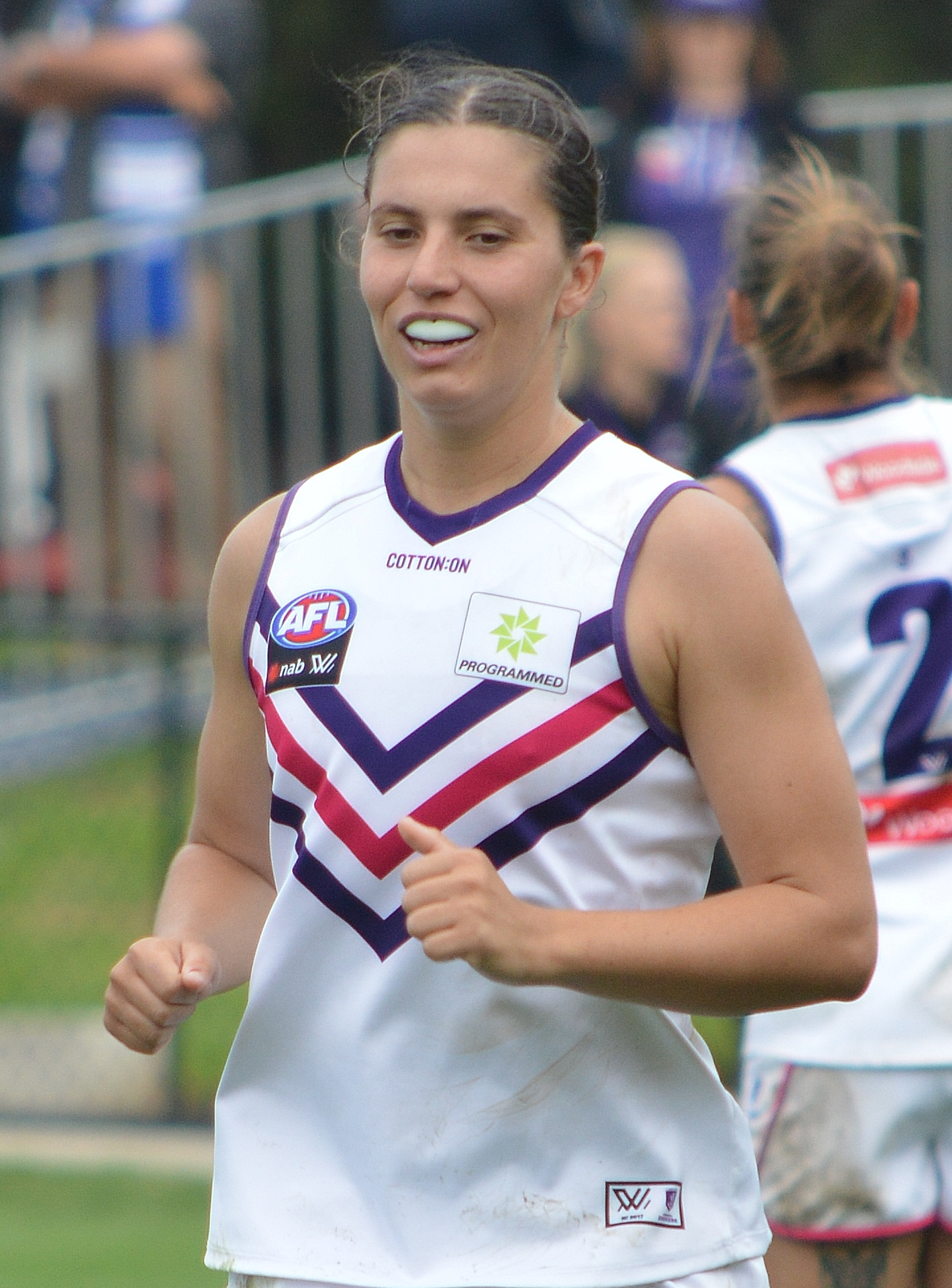
- Sergeant with Fremantle in March 2021

Personal information
- Born: 13 March 1999 (age 27)
- Original team: Claremont (WAWFL)
- Draft: No. 64, 2018 AFL Women's draft No. 42, 2023 AFL Women's draft
- Debut: Round 5, 2019, Fremantle vs. Western Bulldogs, at Fremantle Oval
- Height: 169 cm (5 ft 7 in)
- Position: Midfielder

Club information
- Current club: West Coast

Playing career^{1}
Years	Club	Games (Goals)
2019–2022 (S7)	Fremantle	19 (0)
2024–	West Coast	0 (0)
Total		19 (0)
- ^{1} Playing statistics correct to the end of the 2023 season.

Matilda Sergeant (born 13 March 1999) is an Australian rules footballer who plays for West Coast in the AFL Women's (AFLW). She previously played for Fremantle.

Sergeant was drafted by Fremantle with their second last selection and 64th overall in the 2018 AFL Women's draft. She made her debut in Fremantle's win against Western Bulldogs at Fremantle Oval in Round 5 of the 2019 season. In March 2023, Sergeant was delisted by Fremantle.

She returned to the AFLW for the 2024 season when West Coast drafted her with the 42nd pick in the 2023 draft.
