= Construction, Forestry, Mining and Energy Union v BHP Coal Pty Ltd =

Judgement of the High Court of Australia

CFMEU v BHP Coal Pty Ltd
- Court: High Court of Australia
- Decided: 16 Oct 2014
- Citations: [2014] HCA 41; 88 ALJR 980; 253 CLR 243

Court membership
- Judges sitting: French CJ, Hayne, Crennan, Kiefel, Gageler JJ

Case opinions
- (3:2) Appeal dismissed majority The true motivations of Mr Brick in sacking Doevendans were not for reason of his participation in protected activities French CJ & Kiefel J It had been proven at trial that the waiving of signs and participation in protest were not operative reasons for the dismissal Gageler J dissenting No distinction can be drawn between the activity of protest and the lawful, albeit offensive manner in which the employee protested Hayne J The trial judge was entitled to find on the material before him, that adverse action had been taken against Doevendans for his participation in a protected industrial activity Crennan J

CFMEU v BHP Coal Pty Ltd [2014] HCA 41 is an Australian labour law case on the Fair Work Act's section 346 protections against adverse action for participation in industrial activities. It was decided by the High Court of Australia. It was an appeal brought by the Construction, Forestry and Maritime Employees Union against BHP Coal.

The case centered on BHP's decision to terminate the employment of an employee, who in the course of a lawful protest had held up a sign reading 'No principles SCABS No guts'.

== Facts ==
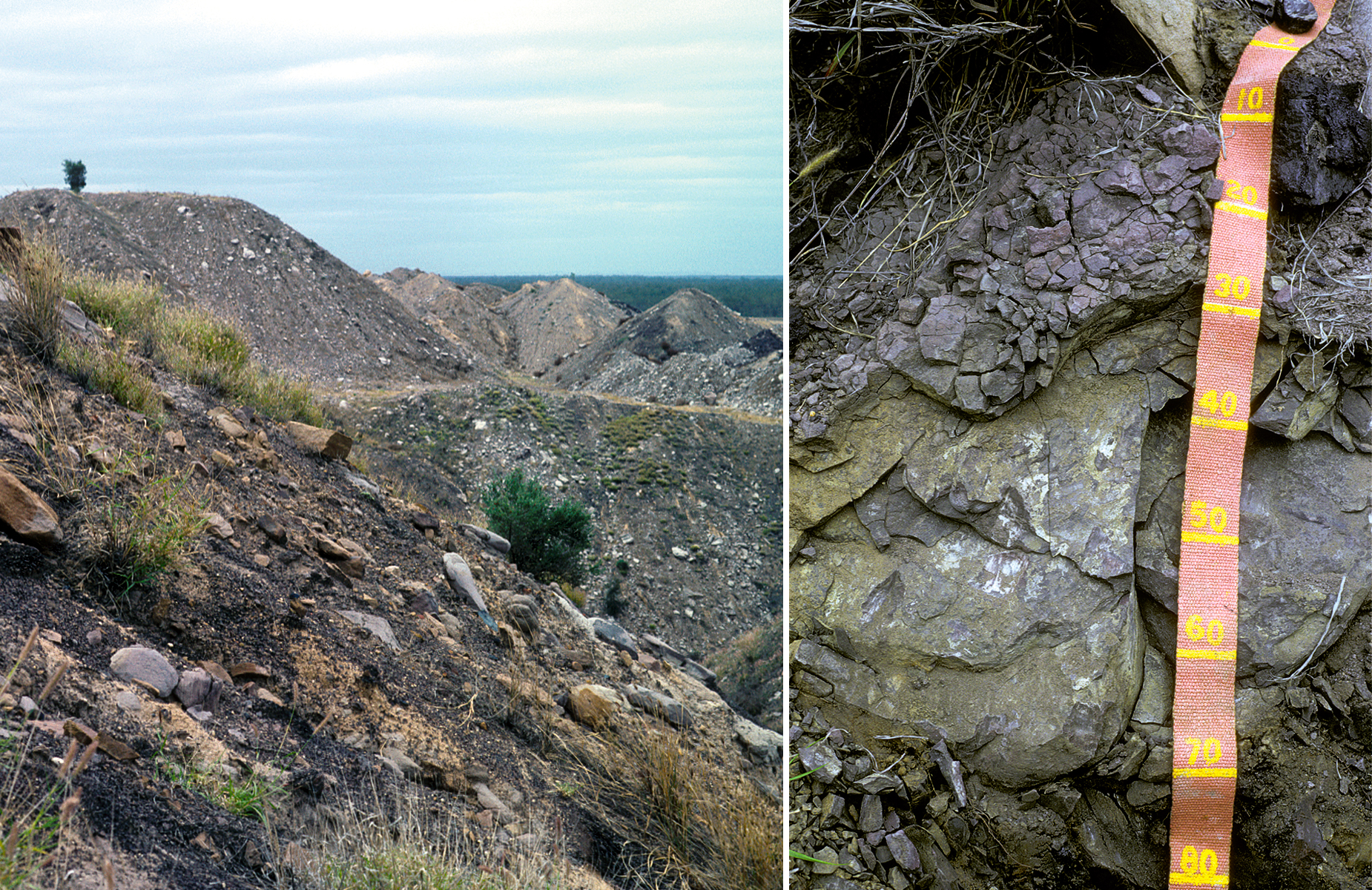
CSIRO image of the Saraji colliery

In May 2012 the respondent BHP Coal dismissed one of its employees, Mr Henk Doevendans. Mr Doevendands had been employed at the Saraji coal mine for 24 years, and was a member of the CFMEU.

The general manager of the mine, Mr Geoff Brick decided that Doevendans should be dismissed. He took this action because during protests that the CFMEU held in association with a seven-day work stoppage, Doevendans had several times held up a sign reading 'No principles SCABS No guts'. In Mr Brick's view, the use of the word 'scab' was 'unacceptable in the workplace'. Use of the word scab was contrary to BHP's workplace conduct policy; which required courtesy and respect to other employees. Mr Brick regarded the conduct as arrogant and 'antagonistic to the culture (he) was endeavoring to develop at the mine'.

Under the Fair Work Act dismissal is a form of 'adverse action'. Section 346 of the act prohibits persons taking adverse action against another person because that person has engaged in 'industrial activity' within the meaning of s347. The CFMEU sued under the Act, asserting that BHP Coal had acted in breach.

At trial Jessup J held that BHP had dismissed Doevendans in breach of the act. BHP Coal then appealed to the Full Federal Court, where Dowsett J and Flick J upheld the appeal by majority; Kenny J dissenting. They concluded that BHP had not dismissed Doevendans because he had engaged in industrial activity as defined in the act.

The CFMEU then sought review in the High Court.

== Judgement ==
The High Court narrowly decided the appeal in favour of BHP.

=== Majority ===
==== French CJ & Kiefel J ====
French & Kiefel made their decision in reliance on findings made by the trial judge. Jessup J had found that Mr Brick's reason for making a decision to terminate, didn't include Mr Doevendans' participation in industrial activity, or him having represented the views of the CFMEU. Jessup J had made an explicit finding that Brick was not motivated by those considerations.

While there existed a 'connection' between the decision to terminate and Doevendans' holding up of the sign, in the words of the court: 'That connection may necessitate some consideration as to the true motivations of Mr Brick, but it cannot itself provide the reason why Mr Brick took the action he did. That enquiry was concluded by his Honour's earlier findings'.

==== Gageler J ====
His honour formulated the core issue the case as being:

'In a case where the totality of the operative and immediate reasons for one person having taken adverse action against another person are proved, the question presented by s 346(b) is whether any one or more of those reasons answers the description of the other person having engaged in any one or more of the industrial activities listed in s 347(a) or (b)'

Gageler found that the totality of the reasons for BHP having taken adverse action were 'proved by the evidence of Mr Brick about his own process of reasoning'. It had been proven at trial that the waiving of signs and participation in protest, were not operative reasons. Therefore, he affirmed the Full Federal Court's finding that Doevendans' dismissal was not in contravention of s346(b).

=== Dissent ===
==== Hayne J ====
Hayne J found for the CFMEU, on the ground that no distinction could be drawn between the activity of protest and the manner in which the employee protested; and so therefore Doevendans had been dismissed for a prohibited reason.

He wrote that 'Mr Doevendans' use of the word (scab) ... cannot be divorced from the circumstances in which it was used.' Mr Brick's reasons for dismissing Doevendans 'hinged around the language in which Mr Doevendans chose to express that latter form of protest'. Hayne went on to write:

'Both the activity and the manner in which Mr Doevendans took part in it were lawful. So long as the protest was conducted lawfully, it was not to the point to ask (as Mr Brick did) whether what was said or done in the protest would offend others or, in particular, would offend some employees. And when Mr Brick concluded that Mr Doevendans should be dismissed because he had deliberately and repeatedly protested in an offensive manner, Mr Brick acted for a prohibited reason. He dismissed Mr Doevendans because he had participated in a lawful activity organised by the CFMEU'

==== Crennan J ====
Crennan briefly surveyed prior authorities dealing with legislative predecessors to ss346 and 361 of the act. Her Honour found that there was authority for the protective provisions requiring an inquiry that 'asked more than why a decision-maker acted as he or she did'. She found that the primary judge had found Mr Brick to be a reliable witness, and that Mr Doevendans had not been dismissed 'for reasons other than those given by (Mr Brick)'. Nevertheless, the primary judge did not state or imply that he had accepted Mr Brick's assertion that Doevendans' engagement in industrial activity played no part in his decision-making process.

Her honour found that the circumstances and conduct for which Doevendans was dismissed, was inconsistent with, and rendered unreliable by, Mr Brick's assertion that Doevendans' engagement with industrial action had nothing to do with the decision. Crennan found that on the material before the trial, Jessup J was entitled to reject BHP's 'contention that holding and waving the scabs sign as part of lawful industrial activities protected under s 347(b)(iii) and (v) could be abstracted from the Act's protection; because the sign was offensive, albeit lawful'.

Therefore, the primary judge was 'entitled to conclude that Mr Brick terminated Doevendans' employment for the reasons given, and that those reasons supported Doevendans' inferential case against BHP'. Crennan asserted that the case Board of Bendigo v Barclay 'doesn't hinder the drawing of available inferences which may controvert an honest decision-maker's assertion that ... (adverse action was not taken for a prohibited reason)'.

Additionally, in regards to the sign Crennan J found that while 'the scabs sign used "conspicuously offensive language", the only qualification of the protection given by s347(b)(iii) is that the activity ... be lawful—there is no additional qualification that it be anodyne'.

== Significance ==
As of 2020, CFMEU v BHP Coal is the latest High Court case to deal with adverse action in the context of protected industrial activities. It is an important case for Australian unions and employers.

The case has been described by a human resources industry journal as standing for the proposition that; 'If the behaviour of an employee-unionist offends or is against the company's values then the employer may take disciplinary action—even if the behaviour is representative of a union'. Clayton Utz for the employers, said of the decision that 'One clear result is that conduct of an employee-unionist that can be characterised as the representation or advancing of views or interests of a union is not absolutely protected. (If it) is inimical to values that an employer requires of its employees, then an employer may well be able to take disciplinary action'.

Andrew Vickers, General Secretary of the CFMEU's Mining and Energy division at the time said the decision was a 'blow to workers' rights, freedom of expression and participation in lawful industrial activity'. He was quoted at the time as saying:

'The word 'scab' is of common and historical use in Australian industrial disputes—it's not a personal insult but a reflection of collective values. ... We maintain our belief (Doevendans) was targeted for sacking not because he was holding a sign but because he was a union delegate ... (BHP had used the) excuse of a code of conduct to put a worker out of a job.'

== See also ==
- Australian labour law
- Board of Bendigo Regional Institute of Technical and Further Education v Barclay
