= Damian Sexton =

Australian rules footballer

Personal information
- Full name: Damian Sexton
- Born: 3 December 1968 (age 57)
- Original teams: Finley, Yarrawonga, (OMFL)
- Draft: No. 23, 1990 Mid-year Draft

Playing career^{1}
Years	Club	Games (Goals)
1990	St Kilda	4 (1)
- ^{1} Playing statistics correct to the end of 1990.

Career highlights
- 1988 Murray FL Premiership: Finley; 1989 O&MFL Premiership: Yarrawonga; 2000 Picola & DFNL Premiership: Blighty; 1998, 1999, 2001 - Picola & DFNL Best & Fairest: Pearce Medal

Damian Sexton (born 3 December 1968) is a former Australian rules footballer who played for St Kilda in the Australian Football League (AFL) in 1990. He was recruited from the Yarrawonga Football Club in the Ovens & Murray Football League (OMFL) with the 23rd selection in the 1990 Mid-year Draft.

He is the cousin of Michael and Ben Sexton, who both also played in the AFL. His father, Gerry played for Footscray in the Victorian Football League. The almost 45-year gap between Gerry's last game and Damian's first game is the longest ever in the league for a father and son.

After playing in the AFL, Sexton returned to country football where he played for Yarrawonga and Finley Football Clubs, and then moved into coaching. He captained and then coached the Murray Football League side in interleague competition and was the Victorian Country Under 18 coach in 2009. Sexton also coached the Yarrawonga Football Club in the Ovens & Murray Football League.

Sexton was non playing coach of the Ovens & Murray Football League senior football interleague side from 2020 to 2024.

Damian Sexton had three cousins play at AFL clubs, Michael Sexton (Carlton 200 games), Ben Sexton (Footscray 39 games & Carlton 4 games) and Stephen Sexton (Carlton reserves).
