= Robert Neill (Australian footballer) =

Australian rules footballer

Personal information
- Full name: Robert Neill
- Born: 5 January 1974 (age 52)
- Original team: Southern Districts
- Height: 184 cm (6 ft 0 in)
- Weight: 90 kg (198 lb)
- Position: Defender/ruck-rover

Playing career^{1}
Years	Club	Games (Goals)
1992 – 1994	Sydney	21 (9)
1996 – 1997	St Kilda	23 (7)
Total		44 (16)
- ^{1} Playing statistics correct to the end of 1997.

Robert Neill (born 5 January 1974) is a former Australian rules footballer who played with Sydney and St Kilda in the Australian Football League (AFL) during the 1990s.

Originally from the ACT, Neill appeared sporadically for Sydney before cementing his spot in the team for the 1994 season when he managed 15 games. He however failed to appear in a single game for the seniors the following year and crossed to St Kilda.

Neill played in St Kilda's 1996 AFL Ansett Australia Cup winning side - the club's first AFL Cup win.

He was a regular in the 1996 season and despite only playing the opening two games of 1997, he was selected on the bench for the 1997 AFL Grand Final. After being delisted he went to Norwood where he was used as a forward and topped their goal-kicking five times.

Neill is now the SANFL Women's High Performance Manager after spending over a decade working with Norwood's juniors in the SANFL.
