= Jennifer Alden =

Australian politician (born 1957)

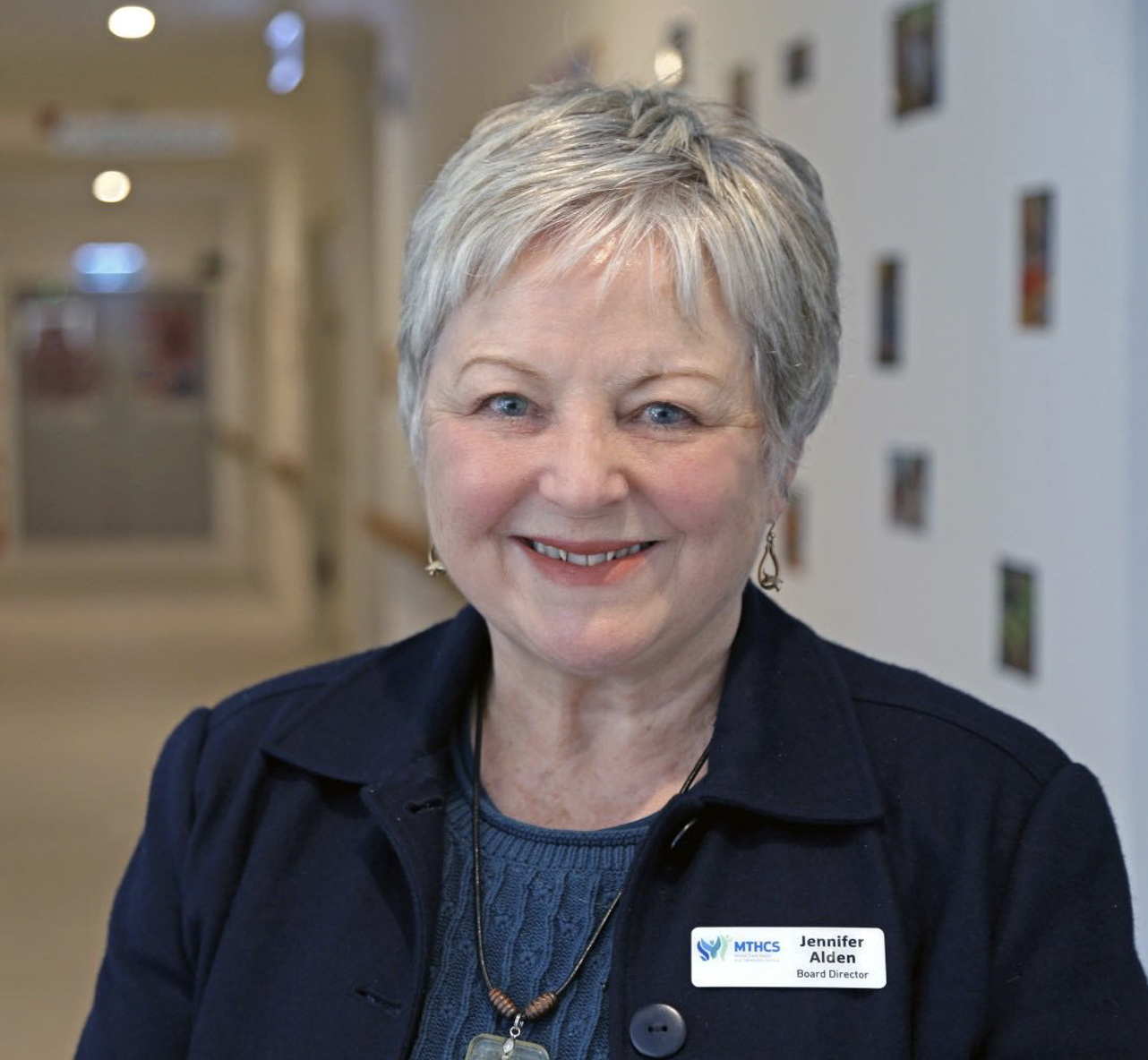
- Alden in 2025

Mayor of the City of Greater Bendigo
- In office 2020–2021
- Deputy: Andrea Metcalf
- Preceded by: Margaret O'Rourke
- Succeeded by: Andrea Metcalf

Deputy Mayor of the City of Greater Bendigo
- In office 2017–2018
- Preceded by: Rod Fyffe
- Succeeded by: Matt Emond
- In office 2022–2023
- Preceded by: Matthew Evans
- Succeeded by: Matthew Evans

Councillor of the City of Greater Bendigo for Lockwood Ward
- In office 2016–2024

Jennifer Alden (born 1957) is an Australian former politician who served as Mayor of the City of Greater Bendigo from 2020 to 2021 and as a councillor from 2016 to 2024. She served as Deputy Mayor twice.

== Early life and career ==
Alden was born in Mildura in 1957 and raised in Middle Park. She attended Vaucluse Convent FCJ in Richmond. In 1974, she enrolled at Monash University, where she completed a Bachelor of Science degree in microbiology. In 1977, she completed an Honours degree in Science, studying the use of the enzyme-linked immunosorbent assay (ELISA) for detection of antibodies to influenza A. Alden began a PhD on the development of a vaccine for syphilis in 1978 but discontinued the program. She subsequently worked as a research scientist at Prince Henry's Hospital microbiology department in conjunction with Monash University's Department of Surgery, undertaking research for Pfizer on the use of tinidazole in colonic surgery patients.

Alden later completed a Diploma of Naturopathy at the Southern School of Natural Therapies, focusing on nutrition, herbal medicine, and women's health, and practiced as a naturopathic health consultant until 2003. In 1998, she completed a Masters degree in Women's Health at the Key Centre for Women's Health at the University of Melbourne. Alden's first book, Liberated Eating: The Serotonin Programme for Depressed Dieters, was published in 2001 by Lothian Books.In 2003 she became CEO of Women’s Health Loddon Mallee and also served as convenor of the Women’s Health Association of Victoria in 2006. In 2012, she graduated with a Doctor of Public Health from Flinders University; her dissertation examined Australian food and nutrition policy development opportunities.

In 2007, Alden joined VicHealth as a Senior Policy Advisor in the Research Strategy and Policy Unit, including a brief period as Acting Director. She managed a project on the health and economic benefits of reducing disease risk factors. In 2009, she became CEO of Cultivating Community, an urban agriculture non-profit organisation based in Victoria.

From 2012 to 2015, she was an Honorary Research Fellow at the Melbourne Sustainable Societies Institute at the University of Melbourne.

In 2018 she undertook the Australian Institute of Company Directors course completion with award of GAICD. She is a Board Director at Mallee Track Health & Community Services, a member of the Municipal Association of Victoria’s Health and Wellbeing Advisory Panel and Deputy Chair of the Bendigo Maubisse Friendship Committee.

== Political career ==
In 1995, Alden co-founded the Bendigo branch of the Australian Greens. In the 2006 Victorian state election, Alden ran as the Victorian Greens lead candidate for the Northern Victoria Region, although she failed to be elected. In the 2014 Victorian state election, Alden unsuccessfully contested the division of Bendigo East. In the 2016 Australian federal election, she was listed as the eighth candidate on the Greens' Senate ticket for Victoria. She resigned from the Australian Greens in 2018.

Alden was first elected to the City of Greater Bendigo Council in the 2016 election, where she received 8.86% of the primary vote in the Lockwood Ward. In 2017, she was elected as Deputy Mayor of Bendigo, serving under mayor Margaret O'Rourke until 2018. In 2018 she was awarded the Municipal Association of Victoria’s McArthur travelling fellowship for international local government research.

Alden was re-elected in the 2020 election with 18.23% and was subsequently elected by the council to the position of mayor, with Andrea Metcalf serving as Deputy Mayor. During her one-year term as Mayor, she worked to address the challenges posed by the COVID-19 pandemic. In 2022, she was elected as Deputy Mayor for a second time, serving until 2023. Alden did not contest the 2024 election, citing in part the changes to the ward system under the Local Government Act 2020.

Alden holds a Doctorate of Public Health, Masters in Women's Health and is an Adjunct Senior Research Fellow at La Trobe University.

== Personal life ==
Alden married Peter Morison in 1980. The couple moved to Bendigo in 1982. Alden and her husband own a property in Pine Grove that is under a Trust for Nature conservation covenant.
