= David Sierakowski =

Australian rules footballer, born 1974

Personal information
- Born: 29 December 1974 (age 51)
- Original team: Subiaco (WAFL)
- Debut: Round 14, 25 June 1994, St Kilda vs. Adelaide, at Waverley Park
- Height: 193 cm (6 ft 4 in)
- Weight: 101 kg (223 lb)

Playing career^{1}
Years	Club	Games (Goals)
1994–2000	St Kilda	93 (27)
2001–2003	West Coast	10 (3)
Total		103 (30)
- ^{1} Playing statistics correct to the end of 2003.

Career highlights
- St Kilda Pre-season premiership side 1996; St Kilda Grand Final side 1997

David Sierakowski (born 29 December 1974) is a former Australian rules footballer in the Australian Football League.

He was recruited to the Saints in the 1992 AFL draft under the father–son rule. He spent the whole of 1993 season in the reserves developing his game and settling into Melbourne life with relatives. He became a solid key position player, particularly in defence.

During his 1993 debut year with just 3 games, he spent 3 months in Perth under orders of coach Stan Alves to improve his fitness. Sierakowski returned to St Kilda and played most of the 1994 season in major roles down back in the senior side. This season saw David win the club's Best First Year and Most Improved Player Awards.

Sierakowski played in St Kilda’s 1996 AFL Ansett Australia Cup winning side.

Throughout the year, Sierakowski found himself playing both forward and defensive roles, taking a liking to the wide open spaces of Waverley Park and building a reputation along the way.

A major career highlight included playing in the 1997 Grand Final side.

By 1998, he had become a versatile player and was spending more time in ruckman roles. He capped off a stellar year earning State of Origin selection for WA and played against South Australia in Adelaide. The off-season meant major knee surgery after suffering from recurring patella tendonitis.

Mid-way through 1999 came the first of a series of major knee injuries, when Sierakowski snapped his right patella tendon in a game against Fremantle. He was sidelined for nearly 12 months and returned to play 14 games in 2000 under new coach Tim Watson and finished 6th in the club's best and fairest award. The off-season saw the robust utility traded to the West Coast Eagles in a trade that enabled Fraser Gehrig to return to Melbourne. WCE drafted Daniel Kerr.

Sierakowski, originally from Perth, moved back to his home state in 2001. He made his debut for the club in Round 1 of that year against Geelong at Kardinia Park but was struck in the back of the head by an errant swinging forearm. Knocked unconscious mid-air from the severity of the blow, and landing awkwardly, he suffered a second knee injury, requiring a reconstruction that forced him out of the game until 2002. He returned but struggled to find form, with a series of hamstring injuries and continuing knee problems. Unable to capture his true form, he retired at the end of 2003.

Sierakowski has stayed involved in football at WAFL level as an assistant coach with Subiaco Football Club, initially under Peter German where the club won 2 Premierships in 3 years. Under Scott Watters, he had been an important part of the match committee.

He now owns and manages Scout Entertainment, which is in liquidation.
