= Bendigo Base Hospital =

Public Hospital in Victoria, Australia

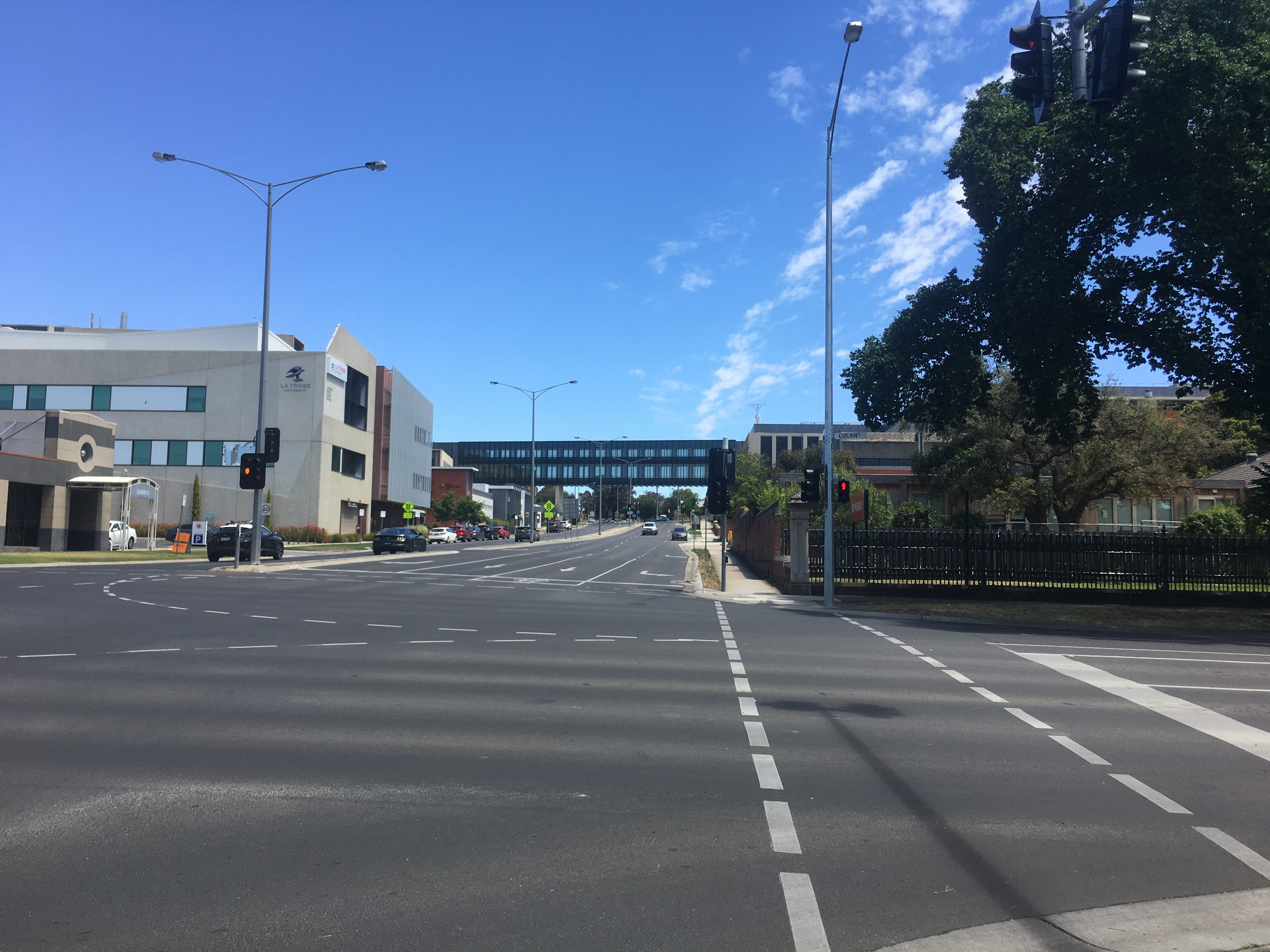
- Bendigo hospital from the corner of Lucan Street and Arnold Street

Geography
- Location: Bendigo, Victoria, Australia
- Coordinates: 36.7327°S 144.2683°E

Organisation
- Type: General, Teaching
- Affiliated university: Monash University, La Trobe University
- Network: Bendigo Health

Services
- Beds: 778

Helipads
- Helipad: Yes (ICAO: YXBE)

History
- Opened: 1853

Links
- Website: bendigohealth.org.au
- Lists: Hospitals in Australia

Bendigo Base Hospital is the major hospital of Bendigo, Victoria, Australia. It is operated by Bendigo Health Care Group (commonly known as Bendigo Health). The hospital is the largest regional hospital in Victoria and one of the largest public hospitals in Australia with a total of 778 beds. As of 2019, the hospital employs around 4,000 staff and provides a wide range of services to a catchment area covering one-fourth of the size of Victoria state.

== History ==
In 1853, it was established as the Bendigo Gold District General Hospital.

== Campuses ==
The hospital consists of three major campuses in Bendigo, with many services extended to regional Victoria such as Mildura, Echuca, Swan Hill, Kyneton and Castlemaine. The main campus encompasses all acute medical beds, an intensive care unit, an emergency department, an acute psychiatric ward (the Alexander Bayne Centre) and an outpatients unit. The Anne Caudle Centre includes rehabilitation, geriatric rehabilitation and aged care beds. The Stella Anderson Nursing Home is a high level nursing home and the Primary Care Clinic is one of the only two bulk billing general practices in Bendigo.

== Services and specialties provided ==
=== Medical specialities ===
- General medicine
- Endocrinology
- Gastroenterology
- Geriatric medicine
- Respiratory medicine
- Rehabilitation medicine
- Nephrology
- Cardiology
- Coronary care unit
- Renal dialysis unit
- Oncology
- Palliative care

=== Surgical specialities ===
- General surgery
- Orthopedic surgery
- Vascular surgery
- Thoracic surgery
- Plastic surgery
- Maxillofacial surgery
- Urology
- Ophthalmology
- Anaesthetics

=== Women and children ===
- Women's ward and birthing suite
- Children's ward
- Special care nursery
- Women's health clinics
- Obstetrics and gynaecology
- Paediatrics

=== Mental health ===
- Psychiatry
- Geriatric psychiatry
- CATT - Crisis Assessment and Treatment Team
- Community mental health

=== Miscellaneous ===
- Emergency department
- Intensive care unit
- Primary care centre
- Pharmacy
- Radiology
- Pathology
- Research
- Dental health
- Allied health

== See also ==
- List of hospitals in Australia
