= Jennifer Harris (rugby union) =

- Born: 7 July 1977 (age 49) Bendigo, VIC
- School: Catholic College, Bendigo

Rugby union career
- Position: Prop
International career
Years	Team	Apps	(Points)
2001–2002	Australia	6	(0)

Jennifer Katherine Fox Harris (née Egan; born 7 July 1977) is a former Australian rugby union player. She made her test debut for Australia in 2001 against England in Sydney. She played six test matches for the Wallaroos from 2001 to 2002.

Harris competed for the Wallaroos at the 2002 Rugby World Cup in Spain. She was named on the bench for Australia's squad that faced the Black Ferns in their final pool game.
