= Catherine McAuley College =

- Bendigo, Victoria; Australia

Information
- Former names: Catholic College Bendigo; Marist Brothers' College; St. Vincent's College; St Mary's College
- Type: Secondary college
- Motto: "Living Mercy"
- Denomination: Roman Catholic (Sisters of Mercy)
- Established: 1876
- Principal: Brian Turner
- Staff: 240
- Enrollment: 1600
- Campuses: Coolock (junior) and St. Mary's (senior)
- Houses: Backhaus; Champagnat; Jaara; MacKillop; McAuley; Vincent
- Website: www.cmc.vic.edu.au

Catherine McAuley College, formerly Catholic College Bendigo until 2018, is an Australian coeducational Catholic secondary school in Bendigo, Victoria.

The school has two campuses, Coolock and St Mary's. The Coolock campus is located in the outer Bendigo suburb of Junortoun and provides education for Years 7–9. The original St Mary's campus, located in the heart of Bendigo, provides education for Years 10–12, including the Victorian Certificate of Education and Victorian Certificate of Education Vocational Major.

Catherine McAuley College is governed by the Institute of Sisters of Mercy of Australia and Papua New Guinea.

== History ==
St Mary's (formerly Coolock) also changed its homeroom model to a vertical housegroup system. At Coolock, each house now has six Years 10 to 12 housegroups. At Coolock (formerly La Valla), each house has two Year 7 housegroups, two Year 8 housegroups and two Year 9 housegroups. The total number of housegroups across the college is 64. There are also two further housegroups, bringing the total to 66. In 2017 the Coolock site changed its homeroom to vertical, so it could bring the Years 7, 8 and 9 together.

=== 2018–present ===
In 2018 the college was renamed to Catherine McAuley College after the founder of the Sisters of Mercy, Catherine McAuley. At this time, both campuses were also renamed to reflect the history of the Mercy sisters and the college, with La Valla in Junortoun becoming Coolock, reflecting a location where Catherine McAuley undertook work, and Coolock becoming St Mary's, the name of the college prior to 1983.

== Notable Alumni ==
Jacinta Allan - Former Premier of Victoria

Amy Doak - Author

Margaret Hickey - Author

Angie Hogan - Singer

Georgia Delves - Singer

Kate DeAraugo - Singer, Australian Idol winner

Emma Dean - Masterchef Winner

Ryan McNaught - Lego builder, "Brickman"

Greg McLean - Director

Paul Williams - Director

Dale Vine - Landscaper and TV Personality

Joel Selwood - AFL Footballer

Adam Selwood - AFL Footballer

Scott Selwood - AFL Footballer

Jarryn Geary - AFL Footballer

Fergus Greene - AFL Footballer

Paul Sharkey - AFL Footballer

Tobie Travaglia - AFL Footballer

Archer Day-Wicks - AFL Footballer

Flynn Perez - AFL Footballer

Gerald Betts - AFL Footballer

Leigh Colbert - AFL Footballer

Graham Arthur - AFL Footballer

Geoff Southby - AFL Footballer

Bryde O'Rourke - AFLW Footballer

Jack Bouwmeester - NFL American Footballer

Sam Irwin-Hill - NFL American Footballer

Jennifer Harris - International Rugby Union player

Tayla Vlaeminck - International Cricketer

Chloe Watson - Vixens Netballer

Tessa Lavey - International Basketballer

Will Whiteacre - International Netballer

Aaron Wilson - International Lawn Bowler
