= Axe Creek =

- Suburb
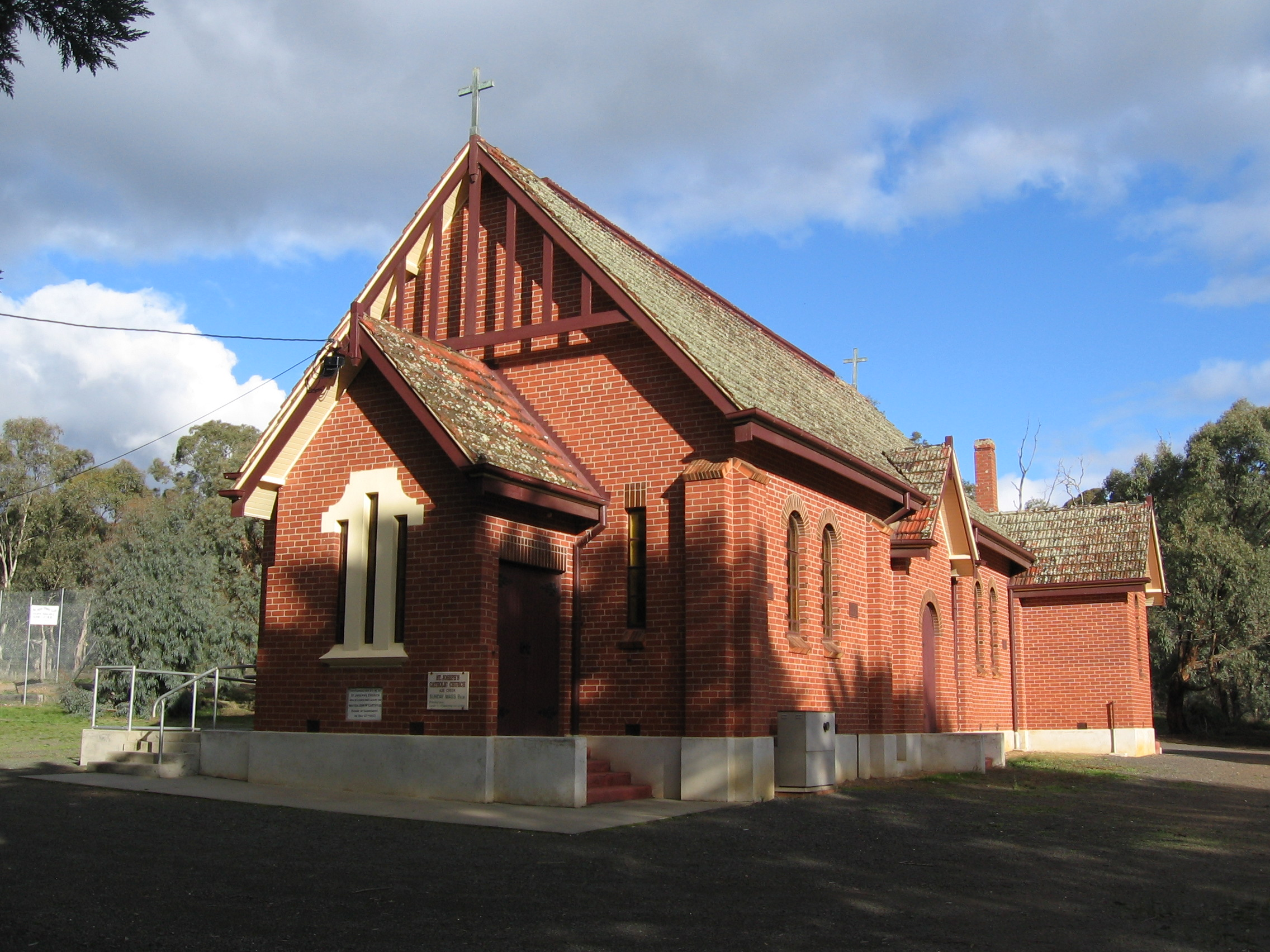
- Church located in Axe Creek

- Interactive map of Axe Creek
- Coordinates: 36°49′S 144°23′E
- Country: Australia
- State: Victoria
- City: Bendigo
- LGA: City of Greater Bendigo
- Location: 15 km (9.3 mi) SE of Bendigo; 7 km (4.3 mi) N of Sutton Grange; 143 km (89 mi) NW of Melbourne

Government
  - State electorate: Bendigo East
  - Federal division: Bendigo

Population
  - Total: 452 (2021 census)
- Postcode: 3557

Axe Creek is a locality in the City of Greater Bendigo, Victoria, Australia. At the 2021 census, Axe Creek had a population of 452.

Axe Creek is named after a nearby creek of the same name. The McIvor Highway passes through the north of Axe Creek.
