= Jennifer M. Harris =

American academic

Jennifer Harris
- Born: Jennifer Michelle Harris
- Education: Wake Forest University (BA); Pembroke College, Oxford (MPhil); Yale University (JD)
- Spouse: Alexander Post

Jennifer Michelle Harris is a scholar, who studies United States foreign policy and economics, and a former US government official.

== Early life ==
Harris' father is Ken Harris, a former Comanche County special district judge and her mother is Karen N. Youngblood, a former staff lawyer and political science professor at Cameron University.

== Education ==
Harris has a BA degree in economics and international relations from Wake Forest University in Winston-Salem, North Carolina. Harris has a master's degree in philosophy from Oxford University. Harris was a Harry S. Truman Scholarship recipient and a Rhodes Scholar. Harris has a JD from Yale Law School.

== Career ==
Harris started her career as a staff serving the U.S. National Intelligence Council with emphasis in economics and financial issues.

Harris was a senior fellow at the Council on Foreign Relations (CFR). Prior to joining CFR, Harris was a member of the policy planning staff at the U.S. Department of State responsible for global markets, geo-economic issues and energy security. In that role, Harris was a lead architect of Secretary of State Hillary Clinton's Economic Statecraft agenda, which launched in 2011.

In 2018, Harris became a Senior Fellow in Special Projects at William and Flora Hewlett Foundation. As of 2018, Harris is also a nonresident senior fellow in Foreign Policy at Brookings Institution.

Harris' work has appeared in the New York Times, Foreign Affairs, the Washington Quarterly, and the World Economic Forum among other outlets.

Harris is the co-author of War By Other Means: Geoeconomics and Statecraft.

Harris served as special assistant to the president and senior director, international economics on the National Security Council and National Economic Council (from 2021-23). She then returned to the Hewlett Foundation.

== Opinions ==
Harris is known for her opposition to Neoliberalism and preference for greater government involvement in strengthening the US economy.

For example, she has argued that the government needs to invest in infrastructure, child care, and education. These facilitate economic growth. She also opposes the concentration of power in the hands of very large corporations, supporting a "strong" antitrust policy.

== Personal life ==
On August 27, 2016, Harris married Alexander Jacob Post (a.k.a. Sasha) in California.

== Publications ==
- Blackwill, Robert D.; Harris, Jennifer M. (2016). War by Other Means: Geoeconomics and Statecraft. The Belknap Press of Harvard University Press. ISBN 9780674737211. OCLC 948071570.
- Harris, Jennifer; Sullivan, Jake (February 7, 2020). "America Needs a New Economic Philosophy. Foreign Policy Experts Can Help". ForeignPolicy.com.
- Harris, Jennifer (August 25, 2024). "Kamala Harris Begins to Sketch a New Economic Vision". New York Times.
