= Municipal Association of Victoria =

- Abbreviation: MAV
- Formation: 1879; 147 years ago
- Type: Legislated peak body
- Headquarters: Melbourne, Australia
- President: Jennifer Anderson
- Website: www.mav.asn.au

The Municipal Association of Victoria (MAV) is the legislated peak body for representing local governments in Victoria.

== Aims ==
The overall purpose of the MAV is to represent the interests of the 79 local governments in Victoria. Its stated roles are to support councils and councillors, provide a platform for advocacy, and promote the role of local government. The organisation also provides services to its member councils. These services include joint procurement, insurance, and policy advice.

== History ==
The Association was created in 1879 to represent the interests of local governments in Victoria. The Municipal Association Act 1907 of the Parliament of Victoria formally recognised the organisation as a peak body, primarily for the purpose of creating the Municipal Officers Fidelity Guarantee Fund.

=== 1994 council amalgamations ===
During the amalgamation of local councils in Victoria in the early 1990s, the MAV campaigned against the compulsory competitive tendering introduced for the 78 new councils created after the process, arguing that it had significant impacts on both council employees and residents.

Following the amalgamations and return of democratic government in 1996/97, the MAV ran a number of programs to monitor and support councils restructuring in the new process. This included the Step Asset Management Program, which eventually assessed a large number of primarily rural councils as being financially unsustainable.

=== 2015 Victorian Auditor-General's Report ===
In February 2015, the Victorian Auditor-General published a report into Local Government Victoria and the MAV on the effectiveness, efficiency and economy of the support provided to councils. It found serious structural and governance deficiencies in the MAV, prompting significant media coverage on its findings. The report questioned many aspects of the organisation's operations, including value for money of its procurement activities and lack of public accountability. The report's conclusions prompted Frankston City Council to leave the MAV in August 2015. It rejoined in August 2017 after a new council resolution was passed. Many other councils expressed similar concerns and considered ceasing their memberships, including the City of Monash, the Shire of Mitchell, and the City of Boroondara. Councillors from the cities of Yarra and Melbourne also expressed concerns over the report. Boroondara later withdrew its representation from the Association after a lengthy and public court battle with the City of Darebin, citing issues presented in the Auditor-General's report.

The MAV's initial response to the report disputed some of its key conclusions, including the premise that the MAV could be subject to the direction of the state government. However, following the appointment of a new board in March 2015 and a motion from the State Council in early 2016, independent auditors and consultants through Ernst & Young and Deloitte have been appointed to oversee the implementation of the report's recommendations.

== Structure ==
=== Board ===
The Board of the MAV is made up of councillors from its members’ councils. It consists of 12 members elected by councils in each region and a directly elected president. Elections are conducted once every two years.

=== State Council ===
The State Council operates as the governing body of the Association. It is made up of single representatives from all member councils who formulate, debate, and vote on the operations of the MAV. This includes association rules, policies, and strategic planning.

== Members ==
All Victorian local governments are members of the MAV. The City of Frankston withdrew in 2015 but rejoined in August 2017 after a new council resolution was passed. The City of Boroondara resolved to withdraw its representation to the Association in December 2016, preventing Cr Coral Ross from contesting the presidency of the MAV. Cr Ross was later elected president of the MAV in 2019.

== See also ==
- Australian Local Government Association
- Local Government Association of South Australia
