= Michael Sexton (footballer) =

Australian rules footballer

Personal information
- Full name: Michael Sexton
- Born: 5 March 1971 (age 55); Papua New Guinea
- Original team: Sandhurst
- Draft: No. 54, 1988 national draft
- Height: 192 cm (6 ft 4 in)
- Weight: 92 kg (203 lb)

Playing career^{1}
Years	Club	Games (Goals)
1990 – 2000	Carlton	200 (23)
- ^{1} Playing statistics correct to the end of 2000.

Career highlights
- Club: Premiership: 1995

Michael Sexton (born 5 March 1971) is a former Australian rules footballer who played for Carlton between 1990 and 2000 in the Australian Football League.

A defender, Sexton was a member of Carlton's 1995 premiership team and an All-Australian in both 1996 and 1997. He was recruited from the Sandhurst Dragons.

Sexton is the brother of Ben and the cousin of Damian, who both also played in the AFL. Brother, Matthew, went pick 30 to Richmond in the 1986 AFL draft.

Sexton is member of the AFL "Laws of the Game", aka the Rules Committee.

== Statistics ==
Legend
G	Goals	K	Kicks	D	Disposals	T	Tackles
B	Behinds	H	Handballs	M	Marks

Season	Team	No.	Games	Totals							Averages (per game)							Votes
Season	Team	No.	Games	G	B	K	H	D	M	T	G	B	K	H	D	M	T	Votes
1990	Carlton	14	3	1	1	13	10	23	7	4	0.3	0.3	4.3	3.3	7.7	2.3	1.3	0
1991	Carlton	14	13	0	2	100	34	134	33	15	0.0	0.2	7.7	2.6	10.3	2.5	1.2	0
1992	Carlton	14	19	1	1	162	69	231	70	23	0.1	0.1	8.5	3.6	12.2	3.7	1.2	0
1993	Carlton	14	23	3	5	252	111	363	129	27	0.1	0.2	11.0	4.8	15.8	5.6	1.2	4
1994	Carlton	14	24	1	4	226	117	343	93	25	0.0	0.2	9.4	4.9	14.3	3.9	1.0	0
1995†	Carlton	14	25	3	3	271	99	370	116	23	0.1	0.1	10.8	4.0	14.8	4.6	0.9	2
1996	Carlton	14	23	2	2	268	115	383	102	24	0.1	0.1	11.6	5.0	16.6	4.4	1.0	6
1997	Carlton	14	18	4	0	236	82	318	93	13	0.2	0.0	13.1	4.6	17.7	5.2	0.7	2
1998	Carlton	14	22	3	6	267	104	371	100	20	0.1	0.3	12.1	4.7	16.9	4.5	0.9	0
1999	Carlton	14	24	5	5	248	118	366	94	22	0.2	0.2	10.3	4.9	15.3	3.9	0.9	2
2000	Carlton	14	6	0	1	44	23	67	17	5	0.0	0.2	7.3	3.8	11.2	2.8	0.8	0
Career			200	23	30	2087	882	2969	854	201	0.1	0.2	10.4	4.4	14.8	4.3	1.0	16
