= Longlea =

- Suburb
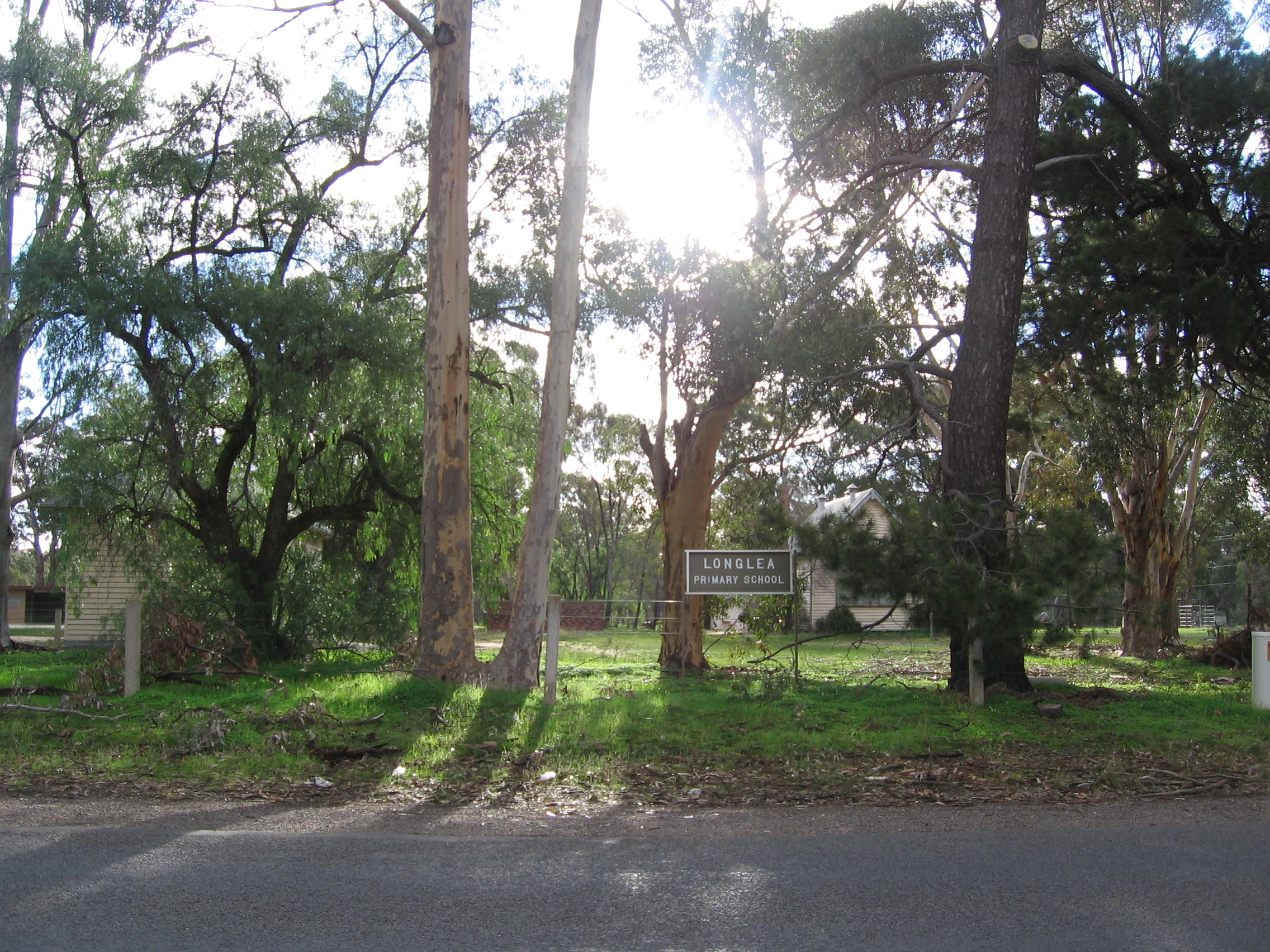
- The primary school, now closed

- Interactive map of Longlea
- Coordinates: 36°46′33″S 144°25′45″E
- Country: Australia
- State: Victoria
- City: Bendigo
- LGA: City of Greater Bendigo
- Location: 13 km (8.1 mi) E of Bendigo

Government
  - State electorate: Bendigo East
  - Federal division: Bendigo

Population
  - Total: 506 (2016 census)
- Postcode: 3551

Longlea is a locality in the City of Greater Bendigo, Victoria, Australia 13 kilometres (8.1 mi) east of the Bendigo central business district and approximately 150 kilometres (93 mi) North-West (by road) from the Victorian Capital of Melbourne. At the 2016 census, Longlea had a population of 506. Longlea is named after Shire of Strathfieldsaye councillor W. J. Long, who owned a property in the area.
