= Bendigo TAFE =

Vocational and technical college in Victoria, Australia

Coordinates: 36°45′26″S 144°16′59″E

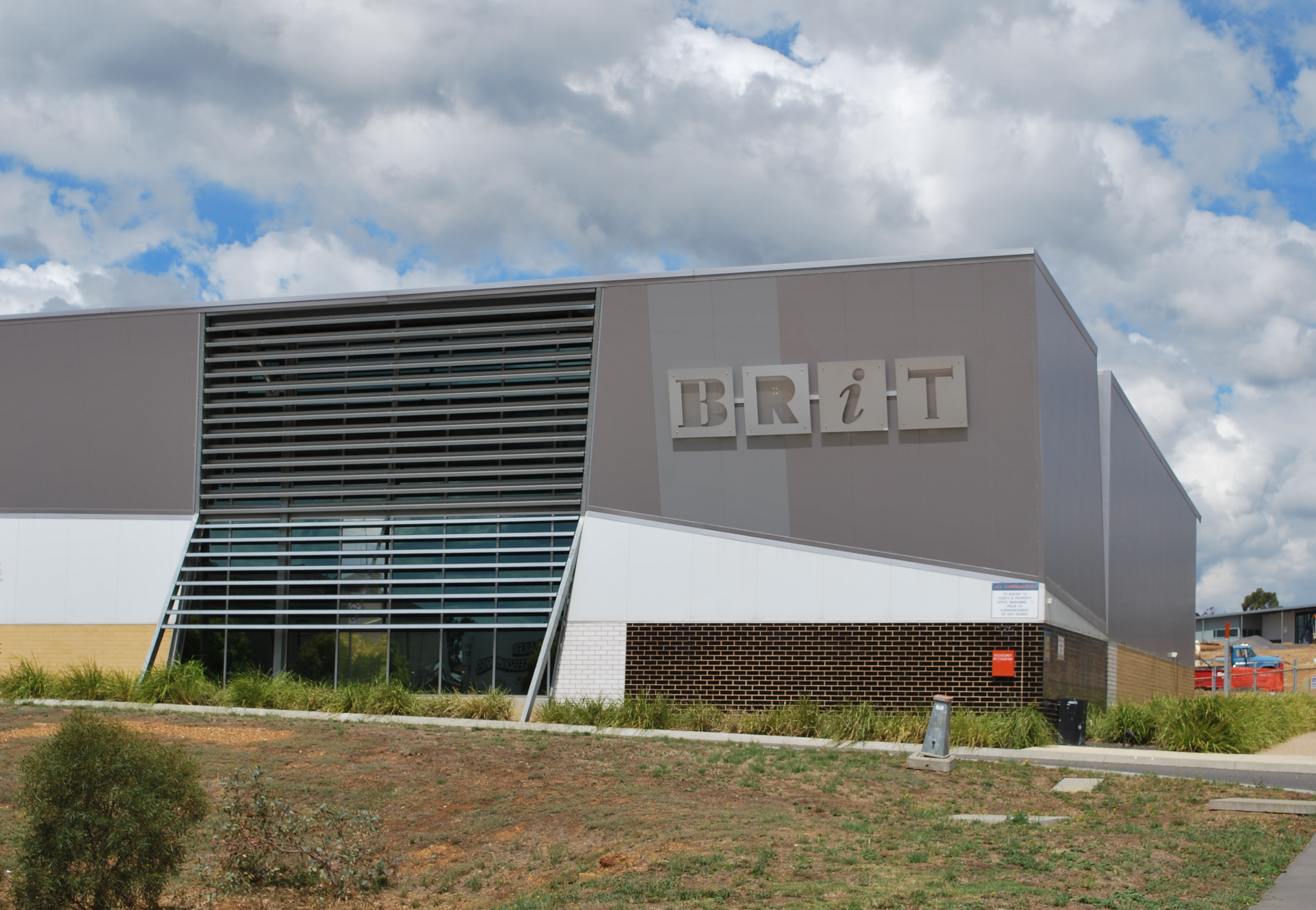
- Building on the East Bendigo campus
- Type: TAFE institute
- Established: 1987 but with antecedents back to 1854
- Students: 14,000
- Location: Bendigo, Victoria, Australia
- Campus: Bendigo, Castlemaine, Echuca
- Website: bendigotafe.edu.au

Bendigo TAFE is a regional provider of vocational education, training and assessment services, located in northern and central Victoria, Australia. (TAFE = Technical and Further Education) The institute has been in operation in various guises since 1854. The institute was known as the Loddon Campaspe Institute of TAFE from 1987 to 1990, Bendigo Regional Institute of TAFE (BRIT) from 1990 to 2009, before becoming Bendigo TAFE in 2009.

Bendigo TAFE services a significant geographical area of approximately 25,000 square kilometres in central and northern Victoria, with a local population of 220,000.

In May 2014, Bendigo TAFE announced that it would merge with the Melbourne-based Kangan Institute to form Bendigo Kangan Institute, however both institutes retain their existing branding.

Bendigo TAFE has five campuses, three in Bendigo, one in Echuca and another in Castlemaine.

== Areas of study ==
- Aged care
- Allied health
- Design
- Automotive
- Business and HR services
- Carpentry and joinery
- Children's services studies
- Community services
- Conservation and land management
- Design and drafting
- Disability services
- Educational pathways
- Electrical / electronics
- Engineering
- English language
- Food hygiene and food processing
- General education for adults
- Hairdressing
- Beauty
- Hospitality
- Information and communications technology
- Management
- Mechanical
- Metal fabrication
- Nursing
- Painting and decorating
- Plumbing
- Primary industries
- Animal studies
- International education
- Laboratory studies
- Horticulture and agriculture
- Professional writing and editing
- VCAL
