= Barry Lyons (mayor) =

Bendigo politician (1945–2024)

Mayor of the City of Greater Bendigo
- In office 2013–2014
- Preceded by: Lisa Ruffell
- Succeeded by: Peter Cox

Councillor of the City of Greater Bendigo for Lockwood Ward
- In office 2012–2016

Councillor of the City of Greater Bendigo for Kangaroo Flat Ward
- In office 2008–2012
- Preceded by: David Jones
- Succeeded by: Ward Abolished

Councillor of the Shire of Romsey for Lancefield Riding

Personal details
- Born: 10 May 1945
- Died: 19 October 2024 (aged 79)
- Spouse: Betty McPherson (m. 1964)
- Children: 5

Laurence "Barry" Lyons (10 May 1945 – 19 October 2024) was an Australian politician who served as mayor of the City of Greater Bendigo from 2013 to 2014, as a councillor of the City of Greater Bendigo from 2008 to 2016, and as a councillor of the Shire of Romsey in the 1970s.

== Political career ==
Lyons served as a member of the Shire of Romsey council in the 1970s, as a councillor for Lancefield Riding.

Lyons was first elected to the City of Greater Bendigo council in the 2008 election in the Kangaroo Flat Ward, achieving 42.04% of the primary vote and 51.76% of the two-candidate preferred vote, defeating incumbent councillor and former mayor David Jones.

In the 2012 election, Lyons contested the Lockwood Ward after new three-ward structure was introduced. He was elected with 12.66% of the vote.

In November 2013, Lyons was elected mayor by the council for a one-year term. He held the role during a period that included significant public debate over the proposed construction of a mosque in the city. Lyons oversaw the development and completion of several infrastructure projects, including the Kangaroo Flat Leisure Centre (now Gurri Wanyarra) indoor pool, the redevelopment of the Bendigo Library, and the expansion of the Bendigo Art Gallery. He was involved in collaboration between local and state governments to support regional development, including sporting facility upgrades and investment initiatives.

In the 2016 election, Lyons lost his seat after winning only 9.78% of the primary vote. Lyons once again contested Lockwood Ward in the 2020 election, achieving 13.42% of the primary vote, but failed to win a seat.

== Personal life ==
Lyons married Betty McPherson on 30 October 1964. They had five children. In November 2023, Lyons was diagnosed with motor neuron disease. He died on 19 October 2024, aged 79, shortly before his 60th wedding anniversary.
