= 2023 AFL Women's draft =

Ninth AFL Women's (AFLW) draft

General information
- Date(s): 18 December 2023
- Network(s): Fox Footy
- Sponsored by: National Australia Bank

Overview
- League: AFL Women's
- First selection: Kristie-Lee Weston-Turner (Western Bulldogs)

The 2023 AFL Women's draft was the annual draft that enabled the 18 clubs in the AFL Women's (AFLW) competition to recruit players following the 2023 AFL Women's season. It was held on 18 December 2023.

== Player movement period ==
The player movement period ran from November 2023 to March 2024.

== National draft ==
The final draft order was finalised on 17 December, with the draft taking place the following night.

A	Academy selection
FD	Father–daughter selection

Rd.	Pick	Player	Club	Recruited from		Notes
Rd.	Pick	Player	Club	Club	League	Notes
1	1	Kristie-Lee Weston-Turner	Western Bulldogs	Western Jets	Talent League Girls	
1	2	Jess Rentsch	West Coast	Greater Western Victoria Rebels	Talent League Girls	
1	3	Kaitlyn Srhoj	Greater Western Sydney	Peel Thunder	WAFL Women's	
1	4	Brooke Barwick	Western Bulldogs	Tasmania Devils	Talent League Girls	Received from Port Adelaide
1	5	Alyssia Pisano	Melbourne	Eastern Ranges	Talent League Girls	Received from Hawthorn
1	6	Elaine Grigg	Western Bulldogs	Central District	SANFL Women's	Received from Fremantle
1	7	Lila Keck	Carlton	Bendigo Pioneers	Talent League Girls	
1	8	Georgia Clark	Collingwood	Tasmania Devils	Talent League Girls	
1	9	Lucy Cronin	Collingwood	Oakleigh Chargers	Talent League Girls	Received from Richmond
1	10	Kiera Whiley	St Kilda	Western Jets	Talent League Girls	
1	11	Cleo Buttifant	Western Bulldogs	GWS Academy/Turvey Park	Riverina FNLW	Received from Richmond; originally from Collingwood (Note: Band one compensation for the loss of Chloe Molloy)
1	12	Ryleigh Wotherspoon	Melbourne	Sherwood Districts	QFAW Division 1	Received from Brisbane (Note: Band one compensation for the loss of Emily Bates)
1	13	Isabel Bacon	Richmond	Sandringham Dragons	Talent League Girls	Received from Essendon
1	14	Kayley Kavanagh	West Coast	Calder Cannons	Talent League Girls	Received from Gold Coast
1	15	Evie Long (A (Note: Matched bid from Sydney))	Brisbane	Brisbane Academy/Sandgate	QFAW Division 1	
1	16	Sarah Grunden	Sydney	Calder Cannons	Talent League Girls	
1	17	Mikayla Williamson	Hawthorn	Dandenong Stingrays	Talent League Girls	Received from Melbourne
1	18	Chantal Mason	Geelong	Geelong Falcons	Talent League Girls	
1	19	Piper Window	Port Adelaide	Glenelg	SANFL Women's	Received from Adelaide
1	20	Emily Gough	Essendon	Sandringham Dragons	Talent League Girls	Received from Melbourne; originally from North Melbourne
1	21	Sophie Peters (A)	Brisbane	Brisbane Academy/Maroochydore	QAFL Women's	Received from Port Adelaide; originally from Carlton (Note: Band two compensation for the loss of Lucy McEvoy)
2	22	Brooke Boileau	Adelaide	South Adelaide	SANFL Women's	Received from Western Bulldogs
2	23	Bryde O'Rourke (FD (Note: Matched bid from Melbourne))	Geelong	Bendigo Pioneers	Talent League Girls	Received from Brisbane (Note: Band three compensation for the loss of Greta Bodey)
2	24	Jacinta Hose	Melbourne	Eastern Ranges	Talent League Girls	Received from West Coast
2	25	Alissa Brook	Port Adelaide	South Adelaide	SANFL Women's	Received from West Coast; previously from Brisbane; originally from Greater Western Sydney
2	26	Ella Slocombe	North Melbourne	Claremont	WAFL Women's	Received from Carlton; originally from Port Adelaide
2	27	Indiana Williams (A (Note: Matched bid from Adelaide))	Brisbane	Brisbane Academy/Maroochydore	QAFL Women's	Received from Collingwood; originally from St Kilda
2	28	Tamara Henry	Adelaide	Western Jets	Talent League Girls	Received from Melbourne; originally from Hawthorn
2	29	Jemma Rigoni (FD (Note: Matched bid from North Melbourne))	Melbourne	Oakleigh Chargers	Talent League Girls	Received from Adelaide (Note: Band four compensation for the loss of Ashleigh Saint)
2	30	Georgia Stubs	North Melbourne	Eastern Ranges	Talent League Girls	Received from Gold Coast; previously from West Coast; originally from Fremantle
2	31	Meg Robertson (FD)	Carlton	Dandenong Stingrays	Talent League Girls	
2	32	Amber Schutte	Collingwood	Gippsland Power	Talent League Girls	Received back from Richmond after originally holding the pick
2	33	Lara Hausegger	Sydney	Oakleigh Chargers	Talent League Girls	Received from Greater Western Sydney; originally from Richmond
2	34	Lily Tarlinton	Adelaide	Bond University	QAFL Women's	Received from Essendon
2	35	Rania Crozier (A)	Brisbane	Brisbane Academy/Aspley	QAFL Women's	Received from Greater Western Sydney; originally from Sydney
2	36	Keely Fullerton	Gold Coast	Bendigo Pioneers	Talent League Girls	Received from North Melbourne; originally from Melbourne
2	37	Jacinta Baldwick (A)	Brisbane	Brisbane Academy/Coorparoo	QAFL Women's	Received from Geelong
2	38	Chloe Adams	Essendon	Geelong Falcons	Talent League Girls	Received from Adelaide
2	39	Georgie Cleaver	West Coast	East Fremantle	WAFL Women's	Received from Gold Coast; originally from North Melbourne
2	40	Indigo Linde	Greater Western Sydney	Eastern Ranges	Talent League Girls	Received from Brisbane
3	41	Pass	Geelong	—		Received from Brisbane; originally from Western Bulldogs
3	42	Matilda Sergeant	West Coast	Claremont	WAFL Women's	
3	43	Mackenzie Ford	Richmond	Tasmania Devils	Talent League Girls	Received from Greater Western Sydney
3	44	Taya Oliver	Gold Coast	Coorparoo	QAFL Women's	Received from Port Adelaide
3	45	Sophie Butterworth	Hawthorn	Dandenong Stingrays	Talent League Girls	
3	46	Lucy Burke	North Melbourne	Relisted		Received from Carlton
3	47	Charlotte Simpson (FD)	St Kilda	Geelong Cats	VFL Women's	
3	48	Jorja Borg	Western Bulldogs	Western Bulldogs (Note: Borg was a train-on player with the Western Bulldogs in 2023)	AFL Women's	Received from Fremantle (Note: Band five compensation for the loss of Janelle Cuthbertson)
3	49	Holly Ifould	Fremantle	South Adelaide	SANFL Women's	Received from Greater Western Sydney; previously from St Kilda; originally from North Melbourne (Note: Band five compensation for the loss of Brooke Brown)
3	50	Kiara Bischa (A)	Gold Coast	Gold Coast Academy/Bond University	QAFL Women's	Received from Essendon
3	51	Sienna McMullen (A)	Gold Coast	Gold Coast Academy/Bond University	QAFL Women's	
3	52	Annabel Kievit	Gold Coast	Waratah Football Club	NTFL Women's	Received from Sydney
4	53	Pass	Greater Western Sydney	—		Received from Fremantle; originally from Western Bulldogs
4	54	Airlie Runnalls	Fremantle	Relisted		Received from Greater Western Sydney; previously from Brisbane; originally from Sydney
4	55	Delany Madigan	Melbourne	Eastern Ranges	Talent League Girls	
4	56	Pass	North Melbourne	—		
5	57	Pass	Melbourne	—		

== Rookie signings ==
Player	Club	Date	Other/former sport	Ref.
Verity Simmons	West Coast	7 December 2023	Netball	
Muireann Atkinson	Collingwood	11 December 2023	Gaelic football	
Amy Boyle-Carr	Adelaide	21 December 2023	Gaelic football	
Grace Beasley	Melbourne	15 February 2024	Basketball	
Bláithín Bogue	North Melbourne	2 March 2024	Gaelic football	
Kate Kenny	Geelong	5 March 2024	Gaelic football	
Eilish O'Dowd	Greater Western Sydney	6 March 2024	Gaelic football	

== See also ==
- 2023 AFL draft
