= Ben Sexton =

Australian rules footballer (born 1972)

Personal information
- Full name: Benjamin David Sexton
- Born: 29 October 1972 (age 54); Papua New Guinea
- Original team: Sandhurst
- Draft: No. 86, 1988 national draft
- Height: 191 cm (6 ft 3 in)
- Weight: 90 kg (198 lb)

Playing career^{1}
Years	Club	Games (Goals)
1991–95	Footscray	39 (32)
1996	Carlton	4 (1)
Total		43 (33)
- ^{1} Playing statistics correct to the end of 1996.

Benjamin David Sexton (born 29 October 1972 in Papua New Guinea) is a former Australian rules footballer who played for Footscray and Carlton in the Australian Football League (AFL) during the 1990s.

Born in Papua New Guinea, Sexton played his early football in the Bendigo Football League where he took the field for Sandhurst. Footscray picked him up with the 86th pick of the 1988 VFL draft and he kicked five goals and three behinds on his league debut, against the Brisbane Bears at Western Oval. He kicked another three goals the following round but was dropped four weeks later after struggling for form. The 1992 AFL season was spent mostly as a defender but he could never establish his place in the Footscray team, although he put in the occasional good performance when pushed forward such as a haul of six goals and four behinds in a win over North Melbourne at the MCG in 1993.

Sexton joined his brother Michael at Carlton in 1996, having been traded for inconsistent forward James Cook. Carlton had won the premiership the previous year and Sexton was only able to break into the side on four occasions. Sexton decided to retire from the AFL mid contract and return to the country to play for his former Bendigo Football League club Sandhurst. Sexton was an important member of the club's 2004 premiership team.
