= Strathdale =

Strathdale Bendigo, Victoria
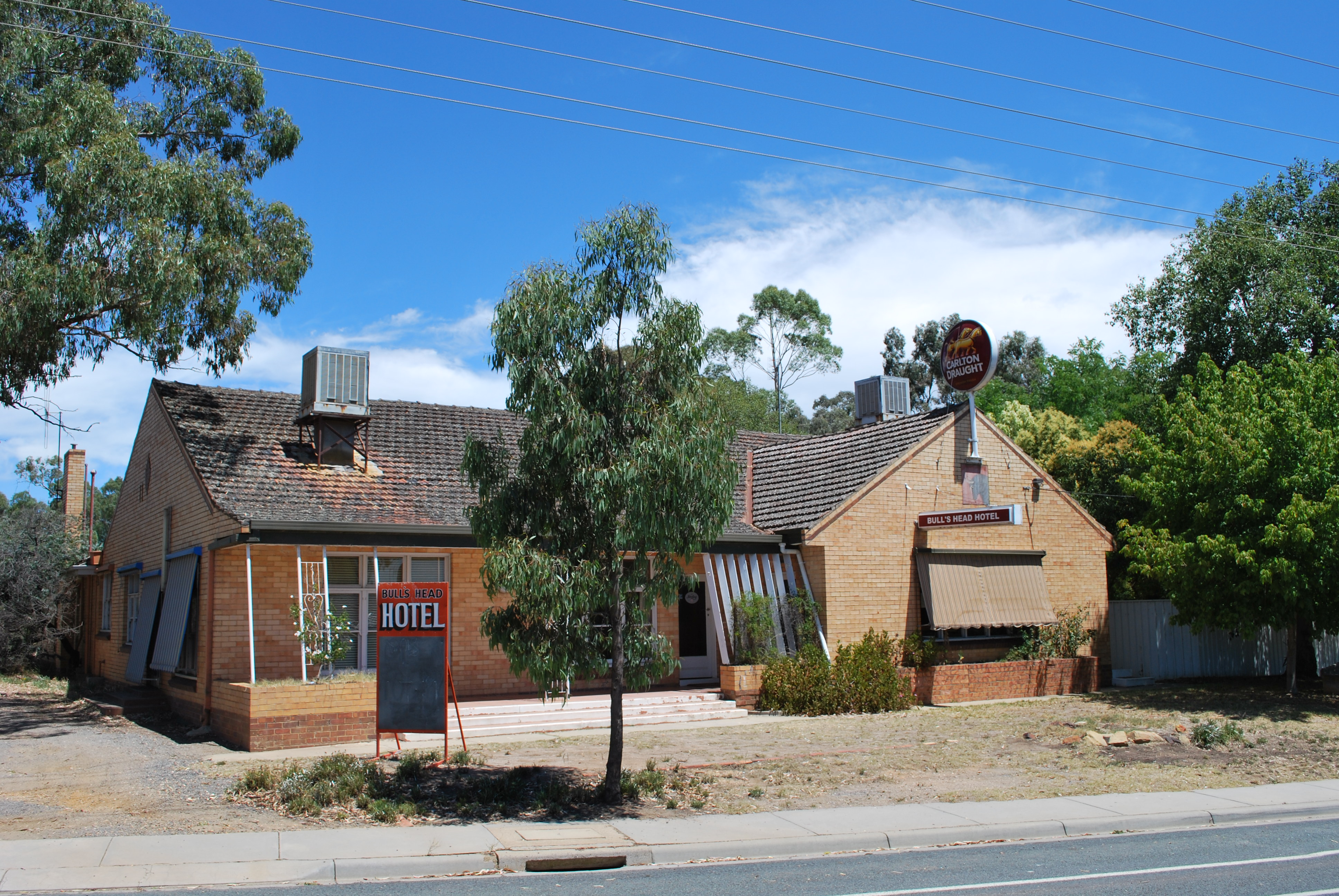
- The Bulls Head Hotel in Strathdale, now closed, 2010

- Coordinates: 36°45′33″S 144°18′56″E
- Population: 5,663 (2016 census)
- Postcode(s): 3550
- Location: 3 km (2 mi) E of Bendigo
- LGA(s): City of Greater Bendigo
- State electorate(s): Bendigo East
- Federal division(s): Bendigo

Strathdale is a suburb of the regional city of Bendigo in north central Victoria, Australia, 3 kilometres (1.9 mi) east of the Bendigo city centre. Victory Christian College is located in Strathdale.

At the 2016 census, Strathdale had a population of 5,663.
