= East Bendigo =

- Suburb
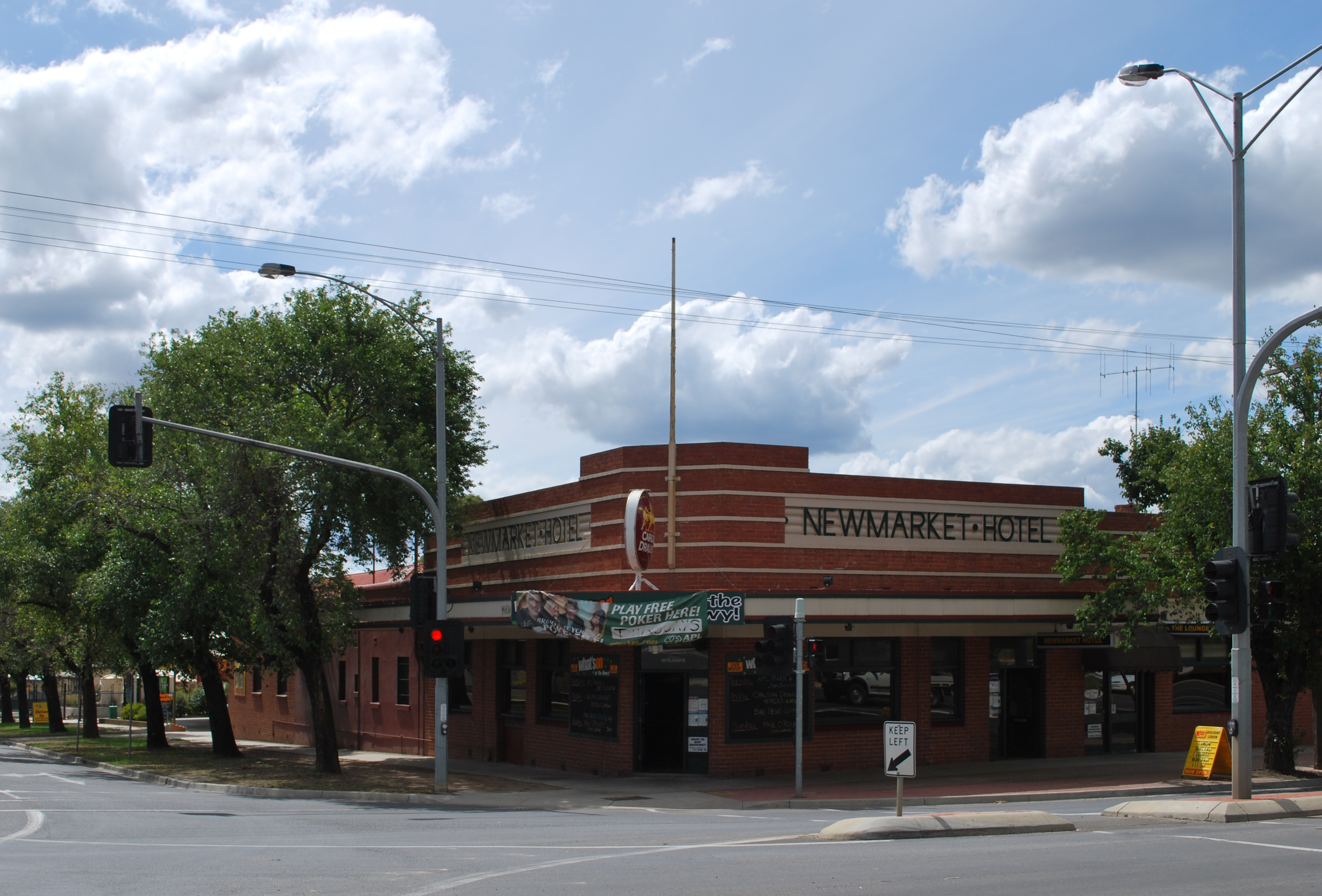
- Newmarket Hotel in East Bendigo, 2010

- Interactive map of East Bendigo
- Coordinates: 36°45′5″S 144°17′44″E
- Country: Australia
- State: Victoria
- City: Bendigo
- LGA: City of Greater Bendigo
- Location: 2 km (1.2 mi) NE of Bendigo

Government
  - State electorate: Bendigo East
  - Federal division: Bendigo

Population
  - Total: 2,246 (2021 census)
- Postcode: 3550

East Bendigo is a suburb of the regional city of Bendigo in north central Victoria, Australia, 2 kilometres (1.2 mi) north east of the Bendigo city centre.

At the 2021 census, East Bendigo had a population of 2,246. A primary school was opened in 1916 and closed in 1998.
