= Merv Hicks (Australian footballer) =

Australian rules footballer

Personal information
- Full name: Mervyn Ernest Hicks
- Born: 21 August 1936
- Died: 14 December 2013 (aged 77); Shepparton, Victoria
- Original team: Mooroopna
- Height: 188 cm (6 ft 2 in)
- Weight: 89 kg (196 lb)

Playing career^{1}
Years	Club	Games (Goals)
1956, 1959	Collingwood	6 (7)
- ^{1} Playing statistics correct to the end of 1959.

Mervyn Ernest "Merv" Hicks (21 August 1936 – 14 December 2013) was an Australian rules footballer who played with Collingwood in the Victorian Football League (VFL).

Hicks was from Numurkah, but was playing with Mooroopna when signed by Collingwood. He played twice for Collingwood in the 1956 VFL season but was unable to get a game over the next two years. On his return, against Footscray in round six of the 1959 season, Hicks was used as a full-forward and kicked five goals. It would however be one of only four games he played that season and he opted to continue his career at Northcote.

He applied for the vacant senior coaching position at South Bendigo for the 1961 season but lost out to Alan McDonald. Instead he was signed by another Bendigo Football League club, Eaglehawk, as their first choice, Geelong's Les Borrack had been unable to get a transfer from his employers. In his first season at Eaglehawk he topped the league's goal-kicking with 64 goals.
