= Mick Lenaghan =

Australian rules footballer

Personal information
- Full name: Michael Lenaghan
- Born: 15 July 1958 (age 68)
- Original team: Sandhurst
- Height: 181 cm (5 ft 11 in)
- Weight: 78 kg (172 lb)

Playing career^{1}
Years	Club	Games (Goals)
1984–1986	Geelong	22 (13)
- ^{1} Playing statistics correct to the end of 1986.

Michael Lenaghan (born 15 July 1958) is a former Australian rules footballer who played with Geelong in the Victorian Football League (VFL).

Before arriving at Geelong, Lenaghan had played in four Bendigo Football League (BFL) premierships with Sandhurst (1977, 1978, 1981, 1983). He kicked the winning goal against Golden Square in the 1978 grand final, won the Michelsen Medal when they were premiers in 1981 and was captain of the 1983 premiership team.

In 1982 he played a season with the Carlton reserves.

Lenaghan went to Geelong in 1984 and played five senior games that year, two of them with his brother Denis Lenaghan. He made nine appearances in 1985 and a further eight in 1986.
