= Fergus Greene =

Australian rules footballer

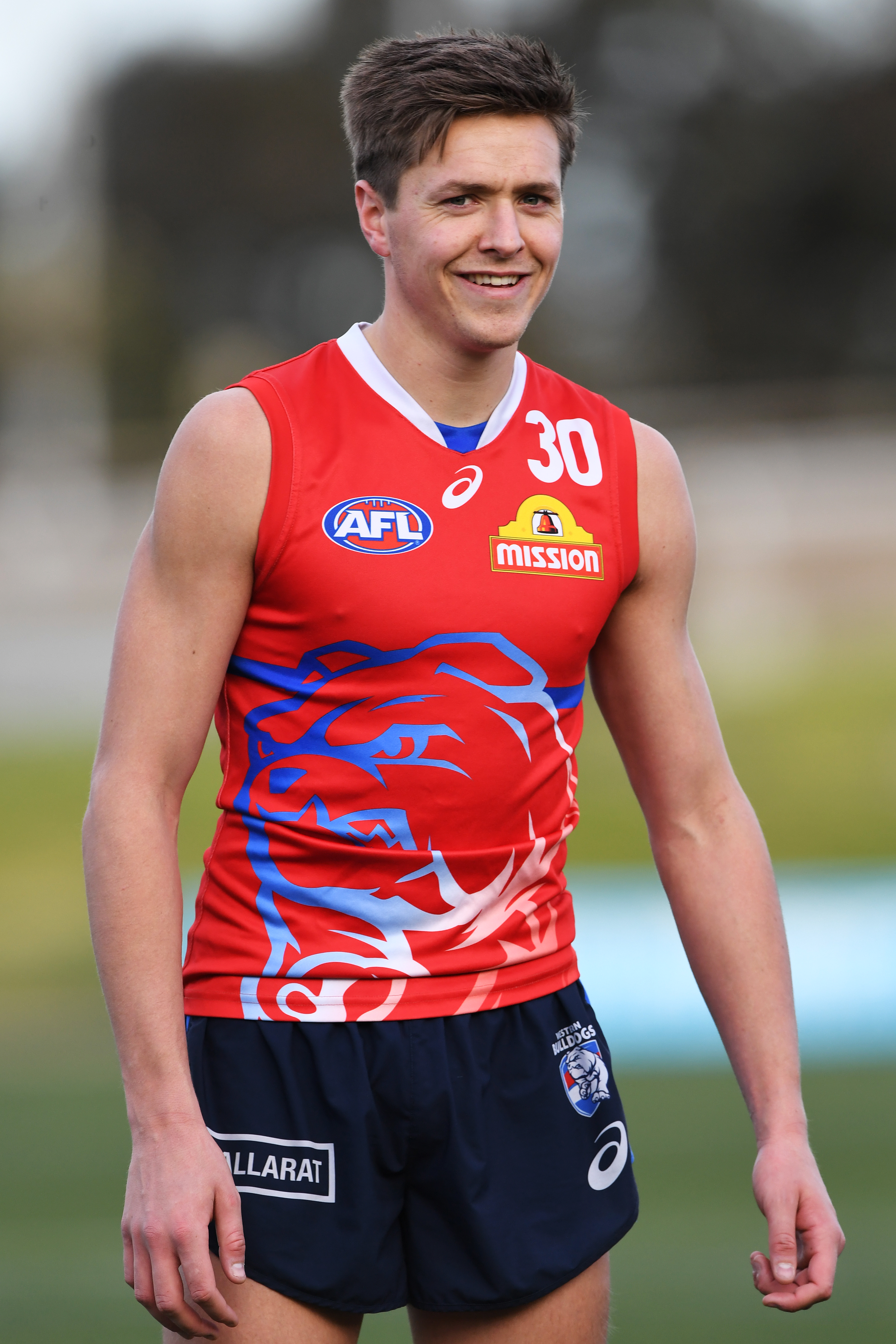
- Greene in August 2018

Personal information
- Born: 20 December 1997 (age 28)
- Original team: Sandhurst
- Draft: No. 70, 2016 national draft
- Debut: 29 July 2018, Western Bulldogs vs. Port Adelaide, at Eureka Stadium
- Height: 187 cm (6 ft 2 in)
- Weight: 75 kg (165 lb)
- Position: Forward

Club information
- Current club: Sandhurst
- Number: 6

Playing career^{1}
Years	Club	Games (Goals)
2017–2020	Western Bulldogs	5 (5)
2023	Hawthorn	11 (15)
Total		16 (20)
- ^{1} Playing statistics correct to the end of 2023.

Career highlights
- 2× Box Hill leading goalkicker: 2021, 2022

Fergus Greene (born 20 December 1997) is an Australian rules footballer who currently plays for the Sandhurst Football Club in the Bendigo Football Netball League (BFNL). He previously played for the Western Bulldogs and Hawthorn in the Australian Football League (AFL), making his debut in round 19 of the 2018 season.

== Career ==
Greene played junior football for Sandhurst and Catholic College Bendigo. In 2015, he suffered a navicular bone injury, but returned in 2016 and played well in the first half of the season. He was recruited by the Bendigo Pioneers and played five TAC Cup games in 2016. He recorded a 15.6 beep test at the Rookie Me Combine, the best time recorded nationally before the 2016 AFL draft. He was selected by the Western Bulldogs with their fourth selection, pick 70, in the 2016 national draft.

In 2017, he kicked three goals on his Victorian Football League (VFL) debut in round 4 and followed up with five goals against Werribee the next week. However, he was restricted to eight VFL games for the year by a broken wrist – which kept him out for eight weeks – and cracked ribs later in the season. In 2018, he played in the inaugural AFLX pre-season competition and showed strong form in his first nine VFL matches. Coach Steve Grace was "super pleased" with Greene and praised his maturity and mental improvement. He played 14 VFL matches and kicked 18 goals before his round 19 AFL debut. On debut, Greene kicked a goal from a 30 m (98 ft) set shot in the second quarter, laid five tackles and amassed five disposals.

Greene had been compared to fellow Bulldogs forward Tory Dickson – the two were both late developers and have reliable set shot routines, innate 'goal sense' and forward pressure.

Greene was delisted at the conclusion of the 2020 AFL season after playing just 5 games, all in the 2018 AFL season.

Greene played for the Box Hill Hawks in the VFL in 2021 and 2022. He kicked 30 goals in 2021 and 53 goals in 2022, and was signed by Hawthorn as a delisted free agent at the end of the 2022 VFL season. He was delisted at the end of the 2023 AFL season after kicking 15 goals from 11 games.

Following his AFL delisting, Greene returned to Sandhurst for the 2024 Bendigo Football Netball League (BFNL) season. He was part of the club's 2024 premiership victory over Gisborne.

== Statistics ==
Updated as of the end of 2023.

Legend
G	Goals	K	Kicks	D	Disposals	T	Tackles
B	Behinds	H	Handballs	M	Marks

Season	Team	No.	Games	Totals							Averages (per game)							Votes
Season	Team	No.	Games	G	B	K	H	D	M	T	G	B	K	H	D	M	T	Votes
2017	Western Bulldogs	30	0	—	—	—	—	—	—	—	—	—	—	—	—	—	—	0
2018	Western Bulldogs	30	5	5	6	27	17	44	18	15	1.0	1.2	5.4	3.4	8.8	3.6	3.0	0
2019	Western Bulldogs	30	0	—	—	—	—	—	—	—	—	—	—	—	—	—	—	0
2020 (Note: The 2020 season was played with 17 home-and-away matches per team (down from 22) and 16-minute quarters with time on (down from 20-minute quarters with time on) due to the impact of the COVID-19 pandemic.)	Western Bulldogs	30	0	—	—	—	—	—	—	—	—	—	—	—	—	—	—	0
2023	Hawthorn	26	11	15	10	56	33	89	38	10	1.4	0.9	5.1	3.0	8.1	3.5	0.9	0
Career			16	20	16	83	50	133	56	25	1.3	1.0	5.2	3.1	8.3	3.5	1.6	0

== Honours and achievements ==
Individual

- 2× Box Hill leading goalkicker: 2021, 2022

== Personal life ==
Greene is the son of Chris Greene and Anne Hartney and the nephew of former Carlton player Brendan Hartney.
