= Joe Canavan =

Australian rules footballer (1880–1924)

Personal information
- Full name: Joseph Canavan
- Born: 4 November 1880
- Died: 10 January 1924 (aged 43); Wentworth, New South Wales
- Original team: South Bendigo

Playing career^{1}
Years	Club	Games (Goals)
1903	South Melbourne	8 (7)
1907	Melbourne	9 (4)
Total		17 (11)
- ^{1} Playing statistics correct to the end of 1907.

Joseph Canavan (4 November 1880 – 10 January 1924) was an Australian rules footballer who played with South Melbourne and Melbourne in the Victorian Football League (VFL).

He drowned in Rufus Creek near Wentworth, New South Wales in 1924.
