= Bendigo Football Netball League =

Australian rules football and netball competition

- Current season, competition or edition: 2025
- Sport: Australian rules football Netball
- Founded: 10 June 1881; 145 years ago
- CEO: Tom King
- President: Carol McKinstry
- No. of teams: 9
- Country: Australia
- Confederation: AFL Victoria
- Most recent champion: Gisborne (2026)
- Most titles: Sandhurst (29)
- Sponsor: Bendigo Bank
- Level on pyramid: 1
- Related competitions: List: VFL; HDFL; LVFL
- Website: bendigofnl.com.au

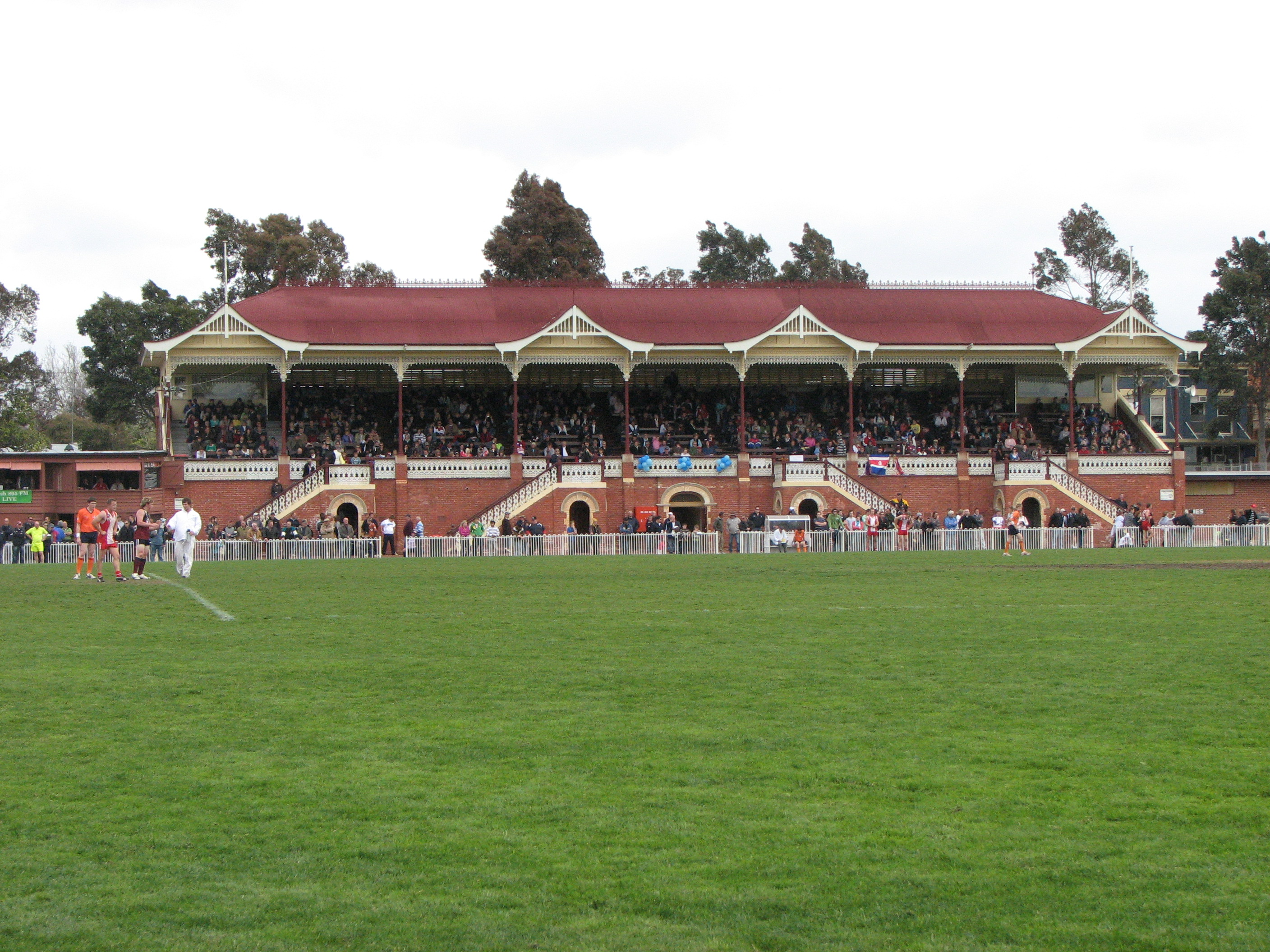
Queen Elizabeth Oval, 2007

The Bendigo Football Netball League (previously known as the Bendigo and District Football Association, Bendigo Football Association and Bendigo Football League) is an Australian rules football and netball competition based in the Bendigo region of Victoria.

== History ==
Football in Bendigo appears to have been first played with a match between the Sandhurst Football Club and the Volunteers Football Club in July 1861.

Formed on 10 June 1881 by the city's three clubs (Bendigo, Coachbuilders and Sandhurst) as the Sandhurst Football Association.

Bendigo FC won both the 1886 and 1887 premiership and not Eaglehawk as previously recorded on this page. Sandhurst FC were undefeated premiers in 1889 and not Eaglehawk FC as previously recorded on this page. Eaglehawk FC won the 1900 premiership and not South Bendigo as previously recorded on this page.

It is one of the oldest football leagues in Australia, and among its members are some of the oldest football clubs in Australia, including the Castlemaine Football Club, who joined in 1925 from the Castlemaine District Football Association and are acknowledged as the second oldest football club in Australia and one of the oldest in the world.

The Bendigo Mid-Week Football Association commenced in 1926 and in 1930 and Railways defeated Banks for the premiership.

- 1926 - Gasworks: 8.17 - 65 d Golden City: 8.11 - 59
- 1928 - School of Mines: 1.12 - 18 d Banks, Stock Agents & Press: 1.7 - 13
- 1930 - Railways: 12.9 81 d Banks: 5.6 - 36

John Ledwidge was captain-coach of the Bendigo Football League representative team that won the 1962 VCFL Caltex Country Football Championships by defeating the Wimmera Football League at Horsham.

In 2024, the Bendigo Football Netball League was reduced from ten football teams to nine, following the departure of the Kyneton Football Club to the Riddell District Football Netball League. In the same year, Broadford Football Club indicated its intention to enter the BNFL from 2025 onwards. In August 2025, Gisborne Football Club voted to leave the league to join the Ballarat Football League for the 2026 season onwards.

== Clubs ==
=== Locations ===
Yellow points represent clubs currently in recess.

Club locations - Bendigo	Club locations - Central Victoria

=== Current ===
Club	Colours	Nickname	Home Ground	Former League	Est.	Joined	BFL Senior Premierships	
Club	Colours	Nickname	Home Ground	Former League	Est.	Joined	Total	Years
Broadford		Kangaroos	Harley Hammond Reserve, Broadford	OEFNL	1890	2024	0	-
Castlemaine		Magpies	Camp Reserve, Castlemaine	CDFL, MFL	1859	1925	4	1926, 1952, 1992, 2000
Eaglehawk		Hawks; Two Blues	Canterbury Park, Eaglehawk	–	1880	1880	27	1882, 1883, 1894, 1895, 1896, 1897, 1998, 1900, 1901, 1903, 1906, 1908, 1922, 1924, 1935, 1941, 1946, 1953, 1957, 1968, 1971, 1980, 1982, 2007, 2008, 2018, 2025
Golden Square		Bulldogs	Wade Street Recreation Reserve, Golden Square	GCFL	1932	1935	18	1938, 1939, 1945, 1964, 1965, 1972, 1975, 1976, 1979, 1988, 1989, 2001, 2009, 2010, 2011, 2012, 2013, 2023
Kangaroo Flat		Kangaroos	Dower Park, Kangaroo Flat	GCFL	1890	1981	1	1996
Marong		Panthers	Malone Park, Marong	GCFL, LVFL	1900s	1981-1982, 2027-	0	-
Sandhurst		Dragons	Queen Elizabeth Oval, Bendigo	–	1861	1880	29	1881, 1884, 1885, 1889, 1890, 1891, 1893, 1920, 1923, 1927, 1929, 1930, 1931, 1932, 1933, 1934, 1937, 1940, 1947, 1948, 1949, 1973, 1977, 1978, 1981, 1983, 2004, 2016, 2024
South Bendigo		Bloods	Harry Trott Oval, Kennington	–	1893	1893	23	1899, 1902, 1904, 1905, 1909, 1910, 1911, 1912, 1914, 1919, 1921, 1925, 1950, 1951, 1954, 1955, 1956, 1969, 1974, 1990, 1991, 1993, 1994
Strathfieldsaye		Storm	Strathfieldsaye Recreation Reserve, Strathfieldsaye	–	2007	2009	4	2014, 2015, 2017, 2019

== Former clubs ==
Club	Colours	Nickname	Home Ground	Former League	Est.	Joined	BFL Senior Premierships		Fate
Club	Colours	Nickname	Home Ground	Former League	Est.	Joined	Total	Years	Fate
Bendigo				–	1862	1880-1893	4	1880, 1886, 1887, 1888, 1892	Folded in 1894
Bendigo City				–	1912	1912-1915	1	1913	Folded in 1915
Bendigo East		Magpies		–	1919	1919-1924	0	-	Moved to Golden City FL in 1925
California Gully				–	1900s	1904-1914	0	-	Moved to Bendigo Second-Rate FA in 1915
Coachbuilders				–	1870s	1880-1886	0	-	Folded in 1887
Echuca	(1924–52)(1953–73)	Murray Bombers	Victoria Park Oval, Echuca	EFL	1874	1924-1941, 1949-1973	3	1928, 1967, 1970	Played in Echuca FL between 1946-48. Moved to Goulburn Valley FL after 1973 season
Echuca East		Hoppers	Echuca East Recreational Reserve, Echuca	EFL	1890s	1940	0	-	Re-formed in Echuca FL in 1946
Elmore			Elmore Recreation Reserve, Elmore	HDFNL	1868	1946	0	-	Moved to Echuca FL after 1946 season
Gisborne		Bulldogs	Gardiner Reserve, Gisborne	RDFNL	1879	2000-2026	6	2002, 2003, 2005, 2006, 2022, 2026	Moved to Ballarat FNL after 2026 season
Kennington-Strathdale (Kennington 1973-77)	(1973-?)(?-1994)	Saints	Harry Trott Oval, Kennington	GCFL	1930s	1973-1994	0	-	Folded in 1994
Kyneton	(1932–59)(1960-2023)	Tigers	Kyneton Showgrounds, Kyneton	CDFL	1868	1932-1940, 1947-2023	6	1936, 1960, 1961, 1966, 1995, 1997	Played in Castlemaine District FL in 1945-46. Moved to Riddell District FNL after 2023 season
Lockington Bamawm United		Cats	Lockington Recreation Reserve, Lockington	NEFL	1990	1997-2000	0	-	Moved to Heathcote District FNL after 2000 season
Long Gully		Alberts, Maroons		–	1900s	1888, 1905-1911	1	1907	Moved to Bendigo Second-Rate FA in 1912
Maryborough		Magpies	Princes Park, Maryborough	BFL	1872	1992-2023	2	1998, 1999	Recess between 2024-26. Re-formed in Maryborough Castlemaine District FNL in 2027
North Ballarat City		Roosters	Eureka Stadium, Wendouree	–	1882	2006-2007	0	-	Moved to Ballarat FL after 2007 season
North Bendigo		Bulldogs	North Bendigo Oval, North Bendigo	GCFL	1887	1887-1897, 1981-1995	0	-	Disbanded in 1898. Moved to Heathcote District FNL in 1996
North Sandhurst				–	1887	1887-1891	0	-	Folded in 1892
Northern United		Swallows	Raywood Recreation Reserve, Raywood	GCFL	1949	1981-1996	4	1984, 1985, 1986, 1987	Folded 1 game into 1996 season. Merged with Calivil to form Calivil United in Loddon Valley FNL in 1997
Provincial		Pros	Weeroona Oval, Bendigo	GCFL	1945	1981-1982	0	-	Moved to Heathcote District FNL after 1982 season
Rochester		Demons	Rochester Recreation Reserve, Rochester	–	1874	1915-1971	4	1958, 1959, 1962, 1963	Recess in 1972, re-formed in Goulburn Valley FL after 1971 season
West Bendigo				–	1900s	1904-1907	0	-	Moved to Bendigo Second-Rate FA in 1908
White Hills		Demons	White Hills Oval, White Hills	GCFL	1924	1981-1983	0	-	Moved to Heathcote District FNL after 1983 season
YCW		Cats	Backhaus Oval, Golden Square	GCFL	1945	1981-1983	0	-	Moved to Loddon Valley FNL after 1983 season, now known as Maiden Gully YCW

== Senior Football Premierships ==
- 1880 Bendigo
- 1881 Sandhurst
- 1882 Eaglehawk
- 1883 Eaglehawk
- 1884 Sandhurst ?
- 1885 Sandhurst
- 1886 Bendigo
- 1887 Bendigo
- 1888 Bendigo
- 1889 Sandhurst*
- 1890 Sandhurst
- 1891 Sandhurst
- 1892 Bendigo
- 1893 Sandhurst
- 1894 Eaglehawk*
- 1895 Eaglehawk
- 1896 Eaglehawk
- 1897 Eaglehawk
- 1898 Eaglehawk
- 1899 South Bendigo
- 1900 Eaglehawk
- 1901 Eaglehawk
- 1902 South Bendigo
- 1903 Eaglehawk
- 1904 South Bendigo
- 1905 South Bendigo
- 1906 Eaglehawk
- 1907 Long Gully
- 1908 Eaglehawk
- 1909 South Bendigo
- 1910 South Bendigo
- 1911 South Bendigo
- 1912 South Bendigo
- 1913 Bendigo City
- 1914 South Bendigo
- 1915 1st: Rochester.Abandoned>July>WW1
- 1916 In recess, WWI
- 1917 In recess, WWI
- 1918 In recess, WWI
- 1919 South Bendigo
- 1920 Sandhurst
- 1921 South Bendigo
- 1922 Eaglehawk
- 1923 Sandhurst
- 1924 Eaglehawk
- 1925 South Bendigo
- 1926 Castlemaine
- 1927 Sandhurst
- 1928 Echuca
- 1929 Sandhurst
- 1930 Sandhurst
- 1931 Sandhurst
- 1932 Sandhurst
- 1933 Sandhurst
- 1934 Sandhurst
- 1935 Eaglehawk
- 1936 Kyneton
- 1937 Sandhurst
- 1938 Golden Square
- 1939 Golden Square
- 1940 Sandhurst
- 1941 Eaglehawk
- 1942 In recess, WW2
- 1943 In recess, WW2
- 1944 In recess, WW2
- 1945 Golden Square
- 1946 Eaglehawk
- 1947 Sandhurst
- 1948 Sandhurst
- 1949 Sandhurst
- 1950 South Bendigo
- 1951 South Bendigo
- 1952 Castlemaine
- 1953 Eaglehawk
- 1954 South Bendigo
- 1955 South Bendigo
- 1956 Sandhurst
- 1957 Eaglehawk
- 1958 Rochester
- 1959 Rochester
- 1960 Kyneton
- 1961 Kyneton
- 1962 Rochester
- 1963 Rochester
- 1964 Golden Square
- 1965 Golden Square
- 1966 Kyneton
- 1967 Echuca
- 1968 Eaglehawk
- 1969 South Bendigo
- 1970 Echuca
- 1971 Eaglehawk
- 1972 Golden Square
- 1973 Sandhurst
- 1974 South Bendigo
- 1975 Golden Square
- 1976 Golden Square
- 1977 Sandhurst
- 1978 Sandhurst
- 1979 Golden Square
- 1980 Golden Square
- 1981 Sandhurst
- 1982 Eaglehawk
- 1983 Sandhurst
- 1984 Northern United
- 1985 Northern United
- 1986 Northern United
- 1987 Northern United
- 1988 Golden Square
- 1989 Golden Square
- 1990 South Bendigo
- 1991 South Bendigo
- 1992 Castlemaine
- 1993 South Bendigo
- 1994 South Bendigo
- 1995 Kyneton
- 1996 Kangaroo Flat
- 1997 Kyneton
- 1998 Maryborough
- 1999 Maryborough
- 2000 Castlemaine
- 2001 Golden Square
- 2002 Gisborne
- 2003 Gisborne
- 2004 Sandhurst
- 2005 Gisborne
- 2006 Gisborne
- 2007 Eaglehawk
- 2008 Eaglehawk
- 2009 Golden Square
- 2010 Golden Square
- 2011 Golden Square
- 2012 Golden Square
- 2013 Golden Square
- 2014 Strathfieldsaye
- 2015 Strathfieldsaye
- 2016 Sandhurst
- 2017 Strathfieldsaye
- 2018 Eaglehawk
- 2019 Strathfieldsaye
- 2020 BFNL in recess > COVID-19
- 2021 BFNL abandoned after Rd.17 COVID-19
- 2022 Gisborne
- 2023 Golden Square
- 2024 Sandhurst
- 2025 Eaglehawk
- 2026 Gisborne

== Grand Finals ==
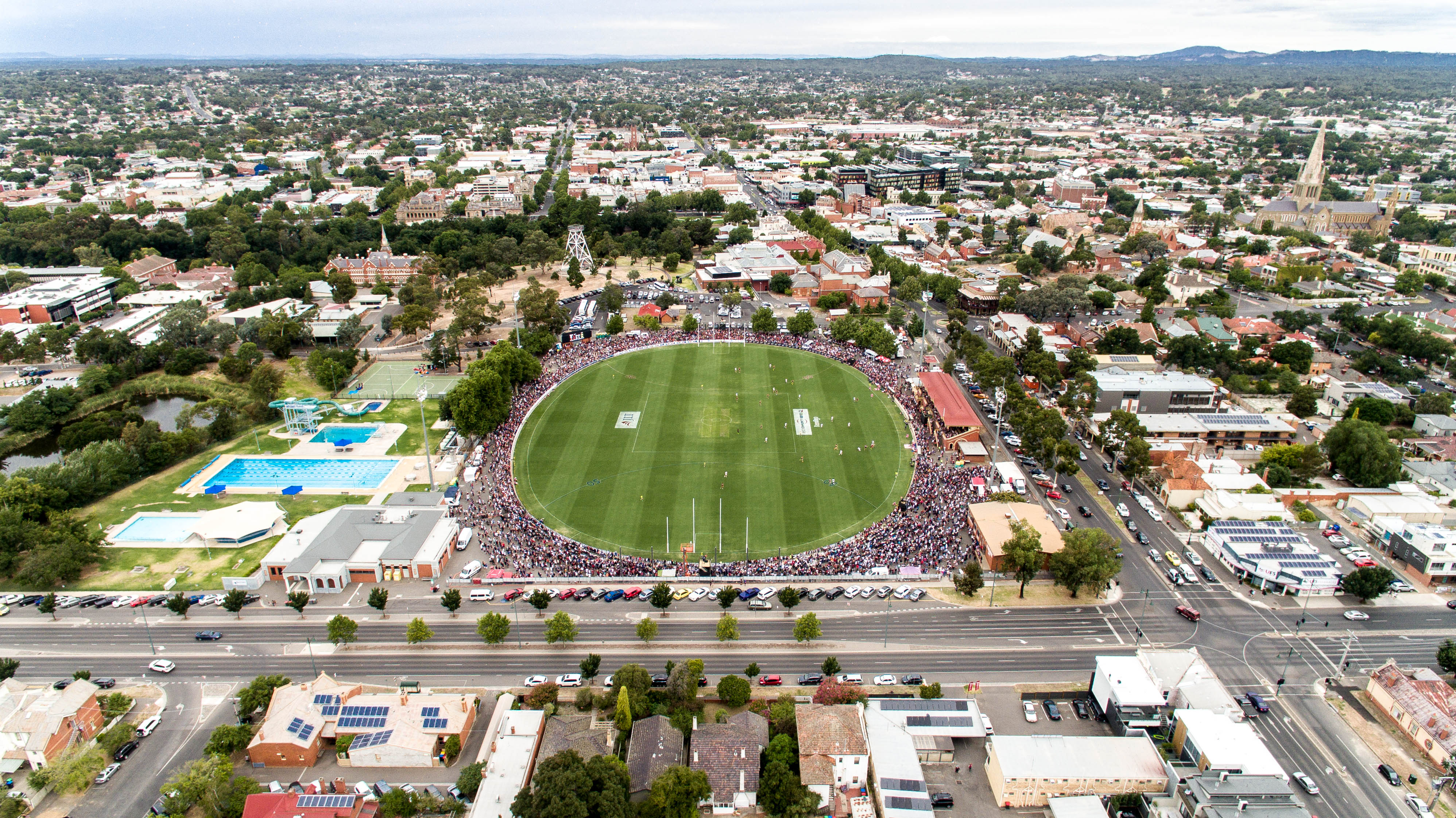
Queen Elizabeth Oval, Bendigo

Senior Football

Between 1880 and 1903, the team on top of the ladder at the end of the home and away series of matches were crowned Premiers, therefore no official Bendigo Football Association Grand Finals were played prior to 1904.

- *1915 - The season was abandoned in late July, 1915 due to World War One. No official premiership was awarded, but Rochester were on top of the ladder.
  *Undefeated premiers

Bendigo Football Association: Grand Final Results
Year	Premiers	Score	Runners up	Score	Best on Ground	Coach	Venue / Comments
1880	1st: Bendigo		2nd: Sandhurst				
1881	1st: Sandhurst		2nd: Bendigo				
1882	Eaglehawk					Charlie Leggo	
1883	Eaglehawk						
1884	Sandhurst	No evidence of	Sandhurst's win?				Could be Coachbuilders FC
1885	Sandhurst						
1886	Bendigo						
1887	1st: Bendigo		2nd: Sandhurst				
1888	1st: Bendigo*		2nd: Sandhurst				Undefeated
1889	1st:Sandhurst*		2nd: Bendigo			Bill Cundy	Undefeated
1890	1st: Sandhurst		2nd: Bendigo			Bill Cundy	
1891	1st: Sandhurst		2nd: North Bendigo				
1892	1st: Bendigo		2nd: Eaglehawk				
1893	1st: Sandhurst		2nd: Eaglehawk			Frank Leaney	
1894	1st: Eaglehawk*		2nd: South Bendigo			E Hummell	Undefeated
1895	1st: Eaglehawk		2nd: South Bendigo			A Tregonning	
1896	1st: Eaglehawk		2nd: South Bendigo			A Tregonning	
1897	1st: Eaglehawk		2nd: South Bendigo			A Tregonning	
1898	1st: Eaglehawk		2nd: South Bendigo				
1899	1st: South Bendigo		2nd: Eaglehawk				
1900	1st: Eaglehawk		2nd: South Bendigo			George Cairns	
1901	1st: Eaglehawk		2nd: South Bendigo			George Cairns	
1902	1st: South Bendigo		2nd: Eaglehawk				
1903	1st: Eaglehawk.		2nd:				
1904	South Bendigo*	4.13 - 37	California Gully	3.5 - 23			Upper Reserve
1905	South Bendigo	3.9 - 27	California Gully	2.5 - 17		E Mills	Upper Reserve
1906	Eaglehawk	8.9 - 57	West Bendigo	1.7 - 13			Canterbury Park
1907	Long Gully	3.3 - 21	Eaglehawk	1.7 - 13			Upper Reserve. Gate:£118
1908	Eaglehawk	7.5 - 47	Long Gully	4.7 - 31			Upper Reserve. £134
1909	South Bendigo	7.9 - 51	Eaglehawk	3.2 - 20		E Mills	Upper Reserve. £130
1910	South Bendigo	5.9 - 39	California Gully	3.10 - 28			Upper Reserve. £84
1911	South Bendigo	7.12 - 54	Eaglehawk	2.6 - 18		L Cook	Upper Reserve. £152
1912	South Bendigo	13.5 - 85	California Gully	3.7 - 25			Upper Reserve
1913	Bendigo City	8.8 - 56	South Bendigo	6.13 - 49			Upper Reserve. £198
Bendigo Football League: Grand Final Results
1914	South Bendigo	5.10 - 40	Eaglehawk	4.6 - 30		L Oliver	Upper Reserve. £110
1915	1st: Rochester*		2nd: Eaglehawk				Abandoned in July > WW1
1916-18							BFA in recess > WW1
1919	South Bendigo	3.7 - 25	Sandhurst	2.12 - 24			Upper Reserve. £280
1920	Sandhurst	6.6 - 42	South Bendigo	4.5 - 29			
1921	South Bendigo	6.15 - 51	Eaglehawk	5.7 - 37			
1922	Eaglehawk	10.16 - 76	Sandhurst	10.11 - 71			Upper Reserve
1923	Sandhurst	10.8 - 68	Rochester	5.15 - 45		Roy Bockholt	Canterbury Park £208
1924	Eaglehawk	14.10 - 101	Rochester	8.9 - 57			Kennington £403
1925	South Bendigo	7.12 - 54	Castlemaine	6.4 - 40		Arthur Hando	Upper Reserve £527
1926	Castlemaine	13.18 - 96	Sandhurst	8.16 - 64	Hunt (C)	Bill Walton	Upper Reserve. £741
1927	Sandhurst	9.11 - 65	Castlemaine	8.14 - 62	W Larkin (S)	Bob McCaskill	£787
1928	Echuca	11.9 - 75	Castlemaine	10.10 - 70		Len Wigraft	£696
1929	Sandhurst	18.11 - 119	South Bendigo	11.10 - 76		Bob McCaskill	
1930	Sandhurst	17.9 - 111	Eaglehawk	9.9 - 63		Bob McCaskill	Gate: £765
1931	Sandhurst	10.14 - 74	South Bendigo	8.14 - 62		Bob McCaskill	
1932	Sandhurst	16.20 - 116	Eaglehawk	7.9 - 51		Bob McCaskill	£347
1933	Sandhurst	29.15 - 189	Maryborough	10.12 - 72		Bob McCaskill	Upper Reserve £589
1934	Sandhurst	11.17 - 83	Castlemaine	8.4 - 52		Bob McCaskill	£369
1935	Eaglehawk	11.15 - 81	Sandhurst	7.17 - 59		Eric Fleming	£416
1936	Kyneton	12.9 - 81	Sandhurst	10.8 - 68		Eric Little	Upper Reserve £579
1937	Sandhurst	16.16 - 112	South Bendigo	6.15 - 51		Bob McCaskill	
1938	Golden Square	21.13 - 139	Eaglehawk	14.7 - 91		Reg Ford	£441
1939	Golden Square	14.8 - 92	Maryborough	12.12 - 84		Reg Ford	
1940	Sandhurst	13.18 - 96	South Bendigo	13.13 - 91		Bob McCaskill	
1941	Eaglehawk	17.10 - 112	South Bendigo	9.14 - 68			
1942-44							BFL in recess > WW2
1945	Golden Square	23.20 - 158	Eaglehawk	8.9 - 57		Bunny Hargreaves	£239
1946	Eaglehawk	14.10 - 94	Golden Square	13.12 - 90		Harold Toma	
1947	Sandhurst	18.19 - 127	Golden Square	11.8 - 74		Reg Ford	
1948	Sandhurst	16.24 - 120	Eaglehawk	8.9 - 57		Reg Ford	
1949	Sandhurst	11.22 - 88	South Bendigo	9.19 - 73		Reg Ford	
1950	South Bendigo	10.12 - 72	Echuca	6.10 - 46		Alan McDonald	Upper Reserve £1065
1951	South Bendigo	24.12 - 156	Eaglehawk	20.8 - 128		Alan McDonald	Upper Reserve £1130
1952	Castlemaine	15.9 - 99	Sandhurst	9.16 - 70		Wally Culpitt	Upper Reserve £2070
1953	Eaglehawk	12.13 - 85	Sandhurst	7.12 - 54		Ollie Grieve	
1954	South Bendigo	11.7 - 73	Sandhurst	9.7 - 61		Alan McDonald	QEO £1690
1955	South Bendigo	10.7 - 67	Sandhurst	9.12 - 66		Alan McDonald	
1956	South Bendigo	10.19 - 79	Eaglehawk	9.15 - 69		Alan McDonald	
1957	Eaglehawk	14.17 - 101	Kyneton	10.11 - 71		Basil Ashman	
1958	Rochester	8.11 - 59	Castlemaine	7.10 - 52		Noel McMahen	
1959	Rochester	15.19 - 109	Kyneton	12.6 - 78		Noel McMahen	
1960	Kyneton	9.8 - 62	Rochester	8.11 - 59		Clive Philp	
1961	Kyneton	12.13 - 85	Rochester	9.6 - 60		Clive Philp	
1962	Rochester	9.17 - 71	Golden Square	7.20 - 62		Con O'Toole	Undefeated Premiers
1963	Rochester	16.22 - 118	Kyneton	10.14 - 74		Con O'Toole	
1964	Golden Square	10.10 - 70	Rochester	9.7 - 61		John Ledwidge	
1965	Golden Square	12.19 - 91	Rochester	11.11 - 77		John Ledwidge	
1966	Kyneton	15.6 - 96	Golden Square	12.12 - 84		Kevin Parks	
1967	Echuca	12.13 - 85	South Bendigo	10.15 - 75		John Knox	
1968	Eaglehawk	8.16 - 64	South Bendigo	8.10 - 58		John Ledwidge	
1969	South Bendigo	10.10 - 70	Eaglehawk	9.13 - 67		Colin Rice	
1970	Echuca	15.13 - 103	Sandhurst	14.13 - 97		Graham Arthur	
1971	Eaglehawk	15.21 - 111	Golden Square	3.10 - 28		John Ledwidge	
1972	Golden Square	14.12 - 96	South Bendigo	11.9 - 74		Bill Bonney	
1973	Sandhurst	14.14 - 98	Golden Square	7.10 - 52		Ron Best	
1974	South Bendigo	17.13 - 115	Sandhurst	14.9 - 93		Bernie McCarthy	
1975	Golden Square	14.13 - 97	Sandhurst	12.14 - 86		Tony Southcombe	
1976	Golden Square	15.13 - 103	Kyneton	9.7 - 61		Tony Southcombe	
1977	Sandhurst	14.10 - 94	Golden Square	9.19 - 73		Ron Best	
1978	Sandhurst	19.10 - 124	Golden Square	18.13 - 121		Peter Crossley	
1979	Golden Square	21.14 - 140	Sandhurst	8.15 - 63		Tony Southcombe	
1980	Eaglehawk mm	17.20 - 122	Golden Square	19.6 - 120			
1981	Sandhurst	16.19 - 115	Castlemaine	6.10 - 46			
1982	Eaglehawk	18.19 - 127	Golden Square	6.12 - 48			
1983	Sandhurst	17.16 - 118	Golden Square	19.9 - 111			
1984	Northern United	18.16 - 124	Eaglehawk	12.10 - 82			
1985	Northern United	19.18 - 132	Sandhurst	14.18 - 102			
1986	Northern United	25.18 - 168	Eaglehawk	11.9 - 75			
1987	Northern United	23.15 - 153	Eaglehawk	14.7 - 91			
1988	Golden Square	10.13 - 73	Nthn United	8.11 - 59			
1989	Golden Square	14.13 - 97	South Bendigo	11.13 - 79			
1990	South Bendigo	15.24 - 114	Golden Square	14.8 - 92			
1991	South Bendigo	14.14 - 98	Castlemaine	10.16 - 76			
1992	Castlemaine	14.13 - 97	Golden Square	14.8 - 92			
1993	South Bendigo	20.22 - 142	Sandhurst	11.11 - 77			
1994	South Bendigo	20.15 - 135	Golden Square	13.9 - 87			
1995	Kyneton	18.13 - 121	South Bendigo	11.10 - 76			
1996	Kangaroo Flat	18.18 - 126	Kyneton	15.20 - 110			
1997	Kyneton	18.15 - 123	Golden Square	7.14 - 56			
1998	Maryborough	19.11 - 125	Sandhurst	12.6 - 78			
1999	Maryborough	20.17 - 137	Castlemaine	17.4 - 106			
2000	Castlemaine	12.11 - 83	Kangaroo Flat	9.17 - 71			
2001	Golden Square	14.11 - 95	Sandhurst	12.9 - 81			
2002	Gisborne	21.13 - 139	Golden Square	7.18 - 60			
2003	Gisborne	18.12 - 120	Eaglehawk	11.7 - 73	Matt Fitzgerald (G)		
2004	Sandhurst	15.14 - 104	Gisborne	10.15 - 75			
2005	Gisborne	14.17 - 101	Eaglehawk	10.10 - 70			
2006	Gisborne	13.11 - 89	Golden Square	9.10 - 64			
2007	Eaglehawk	12.12 - 84	Gisborne	12.10 - 82			
2008	Eaglehawk	14.11 - 95	Golden Square	12.17 - 89			
2009	Golden Square	16.12 - 108	South Bendigo	10.11 - 71			QEO
2010	Golden Square	11.21 - 87	South Bendigo	8.10 - 58			QEO
2011	Golden Square	25.18 - 168	Eaglehawk	5.3 - 33			QEO
2012	Golden Square	16.10 - 106	Gisborne	14.19 - 103			QEO
2013	Golden Square	14.18 - 102	Strathfieldsaye	12.9 - 81			QEO
2014	Strathfieldsaye	20.18 - 138	Sandhurst	12.11 - 83			QEO
2015	Strathfieldsaye	8.12 - 60	Sandhurst	8.5 - 53			QEO
2016	Sandhurst	12.18 - 90	Golden Square	8.10 - 58	Kristian Height (S)		QEO
2017	Strathfieldsaye	13.10 - 88	Eaglehawk	7.14 - 56			QEO
2018	Eaglehawk	19.8 - 122	Strathfieldsaye	11.7 - 73			QEO
2019	Strathfieldsaye	14.10 - 94	Strathfieldsaye	10.20 - 80			QEO
2020							In recess > COVID-19
2021	1st: Strathfieldsaye		2nd: Golden Square				No finals > COVID-19
2022	Gisborne	5.20 - 50	Strathfieldsaye	2.10 - 22			QEO
2023	Golden Square	10.11 - 71	Sandhurst	9.11 - 65			QEO
2024	Sandhurst	10.8 - 68	Gisborne	10.4 - 64	Lachlan Tardrew (S)		QEO
2025	Eaglehawk	14.10 - 94 n	Sandhurst	12.12 - 84	Bailey Ilsley (E)	Clayton Holmes &	QEO
						Travis Matheson	
2026	Gisborne	12.12 - 84	Sandhurst	7.13 - 55	Pat McKenna (G)	Rob Waters	QEO
2027							
Year	Premiers	Score	Runner Up	Score	Best on Ground	Coach	Venue / Comments

== Football: Best & Fairest Award / Goalkicking ==
Seniors

In 1929, the Bendigo Football League (BFL) decided to perpetuate the memory of the late BFL President, Mr. Fred A. Wood, with a gold medal for the best and fairest player from 1930 to 1939.

In 1946, the BFL best and fairest award was named the Arthur E. Cook Medal, in memory of the late Bendigo MLA, who died suddenly at the Victorian Parliament House in April, 1945. For many years, Cook was associated with the administration of the BFL.

Between 1947 and 1951 the award was known as the Thomas Rees Davies Medal, who died in May 1946 and was a former Bendigo Councillor, Eaglehawk Mayor and BFL President from 1935 to 1939. Davies was a former Eaglehawk footballer and club secretary and also Secretary of the BFL too. He was made a life member of the BFL in 1926.

The Jack Michelsen Medal was first awarded in 1952, after a prominent Bendigo Mayor, long-term Councillor and BFL President from 1923 to 1925, John Andrew Michelsen, OBE. Michelsen was a journalist at the Bendigo Advertiser for many years.

Only three players in the history of the Bendigo Football League have won a premiership, won the league best and fairest award and kicked one hundred goals, all in the one season. This achievement was performed by Mickey Crisp in 1930 and Greg Kennedy in 1971, who both went onto play VFL senior football at Carlton the following year in round one. The other is Strathfieldsaye's Lachlan Sharp who achieved this feat in 2017. In 1962, Rochester's Ray Willett won a premiership, won the league best and fairest award and won the league goalkicking with 67 goals.

Most goals in a match

- 24 - David Mahoney: Bendigo City v California Gully, on the Upper Reserve, September 1913.
- 24 - Harry Morgan: Eaglehawk v Rochester, 1953 (Morgan was rested on the bench at three-quarter-time)

Goals in brackets "()" includes goals kicked in finals.

Season	Best & Fairest Medal	Club	Votes	Leading goal-kicker	Club	Goals
1889				Ferguson	Bendigo	10
1893				Joe Mundy	Eaglehawk	35
1894				Joe Mundy	Eaglehawk	43
1912				Richard "Mottle" Daykin	South Bendigo	26
1923				Ike Jones	Eaglehawk	54 (55)
1924				R Scott	South Bendigo	78 (83)
1925				Charlie Nicholls	Castlemaine	58
1926				Percy Forbes	Sandhurst	70 (74)
1927				Bert Smedley	Castlemaine	79 (89)
1928				John Cook	South Bendigo	84 (89)
1929				Frank Ford	Sandhurst	62 (66)
1930	Fred Wood Medal			1st: Frank Crapper	Eaglehawk	98 (108)
	Bill Callaghan	Castlemaine	3	2nd: Mickey Crisp	Sandhurst	(100)
	Mickey Crisp	Sandhurst	3			
	Bruce Jones	South Bendigo	3			
	Norm Le Brun	Sandhurst	3			
	Len Major	Rochester	3			
1931	Alf Firmer	Rochester	4	Roy Moore	Sandhurst	78 (82)
1932	Stan Nicoll	Maryborough	10	1st: Frank Crapper	Eaglehawk	127 (143)
				2nd: Roy Moore	Sandhurst	(132)
1933	Jimmy Davidson	Castlemaine		1st: Frank Crapper	Eaglehawk	154 (165)
				2nd: S. Slater	Maryborough	113
				3rd: Roy Moore	Sandhurst	104
1934	Dave Fraser	Rochester		Roy Moore	Sandhurst	90 (99)
1935	Ern Major	Rochester	5	Mancel Davies	Eaglehawk	82
1936	Bill Spurling	Kyneton		Mancel Davies	Eaglehawk	87 (100)
1937	George Mumford	Golden Square	34	Stan Sinclair	Rochester	82
1938	Frank Halloran	Kyneton	26	Mancel Davies	Eaglehawk	86
1939	Elder Anderson	Kyneton		Jack Hunter	South Bendigo	50 (51)
1940	No award					
1941	No award					
	Arthur Cook Medal					
1946	Bob Dawson	Elmore	30	Fred Hicks	Eaglehawk	57 (77)
	T R Davies Medal					
1947	Herb Zegelin; Ron McHardy; Doug Wilson; Bill White	Rochester; Golden Square; Golden Square; Sandhurst		Vin Kelly	Kyneton	49
1948	Heinz Tonn	Golden Square		Harry Morgan	Eaglehawk	66 (82)
1949	Heinz Tonn	Castlemaine		Ken Connaughton	South Bendigo	60 (74)
1950	Herb Zegelin	Rochester	24	Frank Scholes	Sandhurst	63
1951	Jim Wilson	Golden Square		Harry Morgan	Eaglehawk	78 (92)
	Jack Michelsen Medal					
1952	Kevin Curran	Sandhurst	23	Harry Morgan	Eaglehawk	66
1953	Noel Evans	Sandhurst	23	Harry Morgan	Eaglehawk	107 (113)
1954	Eddie Jackson	Echuca	25	Keith Elliott	Golden Square	76
1955	Jim Byrne	Sandhurst		Ern Parker	Echuca	86 (88)
1956	Frank Fitzpatrick	Rochester	18	Ray McHugh	Sandhurst	71
1957	Frank Fitzpatrick	Rochester	23	John Waddington	South Bendigo	72 (75)
1958	Cliff Deacon	Kyneton		Ray Poulter	Castlemaine	81 (85)
1959	Clive Philp	Kyneton		Ron Ford	Sandhurst	62 (72)
1960	Kevin Parks	Kyneton	19	Clive Philp	Kyneton	75 (82)
1961	Frank Maxwell	Rochester		Merv Hicks	Eaglehawk	64
1962	Ray Willett	Rochester		Ray Willett	Rochester	67 (69)
1963	Bob Vagg	Echuca		Ray Willett	Rochester	53 (58)
1964	Ian Burt	Kyneton	22	Terry Nolen	Sandhurst	87 (88)
1965	Kevin Delmenico; Bill Serong	Castlemaine; Echuca	18	Kevin Shearn	Golden Square	76 (91)
1966	Derek Cowen	Castlemaine	23	Les Kaine	Kyneton	84 (91)
1967	Derek Cowen	Castlemaine	22	Brian Jones	Rochester	68 (70)
1968	Colin Rice	South Bendigo		1st: Bob Morton	South Bendigo	108 (116)
				2nd: Ron Best	Golden Square	106
1969	Brian Walsh	Sandhurst		Ron Best	Golden Square	129 (137)
1970	Kevin Shinners	Rochester		1st: Greg Kennedy	Eaglehawk	105 (125)
				2nd: Ron Best	Golden Square	107
1971	Greg Kennedy	Eaglehawk		1st: Greg Kennedy	Eaglehawk	139 (152)
				2nd: Ron Best	Golden Square	111
1972	Tony Southcombe	Golden Square	33	Keith Raynor; Peter Hutcheson	Eaglehawk; South Bendigo	69; 69 (81)
1973	Bernie McCarthy	South Bendigo	26	Ron Best	Sandhurst	94 (108)
1974	Allan Williams	Eaglehawk	29	Ron Best	Sandhurst	126 (135)
1975	Tony Southcombe	Golden Square		Ron Best	Sandhurst	131 (145)
1976	Bruce Reid	Sandhurst	23	Ron Best	Sandhurst	100 (108)
1977	Graham Clark	Kyneton	17	Peter Woodford	Castlemaine	76
1978	Des English	Eaglehawk		Ron Best	Golden Square	108 (124)
1979	Eric Pascoe; Peter Tyack	Golden Square; South Bendigo		Ron Best	Golden Square	126 (132)
1980	John Watts	Kyneton		Ron Best	Golden Square	145 (161)
1981	Mick Lenaghan	Sandhurst		Wayne Crosbie	Castlemaine	97 (110)
1982	Greg Williams	Golden Square		Daryl Gilmore	Eaglehawk	101 (113)
1983	Greg Williams	Golden Square	22	Ron Best	Northern United	117 (124)
1984	Gary Mountjoy; Marty Graham	Golden Square; South Bendigo	21	Daryl Gilmore	Eaglehawk	111 (122)
1985	Shane Muir	Kyneton		David Collins	Sandhurst	84 (92)
1986	Craig Dowsett	Golden Square	23	Gavin Exell	Northern United	84 (92)
1987	Brendan Hartney	Sandhurst	22	John Jefferies	Castlemaine	73 (83)
1988	Rod Southon	Kennington-Strathdale		Danny Ellis	Sandhurst	78
1989	Brendan Hartney	Sandhurst		Leigh Williams	Golden Square	102 (106)
1990	Damien Saunders	Kangaroo Flat	18	Shawn McCormick	Northern United	79
1991	Derrick Filo	Castlemaine		Daryl Gilmore	Eaglehawk	82 (91)
1992	Simon McLean	Sandhurst		Steven Oliver	Castlemaine	136 (146)
1993	Ron Wicks	Kangaroo Flat	24	Andrew McClellan	North Bendigo	112
1994	Derek Percival	Golden Square	22	Shane McCluskey	Maryborough	100 (113)
1995	Frank Coghlan	Sandhurst	17	David Lancaster	Kangaroo Flat	105 (107)
1996	Jamie Bond	Maryborough	27	Steven Oliver	Castlemaine	84 (90)
1997	Chris Giri; Robin Keck	Kangaroo Flat; South Bendigo	19	David Lancaster	Kangaroo Flat	76
1998	Paul Frew	Golden Square		Steven Reaper	Kyneton	107 (110)
1999	Luke Adams	Castlemaine		Steven Reaper	Kyneton	100 (104)
2000	Reece Langan	Eaglehawk		Steven Oliver	Castlemaine	132 (135)
2001	Paul Eyles; Lucas Matthews	Castlemaine; Eaglehawk		Phil Hetherington	South Bendigo	72 (81)
2002	Matt Aston	Maryborough		Steven Reaper	Gisborne	61 (69)
2003	Matt Fitzgerald	Gisborne		Steven Reaper	Gisborne	86 (102)
2004	Simon Elsum	Gisborne	23	Steven Reaper	Gisborne	75 (80)
2005	Luke Saunders	Gisborne	18	Steven Oliver	Castlemaine	77 (85)
2006	Kain Robins	Eaglehawk	15	Matt O'Toole	Golden Square	82 (87)
2007	Matt Fitzgerald	Gisborne	25	Damien Brown	Eaglehawk	59 (64)
2008	Shannon Milward	Eaglehawk		Jordan Barham	Gisborne	75 (78)
2009	Lee Coghlan	Sandhurst		Justin Maddern	Kangaroo Flat	81 (96)
2010	Josh Bowe	Eaglehawk		Grant Weeks	Golden Square	145 (157)
2011	Wayne Schultz	Castlemaine	22	Grant Weeks	Golden Square	125 (130)
2012	Scott Walsh	Gisborne		Grant Weeks	Golden Square	148 (164)
2013	Tim Martin	Sandhurst		Justin Maddern	South Bendigo	67
2014	Tim Martin	Sandhurst		Stephen Milne	Strathfieldsaye	89 (101)
2015	Brodie Filo	Eaglehawk		Matthew Gretgrix	Eaglehawk	82
2016	Kristan Height	Sandhurst	24	Dylan Johnstone	Golden Square	79 (85)
2017	Lachlan Sharp	Strathfieldsaye		Lachlan Sharp	Strathfieldsaye	124 (142)
2018	Jack Geary	Golden Square		Kaiden Antonowicz	South Bendigo	76
2019	Adam Baird	Golden Square	16	Lachlan Sharp	Strathfieldsaye	129 (133)
2020	Season cancelled due to COVID-19 pandemic in Victoria					
2021	Season abandoned after Rd.17 >	COVID-19>No finals		Lachlan Sharp	Strathfieldsaye	68
2022	Jake Moorhead	Strathfieldsaye	19	Joel Brett	Golden Square	92 (98)
2023	Noah Wheeler	Eaglehawk	24	Lachlan Sharp	Strathfieldsaye	93 (98)
2024	Braidon Blake; Brad Bernacki; Lachlan Tardrew	Gisborne; Gisborne; Sandhurst	20	Fergus Greene	Sandhurst	80 (83)
2025	Billy Evans	Eaglehawk	23	Brock Harvey	South Bendigo	48 (52)
2026	Ben Thompson	Eaglehawk	17	Pat McKenna	Gisborne	78 (94)
2027						

== Season Ladders ==
=== 2000 Ladder ===
Team	Wins	Byes	Losses	Draws	For	Against	%	Pts	Final	Team	G	B	Pts	Team	G	B	Pts
Castlemaine	17	0	1	0	2713	1255	216.18%	68	Elimination	South Bendigo	18	12	120	Gisborne	8	8	56
Kangaroo Flat	16	0	2	0	2273	1341	169.50%	64	Qualifying	Kangaroo Flat	16	11	107	Eaglehawk	13	6	84
Eaglehawk	12	0	6	0	2113	1639	128.92%	48	1st Semi	Eaglehawk	11	12	78	South Bendigo	14	14	98
South Bendigo	11	0	7	0	2003	1421	140.96%	44	2nd Semi	Castlemaine	18	9	117	Kangaroo Flat	16	11	107
Gisborne	10	0	8	0	1828	1836	99.56%	40	Preliminary	Kangaroo Flat	20	14	134	South Bendigo	13	8	86
Maryborough	9	0	9	0	1806	1681	107.44%	36	Grand	Castlemaine	12	11	83	Kangaroo Flat	9	17	71
Sandhurst	8	0	10	0	1860	1653	112.52%	32									
Golden Square	5	0	13	0	1324	2025	65.38%	20									
Kyneton	2	0	16	0	1181	2485	47.53%	8									
Lockington BU	0	0	18	0	883	2654	33.27%	0									

=== 2001 Ladder ===
Team	Wins	Byes	Losses	Draws	For	Against	%	Pts	Final	Team	G	B	Pts	Team	G	B	Pts
Sandhurst	14	2	2	0	1729	1164	148.54%	64	Elimination	Golden Square	15	9	99	Eaglehawk	7	8	50
South Bendigo	11	2	4	1	1729	1160	149.05%	54	Qualifying	Kangaroo Flat	15	19	109	South Bendigo	12	9	81
Kangaroo Flat	11	2	4	1	1576	1402	112.41%	54	1st Semi	Golden Square	10	16	76	South Bendigo	8	5	53
Golden Square	11	2	5	0	1670	1260	132.54%	52	2nd Semi	Sandhurst	16	9	105	Kangaroo Flat	6	11	47
Eaglehawk	8	2	8	0	1594	1505	105.91%	40	Preliminary	Golden Square	11	6	72	Kangaroo Flat	8	11	59
Castlemaine	7	2	9	0	1463	1440	101.60%	36	Grand	Golden Square	14	11	95	Sandhurst	12	9	81
Maryborough	5	2	11	0	1444	1472	98.10%	28									
Gisborne	3	2	13	0	1360	1755	77.49%	20									
Kyneton	1	2	15	0	993	2400	41.38%	12									

=== 2002 Ladder ===
Team	Wins	Byes	Losses	Draws	For	Against	%	Pts	Final	Team	G	B	Pts	Team	G	B	Pts
Gisborne	15	2	1	0	1953	1002	194.91%	68	Elimination	South Bendigo	16	19	115	Maryborough	10	10	70
Sandhurst	11	2	5	0	1408	1243	113.27%	52	Qualifying	Golden Square	23	13	151	Sandhurst	7	12	54
Golden Square	10	2	6	0	1627	1355	120.07%	48	1st Semi	South Bendigo	12	15	87	Sandhurst	11	14	80
South Bendigo	9	2	7	0	1442	1319	109.33%	44	2nd Semi	Gisborne	21	13	139	Golden Square	7	18	60
Maryborough	9	2	7	0	1443	1448	99.65%	44	Preliminary	Golden Square	15	11	101	South Bendigo	14	13	97
Castlemaine	6	2	10	0	1387	1579	87.84%	32	Grand	Gisborne	16	14	110	Golden Square	12	11	83
Eaglehawk	5	2	11	0	1367	1569	87.13%	28									
Kangaroo Flat	5	2	11	0	1138	1703	66.82%	28									
Kyneton	2	2	14	0	1226	1773	69.15%	16									

=== 2003 Ladder ===
Team	Wins	Byes	Losses	Draws	For	Against	%	Pts	Final	Team	G	B	Pts	Team	G	B	Pts
Gisborne	15	2	1	0	2166	1071	202.24%	68	Elimination	Kyneton	10	11	71	Sandhurst	13	22	100
Maryborough	11	2	5	0	1529	1461	104.65%	52	Qualifying	Maryborough	8	5	53	Eaglehawk	10	14	74
Eaglehawk	9	2	7	0	1889	1535	123.06%	44	1st Semi	Maryborough	8	15	63	Sandhurst	10	15	75
Kyneton	9	2	7	0	1668	1507	110.68%	44	2nd Semi	Gisborne	18	9	117	Eaglehawk	13	17	95
Sandhurst	8	2	8	0	1605	1345	119.33%	40	Preliminary	Eaglehawk	22	10	142	Sandhurst	11	13	79
South Bendigo	8	2	8	0	1564	1713	91.30%	40	Grand	Gisborne	18	12	120	Eaglehawk	11	7	73
Golden Square	7	2	9	0	1817	1795	101.23%	36									
Castlemaine	5	2	11	0	1681	1778	94.54%	28									
Kangaroo Flat	0	2	16	0	905	3156	28.68%	8									

=== 2004 Ladder ===
Team	Wins	Byes	Losses	Draws	For	Against	%	Pts	Final	Team	G	B	Pts	Team	G	B	Pts
Gisborne	15	2	1	0	2262	1040	217.50%	68	Elimination	Castlemaine	15	10	100	Maryborough	12	10	82
Sandhurst	14	2	2	0	1830	1134	161.38%	64	Qualifying	Sandhurst	16	13	109	Eaglehawk	13	16	94
Eaglehawk	10	2	6	0	1991	1309	152.10%	48	1st Semi	Eaglehawk	16	17	113	Castlemaine	9	13	67
Castlemaine	10	2	6	0	1723	1629	105.77%	48	2nd Semi	Gisborne	11	10	76	Sandhurst	10	20	80
Maryborough	8	2	8	0	1557	1491	104.43%	40	Preliminary	Gisborne	14	13	97	Eaglehawk	3	14	32
Golden Square	7	2	9	0	1483	1643	90.26%	36	Grand	Sandhurst	15	14	104	Gisborne	10	15	75
South Bendigo	6	2	10	0	1380	1612	85.61%	32									
Kyneton	1	2	15	0	1204	2162	55.69%	12									
Kangaroo Flat	1	2	15	0	1058	2468	42.87%	12									

=== 2005 Ladder ===
Team	Wins	Byes	Losses	Draws	For	Against	%	Pts	Final	Team	G	B	Pts	Team	G	B	Pts
Gisborne	15	2	1	0	2126	1224	173.69%	68	Elimination	Golden Square	17	15	117	South Bendigo	25	12	162
Castlemaine	13	2	3	0	2045	1384	147.76%	60	Qualifying	Castlemaine	15	11	101	Eaglehawk	18	10	118
Eaglehawk	11	2	5	0	1754	1511	116.08%	52	1st Semi	South Bendigo	14	20	104	Castlemaine	11	11	77
Golden Square	10	2	6	0	1797	1560	115.19%	48	2nd Semi	Gisborne	30	14	194	Eaglehawk	10	6	66
South Bendigo	8	2	8	0	1682	1465	114.81%	40	Preliminary	Eaglehawk	13	16	94	South Bendigo	10	8	68
Kyneton	6	2	10	0	1351	1610	83.91%	32	Grand	Gisborne	14	17	101	Eaglehawk	10	10	70
Sandhurst	5	2	11	0	1272	1727	73.65%	28									
Maryborough	3	2	13	0	1129	1962	57.54%	20									
Kangaroo Flat	1	2	15	0	1441	2154	66.90%	12									

=== 2006 Ladder ===
Team	Wins	Byes	Losses	Draws	For	Against	%	Pts	Final	Team	G	B	Pts	Team	G	B	Pts
Gisborne	16	0	2	0	2806	1086	258.38%	64	Elimination	Sandhurst	15	14	104	Eaglehawk	12	14	86
South Bendigo	15	0	3	0	2312	1396	165.62%	60	Qualifying	Golden Square	19	22	136	South Bendigo	16	14	110
Golden Square	14	0	4	0	2631	1655	158.97%	56	1st Semi	South Bendigo	19	20	134	Sandhurst	10	14	74
Eaglehawk	13	0	5	0	2221	1471	150.99%	52	2nd Semi	Golden Square	13	10	88	Gisborne	10	14	74
Sandhurst	10	0	7	1	1996	1841	108.42%	42	Preliminary	Gisborne	27	21	183	South Bendigo	9	9	63
Castlemaine	7	0	11	0	1911	2017	94.74%	28	Grand	Gisborne	13	11	89	Golden Square	10	10	70
Maryborough	6	0	12	0	1473	2135	68.99%	24									
Kyneton	5	0	12	1	1610	2449	65.74%	22									
Kangaroo Flat	3	0	15	0	1437	2549	56.38%	12									
North Ballarat City	0	0	18	0	1197	2995	39.97%	0									

=== 2007 Ladder ===
Team	Wins	Byes	Losses	Draws	For	Against	%	Pts	Final	Team	G	B	Pts	Team	G	B	Pts
Gisborne	17	0	1	0	2296	1002	229.14%	68	Elimination	South Bendigo	13	13	91	Golden Square	10	13	73
Eaglehawk	14	0	4	0	1921	1365	140.73%	56	Qualifying	Eaglehawk	23	14	152	Sandhurst	5	8	38
Sandhurst	13	0	5	0	1947	1399	139.17%	52	1st Semi	South Bendigo	13	12	90	Sandhurst	6	4	40
Golden Square	12	0	6	0	1860	1326	140.27%	48	2nd Semi	Eaglehawk	20	8	128	Gisborne	18	13	121
South Bendigo	12	0	6	0	1780	1354	131.46%	48	Preliminary	Gisborne	14	16	100	South Bendigo	5	11	41
Castlemaine	9	0	9	0	1562	1640	95.24%	36	Grand	Eaglehawk	12	12	84	Gisborne	12	10	82
Maryborough	5	0	13	0	1221	1635	74.68%	20									
North Ballarat City	5	0	13	0	1169	1921	60.85%	20									
Kyneton	3	0	15	0	1271	1930	65.85%	12									
Kangaroo Flat	0	0	18	0	882	2337	37.74%	0									

=== 2008 Ladder ===
Team	Wins	Byes	Losses	Draws	For	Against	%	Pts	Final	Team	G	B	Pts	Team	G	B	Pts
Eaglehawk	14	2	2	0	2206	1265	174.39%	64	Elimination	Golden Square	17	18	120	Maryborough	7	10	52
Gisborne	13	2	3	0	2238	1074	208.38%	60	Qualifying	Gisborne	6	16	52	South Bendigo	3	6	24
South Bendigo	13	2	3	0	2051	1051	195.15%	60	1st Semi	Golden Square	20	14	134	South Bendigo	15	15	105
Golden Square	11	2	5	0	1891	1149	164.58%	52	2nd Semi	Eaglehawk	17	17	119	Gisborne	14	11	95
Maryborough	7	2	9	0	1490	1533	97.20%	36	Preliminary	Golden Square	16	11	107	Gisborne	11	16	82
Kangaroo Flat	7	2	9	0	1440	1737	82.90%	36	Grand	Eaglehawk	14	11	95	Golden Square	12	17	89
Castlemaine	5	2	11	0	1308	1641	79.71%	28									
Sandhurst	1	2	15	0	699	2193	31.87%	12									
Kyneton	1	2	15	0	764	2444	31.26%	12									

=== 2009 Ladder ===
Team	Wins	Byes	Losses	Draws	For	Against	%	Pts	Final	Team	G	B	Pts	Team	G	B	Pts
South Bendigo	16	0	2	0	2252	1115	201.97%	64	Elimination	Kangaroo Flat	19	17	131	Eaglehawk	9	12	66
Golden Square	16	0	2	0	2459	1306	188.28%	64	Qualifying	Golden Square	19	21	135	Gisborne	3	9	27
Gisborne	12	0	6	0	1767	1458	121.19%	48	1st Semi	Kangaroo Flat	17	12	114	Gisborne	7	15	57
Kangaroo Flat	11	0	7	0	1667	1661	100.36%	44	2nd Semi	Golden Square	21	10	136	South Bendigo	15	5	95
Eaglehawk	10	0	8	0	1883	1732	108.72%	40	Preliminary	South Bendigo	16	11	107	Kangaroo Flat	10	15	75
Sandhurst	9	0	9	0	1579	1520	103.88%	36	Grand	Golden Square	16	12	108	South Bendigo	10	11	71
Maryborough	6	0	12	0	1426	1623	87.86%	24									
Castlemaine	5	0	13	0	1653	2032	81.35%	20									
Strathfieldsaye	4	0	14	0	1454	2089	69.60%	16									
Kyneton	1	0	17	0	1049	2651	39.57%	4									

=== 2010 Ladder ===
Team	Wins	Byes	Losses	Draws	For	Against	%	Pts	Final	Team	G	B	Pts	Team	G	B	Pts
Golden Square	17	0	1	0	2559	1079	237.16%	68	Elimination	Maryborough	13	12	90	Sandhurst	11	9	75
South Bendigo	17	0	1	0	2322	1034	224.56%	68	Qualifying	Eaglehawk	18	13	121	South Bendigo	13	5	83
Eaglehawk	14	0	4	0	2128	1378	154.43%	56	1st Semi	South Bendigo	23	6	144	Maryborough	11	7	73
Sandhurst	10	0	8	0	1748	1536	113.80%	40	2nd Semi	Golden Square	20	11	131	Eaglehawk	13	9	87
Maryborough	9	0	9	0	1639	1565	104.73%	36	Preliminary	South Bendigo	17	8	110	Eaglehawk	7	12	54
Kangaroo Flat	9	0	9	0	1830	2071	88.36%	36	Grand	Golden Square	11	21	87	South Bendigo	8	10	58
Strathfieldsaye	6	0	12	0	1643	2226	73.81%	24									
Gisborne	4	0	14	0	1462	2173	67.28%	16									
Kyneton	4	0	14	0	1364	2333	58.47%	16									
Castlemaine	0	0	18	0	1207	2507	48.15%	0									

=== 2011 Ladder ===
Team	Wins	Byes	Losses	Draws	For	Against	%	Pts	Final	Team	G	B	Pts	Team	G	B	Pts
Golden Square	18	0	0	0	2609	976	267.32%	72	Elimination	Sandhurst	19	19	133	South Bendigo	12	11	83
Eaglehawk	13	0	5	0	2037	1525	133.57%	52	Qualifying	Eaglehawk	16	16	112	Gisborne	13	10	88
Gisborne	12	0	6	0	2212	1547	142.99%	48	1st Semi	Gisborne	17	14	116	Sandhurst	9	7	61
Sandhurst	11	0	7	0	1918	1469	130.57%	44	2nd Semi	Golden Square	10	13	73	Eaglehawk	3	12	30
South Bendigo	11	0	7	0	1935	1647	117.49%	44	Preliminary	Eaglehawk	17	7	109	Gisborne	14	19	103
Strathfieldsaye	9	0	9	0	1807	1456	124.11%	36	Grand	Golden Square	25	18	168	Eaglehawk	5	3	33
Maryborough	9	0	9	0	1514	1851	81.79%	36									
Kangaroo Flat	5	0	13	0	1608	1895	84.85%	20									
Castlemaine	2	0	16	0	1232	2204	55.90%	8									
Kyneton	0	0	18	0	871	3173	27.45%	0									

=== 2012 Ladder ===
Team	Wins	Byes	Losses	Draws	For	Against	%	Pts	Final	Team	G	B	Pts	Team	G	B	Pts
Gisborne	15	0	2	1	2216	1199	184.82%	62	Elimination	Strathfieldsaye	15	13	103	South Bendigo	9	6	60
Golden Square	14	0	3	1	2094	1355	154.54%	58	Qualifying	Golden Square	13	12	90	Sandhurst	10	17	77
Sandhurst	13	0	4	1	1761	1342	131.22%	54	1st Semi	Strathfieldsaye	19	15	129	Sandhurst	13	12	90
Strathfieldsaye	12	0	6	0	1986	1490	133.29%	48	2nd Semi	Golden Square	17	15	117	Gisborne	12	9	81
South Bendigo	11	0	7	0	1696	1280	132.50%	44	Preliminary	Gisborne	16	10	106	Strathfieldsaye	13	9	87
Eaglehawk	8	0	10	0	1343	1693	79.33%	32	Grand	Golden Square	16	10	106	Gisborne	15	13	103
Kangaroo Flat	7	0	11	0	1738	1807	96.18%	28									
Maryborough	5	0	13	0	1180	1622	72.75%	20									
Kyneton	2	0	16	0	1073	2323	46.19%	8									
Castlemaine	1	0	16	1	1075	2051	52.41%	6									

=== 2013 Ladder ===
Team	Wins	Byes	Losses	Draws	For	Against	%	Pts	Final	Team	G	B	Pts	Team	G	B	Pts
Strathfieldsaye	12	0	3	1	1645	1020	161.27%	50	Elimination	Gisborne	17	12	114	Sandhurst	10	13	73
Eaglehawk	11	0	5	0	1486	1112	133.63%	44	Qualifying	Golden Square	10	9	69	Eaglehawk	8	17	65
Golden Square	11	0	5	0	1346	1033	130.30%	44	1st Semi	Eaglehawk	18	14	122	Gisborne	8	10	58
Sandhurst	10	0	6	0	1583	999	158.46%	40	2nd Semi	Golden Square	13	14	92	Strathfieldsaye	12	12	84
Gisborne	10	0	6	0	1499	1238	121.08%	40	Preliminary	Strathfieldsaye	14	14	98	Eaglehawk	11	13	79
South Bendigo	9	0	6	1	1255	1272	98.66%	38	Grand	Golden Square	14	18	102	Strathfieldsaye	12	9	81
Castlemaine	3	0	13	0	1003	1668	60.13%	12									
Maryborough	3	0	13	0	1008	1750	57.60%	12									
Kangaroo Flat	2	0	14	0	1063	1796	59.19%	8									

=== 2014 Ladder ===
Team	Wins	Byes	Losses	Draws	For	Against	%	Pts	Final	Team	G	B	Pts	Team	G	B	Pts
Strathfieldsaye	17	0	1	0	2174	995	218.49%	68	Elimination	Golden Square	17	18	120	Eaglehawk	14	11	95
Sandhurst	16	0	2	0	2095	1053	198.96%	64	Qualifying	Sandhurst	15	18	108	Gisborne	10	6	66
Gisborne	13	0	5	0	1894	1295	146.25%	52	1st Semi	Gisborne	11	11	77	Golden Square	10	13	73
Golden Square	10	0	8	0	1695	1411	120.13%	40	2nd Semi	Strathfieldsaye	17	11	113	Sandhurst	10	11	71
Eaglehawk	9	0	9	0	1505	1428	105.39%	36	Preliminary	Sandhurst	13	14	92	Gisborne	13	9	87
Kangaroo Flat	9	0	9	0	1499	1777	84.36%	36	Grand	Strathfieldsaye	20	18	138	Sandhurst	12	11	83
Kyneton	6	0	12	0	1491	1978	75.38%	24									
Maryborough	4	0	13	0	1221	1792	68.14%	16									
Castlemaine	3	0	15	0	1095	2141	51.14%	12									
South Bendigo	2	0	15	0	1000	1799	55.59%	8									

=== 2015 Ladder ===
Team	Wins	Byes	Losses	Draws	For	Against	%	Pts	Final	Team	G	B	Pts	Team	G	B	Pts
Strathfieldsaye	18	0	0	0	2081	938	221.86%	72	Elimination	Eaglehawk	12	17	89	Kyneton	9	9	63
Golden Square	16	0	2	0	2083	1050	198.38%	64	Qualifying	Golden Square	14	14	98	Sandhurst	12	8	80
Sandhurst	14	0	4	0	2088	1132	184.45%	56	1st Semi	Sandhurst	15	17	107	Eaglehawk	8	12	60
Eaglehawk	12	0	6	0	1946	1199	162.30%	48	2nd Semi	Strathfieldsaye	15	13	103	Golden Square	9	8	62
Kyneton	8	0	10	0	1730	1957	88.40%	32	Preliminary	Sandhurst	15	14	104	Golden Square	3	9	27
Gisborne	6	0	12	0	1392	1684	82.66%	24	Grand	Strathfieldsaye	8	12	60	Sandhurst	8	5	53
Castlemaine	6	0	12	0	1349	1664	81.07%	24									
Kangaroo Flat	6	0	12	0	1294	1932	66.98%	24									
South Bendigo	4	0	14	0	1186	1582	74.97%	16									
Maryborough	0	0	18	0	890	2901	30.68%	0									

=== 2016 Ladder ===
Team	Wins	Byes	Losses	Draws	For	Against	%	Pts	Final	Team	G	B	Pts	Team	G	B	Pts
Sandhurst	16	0	2	0	2169	1039	208.76%	64	Elimination	Eaglehawk	20	9	129	Kyneton	11	8	74
Golden Square	15	0	3	0	2212	1060	208.68%	60	Qualifying	Golden Square	15	8	98	Strathfieldsaye	6	8	44
Strathfieldsaye	14	0	4	0	1715	1034	165.86%	56	1st Semi	Eaglehawk	9	15	69	Strathfieldsaye	9	9	63
Eaglehawk	10	0	8	0	1743	1275	136.71%	40	2nd Semi	Sandhurst	13	8	86	Golden Square	4	9	33
Kyneton	10	0	8	0	1770	1579	112.10%	40	Preliminary	Golden Square	11	13	79	Eaglehawk	9	6	60
Kangaroo Flat	10	0	8	0	1574	1459	107.88%	40	Grand	Sandhurst	12	18	90	Golden Square	8	10	58
Castlemaine	7	0	11	0	1552	1776	87.39%	28									
South Bendigo	5	0	13	0	1264	1549	81.60%	20									
Gisborne	3	0	15	0	1074	2084	51.54%	12									
Maryborough	0	0	18	0	855	3073	27.82%	0									

=== 2017 Ladder ===
Team	Wins	Byes	Losses	Draws	For	Against	%	Pts	Final	Team	G	B	Pts	Team	G	B	Pts
Eaglehawk	16	0	2	0	2062	1186	173.86%	64	Elimination	Sandhurst	12	18	90	Kyneton	13	7	85
Strathfieldsaye	15	0	3	0	2267	1039	218.19%	60	Qualifying	Strathfieldsaye	9	19	73	Golden Square	10	4	64
Golden Square	14	0	3	1	1854	1065	174.08%	58	1st Semi	Golden Square	7	13	55	Sandhurst	6	15	51
Sandhurst	11	0	6	1	1861	1215	153.17%	46	2nd Semi	Eaglehawk	14	13	97	Strathfieldsaye	14	10	94
Kyneton	10	0	6	2	1950	1488	131.05%	44	Preliminary	Strathfieldsaye	10	17	77	Golden Square	9	7	61
South Bendigo	9	0	9	0	1685	1464	115.10%	36	Grand	Strathfieldsaye	13	10	88	Eaglehawk	7	14	56
Gisborne	6	0	12	0	1520	1743	87.21%	24									
Kangaroo Flat	4	0	14	0	1178	1901	61.97%	16									
Castlemaine	2	0	16	0	943	2508	37.60%	8									
Maryborough	1	0	17	0	899	2610	34.44%	4									

=== 2018 Ladder ===
Team	Wins	Byes	Losses	Draws	For	Against	%	Pts	Final	Team	G	B	Pts	Team	G	B	Pts
Strathfieldsaye	16	0	2	0	2198	974	225.67%	64	Elimination	Sandhurst	13	10	88	Gisborne	9	11	65
Eaglehawk	15	0	3	0	2038	1093	186.46%	60	Qualifying	Eaglehawk	22	17	149	Kyneton	5	7	37
Kyneton	12	0	5	1	1809	1295	139.69%	50	1st Semi	Sandhurst	24	9	153	Kyneton	6	13	49
Sandhurst	12	0	6	0	1791	934	191.76%	48	2nd Semi	Eaglehawk	16	9	105	Strathfieldsaye	9	11	65
Gisborne	11	0	7	0	1745	1291	135.17%	44	Preliminary	Strathfieldsaye	13	14	92	Sandhurst	9	9	63
Golden Square	10	0	8	0	1681	1187	141.62%	40	Grand	Eaglehawk	19	8	122	Strathfieldsaye	11	7	73
South Bendigo	7	0	10	1	1454	1609	90.37%	30									
Kangaroo Flat	4	0	14	0	1072	2055	52.17%	16									
Maryborough	1	0	17	0	978	2173	45.01%	4									
Castlemaine	1	0	17	0	678	2833	23.93%	4									

=== 2019 Ladder ===
Team	Wins	Byes	Losses	Draws	For	Against	%	Pts	Final	Team	G	B	Pts	Team	G	B	Pts
Strathfieldsaye	17	0	1	0	2646	846	312.77%	68	Elimination	Golden Square	11	11	77	Sandhurst	10	2	62
Eaglehawk	15	0	3	0	2134	1043	204.6%	60	Qualifying	Eaglehawk	13	11	89	Gisborne	7	9	51
Gisborne	14	0	4	0	2033	1016	200.1%	56	1st Semi	Gisborne	16	10	106	Golden Square	5	13	43
Golden Square	12	0	6	0	1711	1050	162.95%	48	2nd Semi	Strathfieldsaye	14	16	100	Eaglehawk	3	10	28
Sandhurst	12	0	6	0	1570	1193	131.6%	48	Preliminary	Eaglehawk	12	7	79	Gisborne	11	9	75
Maryborough	6	0	12	0	1261	2064	61.09%	24	Grand	Strathfieldsaye	14	10	94	Eaglehawk	10	20	80
South Bendigo	5	0	13	0	1411	1821	77.48%	20									
Kyneton	5	0	13	0	1069	1819	58.77%	20									
Kangaroo Flat	4	0	14	0	973	2073	46.94%	16									
Castlemaine	0	0	18	0	626	2509	24.95%	0									

=== 2020 Ladder ===
Team	Wins	Byes	Losses	Draws	For	Against	%	Pts
Castlemaine
Eaglehawk
Gisborne
Golden Square
Kangaroo Flat	Season cancelled due to COVID-19 pandemic in Victoria							
Kyneton
Maryborough
Sandhurst
South Bendigo
Strathfieldsaye

=== 2021 Ladder ===
Home & Away Season was reduced by 6 rounds and Finals series cancelled due to COVID-19 pandemic in Victoria

Team	Wins	Byes	Losses	Draws	For	Against	%	Pts
Strathfieldsaye	10	0	2	0	1469	634	231.7%	40
Golden Square	10	0	2	0	1433	769	186.35%	40
Sandhurst	10	0	2	0	1297	757	171.33%	40
Gisborne	9	0	3	0	1442	701	205.71%	36
South Bendigo	9	0	3	0	1306	823	158.69%	36
Eaglehawk	6	0	6	0	1319	776	169.97%	24
Kyneton	3	0	9	0	853	1267	67.32%	12
Kangaroo Flat	2	0	10	0	599	1434	41.77%	8
Maryborough	1	0	11	0	648	1529	42.38%	4
Castlemaine	0	0	12	0	335	2024	16.55%	0

=== 2022 Ladder ===
Team	Wins	Byes	Losses	Draws	For	Against	%	Pts	Final	Team	G	B	Pts	Team	G	B	Pts
Gisborne	16	0	2	0	2221	839	264.72%	64	Elimination	South Bendigo	17	12	114	Sandhurst	9	11	65
Golden Square	14	0	4	0	2216	903	245.4%	56	Qualifying	Strathfieldsaye	15	8	98	Golden Square	7	18	60
Strathfieldsaye	14	0	4	0	1966	1058	185.82%	56	1st Semi	Golden Square	10	22	82	South Bendigo	6	7	43
South Bendigo	11	0	7	0	1591	1458	109.12%	44	2nd Semi	Strathfieldsaye	12	11	83	Gisborne	10	11	71
Sandhurst	10	0	8	0	1785	1286	138.8%	40	Preliminary	Gisborne	8	9	57	Golden Square	7	13	55
Kyneton	10	0	8	0	1691	1373	123.16%	40	Grand	Gisborne	5	20	50	Strathfieldsaye	2	10	22
Eaglehawk	9	0	9	0	1488	1357	109.65%	36									
Kangaroo Flat	4	0	14	0	1012	2094	48.33%	16									
Castlemaine	2	0	16	0	758	2387	31.76%	8									
Maryborough	0	0	18	0	671	2644	25.38%	0									

=== 2023 Ladder ===
Team	Wins	Byes	Losses	Draws	For	Against	%	Pts	Final	Team	G	B	Pts	Team	G	B	Pts
Sandhurst	16	0	1	1	1790	777	230.37%	66	Elimination	Eaglehawk	14	20	104	South Bendigo	10	11	71
Golden Square	16	0	2	0	2240	917	244.27%	64	Qualifying	Golden Square	12	15	87	Strathfieldsaye	8	13	61
Strathfieldsaye	12	0	6	0	1982	1246	159.07%	48	1st Semi	Strathfieldsaye	13	14	92	Eaglehawk	8	9	57
Eaglehawk	11	0	6	1	1713	933	183.6%	46	2nd Semi	Golden Square	13	10	88	Sandhurst	11	8	74
South Bendigo	10	0	8	0	1772	1375	128.87%	40	Preliminary	Sandhurst	11	15	81	Strathfieldsaye	11	7	73
Kyneton	9	0	9	0	1296	1594	81.3%	36	Grand	Golden Square	10	11	71	Sandhurst	9	11	65
Gisborne	8	0	10	0	1767	1288	137.19%	32									
Kangaroo Flat	5	0	13	0	1055	1858	56.78%	20									
Castlemaine	2	0	16	0	810	1943	41.69%	8									
Maryborough	0	0	18	0	550	2952	18.63%	0									

=== 2024 Ladder ===
Team	Wins	Byes	Losses	Draws	For	Against	%	Pts	Final	Team	G	B	Pts	Team	G	B	Pts
Sandhurst	14	2	2	0	2132	744	286.56%	56	Elimination	Golden Square	12	10	82	Eaglehawk	6	15	51
Gisborne	14	2	2	0	2047	907	225.69%	56	Qualifying	Gisborne	18	17	125	Strathfieldsaye	10	10	70
Strathfieldsaye	11	2	5	0	1596	977	163.36%	44	1st Semi	Strathfieldsaye	10	18	78	Golden Square	10	10	70
Golden Square	10	2	6	0	1523	953	159.81%	40	2nd Semi	Gisborne	13	11	89	Sandhurst	9	12	66
Eaglehawk	9	2	7	0	1405	1003	140.08%	36	Preliminary	Sandhurst	8	16	64	Strathfieldsaye	7	12	54
Castlemaine	7	2	9	0	1276	1233	103.49%	28	Grand	Sandhurst	10	8	68	Gisborne	10	4	64
South Bendigo	4	2	12	0	1254	1828	68.60%	16									
Kangaroo Flat	3	2	13	0	1001	1995	50.18%	12									
Maryborough	0	2	16	0	435	3029	14.36%	0									

=== 2025 Ladder ===
Team	Wins	Byes	Losses	Draws	For	Against	%	Pts	Final	Team	G	B	Pts	Team	G	B	Pts
Sandhurst	14	0	2	0	1797	775	231.87%	56	Elimination	South Bendigo	11	9	75	Strathfieldsaye	8	17	65
Eaglehawk	12	0	4	0	1413	812	174.01%	48	Qualifying	Eaglehawk	9	11	65	Gisborne	8	8	56
Gisborne	12	0	4	0	1460	1156	126.30%	48	1st Semi	Gisborne	14	9	93	South Bendigo	8	13	61
South Bendigo	11	0	5	0	1562	1135	137.62%	44	2nd Semi	Sandhurst	14	11	95	Eaglehawk	4	10	34
Strathfieldsaye	7	0	9	0	987	1079	91.47%	28	Preliminary	Eaglehawk	12	13	85	Gisborne	7	10	52
Golden Square	5	0	11	0	975	1302	74.88%	20	Grand	Eaglehawk	14	10	94	Sandhurst	12	12	84
Castlemaine	3	0	13	0	1029	1406	73.19%	12									
Kangaroo Flat	0	0	16	0	654	2212	29.57%	0									

=== 2026 Ladder ===
Team	Wins	Byes	Losses	Draws	For	Against	%	Pts	Final	Team	G	B	Pts	Team	G	B	Pts
Sandhurst	14	2	2	0	1694	859	197.21%	56	Elimination	Gisborne	16	9	105	South Bendigo	7	11	53
Strathfieldsaye	12	2	4	0	1710	1053	162.39%	48	Qualifying	Eaglehawk	18	10	118	Strathfieldsaye	12	17	89
Eaglehawk	11	2	5	0	1933	987	195.85%	44	1st Semi	Gisborne	16	11	107	Strathfieldsaye	10	9	69
Gisborne	11	2	5	0	1934	1069	180.92%	44	2nd Semi	Sandhurst	11	13	79	Eaglehawk	11	9	75
South Bendigo	11	2	5	0	1721	1168	147.35%	44	Preliminary	Gisborne	9	17	71	Eaglehawk	7	9	51
Castlemaine	6	2	10	0	1418	1337	106.06%	24	Grand	Gisborne	12	12	84	Sandhurst	7	13	55
Golden Square	4	2	12	0	1264	1306	96.78%	16									
Kangaroo Flat	3	2	13	0	1030	1774	58.06%	12									
Broadford	0	2	16	0	340	3491	9.74%	0									
