= Roy Moore (Australian footballer) =

Australian rules footballer (1914–1973)

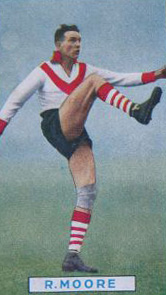

Personal information
- Full name: Roy R. Moore
- Born: 22 December 1914
- Died: 4 June 1973 (aged 58)
- Original team: Sandhurst
- Height: 183 cm (6 ft 0 in)
- Weight: 80 kg (176 lb)
- Position: Forward

Playing career^{1}
Years	Club	Games (Goals)
1931–34,	Sandhurst	? (415)
1935–39, 1941	South Melbourne	66 (144)
- ^{1} Playing statistics correct to the end of 1941.

Career highlights
- 1931, 1932, 1933 & 1934 - BFL Premiership: Sandhurst; 1931 - Leading BFL goalkicker: 82 goals; 1932 - 132 goals (2nd); 1933 - 104 goals (3rd); 1934 - Leading BFL goalkicker: 99 goals

Roy Moore (22 December 1914 – 4 June 1973) was an Australian rules footballer who played with South Melbourne in the Victorian Football League (VFL) during the 1930s. His father Herbert Moore played one game for South Melbourne in their premiership year of 1909.

Moore was signed up by South Melbourne in 1932 and recruited from Sandhurst in the Bendigo Football League, where he became a prolific young goalkicker. Moore kicked a total of 415 goals for Sandhurst, over the following years -

- 1931: 78 (82)
- 1932: 132
- 1933: 104 and
- 1934: 90 (99). () brackets includes goals kicked in the finals.

Moore played in four consecutive Bendigo Football League premierships with Sandhurst in 1931, 1932, 1933 and 1934 and in Sandhurst's 1932 grand final win, Moore kicked nine goals and was Sandhurst's best player.

Moore, a forward who liked the torpedo punt, kicked 52 goals in his debut VFL season, 1935. Two of those came in South Melbourne's losing 1935 VFL Grand Final team, where he replaced the injured Bob Pratt at full-forward, and he also kicked two goals in another losing Grand Final the following season.

Late in the 1937 season, against Fitzroy at Lake Oval, Moore bagged a career-best nine goals despite the entire South Melbourne team managing just ten in the entire game; as of 2022, this remains a joint league record for the highest percentage of a team's goals in a single match (with a minimum qualifying total of least 8 goals); only Collingwood's Dick Lee has kicked that many goals in a game where only one other kicked a major score, sharing the record. A leg injury restricted his appearances towards the end of his career, but Moore managed to finish as his club's top goal-kicker in 1938 with 34 goals. He represented the VFL on one occasion, in a game against the VFA.

Moore was appointed as the captain-coach of Terang Football Club in the Hampden Football League in 1939, but was not cleared by South Melbourne.

Moore aggravated his right knee in a practice match in April, 1940 and was later advised to take 12 months off from Australian Rules football in May 1940. Moore later retired in 1941 after consulting with his doctor due to knee issues.
