= Bob Morton (Australian footballer) =

Australian rules footballer

Personal information
- Full name: Robert M. Morton
- Born: 9 March 1944
- Died: 21 March 1995 (aged 51)
- Original team: Hampton Scouts
- Height: 189 cm (6 ft 2 in)
- Weight: 89 kg (196 lb)
- Position: Forward

Playing career^{1}
Years	Club	Games (Goals)
1962–1965	St Kilda	42 (58)
- ^{1} Playing statistics correct to the end of 1965.

Robert "Bob" Morton (9 March 1944 – 21 March 1995) was an Australian rules footballer who played with St Kilda in the Victorian Football League (VFL).

Morton, who came from the Hampton Scouts, played his football as a forward. He kicked 21 goals from 13 games in 1964 and during this time also played district cricket for St Kilda. As a cricketer he was good enough to represent the Victorian Colts.

He was St Kilda's 19th man in the 1965 VFL Grand Final, which was won by Essendon. The following season, St Kilda claimed their first ever premiership but Morton missed out, having spent the entire year out of the seniors due to injury.

In 1967 he joined South Bendigo, in the Bendigo Football League. He topped the league goal-kicking in 1968 with 108 goals.
