= Angus Schumacher =

Australian rules footballer (born 1999)

Personal information
- Born: 16 March 1999 (age 27)
- Original team: Strathfieldsaye
- Draft: No. 70, 2017 national draft
- Debut: Round 20, 2019, Carlton vs. West Coast, at Marvel Stadium
- Height: 193 cm (6 ft 4 in)
- Weight: 86 kg (190 lb)
- Position: Midfielder
- Other occupation: Clontarf Foundation

Club information
- Current club: North Adelaide
- Number: 5

Playing career^{1}
Years	Club	Games (Goals)
2018–2019	Carlton	1(0)
2020-2024	East Perth	69 (27)
- ^{1} Playing statistics correct to the end of the 2019 season.

Angus Schumacher (born 16 March 1999) is an Australian rules footballer playing for North Adelaide in the South Australian National Football League (SANFL). He previously spent two seasons with Carlton in the Australian Football League (AFL) and 5 seasons with East Perth in the Western Australian Football League (WAFL).

Originally from Naracoorte, South Australia, Schumacher moved to Strathfieldsaye, Victoria, at the age of 12 and played junior football for the local club. He supported Carlton from a young age after receiving a club guernsey. As a junior, Schumacher played midfield and defensive roles, employing his penetrating kicking skills to rebound from the back half. He played for the Bendigo Pioneers in the TAC Cup from 2016, becoming vice-captain in 2017 and finishing third in the club's best and fairest. Schumacher represented Vic Country in two matches of the 2017 AFL Under 18 Championships and tested at the 2017 AFL Draft Combine, performing particularly well on the goalkicking and field kicking tests.

Schumacher was selected by Carlton with pick 70 in the 2017 national draft. He wore number 19 while at the club. Schumacher spent the majority of his Carlton stint with the Northern Blues, the club's Victorian Football League affiliate, playing 32 games and kicking four goals over two years. Near the end of the 2019 season, he made his AFL debut against West Coast in round 20, but was delisted post-season without playing another match. He trained with St Kilda prior to the 2019 draft in the hope of continuing with a second AFL club, but signed with East Perth after missing out on selection. After 5 seasons with East Perth, Schumacher signed with North Adelaide for the 2025 season.

Schumacher graduated with a Bachelor of Business (Sport Management) at Deakin University in 2022.
