= Ray McHugh =

Australian rules footballer

Personal information
- Full name: Ray J. McHugh
- Born: 2 July 1938
- Died: 26 November 1983 (aged 45)
- Original team: Sandhurst
- Height: 187 cm (6 ft 2 in)
- Weight: 89 kg (196 lb)

Playing career^{1}
Years	Club	Games (Goals)
1960–1965	St Kilda	61 (39)
- ^{1} Playing statistics correct to the end of 1965.

Ray McHugh (2 July 1938 – 26 November 1983) was an Australian rules footballer who played with St Kilda in the Victorian Football League (VFL).

McHugh was a star player in the Bendigo Football League before joining St Kilda. He topped the league's goal-kicking in 1956 with 71 goals and at the age of just 16 had been signed by Richmond, only to remain in Bendigo. It would instead be St. Kilda that got his signature when he moved to Melbourne in 1960. He was used mostly as a strong marking centre half-back or in the ruck but could also push forward and kicked five goals in a win over Collingwood at Junction Oval in 1962.

He missed out on being part of St. Kilda's premiership triumph in 1966, playing his last game for the club in 1965. Instead, McHugh was the coach of Frankston for their inaugural Victorian Football Association season in 1966.
