= Noel Evans =

Noel Evans may refer to:

- Noel Evans (footballer) (born 1930), Australian rules footballer
- Noel Evans (cricketer) (1911–1964), English cricketer
