= Strathfieldsaye Football Club =

Strathfieldsaye

Names
- Full name: Strathfieldsaye Football & Netball Club
- Nickname: Storm

2022 season
- After finals: 2nd
- Home-and-away season: 3rd

Club details
- Founded: September 2007; 18 years ago
- Colours: Navy blue White
- Competition: Bendigo Football League(2009-)
- Premierships: 4 2014, 2015, 2017, 2019
- Ground: Strathfieldsaye Recreation Reserve, Strathfieldsaye

Uniforms
Home	Away

Other information
- Official website: SFNC

The Strathfieldsaye Football Netball Club, nicknamed the Storm, is an Australian rules football and netball club based in the Bendigo suburb of Strathfieldsaye, Victoria.

The club teams currently compete in the Bendigo Football Netball League.

== History ==
A predecessor of the current club was founded in 1978 as the "Mandurang-Strathfieldsaye Junior Football Club". This club was formed due to the need to facilitate the increasing population of junior footballers in the Mandurang and Strathfieldsaye district. The club commenced playing in the Bendigo Junior Football League. In 2003 the club became known as the Strathfieldsaye Junior Football Club (Strathfieldsaye JFC).

By 2007 there was enough interest in a senior club forming and in September 2007 the "Strathfieldsaye Football Netball Club" was formed. There were discussions on whether to join the stronger, regional major league and compete in the Bendigo Football League or join the lower, regional district league and compete in the Heathcote District Football League to get the club established, but the members voted overwhelmingly for the Bendigo Football League. The club decided that the Bendigo League was ultimately where they wanted to play, so the committee submitted a business plan to get to a higher standard as quickly as possible. In 2008, an application to join the Bendigo Football League for the following season was submitted and accepted. The club identity 'Strath Storm' was created and the club adopted playing colours of blue & white hoops as these were the colours of the Strathfieldsaye JFC.

In 2009 the Strathfieldsaye Storm competed in senior competition for the first time and in 2012 they played in their first finals series winning both the elimination and first semi-final, before losing the preliminary final.

In 2013 the Storm made their first Grand Final after finishing the Home and Away season on top with 12 wins and 1 draw from 16 games, however lost the Grand Final to Golden Square by 21 points. The Storm went on to claim their first Premiership in 2014, defeating Sandhurst by 55 points.

In 2017, all the football grades of the club (seniors, reserves and U18) won the premiership.

== Club song ==
Oh we're from Strathfieldsaye
A fighting fury we're from Strathfieldsaye
In any weather you'll see us with a grin
Risking head and shin
If we're behind then never mind
We'll fight and fight and win
For we're from Strathfieldsaye
We never weaken til the final siren's gone
Like the Ranga's of old
We're strong and we're bold
For we're from Strathfield
(blue and white)
We're from Strathfieldsaye
GO STORM

*The term "Ranga's" is a direct reference to the foundation club being Mandurang/Strathfieldsaye JFC and reflects the heritage of the original club.

== Year by year performance (home and away only) ==
Year	Wins	Draws	Losses	For	Against	%	Ladder Position
2009	4	-	14	1454	2089	69.6	9
2010	6	-	12	1643	2226	73.8	7
2011	9	-	9	1807	1456	124.1	6
2012	12	-	6	1986	1490	133.3	4
2013	12	1	3	1645	1020	161.3	1
2014	17	-	1	2174	995	218.5	1*
2015	18	-	-	2081	938	221.9	1*
2016	14	-	4	1715	1034	165.9	3
2017	15	-	3	2267	1039	218.2	2*
2018	16	-	2	2198	974	225.7	1
2019	17	-	1	2646	846	312.8	1*
2020	Season cancelled due to COVID-19 pandemic in Victoria						
2021	10	-	2	1469	634	231.7	1 <
2022	14	-	4	1966	1058	185.8	3
Total	164	1	61	25051	15799	158.6	3.1

* denotes Premiership winning year

< denotes ladder position held when Season was abandoned due to COVID-19 pandemic in Victoria

== Honours ==
Senior Football - Premierships & Grand Finals

League	Total Premierships	Premiership Years
Bendigo Football League	4	2014, 2015, 2017, 2019

Year	Winner	Runner-up	Score
2013	Golden Square Bulldogs	Strathfieldsaye Storm	14.18 (102) – 12.9 (81)
2014	Strathfieldsaye Storm	Sandhurst Dragons	20.18 (138) – 12.11 (83)
2015	Strathfieldsaye Storm	Sandhurst Dragons	8.12 (60) – 8.5 (53)
2017	Strathfieldsaye Storm	Eaglehawk Hawks	13.10 (88) – 7.14 (56)
2018	Eaglehawk Hawks	Strathfieldsaye Storm	19.8 (122) - 11.7 (73)
2019	Strathfieldsaye Storm	Eaglehawk Hawks	14.10 (94) – 10.20 (80)
2022	Gisborne Bulldogs	Strathfieldsaye Storm	5.20 (50) - 2.10 (22)

Senior Football Club Captains

- Michael Pilcher & Jono Gawthrop 2009 - 2010
- Shannon Geary 2011 - 2015 (Premiership 2014 & 2015)
- Jayden Donaldson & Shannon Geary 2016 - 2017 (Premiership 2017)
- Kallen Geary 2018 - 2019 (Premiership 2019)
- Lachlan Sharp 2020 - Current

== Bibliography ==
- History of Football in the Bendigo District, John Stoward, ISBN 978-0-9805929-1-7
