= Brendan Hartney =

Australian rules footballer

Personal information
- Full name: Brendan Hartney
- Born: 23 April 1958 (age 68)
- Original team: Sandhurst (BFL)
- Height: 183 cm (6 ft 0 in)
- Weight: 79 kg (174 lb)
- Position: Centre half back

Playing career^{1}
| Years | Club | Games (Goals) |
| 1981–1985 | Carlton | 32 (0) |
- ^{1} Playing statistics correct to the end of 1985.

Brendan Hartney (born 23 April 1958) is a former Australian rules footballer who played with Carlton in the Victorian Football League (VFL).

Hartney's nephew Fergus Greene played for Hawthorn and the Western Bulldogs.
