= Bill White (Australian footballer) =

Australian rules footballer, born 1916

Personal information
- Full name: William Edward White
- Born: 6 October 1916; Long Gully, Victoria, Australia
- Died: 3 October 1990 (aged 73)
- Original team: Sandhurst
- Height: 175 cm (5 ft 9 in)
- Weight: 76 kg (168 lb)

Playing career^{1}
Years	Club	Games (Goals)
1941	Richmond	8 (1)
- ^{1} Playing statistics correct to the end of 1941.

William Edward White (6 October 1916 – 3 October 1990) was an Australian rules footballer who played with Richmond in the Victorian Football League (VFL). White came to Richmond from Bendigo club Sandhurst. He played in eight senior games for Richmond in the 1941 VFL season. Later, in 1947, White was involved in a four-way tie for the Bendigo Football League's best and fairest award.
