= Steven Oliver (footballer) =

Australian rules footballer and politician

Personal information
- Full name: Steven Wayne Oliver
- Born: 14 January 1971 (age 55)
- Original team: Castlemaine
- Draft: No. 26, 1987 national draft
- Height: 190 cm (6 ft 3 in)
- Weight: 86 kg (190 lb)
- Position: Forward

Playing career^{1}
Years	Club	Games (Goals)
1992–1994	Carlton	13 (8)
- ^{1} Playing statistics correct to the end of 1994.

Steven Wayne Oliver (born 14 January 1971) is a former Australian rules footballer who played with Carlton in the Australian Football League (AFL) during the early 1990s.

Oliver, a forward from Castlemaine, was only 16 when he was selected by Carlton in the 1987 VFL draft. Like another draftee that year, Jamie Cox, Oliver was also a gifted cricketer and captained Victoria at the Australian Under-17 Championships in 1987/88. An all-rounder, he took 11 wickets in the tournament, including that of future Test player Damien Martyn. He ultimately chose to pursue a career in football but had to wait until he was 21 to make his senior AFL debut.

His first two league games came in the opening two rounds of the 1992 AFL season but he had no impact and was not selected for the rest of the year. He instead had a highly successful year with Castlemaine in the Bendigo Football League (BFL), kicking over 100 goals in the home and away season, before finishing the season with a premiership.

Oliver made six AFL appearances in 1993 and performed well when put at full-forward, filling in for an injured Stephen Kernahan. By the time the finals came he was out of the side and did not participate in Carlton's run to the grand final. After putting together just five games in 1994, Oliver returned home to Castlemaine for good.

He topped the BFL goal-kicking on three further occasions, in 1996, 2000 and 2005. In 2000 he had reached the one hundred goal mark for a third time, having also achieved the feat back in 1991 after a strong finals series. Castlemaine were the premiership winners in his two most prolific seasons, 1992 and 2000. He also won three Castlemaine "Best and Fairest" awards and towards the end of his time at the club became just the second player in BFL history to reach 1000 career goals.

Oliver was the manager of the Bendigo Golf Club after a five-year stint as the General Manager of the Bendigo Football Netball League, he is currently the manager at PFD Bendigo, and in 2010 ran as a National Party candidate for the seat of Bendigo West in the state election. Although the vote count was close enough to be decided by preferences, Oliver was unable to stop Maree Edwards from retaining the seat for Labor.
