= Noel Evans (footballer) =

Australian rules footballer

Personal information
- Full name: Noel Raymond Evans
- Born: 14 November 1930
- Died: 2 June 1975 (aged 44)
- Original team: Sandhurst
- Height: 173 cm (5 ft 8 in)
- Weight: 66 kg (146 lb)

Playing career^{1}
| Years | Club | Games (Goals) |
| 1953 | Carlton | 1 (0) |
- ^{1} Playing statistics correct to the end of 1953.

Noel Raymond Evans (14 November 1930 – 2 June 1975) was an Australian rules footballer who played with Carlton in the Victorian Football League (VFL).

Evans won the Bendigo Football League's Michelsen Medal in 1953, while playing for Sandhurst. During the year he made one appearance for Carlton, in their round two win over Melbourne at the MCG.
