= Arthur Hando =

Australian rules footballer

Personal information
- Full name: Arthur Hando
- Born: 6 June 1891; Wychitella, Victoria
- Died: 14 February 1949 (aged 57); Glen Innes, New South Wales
- Original team: Brunswick (VFA)
- Height: 189 cm (6 ft 2 in)
- Weight: 91 kg (201 lb)

Playing career^{1}
Years	Club	Games (Goals)
1922–1924	South Melbourne	45 (0)
- ^{1} Playing statistics correct to the end of 1924.

Arthur Hando (6 June 1891 – 14 February 1949) was an Australian rules footballer who played for the South Melbourne Football Club in the Victorian Football League (VFL).

Recruited from Victorian Football Association (VFA) club Brunswick, Hando made his senior VFL debut in 1922. He was once reported for shaking the goalpost while Cliff Rankin was preparing to shoot for goal.

Following the end of his VFL career, Hando captain-coached Bendigo Football League (BFL) club South Bendigo, leading them to the 1925 premiership.

== Sources ==
- Blair, L. (2005) Immortals, John Wiley & Sons Australia: Milton, Qld. ISBN 1 74031 104 3.
