= Jim McDonald (footballer, born 1913) =

Australian rules footballer, born 1913

Personal information
- Full name: James William McDonald
- Born: 15 June 1913; Ararat, Victoria
- Died: 28 September 1984 (aged 71); Meeniyan, Victoria
- Original teams: Dumbalk, Leongatha
- Height: 175 cm (5 ft 9 in)
- Weight: 65 kg (143 lb)
- Position: Rover

Playing career^{1}
Years	Club	Games (Goals)
1942–43	Melbourne	1 (0)
- ^{1} Playing statistics correct to the end of 1942.

James William McDonald (15 June 1913 – 28 September 1984) was an Australian rules footballer who played with Melbourne in the Victorian Football League (VFL).

McDonald won an incredible six consecutive South Gippsland Football League best and fairest awards from 1932 to 1937 and was also runner up in 1939, when playing for Dumbalk Football Club and near the end of his career had played 450 plus games.

Older brother of former Richmond player and coach, Alan McDonald.

The McDonald brothers were coach by their father, H S McDonald, who was still playing football at 58 and in his 37 season.
