= Jim Byrne (footballer, born 1933) =

Australian rules footballer

James "Jim" Byrne

Personal information
- Full name: James B. Byrne
- Born: 22 June 1933 (age 93)
- Original team: Sandhurst
- Height: 188 cm (6 ft 2 in)
- Weight: 96 kg (212 lb)

Playing career^{1}
Years	Club	Games (Goals)
1956–1957	St Kilda	5 (0)
- ^{1} Playing statistics correct to the end of 1957.

James Byrne (born 22 June 1933) is a former Australian rules footballer who played with St Kilda in the Victorian Football League (VFL).

Byrne, a ruckman, won the a Michelsen Medal while with Sandhurst in 1955.

He left Bendigo for Melbourne in 1956 and appeared in the opening three rounds of the 1956 VFL season for St Kilda. His permit had only been for those three games and St Kilda were then refused a clearance by Sandhurst.

The following year he was cleared to St Kilda and played in the first two rounds of the season before suffering a knee injury, which would ultimately end his football career.

He would go on to buy a farm in Lockington and coach the local football team.
