= Clive Philp =

Australian rules footballer

Personal information
- Full name: Clive Alexander Philp
- Born: 28 February 1926; Fitzroy, Victoria
- Died: 24 August 2007 (aged 81)
- Original team: Box Hill
- Height: 178 cm (5 ft 10 in)
- Weight: 80 kg (176 lb)

Playing career^{1}
Years	Club	Games (Goals)
1948–1955	Hawthorn	112 (23)
- ^{1} Playing statistics correct to the end of 1955.

Clive Alexander Philp (28 February 1926 – 24 August 2007) was an Australian rules footballer who played with Hawthorn in the Victorian Football League (VFL).

== War service ==
Philp enlisted in the Royal Australian Air Force at the age of 16 in 1942 and served until the end of the war.

== Football ==
Philp was a key position player and played 112 games for Hawthorn during his career. He represented Victoria in three interstate football matches.

In 1956 he captain-coached Rutherglen and finished third in the Morris Medal.

He then played with and coached Kyneton.

In 1959 he was the Bendigo Football League's Michelsen Medal winner and then topped the competition's goal-kicking lists in 1960. He coached Kyneton to premierships in 1960 and 1961.

== Links ==
- 1956 – Rutherglen FC team photo
