= Derek Cowen =

Australian rules footballer

Personal information
- Full name: Derek Cowen
- Born: 20 April 1939
- Original team: West Coburg
- Height: 185 cm (6 ft 1 in)
- Weight: 92 kg (203 lb)

Playing career^{1}
Years	Club	Games (Goals)
1960–1962	North Melbourne	30 (1)
- ^{1} Playing statistics correct to the end of 1962.

Derek Cowen (born 20 April 1939) is a former Australian rules footballer who played with North Melbourne in the Victorian Football League (VFL).

A ruckman, Cowen was recruited to North Melbourne from West Coburg. He played 17 of a possible 18 games in 1960 but struggled with injuries over the next few seasons.

In 1963 he joined Irymple in the Sunraysia Football League for a two-year stint as playing coach. Cowen then coached Castlemaine to the 1966 Bendigo Football League premiership. He also won back to back Michelsen Medals while at Castlemaine, which are awarded to the league's best and fairest player, in 1966 and 1967.
