= John Ledwidge =

Australian rules footballer (1934–2018)

Personal information
- Full name: John Ledwidge
- Born: 28 September 1934
- Died: 24 November 2018 (aged 84)
- Original team: Middle Park YCW
- Height: 191 cm (6 ft 3 in)
- Weight: 91 kg (201 lb)

Playing career^{1}
Years	Club	Games (Goals)
1954–58	South Melbourne	40 (11)
- ^{1} Playing statistics correct to the end of 1958.

John Ledwidge (28 September 1934 – 24 November 2018) was an Australian rules footballer who played with South Melbourne in the Victorian Football League (VFL).

Ledwidge went onto play and coach in 455 Bendigo Football League matches and between 1959 and 1965 Ledwidge lead Golden Square to premierships in 1964 and 1965.

Ledwidge was captain-coach of the Bendigo Football League representative team that won the 1962 VCFL Caltex Country Football Championships by defeating the Wimmera Football League at Horsham.

Ledwidge was captain-coach of Eaglehawk's 1968 Bendigo Football League premiership and coach of their 1971 premiership.

Ledwidge's service to the Bendigo Football League spanned 28 seasons, 185 matches as a player and 270 matches as a coach, which included four premierships.
