= Brian Walsh (footballer, born 1951) =

Australian rules footballer (1951–2023)

Personal information
- Full name: Brian Thomas Walsh
- Born: 24 April 1951
- Died: 9 August 2023 (aged 72); Bendigo, Victoria, Australia
- Original team: Sandhurst (Bendigo FL)
- Debut: Round 1, 1970, Carlton vs. Essendon, at Princes Park
- Height: 179 cm (5 ft 10 in)
- Weight: 81 kg (179 lb)

Playing career^{1}
Years	Club	Games (Goals)
1970–1975	Carlton	64 (111)
1975–1978	Essendon	51 (100)
Total		115 (211)
- ^{1} Playing statistics correct to the end of 1978.

Career highlights
- Carlton Leading Goalkicker 1973

Brian Thomas Walsh (24 April 1951 – 9 August 2023) was an Australian rules footballer who played for Carlton and Essendon in the Victorian Football League (VFL) during the 1970s.

From Sandhurst, Walsh had his best year in 1973 when he won Carlton's Best Clubman Award and topped their goalkicking with 60 goals, including a bag of eight against South Melbourne at Lake Oval. He was a rover in the 1973 Grand Final but finished on the losing team.

In 1975 he joined Essendon and kicked exactly 100 goals for the club over four seasons. He finished his career at Victorian Football Association club Werribee and was their captain-coach in 1981, winning Werribee's best and fairest award.

Walsh coached the Wangaratta Football Club in 1993, losing a close Ovens & Murray Football League Preliminary Final by three points.

Brian Walsh died on 9 August 2023 after a long battle with an illness. He was 72.

== Sources ==
- Brian Walsh's playing statistics from AFL Tables
- Blueseum profile
