= Queen Elizabeth Oval =

Sports stadium in Bendigo, Australia

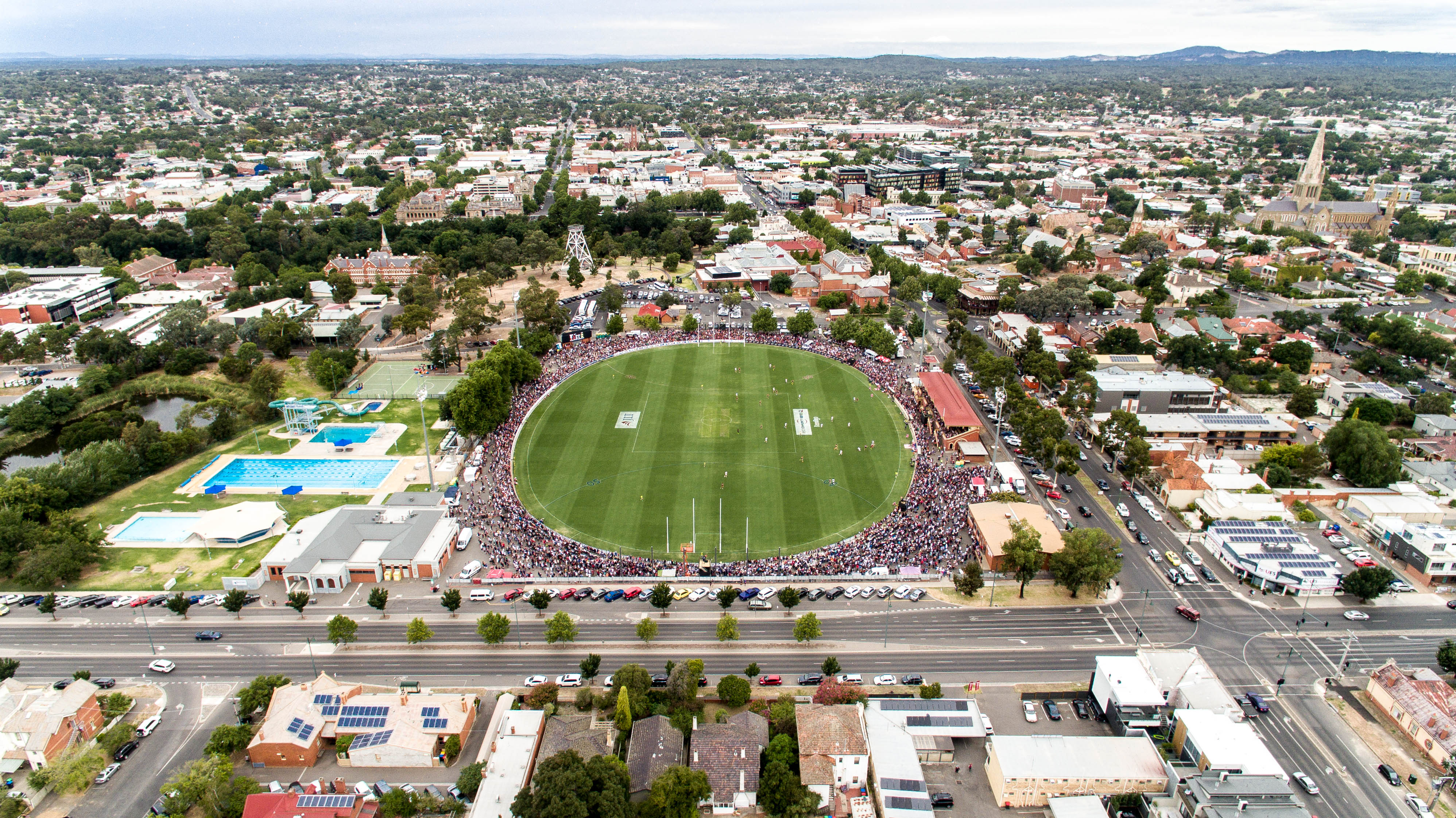
- Interactive map of Queen Elizabeth Oval
- Full name: Queen Elizabeth II Oval
- Former names: Camp Reserve (1853–1879); Upper Reserve (1880–1953)
- Location: Bendigo, Victoria, Australia
- Coordinates: 36.755644°S 144.275562°E
- Capacity: 10,000
- Surface: Grass
- Field size: 168 metres × 124 metres

Construction
- Renovated: 2001; 25 years ago

Tenants
- Bendigo Football Club (VFL, 1998-2014); Richmond Football Club (AFLW) (2020); Bendigo Pioneers (VSFL U18/TAC Cup/NAB League/Talent League/TAC Cup Girls/NAB League Girls/Talent League Girls) (1993-present); South Bendigo Football Club (BFL); Sandhurst Football Club (BFL); Bendigo & District Cricket Association; 2004 Commonwealth Youth Games (Rugby Sevens)

Ground information
- Only women's Test: 25 January 1985: Australia v England
- As of 8 September 2020; Source: CricketArchive

Queen Elizabeth Oval (QEO) is a sports stadium located in Bendigo, Australia primarily used for Australian rules football and cricket. It was opened in 1897 as Upper Reserve before being renamed in 1954 in honour of the Queen of Australia, Queen Elizabeth II.

== History ==
The Bendigo recreation reserve was initially known as the Government Camp Reserve in 1853, and this area was reserved for public space under the name of Pall Mall Reserve, Bendigo.

This reserve was later referred as the Upper Reserve for many years before being renamed in 1954 in honour of the Queen of Australia, Queen Elizabeth II.

In 1858, a famous foot race took place on the Camp Reserve between Hayes and aboriginal runner, Sheppard for £200 over 200 yards, with 5,000 people present in which Hayes won by three yards.

In 1869, the Andrew's Society held their sports day on the Camp Reserve.

Grandstand

Tenders for the new grandstand at the Upper Reserve were published by the Bendigo City Council in November 1900 and the plans were drawn up by the Bendigo City Surveyor, Mr J W Richardson, with a seating capacity of 1500 people. The tender for the full erection of the grandstand was awarded to Mr G A Davey at a cost of £2546. The new grandstand was used for the first time on Wednesday, 19th June 1901 in an Australian Rules football match between Bendigo Football Club and South Bendigo Football Club.

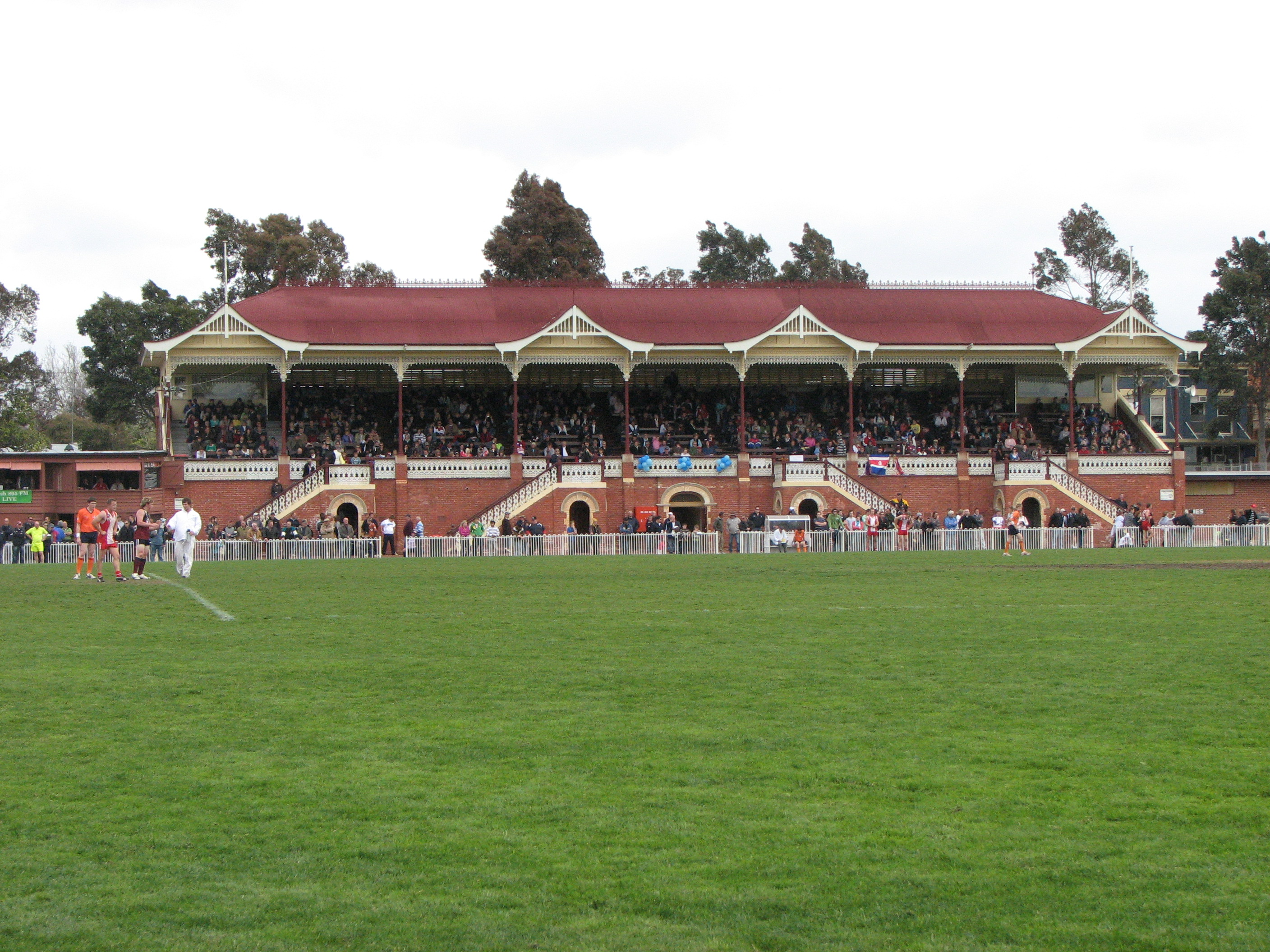
Queen Elizabeth Oval, Bendigo

=== Cricket ===
The Upper Reserve hosted touring cricket teams as early as 1897. It was renamed in April 1954 in honour of Queen Elizabeth's visit to Bendigo earlier that year. The ground hosted two World Series Cricket exhibition matches in 1977 and 1979. During the 1990s one List A and two first-class matches were held at the ground. It also hosted one Women's Test cricket in 1985 between Australia and England. In June 2025, it was announced that a statue of Barbara Rae, the highest scorer at Australia's first ever women's cricket match in 1874, would be erected at the Queen Elizabeth Oval.

=== Australian rules football ===
Bendigo Football League (BFL) teams Sandhurst and South Bendigo play home games at the stadium. The ground is also used for BFL finals series. The Oval hosted the Bendigo Football Club throughout its time in the Victorian Football League (VFL), from 1998 until 2014.

=== Other uses ===
In 1988 the oval hosted an international association football match between Australia and New Zealand. The venue also played host to the Rugby sevens competition at the 2004 Commonwealth Youth Games.

== Facilities ==
On 29 February 2008, at an NAB Challenge Cup game under lights, there was a blackout in the final quarter.

In 2011 the ground was redeveloped at a cost of A$2.2m. The upgrade included a new terraced seating section, capable of holding 900 people, the installation of all-weather grass, lighting being upgraded to Australian Football League (AFL) standard, and a new electronic scoreboard and big screen being installed. Asbestos in the grandstand was also removed.

== See also ==
- List of sports venues named after individuals
