= Jimmy Davidson (Australian footballer) =

Australian rules footballer, born 1904

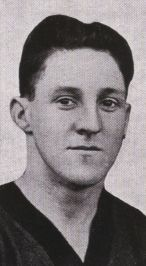

Personal information
- Full name: James Davidson
- Born: 13 August 1904
- Died: 24 November 1953 (aged 49)
- Original team: Walhalla
- Height: 165 cm (5 ft 5 in)
- Weight: 62 kg (137 lb)

Playing career^{1}
Years	Club	Games (Goals)
1924–1932	Melbourne	137 (62)
- ^{1} Playing statistics correct to the end of 1932.

James Davidson (13 August 1904 – 24 November 1953) was an Australian rules footballer who played with Melbourne in the Victorian Football League (VFL).

From Walhalla originally, Davidson played junior football for Melbourne, before breaking into the senior side in 1924. He played most of his football as a rover.

Davidson was a half forward flanker in Melbourne's 1926 premiership team.

He put together 83 consecutive games from 1927 to 1931.

Davidson went to Bendigo Football League club Castlemaine, as coach, in 1933. He won the league's best and fairest award, the Fred Wood Medal that season.
