= Denis Lenaghan =

Australian rules footballer

Personal information
- Full name: Denis Lenaghan
- Born: 18 November 1956 (age 69)
- Original team: Sandhurst
- Height: 174 cm (5 ft 9 in)
- Weight: 71 kg (157 lb)
- Position: Rover

Playing career^{1}
Years	Club	Games (Goals)
1981–1982	Carlton	9 (9)
1983–1984	Geelong	16 (19)
Total		25 (28)
- ^{1} Playing statistics correct to the end of 1984.

Denis Lenaghan (born 18 November 1956) is a former Australian rules footballer who played with Carlton and Geelong in the Victorian Football League (VFL).
