= Alan McDonald (Australian footballer) =

Australian rules footballer, born 1918

Personal information
- Full name: Alan Joseph McDonald
- Born: 23 June 1918; Yarram, Victoria
- Died: 2 May 1999 (aged 80); Bendigo, Victoria
- Original teams: Dumbalk, Meeniyan, Leongatha
- Height: 173 cm (5 ft 8 in)
- Weight: 66 kg (146 lb)

Playing career^{1}
Years	Club	Games (Goals)
1939–1943	Richmond	49 (8)

Coaching career
Years	Club	Games (W–L–D)
1957–1960	Richmond	72 (22–48–2)
- ^{1} Playing statistics correct to the end of 1943.

Alan Joseph McDonald (23 June 1918 – 2 May 1999) was an Australian rules football player who played in the VFL between 1939 and 1941 and then again in 1943 for the Richmond Football Club.

Recruited from Dumbalk, in the South Gippsland Football League, where his father was captain-coach in 1939 at the age of 58 and he had three brothers who all played with Dumbalk too.

McDonald played a fine game in Richmond's losing 1940 VFL Grand Final loss to Melbourne.

After World War II McDonald played two seasons for Camberwell in the VFA.

He then coached South Bendigo from 1947 to 1956, which included five Bendigo Football League premierships in 1950, 1951, 1954, 1955 and 1956.

McDonald was senior coach of Richmond from 1957 to 1960, where they finished 7th in 1957, 10th in 1958 and 11th in 1959

Alan was the younger brother of Melbourne player, Jim McDonald

== Links ==
- Alan McDonald profile via TigerlandArchieve
