= Tony Southcombe =

Australian rules footballer

Personal information
- Full name: Robert Anthony Southcombe
- Born: 21 July 1950 (age 76); Bendigo, Victoria
- Original team: Golden Square (BFL)
- Height: 188 cm (6 ft 2 in)
- Weight: 89 kg (196 lb)
- Position: Ruckman

Playing career^{1}
Years	Club	Games (Goals)
1977	Carlton	13 (11)
- ^{1} Playing statistics correct to the end of 1977.

Career highlights
- BFL Premierships: Golden Square - 1972, 75, 76, 79. Northern United - 1984, 85, 86, 87. NCFL Boort - 1982.; 1972 & 75 Bendigo Football League Michelsen Medal; 1980 North Central Football League Feeney Medal; Golden Square Football Club Hall of Fame inductee

Robert Anthony Southcombe (born 21 July 1950) is a former Australian rules football player who played for the Carlton Football Club in the Victorian Football League in 1977. Southcombe was a bespectacled ruckman who played 13 games for Carlton in 1977 before returning to the bush.
