= Les Borrack =

Australian rules footballer

Personal information
- Full name: Duncan Ronald Leslie Borrack
- Born: 25 April 1933; Ballarat, Victoria
- Original team: Redan
- Height: 180 cm (5 ft 11 in)
- Weight: 80 kg (176 lb)
- Position: Centre

Playing career^{1}
| Years | Club | Games (Goals) |
| 1953–60 | Geelong | 95 (15) |
- ^{1} Playing statistics correct to the end of 1960.

Duncan Ronald Leslie "Les" Borrack (born 25 April 1933) is a former Australian rules footballer who played with Geelong in the Victorian Football League (VFL).
