= Gisborne Football Club =

Australian sports club

Gisborne

Names
- Full name: Gisborne Football & Netball Club
- Nickname: Bulldogs

2023 season
- Home-and-away season: 7th

Club details
- Founded: 1879; 147 years ago
- Colours
- Competition: Bendigo Football League
- President: Tony Brancatisano
- Premierships: 18: 1909, 1934, 1962, 1965, 1967, 1972, 1975, 1978, 1979, 1997, 1998, 1999, 2002, 2003, 2005, 2006, 2022, 2026
- Ground: Gardiner Reserve

Uniforms
Home

Other information
- Official website: gfnc.com.au

The Gisborne Football Netball Club, nicknamed the Bulldogs, is an Australian rules football and netball club located in the town of Gisborne, Victoria.

The club teams joined the Bendigo Football Netball League in 2000. In August 2026, the club is set to leave the Bendigo League and join the Ballarat Football Netball League for the 2027 season onwards.

== Football Premierships ==
Seniors

- Gisborne District Football Association (1):
  - 1909
- Riddell District Football League (1913-1999) (11):
  - 1934, 1962, 1965, 1967, 1972, 1975, 1978, 1979, 1997, 1998, 1999
- Bendigo Football League (2000-2026) (6):
  - 2002, 2003, 2005, 2006, 2022, 2026

== League Best & Fairest Awards ==
Seniors

- Riddell District Football League - Harry O. White Medal
  - 1937 - J James
- Riddell District Football League - Bowen Medal
  - 1950 - Frank Fitzgerald
  - 1963, 1965, 1967 - Tom Sankey
  - 1980 - John Fitzgerald
- Bendigo Football League - Michelsen Medal
  - 2003 - Matt Fitzgerald
  - 2004 - Simon Elsum
  - 2005 - Luke Saunders
  - 2007 - Matt Fitzgerald
  - 2012 - Scott Walsh
  - 2024 - Bradley Bernaki and Braidon Blake

== Notable players ==
- Alex Gardiner (Footscray wingman of the 1950s and 1960s)
- Aaron James (AFL footballer who was a member of Gisborne's 2002 premiership team)
- Gareth John (Sydney Swans and North Melbourne ruckman)
- Michael Werner (AFL footballer who kicked 173 goals for Gisborne in 1997)
- Bruce Hay (RDFL played in over 300 games and a member in four Premiership teams in the 1970s and 80's)
