= South Bendigo Football Netball Club =

South Bendigo

Names
- Full name: South Bendigo Football & Netball Club
- Nickname(s): Bloods

2024 season
- After finals: 7th
- Home-and-away season: 7th
- Leading goalkicker: Steven Stoobants (52)

Club details
- Founded: 1893; 132 years ago
- Colours: Red White
- Competition: Bendigo Football League
- Premierships: 23 List: 1899, 1902, 1904, 1905, 1909, 1910, 1911, 1912, 1914, 1919, 1921, 1925, 1950, 1951, 1954, 1955, 1956, 1969, 1974, 1990, 1991, 1993, 1994
- Ground(s): Queen Elizabeth Oval

Uniforms
Home	Away

Other information
- Official website: southbendigofnc.com.au

The South Bendigo Football Netball Club, nicknamed the Bloods, is an Australian rules football and netball club based in the city of Bendigo, Victoria.

The club teams currently compete in the Bendigo Football Netball League.

== History ==
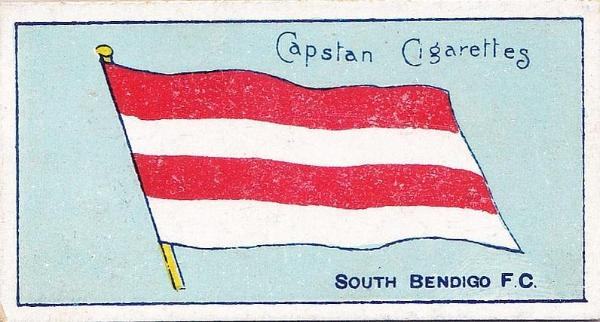
1908: South Bendigo

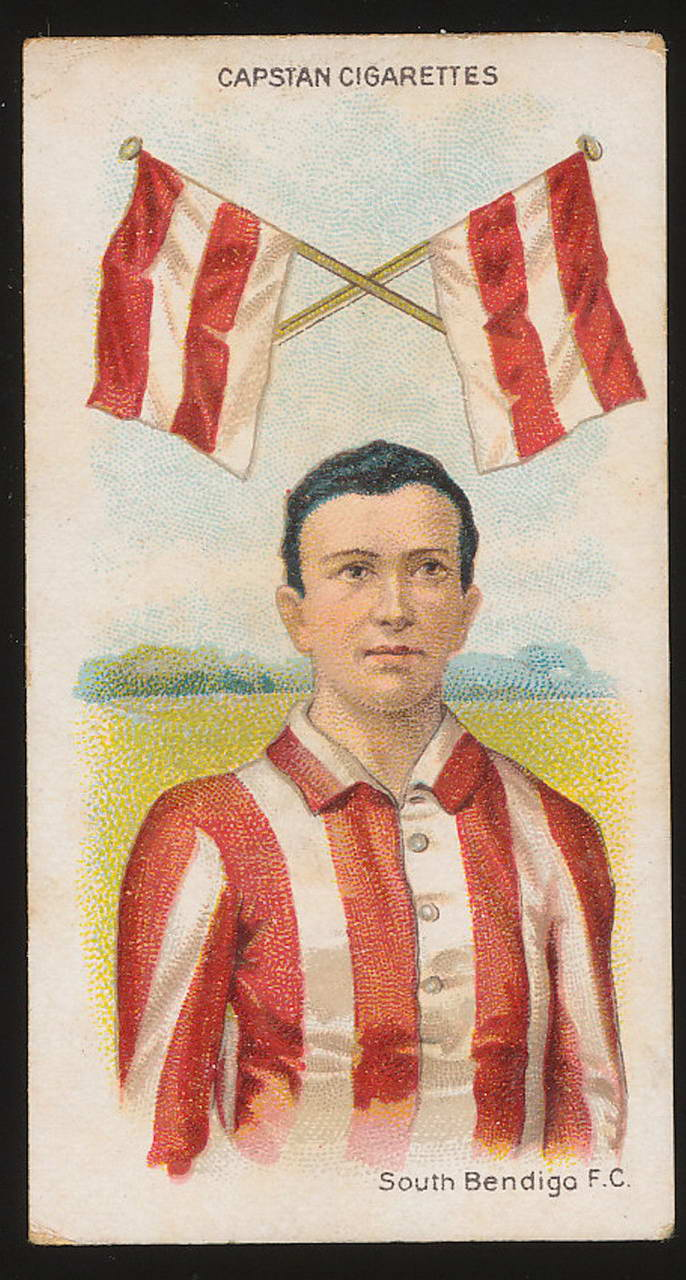
1913: South Bendigo FC

South Bendigo was established in 1893 and actually played as the Golden Square Imperials Football Club in the Bendigo Junior Football Association in 1892 prior to joining the Bendigo Football Association in 1893.

South Bendigo left the Bendigo Football Association in 1906 after a dispute over the gate takings in the 1905 Bendigo FA grand final. As a result, both South Bendigo and California Gully were suspended and they formed the Bendigo and Northern Football Association in 1906. Long Gully defeated South Bendigo by one point in the 1906 Bendigo and Northern Football Association grand final.

Since South Bendigo entered the league in 1893, no club has won more premierships. They sit third on the all-time list of BFL premierships, behind Eaglehawk and Sandhurst.

In 2023, having played for over 120 years at the Queen Elizabeth Oval, they made the move to the Harry Trott Park, which is now their permanent home ground.

== Honours ==
Premierships & Grand Finals

League	Total Premierships	Premiership Years
Bendigo Football League	23	1899, 1902, 1904, 1905, 1909, 1910, 1911, 1912, 1914, 1919, 1921, 1925, 1950, 1951, 1954, 1955, 1956, 1969, 1974, 1990, 1991, 1993, 1994

Year	Winner	
1899	South Bendigo	No official Bendigo Football Association Grand Final was played prior to 1904. Up until 1904, the team on top of the ladder at the end of the season were crowned Premiers.
1902	South Bendigo	No official Bendigo Football Association Grand Final was played prior to 1904. Up until 1904, the team on top of the ladder at the end of the season were crowned Premiers.

Year	Winner	Runner-up	Score
1904	South Bendigo	California Gully	4.13 (37) - 3.5 (23)
1905	South Bendigo	California Gully	3.9 (27) - 2.5 (17)
1909	South Bendigo	Eaglehawk	7.9 (51) - 3.2 (20)
1910	South Bendigo	California Gully	5.9 (39) - 3.10 (28)
1911	South Bendigo	Eaglehawk	7.12 (54) - 2.6 (18)
1912	South Bendigo	California Gully	13.5 (83) - 3.7 (25)
1913	Bendigo City	South Bendigo	8.8 (56) - 6.13 (49)
1914	South Bendigo	Eaglehawk	5.10 (40) - 4.6 (30)
1919	South Bendigo	Sandhurst	3.7 (25) - 2.12 (24)
1920	Sandhurst	South Bendigo	6.6 (42) – 4.5 (29)
1921	South Bendigo	Eaglehawk	6.15 (51) - 5.7 (37)
1925	South Bendigo	Castlemaine	7.12 (54) - 6.4 (40)
1929	Sandhurst	South Bendigo	18.11 (119) – 11.10 (76)
1931	Sandhurst	South Bendigo	10.14 (74) – 8.14 (62)
1937	Sandhurst	South Bendigo	16.16 (112) – 6.15 (51)
1940	Sandhurst	South Bendigo	13.18 (96) – 13.13 (91)
1941	Eaglehawk	South Bendigo	17.16 (118) – 11.14 (80)
1949	Sandhurst	South Bendigo	11.22 (88) – 9.19 (73)
1950	South Bendigo	Echuca	10.12 (72) - 6.10 (46)
1951	South Bendigo	Eaglehawk	24.12 (156) - 20.8 (128)
1954	South Bendigo	Sandhurst	11.9 (75) - 9.7 (61)
1955	South Bendigo	Sandhurst	10.7 (67) - 9.12 (66)
1956	South Bendigo	Eaglehawk	10.19 (79) - 9.15 (69)
1967	Echuca	South Bendigo	12.13 (85) – 10.15 (75)
1968	Eaglehawk	South Bendigo	8.16 (64) – 8.10 (58)
1969	South Bendigo	Eaglehawk	10.10 (70) - 9.13 (67)
1972	Golden Square	South Bendigo	14.12 (96) – 11.9 (75)
1974	South Bendigo	Sandhurst	17.13 (115) - 14.9 (93)
1989	Golden Square	South Bendigo	14.13 (97) – 11.13 (79)
1990	South Bendigo	Golden Square	15.24 (114) - 14.8 (92)
1991	South Bendigo	Castlemaine	14.14 (98) - 10.16 (76)
1993	South Bendigo	Sandhurst	20.22 (142) - 11.11 (77)
1994	South Bendigo	Golden Square	20.15 (135) - 13.9 (87)
1995	Kyneton	South Bendigo	18.13 (121) – 11.10 (76)
2009	Golden Square	South Bendigo	16.12 (108) – 10.11 (71)
2010	Golden Square	South Bendigo	11.21 (87) – 8.10 (58)

== Club song ==
Da da da da da
da da da da da (x2)
We are the red and white
We are the good ol' red and white
We're the team that comes from miles around
We'll beat 'em at home or any ol' ground
Some come to cheer us, some come to jeer us, they can't get near us
We are the team that will be premiers
We are the good ol' red and white

== VFL / AFL Players ==
The following footballers played with South Bendigo prior to making their VFL/AFL debut.

- 1904 - Robert Daykin - South Melbourne
- 1910 - Joe Scaddan - Collingwood & Subiaco coach)
- 1908 - Bert Daykin - Essendon
- 1908 - Richard Daykin - Collingwood
- 1914 - Percy Daykin - Carlton
- 1922 - Arthur Hando - South Melbourne
- 1925 - Rod Watt - Essendon
- 1941 - Jack Knight - Collingwood & St Kilda coach)
- 1984 - Peter Dean - Carlton
- 1993 - Leigh Colbert - Geelong & North Melbourne
- 2020 - Kieran Strachan - Adelaide
