= Sandhurst Football Netball Club =

Sandhurst

Names
- Full name: Sandhurst Football & Netball Club Inc.
- Nickname: Dragons

2025 season
- After finals: 2nd (Runner Up)
- Home-and-away season: 1st
- Leading goalkicker: Fergus Greene (43)
- Best and fairest: Lachlan Tardrew

Club details
- Founded: 1861; 165 years ago
- Colours
- Competition: Bendigo Football League
- Coach: Fergus Greene & Bryce Curnow
- Premierships: BFL (28) 1881, 1884, 1885, 1890, 1891, 1893, 1920, 1923, 1927, 1929, 1930, 1931, 1932, 1933, 1934, 1937, 1940, 1947, 1948, 1949, 1973, 1977, 1978, 1981, 1983, 2004, 2016, 2024
- Ground: Queen Elizabeth Oval, Bendigo

Uniforms
Home

The Sandhurst Football Netball Club, nicknamed the Dragons, is an Australian rules football and netball club based in Bendigo, Victoria. Sandhurst is the former name of that city.

The club currently competes in the Bendigo Football Netball League. The football team is tied with Eaglehawk as the most successful team in the BFNL, with 28 premierships.

== History ==
Sandhurst, who were then known as the Maroons, were one of the league's foundation clubs in 1880. They had been formed in June 1861, by Melbourne Football Club rulemaker J. B. Thompson.

The club played against the touring British footballers in 1888.

The club did not play in the BFL from 1901 to 1914, but returned to the league after the war in 1919, and have appeared in every season since.

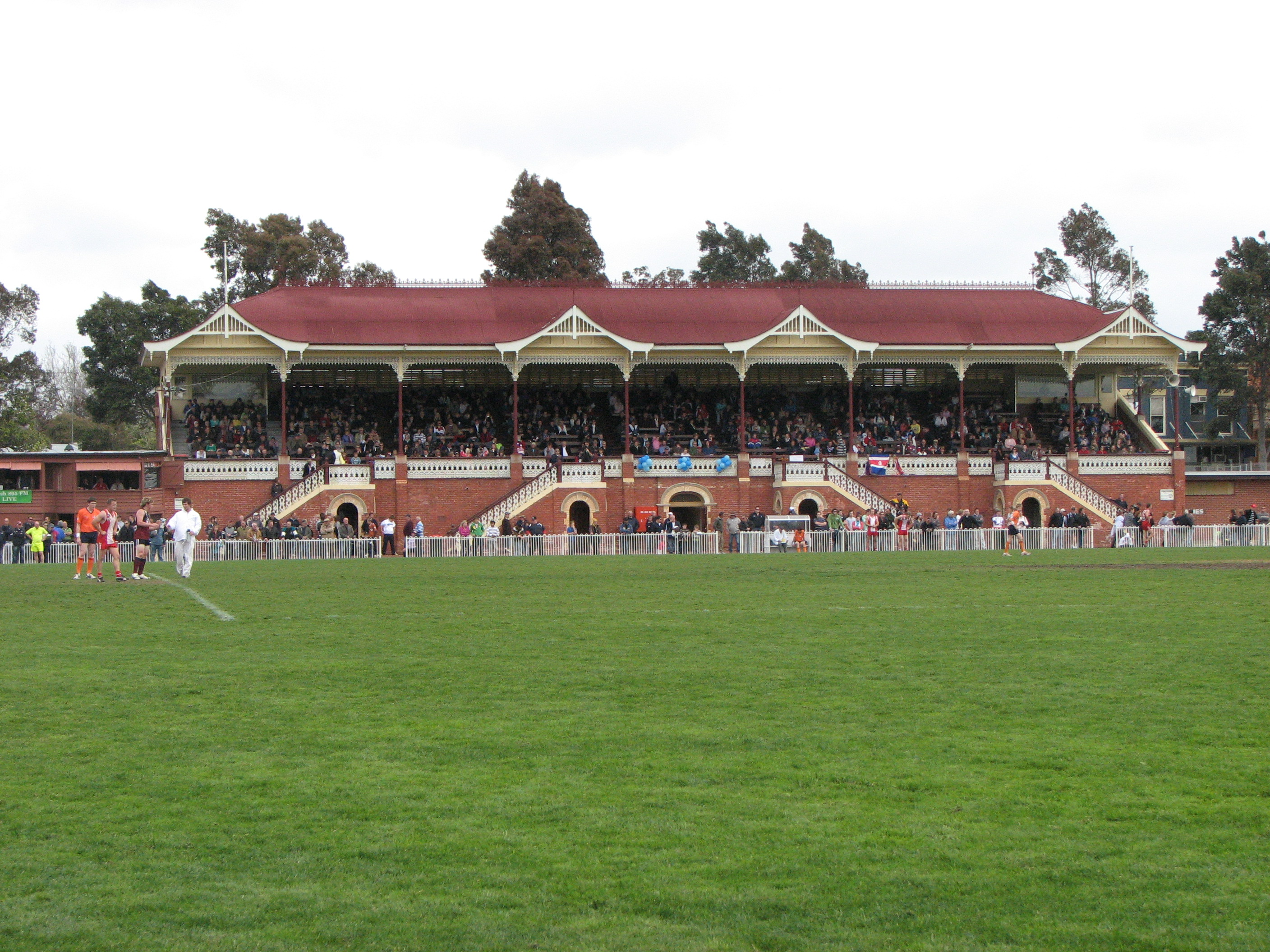
Grandstand, Queen Elizabeth Oval, 2007

== Football Premierships ==
Bendigo Football League

Seniors (28)

- 1881, 1884, 1885, 1890, 1891, 1893, 1920, 1923, 1927, 1929, 1930, 1931, 1932, 1933, 1934, 1937, 1940, 1947, 1948, 1949, 1973, 1977, 1978, 1981, 1983, 2004, 2016, 2024

Reserves

- ?

Thirds

- ?

== Notable former players ==
=== Football ===
- Graham Arthur (Hawthorn premiership captain)
- Harry Boyle (Carlton player and cricketer for Australia)
- Frank Coghlan (St Kilda footballer)
- Brendan Edwards (Hawthorn Team of the Century member)
- Trevor Keogh (Carlton dual best and fairest and premiership player)
- Bob Makeham (Collingwood premiership player)
- Flynn Perez (current Hawthorn player, formerly with North Melbourne)
- Mark Robinson (retired journalist)
- Adam Selwood (West Coast Eagles premiership player)
- Joel Selwood (Geelong Cats premiership captain and four-time premiership player)
- Scott Selwood (West Coast Eagles and Geelong Cats player)
- Troy Selwood (Brisbane Lions player)
- Michael Sexton (Carlton premiership player)
- Geoff Southby (Carlton Team of the Century member, dual best and fairest and premiership player)
- Fred Swift (Richmond premiership captain) H
- Charlie Edwards (current Adelaide player)
- Brian Walsh (Carlton, Essendon Carlton leading goal kicker 1973)

=== Netball ===
Internationals
Australia
- Rebecca Bulley
