= Eaglehawk Football Club =

Australian rules football and netball club

Eaglehawk

Names
- Full name: Eaglehawk Football & Netball Club
- Nickname(s): Hawks, Two Blues, Borough
- Motto: Win with Honour

2025 season
- After finals: 1st (Premiers)
- Home-and-away season: 2nd
- Leading goalkicker: Jack O'Shannessey (43)
- Best and fairest: Billy Evans

Club details
- Founded: 1880; 146 years ago
- Colours
- Competition: Bendigo Football League
- President: Rani Madden
- Coach: Clayton Holmes & Travis Matheson
- Premierships: BFL (27) 1882, 1883, 1894, 1895, 1896, 1897, 1898, 1900, 1901, 1903, 1906, 1908, 1922, 1924, 1935, 1941, 1946, 1953, 1957, 1968, 1971, 1980, 1982, 2007, 2008, 2018, 2025
- Ground: Canterbury Park Oval, Eaglehawk (capacity: 8,000)

Uniforms
Home

Other information
- Official website: Eaglehawk FNC website

The Eaglehawk Football Netball Club is an Australian rules football and netball club based in the town of Eaglehawk, Victoria and Eaglehawk teams currently compete in the Bendigo Football Netball League (BFNL).

== Club History ==
The Eaglehawk Football Club was formed in 1880 and recruited most of its players from the gold mines in and around Eaglehawk.

Canterbury Park was crown land set aside by the Eaglehawk Borough Council for the purpose of a sports ground and gardens and in November 1872, the Eaglehawk Cricket Club requested to the council that the land at Canterbury Park be levelled "to suit it for cricket purposes". Canterbury Park has always been the home of the "Hawks" or the "Two Blues" ever since the club was established way back in 1880.

Bendigo FC won the 1886 and 1887 premierships and not Eaglehawk as previously recorded on this page. Sandhurst FC were undefeated premiers in 1889 and not Eaglehawk FC as previously recorded on this page. Eaglehawk FC won the 1900 premiership and not South Bendigo as previously recorded on this page.

Eaglehawk has competed in every Bendigo Football League season since the league began in 1880, with the exception of 1904 when the Eaglehawk FC players wished to join the new Eaglehawk District Football Association and the committee supported this move. The 1904 Eaglehawk DFA premiers were Job's Gully FC. Interestingly, in September 1904, the Eaglehawk District FA: 6.11 - 47 defeated Footscray: 7.3 - 45.

Eaglehawk re-joined the Bendigo Football Association in 1905.

Between 1882 and 1908, Eaglehawk won a staggering 12 premierships and between 1892 and 1903, Eaglehawk either finished as Premiers or runners up for 12 consecutive years.

There were new football clubrooms built in 1961 at a cost of £2000 and were named the "W. R. Bill Crawford - Pavilion" after long-serving club president as Crawford was the driving force behind the construction of the new state of the art building.

Former player from the 1890's John Scaddan, went onto become the youngest ever Premier of Western Australia in 1911, at 35 years of age.

From 1936 until 1978 Canterbury Park hosted greyhound racing in Bendigo.

Former Eaglehawk player, Sam Irwin-Hill went onto have a career with the Dallas Cowboys and other NFL clubs as an American football punter.

== Football Premierships ==
Senior Football

Between 1880 and 1903, the team on top of the ladder at the end of the home and away series of matches were crowned Premiers, therefore no official Bendigo Football Association Grand Finals were played prior to 1904.

In 1915, the season was abandoned in late July, 1915 due to World War One. No official premiership was awarded, but Rochester were on top of the ladder, with Eaglehawk, second.

As of 2025, the Eaglehawk seniors have won 27 premierships and have also been runners up on 26 occasions too.

Eaglehawk FNC: Grand Final Results
Year	Premiers	Score	Runners up	Score	Best on Ground	Captain	Coach	Venue	Comments
1882	1st: Eaglehawk		2nd:			Charlie Leggo			
1883	1st: Eaglehawk		2nd:						
1892	1st: Bendigo		2nd: Eaglehawk						
1893	1st: Sandhurst		2nd: Eaglehawk						
1894	1st: Eaglehawk		2nd: South Bendigo			E Hummell			Undefeated Premiers
1895	1st: Eaglehawk		2nd: South Bendigo						
1896	1st: Eaglehawk		2nd: South Bendigo						
1897	1st: Eaglehawk		2nd: South Bendigo						
1898	1st: Eaglehawk		2nd: South Bendigo						
1899	1st: South Bendigo		2nd: Eaglehawk						
1900	1st: Eaglehawk		2nd: South Bendigo			George Cairns			
1901	1st: Eaglehawk		2nd: South Bendigo			George Cairns			
1902	1st: South Bendigo		2nd: Eaglehawk						
1903	1st: Eaglehawk		2nd:						.
1906	Eaglehawk	8.9 - 57	West Bendigo	1.7 - 13				Canterbury Park	
1907	Long Gully	3.3 - 21	Eaglehawk	1.7 - 12					
1908	Eaglehawk	7.5 - 47	Long Gully	4.7 - 31				Upper Reserve	
1909	South Bendigo	7.9 - 51	Eaglehawk	3.2 - 20					
1911	South Bendigo	7.12 - 54	Eaglehawk	2.6 - 18					
1914	South Bendigo	5.10 - 40	Eaglehawk	4.6 - 30					
1915	1st: Rochester		2nd:Eaglehawk						BFL abandoned WW1
1921	South Bendigo	6.15 - 51	Eaglehawk	3.7 - 28					
1922	Eaglehawk	10.16 - 76	Sandhurst	10.11 - 71				Upper Reserve	
1924	Eaglehawk	14.17 - 101	Rochester	8.9 - 57				Upper Reserve	
1930	Sandhurst	17.9 - 111	Eaglehawk	9.9 - 63					Gate: £765
1932	Sandhurst	16.20 - 116	Eaglehawk	7.9 - 51					£347
1935	Eaglehawk	11.15 - 81	Sandhurst	7.17 - 59		Eric Fleming	Eric Fleming		
1938	Golden Square	21.13 - 139	Eaglehawk	14.7 - 91					£441
1941	Eaglehawk	17.10 - 112	South Bendigo	9.14 - 68					
1945	Golden Square	23.20 - 158	Eaglehawk	8.9 - 57					
1946	Eaglehawk	14.10 - 94	Golden Square	13.12 - 90			Harold "Wicky" Toma		£380
1948	Sandhurst	16.24 - 120	Eaglehawk	8.9 - 57					
1951	South Bendigo	24.12 - 156	Eaglehawk	20.8 - 128				QEO	£1130
1953	Eaglehawk	12.13 - 85	Sandhurst	7.12 - 54			Ollie Grieve		
1956	South Bendigo	10.19 - 79	Eaglehawk	9.15 - 69					
1957	Eaglehawk	14.17 - 101	Kyneton	10.11 - 71			Basil Ashman		
1968	Eaglehawk	8.16 - 64	South Bendigo	8.10 - 58			John Ledwidge		
1969	South Bendigo	10.10 - 70	Eaglehawk	9.13 - 67					
1971	Eaglehawk	15.13 - 103	Golden Square	3.10 - 28			John Ledwidge		
1980	Eaglehawk	17.20 - 122	Golden Square	19.6 - 120			Denis Higgins		
1982	Eaglehawk	18.19 - 127	Golden Square	6.12 - 48			Phil Byrne		
1984	Northern United	18.16 - 124	Eaglehawk	12.10 - 82	Ron Best (NU)				
1986	Northern United	19.18 - 132	Eaglehawk	11.9 - 75	Tony Barnes (NU)				
1987	Northern United	23.15 - 153	Eaglehawk	14.7 - 91	Eddie Shield (NU)				
2003	Gisborne	18.12 - 120	Eaglehawk	11.7 - 83	Matt Fitzgerald (G)		Derrick Filo		
2005	Gisborne	14.17 - 101	Eaglehawk	10.10 - 70	Ty Elliott (G)		Derrick Filo		
2007	Eaglehawk	12.12 - 84	Gisborne	12.10 - 82	Rhys Healey (EH)		Derrick Filo		
2008	Eaglehawk	14.11 - 95	Golden Square	12.17 - 89	Damian Lock (EH)		Derrick Filo		
2011	Golden Square	25.18 - 169	Eaglehawk	5.3 - 33	Mark Lloyd (GS)		Luke Monahan	QEO	
2017	Strathfieldsaye	13.10 - 88	Eaglehawk	7.14 - 56	Kallen Geary (STR)		Josh Bowe	QEO	
2018	Eaglehawk	19.8 - 122	Strathfieldsaye	11.7 - 73	Jonty Neaves (EH)		Josh Bowe	QEO	
2019	Strathfieldsaye	14.10 - 94	Eaglehawk	10.20 - 80	Bryce Curnow (STR)			QEO	
2025	Eaglehawk	14.10 - 94	Sandhurst	12.12 - 84	Bailey Ilsley (EH)		Clayton Holmes &	QEO	
							Travis Matheson		
Year	Premiers	Score	Runner Up	Score	Best on Ground	Captain	Coach	Venue	Comments

Reserves (9)

- Bendigo Second Rate Football Association (1928 to 1933)
  - 1930 - Eaglehawk Juniors (Reserves): 12.14 - 86 d Golden City: 9.11 - 65
  - 1932 - Eaglehawk Juniors (Reserves): 14.16 - 100 d Sandhurst Juniors: 8.8 - 56
- Bendigo Football League
  - 1948, 1951, 1953, 1978, 1999, 2003, 2004

Thirds (6)

- 1971, 1972, 1987, 1998, 2003, 2007
- - * 1894: Eaglehawk were undefeated.

== League Best & Fairest Winners ==
Bendigo Football League
Seniors - Jack Michelsen Medal

- 1971 - Greg Kennedy
- 1974 - Allan Williams
- 1978 - Des English
- 2000 - Reece Langan
- 2001 - Lucas Matthews
- 2006 - Kaine Robins
- 2008 - Shannon Milward
- 2010 - Josh Bowe
- 2015 - Brodie Filo
- 2023 - Noah Wheeler

Reserves

- 1958 - Arthur Gilbert
- 1969 - Roy Keene
- 1970 - Roy Keene
- 1972 - Graeme Brown
- 1989 - Andrew Evely
- 1998 - Matt Pollack
- 2001 - Sean Major &
- 2001 - Dwayne Smith
- 2002 - Dwayne Smith
- 2008 - Dwayne Smith
- 2010 - Dwayne Smith
- 2014 - Luke Rundell-Gordon

Thirds

- 1971 - Rod Ashman
- 1972 - Robert Clough
- 1973 - Robert Clough
- 1977 - Derek Burford
- 1978 - Colin Jacobs
- 1996 - Brett Manderson
- 1998 - Scott Tuddenham
- 2006 - Cory Jacobs
- 2007 - Ryan Threlfall
- 2011 - Kevin Archbold

== Leading League Goalkicker ==
Bendigo Football League
Seniors

- 1893 - Joe Mundy 35
- 1894 - Joe Mundy 43
- 1930 - Frank Crapper: 95
- 1932 - Frank Crapper: 129
- 1933 - Frank Crapper: 154 (162)
- 1935 - Mancel Davies: 82
- 1936 - Mancel Davies: 88
- 1938 - Mancel Davies: 86
- 1948 - Harry Morgan: 66
- 1951 - Harry Morgan: 78
- 1952 - Harry Morgan: 66
- 1953 - Harry Morgan: 107 (114)
- 1961 - Merv Hicks: 64
- 1970 - Greg Kennedy: 105 (125)
- 1971 - Greg Kennedy: 139 (152)
- 1972 - Keith Raynor: 69
- 1982 - Daryl Gilmore: 113
- 1984 - Daryl Gilmore: 120
- 1991 - Daryl Gilmore: 92
- 2007 - Damian Brown: 59
- 2015 - Matt Gretgrix: 82
- 2016 - Matt Gretgrix: 90
- ( ) The figures in brackets includes goals kicked in the finals.

Most goals in a match

- 24 - Harry Morgan v Rochester, 1953. Morgan was rested on the bench at 3/4 time too!

== Team of the Century ==
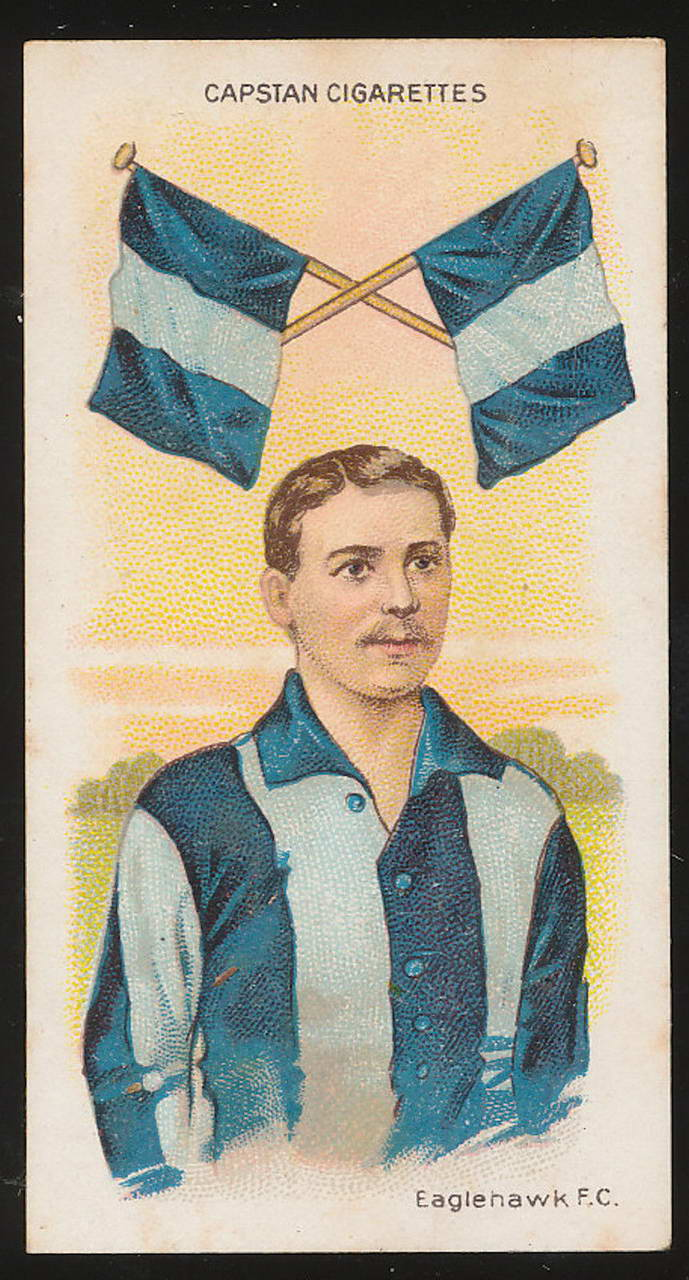
Eaglehawk FC, 1913

The Eaglehawk FNC senior football Team of the Century was announced at the All Seasons Resort Hotel, Bendigo in August 2005 and there were five selectors who eventually settled on the team below.

- Backline: Basil Ashman, Ollie Grieve, Bob Clough
- Half Back: Peter Rogerson, Robert O'Connell, Fred Jinks
- Centre: Jack Slattery, Eddie "Moots" Esposito, Alan Williams
- Half forward: Mancel Davies, George Ilsley, Alf Baud
- Forwardline: Harry Morgan, Greg Kennedy, Rod Ashman
- Ruck: Fred Trewarne
- Ruck Rover: Des English
- Rover: Peter Pianto
- Interchange: Frank Crapper, George Ennor, Steve McDougall, Kevin J Smith, Darren Thompson, George McWilliam
- Coach: John Ledwidge
- Captain: Robert O'Connell
- Vice Captain: Basil Ashman

== VFL / AFL players ==
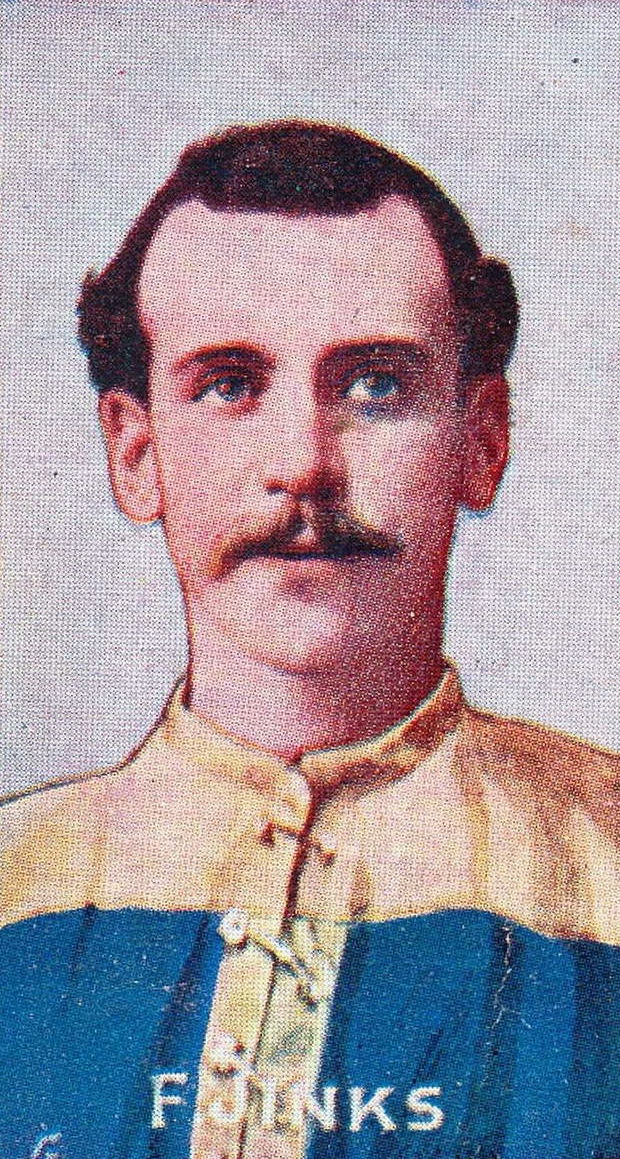
Fred Jinks, 1908

The following footballers played with Eaglehawk prior to playing senior VFL / AFL football, with the year indicating their VFL / AFL debut.

- 1906 - Fred Jinks - Carlton
- 1907 - Charlie Clymo - St Kilda
- 1907 - George McWilliam - Fitzroy
- 1907 - Billy Williams - St Kilda
- 1908 - Fred Forbes - Fitzroy
- 1908 - Harry Hall - St Kilda
- 1909 - George Stewart - Carlton
- 1913 - Alf Baud - Carlton
- 1916 - Tom Wraith - Collingwood
- 1924 - Joe Rowe - Richmond
- 1926 - Les Chapple - Footscray
- 1929 - Bill Downie - Footscray
- 1929 - Ted Esposito - Melbourne
- 1929 - Jack King - Carlton
- 1929 - Claude Rowe - North Melbourne
- 1929 - Neal Thompson - North Melbourne
- 1930 - Ron James - Footscray
- 1931 - Frank Crapper - North Melbourne
- 1935 - Reg Collier - Footscray
- 1935 - Eddie Gray - Collingwood
- 1936 - Fred Crapper - Richmond
- 1936 - Almond Richards - Essendon
- 1939 - Kevin O'Halloran - St Kilda
- 1940 - Ian Chinn - South Melbourne
- 1942 - Arthur Cairns - St Kilda
- 1942 - Harold Daly - Hawthorn
- 1947 - Russ Robinson - Melbourne
- 1951 - Alan Daly - Melbourne
- 1951 - Peter Pianto - Geelong
- 1952 - Doug Palmer - Geelong
- 1954 - George Ilsley - Carlton
- 1955 - Clive Brown - Geelong
- 1955 - Kevin J. Smith - Footscray
- 1956 - Bill Evely - Richmond
- 1957 - Max Hetherington - Geelong
- 1957 - Denis Strauch - Carlton
- 1958 - Mal Smith - South Melbourne
- 1959 - Hugh Routley - Geelong
- 1959 - Jack Slattery - Footscray
- 1962 - Ike Ilsley - St Kilda
- 1963 - Peter Lyon - Hawthorn
- 1972 - Greg Kennedy - Carlton
- 1973 - Rod Ashman - Carlton
- 1980 - Des English Carlton
- 1982 - Chris Waterson - Essendon
- 1983 - Daryl Gilmore - Carlton
- 1998 - Damien Lock - Carlton
- 2008 - Jarryn Geary St Kilda
- 2013 - Jake Stringer - Footscray

The following footballers played VFL / AFL senior football prior to playing with Eaglehawk FC, with the year indicating his debut with Eaglehawk FC.

- 1925 - Percy Martyn - Essendon
- 1932 - Norm Sexton - Footscray
- 1935 - Eric Fleming - Geelong
- 1937 - Jack Anderson - St Kilda
- 1937 - Cairo Dixon - Hawthorn
- 1953 - Ollie Grieve - Carlton
- 1961 - Merv Hicks - Collingwood
- 1966 - Mike Hammond - Richmond
- 1968 - John Ledwidge - South Melbourne
- 1968 - John Lloyd - Carlton
- 1968 - Maurie Young - Hawthorn
- 1969 - Ron Critchley - Hawthorn
- 1969 - Bob Mallett - South Melbourne
- 1969 - Rod Williams - South Melbourne

== Canterbury Park Oval ==
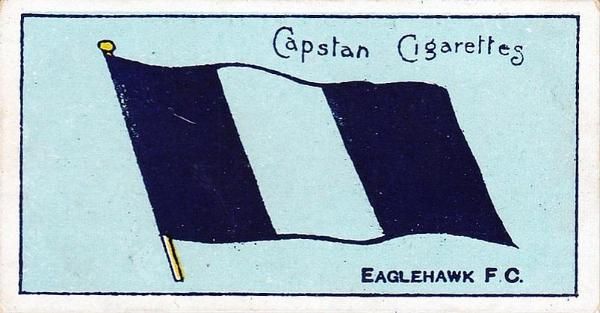
1908 Club Flags: Eaglehawk FC

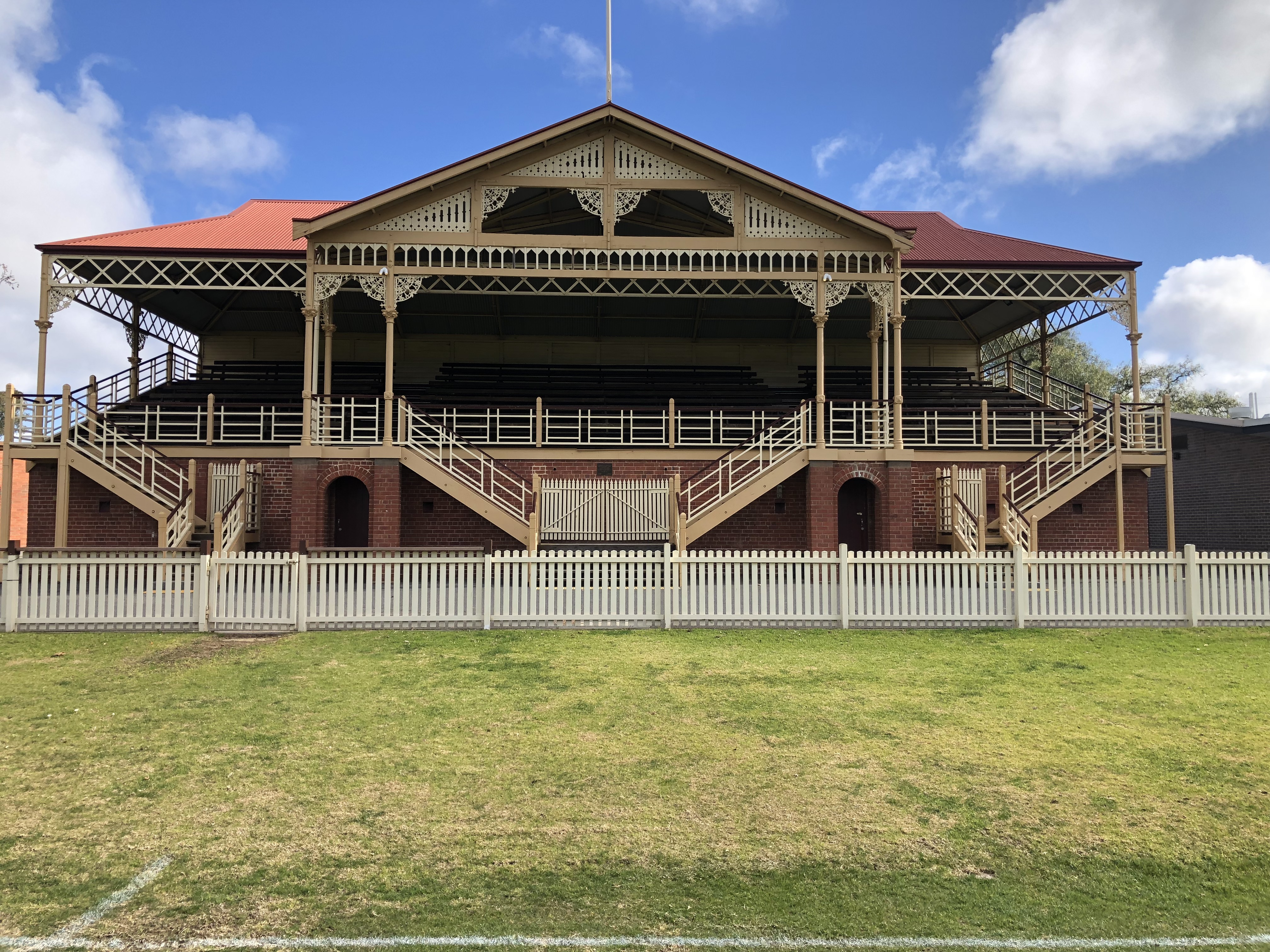
Canterbury Park Oval Grandstand, Eaglehawk

The club's home ground facilities are situated at 2 Simpson Road, Eaglehawk, Bendigo, Victoria.

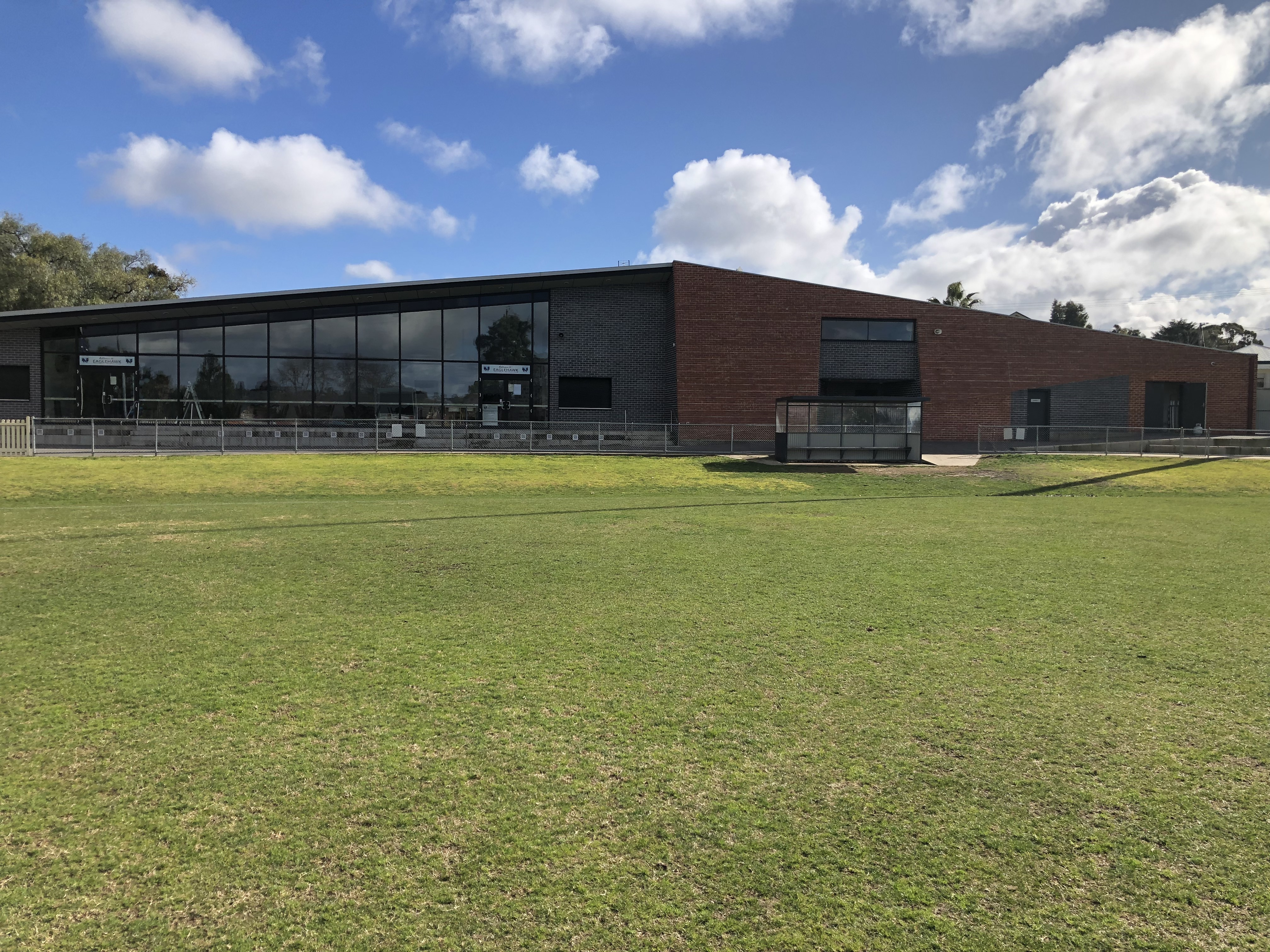
2015 new Eaglehawk FNC clubrooms, which replaced the old Bill Crawford Pavilion, built in 1961.

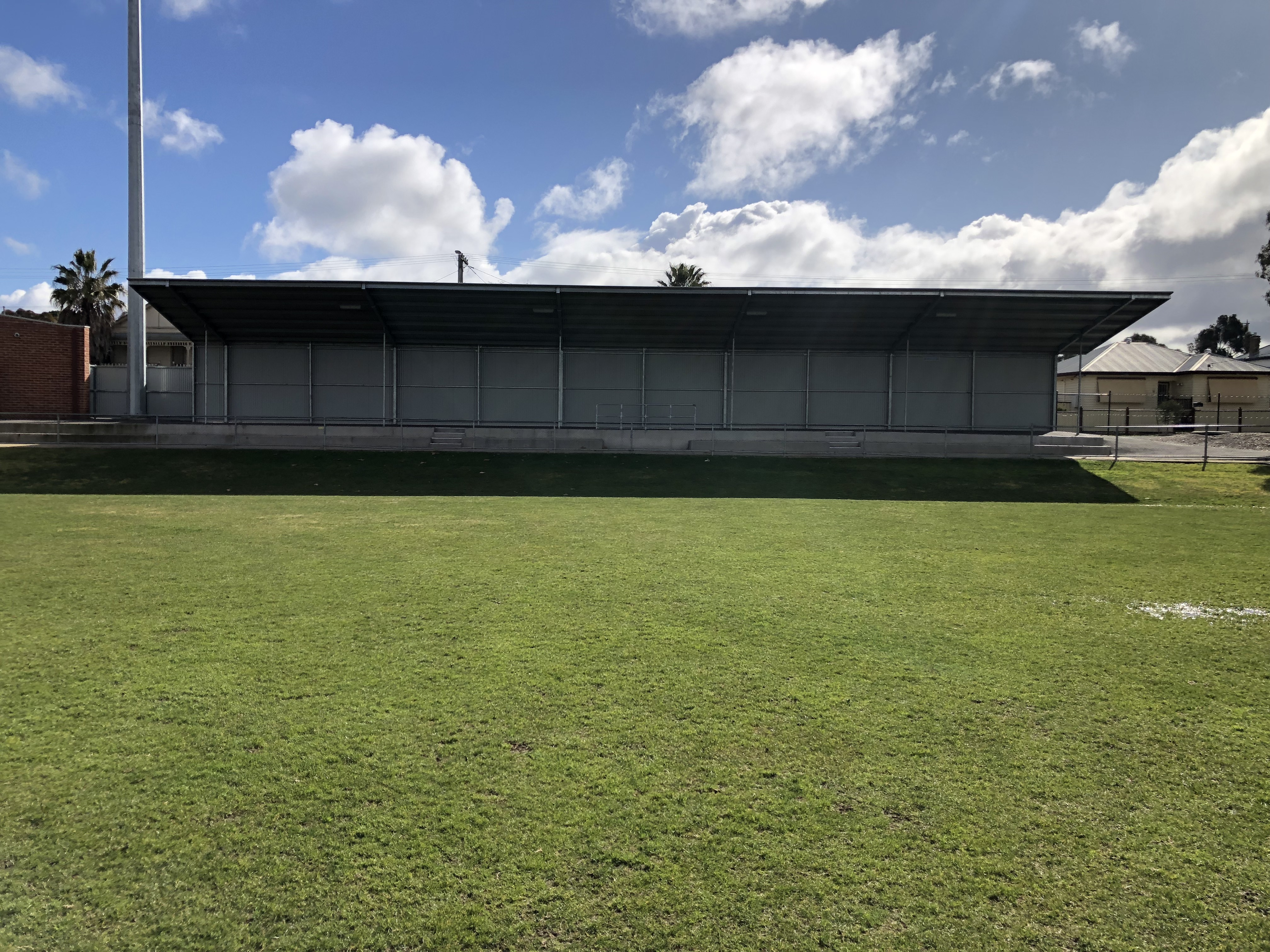
Canterbury Park Oval - All weather shelter
