= Crapper =

Crapper is slang term for a toilet.

It may also refer to:

- Caganer (transl. "the crapper"), a figurine depicted in the act of defecation appearing in nativity scenes in Catalonia
- Frank Crapper (1911–1991), Australian footballer
- Fred Crapper (1909–1976), Australian footballer
- Harry Crapper (1905–1976), Australian footballer
- Thomas Crapper (1836–1910), British plumber
