= Neil Thomson =

Neil Thomson may refer to:

- Neil Thomson (conductor)
- Neil Thomson (politician)

== See also ==
- Neil Thompson, English footballer
- Neil Thompson (cricketer)
- Neal Thompson (disambiguation)
