= John Slattery (disambiguation) =

John Slattery (born 1962) is an American actor and director.

John Slattery may also refer to:

- John Henry Slattery (died 1933), American politician from Colorado
- John P. Slattery (born 1958), American politician from Massachusetts
- John R. Slattery (1851–1926), co-founder of the Josephites, a Catholic religious community serving African Americans
- John Rodolph Slattery (1877–1932), general manager for the Interborough Rapid Transit Company in New York City
- John Slattery, host of the radio show Gascony Show
- Jack Slattery (John Terrence Slattery, 1878–1949), American baseball player
- Jack Slattery (footballer) (born as Edward John Slattery in 1937), Australian rules footballer
