= McWilliam =

McWilliam is a surname. Notable people with the surname include:

- Candia McWilliam (born 1955), Scottish writer
- Colin McWilliam (1928–1989), Scottish academic and writer
- F. E. McWilliam (1909–1992), British sculptor
- George McWilliam (1878–1968), Australian rules footballer
- George Roy McWilliam (1905–1977), Canadian politician
- James Ormiston McWilliam (1808–1862), Scottish naval surgeon, physician, and writer
- John McWilliam (1941–2009), Scottish politician
- Michael McWilliam (born 1933), British banker, academic administrator, and historian
- Peter McWilliam (1879–1951), Scottish footballer
- Richard McWilliam (1953–2013), American businessman
