= Almond Richards =

Australian rules footballer, born 1911

Personal information
- Full name: Almond Thomas Richards
- Born: 3 April 1911; Tatura, Victoria
- Died: 27 November 1992 (aged 81); Eaglehawk, Victoria
- Original team: Eaglehawk
- Height: 179 cm (5 ft 10 in)
- Weight: 84 kg (185 lb)

Playing career^{1}
Years	Club	Games (Goals)
1936	Essendon	4 (0)
- ^{1} Playing statistics correct to the end of 1936.

Almond Thomas Richards (3 April 1911 – 27 November 1992) was an Australian rules footballer who played for the Essendon Football Club in the Victorian Football League (VFL).

He was recruited from Eaglehawk Football Club in the Bendigo Football League.

== Career ==
Richards joined the Essendon Football Club in 1936 and played four games during that season without scoring any goals.

Despite the brevity of his career in the top league, his participation with Essendon was considered a notable achievement, as moving from regional Victorian competitions to the VFL at that time was uncommon and required considerable talent.
