= Eric Fleming (footballer) =

Australian rules footballer (1903–1984)

Personal information
- Full name: Eric James Edward Fleming
- Born: 16 March 1903; Carlton, Victoria
- Died: 20 August 1984 (aged 81); Melbourne, Victoria
- Original team: South Bendigo
- Height: 191 cm (6 ft 3 in)
- Weight: 81 kg (179 lb)

Playing career^{1}
| Years | Club | Games (Goals) |
| 1921 | South Bendigo (BFL) | |
| 1922–1928 | Geelong (VFL) | 105 (112) |
| 1929–1934 | Oakleigh (VFA) | 103 (117) |
| 1935–1936 | Eaglehawk (BFL) | |
| 1937–1939 | General Motors-Holdens (SMFL) | |

Coaching career
| Years | Club | Games (W–L–D) |
| 1933 | Oakleigh (VFA) | |
| 1935–1936 | Eaglehawk (BFL) | |
- ^{1} Playing statistics correct to the end of 1934.

Career highlights
- BFL Representative Team: 1921; VFL premiership: 1925; Geelong Semi-Final Team: 1923, 1926, 1927; Geelong Grand Final Team: 1925; VFL Representative Team: 1925; VFA premiership: 1930, 1931; Oakleigh Grand Final Team: 1930, 1931; VFA Representative Team: 1931; BFL premiership: 1935; Eaglehawk Semi-Final Team: 1935, 1936; Eaglehawk Preliminary-Final Team: 1935, 1936; Eaglehawk Grand-Final Team: 1935; SMFL premiership: 1938; General Motors-Holdens Grand-Final Team: 1937, 1938, 1939

Eric James Edward Fleming (16 March 1903 – 20 August 1984) was an Australian rules footballer who played for the Geelong Football Club in the Victorian Football League (VFL), and for the Oakleigh Football Club in the Victorian Football Association (VFA).

== Family ==
The son of Edward Reardon Fleming (1864–1931), and Mabel Hilda Fleming (1879–1967), née Propsting, Eric James Edward Fleming was born at Melbourne on 16 March 1903.

He married Coral Myrtle Frood (1909–2000) in 1928.

== Football ==
=== South Bendigo (BFL) ===
While attending school, he played with the South Bendigo Football Club in the Bendigo Football League (BFL) in 1921. He was one of the best players in a BFL representative team that played against a VFL representative team at Bendigo on 6 August 1921.

=== Geelong (VFL) ===
Eric Fleming was a tall, high marking ruckman who notably had an exceptional torpedo punt. He could also play at half forward and averaged over a goal a game in his career.

Cleared from South Bendigo to Geelong on 10 May 1922, he was a member of Geelong's 1925 premiership side.

=== VFL representative ===
In 1925, he was selected in the VFL representative side, as second-ruck, to play against South Australia, in Adelaide, on 4 July 1925. He scored a goal in a match that South Australia won by 3 points: 11.11 (77) to 11.8 (74).

=== 12 July 1924 ===
Fleming was involved in a controversial incident during Geelong's 12 July 1924 match against Fitzroy, at the Corio Oval. With Geelong trailing by 3 points, Fleming took a mark near goal just before the final siren sounded. As Fleming prepared to take his place-kick, no fewer than 11 Fitzroy players — many of whom were of the strong opinion that Fleming had not taken a clean mark — stood on the mark, along with several of the Fitzroy trainers, waving their towels, and a number of Fitzroy supporters who had come on to the field. Fleming's kick was not a good one, and was touched by some of the assembled pack.

The umpire, Jack Scott, gave Fleming a second chance. Fleming kicked the goal (again from a place-kick) and Geelong won the match 9.14 (68) to 9.11 (65). Because of the Fitzroy players’ interference while Fleming was in the process of making his second kick, the umpire had blown his whistle — and, if Fleming's kick had not scored a goal, he would have been allowed to make a third attempt:

"… with 24 minutes of the [final] quarter gone (Gordon) McCracken gave (Bobby) Walker a chance to score for Fitzroy, and he obtained the full six points, putting his side three points in the lead.
From the bounce, the Geelong men, led by (Jim) Mathieson, swept towards the Fitzroy posts. The maroons escaped from a dangerous position in front of their goal, but Mathieson marked a long way out, and with a good kick dropped the ball again in front of the Fitzroy goal
Half a dozen players went up for the hall, but Fleming, of Geelong, marked it, and brought it down. It was then knocked from his hands by one of the excited [Fitzroy] players but the umpire allowed the mark.
No fewer than 11 of the Fitzroy players lined up on the mark to balk Fleming in his attempt to kick a goal. As he ran to kick, some of the Fitzroy players dashed towards him and struck the ball, which did not seem to be going from his boot in the right direction in any case.
The umpire gave Fleming another shot.
He still had to face 11 Fitzroy men, dancing on the mark, and a few civilians, because the final bell had rung and many excited partisans and even club officials had flocked into the arena.
Fleming's second kick went through the posts amidst a scene of wild excitement. Geelong footballers rushed Fleming and carried him off the ground to the dressingroom.
If he had not scored a goal with his second shot [Fleming] would have been allowed a third kick because several Fitzroy players again ran between him and the dancing row when he was in the act of kicking, and the umpire blew his whistle to indicate that Fleming had been interfered with. As the goal [had been] scored the third kick was not claimed.
It was a very trying time for all concerned. The strain must have been great on Fleming's nerves, and the umpire showed a firmness that merited high commendation. It was very disappointing for the Fitzroy men to have a three-point victory for them converted into a three-point defeat by the last kick of the day." — The Age, 14 July 1924.

==== Laws of the game ====
A change in the laws of the game was made before the 1925 season, as a consequence of this incident, such that only one defending player was allowed to stand on the mark.

=== Oakleigh (VFA) ===
He joined VFA club Oakleigh, without a clearance, in 1929.

He played for Oakleigh in its first-ever VFA match on 20 April 1929, and went on to play in 103 matches over 6 Seasons (1929 to 1934). He played at centre half-forward in their 1930 and 1931 premierships.

=== VFA Representative ===
On 6 June 1931, selected as a replacement for the injured Brighton player, George Hunt, he represented the VFA in a one-sided match, played in atrocious conditions, against the VFL at the MCG — he scored one of the VFA's three goals: VFL 12.17 (89) to VFA 3.10 (28).

=== Eaglehawk (BFL) ===
On 17 April 1935 he was granted a clearance to the Eaglehawk Football Club in the Bendigo Football League, where he had been appointed captain-coach. Eaglehawk won the 1935 BFL premiership.

In March 1936, it was reported that, "Fleming has been reappointed at Eaglehawk, but will return to Oakleigh if employment can be found for him"; and, on 30 March 1936, he played for Oakleigh in a pre-season match against North Melbourne. He returned to Eaglehawk, and was captain-coach for the entire 1936. Eaglehawk lost the 1936 BFL Preliminary Final to the Kyneton Football Club, coached by ex-Footscray player Bill Spurling: 11.18 (84) to 22.14 (146).

=== General Motors-Holdens (SMFL) ===
On 4 May 1937 the Saturday Morning Football League registered Fleming, along with ex-South Melbourne Jack Graham, ex-Sturt and Carlton Keith Dunn, to play with the General Motors-Holdens' football team that was coached by Austin Robertson.

He was still at play in 1939.

== Death ==
He died at Melbourne, Victoria on 20 August 1984.
