= Kevin O'Donnell =

Kevin O'Donnell may refer to:

- Kevin O'Donnell (Peace Corps) (1925-2012), American who served as director of the Peace Corps
- Kevin O'Donnell Jr. (1950-2012), American science fiction writer, son of Peace Corps director
- Kevin O'Donnell (footballer) (1924-2002), Australian rules footballer for St Kilda
