= Tom Wraith =

Australian rules footballer and umpire

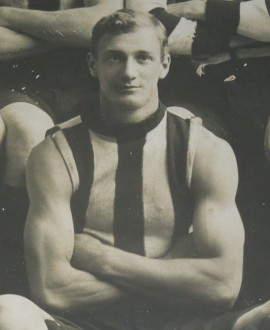
- Wraith in 1919

Personal information
- Full name: Thomas Watson Wraith
- Born: 20 March 1890; Eaglehawk, Victoria
- Died: 5 December 1970 (aged 80); Castlemaine, Victoria
- Original team: Eaglehawk
- Height: 175 cm (5 ft 9 in)
- Weight: 72 kg (159 lb)
- Position: Forward

Playing career^{1}
Years	Club	Games (Goals)	
1916–1920	Collingwood	60 (88)	

Umpiring career
Years	League	Role	Games
1923–1930	VFL	Field umpire	135 VCFL
- ^{1} Playing statistics correct to the end of 1920.

Thomas Watson Wraith (20 March 1890 – 5 December 1970) was an Australian rules footballer and umpire who played with Collingwood in the Victorian Football League (VFL).

== Playing career ==
Born in Eaglehawk, Wraith began with Eaglehawk Juniors before moving to the senior Eaglehawk team in the Bendigo Football League in 1911. He made an immediate impression on the forward line coming second in the club goal-kicking for the season.

The following year he led Eaglehawk's goal-kicking with 21 but Eaglehawk lost the semi-final to California Gully by two points. That Wraith was well held on the day was crucial to Gully's success.

Despite both club and personal good form in 1913 Eaglehawk and Wraith fell short of the final again, this time being knocked out by South Bendigo, Wraith kicking two of his side's five goals in the semi-final loss.

In 1914 Wraith transferred to Castlemaine Foundry in the Castlemaine Football League. Foundry had recruited well but Wraith was the key given his marking and goal scoring ability. He played well early but crushed his hand prior to playing Kyneton and was out for one match. It seemed to have little effect as he kicked four goals on his return the following week.

Foundry went on to play in the finals but without Wraith who was suspended for the season after being found guilty of striking with the elbow against Daylesford.

Injured in a willing match 1915, he missed a week but was Foundry's focal point up forward before they bowed out in the second semi-final.

Wraith was cleared to Collingwood for the 1916 VFL season and goaled twice on debut against Richmond. Collingwood had Dick Lee as its full-forward during this period and while Wraith scored regularly he played second-fiddle to Lee. Never more so than after the 1917 final when he was omitted from the following week's grand final for an injury-suspect Lee. This despite kicking a goal and "shining in the forward line".

Nevertheless, the following year he topped Collingwood's goal-kicking with 26 won a place in their grand final side.

During 1919 he had his best return kicking six goals against Melbourne in round 15 which coincided with his 50th VFL match. It was also his best goal-kicking year with 30 but he came second to the prolific Lee.

Aged 30, Wraith began to become the victim of minor injuries which plagued his last year. He played only four matches before being carried from the ground at Victoria Park in round 11 with a pulled leg muscle. He returned for one more VFL match, kicking three goal against St Kilda in round 15 although he did appear in a number of matches during Collingwood's October tour to Adelaide and the practice matches in 1921 before leaving the club.

His VFL playing career stood at 66 matches and 80 goals over five seasons.

In 1921 Wraith moved to Northcote in the Victorian Football Association (VFA) and contributed few goals and played again in 1922 when his application for the coaching job at Frankston was unsuccessful. With his best days behind him, he contributed little to Northcote's seventh-place finish and retired at the end of the season.

== Umpiring career ==
Following his retirement from playing Wraith applied for and won a place on the VFL list of field umpires. For the next eight years he umpired all over Victoria in almost all the country competitions to which the VFL provided umpires. He did not umpire any senior VFL matches.

Wraith was immediately successful being appointed to the North Western Football Association grand final in his first season. Certainly the Frankston press were impressed with one of his early matches noting his football pedigree and that he "kept the game opened out". That same year he suffered from the bane of many country umpires – the late start. In a match at Rushworth the sides appeared very late to begin play and Wraith missed the last Melbourne train and had to stay overnight.

In his first five seasons Wraith was appointed to six other grand finals: 1924 Lowan Football Association, 1925 Mansfield and District Football Association and Kiewa and District Football League and the 1926 and 1927 Faithful and District Football League.

Between 1923 and his retirement in 1930 Wraith umpired 135 VCFL matches.
