= Frank Crapper =

Australian rules footballer

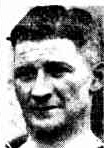

Personal information
- Full name: Francis Gerald Crapper
- Born: 22 May 1911; Raywood, Victoria
- Died: 8 February 1991 (aged 79)
- Original team: Eaglehawk
- Height: 183 cm (6 ft 0 in)
- Weight: 80 kg (176 lb)

Playing career^{1}
Years	Club	Games (Goals)
1931, 1935–1939	North Melbourne	27 (56)
- ^{1} Playing statistics correct to the end of 1939.

Francis Gerald Crapper (22 May 1911 – 8 February 1991) was an Australian rules footballer who played with North Melbourne in the Victorian Football League (VFL).

Crapper was a prolific full-forward for Eaglehawk in the Bendigo Football League (BFL), who had two stints at North Melbourne. Two brothers, Fred and Harry, played briefly at Richmond and Melbourne respectively.

He had come to the attention of North Melbourne scouts in 1930 when he became the first player in history to kick over 100 goals in a BFL season. Crapper was then signed by North Melbourne but would only play three games for them in 1931 before returning to Eaglehawk.

Crapper beat his own BFL record in 1932 when he kicked 129 goals. He bettered that effort in 1933 with 154 goals in the home and away season and 165 after finals. Both those tallies remain a league record.

The forward made a return to North Melbourne in 1935 and kicked 10 goals from his six appearances. He finally kicked a big haul for his VFL club in the sixth round of the 1936 season, with nine goals against St Kilda. His eventual season tall of 29 goals was second only to Dudley Cassidy at North Melbourne. Over the next three years he managed only five more games but did put in another memorable performance, kicking eight goals against Footscray on his 26th birthday. Despite his efforts he still finished on the losing team, as he had after his nine-goal haul from the previous season.

Crapper served in the second World War.
