= Kevin O'Halloran (Australian rules footballer) =

Australian rules footballer, born 1915

Personal information
- Full name: Kevin Frank O'Halloran
- Born: 17 January 1915; Raywood, Victoria
- Died: 6 October 1976 (aged 61); Footscray, Victoria
- Original team: Eaglehawk (Bendigo FL)
- Height: 193 cm (6 ft 4 in)
- Weight: 102 kg (225 lb)

Playing career^{1}
Years	Club	Games (Goals)
1939	St Kilda	7 (18)
1940	South Melbourne	2 (3)
1941	Footscray	5 (3)
Total		14 (24)
- ^{1} Playing statistics correct to the end of 1941.

Kevin Frank O'Halloran (17 January 1915 – 6 October 1976) was an Australian rules footballer who played with St Kilda, South Melbourne and Footscray in the Victorian Football League (VFL).

== Family ==
The son of Simon Patrick O'Halloran (1874-1949), an Barbara Lee Goldsmith (1876-1922), Kevin Francis O'Halloran was born on 17 January 1915.

He married Ida Jean Crawford (1916-1989)in 1940.

His son, Eddie, played with Footscray during the early 1960s.

== Football ==
O'Halloran was a follower, originally from Eaglehawk in the Bendigo Football League. Over the next two seasons he had the unusual distinction of playing for four clubs.

=== St Kilda (VFL) ===
He kicked a league equaling record seven goals on his VFL debut, against Footscray at Western Oval.

=== South Melbourne (VFL) ===
He was at South Melbourne in 1940.

=== Yarraville (VFA) ===
He joined Yarraville in 1940.

=== Footscray (VFL) ===
Although he was not cleared from Yarraville, the VFL Permit Committee granted him a permit to play with the VFL team Footscray on 18 June 1941.

== Death ==
He died at his residence in Footscray, Victoria on 6 October 1976.
