= Neal Thompson =

Neal Thompson may refer to:

- Neal Thompson (writer)
- Neal Thompson (footballer)

== See also ==
- Neil Thompson, English footballer
- Neil Thompson (cricketer)
- Neil Thomson (disambiguation)
