= Joe Rowe =

Joe Rowe may refer to:

- Joe Rowe (American football) (born 1973), American football player
- Joe Rowe (Australian footballer) (1901–1968), Australian rules football player
