= George Ilsley =

Australian rules footballer

Personal information
- Full name: George Ernest Henry Ilsley
- Born: 14 March 1932; Koondrook, Victoria
- Died: 8 April 2016 (aged 84); Eaglehawk, Victoria
- Original team: Eaglehawk FC
- Height: 174 cm (5 ft 9 in)
- Weight: 80 kg (176 lb)

Playing career^{1}
Years	Club	Games (Goals)
1954	Carlton	2 (1)
- ^{1} Playing statistics correct to the end of 1954.

George Ernest Ilsley (14 March 1932 – 8 April 2016) was an Australian rules footballer who played with Carlton in the Victorian Football League (VFL), Eaglehawk Football Club in the Bendigo Football League and Northern United in the Golden City Football League.

Ilsley played over 350 games for the Eaglehawk Football Club and also coached them. He was a Life member and Hall of Fame member of both Eaglehawk and the Bendigo Football League. He was named as centre half-forward in Eaglehawk's team of the century and the Eaglehawk best and fairest award is named the George Ilsley Medal.
