= Deniliquin Football Club =

Deniliquin

Names
- Full name: Deniliquin Football & Netball Club
- Nickname: Rams

2024 season
- After finals: 4th
- Home-and-away season: 4th
- Leading goalkicker: Sam Lloyd (33)

Club details
- Founded: 1933; 93 years ago
- Colours
- Competition: Murray FNL
- Premierships: (17): 1933, 1934, 1925, 1957, 1966, 1972, 1973, 1975, 1976, 1985, 1986, 1996, 2001, 2002, 2003, 2004, 2011

Uniforms
Home

The Deniliquin Football & Netball Club, nicknamed the Rams, is an Australian rules football and netball club based in the town of Deniliquin located in the Riverina district of New South Wales.

The club's teams currently compete in the Murray FNL, which the Deniliquin football club joined in 1949.

== History ==
Football appears to have been played in and around Deniliquin as early as the 1870s, but today's Deniliquin FC was born some six decades later, in 1933.

In early July, 1892, two football clubs were established in Deniliquin, one called the Imperials, of North Deniliquin and the South Deniliquin Football Club.

The first recorded match was in late July, 1892 was between South Deniliquin: 2.6 – 18 defeating Imperials: 1.8 – 14.

In 1893, Deniliquin FC played a match against Echuca and was played on the Park Oval, with Echuca thrashing Deniliquin.

In 1894, the Deniliquin Juniors played a match against the Echuca Railway Juniors, on the Park Oval, Echuca.

In 1895, Deniliquin were runners up for the Gillespie Cup to the Trades FC.

In 1899, three football club's were formed in Deniliquin.

In 1900, the Deniliquin Football Association was established.

In 1901, the Deniliquin footballers, under the name of the Commonwealth Football Club won the premiership and received premiership medals from Mr. John Moore Chanter, MHR.

The Deniliquin Football Association ran from 1900 to 1932, with usually three clubs from within the town of Deniliquin playing in this competition on a regular basis up until 1932.

In 1933, the Deniliquin Football Club was formed and were admitted into the Echuca Football League, with Norm Sexton as coach.

Bill Downie was captain-coach of the Deniliquin in the Echuca Football League in 1934 and 1935. Deniliquin won the Echuca Football League premiership in both years: 1934, and 1935.

In 1949, Deniliquin joined the Murray Football League.

== Football Premierships ==
Seniors

- Echuca Football League (3):
  - 1933, 1934, 1935
- Murray Football League (14):
  - 1957, 1966, 1972, 1973, 1975, 1976, 1985, 1986, 1996, 2001, 2002, 2003, 2004, 2011

Reserves

- Murray Valley Second Eighteen Football Association
  - 1954
- Murray Football League
  - 1962, 1967, 1972, 1973, 1975, 1978, 1979, 1985, 1993, 1996, 2001,

== VFL / AFL players ==
A small number of former Deniliquin players have gone on to play in the Victorian and Australian Football Leagues (VFL and AFL), including:

- 1953 – Ian Egerton – Hawthorn
- 1953 – Bob Henderson – Fitzroy
- 1963 – Peter Lyon – Hawthorn
- 1982 – Simon O'Donnell – St. Kilda
- 1991 – Peter McIntyre – Adelaide Crows
- 1995 – Leo Barry – Sydney Swans
- 2014 – Sam Lloyd – Richmond & Western Bulldogs
- 2017 – Todd Marshall – Port Adelaide

Additionally, former VFL footballers to have played / coached Deniliquin in the following year(s)include –

- 1933 – Norm Sexton – Carlton & Footscray
- 1934 - Bill Downie - Footscray & St. Kilda
- 1947 – Phil Nagle – Richmond
- 1950 – Kevin O'Donnell – St. Kilda
- 1953 – Keith Schaefer – South Melbourne
- 1955 – Peter O'Donohue – Hawthorn
- 1966 – Graham Ion – Footscray
