= Roy Franklin =

Australian rules footballer

Personal information
- Full name: Horace Roy Franklin
- Born: 25 December 1892; Eaglehawk, Victoria
- Died: 25 July 1950 (aged 57); Heidelberg, Victoria
- Original team: Collingwood District

Playing career^{1}
Years	Club	Games (Goals)
1915	Melbourne	6 (1)
- ^{1} Playing statistics correct to the end of 1915.

Roy Franklin (25 December 1892 – 25 July 1950) was an Australian rules footballer who played with Melbourne in the Victorian Football League (VFL).

He married Margaret Jean Hunter in 1916 and was a printer/machinist around that time. Later in life he became a real estate agent.

Franklin was also a member of a Masonic Lodge at Greensborough, Melbourne.
