= James O'Donnell (footballer) =

Australian rules footballer

Personal information
- Full name: James O'Donnell
- Born: 31 August 2002 (age 24)
- Original team: Kew Football Club
- Draft: 2022, Category B Rookie
- Debut: Round 9, 2023, Western Bulldogs vs. Carlton, at Marvel Stadium
- Height: 197 cm (6 ft 6 in)
- Weight: 88 kg (194 lb)
- Position: Key defender

Club information
- Current club: Western Bulldogs
- Number: 18

Playing career^{1}
Years	Club	Games (Goals)
2023–	Western Bulldogs	65 (7)
- ^{1} Playing statistics correct to the end of round 22, 2026.

Career highlights
- Chris Grant Best First Year Player (2023)

James O'Donnell (born 31 August 2002) is a professional Australian rules footballer playing for the Western Bulldogs in the Australian Football League (AFL). He was signed as a Category B rookie in the 2022 AFL draft after playing cricket for Essendon Cricket Club. O'Donnell is son of Simon O'Donnell, a former cricketer and VFL footballer.

== Early life ==
O'Donnell played Australian Rules Football for Kew Football Club as well as School football for Xavier College in which he attended his schooling education. After completing high school he originally decided to play cricket like his father Simon playing his cricket for Essendon Cricket Club.

== AFL career ==
O'Donnell debuted for the Western Bulldogs in Round 9, 2023 AFL Season against Carlton at Marvel Stadium in which the Bulldogs defeated Carlton by 20 points. He was awarded the Bulldogs' Best First Year player.

== Statistics ==
Updated to the end of round 22, 2026.

Legend
G	Goals	K	Kicks	D	Disposals	T	Tackles
B	Behinds	H	Handballs	M	Marks

Season	Team	No.	Games	Totals							Averages (per game)							Votes
Season	Team	No.	Games	G	B	K	H	D	M	T	G	B	K	H	D	M	T	Votes
2023	Western Bulldogs	18	12	1	2	60	39	99	34	9	0.1	0.2	5.0	3.3	8.3	2.8	0.8	0
2024	Western Bulldogs	18	14	2	1	115	42	157	62	14	0.1	0.1	8.2	3.0	11.2	4.4	1.0	0
2025	Western Bulldogs	18	22	4	2	154	75	229	90	30	0.2	0.1	7.0	3.4	10.4	4.1	1.4	0
2026	Western Bulldogs	18	17	0	0	122	53	175	71	21	0.0	0.0	7.2	3.1	10.3	4.2	1.2	0
Career			65	7	5	451	209	660	257	74	0.1	0.1	6.9	3.2	10.2	4.0	1.1	0
