= Bob Henderson (Australian footballer) =

Australian rules footballer

Personal information
- Full name: Robert Henderson
- Born: 27 January 1934
- Died: 8 June 2019 (aged 85)
- Original team: Deniliquin
- Height: 183 cm (6 ft 0 in)
- Weight: 80 kg (176 lb)
- Position: Fullback

Playing career^{1}
Years	Club	Games (Goals)
1953, 1955–62	Fitzroy	137 (1)
- ^{1} Playing statistics correct to the end of 1962.

Robert Henderson (27 January 1934 – 8 June 2019) was an Australian rules footballer who played with Fitzroy in the Victorian Football League (VFL). Originally from Deniliquin, New South Wales Henderson made 137 appearances for Fitzroy, from 1953 to 1962.

He coached Sunshine in the Victorian Football Association after leaving Fitzroy. In 1963, his first season, Sunshine went from second last the previous year to the semi-finals. He led Sunshine to the second division grand final in the 1964 VFA season, which they lost to Geelong West. He coached Sunshine for five seasons from 1963 until 1967.
