= Harold Daly =

Australian rules footballer, born 1915

Personal information
- Full name: Harold Edward Daly
- Born: 18 October 1915
- Died: 27 April 1995 (aged 79)
- Original team: Eaglehawk (Bendigo FL)
- Height: 173 cm (5 ft 8 in)
- Weight: 77 kg (170 lb)

Playing career^{1}
Years	Club	Games (Goals)
1942	Hawthorn	5 (0)
1944	North Melbourne	2 (0)
1945–1946	St Kilda	5 (0)
Total		12 (0)
- ^{1} Playing statistics correct to the end of 1946.

Harold Edward Daly (18 October 1915 – 27 April 1995) was an Australian rules footballer who played with Hawthorn, North Melbourne and St Kilda in the Victorian Football League (VFL). In a brief league career, which saw him play for three clubs, Daly never once played in a winning team. He originally arrived at Hawthorn from Eaglehawk. A brother, Alan Daly, later played with Melbourne.
