= Russ Robinson (footballer) =

Australian rules footballer

Personal information
- Full name: Lindsay Russell Robinson
- Born: 19 November 1928; Wandiligong, Victoria
- Died: 25 November 2004 (aged 76); Richmond, Victoria
- Original team: Eaglehawk
- Height: 183 cm (6 ft 0 in)
- Weight: 76 kg (168 lb)

Playing career^{1}
Years	Club	Games (Goals)
1947–48	Melbourne	7 (1)
- ^{1} Playing statistics correct to the end of 1948.

Lindsay Russell Robinson (19 November 1928 – 25 November 2004) was an Australian rules footballer who played with Melbourne in the Victorian Football League (VFL).
