= Rod Williams (Australian footballer) =

Australian rules footballer

Personal information
- Full name: Rod Williams
- Born: 28 April 1948 (age 78)
- Original team: Spotswood Under 18s
- Height: 170 cm (5 ft 7 in)
- Weight: 68 kg (150 lb)

Playing career^{1}
Years	Club	Games (Goals)
1967–68	South Melbourne	3 (1)
- ^{1} Playing statistics correct to the end of 1968.

Rod Williams (born 28 April 1948) is a former Australian rules footballer who played with South Melbourne in the Victorian Football League (VFL).

Following the end of his VFL career, Williams played for Eaglehawk Football Club in the Bendigo Football League.
