= Alan Daly =

Australian rules footballer (1929–2021)

Personal information
- Full name: Alan Harrie Daly
- Born: 11 May 1929
- Died: 3 January 2021 (aged 91)
- Original team: Eaglehawk

Playing career^{1}
Years	Club	Games (Goals)
1951	Melbourne	7 (3)
- ^{1} Playing statistics correct to the end of 1951.

Alan Harrie Daly (11 May 1929 – 3 January 2021) was an Australian rules footballer who played for the Melbourne Football Club in the Victorian Football League (VFL).
