= Ian Egerton =

Australian rules footballer (1931–2019)

Personal information
- Full name: Ian Cleverly Egerton
- Born: 2 February 1931
- Died: 21 April 2019 (aged 88)
- Original teams: East End (Edward River FL), Deniliquin (MFL), Seymour
- Height: 191 cm (6 ft 3 in)
- Weight: 93 kg (205 lb)
- Position: Ruck

Playing career^{1}
Years	Club	Games (Goals)
1953–57	Hawthorn	56 (7)
- ^{1} Playing statistics correct to the end of 1957.

Career highlights
- Victorian Representative team: 1955

Ian Egerton (2 February 1931 – 21 April 2019) was an Australian rules footballer who played with Hawthorn in the Victorian Football League (VFL). Egerton also played for Victoria in 1955.

Egerton initially played with the East Football Club in the Edward River Football Association in 1948, before playing with Deniliquin in 1949. Egerton then played with East FC in their 1950 Edward River Football Association premiership, then back to Deniliquin FC in 1951. before playing with Hawthorn from 1952 to 1957.
