= Norm Sexton =

Australian rules footballer

Personal information
- Full name: Norman Charles Sexton
- Born: 12 February 1903; Kiewa, Victoria
- Died: 20 October 1952 (aged 49); Terang, Victoria
- Original teams: Brunswick, Coburg
- Height: 173 cm (5 ft 8 in)
- Weight: 63 kg (139 lb)

Playing career^{1}
| Years | Club | Games (Goals) |
| 1924 | Carlton | 3 (0) |
| 1925–1928 | Coburg (VFA) | 51 (4) |
| 1931 | Footscray | 1 (0) |
- ^{1} Playing statistics correct to the end of 1931.

Norman Charles Sexton (12 February 1903 – 21 October 1952) was an Australian rules footballer who played with Carlton and Footscray in the Victorian Football League (VFL).

== Family ==
Born Norman Charles Schroeter, Norm Sexton was the fourth child of John Godfrey Schroeter and Margaret Francis Hopgood. By the time he played football he had adopted the surname Sexton.

== Football ==
Sexton started his career with Coburg when they were a junior club and then played the first three rounds with Carlton in 1924 before returning to Coburg.

He played with Coburg until he was forced to miss the second half of the 1928 VFA season with pneumonia.

In 1931 Sexton returned to VFL football, after serving a three-year suspension (commencing in 1928) for failing to gain a clearance from Carlton to Coburg. His ban was lifted by the VFL Permits Committee in July 1931.

Sexton was captain / coach of Eaglehawk Football Club in 1932, in the Bendigo Football League, where they were runners up to Sandhurst in the grand final.

Sexton was captain / coach of the Deniliquin Football Club to a premiership in 1933, their first year in the Echuca Football League.

Sexton coached the Imperials Football Club to the 1934 premiership in the Hay Football Association.

Sexton was captain / coach of Terang Football Club in 1939, in the Hampden Football League.
