= Jack King (footballer, born 1904) =

Australian rules footballer

Personal information
- Full name: Jack King
- Born: 10 December 1904
- Died: 21 January 1979 (aged 74)
- Original team: Eaglehawk
- Height: 168 cm (5 ft 6 in)
- Weight: 68 kg (150 lb)

Playing career^{1}
Years	Club	Games (Goals)
1929	Carlton	5 (0)
- ^{1} Playing statistics correct to the end of 1929.

Jack King (10 December 1904 – 21 January 1979) was an Australian rules footballer who played with Carlton in the Victorian Football League (VFL).
