= Phil Nagle =

Australian rules footballer

Personal information
- Full name: Phillip Daniel Nagle
- Born: 21 August 1921; Collingwood, Victoria, Australia
- Died: 8 July 1993 (aged 71)
- Original team: Collingwood CYMS (CYMSFA)
- Height: 165 cm (5 ft 5 in)
- Weight: 67 kg (148 lb)

Playing career^{1}
Years	Club	Games (Goals)
1941, 1946	Richmond	15 (12)
- ^{1} Playing statistics correct to the end of 1946.

Phillip Daniel Nagle (21 August 1921 – 8 July 1993) was an Australian rules footballer who played with Richmond in the Victorian Football League (VFL).

Nagle, a rover, was recruited from CYMS Football Association club Collingwood CYMS. He made seven appearances for Richmond in the 1941 VFL season, including the club's semi-final loss to Essendon, then did not play for the next four seasons due to the Second World War. When Nagle returned in the opening round of the 1946 season, he was reported for striking Fitzroy player Noel Price. He was able to play against North Melbourne the following week, but then received his punishment, a four-game suspension. It was not until round 10 that he made his way back into the team and he finished the year with eight appearances. He then captain-coached Echuca Football League club Deniliquin in 1947. They finished runners-up to Echuca that year.
