= Bob Mallett =

Australian rules footballer

Personal information
- Full name: Bob Mallett
- Born: 18 March 1947 (age 79)
- Original team: Port Melbourne Districts
- Height: 188 cm (6 ft 2 in)
- Weight: 81 kg (179 lb)

Playing career^{1}
Years	Club	Games (Goals)
1967–68	South Melbourne	7 (1)
- ^{1} Playing statistics correct to the end of 1968.

Bob Mallett (born 18 March 1947) is a former Australian rules footballer who played with South Melbourne in the Victorian Football League (VFL).

Following the end of his VFL career, Mallet played for Eaglehawk Football Club in the Bendigo Football League.
