= Fred Forbes (Australian footballer) =

Australian rules footballer

Personal information
- Full name: Frederick William Forbes
- Born: 14 May 1883; Maiden Gully, Victoria
- Died: 20 April 1958 (aged 74); Richmond, Victoria
- Original team: Eaglehawk

Playing career^{1}
Years	Club	Games (Goals)
1908	Fitzroy	5 (6)
- ^{1} Playing statistics correct to the end of 1908.

Frederick William Forbes (14 May 1883 – 20 April 1958) was an Australian rules footballer who played with Fitzroy in the Victorian Football League (VFL).
