= Daryl Gilmore =

Australian rules footballer

Personal information
- Full name: Daryl Gilmore
- Born: 12 April 1961 (age 65)
- Original team: Eaglehawk
- Height: 183 cm (6 ft 0 in)
- Weight: 76 kg (168 lb)
- Position: Forward

Playing career^{1}
Years	Club	Games (Goals)
1983	Carlton	1 (3)
- ^{1} Playing statistics correct to the end of 1983.

Daryl Gilmore (born 12 April 1961) is a former Australian rules footballer who played with Carlton in the Victorian Football League (VFL).
