= George Stewart (footballer, born 1882) =

Australian rules footballer

Personal information
- Full name: George Wilkinson Stewart
- Born: 17 September 1882; Anderston, Glasgow, Scotland
- Died: 5 December 1966 (aged 84); Bendigo, Victoria
- Original team: Eaglehawk
- Height: 173 cm (5 ft 8 in)
- Weight: 69 kg (152 lb)

Playing career^{1}
Years	Club	Games (Goals)
1909	Carlton	2 (0)
- ^{1} Playing statistics correct to the end of 1909.

George Wilkinson Stewart (17 September 1882 – 5 December 1966) was an Australian rules footballer who played with Carlton in the Victorian Football League (VFL).
