= Peter O'Donohue =

Australian rules footballer and coach

Personal information
- Full name: John Peter O'Donohue
- Born: 14 June 1923; Port Fairy, Victoria
- Died: 4 November 2012 (aged 89)
- Original team: Hawthorn CYMS (CYMSFA)
- Height: 179 cm (5 ft 10 in)
- Weight: 80 kg (176 lb)

Playing career^{1}
Years	Club	Games (Goals)
1942–43, 1946–52	Hawthorn	109 (24)
1954	West Perth	17 (21)

Coaching career
Years	Club	Games (W–L–D)
1966	Hawthorn	18 (5–13–0)
- ^{1} Playing statistics correct to the end of 1954.

Career highlights
- Hawthorn captain: 1952

Peter O'Donohue (14 June 1923 – 4 November 2012) was an Australian rules footballer who played for Hawthorn in the VFL during the 1940s.

O'Donohue usually played in defence or in the centre and played 109 games with Hawthorn. He was made captain during the 1950 season and kept that position until the end of 1952. His time at Hawthorn was interrupted by his service in the Royal Australian Navy during World War II.

In 1953 he went to Western Australia, where he became captain coach of West Perth for two seasons.

O'Donohue's job with the CSIRO led him to accept an appointment to coach Deniliquin in the Murray Football League in 1955. He led Deniliquin to the 1957 premiership playing as a half back flanker.

O'Donohue was non playing coach of Northcote Football Club in the VFA from 1959 to 1961. He also coached Northcote in 1969. He returned to Hawthorn in 1962 on their committee, then as their Reserves coach in 1965 and replaced Graham Arthur as senior coach in 1966.

Peter went on to be a highly successful amateur coach in the Victorian Amateur Football Association (VAFA), earning life membership of the VAFA in 2002.

== Honours and achievements ==
- Hawthorn captain: 1952
- Hawthorn life member
- Deniliquin Football Club Premiership captain-coach: 1957
