= Harry Crapper =

Australian rules footballer, born 1905

Personal information
- Full name: Henry Sylvester Crapper
- Born: 15 January 1905; Raywood, Victoria
- Died: 28 December 1976 (aged 71); Parkville, Victoria
- Original teams: Maryborough, Castlemaine

Playing career^{1}
Years	Club	Games (Goals)
1930–31	Melbourne	12 (6)
- ^{1} Playing statistics correct to the end of 1931.

Henry Sylvester Crapper (15 January 1905 – 28 December 1976) was an Australian rules footballer who played with Melbourne in the Victorian Football League (VFL).

== Family ==
The son of Henry Crapper (1871-1952), and Winifred Crapper (1875-1951), née Fitzgerald, Henry Sylvester Crapper was born at Raywood, Victoria on 15 January 1905.

His brothers, Thomas Frederick "Fred" Crapper (1909-1976), Francis Gerald "Frank" Crapper (1911-1991), played VFL football with Richmond and North Melbourne, respectively.

He married Veronica Cecilia Carrodus (1906-1993) in 1935.

== Football ==
Recruited by Melbourne from the Castlemaine Football Club in the Bendigo Football League in 1930, he played his first senior game, against Footscray on 31 May 1930.

He was a member of the Melbourne Second XVIII team that won the Grand Final, against Geelong on 10 October 1931.

== Military service ==
He served as a Flight Lieutenant in the Royal Australian Air Force (RAAF) in World War II.

== Death ==
He died at the Royal Melbourne Hospital in Parkville, Victoria on 28 December 1976.
