= Denis Strauch =

Australian rules footballer

Personal information
- Full name: Denis Strauch
- Born: 24 March 1937
- Died: 10 June 1965 (aged 28); Melbourne, Victoria
- Original team: Eaglehawk
- Height: 185 cm (6 ft 1 in)
- Weight: 79 kg (174 lb)

Playing career^{1}
| Years | Club | Games (Goals) |
| 1957–1960 | Carlton | 29 (16) |
| 1961–1965 | Port Melbourne | 73 |
- ^{1} Playing statistics correct to the end of 1965.

Denis Strauch (24 March 1937 – 10 June 1965) was an Australian rules footballer who played with Carlton in the Victorian Football League (VFL).

Carlton recruited Strauch, a forward, from Eaglehawk in 1957 and he made 19 appearances for them that season. He then found himself on the fringes of selection, only adding 10 more games over the next three years.

He finished his football career at Port Melbourne, where he played until his death, from a tetanus infection, in 1965.
