= Rod Ashman =

Australian rules footballer

Personal information
- Full name: Dean Rodney Ashman
- Born: 3 December 1954 (age 71)
- Original team: Eaglehawk
- Debut: Round 5, 1973, Carlton vs. Fitzroy, at Waverley Park
- Height: 175 cm (5 ft 9 in)
- Weight: 76 kg (168 lb)

Playing career^{1}
Years	Club	Games (Goals)
1973–1986	Carlton	236 (370)
- ^{1} Playing statistics correct to the end of 1986.

Career highlights
- Carlton Premiership side 1981–82; Carlton 2nd Best and Fairest 1981, 1984; Carlton Hall of Fame; Carlton Team of the Century; Eaglehawk Team of the Century

Dean Rodney Ashman (born 3 December 1954) is a former Australian rules footballer who represented Carlton in the Victorian Football League (VFL).

Playing primarily in the forward pocket, Ashman was a member of Carlton's famous "Mosquito Fleet" which was pivotal to the club's success in the late 1970s and early 1980s. He played in back-to-back premierships in 1981 and 1982.

Ashman's courageous style of play saw him suffer frequent concussion. After getting concussed several times in the space of a month, Ashman wore a helmet for the rest of his career. Although he didn't like it, he realised its value in a match against Richmond where he got kicked in the head, but was protected by the helmet. When he suffered a stroke in May 2010, Ashman wondered whether it was the result of one of those concussions he sustained during his playing days.

Ashman was inducted into Carlton's Hall of Fame in 1993 and was later named in the forward pocket in Carlton's Team of the Century.
