= Ron James (footballer, born 1907) =

Australian rules footballer, born 1907

Personal information
- Full name: Ron James
- Born: 3 May 1907
- Died: 16 November 1969 (aged 62)
- Original team: Eaglehawk (BFL)
- Height: 178 cm (5 ft 10 in)
- Weight: 75 kg (165 lb)

Playing career^{1}
Years	Club	Games (Goals)
1930	Footscray	1 (0)
- ^{1} Playing statistics correct to the end of 1930.

Ron James (3 May 1907 – 16 November 1969) was a former Australian rules footballer who played with Footscray in the Victorian Football League (VFL).
