= Ted Esposito =

Australian rules footballer, born 1908

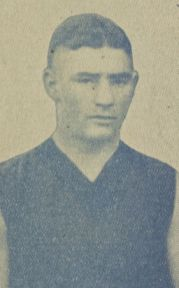

Personal information
- Full name: Ted Esposito
- Born: 23 May 1908
- Died: 1 May 1985 (aged 76)
- Original team: Eaglehawk

Playing career^{1}
Years	Club	Games (Goals)
1929–31	Melbourne	39 (12)
- ^{1} Playing statistics correct to the end of 1931.

Ted Esposito (23 May 1908 - 1 May 1985) was an Australian rules footballer who played with Melbourne in the Victorian Football League (VFL).

Eddie "Moots" Esposito was originally from Eaglehawk in the Bendigo Football League and played with Melbourne for several years before returning to play with Eaglehawk until 1939.

Esposito was selected in the Eaglehawk FNC Team of the Century in 2005.
