= Keith Schaefer =

Australian rules footballer

Personal information
- Born: 20 December 1928; Melbourne, Victoria
- Died: 21 August 1976 (aged 47); Mount Waverley, Victoria
- Original team: South Surfers
- Height: 180 cm (5 ft 11 in)
- Weight: 76 kg (168 lb)

Playing career^{1}
Years	Club	Games (Goals)
1947–1953	South Melbourne	102 (22)
- ^{1} Playing statistics correct to the end of 1953.

Career highlights
- Best & Fairest – 1952

Keith Schaefer (20 December 1928 – 21 August 1976) was an Australian rules footballer who played with South Melbourne in the Victorian Football League (VFL).

Schaefer played 102 games for South Melbourne, between 1947 and 1953. A centreman, Schaefer was a Victorian interstate representative in 1948, at the age of just 19. He won South Melbourne's best and fairest award in 1952.

At the end of the 1953 VFL season, Scheafer left South Melbourne to be playing coach of Deniliquin.

In 1955, Schaefer was captain-coach of Traralgon.

He died in 1976 after losing his battle with bowel cancer.
