= Des English =

Australian rules footballer

Personal information
- Born: 22 January 1956 (age 70)
- Original team: Eaglehawk
- Debut: Round 4, 1980, Carlton vs. South Melbourne, at Princes Park
- Height: 178 cm (5 ft 10 in)
- Weight: 86 kg (190 lb)

Playing career^{1}
Years	Club	Games (Goals)
1980–1986	Carlton	104 (6)
- ^{1} Playing statistics correct to the end of 1986.

Career highlights
- Bendigo FNL Michelsen Medal: 1978; 2 x VFL premierships: 1981, 1982; 1× VFL Team of Year: 1983; Eaglehawk Team of the Century

Des English (born 22 January 1956) is a former Australian rules footballer who played with Carlton in the Victorian Football League (VFL) during the 1980s.

Originally from Eaglehawk in the Bendigo Football League, where he won the 1978 Bendigo Football League best and fairest award, the Michelsen Medal.

Regarded as a tireless and absolutely reliable team player and defender, English played in the Carlton premiership sides of 1981 and 1982. He was diagnosed with leukemia in 1986 and never played again although he eventually recovered.

Carlton's emphatic return win against Hawthorn in the 1987 Grand Final, played out in record breaking September heat was largely attributed inspirationally and motivationally by the Carlton players to the real-life battles of teammates English, after his cancer diagnosis and Peter Motley, after a career-ending car accident. This moment in 1987 is notable for Peter Dean's words spoken on the dais at the game's end: 'Motts..... Dessie...... you're f--king bloody beautiful!!' The episode is something of a legend in Carlton history, inspiring future generations in similar situations.
