= Harry Hall (Australian footballer) =

Australian rules footballer

Personal information
- Full name: Henry Milton Hall
- Born: 17 December 1882; Eaglehawk, Victoria
- Died: 27 July 1967 (aged 84); Bendigo, Victoria
- Original team: Eaglehawk

Playing career^{1}
Years	Club	Games (Goals)
1908	St Kilda	2 (0)
- ^{1} Playing statistics correct to the end of 1908.

Henry Milton Hall (17 December 1882 – 27 July 1967) was an Australian rules football player who played with St Kilda in the Victorian Football League (VFL).
