= Peter Lyon =

Australian rules footballer

Personal information
- Full name: Peter Lyon
- Born: 28 December 1941
- Original teams: Eaglehawk, Deniliquin
- Height: 183 cm (6 ft 0 in)
- Weight: 76 kg (168 lb)
- Position: Centreman

Playing career^{1}
Years	Club	Games (Goals)
1963–1964	Hawthorn	16 (0)
- ^{1} Playing statistics correct to the end of 1964.

Peter Lyon (born 28 December 1941) is a former Australian rules footballer who played for Hawthorn in the Victorian Football League (VFL) during the 1960s.

== Career ==
Lyon played with Eaglehawk originally, then went across to Deniliquin in 1961 and played in a losing grand final against Cobram. Lyon shared the 1961 Murray Football League O'Dwyer Medal with Cobram coach, Les Mogg. Lyon then returned to Eaglehawk in 1962, before heading to Hawthorn in 1963.

Lyon came off the bench in the 1963 VFL Grand Final, which Hawthorn lost to Geelong. He could only break into the seniors three times the following year.

A centreman, Lyon spent the next three seasons as playing coach of Devonport. He represented both the North West Football Union and Tasmanian representative teams, winning the Alstergen Trophy in 1967 for his performance with the former.

Lyon later coached Kyabram to the 1975 Goulburn Valley Football League premiership.

== Personal life ==
Lyon's son, Garry, played at Melbourne and is a current Australian rules football media personality.
