= Damien Lock =

Australian rules footballer

Personal information
- Born: 1 October 1978 (age 48)
- Original team: Eaglehawk/Bendigo Pioneers
- Draft: 52nd overall, 1996 National draft
- Height: 179 cm (5 ft 10 in)
- Weight: 73 kg (161 lb)

Playing career^{1}
Years	Club	Games (Goals)
1998–1999	Carlton	18 (0)
- ^{1} Playing statistics correct to the end of 1999.

Damien Lock (born 1 October 1978) is a former Australian rules footballer & current Professional Boxer, who played with Carlton in the Australian Football League (AFL).
