= Max Hetherington =

Australian rules footballer

Personal information
- Full name: Max Hetherington
- Born: 2 November 1935
- Died: 4 November 2009 (aged 74)
- Original team: Eaglehawk
- Height: 188 cm (6 ft 2 in)
- Weight: 87 kg (192 lb)

Playing career^{1}
Years	Club	Games (Goals)
1957–58	Geelong	11 (4)
- ^{1} Playing statistics correct to the end of 1958.

Max Hetherington (2 November 1935 – 4 November 2009) was an Australian rules footballer who played with Geelong in the Victorian Football League (VFL).
