= Simon O'Donnell =

Australian sportsman

Personal information
- Full name: Simon Patrick O'Donnell
- Born: 26 January 1963 (age 63); Deniliquin, New South Wales, Australia
- Batting: Right-handed
- Bowling: Right-arm fast-medium
- Relatives: James O'Donnell (son); Tom O'Donnell (son)

International information
- National side: Australia
- Test debut (cap 329): 13 June 1985 v England
- Last Test: 22 November 1985 v New Zealand
- ODI debut (cap 83): 6 January 1985 v West Indies
- Last ODI: 10 December 1991 v India

Domestic team information
- Years: Team
- 1983/84–1992/93: Victoria

Career statistics
Competition	Test	ODI	FC	LA
Matches	6	87	83	116
Runs scored	206	1,242	4,603	1,784
Batting average	29.42	25.34	39.34	25.12
100s/50s	0/0	0/9	7/31	0/12
Top score	48	74*	130	74*
Balls bowled	940	4,350	11,647	5,827
Wickets	6	108	151	126
Bowling average	84.00	28.72	37.36	32.47
5 wickets in innings	0	1	2	1
10 wickets in match	0	0	0	0
Best bowling	3/37	5/13	6/54	5/13
Catches/stumpings	4/–	22/–	60/0	27/0
Medal record
Men's Cricket
Representing Australia
ICC Cricket World Cup
Winner	1987 India and Pakistan
- Source: Cricinfo, 18 January 2006

Simon Patrick O'Donnell (born 26 January 1963) is an Australian former cricketer, VFL footballer, and horse racing and cricket commentator. He is currently a horse breeder and enabler. He is a former record holder for the fastest One Day International half-century. He was educated at Deniliquin High School and Assumption College. O'Donnell was a part of the Australian team that won their first world title during the 1987 Cricket World Cup.

== Cricket ==
O'Donnell played as an all-rounder for Victoria in the Sheffield Shield between 1984 and 1993, scoring a century in his first match. He went on to play 6 Test matches in 1985, 5 on the Ashes tour of England and one at home, but with a low bowling strike rate in 5 and 4 day cricket, he was more successful in the shorter form of the game.

Seen as a limited-overs specialist with clever medium pace bowling and explosive lower order hitting, he played 87 ODIs between 1985 and 1992, scoring 1242 runs and taking 108 wickets in his career. He played in Australia's 1987 World Cup Final victory and was a significant wicket-taker and finished the World cup as Australia's most economical bowler, but soon after he suffered severe pain that was diagnosed as non-Hodgkin lymphoma.

He recovered with treatment to return to the Australian One-Day team in the 1988–89 season and played 43 more limited-overs matches till 10 December 1991 and claimed 56 wickets and made 5 match winning 50 plus scores including the fastest half-century in One Day Internationals (18 balls v Sri Lanka, Sharjah, 1990, which lasted for 6 years until Sri Lankan Sanath Jayasuriya scored 50 from 17 balls v Pakistan at Singapore on 7 April 1996). O'Donnell maintained a very good batting strike rate of 80.96 runs per 100 balls in ODIs, almost double his scoring rate in Tests.

He was captain of Victoria for five seasons from 1988–89 until his retirement in 1993. This was a mixed period, which included a Sheffield Shield victory in 90–91, but Victoria also finished last in 1988–89, 1989–90 and 1992–93.

O'Donnell was voted international cricketer of the year in 1990–91.

== Australian rules football ==
As a junior, Simon played Australian rules football for Assumption College, Kilmore, where he kicked 100 goals in his senior year. This led to him being recruited for senior football by the St Kilda Football Club, where his father Kevin had played 49 games on a forward flank in the 1940s. Coincidentally, Kevin O'Donnell played alongside two more notable Australian cricketers; Sam Loxton and Keith Miller, members of the 1948 Invincibles.

O'Donnell played 24 games and kicked 18 goals between 1982 and 1983 in what was then the VFL. However, he had continued to play cricket and retired from football to focus on his cricket career.

O'Donnell's son James made his AFL debut for Western Bulldogs playing against Carlton on 13 May 2023.

== Media career ==
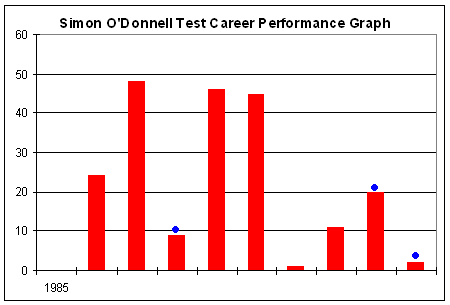
Simon O'Donnell's Test career batting performance.

O'Donnell hosted Melbourne radio station Sport 927's morning program with Kevin Bartlett until 2004.

With the Nine Network, O'Donnell has been a commentator of cricket and now presents The Cricket Show. Having owned and managed race horses through his company, O'Donnell Thoroughbreds International, he is also used as an expert on horseracing on Nine's racing coverage.

During the mid-1990s as part of his work with Channel 9, O'Donnell was a regular on the daytime program The Midday Show, teaming up with former rugby league footballer Paul "Fatty" Vautin on Fridays to give an overview of the weekends sporting events, usually the AFL and NSWRL competitions, and to give their racing tips. The pair would generally get into silly situations (e.g. coming out onto the set dressed in blowup Sumo suits), or would be on location such as in early 1994 when O'Donnell was taken on some hot laps of the high speed Calder Park Thunderdome oval racetrack in Melbourne with multiple AUSCAR champion Brad Jones.

In November 2011, it was announced that O'Donnell would replace James Brayshaw as host of The Sunday Footy Show. However, in November 2012, Nine announced that O'Donnell had left the network.

== Cricket career ==
=== 1983–84 Season ===
O'Donnell made his first class debut for Victoria against South Australia at the MCG in February 1984.

=== 1984–85 ===
The following summer his bowling gathered attention when he took the wickets of Kepler Wessels and Allan Border in Sheffield Shield game against Queensland, as well as making 54.

He made 78 in a run-heavy game against the touring West Indies and hit 42 off 43 balls and 129 against Western Australia.

He was selected in the Prime Ministers XI to play the West Indies.

In January 1985 O'Donnell was named in the 12 man Australian one day squad.

O'Donnell's one day debut was a successful one, taking 1–39 and scoring 20 not out against Sri Lanka. He scored 25 in a defeat against the West Indies.

In the Prime Ministers XI game he took two wickets but dropped two catches. Kept on in the one day team he took two wickets against Sri Lanka then scored some useful runs in a rare Australian victory over the West Indies.

In the World Championship of Cricket, O'Donnell made 74 and took 2–42 against Pakistan. This helped earn O'Donnell selection on the short tour to Sharjah in early 1985. He was also selected on the squad to tour England for the Ashes.

O'Donnell had only played seven first-class matches, hitting 528 runs at an average of 66, with two centuries, and had taken 15 wickets at an average of 38.23. He was still listed in the St Kilda squad.

=== 1985 Ashes ===
O'Donnell leapt into test contention with a score of 100 against the MCC.

O'Donnell played in the Australian team for the one day internationals, taking two wickets in the second.

He was picked in Australian side for the first test, as the fourth bowler. He scored 24 and took 3 wickets in England's second innings. England won the game.

O'Donnell kept his place in the side for the second test. He navigated a second innings run chase and hit the winning runs with a six.

There was a risk he would be made 12th man for the third test but O'Donnell kept his position. He was made 12th man for the last test.

=== 1985–86 ===
O'Donnell injured his hip at the beginning of the 1985–86 season and missed some early games. He recovered in time to be selected for the first test against New Zealand. He took a career best 2–53 and 5–66 against New South Wales. However fellow all rounder Greg Matthews took 5–22 in the same game and he was preferred to O'Donnell, who was made 12th man.

O'Donnell was kept in the squad and played in the second test against New Zealand. He took part in an important second innings partnership which guided Australia to victory. However he was injured during the test while fielding and was omitted from the third test.

He was out of cricket for a number of weeks. He returned against Tasmania taking 3–48.

=== 1986–87 ===
O'Donnell began the 1986–87 season well with 52 against Tasmania and 108 against NSW. He followed this with 77 against England in a tour game and 86 against West Australia.

He was unable to force his way back into the test team but was selected in Australia's one day squad. Highlights included 4–65 against the West Indies, 52 against the West Indies, 3–39 against England, a man of the match 4–19 against the West Indies, and a match winning 23 off 15 balls against the West Indies. Allan Border said that O'Donnell, Dean Jones and Steve Waugh had been Australia's stand out players of the series.

O'Donnell's good form continued with 86 against Queensland and 73 against South Australia. He made 80 and 78 against WA in the Sheffield Shield final, but Victoria did not win the game.

O'Donnell was selected to play in Australia's one day tour of Sharjah in 1987 and the World Cup.

=== 1987 World Cup and cancer ===
O'Donnell had felt lumps on his ribs before he left for India, but he neglected to see the team's doctor, as he did not want to interrupt his team's campaign.

O'Donnell's World Cup highlights include 4–39 against Zimbabwe.

O'Donnell went to Warrigal Private Hospital immediately after returning to Australia, where he underwent a biopsy and was diagnosed with non-Hodgkin's lymphoma. O'Donnell, who claimed that he felt "as strong as a bull" during his ordeal, commenced chemotherapy and received the good wishes of Prime Minister Bob Hawke.

Three months later O'Donnell was declared cancer free.

=== 1988–89: Victorian Captain ===
Simon O'Donnell was appointed Victorian captain at the beginning of the 1988–89 season.

O'Donnell's highlights for the summer included 6–54 against NSW.

Victoria came last in the Sheffield Shield that summer. However Victoria did make the finals of the one day FAI Cup.

O'Donnell was selected in the Australian one day team that summer; he was later dropped after the first final. His first game back was a successful one, taking 1–45 and scoring 46 off 54 balls against Pakistan.

Through the 1989 English summer, O'Donnell played club cricket for Haslingden. He played a game for the Rest of the World against Glamorgan and scored 66 off 23 balls.

He played in the Australian one day team that toured India in late 1989, and had a mediocre tournament with the exception of 3–48 against Sri Lanka.

=== 1989/90 ===
At the beginning of the 1989–90 summer there was some talk that Dean Jones might captain Victoria instead of O'Donnell. However O'Donnell retained the captaincy.

During that summer, O'Donnell scored centuries against the touring Sri Lanka side and Tasmania.

He kept his place in the Australian side for the one day tournament at the end of the summer. He won man of the match against Sri Lanka, scoring 57 and taking 4–36. Other highlights of the summer included 3–36 against Sri Lanka.

O'Donnell toured New Zealand with the one day side, taking 5–13 in a game against New Zealand. He later made 52 in another game.

He also toured with Australia on a trip to Sharjah. In a game against Sri Lanka, O'Donnell scored 74 off 29 balls, making his 50 in 18 balls – the fastest one day 50 at that time.

=== 1990–91: International Cricketer of the Year and Sheffield Shield Champions ===
O'Donnell continued to play strongly for the Australian one-day team throughout the 1990–91 summer. Highlights included 4–45 against England, and 71 against England He became Australia's leading ODI wicket-taker, a title hitherto held by Dennis Lillee, and there was talk he might go to the West Indies as a limited over specialist. He was not selected but did win the International Cricketer of the Year Award despite playing no tests. He also led Victoria to the Sheffield Shield when they defeated New South Wales in the final.

In 1991 he scored 71 off 45 balls in a one-day game for Victoria against Essex.

=== 1991–92 ===
O'Donnell was selected in Australia's one day side for 1991–92 but had to withdraw due to a dislocated shoulder. He played for Victoria as a batsman only for a few games. Despite his injury he was named in Australia's preliminary 20 man squad for the 1992 World Cup. He suffered a poor run of form, scoring 124 runs at an average of 12 with the bat, and only bowling gently medium pace. He was not picked for the final 14 man World Cup squad.

O'Donnell responded with a quickfire 87 against South Australia for Victoria.

Australia struggled during the World Cup, failing to make the semi-finals, and Allan Border later wondered if omitting O'Donnell was a mistake.

=== 1992–93 ===
O'Donnell was reappointed Victorian captain for the 1992–93 season. He earned selection in the Prime Ministers XI. Victoria struggled that summer and O'Donnell's captaincy came under criticism for supposedly being weak.

Victorian officials said that O'Donnell had their support. O'Donnell stated that, after the media alleged that O'Donnell may be kicked off the team, he was contemplating stepping down as captain.

In July 1993 O'Donnell resigned as captain of Victoria.
