= Claude Rowe =

Australian rules footballer, born 1904

Personal information
- Full name: Claude Richard Robert Rowe
- Born: 17 July 1904; Long Gully, Victoria
- Died: 29 September 1973 (aged 69); South Yarra, Victoria
- Original team: Eaglehawk
- Height: 175 cm (5 ft 9 in)

Playing career^{1}
| Years | Club | Games (Goals) |
| 1929 | North Melbourne | 2 (1) |
- ^{1} Playing statistics correct to the end of 1929.

Claude Richard Robert Rowe (17 July 1904 – 29 September 1973) was an Australian rules footballer who played with North Melbourne in the Victorian Football League (VFL).

He was the younger brother of Richmond player Joe Rowe.

Rowe later served in the Australian Army during World War II.
