= Dudley Cassidy =

Australian rules footballer, born 1912

Personal information
- Born: 15 October 1912
- Died: 2 July 2003 (aged 90)
- Original team: Collingwood
- Height: 177 cm (5 ft 10 in)
- Weight: 68 kg (150 lb)

Playing career^{1}
Years	Club	Games (Goals)
1935–1937	North Melbourne	29 (66)
- ^{1} Playing statistics correct to the end of 1937.

Dudley Cassidy (15 October 1912 – 2 July 2003) was an Australian rules footballer who played with North Melbourne in the Victorian Football League (VFL).

Cassidy was originally listed at Collingwood but after getting a clearance joined North Melbourne and made his league debut in 1935. He was North Melbourne's leading goal-kicker in 1936 when he kicked 48 goals.
