= Ike Ilsley =

Australian rules footballer

Personal information
- Full name: Robert "Ike" Ilsley
- Born: 3 January 1940
- Original team: Eaglehawk
- Height: 185 cm (6 ft 1 in)
- Weight: 94 kg (207 lb)

Playing career^{1}
| Years | Club | Games (Goals) |
| 1962 | St Kilda | 2 (0) |
- ^{1} Playing statistics correct to the end of 1962.

Ike Ilsley (born 3 January 1940) is a former Australian rules footballer who played with St Kilda in the Victorian Football League (VFL).
