= John Rodolph Slattery =

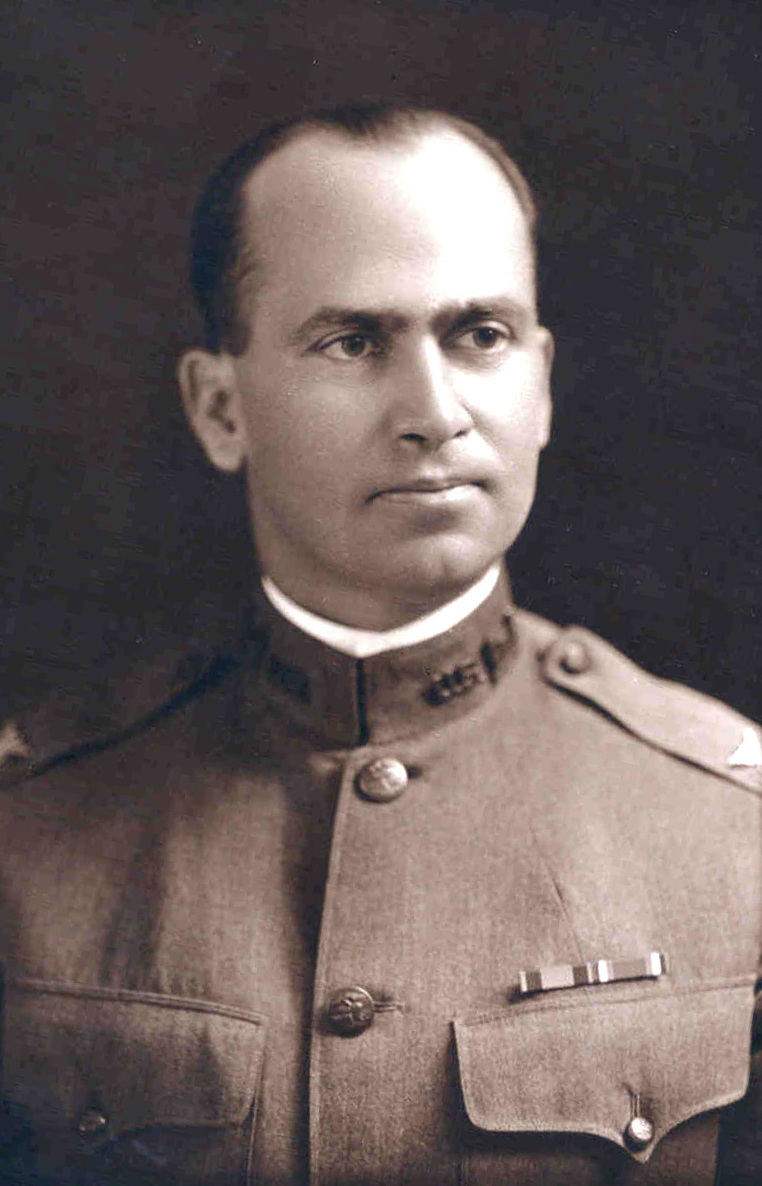
- Born: January 31, 1877; Athens, Ohio
- Died: September 24, 1932 (aged 55); Jackson Heights, New York City
- Occupation: United States Army Corps of Engineers
- Spouse: Elizabeth Virginia Bradley (m. 1905)
- Parent(s): John A. Slattery; Lena DeSteiguer

Signature
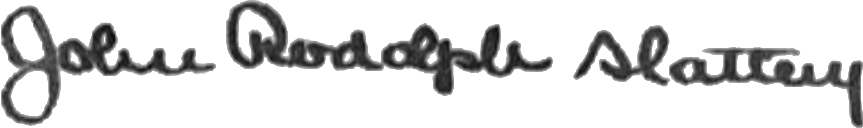

Colonel John Rodolph Slattery (January 31, 1877 – September 24, 1932) was the general manager for the Independent Subway System in New York City.

== Biography ==
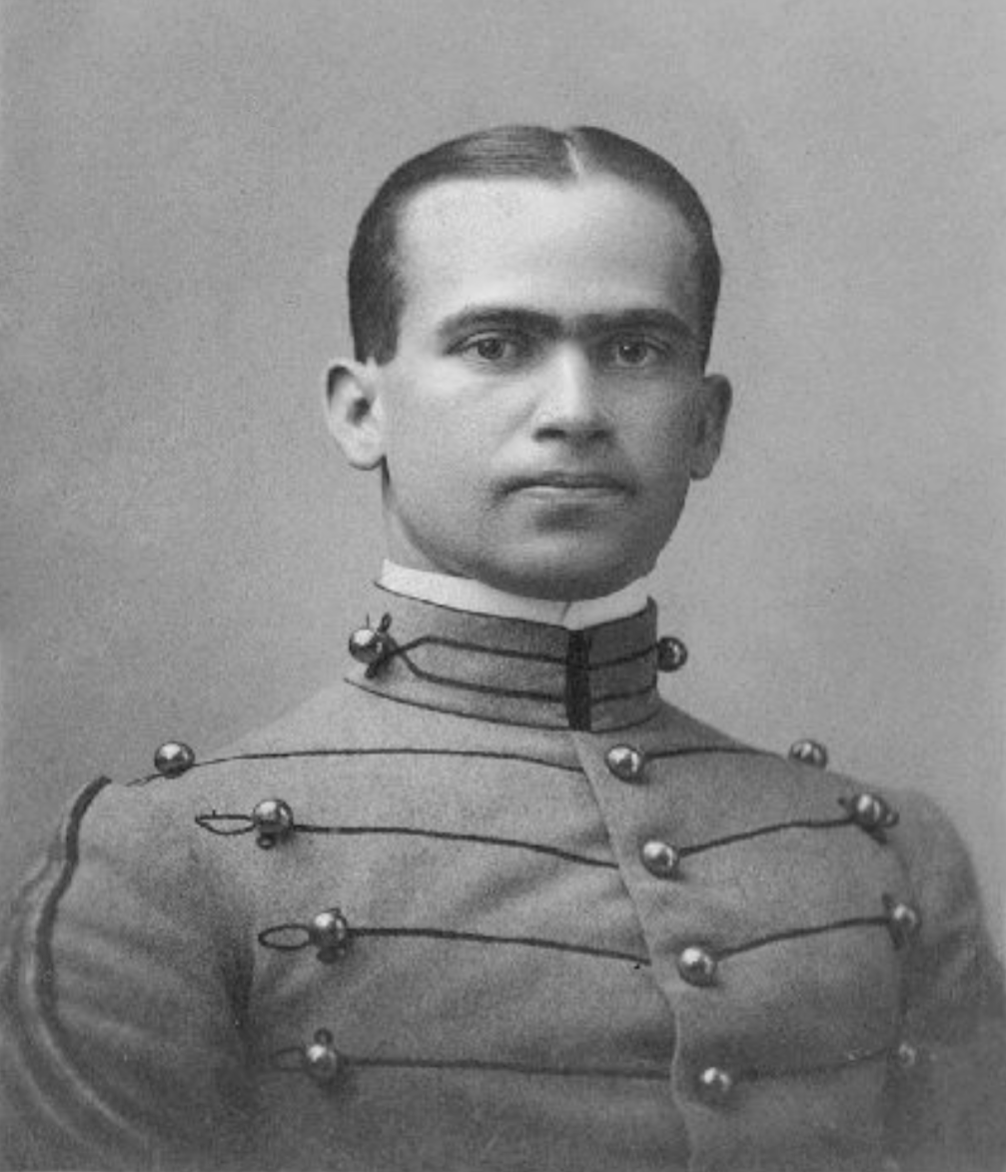
At West Point in 1900

He was born in Athens, Ohio, on January 31, 1877, to John A. Slattery (1847–1895) and Lena DeSteiguer (1854–1925). He attended the United States Military Academy and graduated fifth in his class for the year 1900. He was assigned, as an engineer officer, to work on roads and bridges in the Philippines. He was assigned to Honolulu in November 1904 as the Honolulu District's first District Engineer for lighthouses.

He married Elizabeth Virginia Bradley (1879–1949) in Visalia, California on February 22, 1905. He died on September 24, 1932, in Jackson Heights, New York City.
