= Neal Thompson (footballer) =

Australian rules footballer, born 1905

Personal information
- Full name: Josiah William Neal Thompson
- Born: 23 June 1905; Warracknabeal, Victoria
- Died: 13 April 1987 (aged 81); Bendigo, Victoria
- Original team: Eaglehawk

Playing career^{1}
Years	Club	Games (Goals)
1929	North Melbourne	1 (0)
- ^{1} Playing statistics correct to the end of 1929.

Josiah William Neal Thompson (23 June 1905 – 13 April 1987) was an Australian rules footballer who played with North Melbourne in the Victorian Football League (VFL).

Thompson was recruited from Eaglehawk and made his VFL debut in round two, 1929.

He later served in the Australian Army during World War II.
