= Kevin O'Donnell (footballer) =

Australian rules footballer (1924–2002)

Personal information
- Full name: Kevin O'Donnell
- Born: 12 July 1924; St Kilda, Victoria
- Died: 15 January 2002 (aged 77)
- Original team: South Caulfield CYMS (CYMSFA)
- Height: 183 cm (6 ft 0 in)
- Weight: 80 kg (176 lb)

Playing career^{1}
Years	Club	Games (Goals)
1946–1949	St Kilda	49 (20)
- ^{1} Playing statistics correct to the end of 1949.

Kevin O'Donnell (12 July 1924 – 15 January 2002) was an Australian rules footballer who played with St Kilda in the Victorian Football League (VFL).

== Early years ==
Born in Melbourne, O'Donnell was a student at St Kilda's Christian Brothers College. He later did a building apprenticeship at Swinburne College.

His early football was played with South Caulfield CYMS.

=== Military service ===
In World War II he served overseas with the Royal Australian Air Force after enlisting in 1943. Following service in Britain, O'Donnell was a member of the occupation forces in Germany.

== Football ==
=== St Kilda career ===
O'Donnell, a half forward, debuted in the opening round of the 1946 VFL season, against North Melbourne at Arden Street Oval. He kicked two goals and was named amongst St Kilda's best.

From 1946 to 1949, O'Donnell amassed 49 league games for St Kilda.

=== Deniliquin coach ===
In 1950, O'Donnell left St Kilda to coach in New South Wales, for Deniliquin in the Murray Football League. He remained senior coach in 1951, then played the 1952 season as a player only, as former South Melbourne player Ted Whitfield took charge.

O'Donnell was in the Deniliquin team which drew the 1952 grand final with Finley and lost by replay by six points.

In 1953 he returned as coach for one final season and was runner up in the 1953 Murray Football League best and fairest award, the O'Dwyer Medal.

He was president of the Deniliquin Football Club from 1973 to 1978.

== Later life and family ==
A builder by trade, O'Donnell remained in Deniliquin, where he raised four children with wife Bernadette. The youngest, Simon O'Donnell, played 24 games for St Kilda in the 1980s, but is best known as a cricketer. He won a World Cup with Australia in 1987.

Heavily involved in the racing industry, he bred his own racehorses and was a trustee of the Deniliquin racecourse.
