= Joe Rowe (Australian footballer) =

Australian rules footballer

Personal information
- Full name: John Henry Rowe
- Born: 26 May 1901; Long Gully, Victoria
- Died: 21 July 1968 (aged 67); Eaglehawk, Victoria
- Original team: Eaglehawk

Playing career^{1}
Years	Club	Games (Goals)
1924	Richmond	2 (1)
- ^{1} Playing statistics correct to the end of 1924.

John Henry "Joe" Rowe (26 May 1901 – 21 July 1968) was an Australian rules footballer who played with Richmond in the Victorian Football League (VFL).

He was the older brother of North Melbourne player Claude Rowe.
