= Bill Evely =

Australian rules footballer

Personal information
- Full name: William Evely
- Born: 27 July 1934
- Died: 26 June 2015 (aged 80)
- Original team: Eaglehawk
- Height: 182 cm (6 ft 0 in)
- Weight: 76 kg (168 lb)

Playing career^{1}
Years	Club	Games (Goals)
1956, 1958	Richmond	11 (5)
- ^{1} Playing statistics correct to the end of 1958.

Bill Evely (27 July 1934 – 26 June 2015) was an Australian rules footballer who played with Richmond in the Victorian Football League (VFL).

Evely also played and coached numerous teams in the Bendigo District Cricket Association, where he was inducted into the Hall of Fame.
