= Eddie O'Halloran =

Australian rules footballer

Personal information
- Full name: Eddie O'Halloran
- Born: 11 March 1943
- Original team: West Footscray
- Height: 180 cm (5 ft 11 in)
- Weight: 89 kg (196 lb)

Playing career^{1}
Years	Club	Games (Goals)
1963–64	Footscray	6 (2)
- ^{1} Playing statistics correct to the end of 1964.

Eddie O'Halloran (born 11 March 1943) is a former Australian rules footballer who played with Footscray in the Victorian Football League (VFL).
