= Bobby Walker (Australian footballer) =

Australian rules footballer

Personal information
- Full name: Robert John Walker
- Born: 14 January 1900; Northcote, Victoria
- Died: 19 May 1971 (aged 71); Fitzroy, Victoria
- Height: 170 cm (5 ft 7 in)
- Weight: 68 kg (150 lb)

Playing career^{1}
Years	Club	Games (Goals)
1924	Fitzroy	3 (2)
- ^{1} Playing statistics correct to the end of 1924.

Robert John Walker (14 January 1900 – 19 May 1971) was an Australian rules footballer who played with Fitzroy in the Victorian Football League (VFL).
