= Eddie Gray (Australian footballer) =

Australian rules footballer, born 1915

Personal information
- Full name: Eddie Gray
- Born: 8 January 1915
- Died: 18 March 2009 (aged 94)
- Original team: Eaglehawk
- Height: 182 cm (6 ft 0 in)
- Weight: 82 kg (181 lb)

Playing career^{1}
Years	Club	Games (Goals)
1935	Collingwood	1 (0)
- ^{1} Playing statistics correct to the end of 1935.

Eddie Gray (8 January 1915 – 18 March 2009) was an Australian rules footballer who played with Collingwood in the Victorian Football League (VFL).
