= Reg Collier =

Australian rules footballer, born 1908

Personal information
- Full name: Reg Collier
- Born: 5 October 1908
- Died: 9 June 1976 (aged 67)
- Original team: Eaglehawk
- Height: 170 cm (5 ft 7 in)
- Weight: 70 kg (154 lb)

Playing career^{1}
Years	Club	Games (Goals)
1935	Footscray	2 (0)
- ^{1} Playing statistics correct to the end of 1935.

Reg Collier (5 October 1908 – 9 June 1976) was a former Australian rules footballer who played with Footscray in the Victorian Football League (VFL).
