= George McWilliam =

Australian rules footballer

Personal information
- Full name: George Vincent McWilliam
- Born: 3 February 1878; Richmond, Victoria
- Died: 21 May 1968 (aged 90); Parkville, Victoria
- Original team: Eaglehawk
- Height: 178 cm (5 ft 10 in)

Playing career^{1}
Years	Club	Games (Goals)
1907–09	Fitzroy	18 (1)
- ^{1} Playing statistics correct to the end of 1909.

Career highlights
- 2005-Eaglehawk Team of the Century

George Vincent McWilliam (3 February 1878 – 21 May 1968) was an Australian rules footballer who played with Fitzroy in the Victorian Football League (VFL).

Educated at Geelong College, McWilliam was a member of the 1st Football Teams of 1893 and 1894 and the 1st Cricket Team of 1893.

He married Eva Marie Moroni in 1900 and became a chemist, initially living in Williamstown and playing for Williamstown in the Victorian Football Association.

They moved to Eaglehawk around 1903 and George quickly became a leading footballer in the Bendigo district and captain of the Eaglehawk team.

In 1907 he was recruited by Fitzroy and played a total of 18 games for them.

He later returned to Eaglehawk, playing with them until he left the district in 1915.

McWilliam enlisted to serve in World War I on 23 July 1915, aged 37. He embarked from Melbourne on HMAT A42 Boorara for Egypt on 10 May 1917 and served as a Staff Sergeant with the Australian Camel Brigade Field Ambulance.

After his return to Australia he worked and lived in Ascot Vale for many years until his death in 1968.
