= Clive Brown (footballer) =

Australian rules footballer

Personal information
- Full name: Clive Brown
- Born: 15 May 1934
- Died: 11 November 2009 (aged 75)
- Original team: Eaglehawk
- Height: 175 cm (5 ft 9 in)
- Weight: 73 kg (161 lb)
- Position: Wing

Playing career^{1}
Years	Club	Games (Goals)
1955–60	Geelong	72 (4)
- ^{1} Playing statistics correct to the end of 1960.

Clive Brown (15 May 1934 – 11 November 2009) was a former Australian rules footballer who played with Geelong in the Victorian Football League (VFL).
