= Jack Slattery (footballer) =

Australian rules footballer

Personal information
- Full name: Edward John Slattery
- Born: 23 March 1937
- Original team: Eaglehawk
- Height: 183 cm (6 ft 0 in)
- Weight: 74 kg (163 lb)

Playing career^{1}
Years	Club	Games (Goals)
1959–1962	Footscray	32 (41)
- ^{1} Playing statistics correct to the end of 1962.

Edward John Slattery (born 23 March 1937) is a former Australian rules footballer who played with Footscray in the Victorian Football League (VFL).

== Biography ==
Slattery, a forward from Eaglehawk, had his most productive season in 1961 when he kicked 25 goals from his 13 appearances. This included a four-goal haul in Footscray's preliminary final win over Melbourne. He then lined up at full-forward in the 1961 VFL Grand Final but didn't kick a goal and finished on the losing team.

He had a brother, Kevin Slattery, who played briefly for North Melbourne.
