= Neil Thompson (cricketer) =

English cricketer

Personal information
- Full name: Neil Powney Thompson
- Born: 10 October 1938; Colombo, Western Province, British Ceylon
- Died: 2 September 2021 (aged 82); Williamsburg, Virginia
- Batting: Left-handed
- Bowling: Left-arm fast-medium

Domestic team information
- Years: Team
- 1961: Oxford University

Career statistics
Competition	First-class
Matches	7
Runs scored	16
Batting average	4.00
100s/50s	–/–
Top score	4*
Balls bowled	1,277
Wickets	17
Bowling average	37.47
5 wickets in innings	–
10 wickets in match	–
Best bowling	4/72
Catches/stumpings	3/–
- Source: Cricinfo, 25 June 2020

Neil Powney Thompson (10 October 1938 – 2 September 2021) was an English first-class cricketer.

Thompson was born at Colombo in October 1938. He later studied in England at Worcester College at the University of Oxford. While studying at Oxford, he played first-class cricket for Oxford University in 1961, making seven appearances, which included playing in that years University Match against Cambridge at Lord's. A left-arm fast-medium bowler, Thompson took 17 wickets in his seven matches at an average of 37.47, with best figures of 4 for 72.

Thompson died on 2 September 2021, at the age of 82.
