= Fred Crapper =

Australian rules footballer

Personal information
- Full name: Thomas Frederick Crapper
- Born: 4 March 1909
- Died: 12 June 1976 (aged 67)
- Original team: Eaglehawk
- Height: 185 cm (6 ft 1 in)
- Weight: 86 kg (190 lb)

Playing career^{1}
Years	Club	Games (Goals)
1936	Richmond	2 (0)
- ^{1} Playing statistics correct to the end of 1936.

Thomas Frederick Crapper (4 March 1909 – 12 June 1976) was a former Australian rules footballer who played with Richmond in the Victorian Football League (VFL).
