= Eaglehawk, Victoria =

Eaglehawk
- Suburb
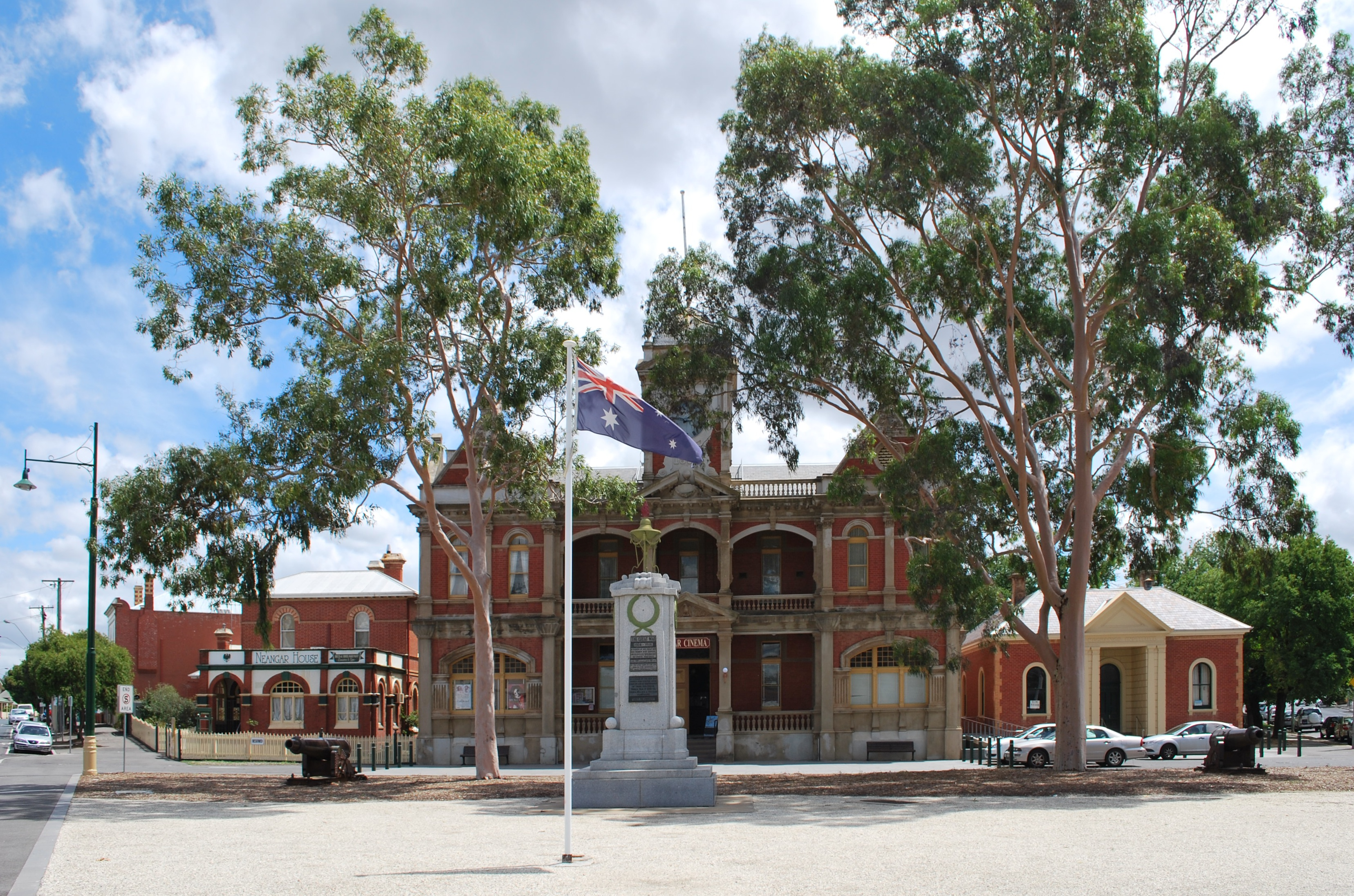
- Town hall, now a cinema, with the war memorial in the foreground

- Interactive map of Eaglehawk
- Coordinates: 36°43′0″S 144°15′0″E
- Country: Australia
- State: Victoria
- City: Bendigo
- LGA: City of Greater Bendigo
- Location: 156 km (97 mi) NW of Melbourne; 6 km (3.7 mi) NW of Bendigo
- Established: 1852

Government
  - Federal division: Division of Bendigo

Population
  - Total: 5,538 (2021 census)
- Postcode: 3556
Suburbs around Eaglehawk
Eaglehawk	Jackass Flat
California Gully

Eaglehawk is a suburb within the City of Greater Bendigo and a former gold-mining town in Victoria, Australia.

Eaglehawk is situated to the north-west of Bendigo on the Loddon Valley Highway. The highway is known locally as High Street until the intersection with Sailors Gully Road (Bendigo - Pyramid Road) and as Peg Leg Road to the west. Located on this intersection is Brassey Square which is the location of the town hall. Next to the town hall is the former post office and the Mechanics' Institute. To the north of the intersection on Napier Street is Canterbury Park and Lake Neangar while the Swan Hill railway line and the local railway station are located to the south.

== History ==
The original inhabitants of the area were the Dja Dja Wurrung.

Following the discovery of gold at Sandhurst (Bendigo) in October 1851, Joseph Crook discovered a gold nugget while searching for stray horses. This event sparked a gold rush in the area leading to the establishment of the township in 1852, the population quickly building up to 40,000. The Post Office opened on 1 August 1857. In 1862, the Borough of Eaglehawk was established, which included the nearby township of California Gully. After the alluvial gold was exhausted in 1893, reef mines were established, with 300 tonnes of gold extracted. Most of the mines had closed by the 1890s and by 1947 the population had decreased substantially to 4,090.

The Eaglehawk Magistrates' Court closed on 1 January 1990.

In 1994 the Borough of Eaglehawk was amalgamated by the Victorian Government with four other councils to become the city of Greater Bendigo.

== Community facilities ==
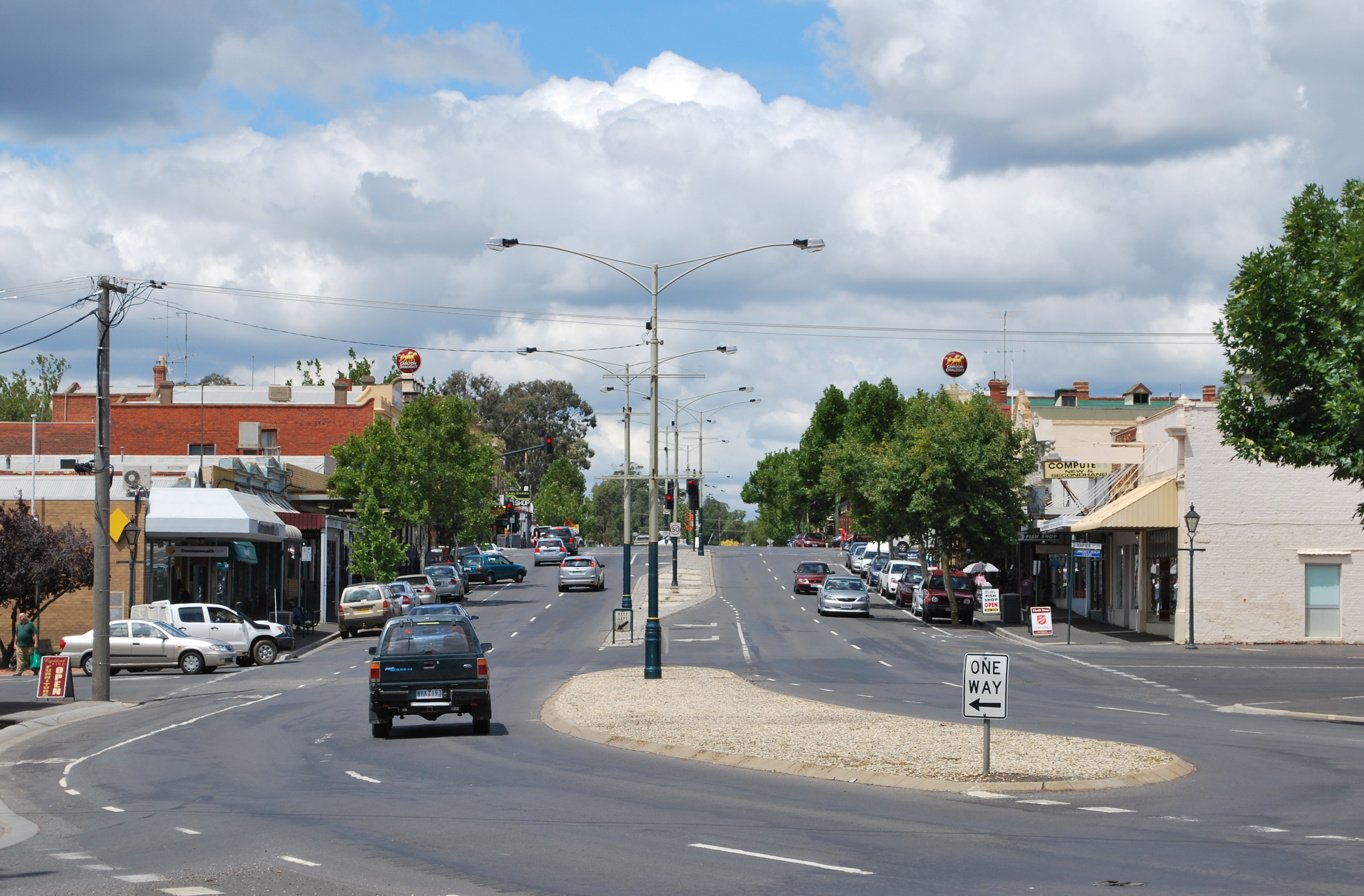
High St, the main street of Eaglehawk

=== Schools ===
Eaglehawk has a government primary school (Eaglehawk Primary School), a Catholic primary school (St Liborius Primary School) and a government secondary college (Eaglehawk Secondary College).

=== Sporting facilities ===
Canterbury Park was crown land set aside by the Eaglehawk Borough Council for the purpose of a sports ground and gardens and in November 1872, the Eaglehawk Cricket Club requested to the council that the land at Canterbury Park be levelled "to suit it for cricket purposes".

Canterbury Park has a modern sports oval which caters for the Australian Rules football/netball club and cricket club, with new changeroons and socials rooms that were built in 2015 and replaced the old Bill Crawford Pavilion that was built in 1961.

The Eaglehawk Football Club has three football teams and five netball teams that compete in the Bendigo Football League. Canterbury Park has always been the home of the "Hawks" or the "Two Blues" ever since the club was established way back in 1880.

Canterbury Park also has lawn bowling and croquet facilities. The Eaglehawk Croquet Club Inc. was founded in 1909, in premises vacated by the Eaglehawk Bowling Club. Golf Croquet was introduced in 1975 and subscriptions for this style of croquet is rising. Association, Golf Croquet and Golf Croquet Pennant games are played. The Eaglehawk Croquet Club is a part of the Northern District Croquet Association (NDCA) and the club now hosts some major regional tournaments and competitions, the NDCA Pennant Competition and also teaches and coaches school and college children from all over Bendigo. The club hosts the Victorian Teachers Games (welcoming teachers and players from all over Victoria) and will host the Special Olympics. Eaglehawk Croquet Club also runs regular "Come & Try" days.

Canterbury Park is also home to the Bendigo Leisure Centre, operated by the Bendigo Regional YMCA. This facility includes a 50-metre indoor swimming pool, a health club, mini golf and squash courts.

The Albert Roy Reserve has a baseball field, a badminton, a table tennis stadium and is home to the Roy Bateson Tennis Club.

A soccer field is located at the nearby Truscott Reserve.

The town has one golf course, the Neangar Park Golf Course.

From 1936 until 1978 Canterbury Park hosted greyhound racing.

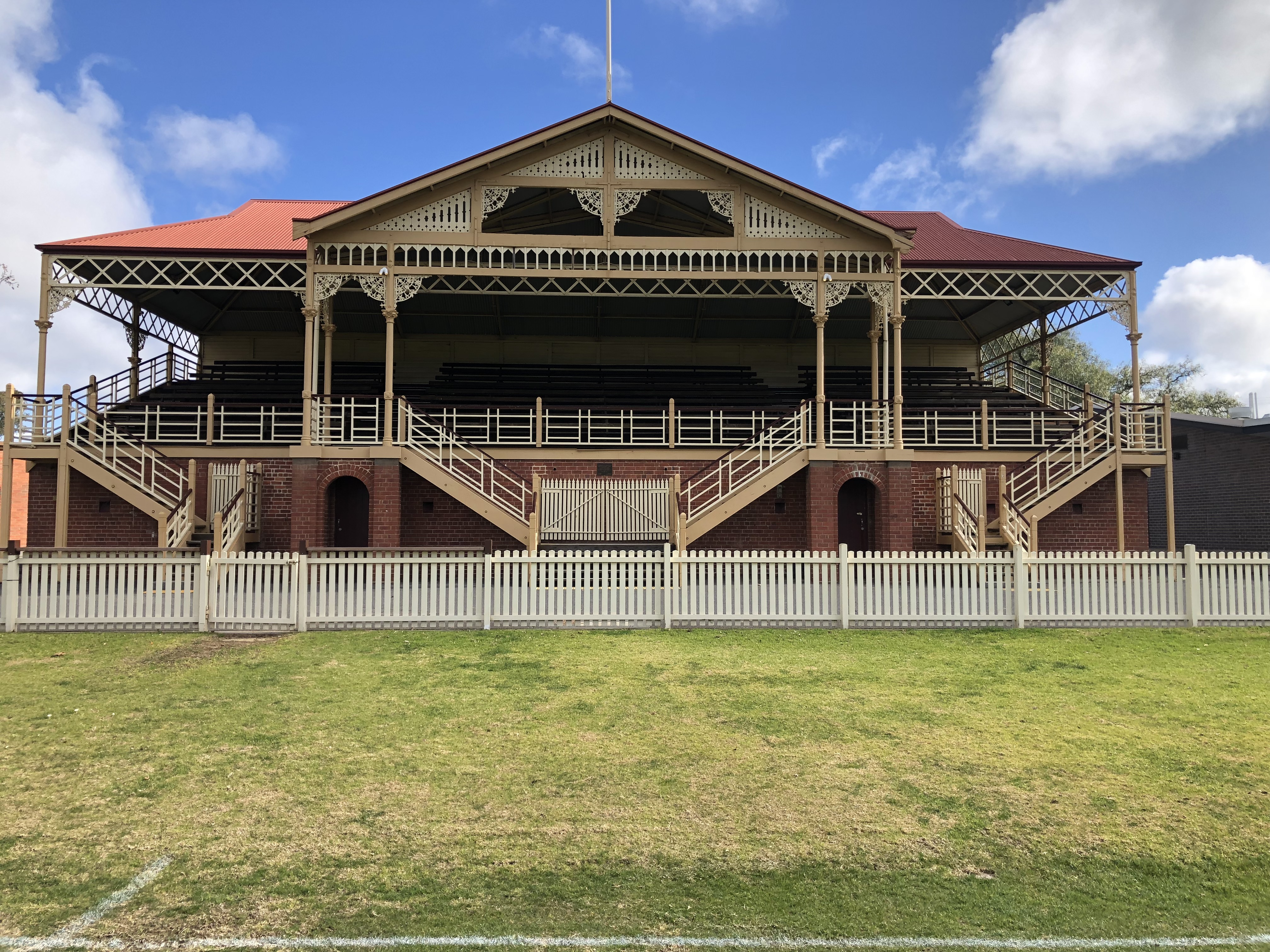
Canterbury Park Oval Grandstand, Eaglehawk

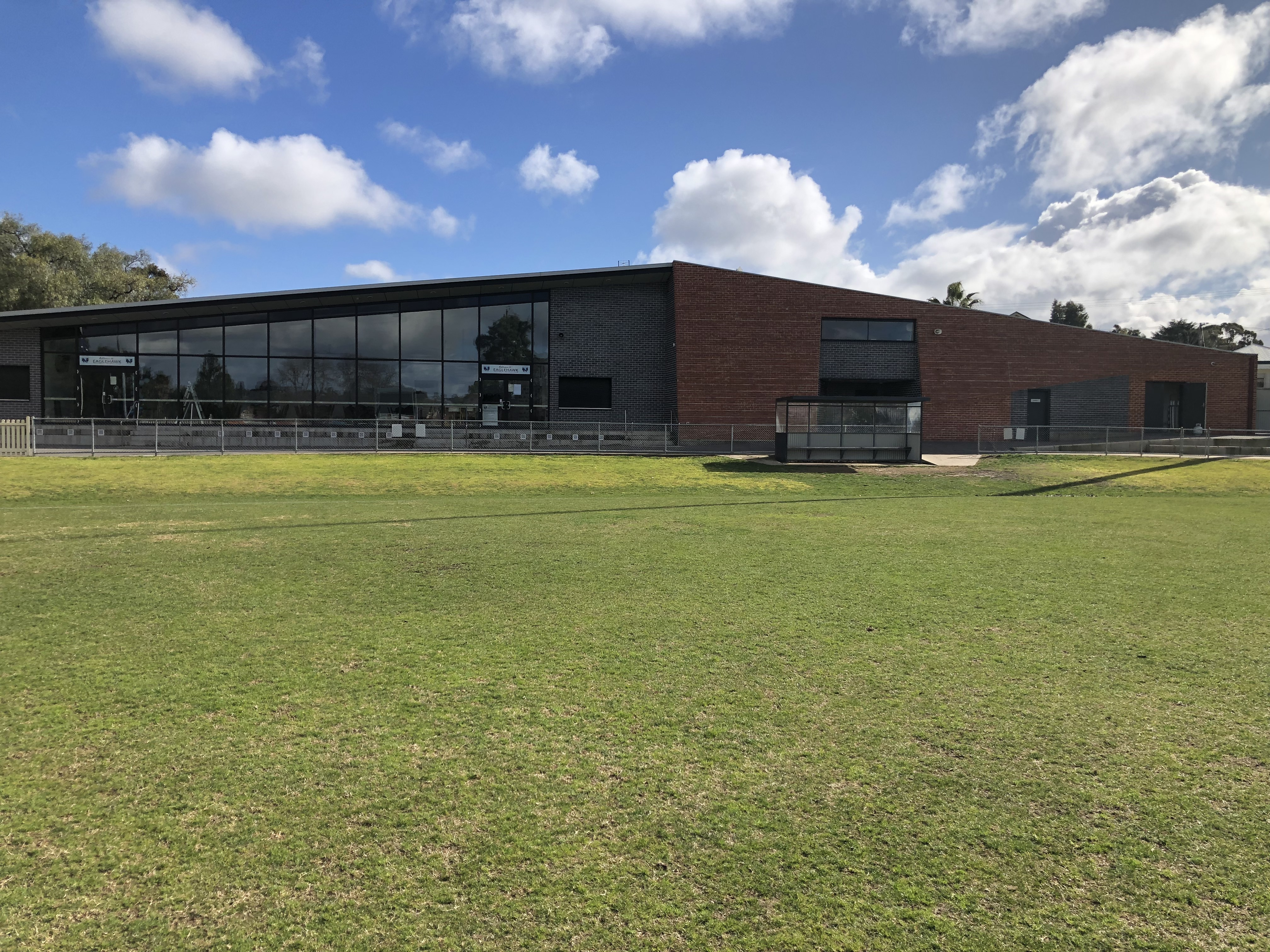
2015 new Eaglehawk FNC clubrooms, which replaced the old Bill Crawford Pavilion, built in 1961.

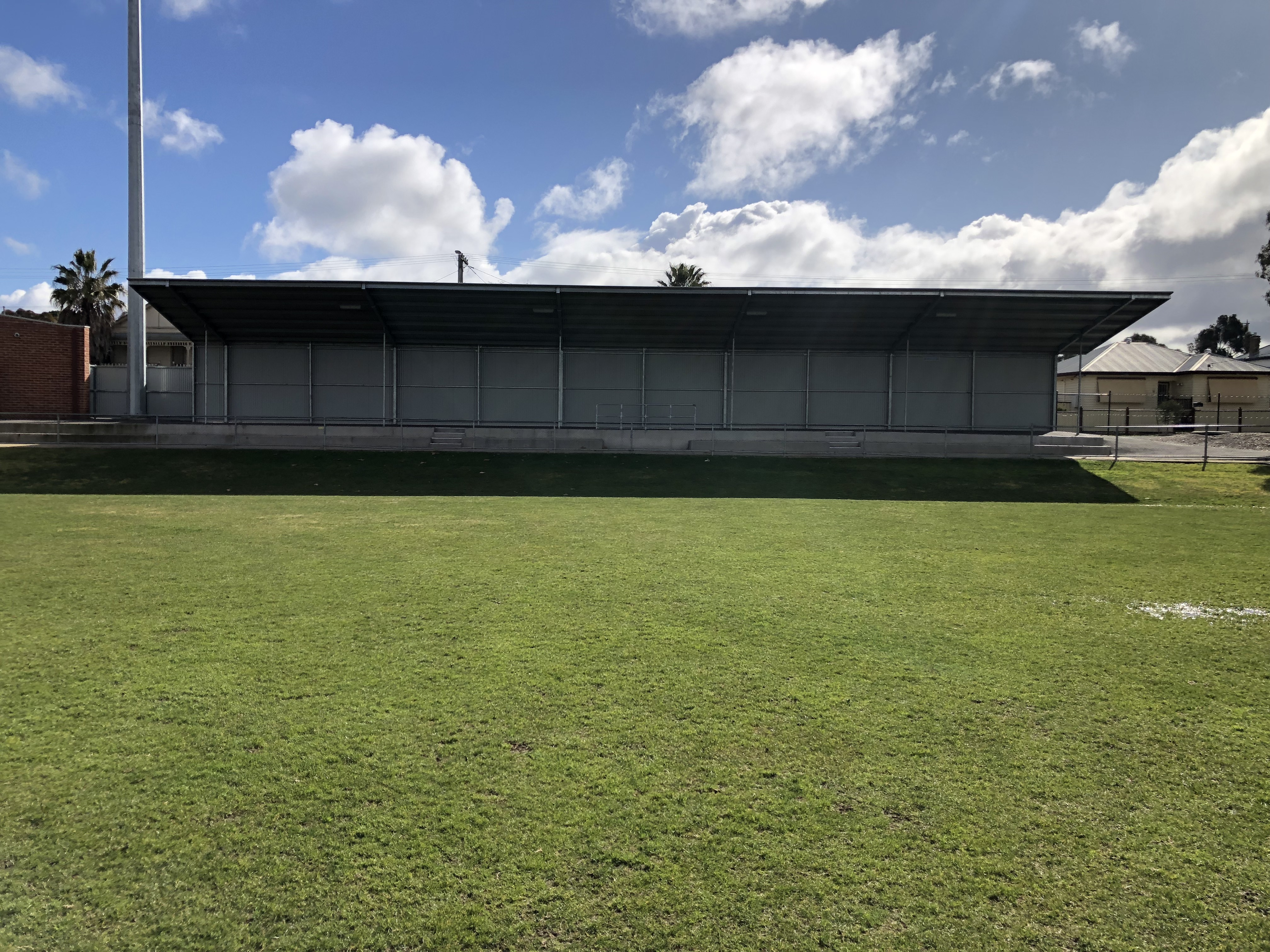
Canterbury Park Oval - All weather shelter

=== Other facilities ===
A community and day hospital, a 66-bed aged-care facility (St Laurence Court) is operated by Benetas. A fire station, which began to be constructed in 1900, and a police station are also located in Eaglehawk.

Eaglehawk is also home to the Star Cinema, a non-profit community-owned cinema located in the old Eaglehawk Town Hall.

1st Eaglehawk Scout Hall runs programs for Scouts on a Tuesday night and Cubs on a Thursday night, they are a part of Scouts Australia and have their hall available for hire to the general public.

== Events ==
The annual Dahlia and Arts Festival is held in March.

Annual Canterbury Carols are held in December

== Cultural references ==
The author Thomas Alexander Browne, better known by his pseudonym Rolf Boldrewood, wrote the novel The Sphinx of Eaglehawk: A Tale of Old Bendigo in 1895, based on his experiences as a station owner in the area. In one of A.B. "Banjo" Paterson's poems "Mulga Bill's Bicycle", first published in The Sydney Mail in 1896, Paterson introduces the eponymous character as "Mulga Bill, from Eaglehawk, that caught the cycling craze". The poem's local connection was recognised with the creation of the Mulga Bill Bicycle Trail, taking in many of the mining attractions, historic sites and modern day amenities of Eaglehawk.

== Notable residents ==
- William John Symons (1889–1948) - soldier and business man
- Edgar Charles Harris (1897–1964) - publisher
- Martin Victor Kennedy (1895–1952) - journalist and author
- John Brumby - premier of Victoria (2007–10) taught at Eaglehawk Secondary School
- Samuel Totten, internationally renowned scholar of genocide and humanitarian—taught at Eaglehawk Secondary School (1976–1978)
- Alby Rodda, Notable Australian Rules Footballer from the 1940s, was born in Eaglehawk.
- Bill Downie, Notable Australian Rules Footballer with Eaglehawk, Footscray and St. Kilda from the 1930s, died as a POW.

== Links ==
- Eaglehawk FNC website
- 1938 - Canterbury Park Greyhounds Official Programme cover
- 1950's? - Canterbury Park Greyhound Track photo
