= List of VFL debuts in 1955 =

The 1955 Victorian Football League (VFL) season was the 59th season of the VFL. The season saw 117 Australian rules footballers make their senior VFL debut and a further 7 transfer to new clubs having previously played in the VFL.

== Summary ==
Summary of debuts in 1944
Club	VFL debuts	Change of club
Carlton	13	0
Collingwood	5	1
Essendon	8	0
Fitzroy	10	0
Footscray	6	1
Geelong	5	0
Hawthorn	11	1
Melbourne	5	1
North Melbourne	16	0
Richmond	11	0
South Melbourne	10	1
St Kilda	17	2
Total	117	7

== Debuts ==
Name	Club	Age at debut	Round debuted	Games	Goals	Notes
Graham Donaldson	Carlton	19 years, 321 days	4	106	85	
Jack Sullivan	Carlton	21 years, 262 days	3	66	21	
Bob Bosustow	Carlton	20 years, 326 days	3	20	4	Father of Peter Bosustow.
Colin Holt	Carlton	21 years, 59 days	10	20	0	
Leon Berner	Carlton	19 years, 297 days	11	18	4	
Kevin Bergin	Carlton	18 years, 269 days	9	12	12	
Peter Aitken	Carlton	20 years, 156 days	1	11	7	
Jack Ellis	Carlton	21 years, 138 days	4	10	13	
John Cheffers	Carlton	18 years, 334 days	1	4	4	Son of Percy Cheffers.
Dave Browning	Carlton	21 years, 339 days	3	4	1	
John Paice	Carlton	23 years, 168 days	6	4	0	
Barry Archbold	Carlton	21 years, 238 days	16	2	0	
Barry Beitzel	Carlton	20 years, 236 days	17	2	0	
Ray Gabelich	Collingwood	21 years, 301 days	3	160	43	
Harry Sullivan	Collingwood	23 years, 8 days	1	78	5	Previously played for Carlton.
Bob Greve	Collingwood	20 years, 235 days	14	67	20	
Ken Smale	Collingwood	21 years, 162 days	1	60	98	
Laurie Rymer	Collingwood	20 years, 320 days	6	25	10	
John Elder	Collingwood	22 years, 282 days	3	2	0	
Robert Fox	Essendon	23 years, 165 days	1	52	34	
Doug Dench	Essendon	25 years, 77 days	1	27	0	
Graham Willey	Essendon	21 years, 306 days	6	17	35	
Don Carmichael	Essendon	18 years, 128 days	12	15	1	
Morton Diston	Essendon	18 years, 351 days	5	12	2	
Keith Chapman	Essendon	21 years, 128 days	12	6	1	
Warren Prest	Essendon	22 years, 128 days	1	3	0	
Ken Reed	Essendon	23 years, 136 days	3	2	0	
Kevin Murray	Fitzroy	16 years, 323 days	4	333	51	
Wally Clark	Fitzroy	19 years, 10 days	8	105	120	
Ron Smith	Fitzroy	20 years, 264 days	8	9	8	
Toby Elder	Fitzroy	20 years, 181 days	1	5	1	
Bob Collins	Fitzroy	18 years, 103 days	1	3	0	
Bobby Wilson	Fitzroy	20 years, 250 days	16	3	1	
Alan Anton	Fitzroy	22 years, 112 days	2	2	2	
John Charles	Fitzroy	19 years, 318 days	17	2	0	
Laurie Jarman	Fitzroy	20 years, 6 days	17	2	2	
Bill Smith	Fitzroy	18 years, 239 days	17	2	0	
Alex Gardiner	Footscray	20 years, 117 days	3	92	18	
John Westacott	Footscray	21 years, 348 days	14	34	0	
Kevin J. Smith	Footscray	20 years, 172 days	6	17	7	
Allan Clough	Footscray	22 years, 208 days	7	17	4	
Ron Dixon	Footscray	21 years, 185 days	4	10	0	
Kevin R. Smith	Footscray	22 years, 305 days	1	7	13	Previously played for North Melbourne
Frank McDowell	Footscray	21 years, 163 days	6	1	0	
Matt Goggin	Geelong	18 years, 269 days	1	88	5	
John O'Connell	Geelong	23 years, 39 days	1	81	65	
Clive Brown	Geelong	20 years, 357 days	4	72	4	
John Haygarth	Geelong	20 years, 361 days	12	59	13	
Geoff Umbers	Geelong	21 years, 202 days	6	7	2	
Graham Arthur	Hawthorn	18 years, 311 days	1	232	201	Hawthorn's first premiership captain. Son of Alan Arthur.
Ray Yeoman	Hawthorn	20 years, 197 days	2	74	47	
Don Gent	Hawthorn	22 years, 127 days	7	70	0	
Ian Hinks	Hawthorn	17 years, 346 days	1	16	3	
Bill Elsworth	Hawthorn	18 years, 334 days	11	10	4	
Brian Boland	Hawthorn	23 years, 299 days	6	6	0	Previously played for Richmond. Father of Glenn Boland.
Rod Horrocks	Hawthorn	21 years, 56 days	1	4	3	
Barry Takle	Hawthorn	20 years, 164 days	10	4	1	
Alan Jewell	Hawthorn	23 years, 98 days	7	2	0	
Leon Toohey	Hawthorn	20 years, 242 days	11	2	0	
Jeff Harris	Hawthorn	23 years, 263 days	6	1	0	
Ron Hoy	Hawthorn	22 years, 316 days	10	1	0	
Trevor Johnson	Melbourne	20 years, 95 days	3	118	9	
Athol Webb	Melbourne	19 years, 299 days	12	74	146	
Dick Atkinson	Melbourne	20 years, 325 days	6	7	0	
Ivan Baumgartner	Melbourne	21 years, 16 days	6	5	0	Previously played for Geelong.
Fred Webster	Melbourne	20 years, 4 days	2	3	2	
Kevin Clarke	Melbourne	23 years, 295 days	1	1	0	
John Dugdale	North Melbourne	19 years, 60 days	4	248	358	Father of Dean and Glenn Dugdale.
Max Ritchie	North Melbourne	20 years, 177 days	3	55	7	
Norm Dean	North Melbourne	21 years, 83 days	8	30	6	
John Ford	North Melbourne	23 years, 75 days	11	13	2	
Bill Reddick	North Melbourne	19 years, 177 days	4	12	0	
Bobby Burt	North Melbourne	20 years, 342 days	03	11	2	
John Joiner	North Melbourne	20 years, 315 days	3	11	0	
Jack Lawrence	North Melbourne	20 years, 288 days	1	9	3	
Brian O'Halloran	North Melbourne	17 years, 227 days	9	9	1	
Ron James	North Melbourne	22 years, 95 days	12	7	5	
Norm Neeson	North Melbourne	21 years, 114 days	9	5	0	
Peter Marchesi	North Melbourne	21 years, 299 days	3	3	0	
Peter Curtis	North Melbourne	22 years, 93 days	1	2	1	
John Wymer	North Melbourne	22 years, 109 days	5	2	0	
Bill Barton	North Melbourne	19 years, 102 days	10	2	2	
Keith Goullet	North Melbourne	22 years, 206 days	1	1	1	
Ted Langridge	Richmond	18 years, 211 days	6	94	149	
Ron McDonald	Richmond	21 years, 254 days	2	92	84	
Peter Morris	Richmond	21 years, 355 days	13	89	103	
Ray Allsop	Richmond	21 years, 159 days	7	54	69	
John Jenkins	Richmond	19 years, 139 days	12	34	34	
Charlie Flannagan	Richmond	21 years, 300 days	18	26	0	
John Claxton	Richmond	20 years, 177 days	3	15	18	
John Gorwell	Richmond	20 years, 77 days	3	9	0	
John Robson	Richmond	21 years, 299 days	4	6	4	
Neil Davies	Richmond	23 years, 128 days	1	2	1	
Ray Bloodworth	Richmond	21 years, 241 days	16	2	0	
Brian McGowan	South Melbourne	17 years, 196 days	13	118	171	
Hugh McLaughlin	South Melbourne	19 years, 234 days	8	116	5	
John Trethowan	South Melbourne	18 years, 184 days	3	81	13	
Bob Pratt	South Melbourne	19 years, 44 days	4	35	35	Son of Bob Pratt.
John Woolley	South Melbourne	19 years, 271 days	1	25	0	
John Ferguson	South Melbourne	24 years, 2 days	5	25	4	Previously played for Melbourne.
Frank Primmer	South Melbourne	22 years, 125 days	6	25	7	
Neil McNeill	South Melbourne	23 years, 125 days	11	11	1	
Ray Reed	South Melbourne	21 years, 48 days	9	10	1	
Des Barry	South Melbourne	21 years, 339 days	1	8	0	
Colin Vance	South Melbourne	25 years, 188 days	1	3	5	
Allan Jeans	St Kilda	21 years, 214 days	2	77	27	Coached St Kilda to their only VFL premiership.
Bill Gleeson	St Kilda	23 years, 293 days	2	15	11	
Milne McCooke	St Kilda	20 years, 259 days	10	13	8	
John Nelson	St Kilda	21 years, 109 days	6	11	0	
Gerry Burton	St Kilda	22 years, 64 days	1	10	0	
Stuart Lennie	St Kilda	18 years, 82 days	1	10	12	
Brian Gilmore	St Kilda	25 years, 171 days	6	10	2	Previously played for Essendon.
John Reeves	St Kilda	25 years, 247 days	4	8	1	Previously played for North Melbourne.
Allan Mennie	St Kilda	20 years, 17 days	5	8	0	
Merv Dihm	St Kilda	21 years, 270 days	9	8	0	
Max Stephenson	St Kilda	20 years, 91 days	16	7	0	
Mick McLaren	St Kilda	19 years, 13 days	1	4	0	
Jim Camm	St Kilda	23 years, 17 days	9	4	0	
Peter Allan	St Kilda	20 years, 125 days	5	3	0	
Ian Drohan	St Kilda	22 years, 295 days	9	3	0	
Ron Byron	St Kilda	23 years, 250 days	1	2	0	
Jim Jewitt	St Kilda	22 years, 84 days	3	2	1	
Alan Osborne	St Kilda	21 years, 138 days	5	1	0	
Jack Suttie	St Kilda	20 years, 280 days	12	1	1	
