= Kevin Smith (disambiguation) =

Kevin Smith (born 1970) is an American filmmaker, actor and comedian

Kevin Smith may also refer to:

== Sports ==
=== American football ===
- Kevin Smith (safety) (born 1967), American football player for the Pittsburgh Steelers
- Kevin Smith (tight end) (born 1969), American football player for the Los Angeles Raiders and the Green Bay Packers
- Kevin Smith (cornerback) (born 1970), American football player for the Dallas Cowboys
- Kevin Smith (running back) (born 1986), American football player
- Kevin Smith (wide receiver) (born 1991), American football wide receiver

=== Australian rules football ===
- Kevin R. Smith (1932–1991), Australian rules footballer for North Melbourne and Footscray
- Kevin J. Smith (1934–2018), Australian rules footballer for Footscray
- Kevin Smith (footballer, born 1942) (1942–2003), Australian rules footballer for Richmond

=== Other sports ===
- Kevin Smith (sailor) (born 1957), Canadian Olympic sailor
- Kevin Smith (cricketer) (born 1957), English cricketer
- Kevin Smith (canoeist) (born 1961), British sprint canoer
- Kevin Smith (speedway rider) (born 1961), English speedway rider
- Kevin Smith (footballer, born 1987), Scottish football player
- Kevin Smith (soccer) (fl. 1990s), American soccer player
- Kevin Smith (baseball) (born 1996), American baseball player
- Kevin Smith (pitcher) (born 1997), American baseball player

== Entertainment ==
- Kevin M. Smith (1990–2024), American character actor who appeared in films by Brian Patrick Butler
- Kevin Max (Kevin Max Smith, born 1967), American singer and member of dc Talk
- Kevin Smith (Australian actor) (1953–2005), Australian stage actor
- Kevin Smith (musician) (born 1956), American keyboardist
- Kevin Smith (New Zealand actor) (1963–2002), New Zealand actor best known for playing Ares on Xena: Warrior Princess
- Kevin Smith (South African actor), South African actor best known for playing Frank Xavier on Isidingo
- Lovebug Starski (Kevin Smith, 1960-2018), American rapper
- Kojaque (Kevin Smith, born 1995), Irish rapper

== Other people ==
- Kevin Smith (businessman) (born 1954), British businessman
- Kevin Smith (conservationist) (1953–2005), New Zealand conservationist
- Kevin Smith (editor), British science fiction editor and activist
- Kevin H. Smith (born 1977), former New Hampshire state legislator

== See also ==
- Kevin Smyth, Canadian ice hockey player
- Kevin Smyth (rugby league), Australian rugby league player
