= Val Marchesi =

Australian rules footballer (1900–1970)

Personal information
- Full name: Aubrey Valentine Marchesi
- Born: 6 March 1900; Goornong, Victoria
- Died: 19 January 1970 (aged 69); Parkville, Victoria
- Original team: South Bendigo
- Height: 178 cm (5 ft 10 in)
- Weight: 83 kg (183 lb)

Playing career^{1}
Years	Club	Games (Goals)
1922	Geelong	15 (4)
1923–24	Essendon	8 (0)
Total		23 (4)
- ^{1} Playing statistics correct to the end of 1924.

Aubrey Valentine "Val" Marchesi (6 March 1900 – 19 January 1970) was an Australian rules footballer who played with Geelong and Essendon in the Victorian Football League (VFL).

== Career ==
Marchesi came to Geelong from Bendigo in 1922 and impressed during training. The Geelong Advertiser compared him to Collingwood's Bill Twomey, for his dash and ground work. He made 15 appearances for Geelong in the 1922 VFL season.

It would be his only season at Geelong, he crossed to Essendon in 1923 and played seven league games that year, including the club's semi final loss to South Melbourne at the Melbourne Cricket Ground. In 1924 he appeared only in round two, a draw against Carlton.

Marchesi, a half-forward, joined North Melbourne's training list in 1925.

In 1926 he played seconds football with Carlton and was a member of their premiership team.

Marchesi next played in the Victorian Football Association (VFA), first with Coburg in 1927, before he joined Port Melbourne the following season.

== Family ==
Marchesi's father, Coszen Marchesi, was an immigrant from northern Italy, who came to Australia in 1884.

Two of his sons played in the VFL for North Melbourne. Elder son Gerald Marchesi captained the club in 1954, his final season. The following year Gerald's brother Peter Marchesi played all three of his league games.

His surname is pronounced "Markayzee".
