= Dugdale (disambiguation) =

Dugdale is a last name.

Dugdale may also refer to:

- The Dugdale Centre, an arts centre in London, UK
- Dugdale Field, a defunct stadium in Seattle, Washington, United States
- Dugdale Glacier, Antarctica
- Dugdale, Minnesota, an unincorporated community in Polk County, Minnesota, United States
- PS Thomas Dugdale, British paddle steamer passenger vessel
- Dugdale Society, English text publication society
