= Ron Dixon =

Ron Dixon may refer to:

- Ron Dixon (Brookside), in the UK TV soap opera Brookside, played by Vince Earl
- Ron Dixon (American football) (born 1976), American football wide receiver
- Ron Dixon (Australian footballer) (born 1933), Australian rules footballer
- Ron Dixon (businessman) (died 2000), Canadian businessman

== See also ==
- Ronnie Dixon (born 1971), American football player
- Ronald Audley Martineau Dixon (1871–1960), British natural historian, antiquarian and author
