= Trethowan =

Trethowan is a Cornish surname, found both in Cornwall and amongst members of the Cornish diaspora. People with the name include:

- Anthony Trethowan (1945–2015), Australian politician
- Arthur Trethowan (1863–1937), Australian politician
- Ian Trethowan (1922–1990), British television executive
- Illtyd Trethowan (1907–1993), British religious philosopher
- John Trethowan (born 1936), Australian rules footballer
- Pat Trethowan (born 1941), Australian rules footballer
- Rebecca Trethowan (born 1985), New Zealand rugby union player
- Perry Trethowan, a fictional detective in a series of books by Robert Barnard
- Sir William Trethowan ( ) British professor of psychiatry, Birmingham University

== See also ==
- Trethowan's sign
