= Mennie =

Mennie is a surname. Notable people with the surname include:

- Allan Mennie (born 1935), Australian rules footballer
- Donald Mennie (1875–1944), Scottish businessman and amateur photographer
- Frank Mennie (1923–1997), Scottish footballer
- Joe Mennie (born 1988), Australian cricketer
- John Mennie (1911–1982), Scottish artist
- Vince Mennie (born 1964), Scottish–German footballer
