= Thearne =

Hamlet in the East Riding of Yorkshire, England

Coordinates: 53.8164°N 0.3686°W

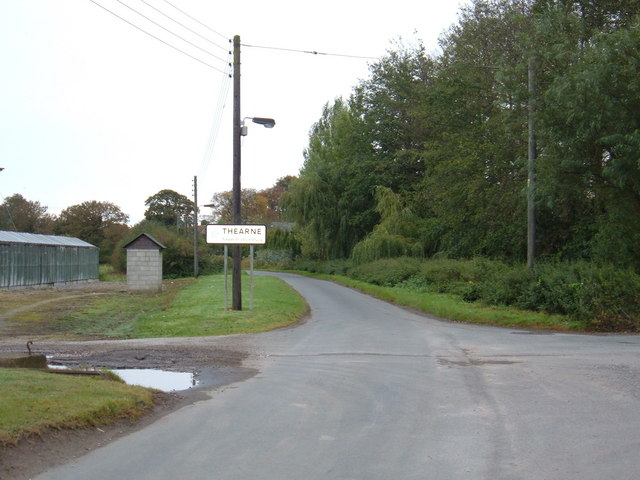
- Ferry Lane, Thearne

- Location within the East Riding of Yorkshire
- OS grid reference: TA075368
- Civil parish: Woodmansey
- Unitary authority: East Riding of Yorkshire
- Ceremonial county: East Riding of Yorkshire
- Region: Yorkshire and the Humber
- Country: England
- Sovereign state: United Kingdom
- Post town: HULL
- Postcode district: HU7
- Dialling code: 01482
- Police: Humberside
- Fire: Humberside
- Ambulance: Yorkshire
- UK Parliament: Beverley and Holderness

Thearne is a hamlet and former civil parish, now in the parish of Woodmansey, in the East Riding of Yorkshire, England. In 1931 the parish had a population of 183.

It is situated approximately 3.5 miles (5.6 km) south-east of Beverley to the east of the A1174 road from Hull to Beverley. It also lies just to the west of the River Hull.

== Geography ==
Thearne lies between the A1174 Beverley to Hull road, and the River Hull, around 3.5 miles (5.6 km) south-east of Beverley. The original village is located at the meeting of three minor roads: Thearne Road (now Ferry Lane) and Thearne Lane (formerly Old Wire Carr Road) to the west, and Ferry Lane to the east. The modern place includes additional housing along the A1174.

The area around Thearne is primarily agricultural, low lying (less than 16 feet (5 m) above sea level), with extensive drainage. There are several developments of glasshouse based agriculture in the area.

=== Governance ===
The hamlet is in the Beverley and Holderness parliamentary constituency.

Thearne was formerly a township in the parish of Beverley St. John, in 1866 Thearne became a civil parish, on 1 April 1935 the parish was abolished to form Woodmansey.

== History ==
The name 'Thearne' is a reference to the Thorn tree and was recorded as early as the late 13th century. A ferry east of Thearne across the River Hull dates to at least the 12th century. In the 15th century a chapel dedicated to the Blessed Virgin was established. The chapel was confiscated during Henry VIII's suppression, and is no longer in existence.

Flooding of the Beverley-Hull road led to orders for an improvement of the area's drainage in the 17th century. The land around Thearne was enclosed by the Beverley, &c. Inclosure Act 1785 (25 Geo. 3. c. 48 Pr.). The Beverley and Barmston Drain was constructed through the area in around 1800, but does not actively drain Thearne. A windmill for corn, Thearne Windmill, south-west of the village on the Beverley-Hull road was constructed sometime around 1800. An earlier mill existed in the 17th century, the new mill had steam power installed in 1856.

In 1821 the population of Thearne was 90; by around 1833 the township had a population of 67. In the 1850s Thearne consisted of less than 10 main buildings, including Thearne Hall (built c. 1823). A Primitive Methodist chapel was built in 1867. Ferry Road led east to the River Hull where the ferry ('Waghen ferry' later 'Wawne Ferry') crossed to the Anchor Inn (later the Windham Arms), and to the road to Wawne.

By the 1920s Thearne Windmill was out of use. The ferry closed in August 1946 when the Windham Arms Public House at Wawne, from where it operated, was sold to Moors' and Robson's Brewery. Their new tenant, Walter Twidale, reported that the ferry boat was no longer safe to use, as recorded by Ronald Dixon, the chairman of Woodmansey Parish Council, in the council minutes of December 1946. A waste water treatment works for Woodmansey and Thearne was constructed in the 1950s, north-east of the village. The Methodist chapel closed in 1968.

Glasshouse agriculture developed extensively around Wawne in the second half of the 20th century.

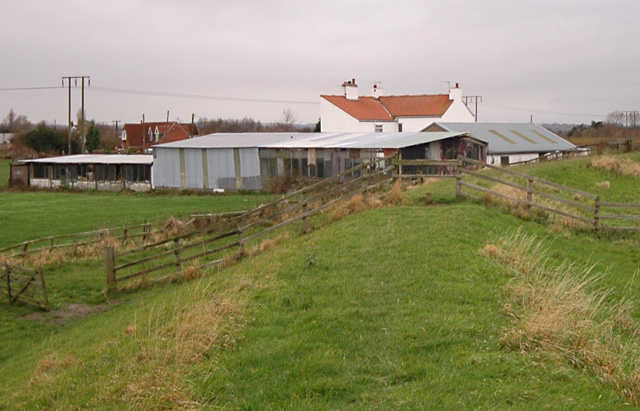
Prospect farm and the bank of the River Hull

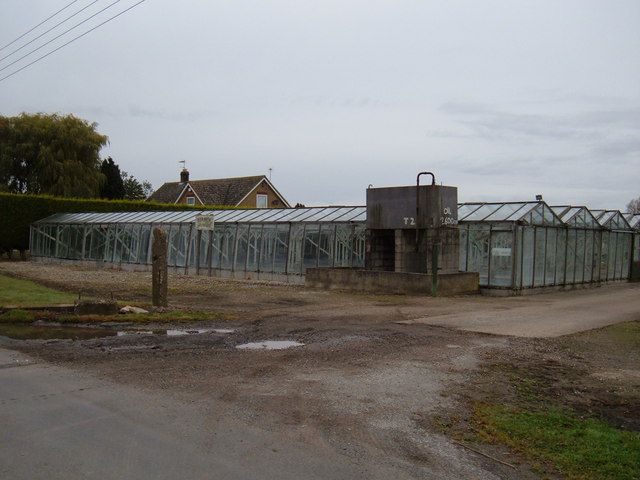
Glasshouses at Thearne

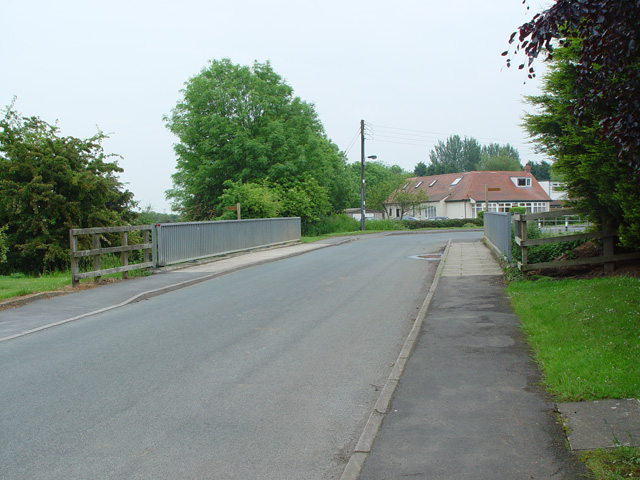
Ferry Lane road bridge over the Beverley and Barmston Drain
