= Dugdale =

Dugdale is an English surname and may refer to:

- Adam Dugdale (born 1987), English footballer
- Alan Dugdale (born 1952), English footballer
- Alex Dugdale, American saxophonist and jazz performer
- Andrew Dugdale, fictional former Prime Minister of Australia in The Ex-PM
- Arthur Dugdale (1869–1941), British Army officer
- Blanche Dugdale (1880–1948), British author and Zionist
- Dan Dugdale (1864–1934), American baseball player
- Dean Dugdale (born 1963), former Australian rules footballer
- Dugdale Stratford Dugdale (1773–1836), British politician
- Edgar Dugdale (c. 1872–1964), English translator
- Florence Dugdale (1879–1937, Max Gate), English writer of children's stories and the second wife of Thomas Hardy
- Frederic Brooks Dugdale, British soldier
- Glenn Dugdale (born 1961), former Australian rules footballer
- Guy Dugdale (1905–1982), British bobsledder
- Henrietta Dugdale, Australian activist
- James Dugdale, Oxford academic of the 16th century
- James Dugdale, 2nd Baron Crathorne (born 1939), British art dealer
- Jimmy Dugdale (1932–2008), English footballer
- John Dugdale (photographer) (born 1960), American art photographer
- John Dugdale (footballer), Australian rules player for North Melbourne
- John Dugdale (Conservative politician) (1835–1920), English politician
- John Dugdale (herald) (1628–1700), herald at the College of Arms, London, England
- John Dugdale (Labour politician) (1905–1963), British newspaper journalist and politician
- John Marshall Dugdale (1851–1918), English rugby union international
- Sir John Dugdale Astley, 1st Baronet (1778–1842), English politician
- Sir John Dugdale Astley, 3rd Baronet (1828–1894), English soldier and sportsman
- Joshua Dugdale (born 1974), British documentary film-maker
- Ken Dugdale, soccer coach from New Zealand
- Kezia Dugdale, Scottish politician
- Mark Dugdale, professional body builder
- Michael Dugdale, fictional character in Utopia
- Paul Dugdale (born 1967), British Circuit judge
- Richard Dugdale (alleged demoniac) (born c.1670), English gardener and servant
- Richard Louis Dugdale (1841–1883), American sociologist
- Rick Dugdale, Canadian film producer
- Robert Dugdale (pseudonym for Henry Hardy), British publisher.
- Rose Dugdale (1941–2024), English heiress who joined the Provisional Irish Republican Army
- Sam Dugdale (born 2000), English rugby union player
- Sarah Dugdale (born 1995), Canadian actress
- Sasha Dugdale (born 1974), British poet, playwright, and translator
- Stephen Dugdale (1640?-1683), English informer and figure of the Popish Plot
- Stewart Dugdale (born 1976), English film score composer
- Thomas Dugdale, 1st Baron Crathorne, British politician
- Thomas Cantrell Dugdale (1880–1952), British artist
- Una Dugdale, maiden name of Una Duval (1879–1975), British suffragette and marriage reformer
- William Dugdale (1605–1686), antiquarian
- Sir William Dugdale, 2nd Baronet (1922–2014), former chairman of Aston Villa F.C.
- William Dugdale (publisher) (1800–1868), English publisher of pornographic literature
- William Stratford Dugdale (1800–1871), English politician

== See also ==
- Dugdale baronets
