= London theatre =

London theatre may refer to:

- West End theatre
- Off West End
