= Dunswell =

Village in the East Riding of Yorkshire, England

Coordinates: 53.801362°N 0.371749°W

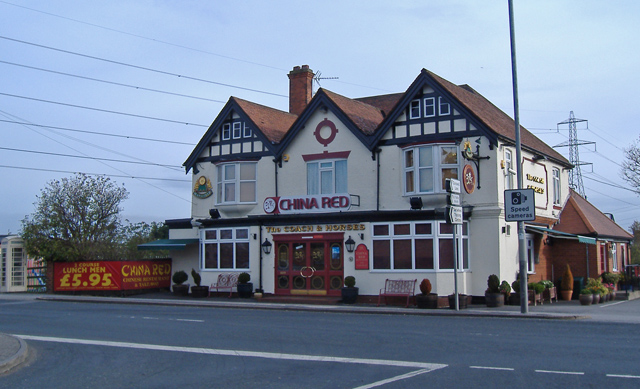
- Coach and Horses

- Location within the East Riding of Yorkshire
- OS grid reference: TA073351
  - London: 155 mi (249 km) S
- Civil parish: Woodmansey
- Unitary authority: East Riding of Yorkshire
- Ceremonial county: East Riding of Yorkshire
- Region: Yorkshire and the Humber
- Country: England
- Sovereign state: United Kingdom
- Post town: HULL
- Postcode district: HU6
- Dialling code: 01482
- Police: Humberside
- Fire: Humberside
- Ambulance: Yorkshire
- UK Parliament: Beverley and Holderness

Dunswell is a village in the East Riding of Yorkshire, England, and in the civil parish of Woodmansey.

Historically also known as Beer-Houses due to the presence of two inns in close proximity, the village is located on the main Kingston upon Hull to Beverley road. A significant drinking water extraction works was opened in 1931 west of the village, helping to supplying Hull and the surrounding area.

== Geography ==
Dunswell is situated at the junction of Dunswell Lane and A1174 road Hull to Beverley road approximately 4 and 3.5 miles (6.4 and 5.6 km) from the centres of Kingston upon Hull and Beverley respectively. It is approximately 440 yards (400 m) west of the River Hull; the Beverley and Barmston Drain also runs north–south, adjacent to the west of the village.

The village has a hall, Dunswell Village Institute; and a primary school Dunswell Primary, since 2014 Dunswell Academy.

The Ship Inn is located at the junction of the main road and Ings Lane leading to Skidby Landing on the River Hull. (Note: There was once a ferry across the Hull at Dunswell (1913).)

== Governance ==
The village is in the Beverley and Holderness parliamentary constituency.

== History ==
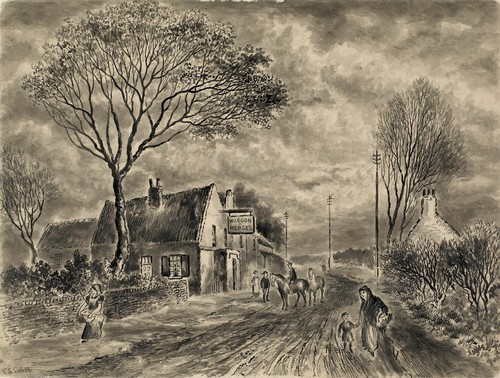
The "Wagon and Horses" Inn, Dunswell (F.S. Smith, c. 1900)

According to Charles Overton, Dunswell was once known as Douceville, a reference to its many springs and wells. At one time it was also known as Beer-Houses due to the two public houses in close vicinity. The two pubs in the village, The Coach and Horses (a.k.a. The Plough) and The Wagon and Horses, (Note: Replaced with houses. demolished in the early 20th century,) are thought to originate from the 17th century. The Hull to Beverley road was turn-piked in 1741.

The Saint John in Beverley and Skidby, Yorkshire (Drainage) Act 1785 (25 Geo. 3. c. 92) allowed the construction of the Beverley and Skidby Drain, and the Beverley and Barmston Drain allowed by the East Riding Drainage Act 1798 (38 Geo. 3. c. lxiii). (Note: The Skidby Drain passed east of the village, the much larger Barmston Drain west of the village.) In 1880 improvements to the lower reaches of the drainage system enabled further extraction, and a steam engine for drainage was installed at Dunswell for the Skidby Drain. The drainage of the land reduced flooding, but caused some local wells to become dry.

In around 1814 a non-conformist chapel ("Bethel") was built in the village for the Methodist New Connexion branch. In the 1850s the village consisted of two Inns on the Hull and Beverley road, with the village west along Dunswell Lane, with fewer than twenty houses. The village school opened in 1881.

In 1893 the Newington Water Company gained authorisation to open a water supply works at Dunswell to replace a source at Swanland that had become contaminated by salt. The company was taken over by the Hull Corporation shortly after. In 1911 permission was given for additional water works at Dunswell, and after being halted by the First World War, they were restarted in 1923 on a larger scale – the water pumping station was opened in 1931. (Note: The main pumping station building was a white concrete structure resembling an Egyptian temple. (see Egyptian Revival architecture.) The above ground building was demolished in 1987.) The works included a 16-foot (4.9 m) diameter well, with 5,200 feet (1,600 m) of adits. The works was one of the three main water supplies for the area, along with Springhead Pumping Station and Mill Dam in Cottingham. The adit system was expanded in the early 1950s to meet demand from the borough of Beverley but the works did not yield an increase in supply.

St Faith's Church of England church opened in 1951; the non-conformist chapel held its last service in 1968.

Low level housing development took place in the second half of the 20th century, with houses on Ings Lane, and houses and new cul-de-sac streets south of the Dunwell Lane/Beverley Road junction (The Meadows, Dene Close). In 1985 the village became part of the civil parish of Woodmansey.

Hull Livestock Market, the last remaining livestock market in East Yorkshire, has been located in the village since 2002.

In 2013 Dunswell primary school was listed for closure by East Riding of Yorkshire Council; the closure, which was opposed by many nearby residents was averted by transferring to academy status, as a subsidiary of the primary school in Swanland.

== Gallery ==
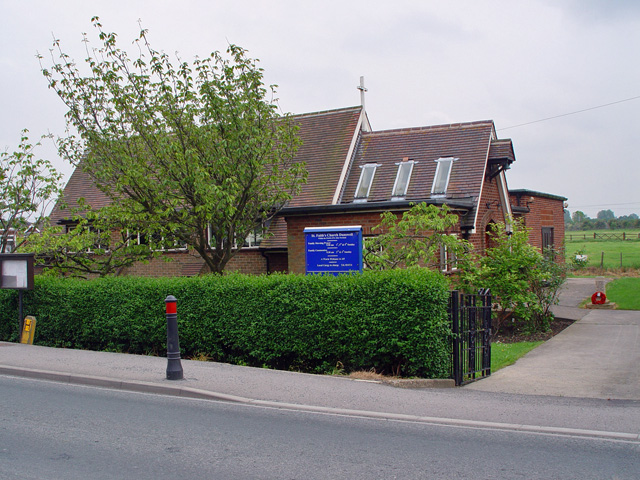
St Faiths Church (2008)

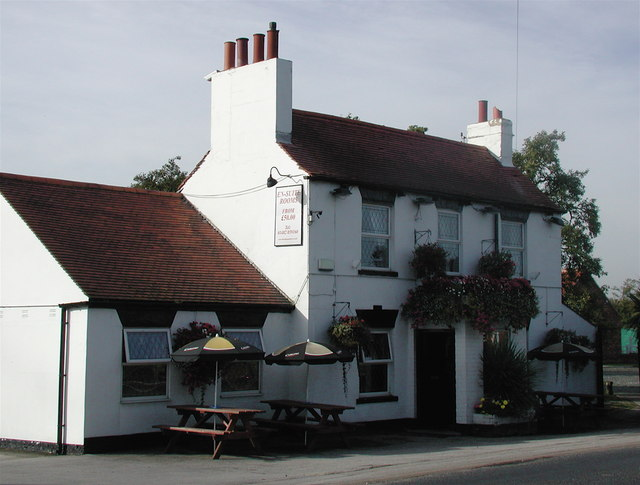
The Ship Inn (2006)

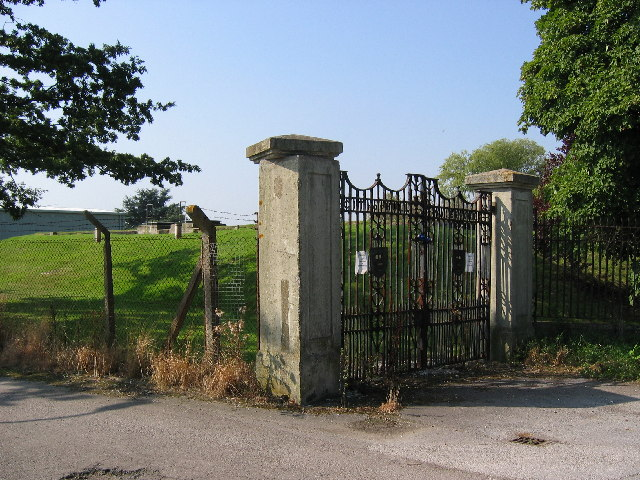
Gates to the enclosed water reservoir (2005)

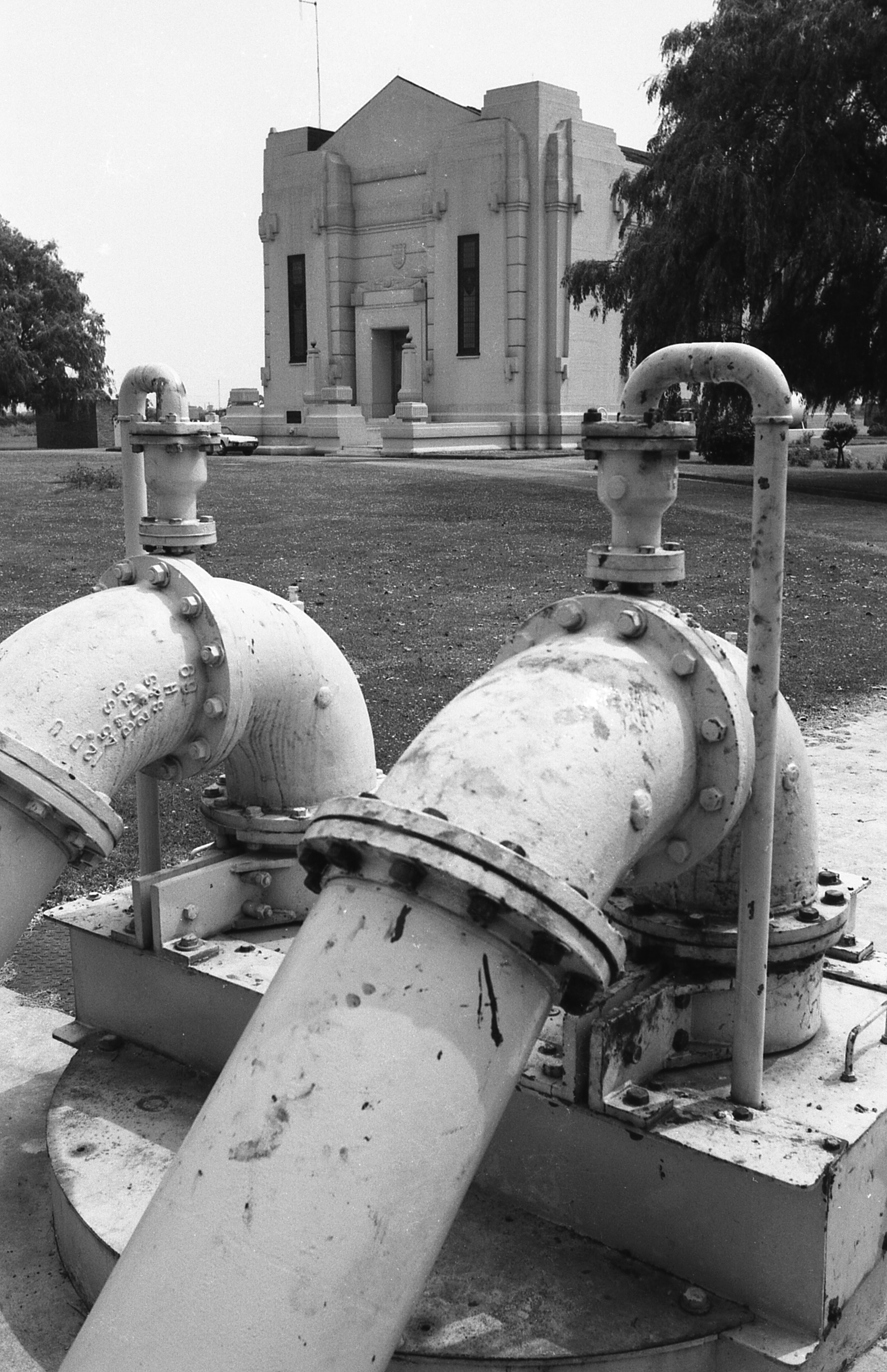
Dunswell pumping station exterior (1976) (now demolished)
