= Millfield Arts Centre =

Arts centre in Enfield, London, England

Coordinates: 51.6164°N 0.0813°W

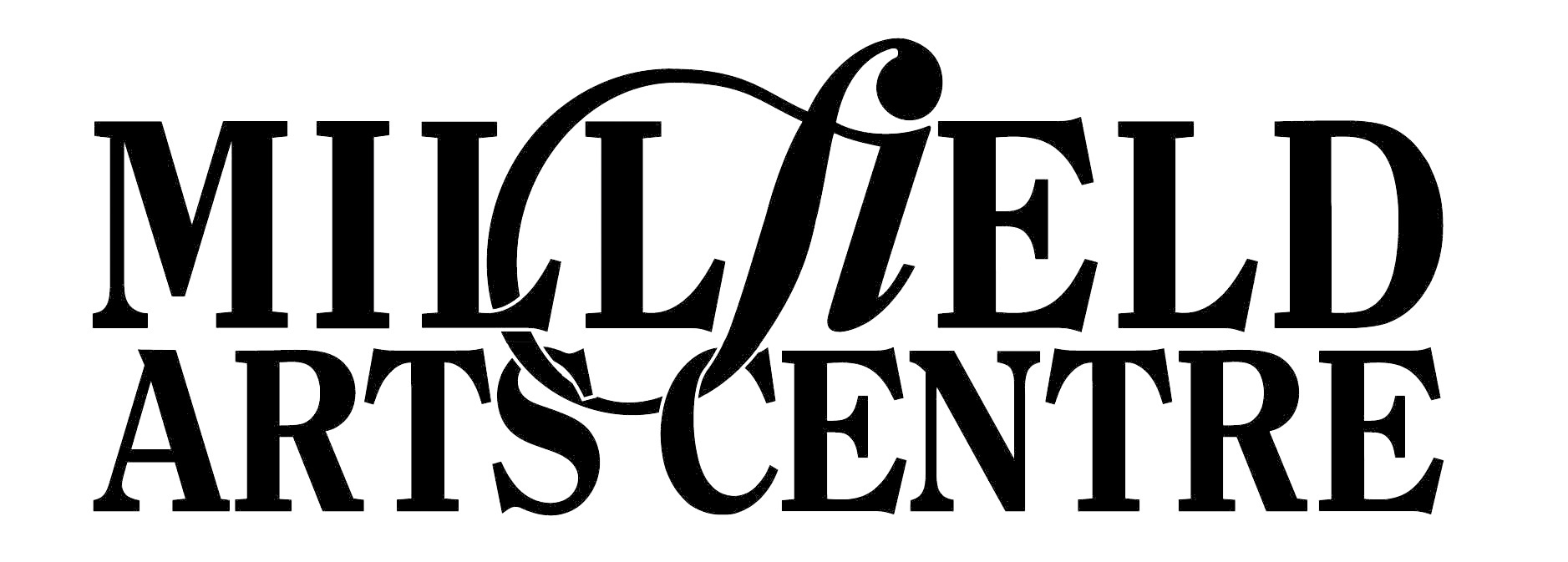
Millfield Theatre - Millfield House -Dugdale Centre

Millfield Arts Centre comprises Millfield Theatre and Millfield House in Edmonton and The Dugdale Centre in Enfield Town.

It is owned by London Borough of Enfield Council.
