= London stage =

London stage may refer to:

- West End theatre
- Off West End
