= Ray Reed =

Ray Reed may refer to:

- Ray Reed (racing driver)
- Ray Reed (footballer)
- Ray Reed (Missouri politician), American politician in Missouri
- E. Ray Reed, American politician in West Virginia

== See also ==
- Ray Reid, American college soccer coach
