= Ronald Audley Martineau Dixon =

Ronald Audley Martineau Dixon of Thearne Hall (1871-1960) was a British natural historian, antiquarian and author on historic subjects. His views were extremely right-wing and would now been seen as lacking any sense of political correctness and he was extremely outspoken.

== Life ==
He was born around 1871 in England, the son of the Rev. James M. Dixon, a Unitarian minister in Hull. He was described as "a gentleman of independent means" having no need to work and having a considerable income from property and shares. This allowed him to spend his life in academic pursuits and writing.

In 1912, he was living at 46 Marlborough Avenue in Hull. In later life, his address is given as Wolfreton Hall in Kirk Ella, East Yorkshire. He is listed as a district councillor in the nearby town of Woodmansey.

Despite what would now be seen as quite extreme views, he was well-respected in the 1920s and, in 1923, he was elected a Fellow of the Royal Society of Edinburgh. His proposers were John MacKintosh MacKay Munro, Andrew Thomson (1850-1930), Frank Watson Young and Basil Alexander Pilkington.

He died on 17 July 1960.

== Publications ==
- Priestley's Daughter and Her Descendants (1931)
- Some Letters of the Rev Dr Joseph Priestley (1933)
- William Wilberforce: Being the History of the Pious Shrimp who set the Negro Race Free from Slavery (1933)
- Adult Education in East Yorkshire 1875-1960 (1960, published 1965)
