= Listed buildings in Woodmansey =

Woodmansey is a civil parish in the county of the East Riding of Yorkshire, England. It contains seven listed buildings that are recorded in the National Heritage List for England. Of these, one is listed at Grade II*, the middle of the three grades, and the others are at Grade II, the lowest grade. The parish contains the village of Woodmansey and the surrounding area. The listed buildings consist of a farmhouse and farm buildings, houses, and a lantern turret moved from a church.

== Key ==
Grade	Criteria
II*	Particularly important buildings of more than special interest
II	Buildings of national importance and special interest

== Buildings ==
Name and location	Photograph	Date	Notes	Grade
Lantern turret 53.82740°N 0.39783°W	—	c. 1400	The lantern turret was moved from St Mary's Church, Beverley, during its restoration, into the garden of 4 King Street in 1851. It has an octagonal plan, and tall pierced openings with a transom.	II*
Old Farm; 53.81857°N 0.42050°W		Late 17th to early 18th century	The farmhouse is in red brick, with a deep moulded brick cornice and a pantile roof, hipped on the left. It partly has one storey and an attic, and partly two storeys, and seven bays. The doorway has a fanlight, and most of the windows are sashes. There is also a mullioned and a transomed window, partly blocked, a later inserted window, and a small roof dormer.	II
Gate piers, Low Farm; 53.81863°N 0.42033°W	—	Late 17th to early 18th century	The gate piers are in rusticated red brick and have a square plan. They have limestone rebates, pyramidal caps and flagstone coping.	II
Barn, Low Farm; 53.81874°N 0.42037°W		Early 18th century	The barn is in red brick, with a deep eaves cornice of rubbed, dentilled, and cogged bricks in bands, and a pantile roof with tumbled-in brick to the raised gables. There is a single storey and three bays. The openings include a doorway under a blank oval opening, a cart entry and a sash window.	II
Garden walls, Low Farm; 53.81875°N 0.42242°W	—	Early 18th century	The walls, which enclose a square garden, are in red brick with limestone dressings. They have buttresses and offsets, and brick coping.	II
Chalk Villa; 53.82871°N 0.44117°W	—	c. 1800	The house is in chalk, rendered and colourwashed, with a hipped slate roof. There are two storeys and three bays, the outer bays forming full-height bows. The central doorway has a fanlight with radial glazing, flanked by sash windows, and there is another sash window above it.	II
White Hall; 53.82098°N 0.42448°W	—	Late 18th to early 19th century	The house is in brick, with a floor band, an embattled parapet, and a roof with tumbled-in brick to the plain close verges. There are two storeys and five bays. The doorway has a fanlight with Y-tracery in an ogee-headed opening, and on the right is sash window with an ogee head. To its left is a two-storey canted bay window. Elsewhere, there are sash windows, those on the ground floor with wedge lintels, and blank oculi.	II
