= Ivan Baumgartner =

Australian rules footballer (1934–2020)

Personal information
- Full name: Ivan Ernst Baumgartner
- Born: 11 March 1934
- Died: 30 December 2020 (aged 86)
- Original team: Wesley College
- Height: 179 cm (5 ft 10 in)
- Weight: 83 kg (183 lb)

Playing career^{1}
Years	Club	Games (Goals)
1953–1955	Geelong	27 (3)
1955	Melbourne	5 (0)
1956	St Kilda	16 (1)
Total		48 (4)
- ^{1} Playing statistics correct to the end of 1956.

Ivan Ernst Baumgartner (11 March 1934 – 30 December 2020) was an Australian rules footballer who played with Geelong, Melbourne and St Kilda in the Victorian Football League (VFL).

After studying at Wesley College, Baumgartner moved to Geelong, in order to attend the Gordon Institute of Technology. While there he played with the Geelong Football Club. In 1953, his first season, he appeared in Geelong's preliminary final win over Footscray. He lost his place in the side for the grand final, to make way for Russell Renfrey, and had to watch his club's defeat of Collingwood from beyond the sidelines. The following year he was a regular member of the team and played a total of 17 games, including two more finals, but not a grand final.

Baumgartner participated in the opening three rounds of the 1955 VFL season, then asked for a clearance to Melbourne, as he had found work in Dandenong. He played only five senior games for Melbourne, but performed well enough in the reserves to finish second in the 1955 Gardiner Medal.

He finished his career at St Kilda, playing 16 of a possible 18 games for them in 1956.
