= Milne McCooke =

Australian rules footballer

Personal information
- Full name: Milne Norman McCooke
- Born: 9 October 1934
- Died: 23 December 2010 (aged 76)
- Original team: Caulfield City
- Height: 185 cm (6 ft 1 in)
- Weight: 92 kg (203 lb)

Playing career^{1}
Years	Club	Games (Goals)
1955–1958	St Kilda	13 (8)
- ^{1} Playing statistics correct to the end of 1958.

Milne Norman McCooke (9 October 1934 – 23 December 2010) was an Australian rules footballer who played with St Kilda in the Victorian Football League (VFL).

McCooke, a Caulfield City recruit, made his debut for St Kilda in the 1955 VFL season. Used mostly as a follower or forward, McCooke kicked three goals for St Kilda in his second league game, a win over North Melbourne at Junction Oval, which ended a 12-game losing streak. He played seven games that season, then only seconds fixtures in 1956, followed by three senior appearances in 1957 and another three in 1958.

The next stage of his career was spent at Oakleigh in the Victorian Football Association (VFA), where he was a premiership player in 1960 and won a best and fairest award in 1962.

McCooke was coach of Wimmera Football League club Murtoa from 1964 to 1967, before spending a season at VFA club Caulfield, playing three games in an injury and suspension affected year.

In 1969 McCooke led a young Kooweerup side to a 25-point grand final victory over Longwarry at Cora Lynn football ground and coached the Caulfield reserves in 1975 and Victorian Amateur Football Association (VAFA) club Ormond Amateurs in 1978. His son, Steve McCooke, was an Ormond Amateurs player, but is best known as a cricketer, with three Sheffield Shield appearances for Victoria.

== Sources ==
- Holmesby, R. & Main, J. (2014). The Encyclopedia of AFL Footballers: every AFL/VFL player since 1897 (10th ed.). Melbourne, Victoria: Bas Publishing. ISBN 978-1-921496-32-5
- Piesse, K. (2010) The Bears Uncensored, Cricketbooks.com.au: Melbourne. ISBN 9780646528793
