= Robert Fox (footballer) =

Australian rules footballer (1931–2026)

Personal information
- Full name: Robert Fox
- Born: 2 November 1931
- Died: July 2026 (aged 94)
- Original teams: Yark, Thornton
- Height: 189 cm (6 ft 2 in)
- Weight: 79 kg (174 lb)

Playing career^{1}
Years	Club	Games (Goals)
1955–1957	Essendon	52 (34)
- ^{1} Playing statistics correct to the end of 1957.

Robert Fox (2 November 1931 – July 2026) was an Australian rules footballer who played with Essendon in the Victorian Football League (VFL).

Fox won Yark Football Club's best and fairest in 1951. and won the Hume Highway Football League's best and fairest award in 1952.

He hailed from Yarck but was recruited to Essendon via Thornton. He kicked 24 goals from 19 games for Essendon in the 1955 VFL season, three of which came in the semi-final against Geelong.

His last game for Essendon was the 1957 VFL Grand Final, which he played as a centre half-forward, in a losing team.

Fox then decided to return to the country and played at Alexandra in 1958. At the end of the year he retired, but later made some appearances for the Katunga Football Club.

Fox died in July 2026, at the age of 94.
