= Fred Webster (Australian footballer) =

Australian rules footballer

Personal information
- Full name: Frederick Charles Webster
- Born: 19 April 1935
- Died: 17 December 2012 (aged 77)
- Height: 183 cm (6 ft 0 in)
- Weight: 84 kg (185 lb)

Playing career^{1}
Years	Club	Games (Goals)
1955	Melbourne	3 (2)
1956–63	Sandringham	153
- ^{1} Playing statistics correct to the end of 1963.

Frederick Charles Webster (19 April 1935 – 17 December 2012) was an Australian rules footballer who played for Melbourne in the Victorian Football League (VFL).

Webster made three appearances in the 1955 VFL season, after making his debut in a win over Geelong on the Melbourne Cricket Ground. His two other games were against Footscray.

The following season, Webster joined Sandringham in the Victorian Football Association, with whom he played until 1963. He was club captain from 1959, won the club's best and fairest award in 1961, and led Sandringham to their 1962 premiership. They came from 44 points down in the Grand Final to win by a point.
