= Millfield Theatre =

Theatre in Enfield, London, England

- Millfield Arts Centre
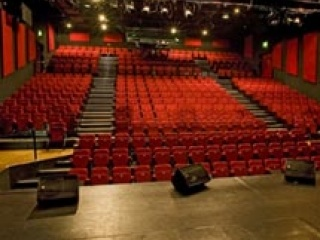
- Millfield Theatre
- Interactive map of Millfield Theatre
- Location: Edmonton; London, N18; United Kingdom
- Coordinates: 51.6165°N 0.0787°W
- Owner: London Borough of Enfield
- Capacity: 362
- Public transit: Silver Street

Construction
- Opened: 1988; 38 years ago
- Rebuilt: 2009

Website
- https://millfieldtheatre.co.uk/

Millfield Theatre forms part of Millfield Arts Centre, which encompasses Millfield Theatre and Millfield House in Edmonton, and The Dugdale Centre in Enfield Town. The theatre is owned, managed and funded entirely by the London Borough of Enfield. It has 17 full-time staff working on site at the theatre, and employs many more casual staff. Ushers at the theatre are all volunteers. The 18th century Millfield House houses the theatre's administration and contains rooms, which are available for hire, and also plays host to a number of educational classes and workshops for children and adults.

== History of Millfield Theatre ==
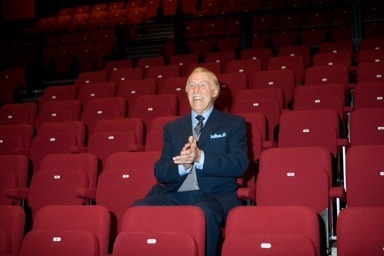
The opening of the Sir Bruce Forsyth Auditorium, 6 October 2009

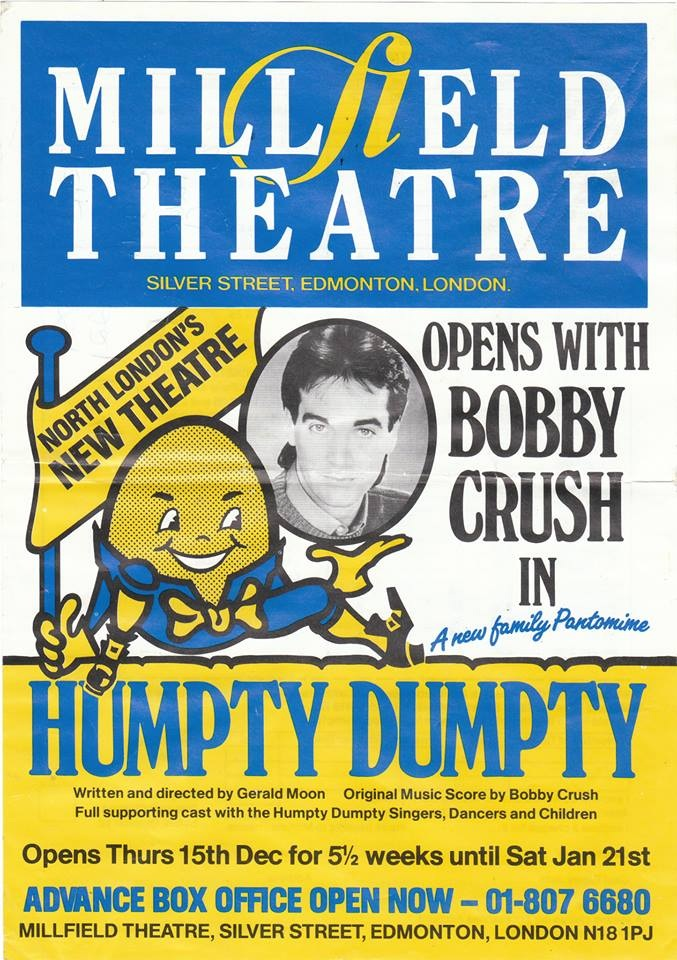
Millfield Theatre's first production, Humpty Dumpty

Millfield Theatre opened on 15 December 1988 in the grounds of Millfield House on Silver Street in Edmonton, North London. It was the first new theatre built in London after the National Theatre in 1976, and seats up to 362 in a variety of stage layouts.

The first production was the pantomime Humpty Dumpty starring Bobby Crush, and set the trend of producing an annual Christmas pantomime that continues today.

The Millfield Theatre was built largely thanks to Councillor Lionel Genn who was the Mayor of the London Borough of Enfield from 1972 to 1973. In recognition of this, the theatre auditorium was named the Lionel Genn auditorium in 1989. However, shortly afterwards, an Investigative news television programme implicated Genn in a financial scandal, and his name was removed from the theatre.

The theatre was re-opened on 6 October 2009 by the performer Bruce Forsyth, following significant refurbishment, gaining a new cafe bar, performance space, toilet block and box office. The main auditorium was renamed the Sir Bruce Forsyth Auditorium, as Forsyth was born in Edmonton.

== Programme ==
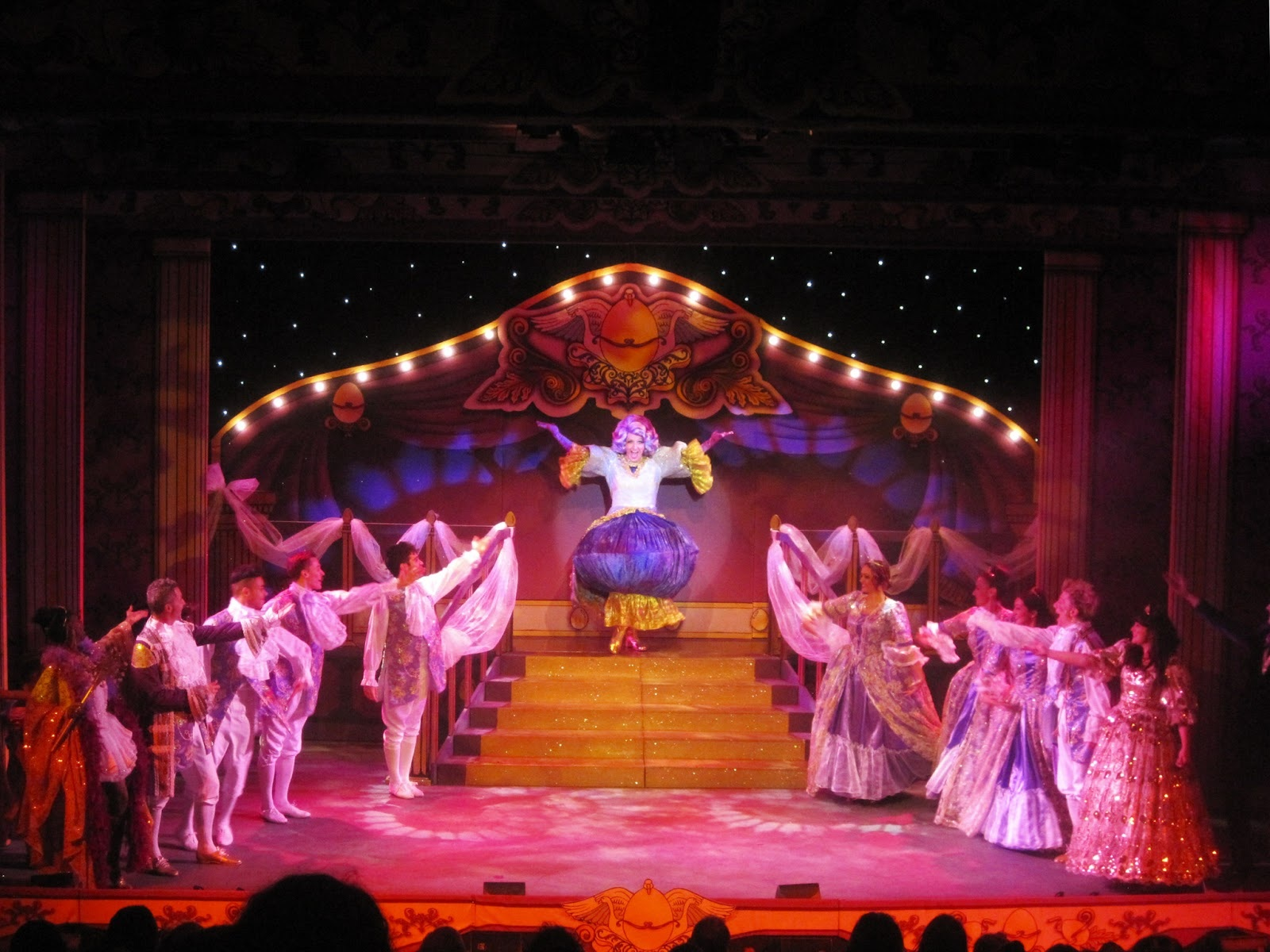
Millfield pantomime

Millfield Theatre plays host to comedy, musical, drama, dance, children's and music shows throughout the year. Most shows at the theatre are professional shows which the management bring in for a fee, or a split of the ticket sales. The venue also hosts productions by local Amateur Theatre Companies and local Dance Schools throughout the year. When hired, the venue offers the ability to sell tickets through its own box office.

== Transport ==
The theatre is located close to the Great Cambridge roundabout, where the North Circular and A10 meet. The nearest railway station is Silver Street, and the following London Bus routes serve the area:

- 34
- 102
- 144
- W6
- 217
- 231
