= Peter Marchesi =

Australian rules footballer

Personal information
- Full name: Peter Marchesi
- Born: 13 January 1933 (age 93)
- Original team: Kensington YCW
- Height: 179 cm (5 ft 10 in)
- Weight: 76 kg (168 lb)

Playing career^{1}
Years	Club	Games (Goals)
1955	North Melbourne	3 (0)
- ^{1} Playing statistics correct to the end of 1955.

Peter Marchesi (born 13 January 1933) is a former Australian rules footballer who played with North Melbourne in the Victorian Football League (VFL).

Marchesi's brother Gerald Marchesi also played for North Melbourne.
