= Donald Mennie =

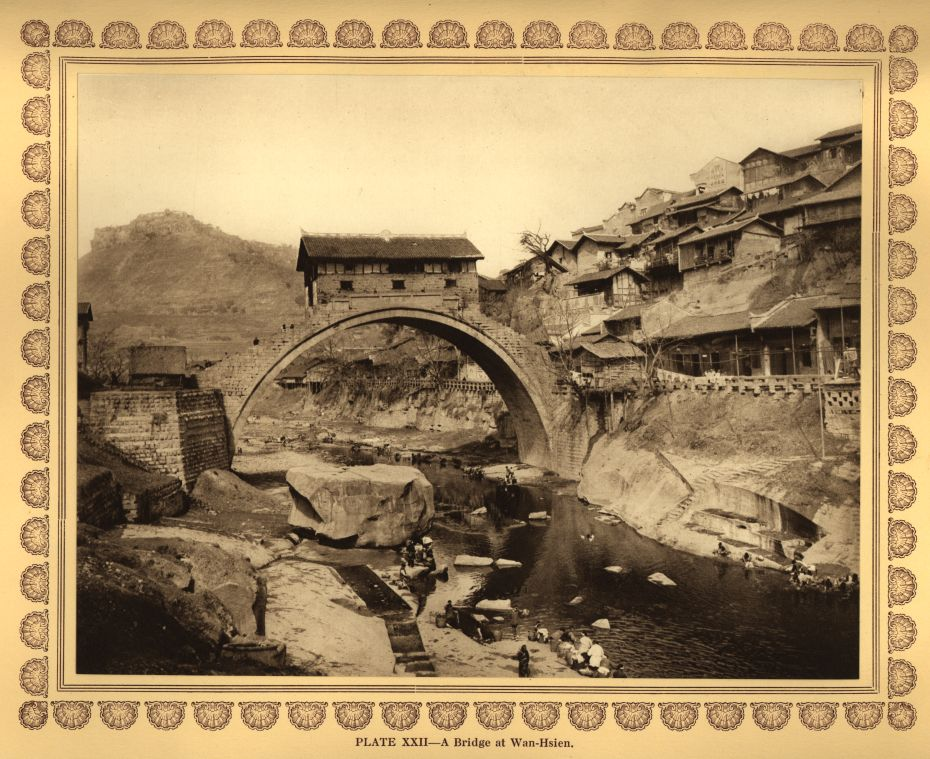
A Bridge at Wan-Hsien, Plate XXII from The Grandeur of the Gorges, published 1926

Donald Mennie (9 March 1875 – 10 January 1944) was a Scottish businessman and amateur photographer who worked in early twentieth century China.

Mennie was born in Golspie, Sutherland, Scotland in 1875, the son of Adam Mennie, a druggist, and his wife, Barbara Macleod. He had an elder brother James and a younger brother, Adam. His father died in 1889. His brother appears to have also been a chemist. Little is known of Mennie's early years or how he came to China, but having arrived there by 1899 he first worked as an assistant in the firm of Mactavish & Lehman & Co. in Peking (now Beijing) and then joined A.S. Watson & Co. in Shanghai, eventually becoming the firm's managing director.

In 1921 Mennie made a trip to England listing his contact as his subordinate the Director at Watson & Co Mr Chisolm, this suggesting he was unmarried. By 1934 Watson & Co was listed as 'Wholesale & Retail Chemists, Druggists, & wine, spirit, & cigar merchants; Dealer in all kinds of photographic chemicals & apparatus'. From 1920 until his death in 1941, Mennie was a very powerful entrepreneur in coastal China. Donald Mennie died in Shanghai in January 1944 aged 69/70. Lungwha camp historian Greg Leck reported that Mennie's name appears on a list of British internees in Shanghai, with a Lunghwa Camp number and "Lunghwa" next to his name.

Mennie’s first known work as a photographer were the illustrations in duotone to Elizabeth Cooper’s 'My Lady of the Chinese Courtyard', a story of women's lives in China published in New York in 1914 which went into a number of reprints. He evidently began extensive travels in these years and went on to publish his own photobooks beginning in 1920 with a soft cover and relatively modest album of 30 vandyke photogravures China by Land & Water published by A.S Watson and Co.

As a photographer, Mennie probably used the wet plate process, already a largely obsolete method in his time, and for his published prints, he mainly employed photogravure, a process emphasising the image softness and subtle tonal variation that suited his interest in pictorialism. Some of his published images were hand-coloured. His subjects evoked a romantic vision of "antique China", featuring dusty caravans, misty rural valleys, old palaces, and the Great Wall of China. Between 1914 and 1927 he published several books of his images, including The Pageant of Peking (1920), providing views of Beijing and its environs, printed folio size and bound in blue silk, Glimpses of China (1920 ?), China, North and South (1922), The Grandeur of the Gorges (1926), depicting scenes along the Yangtze River for which Mennie was proposed as a member of the Royal Geographical Society, and Pictures of Peking (after 1900).

He died in a Shanghai sanatorium in 1944.
