= Pat Trethowan =

Australian rules footballer

Personal information
- Full name: Pat Trethowan
- Born: 20 February 1941 (age 85)
- Original team: Rockbank
- Height: 188 cm (6 ft 2 in)
- Weight: 80 kg (176 lb)

Playing career^{1}
Years	Club	Games (Goals)
1962–64	South Melbourne	30 (3)
- ^{1} Playing statistics correct to the end of 1964.

Pat Trethowan (born 20 February 1941) is a former Australian rules footballer who played with South Melbourne in the Victorian Football League (VFL).
