= Off West End =

Theatres in London, England

Off West End refers to theatres in London which are not included as West End theatres. The term emerged relatively recently, having been coined after the similar American term "off-Broadway" (though without the same strict definition). The term is usually used synonymously with the more widespread term fringe (or, specifically, the London Fringe), but sometimes is also used to refer to more mainstream or commercial theatre which is located within London but outside the centre, or to especially small and non-commercial theatres located within the centre. According to London Theatre, "Smaller theatres, including many pub theatres, are called fringe, although some of these small theatres are also called off West End, particularly those located in the West End of London, where most of the big commercial theatres are. These small theatres can vary in size, with seating capacities of around 40 to 400."

While West End Theatres must register with the Society of London Theatre, SOLT membership for the off West End is optional and is not widespread. The industry organisations for off West End and fringe venues are OffWestEnd, the London Theatre Consortium (larger venues), and the Society of Independent Theatres (smaller venues).

As of 2026, as part of their 20th anniversary, OffWestEnd.com announced a new optional membership scheme to support dedicated Off West End theatres participating in the Offies allowing the awards body and website to continue supporting the sector. Theatres can become members of the Offies and receive 10% off marketing costs via their new website.

== Venues ==
- Almeida Theatre
- Arcola Theatre
- Arts Depot
- Battersea Arts Centre
- Bloomsbury Theatre
- Bridewell Theatre
- Brixton House
- Bush Theatre
- Charing Cross Theatre
- Courtyard Theatre, London
- Drayton Arms Theatre
- Donmar Warehouse
- Finborough Theatre
- Greenwich Theatre
- Hampstead Theatre
- Hoxton Hall
- Jacksons Lane
- Jermyn Street Theatre
- Kiln Theatre
- King's Head Theatre
- Leicester Square Theatre
- Stockwell Playhouse
- Lyric Hammersmith
- Menier Chocolate Factory
- Millfield Arts Centre
- Orange Tree Theatre
- Pleasance Theatre
- The Other Palace
- The Park Theatre
- The Print Room
- Rich Mix Cultural Foundation
- Riverside Studios
- Rose Theatre
- Royal Court
- Rudolf Steiner Theatre
- Shaw Theatre
- Soho Theatre
- Southwark Playhouse
- The Albany
- The Cockpit
- The Yard
- The Pen Theatre
- Theatre Royal Stratford East
- Toynbee Studios
- Turbine Theatre
- Union Theatre
- Upstairs at the Gatehouse
- Waterloo East Theatre
- The White Bear
- Young Vic

== The Offies ==
The Off West End Theatre Awards, known colloquially as The Offies, have been awarded to Off-West End theatre productions since 2011.
