= Gerry Burton =

Australian rules footballer

Personal information
- Full name: Gerald Adrian Burton
- Born: 11 February 1933 (age 93)
- Original team: East Perth
- Height: 180 cm (5 ft 11 in)
- Weight: 79 kg (174 lb)
- Position: Halfback

Playing career^{1}
Years	Club	Games (Goals)
1953-54	East Perth (WAFL)	23 (3)
1955	St Kilda	10 (0)
1959	East Perth (WAFL)	3 (0)
- ^{1} Playing statistics correct to the end of 1959.

Gerald Adrian Burton (born 11 February 1933) is a former Australian rules footballer who played with East Perth in the West Australian Football League (WAFL) and St Kilda in the Victorian Football League (VFL).

== Family ==
The son of Gerald Joseph Burton (1903–1967) and Flora Nowotny (1908–2010), Gerald Adrian Burton was born in Perth on 11 February 1933.

His mother was a well known singer and his parents divorced in 1941 after she had an affair. Burton is also the uncle of Swan Districts legend Stan Nowotny.

In 1954, while in Victoria, Burton married Shirley Florence Weinman.

== Football ==
Gerry Burton played senior level Australian rules football during the 1950s, an era defined by fierce state rivalries and physical, uncompromising play. Standing at 180 cm (5'11") and weighing 79 kg, Burton was well suited for the fast-paced but physical game of that era. He was utilised primarily as a half-back and utility player.

=== East Perth ===
Born and raised in Western Australia, Burton commenced his career at East Perth in the West Australian Football League (WAFL). He was a key player in 1953, finishing runner up to Merv McIntosh in the Sandover Medal that year. He left Perth early in the 1954 season when he was transferred to N.S.W., having originally hoped to move to Melbourne. This was at the start of a legendary era for East Perth—just as the club was building toward its dominant 1956 premiership.

=== St Kilda ===
Like many top-tier W.A. players of the era, his talent caught the attention of Victorian scouts. In 1955 Burton secured a transfer in the R.A.A.F. to Point Cook and he played 10 games for St Kilda that year.

=== East Perth ===
By 1959 Burton was back in Western Australia and he resumed with East Perth, playing a further 3 games for them at the end of his senior football career.

== Military ==
Burton's service in the Royal Australian Air Force continued during the Vietnam War. He was deployed to South Vietnam, serving with the highly respected No. 9 Squadron RAAF. As an electrical fitter, Burton worked on the iconic UH-1 Iroquois ("Huey") helicopters, which were the lifelines of the Australian forces and used to perform troop insertions, medical evacuations (Medevacs), and resupply missions.

Burton’s military service is uniquely preserved in a Christmas newsreel broadcast showing him sending holiday wishes from the war zone back to his loved ones in Dianella, Perth.
