= Woodmansey =

Village and civil parish in the East Riding of Yorkshire, England

Coordinates: 53.826710°N 0.398419°W

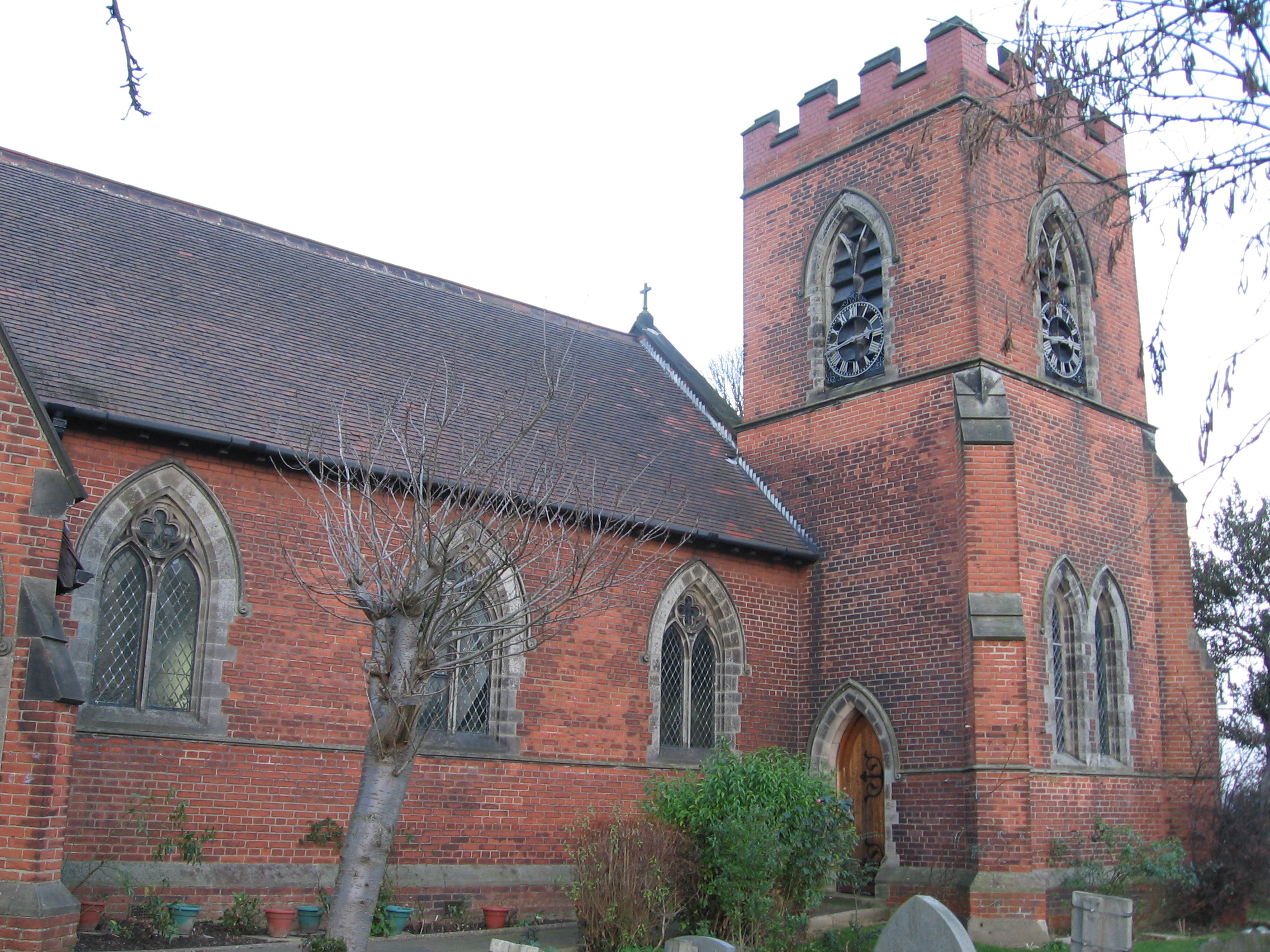
- St Peter's Church, Woodmansey

- Location within the East Riding of Yorkshire
- Population: 7,109 (2011 census)
- OS grid reference: TA055379
- Civil parish: Woodmansey
- Unitary authority: East Riding of Yorkshire
- Ceremonial county: East Riding of Yorkshire
- Region: Yorkshire and the Humber
- Country: England
- Sovereign state: United Kingdom
- Post town: BEVERLEY
- Postcode district: HU17
- Dialling code: 01482
- Police: Humberside
- Fire: Humberside
- Ambulance: Yorkshire
- UK Parliament: Beverley and Holderness

Woodmansey is a village and civil parish in the East Riding of Yorkshire, England. It is situated approximately 1.5 miles (2.4 km) south-east of Beverley on the A1174 road from Hull to Beverley.

The name Woodmansey derives from either the Old English wudumannsǣ meaning 'woodsman's lake', or wudumannsēa meaning 'woodsman's river'.

== Geography ==
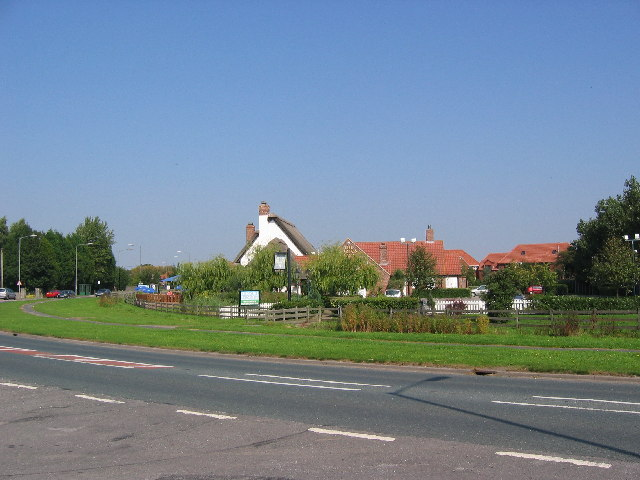
The Warton Arms in Woodmansey seen from the A1174

The civil parish of Woodmansey consists of the villages of Woodmansey and Dunswell and the hamlet of Thearne. According to the 2011 United Kingdom census, Woodmansey parish had a population of 7,109, an increase on the 2001 UK census figure of 6,497.

The village has a small primary school, Woodmansey Church of England Voluntary Controlled Primary School, which was opened in 1856 and celebrated its 150th anniversary in 2006.

Opposite the school is the village church of St Peter's which was built to a design by Alfred Beaumont and opened in 1898.

The Warton Arms (pictured) with its thatched roof, is the only pub in the village.

== Governance ==
The civil parish is in the Beverley and Holderness parliamentary constituency.

== See also ==
- Listed buildings in Woodmansey
