= Millfield House =

Building in Edmonton, London, England

Coordinates: 51.6165°N 0.0787°W

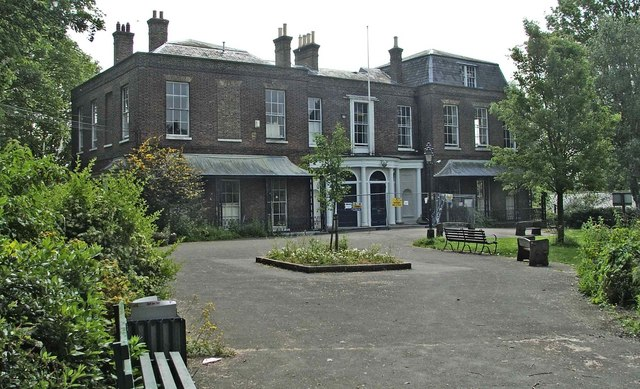
Millfield House

Millfield House is a Grade II* listed building located in Silver Street, Edmonton, London. Previously a private house, it has been used as an arts centre since 1979.

== History ==
The house is first mentioned in 1796 when it belonged to John Wigston of Trent Park. Later that year it was let to the Ambassador of Austria. The house was valued at £6,300 by 1828, when Robert Mushet of the Royal Mint died there. The house was sold in 1849 to the Strand Union Guardians for a school for London workhouse children, and over the next 40 years several extensions were made to the house which by 1897 housed 400 children. The school was partly self- sufficient complete with two meadows, cultivated land and a herd of cows and some pigs. The children were taught trades; the boys, tailoring, shoe making and carpentry; the girls, housework, needlework and laundering.

In 1913 the school closed and by the beginning of World War I housed Belgian refugees. The house was converted into the St Davids Hospital for epileptics in 1915 by the Metropolitan Asylums Board.

By 1971 the house was acquired by the London Borough of Enfield, who renovated and demolished some of the work house buildings, although a lodge and outbuildings from that period remain as well as an early 20th-century lodge. The house was re-opened as an arts Centre in 1979 and includes the Millfield Theatre. Weir Hall Library was on site until December 2008 but has since been relocated to Fore Street, Edmonton. The space has now been redeveloped as a cafe bar and performance space.

In the gardens one of the few remaining communal air-raid shelters in Enfield can be found (which can be visited). The gardens are open to the public and can be reached by following the Pymmes Brook Trail (the brook flows through the garden) from Pymmes Park.

Adjacent to the garden is the St David's play area. There is also a small library.

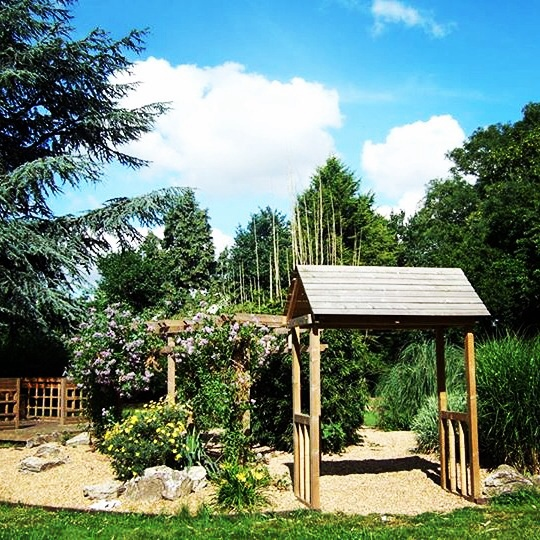
Millfield House Gardens

== Programme ==
The arts centre plays host to comedy, musical, drama, dance, children's and music shows throughout the year. Most shows at the theatre are professional shows which the management bring in for a fee, or a split of the ticket sales. When hired, the venue offers the ability to sell tickets through its own box office, subject to a commission.

At Millfield House several classes take place for adults, children and young people. Including pilates, chess, youth theatre, drama, manga, dance and art Club. The house underwent extensive refurbishment in 2010/11.

In addition the theatre stages an annual traditional pantomime.
