= Jack Suttie =

Australian rules footballer

Personal information
- Full name: Jack Suttie
- Born: 2 October 1934 (age 92)
- Original team: Black Rock
- Height: 193 cm (6 ft 4 in)
- Weight: 94 kg (207 lb)

Playing career^{1}
Years	Club	Games (Goals)
1955	St Kilda	1 (1)
- ^{1} Playing statistics correct to the end of 1955.

Jack Suttie (born 2 October 1934) is a former Australian rules footballer who played with St Kilda in the Victorian Football League (VFL).
