= Kevin Smith (sailor) =

Canadian sailor

Personal information
- Born: 12 May 1957 (age 69) Rexdale, Ontario, Canada

Sport
- Sport: Sailing

Kevin Smith (born 12 May 1957) is a Canadian sailor. He competed at the 1988 Summer Olympics and the 1992 Summer Olympics.
