= Kevin Smith (Australian actor) =

Australian actor

Kevin Smith (1953–2005) was an actor who worked for with the Belvoir Theatre Company in Sydney playing roles in Shakespeare and modern works. He was also known as the narrator of Dreamtime animations and the storyteller of Dreamtime stories on Australian TV. He narrated the stage version of Tim Winton's Cloudstreet that toured Australia.

Smith was the eldest of seven children born to Keith and Patricia Smith. His mother was Murramarang; his father Walbunga. At the end of the 1960s, Smith moved to Sydney, where he trained as a boxer and got an apprenticeship as a mould maker. After attending a theatre workshop, Smith found his niche and his acting career began. He played many support roles on TV and in film. His last performance on film was in the Ray Lawrence film Jindabyne, in which he played the bereaved father of the dead girl.

Smith was an elder of the Walbunga clan, and a founding member of the Walbunga Native Title land claim. He had eight children, and eight grandchildren.
