= Geoff Umbers =

Australian rules footballer

Personal information
- Full name: Geoff Umbers
- Born: 31 October 1933
- Died: 16 August 2014 (aged 80)
- Original team: Warrnambool
- Height: 180 cm (5 ft 11 in)
- Weight: 83 kg (183 lb)

Playing career^{1}
Years	Club	Games (Goals)
1955–56	Geelong	7 (2)
- ^{1} Playing statistics correct to the end of 1956.

Geoff Umbers (31 October 1933 – 16 August 2014) was an Australian rules footballer who played with Geelong in the Victorian Football League (VFL).
