= John Haygarth (footballer) =

Australian rules footballer

Personal information
- Full name: John Haygarth
- Born: 13 July 1934
- Original team: Inverleigh
- Height: 177 cm (5 ft 10 in)
- Weight: 73 kg (161 lb)
- Position: Halfback

Playing career^{1}
| Years | Club | Games (Goals) |
| 1955–59 | Geelong | 59 (13) |
- ^{1} Playing statistics correct to the end of 1959.

John Haygarth (born 13 July 1934) is a former Australian rules footballer who played with Geelong in the Victorian Football League (VFL).
