= Kevin Bergin =

Australian rules footballer

Personal information
- Full name: Kevin Bergin
- Born: 15 September 1936 (age 90)
- Original team: Carlton District / Old Paradians
- Height: 175 cm (5 ft 9 in)
- Weight: 74 kg (163 lb)

Playing career^{1}
| Years | Club | Games (Goals) |
| 1955–56 | Carlton | 12 (12) |
| 1957 | Collingwood | 5 (4) |
| Total | | 17 (16) |
- ^{1} Playing statistics correct to the end of 1957.

Kevin Bergin (born 15 September 1936) is a former Australian rules footballer who played with Carlton and Collingwood in the Victorian Football League (VFL).
