= Frank Primmer =

Australian rules footballer

Personal information
- Full name: Francis William Primmer
- Born: 16 January 1933
- Died: 23 October 2005 (aged 72)
- Original team: South Warrnambool
- Height: 184 cm (6 ft 0 in)
- Weight: 73 kg (161 lb)

Playing career^{1}
Years	Club	Games (Goals)
1955–57	South Melbourne	25 (7)
- ^{1} Playing statistics correct to the end of 1957.

Francis William Primmer (16 January 1933 – 23 October 2005) was an Australian rules footballer who played with South Melbourne in the Victorian Football League (VFL).
