= Frank McDowell =

Australian rules footballer

Personal information
- Full name: Frank William McDowell
- Born: 19 March 1934
- Died: 2 October 2003 (aged 69)
- Original team: Yarraville
- Height: 187 cm (6 ft 2 in)
- Weight: 86 kg (190 lb)

Playing career^{1}
Years	Club	Games (Goals)
1955	Footscray	1 (0)
- ^{1} Playing statistics correct to the end of 1955.

Frank William McDowell (19 March 1934 – 2 October 2003) was an Australian rules footballer who played with Footscray in the Victorian Football League (VFL).
