= Warren Prest =

Australian rules footballer and coach (1932–2008)

Personal information
- Full name: Warren James Prest
- Born: 9 December 1932
- Died: 6 February 2008 (aged 75)
- Original team: Aberfeldie
- Height: 187 cm (6 ft 2 in)
- Weight: 85 kg (187 lb)
- Position: Follower

Playing career^{1}
Years	Club	Games (Goals)
1955–56	Essendon	3 (0)
- ^{1} Playing statistics correct to the end of 1956.

Warren James Prest (9 December 1932 – 6 February 2008) was an Australian rules footballer who played with Essendon in the Victorian Football League (VFL). He later played with Preston in the Victorian Football Association (VFA), Epping, and was captain-coach of Mernda.
