= Don Carmichael =

Australian rules footballer (1937–2020)

Personal information
- Full name: Donald Cameron Carmichael
- Born: 3 March 1937; Yarrawonga, Victoria
- Died: 8 October 2020; Sale, Victoria
- Original team: Lincoln Stars
- Height: 180 cm (5 ft 11 in)
- Weight: 78 kg (172 lb)
- Position: Half-back

Playing career^{1}
Years	Club	Games (Goals)
1955–57	Essendon	15 (1)
- ^{1} Playing statistics correct to the end of 1957.

Donald Cameron Carmichael (3 March 1937 – 8 October 2020) was an Australian rules footballer who played with Essendon in the Victorian Football League (VFL).

Carmichael won Essendon's reserves best and fairest in 1955 and he later played with St Kilda's reserves, Redan, Williamstown and Sale. Carmichael played 90 games for Williamstown from 1960-65, kicking 31 goals and played in the 1961 and 1964 VFA grand finals. He finished in third place in the Club's 1962 best and fairest award and was awarded the most serviceable player trophy in 1961.

He moved to Sale in 1966 and spent the remainder of his life there, working as a schoolteacher.
