= Noel Rayson =

Australian rules footballer

Personal information
- Full name: Noel Douglas Rayson
- Born: 24 May 1933; Geelong, Victoria
- Died: 11 February 2003 (aged 69)
- Original team: Newtown & Chilwell
- Height: 179 cm (5 ft 10 in)
- Weight: 72.5 kg (160 lb)

Playing career^{1}
Years	Club	Games (Goals)
1950–1958	Geelong	95 (210)
1958–1959	South Melbourne	12 (18)
Total		107 (228)
- ^{1} Playing statistics correct to the end of 1959.

Career highlights
- VFL Leading Goal-kicker 1955 (77 goals); Geelong Leading Goal-kicker 1955, 1956

Noel Douglas Rayson (24 May 1933 – 11 February 2003) was an Australian rules footballer who played with Geelong and South Melbourne during his ten-year career in the Victorian Football League (VFL).

Rayson joined Geelong at the age of 16, and was just past his 17th birthday when he played his first senior game. He played few games during his first few seasons, as Geelong had won successive flags. He also twice represented Victoria.

He won the VFL Leading Goal-kicker award in 1955 with 77 goals.
