= Colin Vance =

Australian rules footballer

Personal information
- Full name: Colin Vance
- Born: 10 October 1929
- Died: 16 August 2018 (aged 88)
- Original team: Albert Park Surfers
- Height: 191 cm (6 ft 3 in)
- Weight: 78 kg (172 lb)

Playing career^{1}
Years	Club	Games (Goals)
1955	South Melbourne	3 (5)
- ^{1} Playing statistics correct to the end of 1955.

Colin Vance (10 October 1929 – 16 August 2018) was an Australian rules footballer who played with South Melbourne in the Victorian Football League (VFL).

A full forward, Vance surprised onlookers in his debut in Round 1, 1955 when he attempted his first set shot with a place kick, which had long disappeared from the game; the kick was well wide of the goals. He occasionally used place kicks throughout his junior and senior career. He played only three senior games for South Melbourne, and later played for Sandringham in the Victorian Football Association.
