= Glenn Dugdale =

Australian rules footballer

Personal information
- Full name: Glenn Dugdale
- Born: 2 June 1961 (age 65)
- Original team: Doncaster Heights
- Height: 193 cm (6 ft 4 in)
- Weight: 94 kg (207 lb)

Playing career^{1}
Years	Club	Games (Goals)
1981–1984	North Melbourne	23 (6)
- ^{1} Playing statistics correct to the end of 1984.

Glenn Dugdale (born 2 June 1961) is a former Australian rules footballer who played with North Melbourne in the Victorian Football League (VFL).

A ruckman, Dugdale came to North Melbourne from Doncaster Heights, along with his brother Dean Dugdale. Their father, club secretary John Dugdale, was a former North Melbourne captain and seven-time leading goalkicker.

Dugdale made 23 appearances for North Melbourne, from 1981 to 1984. Two of his teammates in 1981, David Dench and Ken Montgomery, had also played in the same side as his father.

He later played in the Victorian Football Association for Brunswick.
