= John Trethowan =

Australian rules footballer (1936–2020)

Personal information
- Full name: John Trethowan
- Born: 28 October 1936; Rockbank, Victoria
- Died: 1 April 2020 (aged 83)
- Original team: Rockbank
- Height: 188 cm (6 ft 2 in)
- Weight: 92 kg (203 lb)
- Position: Ruck

Playing career^{1}
Years	Club	Games (Goals)
1955–62	South Melbourne	81 (13)
- ^{1} Playing statistics correct to the end of 1962.

John Trethowan (28 October 1936 – 1 April 2020) was an Australian rules footballer who played with South Melbourne in the Victorian Football League (VFL).
