= The Dugdale Centre =

Arts centre in Enfield, Greater London, England

Coordinates: 51.6503°N 0.0811°W

Dugdale Arts Centre
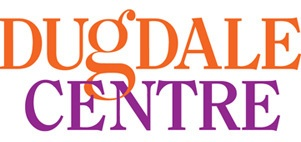
- Interactive map of Dugdale Arts Centre
- Location: Enfield Town, London; United Kingdom
- Owner: London Borough of Enfield
- Capacity: 139
- Public transit: Enfield Town; Enfield Chase

Construction
- Opened: 2011; 15 years ago

Website
- https://www.dugdaleartscentre.co.uk

Dugdale Arts Centre (DAC) is situated in the centre of Enfield Town. It contains a 150-seat studio theatre, the Museum of Enfield, workshops and small-scale performance spaces and an award-winning cafe restaurant specialising in locally made and sustainable food.

The venue is open Tuesday to Sunday during school term and Monday to Sunday during school holidays, with exhibitions, workshops and community gatherings.

DAC is owned, managed and funded by London Borough of Enfield Council.

== History ==
Between 2008 and 2011, the Dugdale Centre was the temporary home of the Enfield Town Library and then the Forty Hall and the estate administration while they both underwent major refurbishment.

The Dugdale Centre became part of the Millfield Arts Centre family in October 2011. The theatre programme was developed to create a new style of studio work not previously available in Enfield. New programmes of jazz, comedy, mime, poetry, puppetry and children's theatre were developed to complement the larger scale work produced at Millfield Theatre.

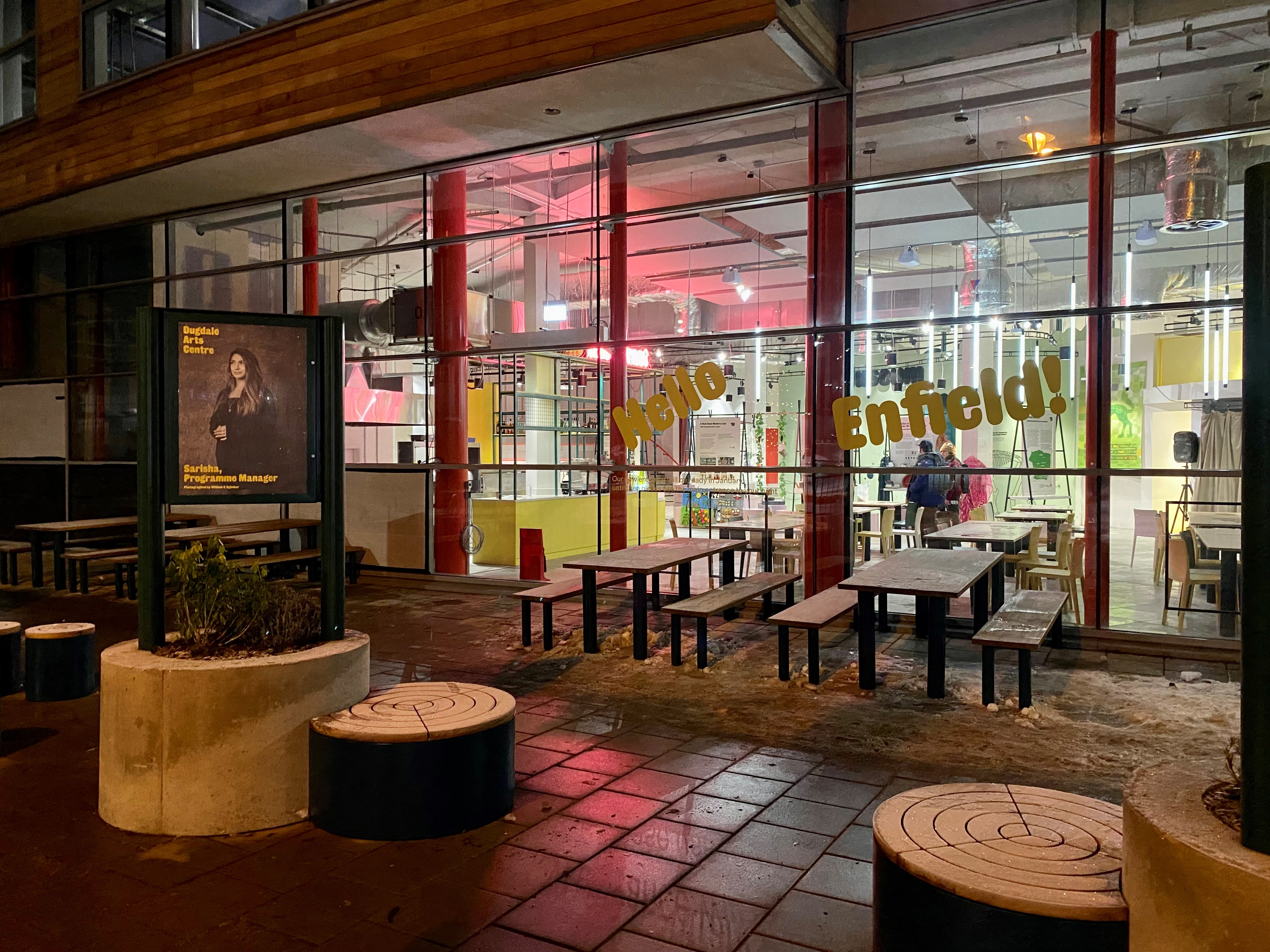
Dugdale Arts Centre exterior

In the summer of 2012, the first floor was developed into a suite of conference and meeting rooms, which opened to the public in November 2012. A new home was also developed for the permanent collection of the Museum of Enfield, to sit alongside the local studies and archives.

In January 2013, new wing space and side seating were developed in the Studio Theatre, creating larger capacities and more flexible use of the venue.

In 2020, the site was used by the NHS as one of the chief COVID-19 vaccination centres for the borough.

An extensive renovation was carried out and the site reopened in December 2022 as Dugdale Arts Centre, with a new design by architects Dallas-Pierce-Quintero.

== Transport ==
DAC is located close in the centre of Enfield Town at the Junction of London Road and Cecil Road. The nearest railway stations are Enfield Town and Enfield Chase. The following London Bus routes serve the area:

- 121
- W8
- 329
- 231
