= Kevin J. Smith =

Australian rules footballer (1934–2018)

Kevin Smith

Personal information
- Full name: Kevin John Smith
- Born: 30 November 1934; Yarraville
- Died: 22 June 2018 (aged 83); Bendigo
- Original team: Eaglehawk
- Height: 169 cm (5 ft 7 in)
- Weight: 71 kg (157 lb)

Playing career^{1}
Years	Club	Games (Goals)
1955–56	Footscray	17 (7)
- ^{1} Playing statistics correct to the end of 1956.

Kevin Smith (30 November 1934 – 22 June 2018) was an Australian rules footballer who played with Footscray in the Victorian Football League (VFL).

In 1955, Kevin R. Smith was transferred to Footscray from North Melbourne, and the two men with the same name played together in two games.
