= Ron Dixon (Australian footballer) =

Australian rules footballer

Personal information
- Full name: Ron Dixon
- Born: 24 November 1933
- Height: 168 cm (5 ft 6 in)
- Weight: 76 kg (168 lb)

Playing career^{1}
Years	Club	Games (Goals)
1955–56	Footscray	10 (0)
- ^{1} Playing statistics correct to the end of 1956.

Ron Dixon (born 24 November 1933) is a former Australian rules footballer who played with Footscray in the Victorian Football League (VFL).
