= Beverley and Holderness =

UK Parliament constituency (since 1997)

Coordinates: 53.800°N 0.156°W

- County constituency for the House of Commons
- Boundaries since 2024
- Boundary of Beverley and Holderness in Yorkshire and the Humber
- County: East Riding of Yorkshire
- Population: 99,748 (2011 census)
- Electorate: 78,645 (December 2019)
- Major settlements: Beverley; Hedon; Withernsea

Current constituency
- Created: 1997
- Member of Parliament: Graham Stuart (Conservative)
- Seats: One
- Created from: Beverley; Boothferry; Bridlington (parts of)

Beverley and Holderness is a county constituency in the East Riding of Yorkshire for the House of Commons of the Parliament of the United Kingdom. It elects one Member of Parliament (MP) at least once every five years by the first-past-the-post electoral system. The constituency has been represented by Graham Stuart of the Conservative Party since the 2005 general election.

== Constituency profile ==
The Beverley and Holderness constituency covers the south-eastern portion of the East Riding of Yorkshire. It contains the coastal region of Holderness and the rural areas to the north of Kingston upon Hull. Settlements in the constituency include the market town of Beverley, the smaller towns of Hedon and Withernsea and many smaller villages.

The constituency is predominantly rural and agricultural. Beverley is a local centre for commerce and, historically, shipbuilding. The coastal area is popular with tourists and contains a number of holiday parks. Residents are generally older and have similar levels of wealth when compared to national averages. White people make up 98% of the population. At the most recent county council election in 2023, voters in Beverley and the western areas of the constituency elected Liberal Democrat councillors, whilst the eastern coastal part elected Conservatives. It is estimated that 58% of voters supported leaving the European Union in the 2016 referendum, a higher proportion than the country as a whole.

== History ==
The seat has been won by the Conservative candidate at every general election since its creation in 1997, on a majority ranging between 38.2% in the 2019 general election to 0.3% in the 2024 general election. The party of the runner-up candidate has been Labour seven times and Liberal Democrat once.

== Boundaries ==
1997–2010: The East Yorkshire Borough of Beverley wards of Cherry Holme, Leconfield, Leven, Minster North, Minster South, Molescroft, St Mary's East, St Mary's West, Tickton, Walkington, and Woodmansey, and the Borough of Holderness.

2010–2024: The District of East Riding of Yorkshire wards of Beverley Rural, Mid Holderness, Minster and Woodmansey, North Holderness, St Mary's, South East Holderness, and South West Holderness.

From and including the 2010 general election the composition of the seat changed: the civil parishes Brandesburton and Woodmansey were transferred to other seats (East Yorkshire and Haltemprice and Howden respectively); and Middleton on the Wolds and Newbald were gained from the same respective seats.

2024–present: The District of East Riding of Yorkshire wards of: Beverley Rural, Mid Holderness, Minster and Woodmansey, St Mary’s, South East Holderness, and South West Holderness.

The North Holderness ward was transferred to the new constituency of Bridlington and the Wolds.

== Members of Parliament ==
Beverley and Boothferry prior to 1997

Election	Member	Party
1997	James Cran	Conservative
2005	Graham Stuart	Conservative

== Elections ==
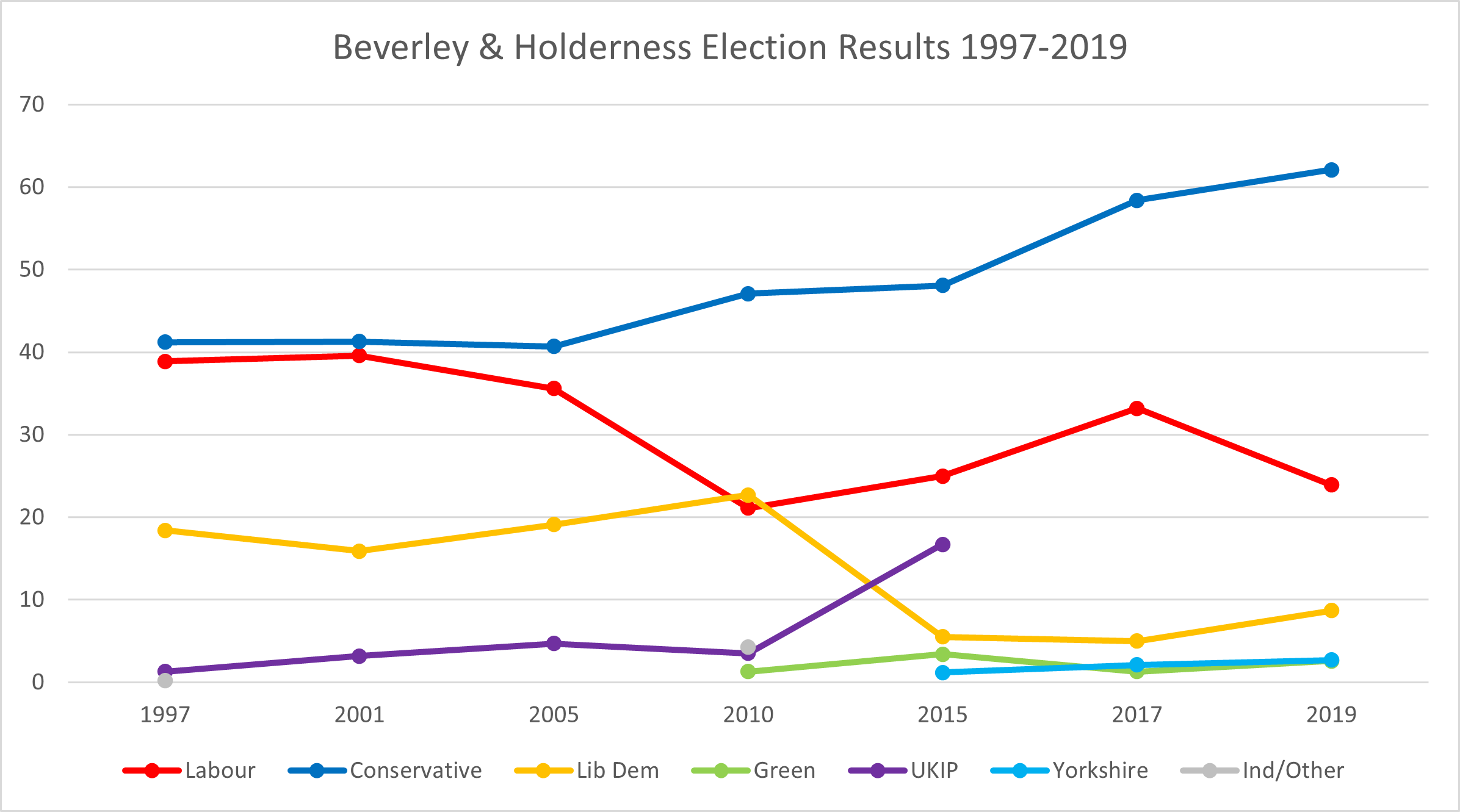
Election results, 1997 to 2019

=== Elections in the 2020s ===
2024 general election: Beverley and Holderness (Note: The changes in percentage values since the 2019 election are based on notional results due to boundary changes.)
Party	Candidate	Votes	%	±%
Conservative	Graham Stuart	15,501	34.5	−26.5
Labour	Margaret Pinder	15,377	34.2	+9.5
Reform UK	Andrew Smith	8,198	18.3	N/A
Liberal Democrats	Denis Healy	3,386	7.5	−1.8
Green	Jonathan Stephenson	1,647	3.7	+1.2
Yorkshire	George McManus	625	1.4	−1.2
SDP	Chris Collin	89	0.2	N/A
Alliance for Democracy and Freedom	John Ottaway	74	0.2	N/A
Majority		124	0.3	−36.0
Turnout		44,897	62.4	−4.8
Registered electors		71,994		
Conservative hold		Swing	−18.0	

=== Elections in the 2010s ===
2019 general election: Beverley and Holderness
Party	Candidate	Votes	%	±%
Conservative	Graham Stuart	33,250	62.1	+3.7
Labour	Chloe Hopkins	12,802	23.9	−9.3
Liberal Democrats	Denis Healy	4,671	8.7	+3.7
Yorkshire	Andy Shead	1,441	2.7	+0.6
Green	Isabel Pires	1,378	2.6	+1.3
Majority		20,448	38.2	+13.0
Turnout		53,542	67.2	−1.8
Registered electors		79,696		
Conservative hold		Swing	+6.5	

2017 general election: Beverley and Holderness
Party	Candidate	Votes	%	±%
Conservative	Graham Stuart	32,499	58.4	+10.3
Labour	Johanna Boal	18,457	33.2	+8.2
Liberal Democrats	Denis Healy	2,808	5.0	−0.5
Yorkshire	Lee Walton	1,158	2.1	+0.9
Green	Richard Howarth	716	1.3	−2.1
Majority		14,042	25.2	+2.1
Turnout		55,638	69.0	+3.8
Registered electors		80,657		
Conservative hold		Swing	+1.1	

2015 general election: Beverley and Holderness
Party	Candidate	Votes	%	±%
Conservative	Graham Stuart	25,363	48.1	+1.0
Labour	Margaret Pinder	13,160	25.0	+3.9
UKIP	Gary Shores	8,794	16.7	+13.2
Liberal Democrats	Denis Healy	2,900	5.5	−17.2
Green	Richard Howarth	1,802	3.4	+2.1
Yorkshire First	Lee Walton	658	1.2	N/A
Majority		12,203	23.1	−1.3
Turnout		52,677	65.2	−1.9
Registered electors		80,805		
Conservative hold		Swing	−1.5	

2010 general election: Beverley and Holderness (Note: The changes in percentage values since the 2005 election are based on notional results due to boundary changes.)
Party	Candidate	Votes	%	±%
Conservative	Graham Stuart	25,063	47.1	+6.2
Liberal Democrats	Craig Dobson	12,076	22.7	+3.0
Labour	Ian Saunders	11,224	21.1	−13.6
BNP	Neil Whitelam	2,080	3.9	N/A
UKIP	Andy Horsfield	1,845	3.5	−1.2
Green	Bill Rigby	686	1.3	N/A
Independent	Ron Hughes	225	0.4	N/A
Majority		12,987	24.4	+18.2
Turnout		53,199	67.1	+2.9
Registered electors		79,318		
Conservative hold		Swing	+1.6	

=== Elections in the 2000s ===
2005 general election: Beverley and Holderness
Party	Candidate	Votes	%	±%
Conservative	Graham Stuart	20,435	40.7	−0.6
Labour	George McManus	17,854	35.6	−4.0
Liberal Democrats	Stewart Willie	9,578	19.1	+3.2
UKIP	Oliver Marriott	2,336	4.7	+1.5
Majority		2,581	5.1	+3.4
Turnout		50,203	65.3	+3.3
Registered electors		76,868		
Conservative hold		Swing	+2.3	

2001 general election: Beverley and Holderness
Party	Candidate	Votes	%	±%
Conservative	James Cran	19,168	41.3	+0.1
Labour	Pippa Langford	18,387	39.6	+0.7
Liberal Democrats	Stewart Willie	7,356	15.9	−2.5
UKIP	Stephen Wallis	1,464	3.2	+1.9
Majority		781	1.7	−0.6
Turnout		46,375	62.0	−10.9
Registered electors		74,741		
Conservative hold		Swing	−0.3	

=== Elections in the 1990s ===
1997 general election: Beverley and Holderness
Party	Candidate	Votes	%	±%
Conservative	James Cran	21,629	41.2	
Labour	Norman O'Neill	20,418	38.9	
Liberal Democrats	John Melling	9,689	18.4	
UKIP	David Barley	695	1.3	
Natural Law	Stewart Withers	111	0.2	
Majority		1,211	2.3	
Turnout		52,542	72.9	
Registered electors		72,049		
Conservative win (new seat)				

== See also ==
- List of parliamentary constituencies in Humberside
- List of parliamentary constituencies in the Yorkshire and the Humber (region)
