= Kevin R. Smith =

Australian rules footballer

Kevin Smith

Personal information
- Full name: Kevin Smith
- Born: 10 August 1932
- Died: 18 September 1991 (aged 59)
- Original team: Happy Valley Rovers
- Height: 169 cm (5 ft 7 in)
- Weight: 71 kg (157 lb)
- Position: Rover

Playing career^{1}
Years	Club	Games (Goals)
1950–55	North Melbourne	40 (48)
1955–56	Footscray	7 (13)
Total		47 (61)
- ^{1} Playing statistics correct to the end of 1956.

Kevin Smith (10 August 1932 – 18 September 1991) was a former Australian rules footballer who played with North Melbourne and Footscray in the Victorian Football League (VFL).

In 1955 he was transferred to Footscray, where he played alongside Kevin J. Smith.
