= Gerald Marchesi =

Personal information
- Born: 4 December 1928
- Died: 12 June 1990 (aged 61)
- Original team: Kensington YCW
- Height: 178 cm (5 ft 10 in)
- Weight: 81 kg (179 lb)

Playing career
Years	Club	Games (Goals)
1947–1954	North Melbourne	92 (112)

Gerald Marchesi (4 December 1928 – 12 June 1990) was an Italian-Australian rules footballer who played for North Melbourne in the Victorian Football League (VFL).

A half forward flanker, Marchesi kicked 49 goals in 1953 which saw him top North Melbourne's goalkicking and finish fourth in the league. He was also chosen in the Sporting Globe's VFL team of the year for that season.

In 1954, his final season, Marchesi was club captain and led the Kangaroos into the finals.
