= Dean Dugdale =

Australian rules footballer

Personal information
- Full name: Dean Dugdale
- Born: 11 January 1963 (age 63)
- Original team: Doncaster Heights
- Height: 178 cm (5 ft 10 in)
- Weight: 80 kg (176 lb)

Playing career^{1}
Years	Club	Games (Goals)
1981–1985	North Melbourne	30 (12)
- ^{1} Playing statistics correct to the end of 1985.

Dean Dugdale (born 11 January 1963) is a former Australian rules footballer who played with North Melbourne in the Victorian Football League (VFL).

A recruit from Doncaster Heights, Dugdale first broke into the North Melbourne team as an 18-year-old late in the 1981 VFL season. His brother, Glenn Dugdale, also played with him at North Melbourne. Two teammates, David Dench and Ken Montgomery, had early in their career played with John Dugdale, the father of Dean and Glenn.

Dugdale played with North Melbourne for five seasons, for 30 league appearances. He was in the North Melbourne side which lost to the Swans in the final of the 1982 Escort Championships.
