= Allan Mennie =

Australian rules footballer (1935–2018)

Personal information
- Full name: Allan Charles Mennie
- Born: 27 April 1935
- Died: 29 December 2018 (aged 83)
- Original team: Mentone / Seaford
- Height: 175 cm (5 ft 9 in)
- Weight: 73 kg (161 lb)

Playing career^{1}
Years	Club	Games (Goals)
1955–1956	St Kilda	8 (0)
- ^{1} Playing statistics correct to the end of 1956.

Allan Charles Mennie (27 April 1935 – 29 December 2018) was an Australian rules footballer who played for the St Kilda Football Club in the Victorian Football League (VFL).
