= Ray Reed (footballer) =

Australian rules footballer

Personal information
- Full name: Ray Reed
- Born: 24 April 1934 (age 92)
- Original team: South Melbourne Districts
- Height: 175 cm (5 ft 9 in)
- Weight: 73 kg (161 lb)

Playing career^{1}
Years	Club	Games (Goals)
1955–56	South Melbourne	10 (1)
- ^{1} Playing statistics correct to the end of 1956.

Ray Reed (born 24 April 1934) is a former Australian rules footballer who played with South Melbourne in the Victorian Football League (VFL).
