= 1955 VFL season =

59th season of the Victorian Football League (VFL)

1955 VFL premiership season
- Teams: 12
- Premiers: Melbourne; 7th premiership
- Minor premiers: Melbourne; 3rd minor premiership
- Brownlow Medallist: Fred Goldsmith (South Melbourne)
- Coleman Medallist: Noel Rayson (Geelong)
- Matches played: 112
- Highest: 88,053

The 1955 VFL season was the 59th season of the Victorian Football League (VFL), the highest level senior Australian rules football competition in Victoria. The season featured twelve clubs, ran from 16 April until 17 September, and comprised an 18-game home-and-away season followed by a finals series featuring the top four clubs.

The premiership was won by the Melbourne Football Club for the seventh time, after it defeated Collingwood by 28 points in the 1955 VFL Grand Final.

== Background ==
In 1955, the VFL competition consisted of twelve teams of 18 on-the-field players each, plus two substitute players, known as the 19th man and the 20th man. A player could be substituted for any reason; however, once substituted, a player could not return to the field of play under any circumstances.

Teams played each other in a home-and-away season of 18 rounds; matches 12 to 18 were the "home-and-away reverse" of matches 1 to 7.

Once the 18 round home-and-away season had finished, the 1955 VFL Premiers were determined by the specific format and conventions of the Page–McIntyre system.

== Home-and-away season ==
=== Round 1 ===
Home team	Home team score	Away team	Away team score	Venue	Crowd	Date
Geelong	15.14 (104)	South Melbourne	9.12 (66)	Kardinia Park	20,976	16 April 1955
Fitzroy	13.15 (93)	Hawthorn	7.16 (58)	Brunswick Street Oval	16,000	16 April 1955
Collingwood	6.12 (48)	Footscray	15.14 (104)	Victoria Park	33,398	16 April 1955
Carlton	19.20 (134)	North Melbourne	10.5 (65)	Princes Park	25,041	16 April 1955
St Kilda	8.11 (59)	Melbourne	17.16 (118)	Junction Oval	20,000	16 April 1955
Richmond	9.23 (77)	Essendon	13.16 (94)	Punt Road Oval	30,000	16 April 1955

=== Round 2 ===
Home team	Home team score	Away team	Away team score	Venue	Crowd	Date
Footscray	16.16 (112)	Richmond	12.9 (81)	Western Oval	33,753	23 April 1955
Essendon	16.24 (120)	St Kilda	8.7 (55)	Windy Hill	18,000	23 April 1955
Melbourne	16.15 (111)	Geelong	8.14 (62)	MCG	32,363	23 April 1955
South Melbourne	16.11 (107)	Fitzroy	9.15 (69)	Lake Oval	18,000	23 April 1955
North Melbourne	9.16 (70)	Collingwood	21.11 (137)	Arden Street Oval	21,000	23 April 1955
Hawthorn	12.15 (87)	Carlton	9.6 (60)	Glenferrie Oval	19,000	23 April 1955

=== Round 3 ===
Home team	Home team score	Away team	Away team score	Venue	Crowd	Date
Geelong	15.13 (103)	Richmond	9.11 (65)	Kardinia Park	19,565	30 April 1955
Essendon	11.14 (80)	North Melbourne	9.15 (69)	Windy Hill	21,000	30 April 1955
Collingwood	16.20 (116)	St Kilda	8.11 (59)	Victoria Park	18,095	30 April 1955
Carlton	17.4 (106)	Fitzroy	6.13 (49)	Princes Park	23,435	30 April 1955
South Melbourne	7.14 (56)	Hawthorn	15.8 (98)	Lake Oval	18,000	30 April 1955
Melbourne	6.22 (58)	Footscray	6.10 (46)	MCG	49,280	30 April 1955

=== Round 4 ===
Home team	Home team score	Away team	Away team score	Venue	Crowd	Date
Richmond	15.20 (110)	South Melbourne	7.10 (52)	Punt Road Oval	20,000	7 May 1955
Fitzroy	10.13 (73)	Geelong	11.17 (83)	Brunswick Street Oval	16,000	7 May 1955
North Melbourne	9.7 (61)	Melbourne	10.14 (74)	Arden Street Oval	13,500	7 May 1955
Footscray	4.12 (36)	Essendon	2.11 (23)	Western Oval	36,615	7 May 1955
Hawthorn	12.12 (84)	Collingwood	12.3 (75)	Glenferrie Oval	26,000	7 May 1955
St Kilda	7.22 (64)	Carlton	15.9 (99)	Junction Oval	23,000	7 May 1955

=== Round 5 ===
Home team	Home team score	Away team	Away team score	Venue	Crowd	Date
Hawthorn	14.7 (91)	North Melbourne	13.15 (93)	Glenferrie Oval	15,000	14 May 1955
Essendon	8.11 (59)	Melbourne	10.13 (73)	Windy Hill	25,299	14 May 1955
Carlton	12.17 (89)	Collingwood	17.12 (114)	Princes Park	37,065	14 May 1955
South Melbourne	25.16 (166)	St Kilda	4.8 (32)	Lake Oval	15,000	14 May 1955
Geelong	12.12 (84)	Footscray	10.12 (72)	Kardinia Park	28,288	14 May 1955
Richmond	11.11 (77)	Fitzroy	15.9 (99)	Punt Road Oval	15,000	14 May 1955

=== Round 6 ===
Home team	Home team score	Away team	Away team score	Venue	Crowd	Date
North Melbourne	10.14 (74)	Richmond	7.10 (52)	Arden Street Oval	13,000	21 May 1955
Collingwood	15.11 (101)	Essendon	6.11 (47)	Victoria Park	35,000	21 May 1955
Carlton	11.9 (75)	South Melbourne	12.11 (83)	Princes Park	23,000	21 May 1955
Melbourne	11.5 (71)	Hawthorn	6.8 (44)	MCG	28,338	21 May 1955
St Kilda	4.5 (29)	Geelong	6.12 (48)	Junction Oval	11,000	21 May 1955
Footscray	8.10 (58)	Fitzroy	10.6 (66)	Western Oval	24,517	21 May 1955

=== Round 7 ===
Home team	Home team score	Away team	Away team score	Venue	Crowd	Date
Richmond	17.20 (122)	St Kilda	7.14 (56)	Punt Road Oval	12,500	28 May 1955
Footscray	10.9 (69)	North Melbourne	8.14 (62)	Western Oval	26,086	28 May 1955
Essendon	9.11 (65)	Hawthorn	10.10 (70)	Windy Hill	20,000	28 May 1955
South Melbourne	10.11 (71)	Melbourne	11.6 (72)	Lake Oval	24,000	28 May 1955
Fitzroy	6.9 (45)	Collingwood	16.13 (109)	Brunswick Street Oval	30,000	28 May 1955
Geelong	12.12 (84)	Carlton	10.9 (69)	Kardinia Park	21,088	28 May 1955

=== Round 8 ===
Home team	Home team score	Away team	Away team score	Venue	Crowd	Date
Hawthorn	9.8 (62)	Richmond	8.12 (60)	Glenferrie Oval	19,600	4 June 1955
Essendon	13.14 (92)	South Melbourne	7.12 (54)	Windy Hill	23,500	4 June 1955
Collingwood	11.11 (77)	Geelong	10.7 (67)	Victoria Park	34,000	4 June 1955
St Kilda	4.10 (34)	Footscray	13.7 (85)	Junction Oval	19,250	4 June 1955
North Melbourne	11.5 (71)	Fitzroy	12.16 (88)	Arden Street Oval	13,000	4 June 1955
Melbourne	20.15 (135)	Carlton	9.16 (70)	MCG	34,670	4 June 1955

=== Round 9 ===
Home team	Home team score	Away team	Away team score	Venue	Crowd	Date
Footscray	17.12 (114)	Hawthorn	8.11 (59)	Western Oval	28,807	11 June 1955
Carlton	4.4 (28)	Essendon	11.20 (86)	Princes Park	29,555	11 June 1955
South Melbourne	8.15 (63)	Collingwood	9.18 (72)	Lake Oval	35,000	11 June 1955
Melbourne	13.16 (94)	Richmond	11.12 (78)	MCG	39,949	13 June 1955
Fitzroy	19.14 (128)	St Kilda	7.12 (54)	Brunswick Street Oval	14,000	13 June 1955
North Melbourne	12.9 (81)	Geelong	13.17 (95)	Arden Street Oval	24,000	13 June 1955

=== Round 10 ===
Home team	Home team score	Away team	Away team score	Venue	Crowd	Date
Hawthorn	12.9 (81)	St Kilda	6.7 (43)	Glenferrie Oval	10,500	25 June 1955
Fitzroy	5.9 (39)	Melbourne	10.11 (71)	Brunswick Street Oval	21,000	25 June 1955
Carlton	6.7 (43)	Footscray	11.15 (81)	Princes Park	20,576	25 June 1955
South Melbourne	10.10 (70)	North Melbourne	8.10 (58)	Lake Oval	16,000	25 June 1955
Geelong	10.5 (65)	Essendon	7.10 (52)	Kardinia Park	23,654	25 June 1955
Richmond	6.12 (48)	Collingwood	14.14 (98)	Punt Road Oval	29,000	25 June 1955

=== Round 11 ===
Home team	Home team score	Away team	Away team score	Venue	Crowd	Date
Geelong	16.13 (109)	Hawthorn	7.8 (50)	Kardinia Park	17,238	2 July 1955
Footscray	11.16 (82)	South Melbourne	6.13 (49)	Western Oval	26,697	2 July 1955
Essendon	8.20 (68)	Fitzroy	5.12 (42)	Windy Hill	19,000	2 July 1955
Collingwood	7.6 (48)	Melbourne	5.15 (45)	Victoria Park	40,000	2 July 1955
St Kilda	10.8 (68)	North Melbourne	8.13 (61)	Junction Oval	10,500	2 July 1955
Richmond	14.12 (96)	Carlton	7.7 (49)	Punt Road Oval	16,000	2 July 1955

=== Round 12 ===
Home team	Home team score	Away team	Away team score	Venue	Crowd	Date
Melbourne	17.16 (118)	St Kilda	3.3 (21)	MCG	15,624	9 July 1955
Essendon	14.7 (91)	Richmond	5.20 (50)	Windy Hill	19,500	9 July 1955
South Melbourne	13.10 (88)	Geelong	15.9 (99)	Lake Oval	17,000	9 July 1955
Hawthorn	18.12 (120)	Fitzroy	9.5 (59)	Glenferrie Oval	10,500	9 July 1955
Footscray	5.13 (43)	Collingwood	5.7 (37)	Western Oval	42,354	9 July 1955
North Melbourne	13.10 (88)	Carlton	16.9 (105)	Arden Street Oval	12,000	9 July 1955

=== Round 13 ===
Home team	Home team score	Away team	Away team score	Venue	Crowd	Date
Geelong	10.11 (71)	Melbourne	6.16 (52)	Kardinia Park	26,755	16 July 1955
Fitzroy	14.16 (100)	South Melbourne	6.10 (46)	Brunswick Street Oval	12,500	16 July 1955
Collingwood	15.9 (99)	North Melbourne	13.14 (92)	Victoria Park	16,813	16 July 1955
Carlton	10.19 (79)	Hawthorn	9.9 (63)	Princes Park	15,763	16 July 1955
Richmond	8.9 (57)	Footscray	6.12 (48)	Punt Road Oval	17,500	16 July 1955
St Kilda	5.7 (37)	Essendon	10.22 (82)	Junction Oval	12,250	16 July 1955

=== Round 14 ===
Home team	Home team score	Away team	Away team score	Venue	Crowd	Date
Hawthorn	10.11 (71)	South Melbourne	6.15 (51)	Glenferrie Oval	12,100	23 July 1955
Footscray	11.8 (74)	Melbourne	9.19 (73)	Western Oval	32,735	23 July 1955
Richmond	14.16 (100)	Geelong	14.13 (97)	Punt Road Oval	25,000	23 July 1955
North Melbourne	9.7 (61)	Essendon	17.23 (125)	Arden Street Oval	18,000	23 July 1955
St Kilda	10.11 (71)	Collingwood	16.20 (116)	Junction Oval	18,500	23 July 1955
Fitzroy	11.14 (80)	Carlton	13.16 (94)	Brunswick Street Oval	19,500	23 July 1955

=== Round 15 ===
Home team	Home team score	Away team	Away team score	Venue	Crowd	Date
Melbourne	12.18 (90)	North Melbourne	8.15 (63)	MCG	15,486	30 July 1955
Essendon	9.18 (72)	Footscray	5.22 (52)	Windy Hill	32,000	30 July 1955
Collingwood	10.11 (71)	Hawthorn	5.6 (36)	Victoria Park	16,000	30 July 1955
Carlton	11.21 (87)	St Kilda	3.13 (31)	Princes Park	9,742	30 July 1955
South Melbourne	14.9 (93)	Richmond	13.16 (94)	Lake Oval	16,000	30 July 1955
Geelong	12.14 (86)	Fitzroy	9.11 (65)	Kardinia Park	14,033	30 July 1955

=== Round 16 ===
Home team	Home team score	Away team	Away team score	Venue	Crowd	Date
St Kilda	8.5 (53)	South Melbourne	11.16 (82)	Junction Oval	10,150	6 August 1955
Footscray	10.13 (73)	Geelong	10.16 (76)	Western Oval	33,902	6 August 1955
Fitzroy	6.17 (53)	Richmond	11.9 (75)	Brunswick Street Oval	14,000	6 August 1955
North Melbourne	8.12 (60)	Hawthorn	8.5 (53)	Arden Street Oval	9,000	6 August 1955
Melbourne	16.23 (119)	Essendon	7.12 (54)	MCG	49,352	6 August 1955
Collingwood	12.17 (89)	Carlton	7.10 (52)	Victoria Park	28,000	6 August 1955

=== Round 17 ===
Home team	Home team score	Away team	Away team score	Venue	Crowd	Date
Hawthorn	12.13 (85)	Melbourne	13.13 (91)	Glenferrie Oval	16,000	13 August 1955
Geelong	19.17 (131)	St Kilda	7.10 (52)	Kardinia Park	13,444	13 August 1955
Fitzroy	9.7 (61)	Footscray	11.13 (79)	Brunswick Street Oval	20,000	13 August 1955
Richmond	12.20 (92)	North Melbourne	10.9 (69)	Punt Road Oval	14,500	13 August 1955
Essendon	19.19 (133)	Collingwood	8.12 (60)	Windy Hill	34,000	13 August 1955
South Melbourne	6.12 (48)	Carlton	12.7 (79)	Lake Oval	18,000	13 August 1955

=== Round 18 ===
Home team	Home team score	Away team	Away team score	Venue	Crowd	Date
Melbourne	12.22 (94)	South Melbourne	4.7 (31)	MCG	19,484	20 August 1955
Collingwood	7.17 (59)	Fitzroy	7.7 (49)	Victoria Park	19,270	20 August 1955
Carlton	10.6 (66)	Geelong	8.12 (60)	Princes Park	22,482	20 August 1955
St Kilda	6.7 (43)	Richmond	19.23 (137)	Junction Oval	13,000	20 August 1955
North Melbourne	5.5 (35)	Footscray	14.11 (95)	Arden Street Oval	20,000	20 August 1955
Hawthorn	7.8 (50)	Essendon	13.14 (92)	Glenferrie Oval	24,500	20 August 1955

== Ladder ==
(P)	Premiers
	Qualified for finals

#	Team	P	W	L	D	PF	PA	%	Pts
1	Melbourne (P)	18	15	3	0	1559	1036	150.5	60
2	Collingwood	18	14	4	0	1526	1197	127.5	56
3	Geelong	18	14	4	0	1524	1241	122.8	56
4	Essendon	18	12	6	0	1435	1099	130.6	48
5	Footscray	18	12	6	0	1323	1018	130.0	48
6	Richmond	18	9	9	0	1471	1387	106.1	36
7	Carlton	18	9	9	0	1384	1403	98.6	36
8	Hawthorn	18	8	10	0	1262	1342	94.0	32
9	Fitzroy	18	6	12	0	1258	1421	88.5	24
10	South Melbourne	18	5	13	0	1276	1454	87.8	20
11	North Melbourne	18	3	15	0	1233	1617	76.3	12
12	St Kilda	18	1	17	0	861	1897	45.4	4

Rules for classification: 1. premiership points; 2. percentage; 3. points for
Average score: 74.6
Source: AFL Tables

== Finals series ==
=== Semi-finals ===
Team	1 Qtr	2 Qtr	3 Qtr	Final
Geelong	3.1	6.4	7.6	9.7 (61)
Essendon	0.2	1.4	2.7	7.11 (53)
Attendance: 68,109

Team	1 Qtr	2 Qtr	3 Qtr	Final
Melbourne	2.4	4.7	7.8	8.8 (56)
Collingwood	1.3	4.5	6.7	6.9 (45)
Attendance: 59,015

=== Preliminary final ===
Team	1 Qtr	2 Qtr	3 Qtr	Final
Collingwood	5.1	8.4	10.9	14.12 (96)
Geelong	3.3	5.3	9.6	13.6 (84)
Attendance: 70,430

=== Grand final ===
Team	1 Qtr	2 Qtr	3 Qtr	Final
Melbourne	2.3	3.10	4.13	8.16 (64)
Collingwood	2.2	2.5	4.6	5.6 (36)
Attendance: 88,053

== Season notes ==
- The 15-yard penalty (precursor to the modern 50-metre penalty) was introduced to the rules nationally by the Australian National Football Council, allowing the umpire to advance the spot of a mark or free kick by 15 yards in the event of crude, late challenges on the player with the mark.
- The highest aggregate score in a match for the year was only 207 points, which is the lowest for any VFL/AFL season since 1922. There was no match in which both teams scored more than 100 points.
- St Kilda's average score of 47.8 per match was the lowest average by any team since 1919.
- Towards the end of the Round 4 match between Fitzroy and Geelong at the Brunswick Street Oval Fitzroy full-forward Tony Ongarello was so upset with his own inaccurate kicking that, upon taking a mark, he indicated to the field umpire that he was going to kick a place-kick. He scored a goal. He was so impressed that he kicked one more goal in that match with a place kick. He kicked several goals later in the season from place kicks as well, but ultimately had little more success with place kicks than he had with punts. Although it has never been (and is still not) against the rules to do so, he is on record as the last player ever to score a goal with a place kick in a senior VFL match. Ongarello was not the first player to attempt to revive the place kick in 1955: South Melbourne full forward Colin Vance had unsuccessfully attempted a place kick for goal on debut three weeks earlier.
- After North Melbourne's humiliating Round 11 loss to St Kilda – who had not won a match since Round 16 1954 and were now captain-coached by former North Melbourne star Les Foote – the North Melbourne committee suspended two of its senior players (Mick Grambeau and Laurie Icke) indefinitely from both playing and training with the club for "not having tried hard enough" in the match.
- Defending Premiers Footscray missed out on a place in the Final Four by just 0.6%.
- In the dying minutes of the Grand Final, Melbourne's 19th man Frank "Bluey" Adams rushed from the bench to take his place on the field and collided with the (unsighted by Adams) Collingwood winger Des Healey who, up to that stage, had been one of the best on the ground. Both participants in this horrific head clash were carried off unconscious. Healey had his nose broken in five places, a fractured skull, and never played for Collingwood again. "Bluey" Adams 15-second playing time is the shortest in VFL history.(Ross, 1996, p. 202).

== Awards ==
- The 1955 VFL Premiership team was Melbourne.
- The VFL's leading goalkicker was Noel Rayson of Geelong with 80 goals (including 3 goals in the final series).
- The winner of the 1955 Brownlow Medal was Fred Goldsmith of South Melbourne with 21 votes.
- St. Kilda took the "wooden spoon" in 1955.

== See also ==
- List of VFL debuts in 1955

== Sources ==
- 1955 VFL season at AFL Tables
- 1955 VFL season at Australian Football
