= County of Talbot, Victoria =

Coordinates: 37°15′S 144°00′E

Talbot
- Cadastral division
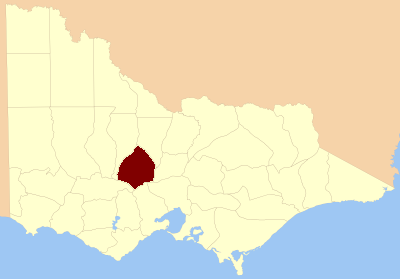
- Location in Victoria
- Country: Australia
- State: Victoria
- Established: 10 January 1849

Area
  - Total: 4,198 km^{2} (1,621 sq mi)
Lands administrative divisions around Talbot
Gladstone	Gladstone	Bendigo
Gladstone	Talbot	Dalhousie
Ripon	Grant	Bourke

The County of Talbot is one of the 37 counties of Victoria which are part of the cadastral divisions of Australia, used for land titles. It is located to the north of Ballarat, and includes Castlemaine. The county was proclaimed in 1849.

== Parishes ==
Parishes include:

- Addington
- Amherst
- Ascot
- Baringhup
- Beckworth
- Bradford
- Bullarook
- Bullarto
- Bung Bong
- Burke
- Campbelltown
- Caralulup
- Carisbrook
- Castlemaine
- Chewton
- Clunes
- Coliban
- Craigie
- Creswick
- Drummond
- Eddington
- Edgecombe
- Eglinton
- Elphinstone
- Ercildoun
- Faraday
- Franklin
- Fryers
- Glendaruel
- Glengower
- Glenlyon
- Guildford
- Harcourt
- Hawkestone
- Holcombe
- Lexton
- Lillicur
- Maldon
- Maryborough
- Moolort
- Muckleford
- Neereman
- Rodborough
- Sandon
- Smeaton
- Spring Hill
- Strangeways
- Sutton Grange
- Tarrengower
- Tourello
- Walmer
- Wombat
- Yandoit
