= List of places of worship in Mount Alexander Shire =

This is a list of places of worship in Mount Alexander Shire, a local government area in the state of Victoria, Australia. The list includes active and former churches and other religious buildings representing a variety of Christian denominations and other faiths.

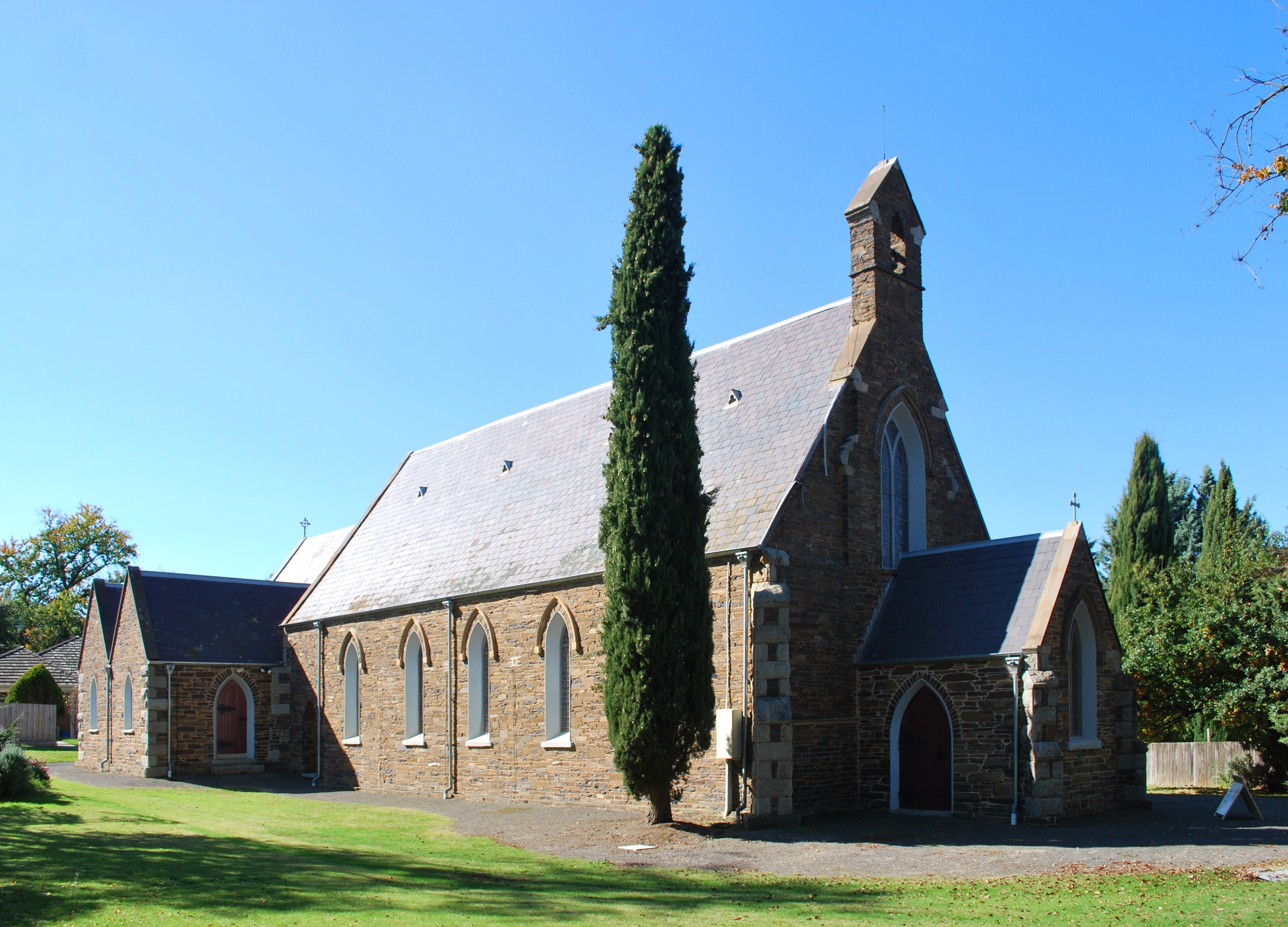
Holy Trinity Anglican Church, Maldon

== Heritage listing status ==
Style	Status
Yes	Listed on the Victorian Heritage Register
–	Not listed

== Current places of worship ==
Current places of worship
Name	Image	Location	Denomination/ Affiliation	Heritage listing	Notes	Refs
Ss Joseph and Anasimone Coptic Orthodox Church (Castlemaine Congregational (Independent) Church) (Castlemaine Presbyterian Church)		Castlemaine; 37.063959°S 144.215858°E	Coptic Orthodox (formerly Congregational (Independent), then Presbyterian)	Yes		
Castlemaine Uniting Church		Castlemaine; 37.064616°S 144.215213°E	Uniting (formerly Presbyterian)	Yes		
Christ Church, Castlemaine		Castlemaine; 37.065707°S 144.214952°E	Anglican	Yes		
St Mary's Catholic Church, Castlemaine		Castlemaine; 37.063975°S 144.220296°E	Catholic	–		
Castlemaine Seventh-day Adventist Church, Castlemaine Lutheran Church		Castlemaine; 37.061910°S 144.217755°E	Seventh-day Adventist, Lutheran (formerly Methodist)	–		
Castlemaine Baptist Church		Castlemaine; 37.063503°S 144.216391°E	Baptist	–		
Castlemaine Bible Christian Church		Castlemaine; 37.060689°S 144.217340°E	Bible Christian (Methodist)	–		
Castlemaine Church of Christ		Castlemaine; 37.043737°S 144.227931°E	Church of Christ	–		
St John's Anglican Church, Chewton		Chewton; 37.083016°S 144.257374°E	Anglican	–		
Our Lady of Perpetual Help Greek Orthodox Church		Campbells Creek; 37.109734°S 144.202415°E	Greek Orthodox	–		
St Anne's Catholic Church, Newstead		Newstead; 37.112360°S 144.056773°E	Catholic	–		
All Saints' Anglican Church, Newstead		Newstead; 37.109601°S 144.062491°E	Anglican	–		
Maldon Baptist Church		Maldon; 36.994940°S 144.069236°E	Baptist	–		
Holy Trinity Anglican Church, Maldon		Maldon; 36.995407°S 144.068112°E	Anglican	Yes		
St Brigid's Catholic Church, Maldon		Maldon; 36.991837°S 144.063287°E	Catholic	–		
Sutton Grange Uniting Church		Sutton Grange; 36.987579°S 144.357844°E	Uniting (formerly Congregational (Independent))	–		
Harcourt Uniting Church		Harcourt; 36.998208°S 144.263006°E	Uniting (formerly Methodist)	Yes		
St Laurence O'Toole Catholic Church		Sandon; 37.168786°S 144.039840°E	Catholic	–		
Barfold Union Church		Barfold; 37.102648°S 144.511879°E	Uniting, Community Church	–		

== Former places of worship ==
Former places of worship
Name	Image	Location	Denomination/ Affiliation	Heritage listing	Notes	Refs
Holy Trinity Anglican Church, Taradale		Taradale; 37.137559°S 144.350288°E	Anglican	Yes		
Castlemaine Church of Christ (old)		Castlemaine; 37.062207°S 144.216420°E	Church of Christ	–		
Chinese Christian Church		Castlemaine; 37.065952°S 144.223667°E	Methodist	(non-existant)		
Wesley Hill Uniting Church		Wesley Hill (Chewton); 37.072500°S 144.236227°E	Uniting (formerly Methodist)	–		
Castlemaine Primitive Methodist Church		Castlemaine; 37.071556°S 144.204261°E	Methodist (Primitive Methodist)	Yes		
Chewton Primitive Methodist Church (Jubilee Primitive Methodist Church)		Chewton; 37.080894°S 144.256204°E	Methodist (Primitive Methodist)	Yes		
Chewton Methodist Church		Chewton; 37.080470°S 144.262430°E	Methodist	–		
Chewton Congregational (Independent) Church		Chewton; 37.080922°S 144.260979°E	Congregational (Independent)	–		
Campbells Creek (Castlemaine) Presbyterian Church		Campbells Creek; 37.088479°S 144.205306°E	Presbyterian	–		
Holy Trinity Anglican Church, Campbells Creek		Campbells Creek; 37.090030°S 144.204789°E	Anglican	–		
Vaughan Methodist Church		Vaughan; 37.155899°S 144.206713°E	Methodist	Yes		
Newstead Primitive Methodist Church		Newstead; 37.106528°S 144.061463°E	Methodist (Primitive Methodist)	–		
St Andrew's Presbyterian Church, Newstead		Newstead; 37.115836°S 144.056796°E	Presbyterian	Yes		
Newstead Uniting Church		Newstead; 37.106072°S 144.064536°E	Uniting (formerly Methodist)	–		
Maldon Uniting Church		Maldon; 36.997307°S 144.067140°E	Uniting (formerly Methodist)	–		
Maldon Welsh Baptist Church		Maldon; 36.995770°S 144.069327°E	Baptist	Yes		
Maldon Welsh Congregational (Independent) Church		Maldon; 36.992987°S 144.068715°E	Congregational (Independent)	Yes		
Scots Presbyterian Church, Maldon		Maldon; 36.994739°S 144.069975°E	Presbyterian	–		
Fryerstown Methodist Church		Fryerstown; 37.137182°S 144.249823°E	Methodist	Yes		
All Saints' Anglican Church, Fryerstown		Fryerstown; 37.142529°S 144.249165°E	Anglican	–		
Guildford Methodist Church		Guildford; 37.151845°S 144.165344°E	Methodist	–		
St Thomas of Villanova Catholic Church		Guildford; 37.151861°S 144.165772°E	Catholic	–		
St John the Evangelist Catholic Church		Taradale; 37.137171°S 144.345282°E	Catholic	–		
Taradale Methodist Church		Taradale; 37.138031°S 144.346582°E	Methodist	–		
St Mary's Anglican Church, Elphinstone		Elphinstone; 37.103051°S 144.327382°E	Anglican	–		
Faraday Methodist Church		Faraday; 37.045711°S 144.290355°E	Methodist	–		
Harcourt Church of Christ		Harcourt; 37.012849°S 144.244750°E	Church of Christ	–		
Strangways Methodist Church		Strangways; 37.136397°S 144.076439°E	Methodist	–		
Yapeen Methodist Church		Yapeen; 37.120813°S 144.179622°E	Methodist	–		
Sandon Primitive Methodist Church		Sandon; 37.169653°S 144.037346°E	Methodist (Primitive Methodist)	–		
