= Bradford, Victoria =

Bradford
- Town
- Coordinates: 36.918528°S 144.067643°E
- Country: Australia
- State: Victoria
- LGA: Shire of Mount Alexander

Government
  - State electorate: Bendigo West
  - Federal division: Murray

Population
  - Total: 9 (2016 census)
- Postcode: 3463
Localities around Bradford
Eastville	Shelbourne	Ravenswood
Lockwood South	Bradford	Ravenswood South
Baringhup	Nuggetty	Walmer

Bradford is a locality in the Shire of Mount Alexander, Victoria, Australia. At the 2016 census, Bradford had a population of 9.

== History ==
There are conflicting accounts about the origin of Bradford's name. According to Thomas O'Callaghan's 1918 book "Names of Victorian Railways Stations", Bradford is named after the city of Bradford in West Yorkshire, United Kingdom, while Les Blake's 1977 book "Place Names of Victoria" states that Bradford is named after the geologist William Bradford.

Pollard railway station once served Bradford with passenger and goods trains. The last service ran on 15 January 1969.
