= Calder Highway =

Highway in Victoria

Calder Highway Calder Freeway Victoria–New South Wales
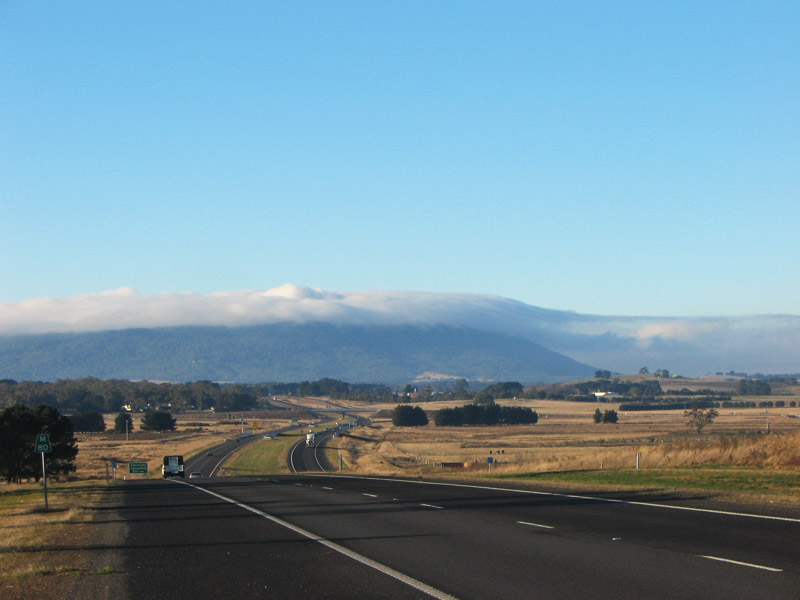
- Calder Freeway facing Mount Macedon
- Coordinates: 34.111291°S 141.986859°E (Northwest end); 37.733940°S 144.892831°E (Southeast end)

General information
- Type: Highway
- Length: 560.9 km (349 mi)
- Gazetted: December 1913 (as Main Road); July 1925 (as State Highway)
- Route number(s): A79 (1997–present) (VIC/NSW border–Ravenswood); M79 (1997–present) (Ravenswood–Niddrie); A790 (1997–present) (Calder Alternative Highway: Marong–Ravenswood); Concurrencies: A300 (1997–present) (Bendigo–Harcourt)
- Former route number: Metro Route 40 (1989–2020) (Keilor–Niddrie); National Route 79 (1955–1997/2013) (VIC/NSW) Entire route; Freeway Route 90 (1972–1987) (Keilor–Niddrie); Alternative National Route 79 (1986–1997) (Calder Alternative Highway: Marong–Ravenswood); Concurrencies: State Route 149 (1986–1997) (Bendigo–Harcourt)

Major junctions
- Northwest end: Silver City Highway; Curlwaa, New South Wales
- Sturt Highway; Mallee Highway; Sunraysia Highway; Borung Highway; Calder Alternative Highway; Loddon Valley Highway; Midland Highway; Pyrenees Highway; Melton Highway; Western Ring Road
- Southeast end: Tullamarine Freeway; Airport West, Melbourne

Location(s)
- Region: Loddon Mallee, Grampians, Greater Melbourne
- Major settlements: Mildura, Ouyen, Charlton, Bendigo, Harcourt, Malmsbury, Kyneton, Woodend, Macedon, Gisborne, Diggers Rest, Sunbury

Highway system
- Highways in Australia; National Highway • Freeways in Australia; Highways in Victoria; Highways in New South Wales

Calder Highway is a rural highway in Australia, linking Mildura and the Victoria/New South Wales border to Bendigo, in North Central Victoria. South of Bendigo, where the former highway has been upgraded to freeway-standard, Calder Freeway links to Melbourne, subsuming former alignments of Calder Highway; the Victorian Government completed the conversion to freeway standard from Melbourne to Bendigo on 20 April 2009.

Calder Alternate Highway connects to Calder Highway at either end – just north of Ravenswood, and at Marong – and provides a bypass west of Bendigo.

== Route ==
Calder Highway commences at the intersection with Silver City Highway in Curlwaa (officially a branch of Silver City Highway, yet sign-posted as Calder Highway) and crosses the Murray River into Victoria over the Abbotsford Bridge, then continues in a southeasterly direction as a two-lane, single carriageway rural highway through Merbein and intersects with Sturt Highway just outside the major regional town of Mildura, where widens to a four-lane, dual-carriageway road through southern Mildura and Irymple, in the state's north-west. It narrows back to a two-lane single carriageway road and continues in a southerly direction, meeting Mallee Highway at Ouyen, then in a south-easterly direction through Sea Lake, Wycheproof, Charlton and meeting the northern end of Calder Alternative Highway at Marong eventually to the western suburbs of Bendigo, where it widens to a four-lane, dual-carriageway road as it weaves through the rural city, intersecting with Loddon Valley Highway and meeting with Midland Highway, where it narrows back to a single carriageway road and shares a concurrency through south-western Bendigo, widening again to a dual carriageway through Kangaroo Flat to eventually meet the southern end of Calder Alternative Highway at an interchange in Ravenswood.

Calder Highway becomes Calder Freeway at the Ravenswood interchange and continues in southerly direction as a four-lane, dual-carriageway rural freeway which bypasses the towns along the highway's former alignment. Calder Freeway passes Harcourt – where the shared concurrency with Midland Highway ends, as it travels in a south-westerly direction to the major regional centres of Castlemaine, Ballarat, and Geelong – and continues in a south-easterly direction past Elphinstone, Kyneton, Woodend and Gisborne, to reach the western suburban fringe of Melbourne. It continues in a south-easterly, and then easterly, direction past Calder Park Raceway and Keilor, before eventually terminating at an interchange with Tullamarine Freeway at Airport West.

Within the urban section of Calder Freeway (between Kings Road and Tullamarine Freeway), the standard travel time, in each direction, is 10 minutes; 5 minutes between Kings Road and the Western Ring Road and 5 minutes between the Ring Road and Tullamarine Freeway.

Between Red Cliffs and Wycheproof the highway has a speed limit of 110 km/h.

== History ==
The passing of the Country Roads Act 1912 through the Parliament of Victoria provided for the establishment of the Country Roads Board (later VicRoads) and their ability to declare Main Roads, taking responsibility for the management, construction and care of the state's major roads from local municipalities. (Melbourne-)Bendigo Road was declared a Main Road over a period of months, from 30 December 1913 (Castlemaine via Harcourt to Ravenswood), to 30 November 1914 (from Keilor through Diggers Rest to Gisborne, and from Woodend through Kyneton and Elphinstone to Castlemaine), to 20 September 1915 (from Ravenswood to Bendigo); (Ouyen-)Mildura Road from Ouyen to Hattah, and Wycheproof-Sea Lake Road from Wycheproof to Sea Lake were declared Main Roads on 14 December 1914; and (Charlton-)Wycheproof Road between Charlton and Wycheproof was declared a Main Road on 28 May 1915; Charlton-(Bridgewater-)Bendigo Road was declared a Main Road, between Bridgewater and Wedderburn to Charlton on 28 May 1915, and between Bendigo and Bridgewater on 20 September 1915; and (Ouyen-)Sea Lake Road was declared a Main Road, from Ouyen to Mittyack on 14 December 1914, and between Mittyack and Sea Lake on 1 October 1921.

The passing of the Highways and Vehicles Act 1924 provided for the declaration of State Highways, roads two-thirds financed by the state government through the Country Roads Board. North Western Highway was declared a State Highway on 1 July 1925, cobbled from a collection of roads from Melbourne through Kyneton, Castlemaine, Bendigo, Sea Lake and Ouyen to Mildura (for a total of 324 miles), subsuming the original declarations of Melbourne-Bendigo Road, Charlton-Bridgewater-Bendigo Road, Charlton-Wycheproof Road, Wycheproof-Sea Lake Road, Ouyen-Sea Lake Road and Ouyen-Mildura Road as Main Roads. North-Western Highway was renamed Calder Highway on 18 December 1928, after William Calder, chairman of the Country Roads Board from 1913 to 1928. In the 1959/60 financial year, another section from Elphinstone to Harcourt was added as a deviation bypassing Castlemaine, along the former Elphinstone–Harcourt Road (already having been declared a Main Road by the Country Roads Board in 1937/38 financial year); the previous alignments of Calder Highway from Elphinstone to Castlemaine, and Castlemaine to Harcourt, were subsumed into Pyrenees Highway and Midland Highway respectively. Calder Alternative Highway was declared on 9 May 1983, along the former Ravenswood–Marong Road.

Originally, Calder Highway ran through northwestern Melbourne as an undivided highway, through Niddrie as Keilor Road and terminating in Essendon; traffic continued south along Mount Alexander Road to reach central Melbourne. Keilor Road – already heavily congested and supporting a tram line – was eventually bypassed by a freeway-standard road – the first section of Calder Freeway – in 1972 to terminate at a junction with Lancefield Road (later upgraded to Tullamarine Freeway), rejoining Calder Highway at the western end of Niddrie; the freeway-standard was extended further west to East Keilor (the future location of the Western Ring Road interchange) in 1975, and to Keilor by the early 1980s, over time stretching west to ultimately become a project to convert the road to freeway standard all the way to Bendigo; the freeway upgrade has made sections of the original Calder Highway redundant, either subsumed into the new freeway or acting as local access roads.

Calder Highway was later signed National Route 79 in 1955; when Midland Highway was allocated State Route 149 in 1986, it shared it as a concurrency along Calder Highway between Harcourt and Bendigo. With Victoria's conversion to the newer alphanumeric system in the late 1990s this was altered to route A79 for the highway portion, and route M79 for the freeway portion into Melbourne (and the concurrency with Midland Highway was replaced with route A300); the New South Wales section was left unallocated when they switched to the alphanumeric system in 2013. Calder Alternative Highway was signed Alternative National Route 79 between Ravenswood and Marong, and was later replaced by route A790.

The Howard government broadened the criteria under which roads qualify for Commonwealth road funding by introducing Roads of National Importance program in the 1996–97 financial year where such declarations were based on the recognition that roads outside the National Highway system also provide social benefits, and were funded jointly with the States and Territories usually on a 50:50 basis. As a major road link between Melbourne, Bendigo, and the state's northwest, supporting the region's primary manufacturing and tourism industries, Calder Highway was declared a Road of National Importance between Melbourne and Bendigo in December 1996.

The passing of the Road Management Act 2004 granted the responsibility of overall management and development of Victoria's major arterial roads to VicRoads: in 2004, VicRoads re-declared the road as Calder Alternative Highway (Arterial #6200) between Ravenswood and Marong, and in 2011 as Calder Highway (Arterial #6530) between the border with New South Wales at Yelta and the interchange with Calder Alternate Highway and Ravenswood Street in Ravenswood, and as Calder Freeway (Freeway #1530) between Ravenswood and Tullamarine Freeway, Airport West.

=== Timeline of construction ===
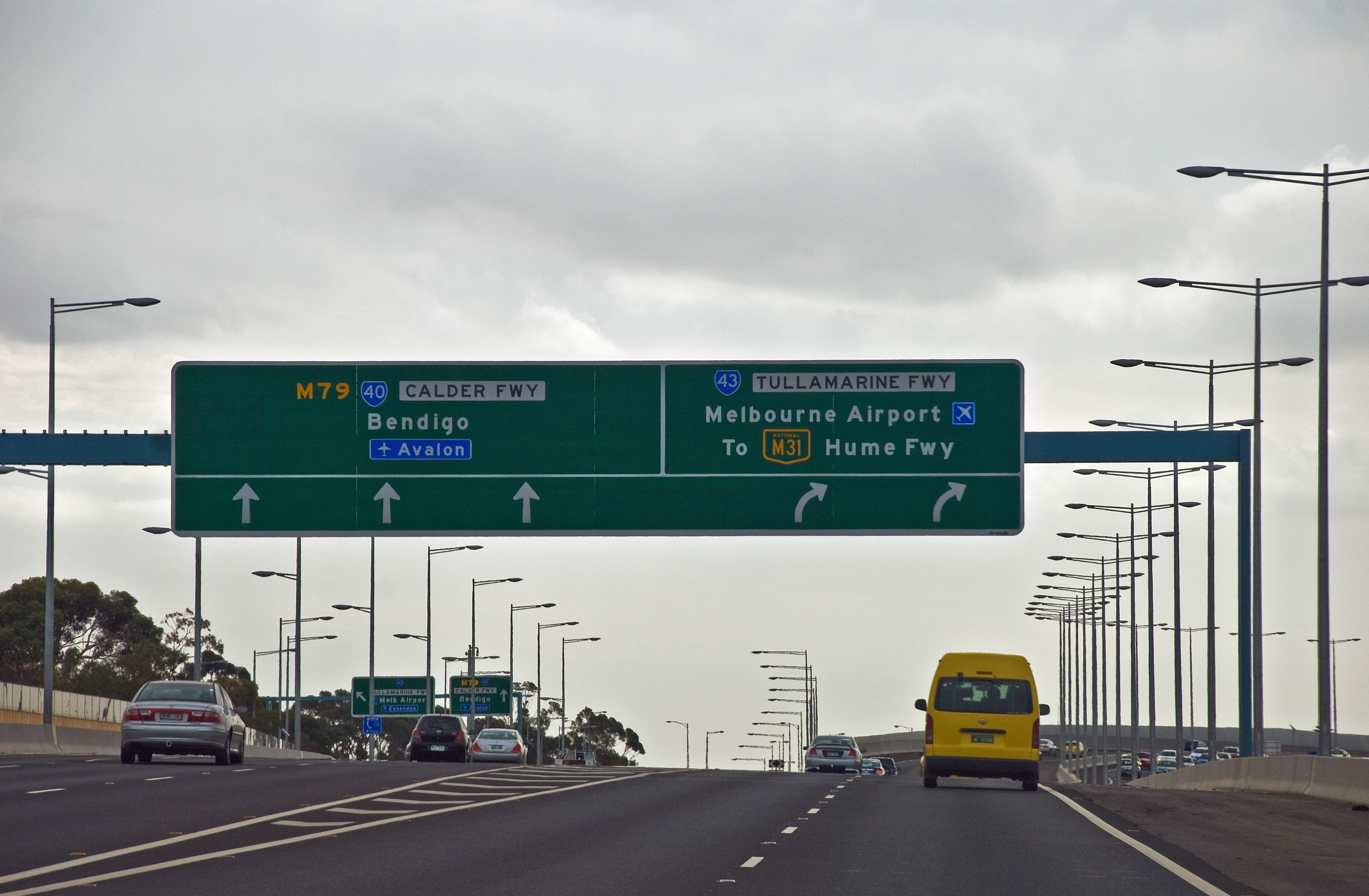
Tullamarine Freeway meets Calder Freeway.

- 1950–54 – Calder Highway, straightening of the "Hattah deviation", a 21-mile (34 km) circuitous course through Hattah replaced by 14.6 miles (23.5 km) of straight alignment, south of Nowingi, started construction in 1950, was delayed a year in 1952 due to lack of funds, and eventually completed two years later in 1954.
- 1972 – Calder Freeway, initial 1.2 miles (1.9 km) section of freeway with 3 lanes in each direction, from the Tullamarine Freeway/Lancefield Road intersection to Calder Highway at Niddrie, opened by Minister for Local Government, the Hon. A J Hunt MLC, 21 April 1972, at a cost of $3 million.
- 1975 – Extended 2 km from The Avenue in Niddrie to Erebus Street in Keilor East, opened December 1974 at a cost of $2.5 million.
- 1982 – Extended 3.8 km from Erebus Street to Arundel Road, Keilor, with two lanes each direction plus emergency stopping lanes, opened by Minister for Transport, the Hon S M Crabb MP, 18 May 1982, at a cost of $15.5 million.
- 1984 – Keilor bypass, Bendigo-bound carriageway from Arundel Road to west of Oakbank Road, opened by Assistant Minister of Transport, the Hon Jack Simpson MP, 17 April 1984; the opening of this carriageway completed the bypass of Keilor. The cost of the entire bypass from Erebus Street to west of Oakbank Road was $30 million.
- 1989 – Gisborne bypass opened 17 March 1989. The 6 km bypass cost A$25m.
- 1990/1991 – Oakbank Road, Keilor North to Duncans Lane, Diggers Rest. 7.7 km of newly duplicated '2 lane carriageway' opened to traffic at a cost of A$14m. No exact date was given, however VicRoads Annual Reports cover the previous financial year.
- 1991/1992 – 2 km of duplication completed at Ravenswood during 1991/1992 at a cost of A$1.3m.
- 1993 – Diggers Rest bypass. $A32m 6.5 km bypass opened to traffic in July 1993, followed by the Vinyard Road interchange in November 1993.
- 1994 – Ravenswood section. Duplication of the highway completed 'in 1994'
- 1995 – Kyneton bypass opened to traffic in April 1995, at a cost of A$31m.
- 1996 – Gap Hill section (Diggers Rest to Millett Road). Opened in May 1996, at a cost of A$32m.
- 1998 – Gisborne South to Gisborne. 6 km completed at a cost of A$31 and opened to traffic on 3 April 1998.
- 2000 – Gisborne to Woodend (Black Forest section). 6.8 km section opened to traffic on 17 March 2000. Completed at a cost of A$51m.
- 2001 – Woodend bypass. 13.5 km bypass opened to traffic on 19 December 2001. The total cost of the project was A$85m.
- 2003 – Carlsruhe section. 6.5 km section opened to traffic on 16 April 2003, at a cost of A$46m. This section completed the dual carriageways from Keilor to Kyneton.
- 2005 – 2.5 km north of Kyneton completed in January 2005.
- 2005 – Ravenswood. 6.5 km duplication south of Ravenswood completed in May 2005
- 2008 – 15 km Malmsbury section opened in April 2008.
- 2009 – Harcourt North to Elphinstone opened on 20 April 2009. This 19 km section cost A$404m and completed the duplication of the highway between Melbourne and Bendigo. The project was jointly funded by the state and federal governments.
- 2012 – Kings Road interchange, opened in January 2012, at a cost of $62 million, jointly funded by state and federal governments.
- 2018 – Ravenswood (Calder Highway, Calder Freeway and Calder Alternative Highway) interchange, reconstruction started May 2016 and completed in March 2018, at a cost of $86 million, jointly funded by state and federal governments.

=== 1969 Melbourne Transportation Plan ===
The Calder Highway between the Melton Highway and the Western Ring Road is shown in the 1969 Melbourne Transportation Plan as part of the F4 Freeway corridor, which extends past the Tullamarine Freeway and Bell Street to Templestowe.

== Upgrades ==
=== Western Ring Road to Kings Road ===
In 2008, VicRoads completed the widening of the Calder Freeway from the Western Ring Road to Melton Highway. The road was widened from 2 lanes each direction to 3 lanes in each direction. The speed limit was reduced permanently from 100 km/h to 80 km/h. The 80 km/h limit applies northbound from Keilor Park Drive to Melton Highway, and southbound it applies from the Green Gully Road bridge to just prior to the Western Ring Road interchange. In October 2010, it was announced that as part of a year long trial, the speed limit on this section of freeway will be increased back to 100 km/h in off-peak times (8pm-5am), with 30 variable speed limits to be installed along the stretch of freeway. A further upgrade completed in 2012 resulted in a new interchange at Kings Road (the freeways's urban / metropolitan limits) and closure of three at grade intersections in the area. Despite these upgrades the 80 km/h speed limit remained in place.

== Gallery ==
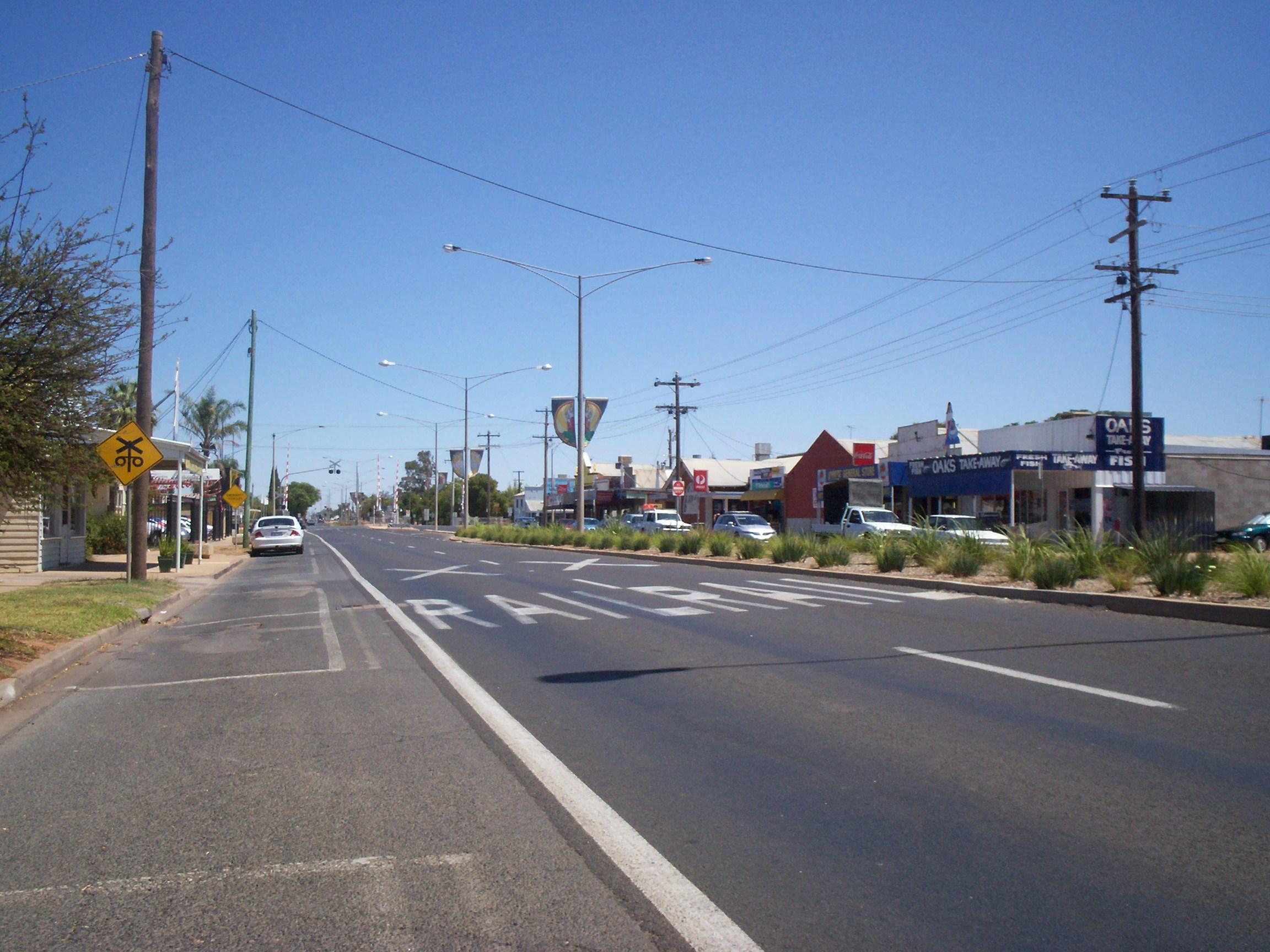
Calder Highway, passing through Irymple.

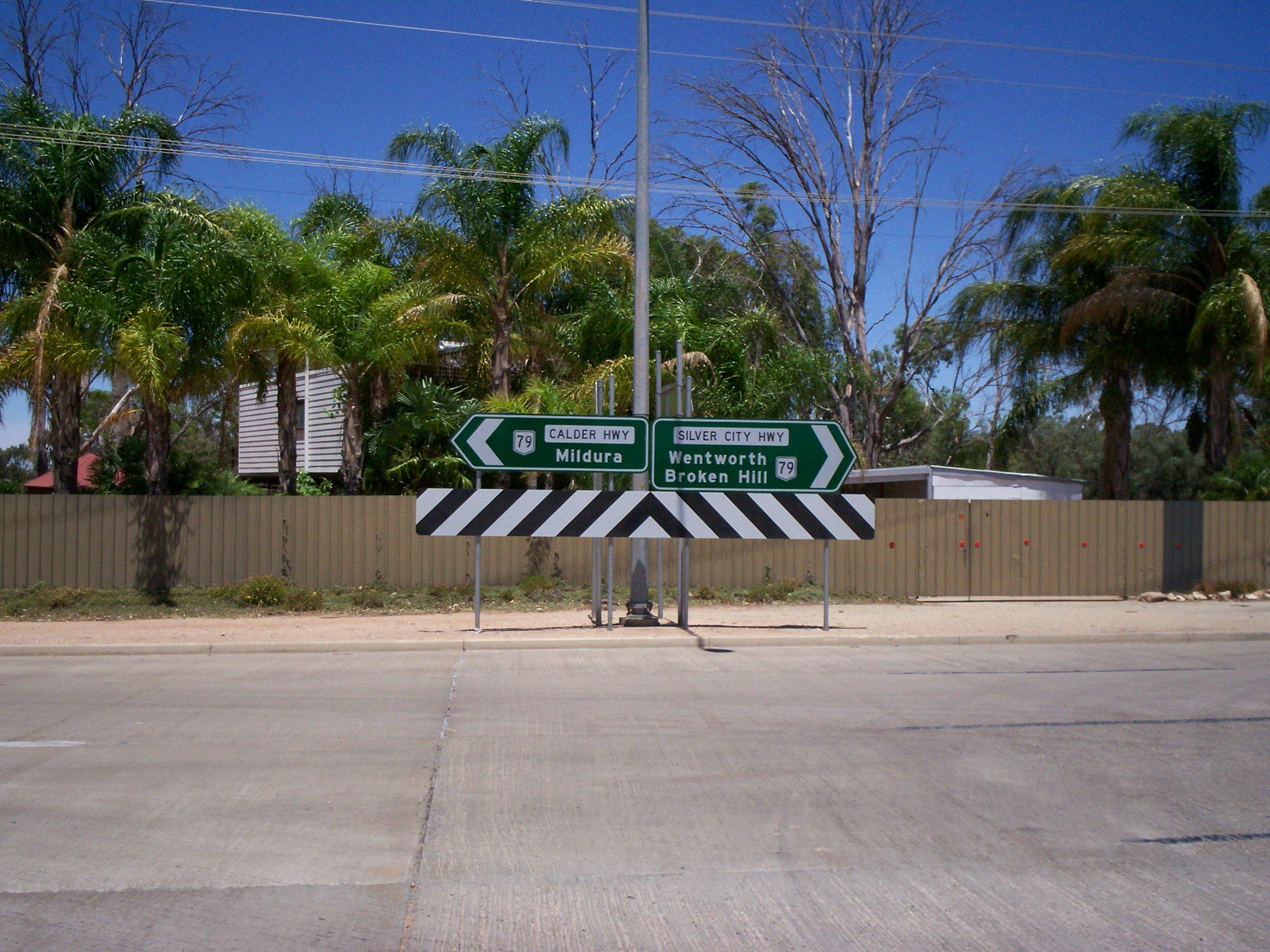
The end of Calder Highway at the intersection of Silver City Highway, in Curlwaa, New South Wales.

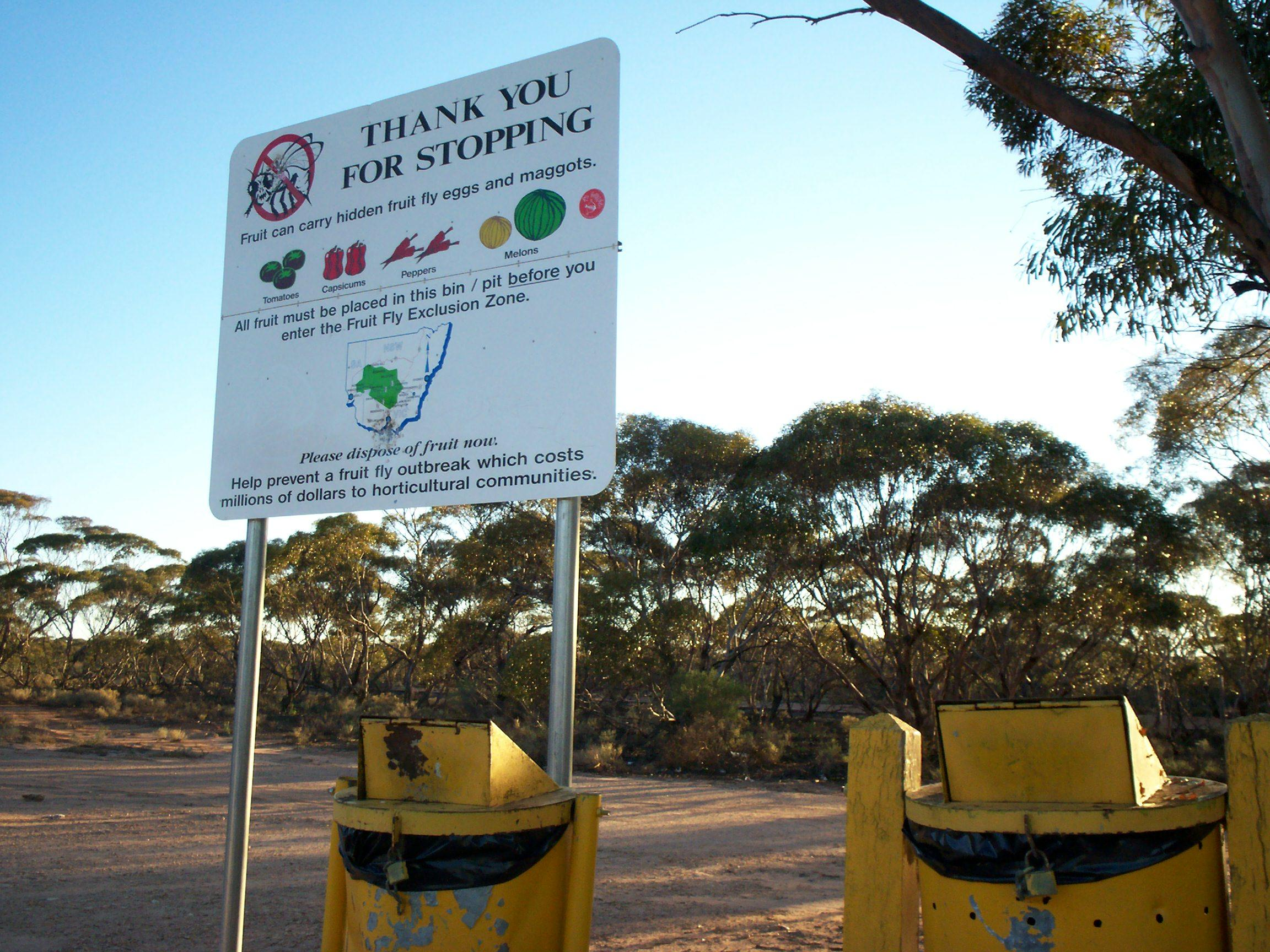
Fruit disposal bins and warning signs along Calder Highway, approaching the Fruit Fly Exclusion Zone near Mildura.

== Major intersections and towns ==
State	LGA	Location	km	mi	Destinations	Notes
New South Wales	Wentworth	Curlwaa	0.0	0.0	Silver City Highway (B79) – Buronga, Wentworth, Broken Hill	Northern terminus of highway
New South Wales	Murray River		0.4– 0.6	0.25– 0.37	Abbotsford Bridge	
State border			0.6	0.37	New South Wales – Victoria state border	
Victoria	Mildura	Yelta	0.6	0.37	Calder Highway	Northern terminus of route A79
Victoria	Mildura	Merbein	11.3	7.0	Ranfurly Way (C256) – Mildura	
Victoria	Mildura	Mildura	21.1	13.1	Sturt Highway (A20 west) – Renmark, Adelaide	Concurrency with route A20
Victoria	Mildura	Mildura	23.8	14.8	Sturt Highway (A20 east) – Mildura, Balranald, Sydney	Concurrency with route A20
Victoria	Mildura	Mildura	25.9	16.1	Benetook Avenue (C255) – Buronga	
Victoria	Mildura	Red Cliffs	38.9	24.2	Millewa Road (C254) – Werrimull, Meringur	
Victoria	Mildura	Red Cliffs	40.1	24.9	Kulkyne Way (C253) – Colignan	
Victoria	Mildura	Hattah	89.3	55.5	Hattah–Robinvale Road (C252) – Robinvale	
Victoria	Mildura	Ouyen	123.9	77.0	Mallee Highway (B12 east) – Piangil, Swan Hill, Balranald, Sydney	Concurrency with route B12
Victoria	Mildura	Ouyen	124.0	77.1	Mallee Highway (B12 west) – Pinnaroo, Murray Bridge, Adelaide	Concurrency with route B12
Victoria	Mildura	Ouyen	134.7	83.7	Sunraysia Highway (B220) – Birchip, Horsham, St Arnaud, Ballarat	
Victoria	Buloke	Bimbourie	194.0	120.5	Patchewollock–Sea Lake Road (C248) – Patchewollock	
Victoria	Buloke	Sea Lake	209.1	129.9	Robinvale–Sea Lake Road (C251) – Robinvale	
Victoria	Buloke	Sea Lake	212.4	132.0	Sea Lake–Swan Hill Road (C246 east) – Swan Hill	Concurrency with route C246
Victoria	Buloke	Sea Lake	212.8	132.2	Birchip–Sea Lake Road (C246 west) – Woomelang, Birchip	Concurrency with route C246
Victoria	Buloke	Dumosa	273.7	170.1	Donald–Swan Hill Road (C261) – Swan Hill, Donald	
Victoria	Buloke	Wycheproof	288.0	179.0	Birchip–Wycheproof Road (C268) – Birchip	
Victoria	Buloke	Wycheproof	289.2	179.7	Boort–Wycheproof Road (C267) – Boort	
Victoria	Buloke	Wycheproof South	295.0	183.3	St Arnaud–Wycheproof Road (C271) – St Arnaud	
Victoria	Buloke	Charlton	318.3	197.8	Borung Highway (C239) – Donald	
Victoria	Buloke	Charlton	318.8	198.1	Charlton–St Arnaud Road (C272) – St Arnaud	
Victoria	Buloke	Charlton	320.1	198.9	Boort–Charlton Road (C266) – Boort, Kerang	
Victoria	Loddon	Wedderburn	350.4	217.7	Boort–Wedderburn Road (C273 north) – Boort, Kerang	Concurrency with route C273
Victoria	Loddon	Wedderburn	350.6	217.9	Logan–Wedderburn Road (C273 south) – Logan, St Arnaud	Concurrency with route C273
Victoria	Loddon	Bridgewater	386.1	239.9	Bridgewater–Dunolly Road (C274 south) – Dunolly, Maryborough; Bridgewater–Serpentine Road (C274 north) – Serpentine, Kerang	
Victoria	Loddon	Bridgewater	387.0	240.5	Bridgewater–Maldon Road (C282) – Maldon, Castlemaine	
Victoria	Greater Bendigo	Marong	409.7	254.6	Calder Alternative Highway (A790) – Ravenswood, to Wimmera Highway – St Arnaud, Horsham	
Victoria	Greater Bendigo	Golden Square	420.6	261.3	Golden Square–Long Gully Road (C323) – Golden Square, Long Gully	
Victoria	Greater Bendigo	Ironbark	422.4	262.5	Loddon Valley Highway (B260) – Eaglehawk, Kerang	
Victoria	Greater Bendigo	Ironbark	422.7	262.7	Eaglehawk Road – White Hills, Echuca, Shepparton	
Victoria	Greater Bendigo	Bendigo	423.6	263.2	Don Street (A79 north) – Marong; High Street (A79/A300 west, A300 east) – Bendigo city centre Myrtle Street (C331 south) – Quarry Hill, Flora Hill	Calder Highway continues north along Don Street, west along High Street; Northern terminus of concurrency with route A300
Victoria	Greater Bendigo	Golden Square	426.2	264.8	Oak Street (C323 north, C353 south) – Long Gully, Quarry Hill	
Victoria	Greater Bendigo	Kangaroo Flat	428.2	266.1	Bendigo–Maryborough Road (C277) – Maryborough	
Victoria	Greater Bendigo	Ravenswood	438.7	272.6	Calder Alternative Highway (A790 northwest) – Marong, Mildura	Southern terminus of Calder Highway and route A79; Northern terminus of Calder Freeway and route M79
Victoria	Mount Alexander	Ravenswood South–Harcourt North boundary	446.8	277.6	Harmony Way – Harcourt, Elphinstone; Fogartys Gap Road (west) – Maldon	At-grade intersection
Victoria	Mount Alexander	Barkers Creek–Harcourt boundary	452.6	281.2	Midland Highway (A300 south-west) – Castlemaine, Ballarat; Victoria Road (north-east) – Harcourt	Southern terminus of concurrency with route A300
Victoria	Mount Alexander	Elphinstone	465.1	289.0	Pyrenees Highway (B180) – Castlemaine, Metcalfe	
Victoria	Macedon Ranges	Malmsbury	479.8	298.1	Old Calder Highway (C794) – Malmsbury, Taradale, Elphinstone; Malmsbury East Road (east) – Greenhill	
Victoria	Macedon Ranges	Kyneton	483.0	300.1	Burton Avenue (C793) – Kyneton	At-grade intersection
Victoria	Macedon Ranges	Kyneton	489.1	303.9	Edgecombe Road (C326 north) – Kyneton, Heathcote	
Victoria	Macedon Ranges	Kyneton	491.1	305.2	Bourke Street (C793 west) – Kyneton; Trio Road (east) – Carlsruhe	Northbound exit and southbound entrance only
Victoria	Macedon Ranges	Carlsruhe	496.2	308.3	Springvale Road – Carlsruhe	
Victoria	Macedon Ranges	Woodend North	499.8	310.6	Macedon–Woodend Road (C792) – Woodend	Southbound exit and northbound entrance only
Victoria	Macedon Ranges	Woodend	504.6	313.5	Lancefield–Woodend Road (C324) – Lancefield, Woodend	
Victoria	Macedon Ranges	Macedon	511.9	318.1	Macedon–Woodend Road (C792) – Macedon, Woodend	
Victoria	Macedon Ranges	Macedon	518.0	321.9	Mount Macedon Road (C322 northeast) – Mount Macedon; Macedon–Woodend Road (C792 northwest) – Macedon	Northbound exit and southbound entrance only
Victoria	Macedon Ranges	Gisborne–New Gisborne boundary	520.1	323.2	Station Road (C708 north, C791 south) – Riddells Creek, Melton	
Victoria	Macedon Ranges	Gisborne	522.9	324.9	Melbourne Road (C791 west) – Gisborne; Emmeline Drive (east) – Gisborne East	
Victoria	Macedon Ranges–Hume boundary	Gisborne South–Sunbury boundary	528.9	328.6	Couangalt Road (west) – Gisborne South; Mundy Road (east) – Sunbury	
Victoria	Hume–Melton boundary	Sunbury–Diggers Rest boundary	533.9	331.8	Gap Road (C707) – Sunbury	
Victoria	Hume–Melton boundary	Sunbury–Diggers Rest boundary	538.9	334.9	Vineyard Road (C706) – Sunbury, Diggers Rest	
Victoria	Hume–Melton boundary	Diggers Rest	542.1	336.8	Bulla–Diggers Rest Road – Bulla, Diggers Rest	
Victoria	Brimbank	Calder Park–Keilor North boundary	545.4– 546.3	338.9– 339.5	Holden Road (west) – Toolern Vale	Northbound exit and entrance only Northbound and southbound access to service centres
Victoria	Brimbank	Calder Park–Keilor North boundary	547.3	340.1	Organ Pipes Road – Organ Pipes National Park	At-grade intersection; intersection to be eliminated and combined with Calder Park Drive interchange
Victoria	Brimbank	Calder Park–Keilor North boundary	548.1	340.6	Calder Park Drive – Calder Park	Northbound exit and entrance only; future full interchange
Victoria	Brimbank	Keilor North–Taylors Lakes boundary	549.9	341.7	Kings Road (Metro Route 77) – Taylors Lakes, Deer Park, Laverton	
Victoria	Brimbank	Keilor North–Keilor Lodge boundary	551.7	342.8	Sunshine Avenue (Metro Route 41) – Taylors Lakes	Northbound exit and entrance only
Victoria	Brimbank	Keilor	552.8	343.5	Melton Highway (C754) – Taylors Lakes, Melton	Partial Y interchange: northbound exit and southbound entrance only
Victoria	Brimbank	Keilor	554.7	344.7	Green Gully Road (Metro Route 40 south) – Keilor, St Albans; Arundel Road (north) – Tullamarine	Northbound exit and southbound entrance only
Victoria	Brimbank	Keilor Park–Keilor East boundary	557.0	346.1	Keilor Park Drive (Metro Route 39) – Keilor Park, Avondale Heights, to Western Ring Road (M80) – Laverton North, Werribee, Avalon Airport	No northbound exit
Victoria	Brimbank	Keilor Park–Keilor East boundary	558.0	346.7	Western Ring Road (M80) – Craigieburn, Seymour, Melbourne Airport	Partial turbine interchange Northbound exit to Western Ring Road southbound, northbound entrance from Western Ring Road southbound only Southbound exit to Western Ring Road northbound, southbound entrance from Western Ring Road northbound Access from northbound exit to Keilor Park Drive
Victoria	Moonee Valley	Keilor East–Airport West boundary	558.8	347.2	Woorite Place – Keilor East, Airport West	Northbound exit and southbound entrance only
Victoria	Moonee Valley	Airport West–Niddrie boundary	559.8	347.8	Fullarton Road (south) – Niddrie; McNamara Avenue – Airport West	Southbound entrance and exit only
Victoria	Moonee Valley	Airport West–Niddrie boundary	560.1	348.0	Keilor Road – Niddrie	Northbound entrance and exit only
Victoria	Moonee Valley	Airport West–Niddrie boundary	560.5	348.3	Bulla Road (Metro Route 37) – Essendon	
Victoria	Moonee Valley	Airport West–Niddrie–Essendon North tripoint	560.9	348.5	Tullamarine Freeway (M2) – Flemington, Port Melbourne	Southern terminus of freeway and route M79 at partial Y interchange
Concurrency terminus; Incomplete access; Route transition

== See also ==
- Highways in Australia
- Highways in Victoria
- Freeways in Australia
- Freeways in Victoria
- Road transport in Victoria
