= Irishtown, Victoria =

Irishtown Victoria
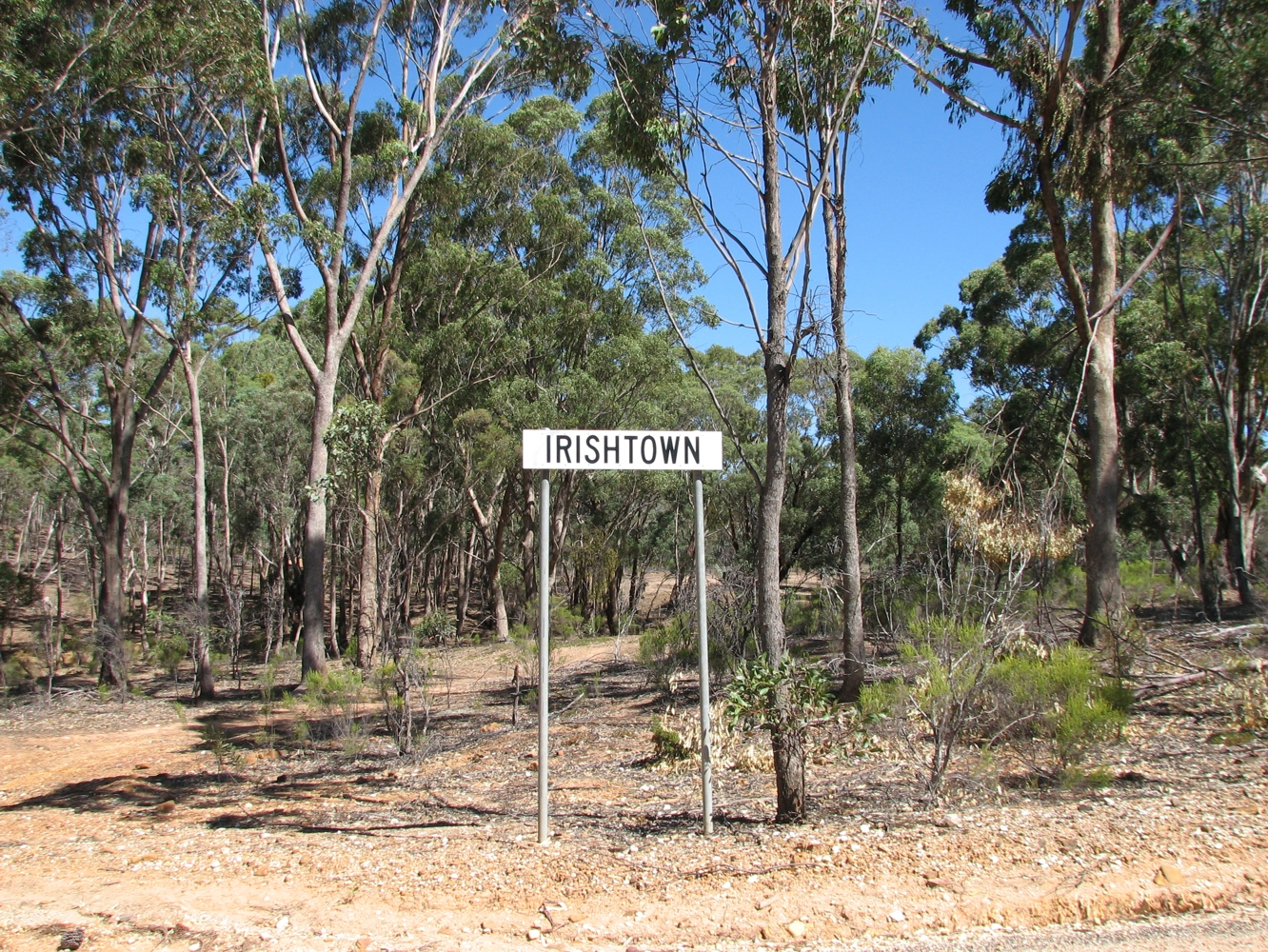

- Coordinates: 37°09′S 144°14′E
- Population: 15 (2016 census)
- Postcode(s): 3451
- Location: 114 km (71 mi) NW of Melbourne; 13 km (8 mi) S of Castlemaine; 51 km (32 mi) S of Bendigo
- LGA(s): Shire of Mount Alexander
- State electorate(s): Macedon
- Federal division(s): Bendigo
Localities around Irishtown:
Yapeen	Fryerstown	Fryerstown
Vaughan	Irishtown	Fryerstown
Vaughan	Glenluce	Glenluce

Irishtown is a locality in Mount Alexander Shire, Victoria, Australia. It is noted for heritage sites associated with the Victorian Gold Rush, near or within the Castlemaine Diggings National Heritage Park. These include the Red Hill hydraulic gold sluicing site and the Burying Flat Cemetery, also known as Deadmans Gully Burial Ground. At the 2016 census, Irishtown had a population of 15.

== History ==
A rush began to New Year's Flat on Fryers Creek on New Year's Day, 1853. The rush was described by a digger as "the most animated sight of those stirring times that I ever witnessed". The settlement arose nearby, and the Shamrock Hotel, an establishment reportedly frequented by "wild men," was subsequently built on the Vaughan Road. A Catholic church was consecrated in 1865, the building existing until 1956 when it was demolished.
