= Alby Pilcher =

Australian rules footballer

Personal information
- Full name: Albert Ambrose Pilcher
- Born: 8 August 1878; Sutton Grange, Victoria
- Died: 11 October 1948 (aged 70); Bendigo, Victoria

Playing career^{1}
Years	Club	Games (Goals)
1903	Melbourne	1 (0)
- ^{1} Playing statistics correct to the end of 1903.

Albert Ambrose Pilcher (8 August 1878 – 11 October 1948) was an Australian rules footballer who played for the Melbourne Football Club in the Victorian Football League (VFL).
