= Shelbourne, Victoria =

Shelbourne
- Town
- Coordinates: 36°49′34″S 144°04′11″E
- Country: Australia
- State: Victoria
- LGAs: City of Greater Bendigo; Shire of Loddon
- Location: 136 km (85 mi) NW of Melbourne; 25 km (16 mi) W of Bendigo; 398 km (247 mi) SE of Mildura

Government
  - State electorate: Bendigo West
  - Federal divisions: Bendigo; Mallee

Population
  - Total: 423 (2021 census)
- Postcode: 3515
Localities around Shelbourne
		Lockwood
Laanecoorie	Shelbourne	Lockwood South
Eastville	Bradford	Ravenswood

Shelbourne is a locality in the Shire of Loddon and City of Greater Bendigo, Victoria, Australia. Murphys creek runs through the southern part of the locality. At the 2021 census, Shelbourne had a population of 423.

== History ==
Shelbourne is named after the Marquess of Lansdowne, who also holds the title of Earl of Shelburne. The town was serviced by Shelbourne railway station until the late 1960s.
