= Moonlight Flat (Shire of Mount Alexander) =

Moonlight Flat Victoria
- Coordinates: 37°3′48″S 144°14′31″E
- Population: 81 (2021 census)
- Postcode(s): 3450
- LGA(s): Shire of Mount Alexander
- State electorate(s): Bendigo West
- Federal division(s): Bendigo

Moonlight Flat is a locality in Shire of Mount Alexander, Victoria, Australia. At the 2021 census, Moonlight Flat had a population of 81.
