= Chewton Bushlands =

Chewton Bushlands Victoria
- Coordinates: 37°04′46″S 144°17′30″E
- Population: 50 (2021 census)
- Postcode(s): 3462
- LGA(s): Shire of Mount Alexander
- State electorate(s): Bendigo West
- Federal division(s): Bendigo

Chewton Bushlands is a locality in the Shire of Mount Alexander, Victoria, Australia. At the 2021 census, Chewton Bushlands had a population of 50.

Chewton Bushlands is the location of a large off-grid community which was established in 1967 when two individuals purchased a block of land in the locality with the aim of creating an alternative lifestyle.
