= Green Gully, Victoria =

Green Gully Victoria
- Coordinates: 37°06′28″S 144°05′50″E
- Population: 71 (2021 census)
- Postcode(s): 3462
- LGA(s): Shire of Mount Alexander
- State electorate(s): Bendigo West
- Federal division(s): Bendigo

Green Gully is a locality in the Shire of Mount Alexander, Victoria, Australia. At the 2021 census, Green Gully had a population of 71.

== History ==
In 1858, Green Gully, then known as Green Valley, experienced a gold rush, attracting approximately 3,000 miners. By the 1860s, quartz mining had also become established in the region. During this period, a Wesleyan church, a school, and a hotel were constructed.
