= Langley, Victoria =

Langley Victoria
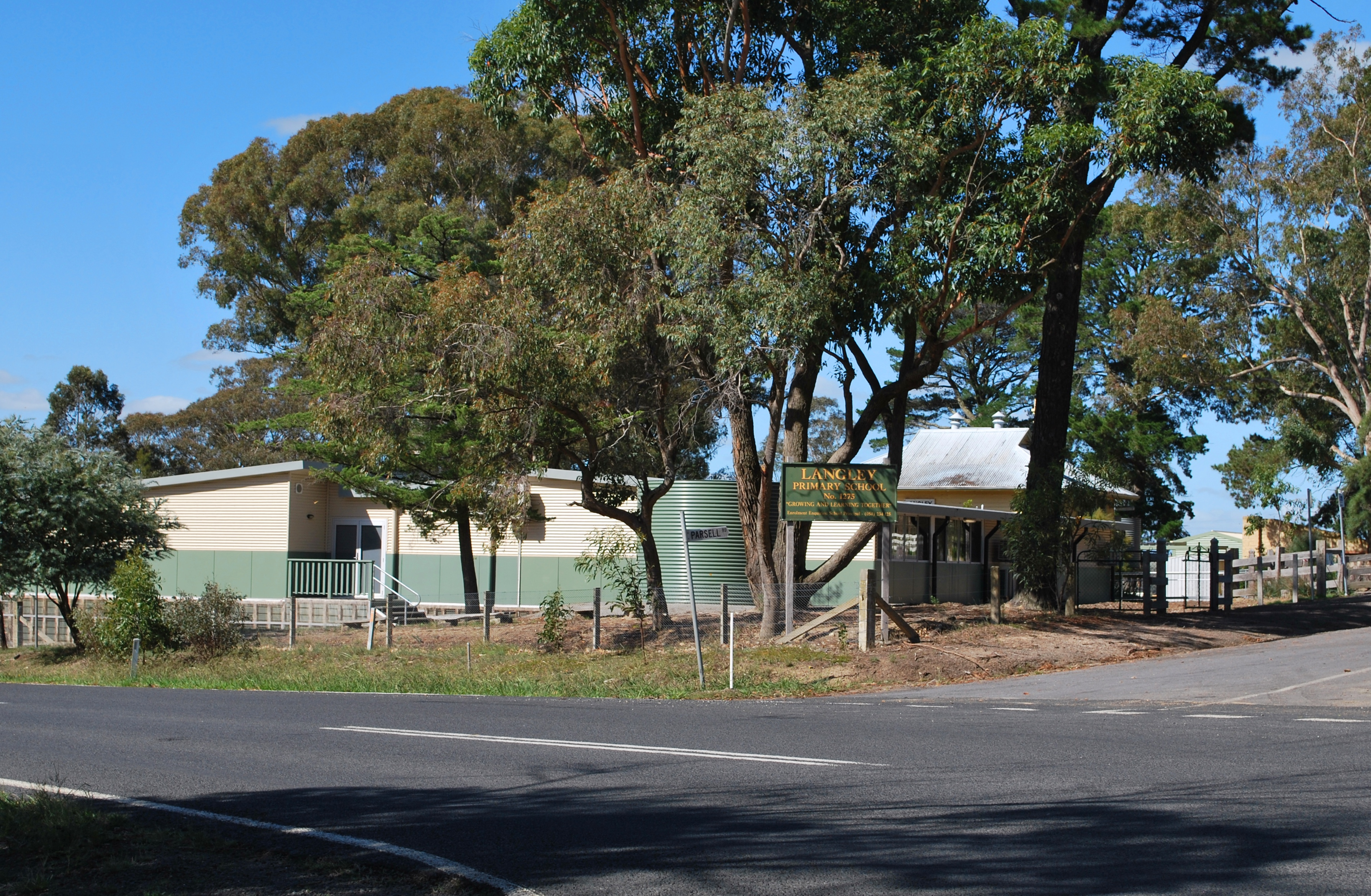
- Langley Primary School, 2012

- Coordinates: 37°10′17″S 144°29′19″E
- Population: 40 (2016 census)
- Postcode(s): 3444
- Location: 96 km (60 mi) N of Melbourne; 64 km (40 mi) E of Bendigo; 61 km (38 mi) S of Bendigo; 9 km (6 mi) N of Kyneton
- LGA(s): Shire of Mount Alexander
- State electorate(s): Macedon
- Federal division(s): Bendigo

Langley is a locality in Mount Alexander Shire, Victoria, Australia. Langley is located 96 kilometres (60 mi) north west of the state capital, Melbourne.

At the 2016 census, Langley had a population of 40.
