= Baringhup West =

Baringhup West Victoria
- Coordinates: 36°57′47″S 143°55′10″E
- Population: 16 (2016 census)
- Postcode(s): 3463
- Elevation: 182 m (597 ft)
- LGA(s): Shire of Mount Alexander
- State electorate(s): Bendigo West
- Federal division(s): Bendigo

Baringhup West is a locality in the Shire of Mount Alexander, Victoria, Australia. At the 2016 census, Baringhup West had a population of 16.
