= Golden Point, Shire of Mount Alexander =

Golden Point Victoria
- Coordinates: 37°03′43″S 144°16′26″E
- Population: 102 (2021 census)
- Postcode(s): 3462
- LGA(s): Shire of Mount Alexander
- State electorate(s): Bendigo West
- Federal division(s): Bendigo

Golden Point is a locality in the Shire of Mount Alexander, Victoria, Australia. At the 2021 census, Golden Point had a population of 102.
