= McKenzie Hill =

- Town
- Coordinates: 37°4′7″S 144°11′22″E
- Country: Australia
- State: Victoria
- LGA: Shire of Mount Alexander

Government
  - State electorate: Bendigo West
  - Federal division: Bendigo

Population
  - Total: 775 (2021 census)
- Postcode: 3451

McKenzie Hill is a suburb of Castlemaine located in the Shire of Mount Alexander, Victoria, Australia. At the 2021 census, McKenzie Hill had a population of 775.
