= Muckleford South =

Muckleford South Victoria
- Coordinates: 37°05′56″S 144°07′48″E
- Population: 33 (2021 census)
- Postcode(s): 3462
- LGA(s): Shire of Mount Alexander
- State electorate(s): Bendigo West
- Federal division(s): Bendigo

Muckleford South is a locality in Mount Alexander Shire, Victoria, Australia. At the 2021 census, Muckleford South had a population of 33.
