= Faraday, Victoria =

Faraday Victoria
- Coordinates: 37°03′S 144°17′E
- Population: 158 (2016 census)
- Postcode(s): 3451
- Location: 116 km (72 mi) NW of Melbourne; 16 km (10 mi) E of Castlemaine; 38 km (24 mi) S of Bendigo
- LGA(s): Shire of Mount Alexander

Faraday is a locality situated on the Calder Highway, 116 kilometres (72 mi) north west of Melbourne in Victoria, Australia.

== History ==
The Post Office opened on 1 April 1867, but was closed in 1880, postal services being provided from nearby Harcourt.

The former Faraday Primary School is a single-room building constructed in 1869 from local granite. It opened as a Common School and became a State School in 1873. In October 1972, six pupils and their teacher were kidnapped from the school and held for a ransom of one million dollars. All later escaped unharmed. The school was closed in 1976, and the building is listed on the Victorian Heritage Register.
