= Gower, Victoria =

Gower Victoria
- Coordinates: 37°02′12″S 144°06′17″E
- Population: 45 (2021 census)
- Postcode(s): 3463
- LGA(s): Shire of Mount Alexander
- State electorate(s): Bendigo West
- Federal division(s): Bendigo

Gower is a locality in the Shire of Mount Alexander, Victoria, Australia. At the 2021 census, Gower had a population of 45.
