= Mount Alexander Shire =

Coordinates: 37°04′00″S 144°13′00″E

Shire of Mount Alexander
- Local government area
- Location in Victoria

- Interactive map of Shire of Mount Alexander
- Country: Australia
- State: Victoria
- Region: Loddon Mallee
- Established: 1995
- Council seat: Castlemaine

Government
  - Mayor: Rosie Annear
  - State electorates: Bendigo West; Macedon
  - Federal division: Bendigo

Area
  - Total: 1,530 km^{2} (590 sq mi)

Population
  - Total: 20,253 (2021)
  - Density: 13.24/km^{2} (34.28/sq mi)
- Gazetted: 19 January 1995
- Website: Shire of Mount Alexander
LGAs around Shire of Mount Alexander
Loddon	Greater Bendigo	Greater Bendigo
Central Goldfields	Shire of Mount Alexander	Mitchell
Hepburn	Hepburn	Macedon Ranges

The Mount Alexander Shire (officially Shire of Mount Alexander) is a local government area in Victoria, Australia, located in the central part of the state. It covers an area of 1,530 square kilometres (590 mi^{2}) and, in August 2021, had a population of 20,253. It includes the of Castlemaine, Chewton, Elphinstone, Maldon, Newstead, Harcourt, Taradale, Fryerstown and Campbells Creek. The traditional owners of the land are the Dja Dja Wurrung.

The Shire is governed and administered by the Mount Alexander Shire Council; its seat of local government and administrative centre is located at the council headquarters in Castlemaine. It also has service centres located in Maldon and Newstead. The Shire is named after Mount Alexander, north-east of Castlemaine, the name of which was historically applied to the broader Castlemaine region and goldfields.

== History ==
An earlier "Shire of Mount Alexander", centred around Guildford, existed from 1871 until 1915, when it was absorbed into the Shire of Newstead.

The modern Shire was formed in 1995 from the amalgamation of the City of Castlemaine, Shire of Newstead, Shire of Metcalfe (less the Redesdale district) and Shire of Maldon (less the area around Eddington township).

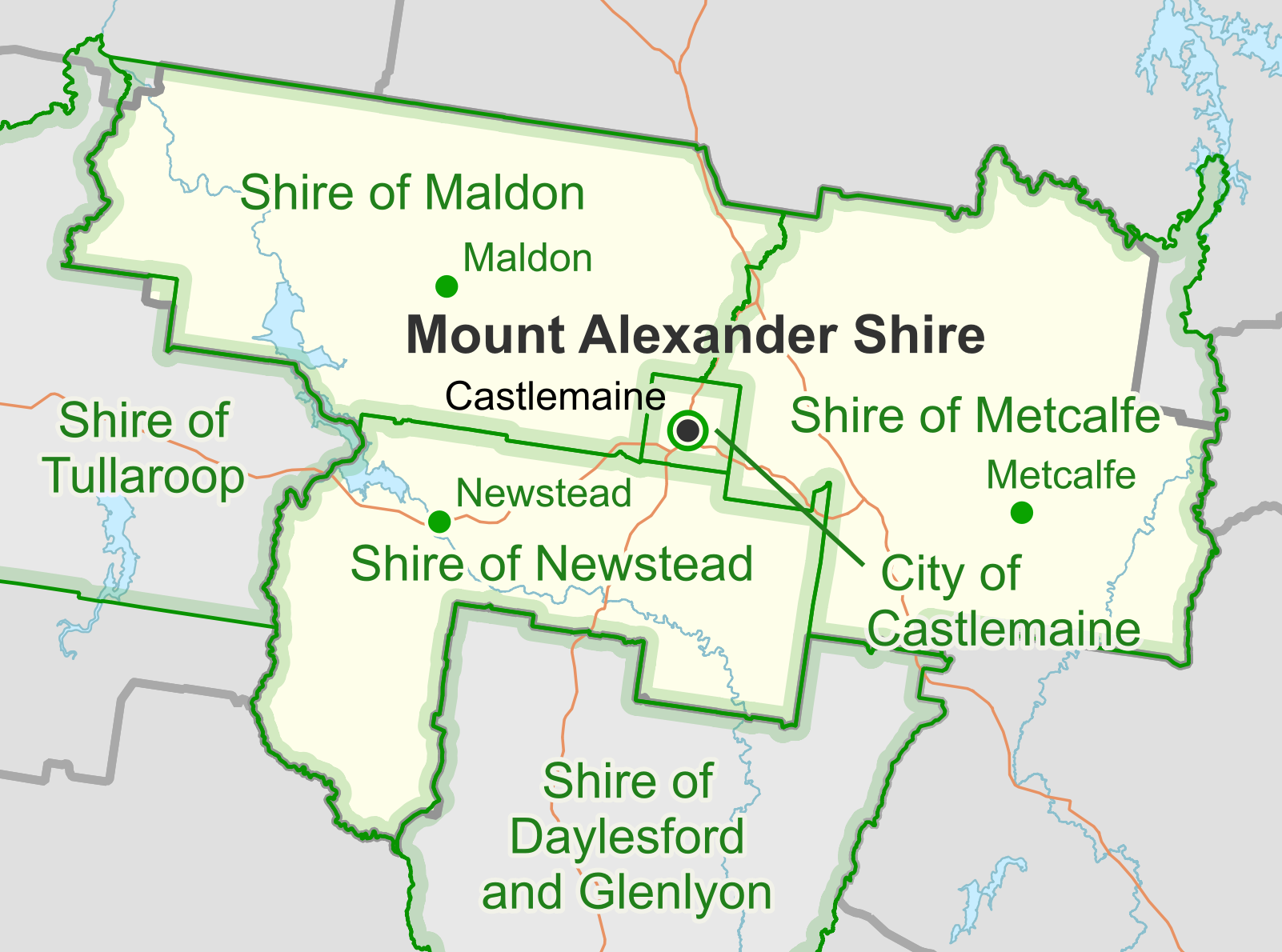
Mount Alexander Shire's predecessor LGAs (green) as they were in 1994. The administrative centres of the former LGAs are marked by green dots.

== Council ==
=== Current composition ===
The council is composed of eight single member-wards.

Ward	Party	Councillor	Notes
Barkers Creek	Independent	Rosie Annear	Mayor
Calder	Independent	Anthony Cordy	
Campbells Creek	Independent	Bill Maltby	
Coliban	Independent	Phillip Walker	
Forest Creek	Independent	Toby Heydon	Deputy Mayor
Loddon River	Independent	Matthew Driscoll	
Moonlight Creek	Greens	Lucas Maddock	
Tarrengower	Independent	Rosalie Hastwell	

=== Administration and governance ===
The council meets in the council chambers at the council headquarters in the Castlemaine Municipal Offices, which is also the location of the council's administrative activities. It also provides customer services at both its administrative centre in Castlemaine, and its service centres in Maldon and Newstead.

== Townships and localities ==
In the 2021 census, the shire had a population of 20,253, up from 18,761 in the 2016 census.

Population
Locality	2016	2021
Barfold	88	82
Baringhup	205	185
Baringhup West	16	11
Barkers Creek	457	487
Bradford	9	12
Campbells Creek	1,786	2,071
Campbelltown^	55	51
Carisbrook^	1,115	1,192
Castlemaine	6,757	7,506
Chewton	1,313	763
Chewton Bushlands	45	50
Drummond North^	187	203
Eastville^	24	13
Eddington^	96	113
Elphinstone	555	633
Faraday	158	194
Franklinford^	66	71
Fryerstown	228	232
Glenluce	20	17
Golden Point	105	102
Gower	45	45
Green Gully	62	71
Greenhill^	54	60
Guildford^	333	330
Harcourt	943	1,038
Harcourt North^	265	291
Irishtown	15	16
Joyces Creek^	12	20
Langley	40	52
Lockwood South^	961	1,052
Maldon	1,513	1,665
Malmsbury^	831	905
McKenzie Hill	502	775
Metcalfe	185	190
Metcalfe East	29	25
Moolort^	32	44
Moonlight Flat	77	85
Muckleford	405	426
Muckleford South	45	33
Myrtle Creek^	67	68
Neereman	24	23
Newstead	754	820
Nuggetty	85	64
Ravenswood^	436	443
Ravenswood South	78	76
Redesdale^	240	299
Sandon	81	89
Shelbourne^	452	423
Strangways^	87	101
Strathlea^	24	33
Sutton Grange	132	160
Taradale^	448	524
Tarilta^	21	26
Tarrengower	64	56
Vaughan	64	55
Walmer	223	262
Welshmans Reef	233	210
Werona^	46	43
Yandoit Hills	28	44
Yapeen	213	272

^ - Territory divided with another LGA

== See also ==
List of localities (Victoria)
