= Moolort =

Moolort Victoria
- Coordinates: 37°05′S 143°56′E
- Population: 44 (2021 census)
  - Density: 0.464/km^{2} (1.201/sq mi)
- Established: 1855
- Postcode(s): 3465
- Elevation: 250 m (820 ft)
- Area: 94.9 km^{2} (36.6 sq mi)
- Time zone: AEST (UTC+10)
  - Summer (DST): AEDT (UTC+11)
- LGA(s): Shire of Central Goldfields; Mount Alexander Shire
- State electorate(s): Ripon
- Federal division(s): Mallee

Moolort is a locality in the Shire of Central Goldfields and the Shire of Mount Alexander, Victoria, Australia. At the 2021 census, Moolort had a population of 44.

== Industry ==
The main industry is currently agriculture with sheep and crop farming being the most prevalent although over the last 15 years some smaller farms have started growing grapes for wine and conifers for Christmas trees. In the past however, Moolort was a large gold mining area which at one point had rivalled other local mining towns in the area for population. There is one mine on the outskirts of Moolort that currently mines vivianite and siderite.

== Goldfields ==
Due to a mistake with calculations, the first shaft of the Moolort mines was sunk approximately 6,000 ft (1,800 m) to the west of the main lead; this meant that the miners had to dig across to the lead while underground after already having dug down to 284 ft (87 m), until a new shaft was sunk. This new shaft was at Keystone and allowed the mines to extract material closer to its source. But the heads of the mining companies did not believe that colonial workmanship was up to the task of constructing the equipment that was needed, especially the water pumps. The pumps were needed to clear water from the mines as a water basin is under a large part of the Moolort plains; at the height of operations the mines were pumping out 20,000,000 gallons (91 megalitres) of water every day. This led them to buy the equipment from London in England as well as from the United States at a price of £500,000 at a time when gold was selling for about £2 per ounce. It was this excessive capitalisation that ultimately led to the downfall of the Moolort mines as even though the mines were quite rich they were never able to pay dividends.

The mines around Moolort were significant because they were the first deep lead mines in the Maldon Mining Division and among the first to use electrical power.

Victorian Colonial Government "Electric Light and Power Act 1896" Report Archives reveal that the Deep Leads Electric Transmission Company was formed and was approved by the Government (under Electric Supply Order-In-Council #14) in 1899, to build and operate a substantial private Electric Supply Undertaking serving the mines of Charlotte Plains, New Havilah, Junction Deep Leads and Victorian Deep Leads in Moolort. The records advise that the main purpose of the electrical undertaking was to operate the pumps to de-water the mining operations and to provide lighting. These records also indicate that this electrical operation ceased in July 1909.

According to Bannear (1993), many of Moolort's mines hold cultural significance due to the difficulties experienced in running deep lead mines as well as the various means used to extract water from the mines to keep them dry and relatively safe.

Most of the gold mines were closed by 1906, with the last of the equipment and property being sold off by 1916. The tailings were sold to the State Rivers Board for use as road base. Between 1905 and 1925 Moolort's population shrank quite quickly. A town that once had twenty-eight pubs and three post offices became little more than a village that could no longer even field a football team. In the next fifty years even the state school, general store and the last post office were closed, with locals having to travel twelve kilometres (7.5 miles) to Carisbrook or sixteen (10 miles) to Newstead for their needs.

== Topography ==
Most of Moolort consists of basaltic soil laid down by the eruption of Bald Hill approximately 10,000 years ago. Most of Moolort consists of low, rolling plains although there are at least three unnamed hills. At the southern end of Moolort Long Swamp is the only major wetlands. Towards the east, the Cairn Curran reservoir was formed between the basalt of Moolort and the granite formations of the Maldon area.

Sheoak Hill or Mt Moolort (difference of opinion on its name) is a volcanic crater, north of the Pyrenees Highway and east of the Baringhup-Moolort Rd., is more probably the source of the basalt of the Moolort Plains. This crater is on private property and can't be seen from the roads, it appears as a small hill or rise from the Highway.

There are approximately 50 wetlands scattered across the plains.
