= Campbelltown, Victoria =

Campbelltown Victoria
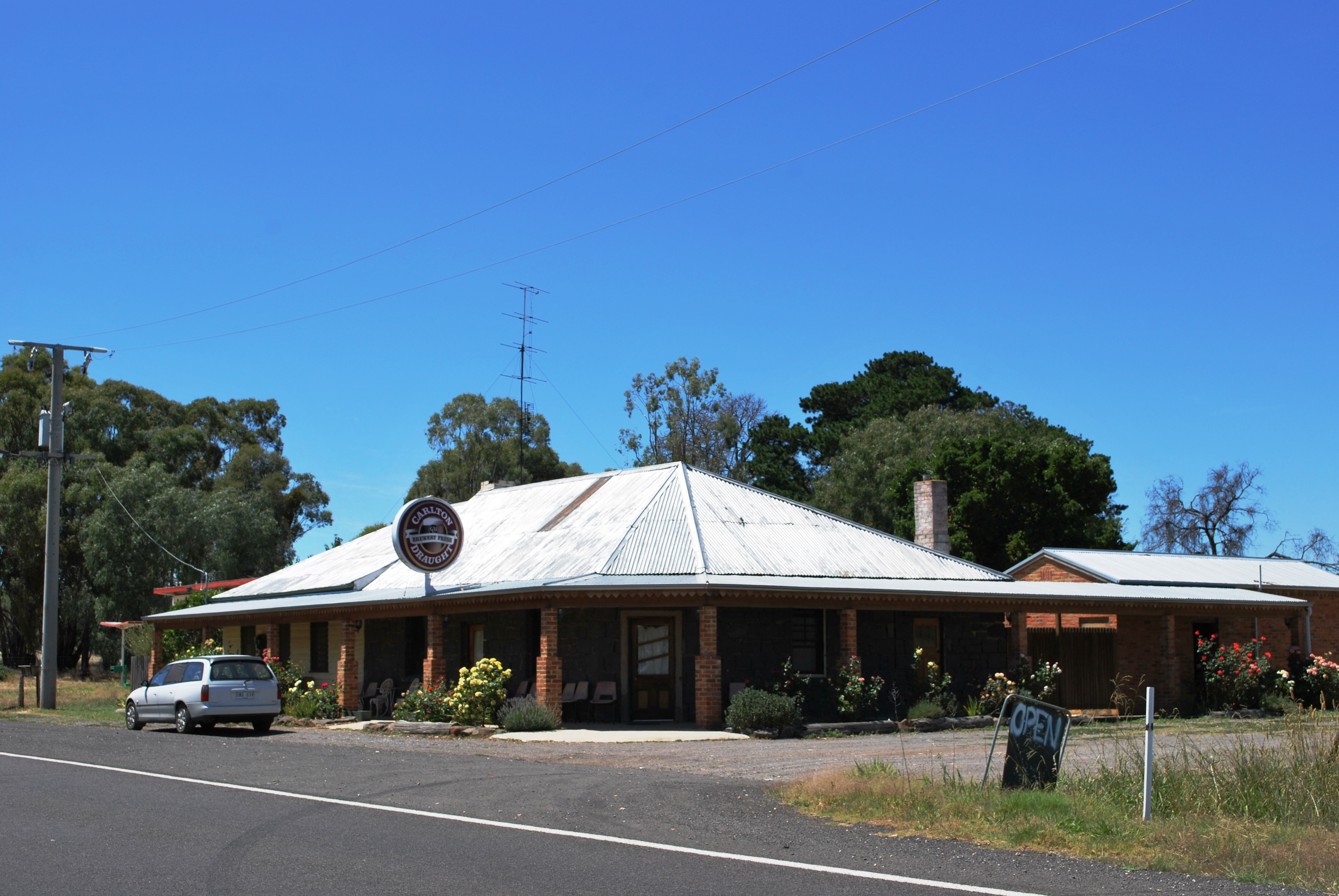
- The Black Duck Hotel at Campbelltown

- Coordinates: 37°11′48″S 143°57′23″E
- Population: 55 (2016 census)
- Postcode(s): 3364
- Location: 140 km (87 mi) NW of Melbourne; 48 km (30 mi) N of Ballarat; 18 km (11 mi) SW of Newstead
- LGA(s): Shire of Hepburn; Shire of Central Goldfields; Shire of Mount Alexander
- State electorate(s): Ripon
- Federal division(s): Ballarat; Bendigo; Mallee

Campbelltown is a locality in central Victoria, Australia. The locality is split among the Shire of Hepburn, the Shire of Central Goldfields and the Shire of Mount Alexander. It lies 140 kilometres (87 mi) northwest of the state capital, Melbourne.

At the 2016 census, Campbelltown had a population of 55.
