= Nuggetty =

Nuggetty Victoria
- Coordinates: 36°56′49″S 144°03′40″E
- Population: 64 (2021 census)
- Postcode(s): 3463
- LGA(s): Shire of Mount Alexander
- State electorate(s): Bendigo West
- Federal division(s): Bendigo

Nuggetty is a locality in Shire of Mount Alexander, Victoria, Australia. At the 2021 census, Nuggetty had a population of 64.
