= Tarrengower =

Tarrengower Victoria
- Coordinates: 37°0′38″S 144°0′51″E
- Population: 56 (2021 census)
- Postcode(s): 3463
- LGA(s): Shire of Mount Alexander
- State electorate(s): Bendigo West
- Federal division(s): Bendigo

Tarrengower is a locality in Shire of Mount Alexander, Victoria, Australia. At the 2021 census, Tarrengower had a population of 56.

The name "Tarrengower" means "The big rough mountain."
