= Fryerstown =

- Town
- Interactive map of Fryerstown
- Coordinates: 37°08′S 144°15′E
- Country: Australia
- State: Victoria
- LGA: Shire of Mount Alexander
- Location: 115 km (71 mi) NW of Melbourne; 47 km (29 mi) S of Bendigo; 10 km (6.2 mi) S of Castlemaine; 40 km (25 mi) N of Daylesford

Government
  - State electorate: Macedon
  - Federal division: Bendigo

Population
  - Total: 232 (SAL 2021)
- Postcode: 3451
Localities around Fryerstown
Campbells Creek	Chewton	Barkers Creek
Muckleford	Fryerstown	Elphinstone
Yandoit	Franklinford	Drummond North

Fryerstown is a town in Mount Alexander Shire, Victoria, Australia.

At the 2016 census, Fryerstown and the surrounding area had a population of 228, which peaked at 15,000 during the Victorian gold rush.

The Post Office opened on 19 April 1854 as Fryer's Creek, was renamed Fryerstown in 1856, and closed in 1975. Fryerstown Court House opened in 1879 and closed in 1930.

Fryerstown formerly had a police station, court, churches, school, hotels and various stores. All are now closed and the nearest general store, church or petrol station is now at Chewton, Campbells Creek or Castlemaine. There is a public hall.

Gardenvale Primary School's school camp used to be located in Fryerstown.
