= Barkers Creek, Victoria =

Barkers Creek Victoria
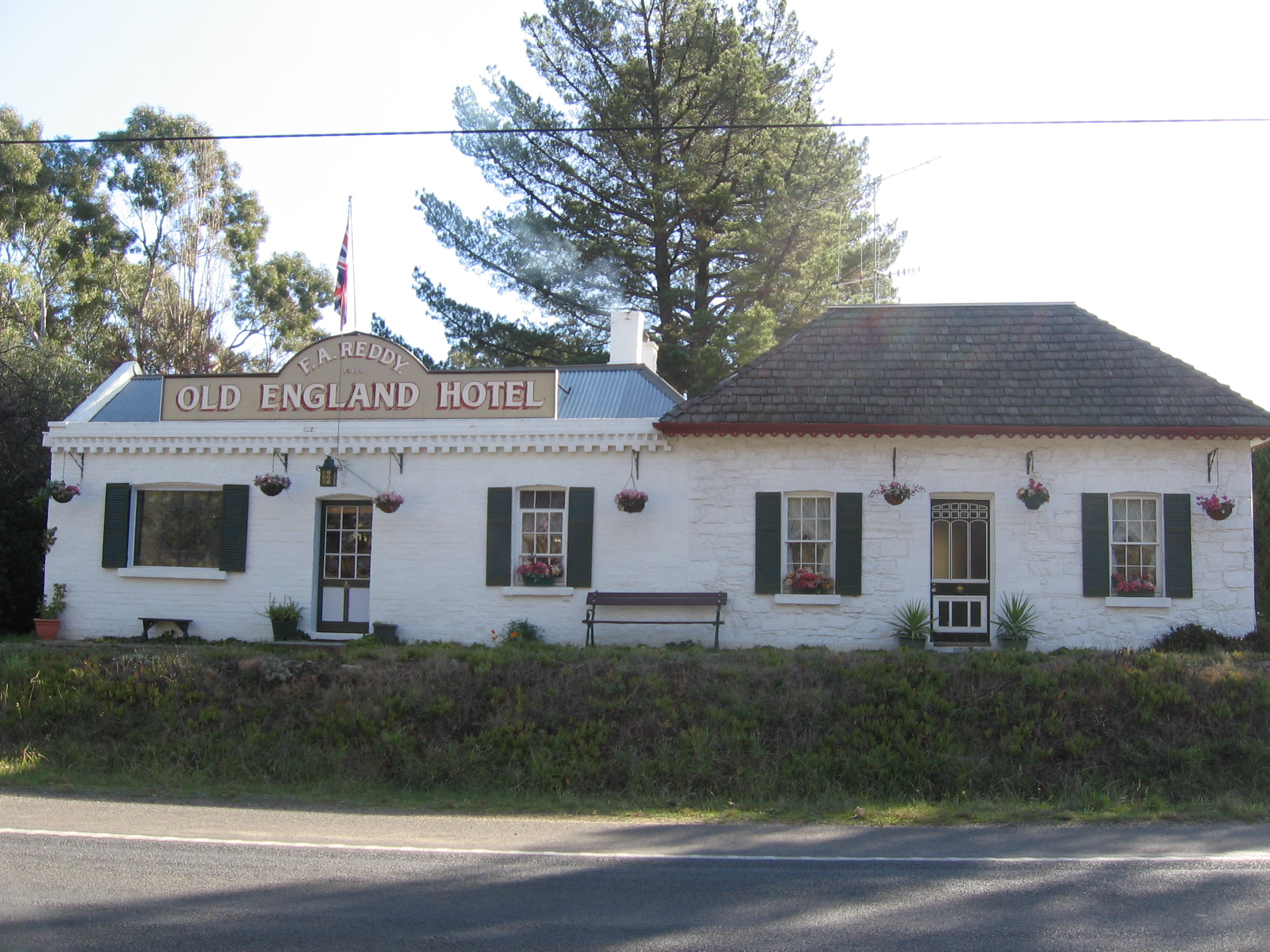
- The Old England Hotel, now a bed and breakfast inn, in Barkers Creek, 2008

- Coordinates: 37°01′30″S 144°14′12″E
- Population: 457 (2016 census)
- Postcode(s): 3451
- Location: 125 km (78 mi) NW of Melbourne; 36 km (22 mi) S of Bendigo; 4 km (2 mi) N of Castlemaine; 3 km (2 mi) N of Harcourt
- LGA(s): Shire of Mount Alexander
- State electorate(s): Bendigo West
- Federal division(s): Bendigo

Barkers Creek is a locality in the Shire of Mount Alexander, Victoria, Australia. It is located 125 kilometres (78 mi) north west of the state capital, Melbourne. At the 2016 census, Barkers Creek had a population of 457.
