= Yapeen =

Yapeen Victoria
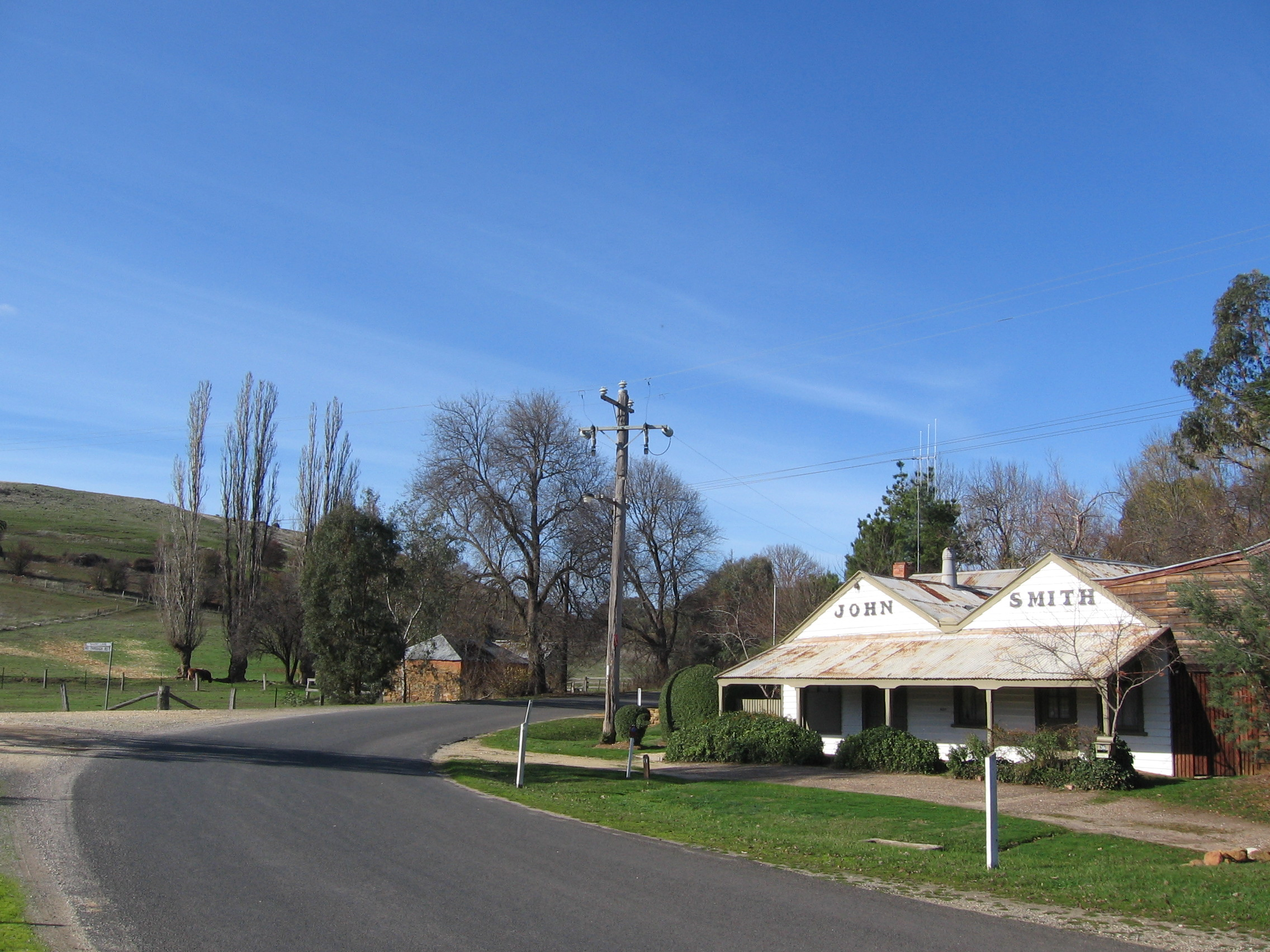
- A building in Yapeen

- Coordinates: 37°7′0″S 144°10′0″E
- Population: 213 (2016 census)
- Postcode(s): 3451
- Location: 131 km (81 mi) NW of Melbourne; 47 km (29 mi) S of Bendigo; 9 km (6 mi) S of Castlemaine
- LGA(s): Shire of Mount Alexander
- State electorate(s): Bendigo West
- Federal division(s): Division of Bendigo

Yapeen is a town in central Victoria, Australia. The locality is in the Shire of Mount Alexander local government area and on the Midland Highway, 131 kilometres (81 mi) north west of the state capital, Melbourne and 9 kilometres (5.6 mi) south of Castlemaine. At the 2021 census, Yapeen had a population of 272.

The locality was originally part of the Strathloddon pastoral run which was held by several notable people including Frederick Taylor. Gold was discovered in the area in 1852 and miners flocked to what was known as the "Pennyweight Flat diggings". The settlement was named "Yapeen" in 1861, for an Aboriginal word meaning "green hill" or "valley". Chinese miners were prominent in the area and some later established market gardens.

A school was first established in Yapeen in 1858 with a dedicated school building constructed in 1877. The school closed in 2010.
