= Eddington, Victoria =

Eddington
- Town
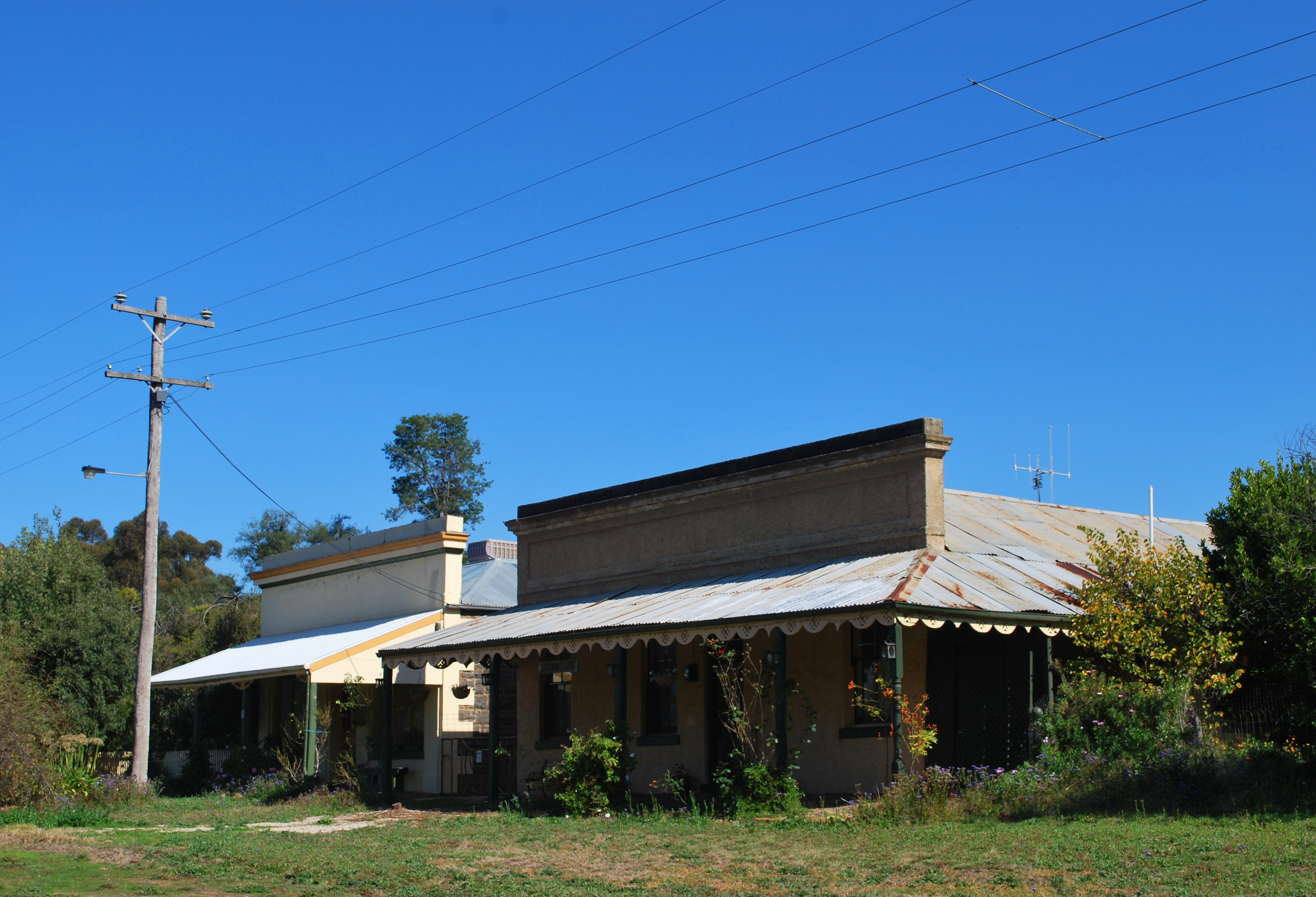
- Buildings in Eddington

- Coordinates: 36°53′22″S 143°51′46″E
- Country: Australia
- State: Victoria
- LGAs: Shire of Loddon; Shire of Mount Alexander
- Location: 130 km (81 mi) NW of Melbourne; 48 km (30 mi) SW of Bendigo; 13 km (8.1 mi) SE of Dunolly

Government
  - State electorate: Ripon
  - Federal divisions: Bendigo; Mallee

Population
  - Total: 113 (2021 census)
- Postcode: 3472

Eddington is a locality in the Shire of Loddon, and Shire of Mount Alexander, Victoria, Australia. It is approximately 130 kilometres (81 mi) north-west from Melbourne. Eddington is located on the Loddon River. At the 2021 census, Eddington had a population of 113.

There is a bridge over the Loddon at Eddington, built during 1928-30 to replace a 19th-century bridge that tended to be swept away by seasonal floods.

During the second half of the 19th century, the town had various facilities, including a brewery, cheese factory, butter factory, several hotels, a racecourse, and churches.

Today there is an active Golf Club, a Community Centre and live steam model engineering society. There are two former hotels, a former general store, former police station and lockup, former primary school and former garage. The Loddon River at Eddington is the upper reach of Laanecoorie Weir.

A cafe operating limited hours also operates out of the old service station premises on the main road.
