= Harcourt North =

Harcourt North Victoria
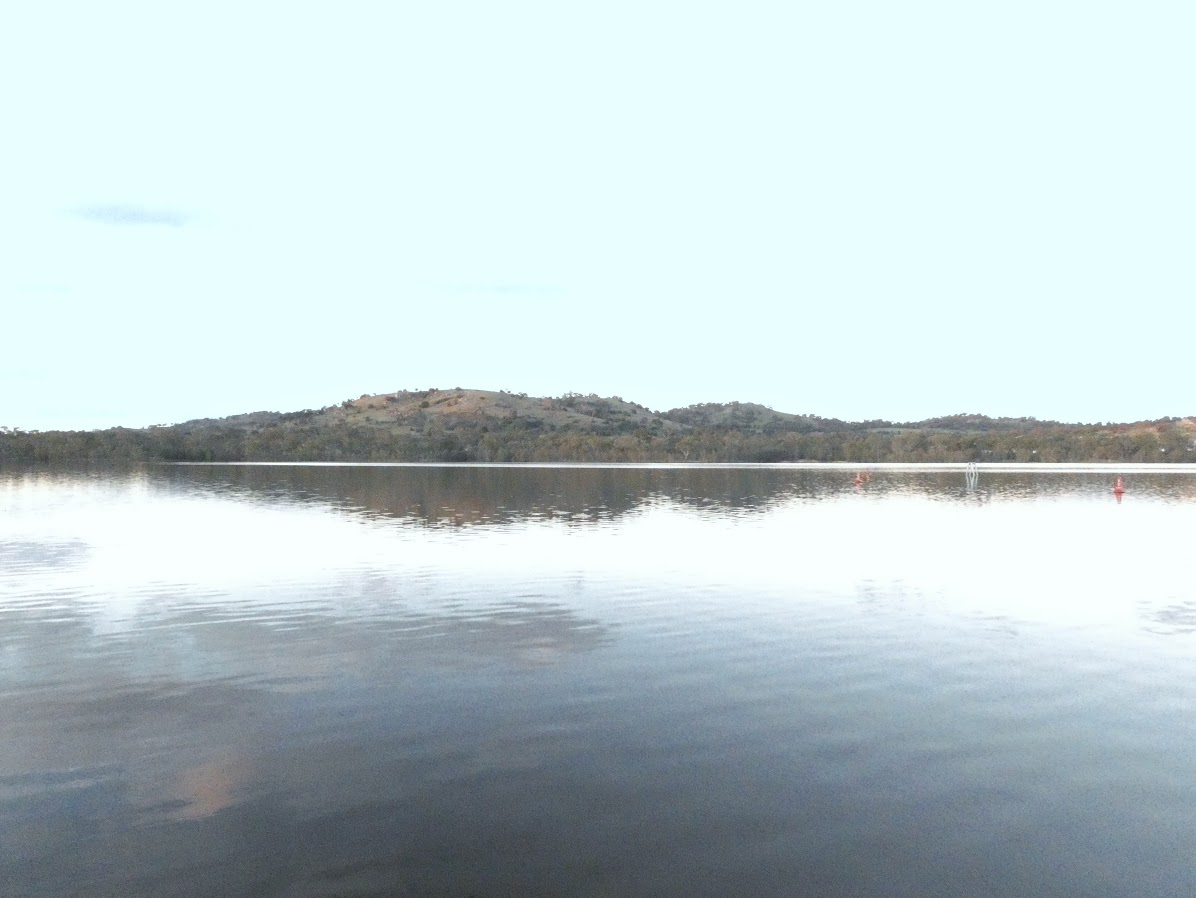
- Barkers Creek Reservoir, Harcourt North

- Coordinates: 36°55′40″S 144°17′2″E
- Population: 291 (2021 census)
- Postcode(s): 3453
- LGA(s): City of Greater Bendigo; Shire of Mount Alexander
- State electorate(s): Bendigo East
- Federal division(s): Bendigo

Harcourt North is a locality in the Shire of Mount Alexander and City of Greater Bendigo, Victoria, Australia. At the 2021 census, Harcourt North had a population of 291.
