= Ravenswood, Victoria =

Ravenswood Bendigo, Victoria
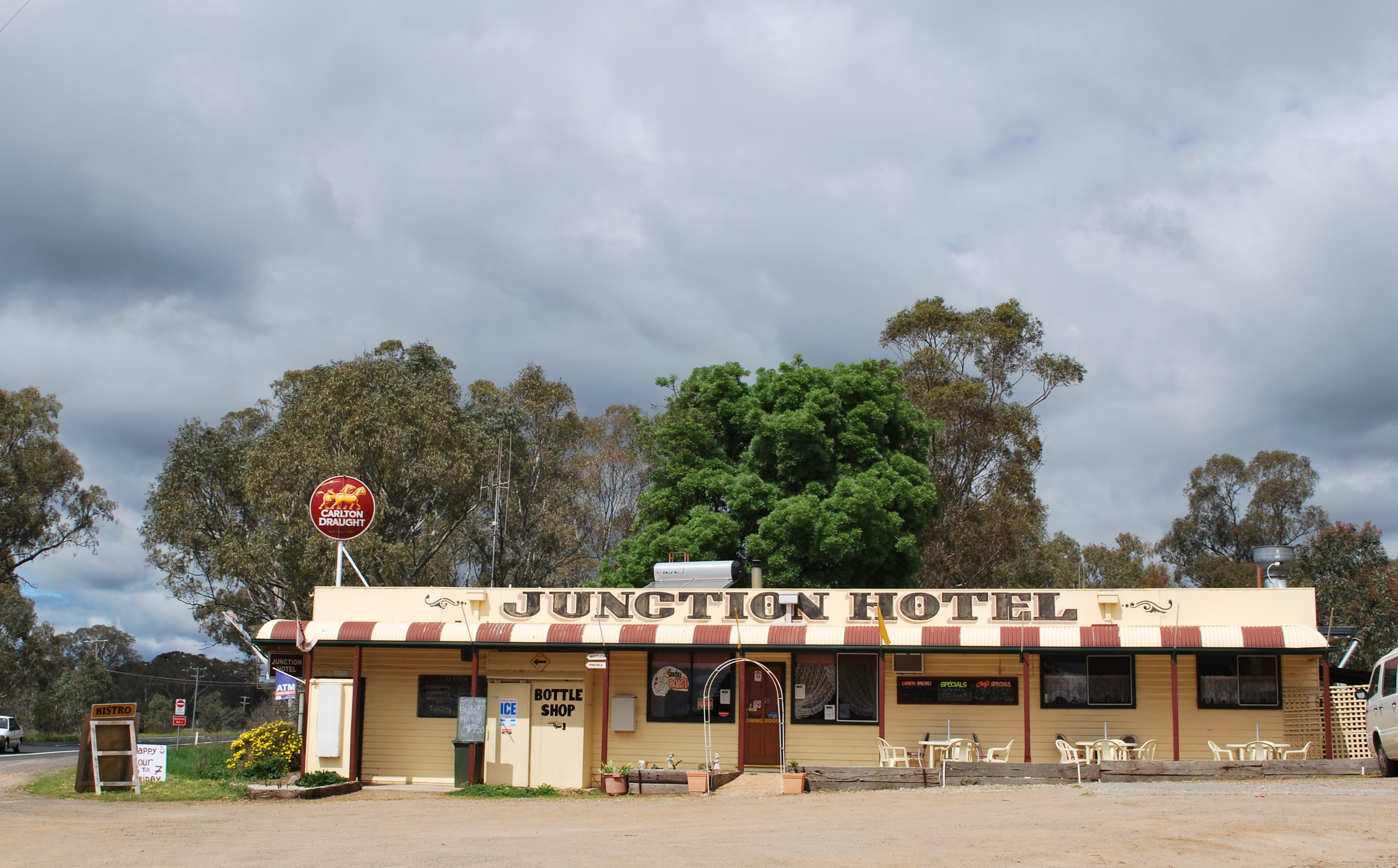
- The former Junction Hotel at Ravenswood, destroyed by fire in 2014

- Coordinates: 36°53′32″S 144°12′56″E
- Population: 436 (2016 census)
- Postcode(s): 3453
- Location: 136 km (85 mi) N of Melbourne; 17 km (11 mi) S of Bendigo; 14 km (9 mi) N of Harcourt
- LGA(s): City of Greater Bendigo; Mount Alexander Shire
- State electorate(s): Bendigo West
- Federal division(s): Bendigo

Ravenswood is a locality in north central Victoria, Australia. The locality is in the City of Greater Bendigo and Mount Alexander Shire local government areas, 136 kilometres (85 mi) north of the state capital, Melbourne.

At the 2016 census, Ravenswood had a population of 436.
