= Baringhup =

- Town
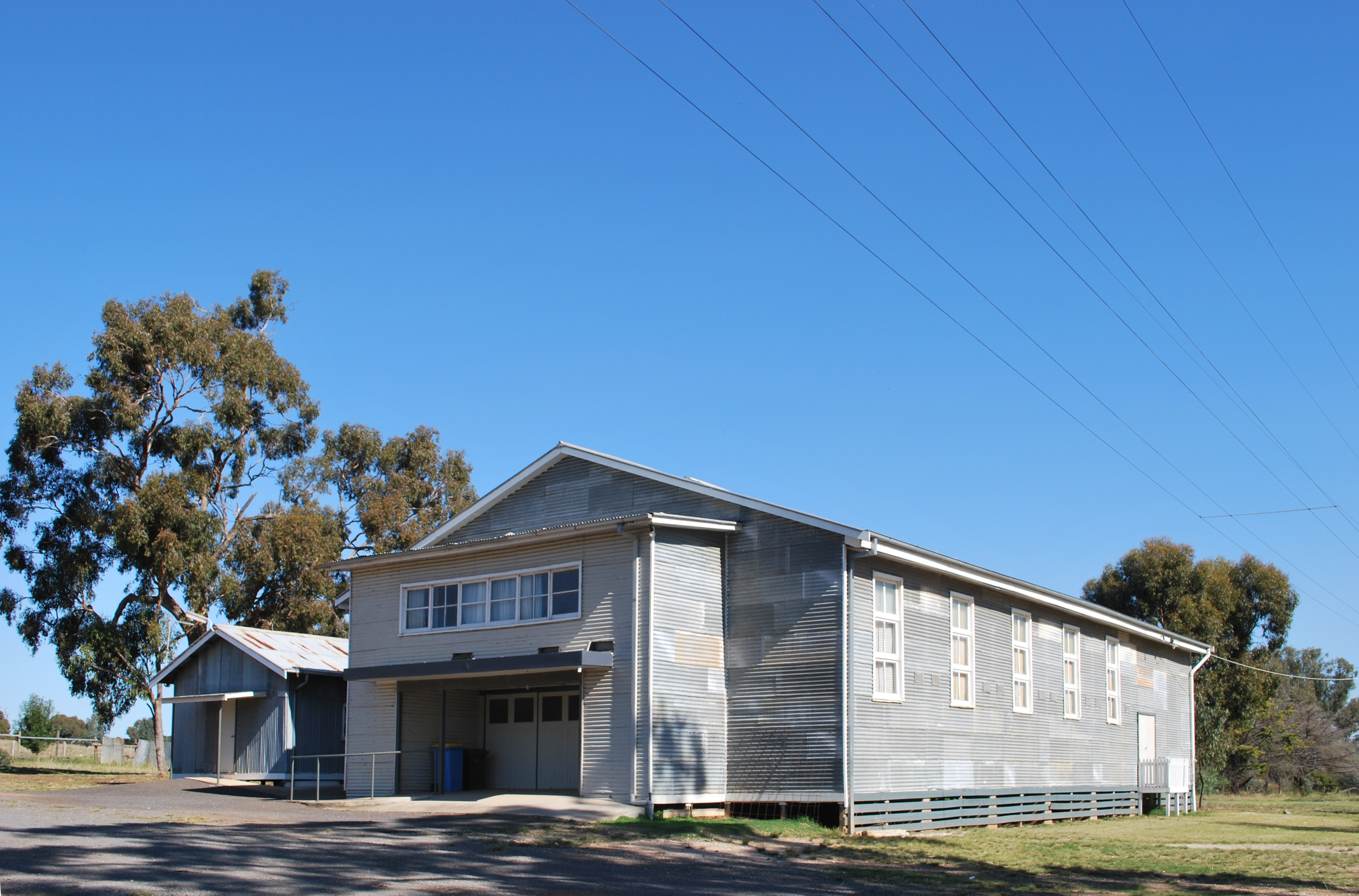
- Baringhup Public Hall, 2011

- Interactive map of Baringhup
- Coordinates: 36°58′59″S 143°58′19″E
- Country: Australia
- State: Victoria
- LGA: Shire of Mount Alexander
- Location: 155 km (96 mi) NW of Melbourne; 47 km (29 mi) SW of Bendigo; 25 km (16 mi) NE of Maryborough; 12 km (7.5 mi) W of Maldon

Government
  - State electorate: Bendigo West
  - Federal division: Bendigo

Population
  - Total: 205 (2016 census)
- Postcode: 3463

Baringhup is a locality in the Shire of Mount Alexander, Victoria, Australia. It is 155 kilometres (96 mi) north-west of the state capital, Melbourne, and about 8 kilometres west of Maldon. It is situated beside the Loddon River and to the south is the Cairn Curran Reservoir.

At the 2016 census, Baringhup had a population of 205.

Baringhup has a public hall and a general store at the caravan park. The primary school closed in 2018.
