= Walmer, Victoria =

Walmer
- Town
- Coordinates: 36°58′3″S 144°9′13″E
- Country: Australia
- State: Victoria
- LGA: Shire of Mount Alexander
- Established: 1859

Government
  - State electorate: Bendigo West
  - Federal division: Bendigo

Population
  - Total: 223 (2016 census)
- Time zone: UTC+10 (AEST)
  - Summer (DST): UTC+11 (AEST)
- Postcode: 3463

Walmer is a locality in the Shire of Mount Alexander, Victoria, Australia.

There is a fire station located in Walmer.
