= Vaughan, Victoria =

Vaughan
- Town
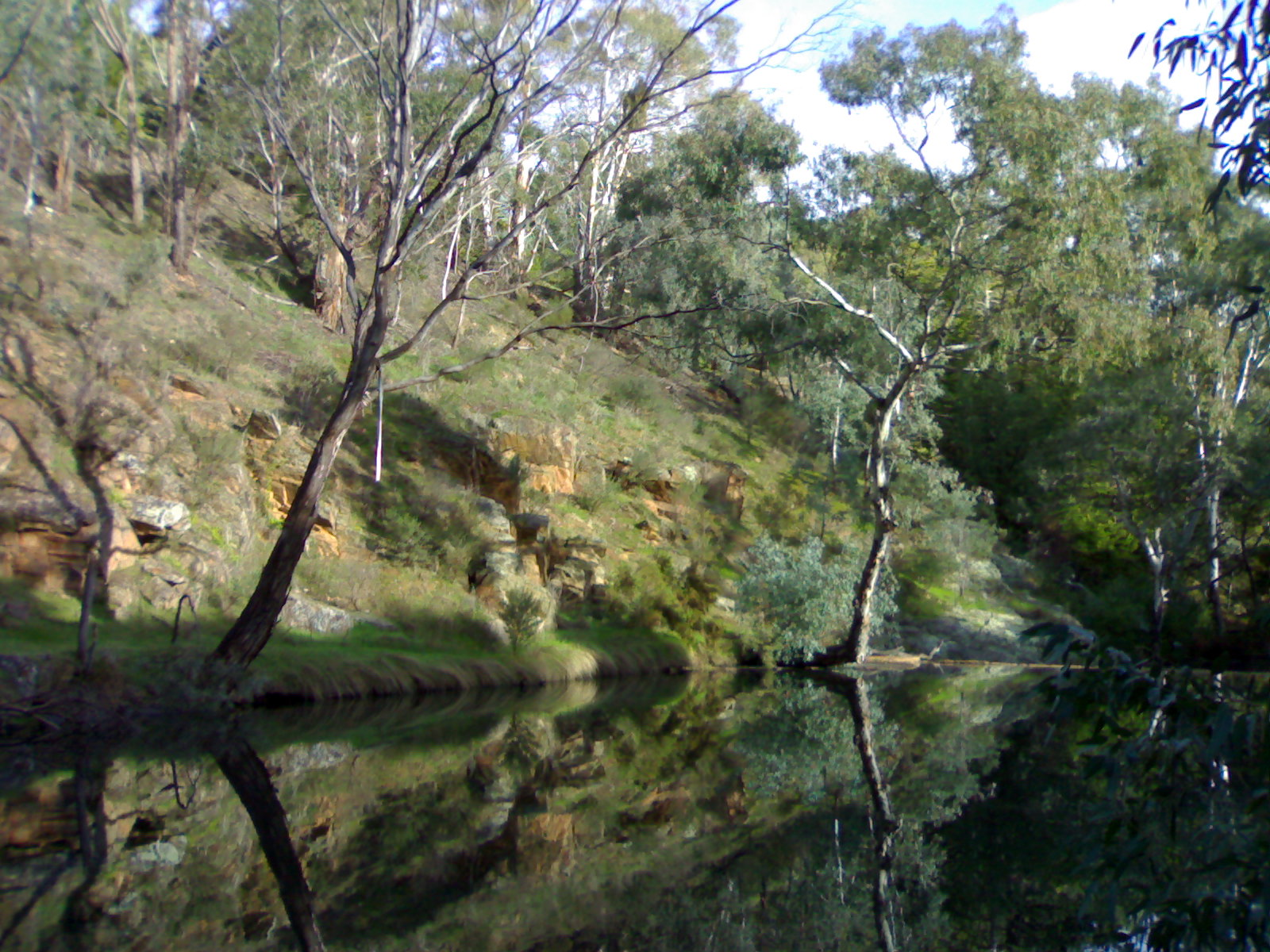
- Loddon River

- Coordinates: 37°09′S 144°13′E
- Country: Australia
- State: Victoria
- LGA: Shire of Mount Alexander
- Location: 117 km (73 mi) NW of Melbourne; 52 km (32 mi) S of Bendigo; 13 km (8.1 mi) S of Castlemaine

Government
  - State electorate: Bendigo West
  - Federal division: Bendigo

Population
  - Total: 64 (2016 census)
- Postcode: 3451

Vaughan is a locality in the Shire of Mount Alexander in the state of Victoria, Australia south of Castlemaine and east of Guildford.

Vaughan is situated at the confluence of Fryer's Creek and the Loddon River which has the Lawson spring, a drinkable mineral water spring. The spring location is sometimes referred to as Vaughan Spring or Vaughan Springs. Vaughan Springs was previously the location of a large gold rush township called The Junction.

The population of Vaughan at the 2016 Census was 64.

Vaughan Post Office first opened on 15 March 1859 and closed in 1922. It opened again in 1947 and closed in 1968. The nearest post office is now at Guildford.

The nearest business is the Guildford general store, and the Guildford Hotel.

== Gallery ==
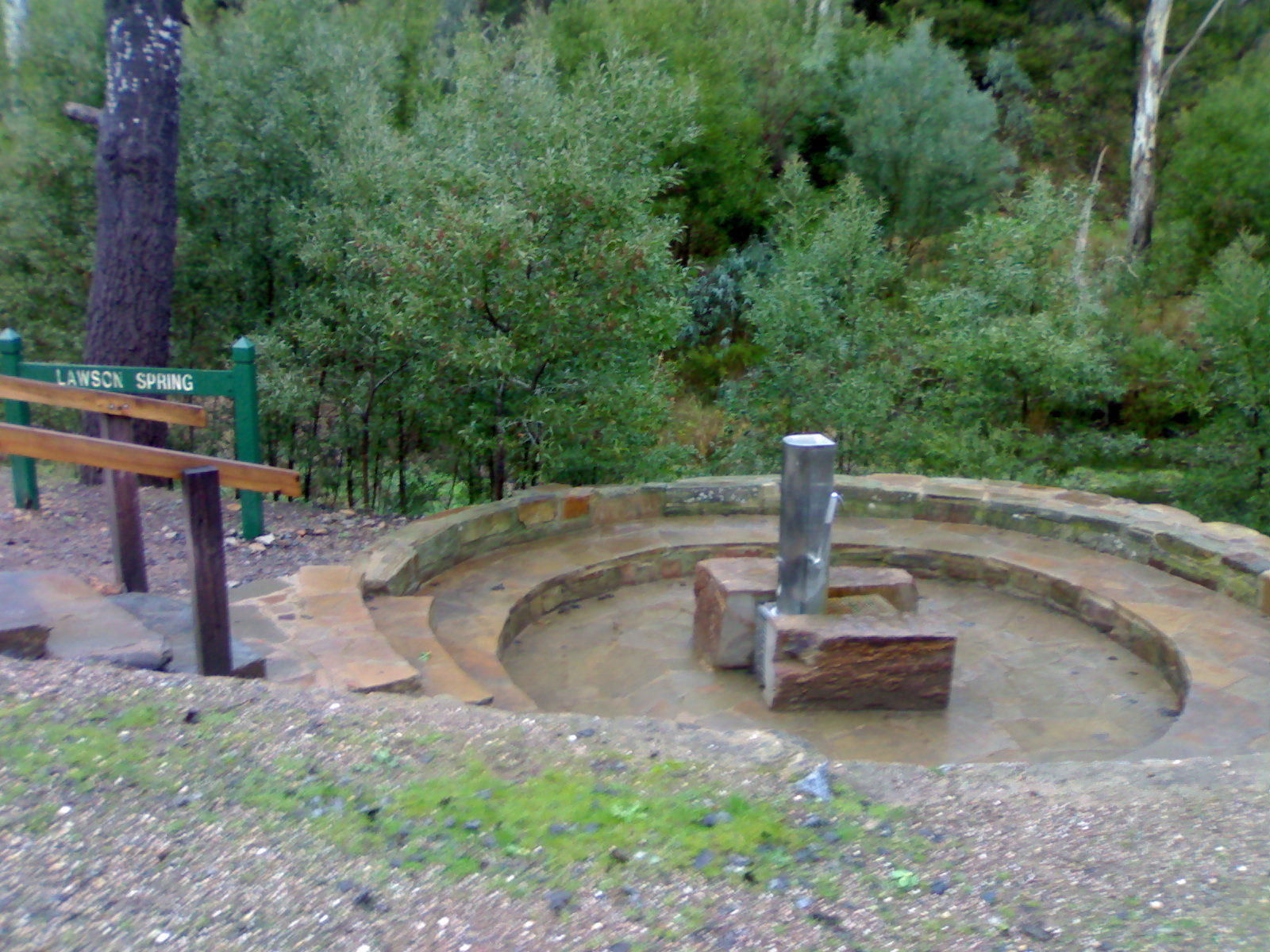
Lawson spring beside the Loddon river

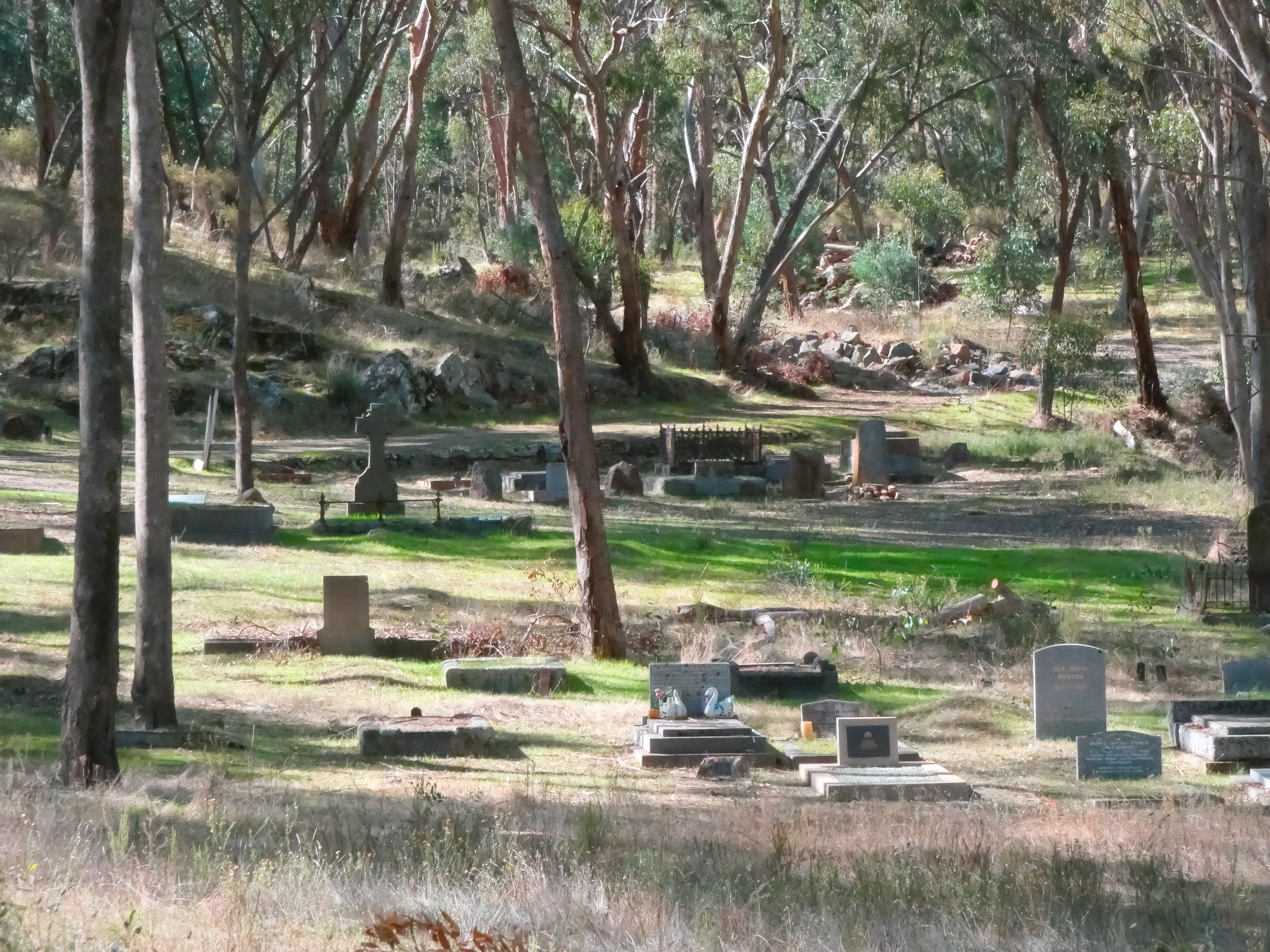
Cemetery at Vaughan
