= Sandon, Victoria =

Sandon Victoria
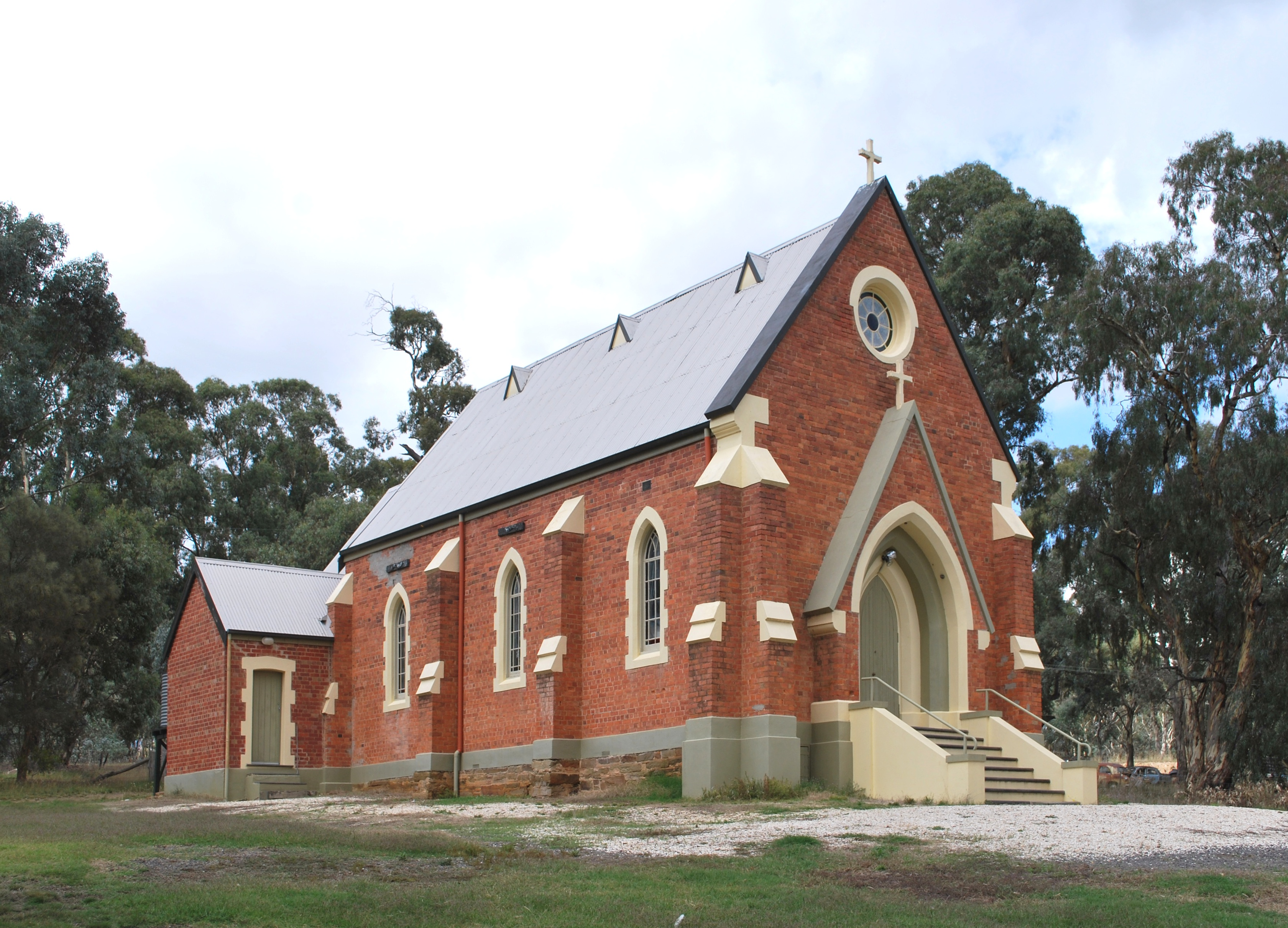
- St Laurence O'Toole Roman Catholic church at Sandon

- Coordinates: 37°10′4″S 144°02′20″E
- Population: 89 (2021 census)
- Postcode(s): 3462
- Location: 142 km (88 mi) NW of Melbourne; 25 km (16 mi) SW of Castlemaine; 8 km (5 mi) S of Newstead
- LGA(s): Shire of Mount Alexander; Shire of Hepburn
- State electorate(s): Bendigo West
- Federal division(s): Bendigo

Sandon is a locality in the Shire of Hepburn and Mount Alexander Shire, Victoria, Australia, located 106 kilometres (66 mi) north west of the state capital, Melbourne. At the 2021 census, Sandon had a population of 89.
