= Neereman =

Neereman Victoria
- Coordinates: 36°55′06″S 143°57′15″E
- Population: 23 (2021 census)
- Postcode(s): 3463
- LGA(s): Shire of Mount Alexander
- State electorate(s): Bendigo West
- Federal division(s): Bendigo

Neereman is a locality in Shire of Mount Alexander, Victoria, Australia. At the 2021 census, Neereman had a population of 23.
