= Sutton Grange, Victoria =

Sutton Grange
- Town
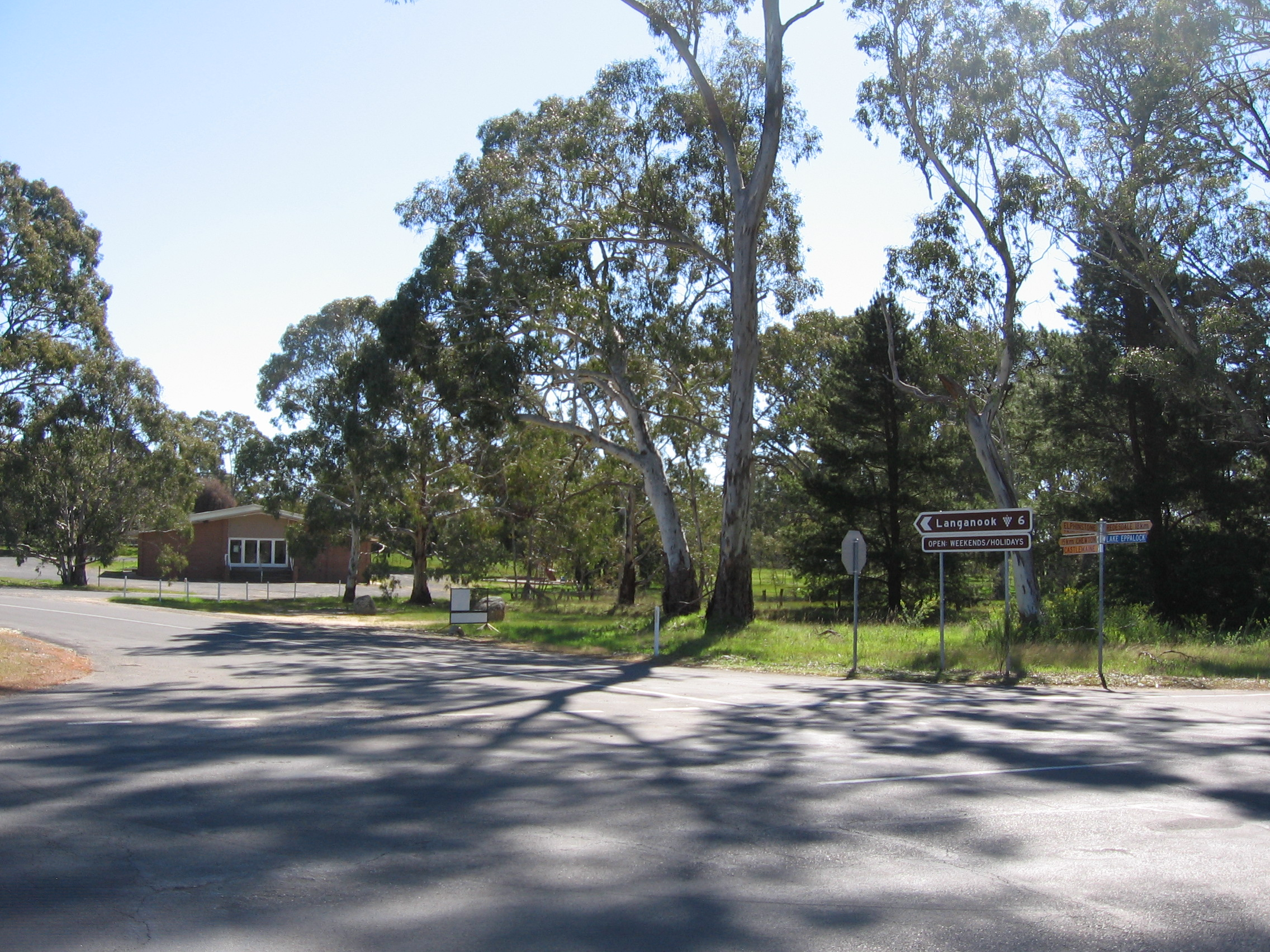
- Intersection at Sutton Grange, including the public hall

- Coordinates: 36°59′S 144°22′E
- Country: Australia
- State: Victoria
- LGA: Shire of Mount Alexander
- Location: 125 km (78 mi) NW of Melbourne; 30 km (19 mi) from Bendigo; 15 km (9.3 mi) E of Harcourt

Government
  - State electorate: Macedon
  - Federal division: Bendigo

Population
  - Total: 160 (2021 census)
- Postcode: 3448

Sutton Grange is a locality located approximately 30 kilometres (19 mi) south of Bendigo in Victoria, Australia.

At the 2021 Census, Sutton Grange had a population of 160.

The only public facility now remaining is the local community hall in the centre of town.

A war memorial across the road from the hall dates from 1922. The Albert Cox Wildlife Memorial Sanctuary is located in Sutton Grange.

== History ==
Sutton Grange Post Office opened on 1 August 1865 and closed in 1970. A school was established at Sutton Grange in 1865, with John K Wait as the first head teacher and an enrolment of 20 students. A new granite school building, designed by architect Thomas Muntz, was constructed in 1870 and the original weatherboard building was converted into a teacher's house. Bushfires in 1944 destroyed the teacher's house and part of a timber plantation, but the granite school building survived. A replacement house was transferred from Faraday in 1945. The school was renamed Sutton Grange Primary School in 1970 and closed in 1989. The brick Congregational Church at Sutton Grange, now the Uniting Church, was built in 1874.

=== Cheese factory ===
A cheese factory was constructed at Sutton Grange around 1895 by the Fresh Food and Frozen Storage Company, though it remained idle for several years due to dry seasons. By August 1900, the company announced plans to remove the plant to Gippsland due to an insufficient milk supply, which suppliers had blamed on low prices. The manager, Mr. Ludlow, purchased the factory himself to prevent its removal.

In October 1900, 12,965 gallons of milk were processed into over six tons of cheese, with demand exceeding supply. Farmers received 3½ pence per gallon for their milk. By December 1906, the factory had attracted the attention of the state government. A government cheese expert visited the factory, and the proprietor was requested to manufacture a quantity of special‑size cheese for the London market as part of a Department of Agriculture initiative to encourage cheese exports. Only cheese classed as the very best was to be accepted for the first consignment.

By 1913, the factory was producing cheese of recognised quality, having won first prizes at major shows across Victoria. The factory was equipped with a Tangye engine, a 750‑gallon double‑jacket vat, and a cheese room with double walls packed with sawdust capable of storing seven tons of cheese. During the five months ending 31 May 1913, the factory processed 20,000 more gallons of milk than the same period the previous year, paying farmers 5¼d per gallon – significantly more than the 3½d to 4d paid for butter. The factory supplied 250 regular customers directly across Australia, eliminating middlemen.

The property also included over 100 beehives, producing five tons of honey that year (and up to 12 tons in a good year), and a piggery fed by whey piped from the cheese room. Ludlow also owned the Emu Flat factory and was a partner in factories at Molesworth and Flowerdale. He had erected the local hotel, store, and post office, which he later sold to Mr. Bevis. The cheese factory closed in July 1927 due to a shortage of milk supplies. The plant was relocated to a northern irrigation settlement.

== Geographical features ==
Through Sutton Grange runs Myrtle Creek, which flows into the Coliban River and both of them are infested with carp. Sutton Grange is also surrounded by mountains and hills, the highest of which is Mount Alexander. The terrain and soil around Sutton Grange has a high percentage of quartz and granite.
