= Ravenswood South =

Ravenswood South Victoria
- Coordinates: 36°56′15″S 144°13′31″E
- Population: 76 (2021 census)
- Postcode(s): 3453
- LGA(s): Shire of Mount Alexander
- State electorate(s): Bendigo West
- Federal division(s): Bendigo

Ravenswood South is a locality in Shire of Mount Alexander, Victoria, Australia. At the 2021 census, Ravenswood South had a population of 76.
