= Eastville, Victoria =

Eastville Victoria
- Coordinates: 36°52′17″S 143°57′14″E
- Population: 13 (2021 census)
- Postcode(s): 3463
- LGA(s): Shire of Loddon; Shire of Mount Alexander
- State electorate(s): Bendigo West
- Federal division(s): Bendigo; Mallee

Eastville is locality in the Shire of Loddon and the Shire of Mount Alexander, Victoria, Australia. At the 2021 census, Eastville had a population of 13.
