= Harcourt, Victoria =

Town in Victoria, Australia

Harcourt
- Town
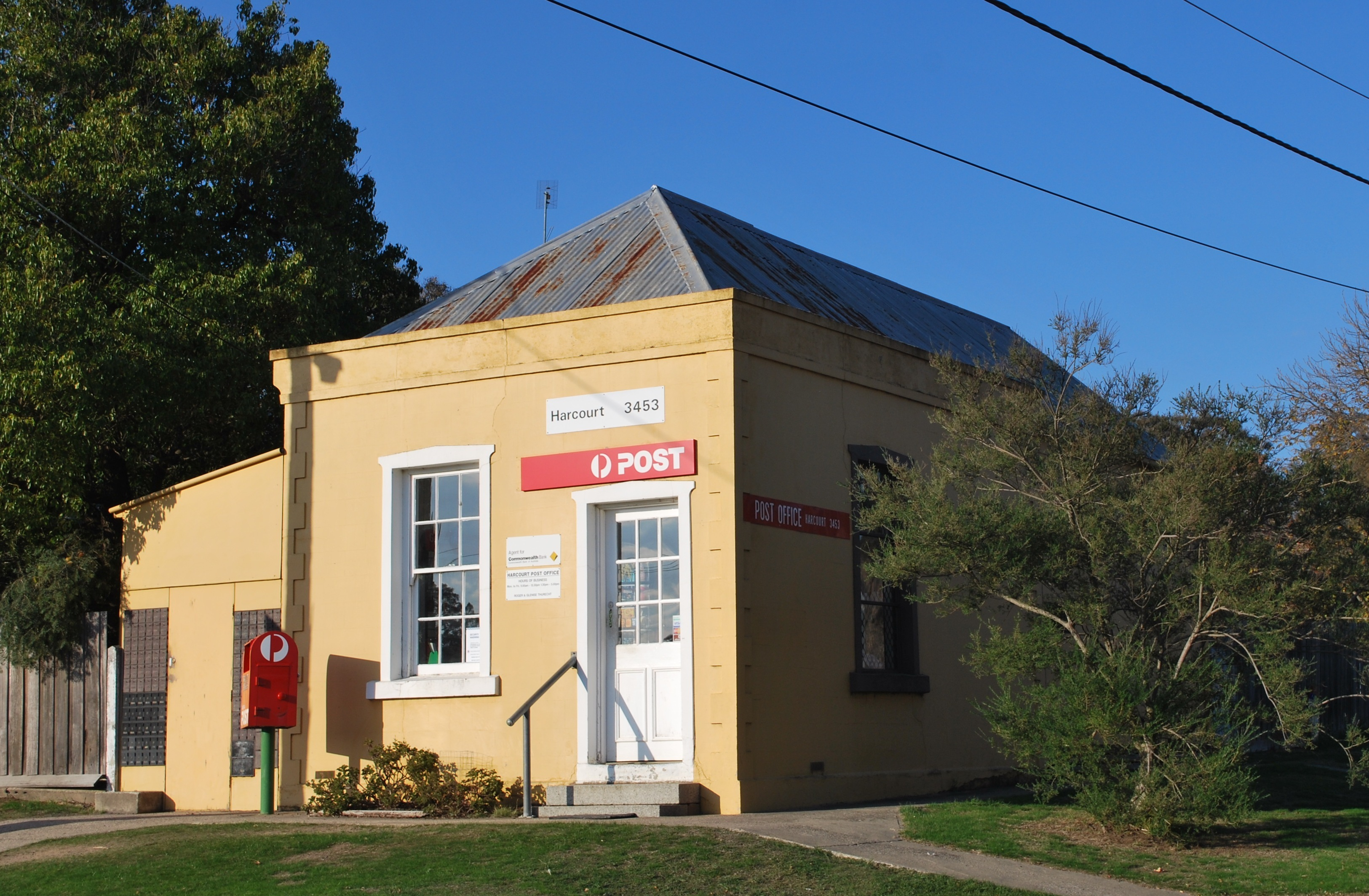
- Post office, opened in 1858

- Interactive map of Harcourt
- Coordinates: 37°00′S 144°15′E
- Country: Australia
- State: Victoria
- LGA: Shire of Mount Alexander
- Location: 121 km (75 mi) from Melbourne; 30 km (19 mi) from Bendigo; 9 km (5.6 mi) from Castlemaine

Government
  - State electorate: Bendigo West
  - Federal division: Bendigo

Population
  - Total: 1,038 (2021 census)
- Time zone: UTC+10 (AEST)
  - Summer (DST): UTC+11 (AEST)
- Postcode: 3453

Harcourt is a town in the Loddon Mallee region of the state of Victoria, Australia. It is about 8 kilometres (5 miles) north-east of Castlemaine, where the Midland Highway meets the Calder Highway. At the 2021 census, Harcourt had a population of 1,038. The town was named after Sir William Harcourt.

== History ==
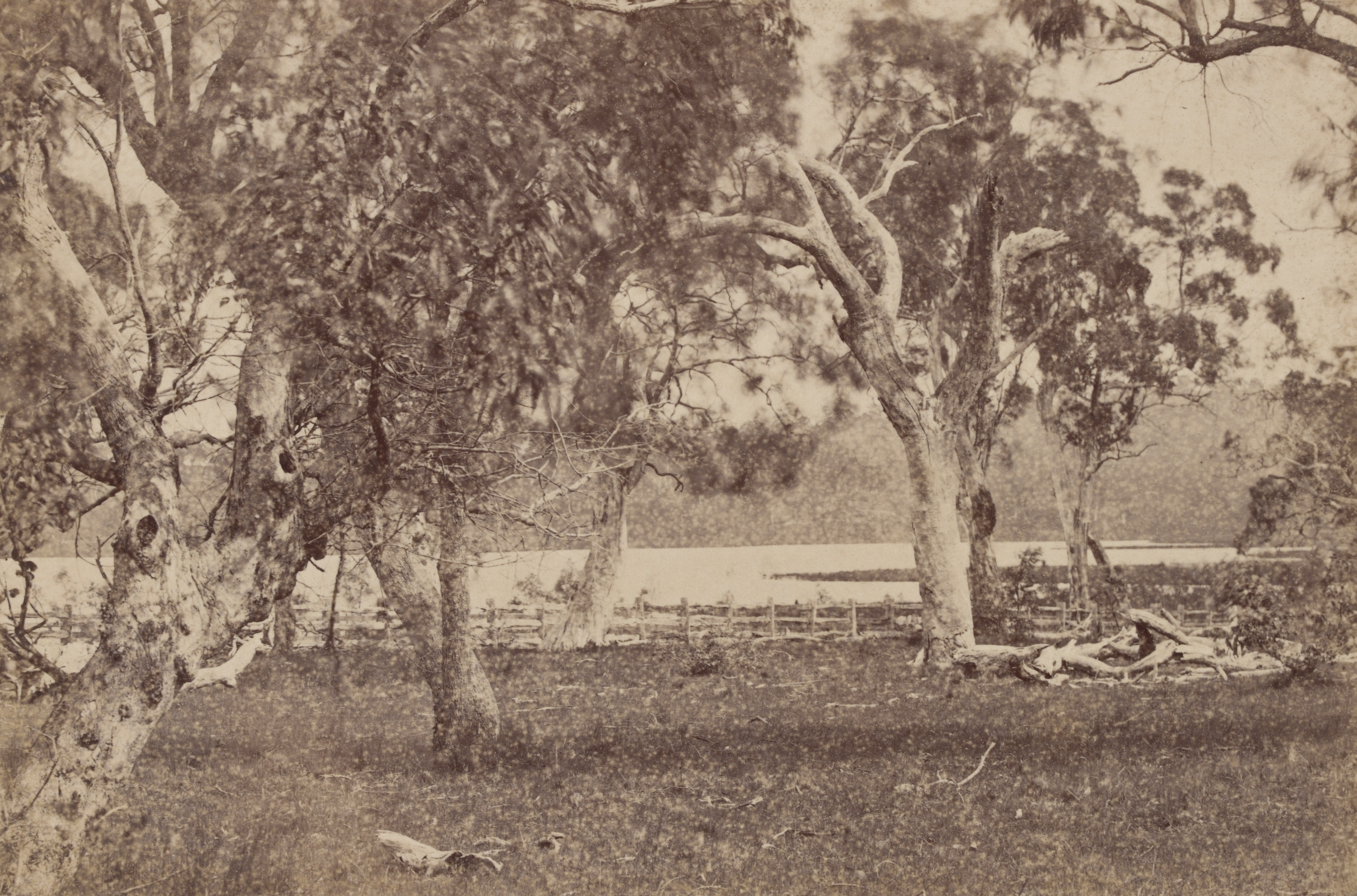
Harcourt Reservoir. Mount Alexander 78 Miles N.N.W. from Melbourne

The Post Office opened on 27 February 1858 replacing that of nearby Mount Alexander open since 1856.

== Overview ==
Set in a valley at the foot of Mount Alexander, Harcourt was once the premier apple growing region in Australia. Still a major apple producer today, the local area is known for wine and cider production.

Other things of interest in and around the town are trout fishing and the numerous walking tracks in Mount Alexander Park. Within the park boundary there is an old oak forest which was established by the tanning industry for the acorns. It is home to a World's largest apple. Each year on the March Labour Day long weekend the town hosts the Harcourt Applefest with local produce on sale in stalls, music concerts and several sports on show.

Harcourt granite stone is widely used through Australia for soldier memorials, headstones and buildings of historical note.

The town has an Australian Rules football team competing in the Maryborough Castlemaine District Football League.

Harcourt railway station is on the Bendigo line, but has been closed since 1981. The closest operating train station is Castlemaine.

La Larr Ba Gauwa Mountain Bike Park is riding distance (2 km) from the centre of Harcourt.

Harcourt facilities include a small post office, a petrol station, general store, community swimming pool, public hall, public toilets, recreation reserve, primary school and a motel.

== 2026 Bushfire ==
On 8 January 2026, the northern part of the state was declared a Catastrophic fire Danger Rating due to the dry, windy weather.

On 9 January, a grassfire had broken out on Fogartys Gap Road in Ravenswood South and travelled in a southeastern direction towards the town of Harcourt. Over 124 fire crew helped fight the blaze and the township of Harcourt had less than 30 minutes to get out. 52 homes were lost in the fire while the primary school, kindergarten, general store and service station have survived. The town's coolstore was lost. The miniature Victorian railway also survived the bushfire.

On 10 January, the Emergency warnings were downgraded to a Watch and Act level but was not safe to return due to the fires still burning out of control.
