= Seedsman =

Seedsman is the surname of the following people:

- Bill Seedsman (1914–2001), Australian rules footballer
- Paul Seedsman (born 1992), Australian rules footballer
- Reg Seedsman (1895–1983), Australian rules footballer

== See also ==
- Mount Seedsman in Antarctica
