= Jeff Patterson (footballer) =

Australian rules footballer

Personal information
- Full name: Jeffrey Leo Patterson
- Born: 3 November 1928
- Died: 28 April 2013 (aged 84)
- Original teams: Maldon (CDFL), Castlemaine (BFL)
- Height: 183 cm (6 ft 0 in)
- Weight: 80 kg (176 lb)
- Position: Follower

Playing career^{1}
Years	Club	Games (Goals)
1951–52	South Melbourne	20 (2)
1953–54	Richmond	14 (4)
1954	Fitzroy	7 (6)
Total		41 (12)
- ^{1} Playing statistics correct to the end of 1954.

Jeffrey Leo Patterson (3 November 1928 – 28 April 2013) was a boxer, Australian rules footballer who played with South Melbourne, Richmond and Fitzroy in the Victorian Football League (VFL) and event promoter.

== Early life ==
Born in the great depression, Patterson was abandoned on a doorstep the day he was born, being taken in by the family that owned the bootmaker's shop where he was found. After the death of his adoptive father, he was in and out of boys' homes for truancy.

== Football ==
Patterson started his football career with Maldon in the Castlemaine District Football League, then spent one season with Bendigo Football League (BFL) club Castlemaine before being recruited by South Melbourne.

Debuting in the 1951 VFL season, Patterson played a total of 41 games with South Melbourne, Richmond and Fitzroy, before moving to Tasmania at the end of the 1954 VFL season to play with Cornwall (later known as East Launceston) in the Northern Tasmania Football Association (NTFA) for six seasons. A leading player in the NTFA, Patterson was selected to play seven games for Tasmania.

== Promoter ==
On moving to Launceston, Patterson bought a local hotel but fled Launceston for Europe in 1960, leaving large debts. Patterson remade himself as a promoter in Europe, involved with famous acts such as the Everly Brothers, Sammy Davis Jr., Roy Orbison, Fats Domino and Edith Piaf. He also had dealings with the likes of the infamous Kray twins.
