= Maldon Football and Netball Club =

Maldon

Names
- Full name: Maldon Football and Netball Club
- Nickname: Bombers

Club details
- Founded: 1873
- Colours: Black Red
- Competition: Maryborough Castlemaine District Football League
- Premierships: (30) 1894, 1896, 1898, 1899, 1900, 1901, 1902, 1904, 1905, 1906, 1908, 1909, 1914, 1920, 1923, 1927, 1931, 1933, 1949, 1950, 1951, 1952, 1955, 1956, 1957, 1983, 1985, 1987, 1988, 2010
- Ground: Bill Woodfull Oval, Maldon

Other information
- Official website: Maldon FNC website

The Maldon Football and Netball Club is an Australian rules football club that plays in the Maryborough Castlemaine District Football League and is situated in the township of Maldon, Victoria, in the central Victorian goldfields. The clubs plays its home games at Bill Woodfull Oval, Maldon, Victoria. The club's nickname is known as the Bombers.

== History ==
The club was established in 1873 at a meeting at Ellis' Exchange Hotel on Monday 12th May 1873.

The club played in the Castlemaine District Football Association from 1890 to 1913, then in the Castlemaine District Football League from 1914 to 1951. The Castlemaine DFA changed its name to the Castlemaine DF League at its annual meeting April, 1914.

In 1900, Maldon, premiers of the Castlemaine District Football Association defeated Timor, the premiers of the Maryborough District Football League.

Maldon won the 1891 Castlemaine Junior Football Association premiership.

The club won its first premiership in 1894 and then dominated the competition, finishing either first or second on the premiership ladder, every year between 1894 and 1909 (16 consecutive years) and also winning 15 premierships between 1894 and 1923.

It lost only one match between 1898 and 1902. Syd Titus, father of famous Richmond player, Jack Titus, captained Maldon for nine years, including seven premierships in the late 1890's, early 1900's.

Between 1927 and 1934 the club was known as Tarrengower Football Club.

In 1950, Maldon played Carlton in a practice match at Princes Park.

Between 1965 and 1979 the club played 15 seasons in the Golden City Football League. It made the finals on four occasions but lost every finals match it played.

== Football Premierships ==
Seniors

=== Castlemaine_District_Football_Association (1890 to 1913) ===
- 1894, 1896, 1898, 1899, 1900, 1901, 1902, 1904, 1905, 1906, 1908, 1909 (12)

=== Castlemaine District Football League (1914 to 1951) ===
- 1914, 1920, 1923, 1927, 1931, 1933, 1949, 1950, 1951 (9)
- (1927, 1931, 1933 - won by the Tarrengower FC)

=== Maryborough Castlemaine District Football League (1952 to 1964) ===
- 1952: Maldon: 13.14 - 92 d Campbell's Creek: 9.9 - 63
- 1955: Maldon: 14.7 - 91 d Carisbrook: 8.7 - 55
- 1956: Maldon: 15.12 - 102 d Dunolly: 13.8 - 86
- 1957: Maldon: 12.9 - 81 d Dunolly: 10.5 - 65

=== Golden City Football League (1965 to 1979) ===
- No premierships

=== Maryborough Castlemaine District Football League (1980 to 2025) ===
- 1983 - Maldon: 20.19 - 139 d Primrose: 14.14 - 110
- 1985 - Maldon: 19.15 - 129 d Chewton: 14.11 - 95
- 1987 - Maldon: 14.11 - 95 d Chewton: 10.14 - 74
- 1988 - Maldon: 13.13 - 91 d Talbot: 12.13 - 85
- 2010 - Maldon: 11.12 - 78 d Avoca: 9.10 - 64

Reserves

- ?

Thirds

- ?

Juniors

Castlemaine District Junior Football Association

- 1891

== League Best and Fairest ==
Castlemaine District Football League - Albert Harvey Medal

- 1932 - D Rice: Tarrangower
- 1933 - Harry Tatt: Tarrangower

Maryborough Castlemaine District Football League

- 1981 - Glen Roy
- 1983 - Ken Patton
- 2015 - Hayden Kelly
- 2021 - Tommy Horne
- 2024- Damian Wust

== Leading Goalkickers ==
Seniors

- Maryborough Castlemaine District Football League
- 1982 - 90: Russell Emmens
- 1984 - 90: Russell Emmens
- 1987 - 100: Darren Rice
- 1988 - 121: Darren Rice
- 1988 - 138: Darren Rice
- 1991 - 109: Darren Rice
- 1999 - 83: Michael Howell
- 2011 - 121: Christian Kelly

== VFL / AFL Players ==
The following footballers played with Maldon FC, prior to playing senior football in the VFL/AFL, and / or were drafted, with the year indicating their VFL/AFL debut.

Player	VFL/AFL Clubs	VFL/AFL Career	Notes/References
Jim Baxter	Collingwood	1907-09	WW1 war veteran
Tom Baxter	Collingwood	1907-12	1910 VFL Premiership
Len Bowe	Essendon	1907-20	1911 & 1912 VFL Premierships
Jim Bonella	Melbourne	1908	
George Oliver	Melbourne	1909	
Sid O'Neill	Fitzroy	1909	Killed in WW1
Rupe Benstead	Essendon	1911	
Billy Robinson	Carlton	1915-18	1914 Stawell Gift winner, 1915 VFL Premiership
Les Murray	Footscray	1951	Kicked 100 plus goals for Maldon in 1950
Jeff Patterson	South Melbourne, Richmond, Fitzroy	1951-54	

VFL Players born in Maldon

- Bill Benton
- Bill Bowe
- Ken Collicoat
- Jack Malone
- Charlie Peterson
- Bill Seedsman
- Jack Titus
- George Welsh
- Len Yemm

== Books ==
- History of Football in the Bendigo District - John Stoward - ISBN 978-0-9805929-1-7

== Links ==
- Maldon FNC - Facebook
- Maldon FNC website via Gameday website
- 1923 - Castlemaine DFL Premiers: Maldon FC team photo
- 1950 - Maldon FC team photo v Carlton FC
