= Les Murray =

Les Murray may refer to:

- Les Murray (broadcaster) (1945–2017), Hungarian-Australian association football broadcaster
- Les Murray (footballer) (1928–1999), Australian footballer
- Les Murray (poet) (1938–2019), Australian poet and critic
