= Billy Robinson (Australian footballer) =

Australian rules footballer

Personal information
- Full name: William Rupert Clarence Robinson
- Born: 13 August 1890; Maldon, Victoria
- Died: 14 March 1969 (aged 78); Preston, Victoria
- Original teams: Maldon, Temperance (MDFL), Footscray (VFA)
- Height: 178 cm (5 ft 10 in)
- Weight: 73 kg (161 lb)

Playing career^{1}
Years	Club	Games (Goals)
1915–1918	Carlton	30 (1)
- ^{1} Playing statistics correct to the end of 1918.

William Rupert Clarence Robinson (13 August 1890 – 14 March 1969) was an Australian rules footballer who played with Carlton in the Victorian Football League (VFL).

Robinson initially played football with Maldon in the Castlemaine Football Association, then with Temperance FC in the Maryborough Castlemaine District Football League in 1913.

Robinson was the centre half-back in Carlton's 1915 premiership team. He also played in the 1916 VFL Grand Final, which Carlton lost.

He won the Stawell Gift in 1914.

== Links ==
- Bill Robinson Player Profile via Blueseum
- Stawell Gift winners list via Stawell Gift
