= Rupe Benstead =

Australian rules footballer

Personal information
- Full name: Rupert Thomas David Benstead
- Born: 5 June 1889; Maldon, Victoria
- Died: 17 November 1961 (aged 72); Maldon, Victoria
- Original teams: Maldon, Long Gully

Playing career^{1}
Years	Club	Games (Goals)
1911	Essendon	4 (0)
- ^{1} Playing statistics correct to the end of 1911.

Rupert Thomas David Benstead (5 June 1889 – 17 November 1961) was an Australian rules footballer who played with Essendon in the Victorian Football League (VFL).
