= Castlemaine District Football Association =

Australian rules football association

- Founded: 1889

The Castlemaine District Football Association was formed in 1889 and initially played for the Embley Cup, donated by Mr W Embley and ceased after the 1952 season and was based in Castlemaine.

== History ==
The Castlemaine District Football Association was formed in 1889 and initially played for the Embley Cup, donated by Mr W Embley.

In 1890, Maldon joined the Castlemaine DFA and played against Castlemaine, Castlemaine Foundry and Taradale, while Newstead dropped out.

In May 1890, Castlemaine Foundry FC and Castlemaine FC decided to amalgamate for the purpose of playing in some senior competitions, which meant representative matches or friendly matches against other local towns. The two clubs still played against each other in the local trophy competition (Castlemaine & DFA) in 1890 as Foundry finished first on 38 points to Castlemaine's 24 points.

It appears that in 1893, there was no senior football competition, only a junior competition, but the Castlemaine DFA was reformed in May 1894.

In August 1901, Collingwood: 9.16 - 70 defeated Castlemaine DFA: 6.9 - 45, which was played on the Camp Reserve Oval and in June 1904, Collingwood: 8.14 - 62 defeated Castlemaine DFA: 6.7 - 43, also played on the Camp Reserve Oval.

The Castlemaine DFA changed its name to the Castlemaine DF League at its annual meeting April, 1914. Between 1927 and 1933 Maldon FC was known as the Tarrengower Football Club.

From 1925, the Castlemaine District FC played in the Bendigo Football League, while the Castlemaine United FC re-appeared in the Castlemaine District Football League from 1932 onwards.

Castlemaine United Football Club joined the Bendigo Football League in 1949, much to the disappointment of the CDFL.

The Maryborough & DFL "poached" both the Maldon and Campbell's Creek clubs from the Castlemaine District Football League, prior to the 1952 football season. Other clubs from the Castlemaine District Football League moved to the Bendigo District Football Association.

== Clubs ==
The following information provides what season each club played in the Castlemaine District Football Association/League. The only years not completely cross referenced are - 1927, 1945. There is some difficulty identifying the various names of the different Castlemaine Football Clubs, particularly in the seasons of 1926 and 1932 and 1933.

=== Final ===
Club	Colours	Nickname	Home Ground	Former league	Est.	Years in CDFA	CDFA Senior Premierships		Fate
Club	Colours	Nickname	Home Ground	Former league	Est.	Years in CDFA	Total	Years	Fate
Chewton (Chewton-Elphinstone 1933-34)		Tigers	Chewton Soldiers Memorial Park, Chewton	OT	1887	1895-1896, 1933-1952	2	1938, 1948	Moved to Castlemaine JFA in 1897. Moved to Bendigo FA in 1953.
Malmsbury	Dark with light MFC monogram		Malmsbury Recreation Reserve, Malmsbury	MDFL	1879	1934-1940, 1946-1952	1	1952	Recess in 1940. Moved to Daylesford DFL in 1953.
Trentham		Grasshoppers	Trentham Recreation Reserve, Trentham	TDFA	1892	1915, 1924-1925, 1937-1940, 1946-1952	0	-	Moved to Kyneton District FL in 1926. Recess in 1941. Moved to Riddell District FL in 1953.
Woodend		Rebels	Gilbert Gordon Reserve, Woodend	RDFL	1880	1925, 1940-1952	0	-	Moved to Kyneton District FL in 1926. Moved to Riddell District FL in 1953.

=== Former ===
Club	Colours	Nickname	Home Ground	Former league	Est.	Years in CDFA	CDFA Senior Premierships		Fate
Club	Colours	Nickname	Home Ground	Former league	Est.	Years in CDFA	Total	Years	Fate
Campbells Creek	(1920s)(?-1951)	Magpies, Creekers	Campbells Creek Recreation Reserve, Campbells Creek	–	1864	1919-1923, 1926-1951	3	1919, 1922, 1926	Recess from 1924-25. Moved to Maryborough DFL in 1952.
Castlemaine Central (Castlemaine Imperials 1894-97)			Camp Reserve, Castlemaine	–	1894	1894-1902	0	-	Folded after 1902 season
Castlemaine United (1) (Castlemaine seconds 1926-30)		Demons	Camp Reserve, Castlemaine	MDFL	1926	1926-1930, 1932-1938	1	1929	Played in Midlands District FL in 1931. Merged with Castlemaine in 1939
Castlemaine United (2)(Castlemaine 1889, 1910-24)	(?-1924)(1939-48)	Demons	Camp Reserve, Castlemaine	BFL	1859	1889-1899, 1910-1924, 1939-1948	6	1895, 1897, 1915, 1944, 1946, 1947	Recess 1904-09. Moved to Bendigo FL in 1925 and 1949.
Chewton Miners			Chewton Soldiers Memorial Park, Chewton	–	1904	1904-1907	0	-	Folded after 1907 season
Daylesford		Demons	Victoria Park, Daylesford	WDFA, CFL	1877	1914, 1920-1925, 1946-1951	0	-	Entered recess in 1915. Moved to Kyneton DFA in 1926. Moved to Ballarat FL in 1952.
Forest Creek				–	1896	1896-1900, 1909-1910	0	-	Recess from 1901-08. Folded after 1910 season
Foundry United	Dark with light band		Camp Reserve, Castlemaine	KDFA	1884	1889-1892, 1894, 1900-1926, 1929-1930	10	1889, 1890, 1891, 1892, 1903, 1907, 1910, 1911, 1912, 1924	Recess in 1893 and from 1895-99. Played in Kyneton DFA from 1927-28. Moved to Midlands DFL in 1931.
Fryerstown			Fryerstown Recreation Reserve, Fryerstown	–	1894	1894-1895, 1899-1901	0	-	Recess from 1896-98. Folded after 1901 season
Guildford			John Powell Reserve, Guildford	CJFA	1892	1894-1896, 1898-1900, 1906-1911, 1920, 1926-1934	1	1928	Recess in 1897, 1901-05 and 1912-19. Moved to Castlemaine 3rd Rate FA in 1921. Folded in 1935.
Harcourt		Lions	Harcourt Recreation Reserve, Harcourt	CJFA	1889	1895-1896, 1898-1901, 1926, 1929-1940, 1946-1951	1	1937	Entered recess in 1902, re-formed in Gaynor-Vaughan FA in 1907. 1927-28 unknown. Recess in 1941. Moved to Bendigo FA in 1952
Kyneton			Kyneton Showgrounds, Kyneton	WDFA, KDFA, TDFA, BFL	1868	1913-1915, 1921, 1923-1925, 1945-1946	1	1945	Moved to Kyneton DFA in 1919 and 1926. Played in Trentham DFA in 1922. Moved to Bendigo FL in 1947.
Kyneton Collegians	Dark with light vee		Kyneton Showgrounds, Kyneton	WDFA	1902	1913-1915, 1920-1925	3	1913, 1921, 1925	Recess from 1916-19. Formed Kyneton DFA in 1926.
Kyneton CYMS			Kyneton Showgrounds, Kyneton	MDFL	1932	1934-1941	4	1934, 1935, 1936, 1940	Folded after 1941 season
Maldon (Tarrengower 1927-34)	(1920s)(?-1951)	Bombers, Dons	Bill Woodful Reserve, Maldon	–	1873	1890-1951	22	1894, 1896, 1898, 1899, 1900, 1901, 1902, 1904, 1905, 1906, 1908, 1909, 1914, 1920, 1923, 1927, 1931, 1933, 1939, 1949, 1950, 1951	Moved to Maryborough DFL in 1952
Miners United			Chewton Soldiers Memorial Park, Chewton	–	1902	1902	0	-	Folded after 1902 season
Muckleford			North Muckleford Cricket Ground, Muckleford	–	1926	1926-1931	1	1930	Folded after 1931 season
Newstead			Newstead Recreation Reserve, Newstead	CJFA, CFA, MFA	1881	1894-1899, 1901-1907, 1910-1913, 1920-1921, 1926, 1928-1930, 1935-1936, 1946-1949	0	-	Entered recess in 1900, 1908 and 1914. Played in Clunes FA from 1931-34. Played in Maryborough FA in 1927 and from 1937-45. Folded after 1949 season, re-formed in Maryborough FL in 1960.
Newstead/Guildford				–	1889	1889	0	-	De-merged into Newstead and Guildford
Taradale			Taradale Cricket Ground, Taradale	–	1881	1889-1890, 1894, 1896	0	-	Folded after 1896 season

== Premierships ==
- Castlemaine District Football Association
- 1889 - 1st: Foundry United, 2nd: Castlemaine United
- 1890 - 1st: Foundry United, 2nd: Castlemaine United
- 1891 - Foundry United
- 1892 - 1st: Foundry United, 2nd: Castlemaine United & Maldon
- 1893 - CDFA in recess
- 1894 - 1st: Maldon, 2nd: Castlemaine United
- 1895 - 1st: Castlemaine United*, 2nd: Maldon
- 1896 - 1st: Maldon, 2nd: Castlemaine
- 1897 - Castlemaine: 4.6 - 30 d Maldon: 0.4 - 4
- 1898 - 1st: Maldon, 2nd: Castlemaine Centrals
- 1899 - 1st: Maldon* 2nd: Forest Creek
- 1900 - Maldon
- 1901 - 1st: Maldon, 2nd: Castlemaine Central
- 1902 - 1st: Maldon, 2nd: Chewton
- 1903 - 1st: Foundry, 2nd: Maldon
- 1904 - 1st: Maldon 2nd: Castlemaine Foundry
- 1905 - Maldon: 3.9 - 27 d Chewton Miners: 3.2 - 20
- 1906 - 1st: Maldon, 2nd: Chewton Miners
- 1907 - 1st: Foundry, 2nd: Maldon
- 1908 - 1st: Maldon, 2nd: Guildford
- 1909 - 1st: Maldon, 2nd: Castlemaine
- 1910 - 1st: Foundry*, 2nd: Forest Creek
- 1911 - 1st: Foundry, 2nd: Newstead:
- 1912 - Foundry: 2.15 - 27 d Newstead: 3.4 - 22
- 1913 - Kyneton Collegians: 5.3 - 33 d Castlemaine Foundry: 2.6 - 18
- Castlemaine District Football League
- 1914 - Maldon: 17.13 - 115 d Daylesford: 5.6 - 36
- 1915 - Castlemaine: ? d Maldon: ?
- 1916-18 - In recess > WW1
- 1919 - Campbells Creek*: 12.5 - 78 d Castlemaine Foundry: 3.7 - 25
- 1920 - Maldon: 9.4 - 58 d Kyneton Collegians: 8.7 - 55
- 1921 - Kyneton Collegians: 10.16 - 76 d Castlemaine: 7.16 - 58
- 1922 - Campbells Creek: 9.13 - 67 d Kyneton Collegians: 9.9 - 63
- 1923 - Maldon: 5.11 - 41 defeated Foundry: 3.20 - 38
- 1924 - Foundry: 12.13 - 85 d Kyneton Collegians: 8.9 - 57
- 1925 - Kyneton Collegians: 15.14 - 104 d Trentham: 5.11 - 41
- 1926 - Campbells Creek: 5.12 - 42 d Newstead: 4.10 - 34
- 1927 - Tarrengower (Maldon) 10.11 - 71 d Campbell's Creek: 9.9 - 63
- 1928 - Guildford: 9.11 - 65 d Castlemaine: 7.12 - 56
- 1929 - Castlemaine: 6.10 - 46 d Tarrengower (Maldon): 4.11 - 35
- 1930 - Muckleford
- 1931 - Tarrengower (Maldon): 6.14 - 50 d Campbell's Creek: 4.19 - 43
- 1932 - Campbell's Creek: 9.13 - 67 d Tarrengower (Maldon): 10.5 - 65
- 1933 - Tarrengower (Maldon): 11.9 - 75 d Campbell's Creek: 8.12 - 60
- 1934 - Kyneton CYMS: 11.11 - 76 d Malmsbury: 4.11 - 35
- 1935 - Kyneton CYMS: 13.5 - 82 d Chewton: 9.12 - 84
- 1936 - Kyneton CYMS
- 1937 - Harcourt
- 1938 - Chewton
- 1939 - Maldon: 5.12 - 42 d Castlemaine United: 4.16 - 40
- 1940 - Kyneton CYMS: 14.11 - 95 d Castlemaine United: 12.10 - 82
- 1941 - Castlemaine United: 9.20 - 74 d Kyneton CYMS: 11.5 - 71
- 1942-43 - In recess > WW2
- 1944 - Castlemaine United d Campbell's Creek
- 1945 - Kyneton
- 1946 - Castlemaine United: 13.24 - 102 d Kyneton: ?
- 1947 - Castlemaine United d Daylesford (undefeated)
- 1948 - Chewton: 18.14 - 122 d Castlemaine United: 13.5 - 83
- 1949 - Maldon: 97 defeated Chewton: 91
- 1950 - Maldon
- 1951 - Maldon: 6.12 - 48 d Campbell's Creek: 6.10 - 46
- 1952 - Malmsbury: 11.7 - 73 d Woodend: 10.10 - 70
- - * 1895, 1899, 1910 & 1919: Undefeated premiers

== League Best and Fairest ==
- 1898 - F Marslen: Newstead

Albert Harvey Medal
(First awarded in 1932, with Harvey being a former President of the CDFL.)

- 1932 - D Rice: Tarrangower
- 1933 - Harry Tatt: Tarrangower
- 1934 -
- 1935 -
- 1936 -
- 1937 -
- 1938 - T Davies: Trentham
- 1939 - Bert Harper: Castlemaine &
  Alexander: Harcourt
- 1940 - Bert Harper: Castlemaine
- 1941 - Bert Harper: Castlemaine
- 1942 - 1943: CDFL in recess due to World War Two
- 1944 -
- 1945 - Lindsay Blackmore: Castlemaine
- 1946 - Jack Jennings: Harcourt
- 1947 -
- 1948 -
- 1949 -
- 1950 -
- 1951 -
- 1952 -

== Castlemaine District Junior Football Association ==
Premiers

- 1891 - Maldon
- 1892 - Castlemaine
- 1893 - Newstead
- 1908 - Chewton

== Links ==
- A Day at the Camp: 150 years with the Castlemaine FNC (170 page History Book)
- Camp Reserve, Castlemaine Postcard
- 1915 - The Avenue, Camp Reserve, Castlemaine
- 1914 - Castlemaine Foundry United FC team photo
- 1919 - Castlemaine DFA Premiers: Campbell's Creek FC team photo
- 1923 - Castlemaine DFA Runner Up: Castlemaine Foundry United FC team photo
- 1928 - Castlemaine DFA Premiers: Guildford FC team photo
- 1931 - Castlemaine FC & Kyneton Collegians FC team photos
- 1937 - Castlemaine DFL Premiers: Harcourt FC team photo
- 1950 - North Central Junior Sports Schools FA Premiers: Castlemaine Technical School team photo
