= Sid O'Neill =

Australian rules footballer (1888–1915)

Personal information
- Full name: Sidney John O'Neill
- Born: 4 July 1888; Maldon, Victoria
- Died: 7 August 1915 (aged 27); Gallipoli, Ottoman Turkey
- Original teams: Maldon, Frankston
- Position: Back pocket

Playing career^{1}
Years	Club	Games (Goals)
1909	Fitzroy	1 (0)
- ^{1} Playing statistics correct to the end of 1909.

Sidney John O'Neill (4 July 1888 – 7 August 1915) was an Australian rules footballer who played with Fitzroy in the Victorian Football League. He played his only league game against University, in the back pocket.

== Death ==
He served his country in World War One and was killed in action at Gallipoli on the 7th August 1915.

=== Obituary ===
SERGEANT SIDNEY JOHN O'NEILL
(killed) was a son of Dr. and Mrs. O'Neill, of Kooyong road, Armadale, and was 27 years of age.
Educated at Xavier College, Kew, he afterwards pursued pastoral pursuits in New South Wales and Queensland.
Shortly after declaration of war he left Brisbane for Melbourne, where he enlisted, and joined the 8th Light Horse in September.
He was soon promoted corporal, and at Gallipoli sergeant.
Sergeant O'Neill was a great grandson of Captain James Cuncliffe, who fought at Waterloo. – The Argus, 17 September 1915.

== See also ==
- List of Victorian Football League players who died on active service
