= Bert Harper =

Australian rules footballer (1923–1992)

Personal information
- Born: 26 January 1923
- Died: 29 December 1992 (aged 69)
- Original team: Castlemaine (Castlemaine DFA)
- Height: 179 cm (5 ft 10 in)
- Weight: 79 kg (174 lb)

Playing career^{1}
Years	Club	Games (Goals)
1943–1952	Essendon	76 (32)
- ^{1} Playing statistics correct to the end of 1952.

Career highlights
- Essendon Premiership 1946, 1950

Albert Harper (26 January 1923 – 29 December 1992) was an Australian rules footballer in the Victorian Football League (VFL).

Harper initially played with Castlemaine in the Castlemaine District Football Association and won the league's best and fairest award, the Albert Harvey Medal in 1939 1940 and 1941.

Harper was a member of Castlemaine's 1941 Castlemaine District Football Association premiership team.

Harper enlisted in the Australian Army in December 1941 and later joined the Royal Australian Air Force in October 1944.

Harper would later miss a lot football due to his war service in 1942, most of 1943 and 1944 and all of the 1945 VFL season.

Harper made his VFL debut in round one, 1943 against South Melbourne at Windy Hill, Essendon after impressing club selectors during the 1943 practice matches.

He played in Essendon's 1946 and 1950 VFL premiership teams. Harper also played in the 1947 VFL grand final and both VFL grand finals in 1948.

Harper missed the 1949 VFL grand final due to an knee injury and also missed the 1951 VFL grand final due to fractured ribs he sustained in the preliminary final.

Harper retired from VFL football at the end of 1952 and had a cartilage operation on his knee.
