= Len Bowe =

Australian rules footballer

Personal information
- Full name: Henry Leonard Bowe
- Born: 27 October 1885; Maldon, Victoria
- Died: 22 May 1954 (aged 68); Elsternwick, Victoria
- Original teams: Maldon, Castlemaine
- Height: 175 cm (5 ft 9 in)
- Weight: 76 kg (168 lb)
- Position: backline

Playing career^{1}
Years	Club	Games (Goals)
1907–15, 1918–20	Essendon	185 (4)
- ^{1} Playing statistics correct to the end of 1920.

Career highlights
- 1911 & 1912 VFL Premiership; 1912 - Victorian Representative

Henry Leonard Bowe (27 October 1885 – 22 May 1954) was an Australian rules footballer who played with Essendon in the Victorian Football League (VFL).

Bowe was a specialist defender and played in back to back Essendon premiership teams in 1911 and 1912.

In 1912 he also represented Victoria in two interstate matches against the South Australians.

He retired in 1920 after he began suffering from athlete's heart.
