= Maryborough Castlemaine District Football Netball League =

Australian rules football league

- Formerly: Maryborough District Football Association (1892-1929). Maryborough District Football League (1929-82). Absorbed some clubs from the Castlemaine District Football League in 1952.
- Sport: Australian rules football Netball
- First season: 1892
- No. of teams: 13
- Country: Australia
- Related competitions: LVFL; BFL; CHFL

The Maryborough Castlemaine District Football Netball League is an Australian rules football league based in central Victoria. This is a minor league with clubs coming from towns near the regional centres of Maryborough and Castlemaine.

== History ==
The Maryborough District Football Association was formed in 1892 with the following local clubs: Amhurst / Adelaide Lead, Carisbrook, Dunolly, Maryborough, Talbot and Timor.

In 1900, the Maryborough District Football Association was defeated in a match played against Footscray with the scores 9.17 (71) to 2.7 (19).

In 1901, Port Melbourne visited Maryborough and defeated the Maryborough association, 8.7 (55) to 2.9 (21).

In 1924, there was a draw in the grand final, the scores being Moorlort 11.12 (78) to Dunolly 9.24 (78), with Moorlort winning the replay the following week.

In 1929, the Maryborough DFA became known as the Maryborough District Football League.

Maryborough & DFL absorbed a number of clubs from the Castlemaine District Football League, when that competition ceased after the 1952 football season. Other clubs from the Castlemaine District Football League moved to the Bendigo District Football Association.

The competition's name was changed to Maryborough Castlemaine District Football League in 1982.

In 2011 the league admitted four clubs from the Lexton Plains Football League, which had gone into recess.

The highest ever score in a senior game of Australian rules football was scored in this league in 1990 when Campbells Creek defeated Primrose 100.34 (634) to 3.0 (18).

Between round one of 2014 and round ten of 2016, Navarre won 50 consecutive matches in a row in senior football in the Maryborough Castlemaine District Football League. Navarre's last loss was in the 2013 Second Qualifying Final when Newstead won by 24 points.

== Clubs ==
=== Locations ===
Locations of the Maryborough Castlemaine District FNL clubs

=== Current ===
Club	Jumper	Nickname	Home Ground	Former League	Est.	Years in MCDFNL	MCDFNL Senior Premierships	
Club	Jumper	Nickname	Home Ground	Former League	Est.	Years in MCDFNL	Total	Years
Avoca		Bulldogs	Avoca Recreation Reserve, Avoca	PDFA, LPFL	1873	1925, 2005–	0	-
Campbells Creek		Magpies, Creekers	Campbells Creek Recreation Reserve, Campbells Creek	CDFL	1864	1952–	1	1953
Carisbrook		Redbacks	Carisbrook Recreation Reserve, Carisbrook	–	c.1900s	1901, 1919–	18	1914, 1925, 1929, 1949, 1950, 1954, 1960, 1964, 1970, 1976, 1980, 1999, 2004, 2005, 2008, 2012, 2017, 2018
Dunolly		Eagles	Dunolly Recreation Reserve, Dunolly	LVFL	1873	1919–35, 1944-1981, 2004–	14	1907, 1909, 1910, 1919, 1920, 1930, 1932, 1933, 1958, 1959, 1961, 1962, 1963, 1969
Harcourt		Lions	Harcourt Recreation Reserve, Harcourt	GCFL	1889	1970–	8	1971, 2002, 2003, 2006, 2007, 2022, 2023, 2026
Lexton		Tigers	Lexton Recreation Reserve, Lexton	LPFL	1920	2011–	0	-
Maldon		Bombers	Bill Woodful Reserve, Maldon	GCFL	1873	1952–	9	1952, 1955, 1956, 1957, 1983, 1985, 1987, 1988, 2010
Maryborough		Magpies	Princes Park, Maryborough	BFNL	1872	1905, 2027-	0	-
Maryborough Giants		Giants	JH Hedges Memorial Park, Maryborough	–	2023	2024–	0	-
Natte Bealiba		Swans	Natte Yallock Recreation Reserve, Natte Yallock	LPFL	1961	2011–	3	2011, 2019, 2024
Navarre		Grasshoppers	Navarre Recreation Reserve, Navarre	LPFL	1920	2011–	4	2013, 2014, 2015, 2016
Newstead		Kangaroos	Newstead Recreation Reserve, Newstead	CDFL	1881	1960–	6	1939, 1966, 1979, 1993, 2000, 2009
Talbot		Hawks	Talbot Recreation Reserve, Talbot	CFL	c.1870s	1956–	7	1965, 1989, 1995, 1996, 1997, 1998, 2001
Trentham		Saints	Trentham Recreation Reserve, Trentham	RDFNL	1892	1988–	3	1992, 1994, 2025

=== Former ===
Club	Jumper	Nickname	Home Ground	Former League	Est.	Years in MCDFNL	MCDFNL Senior Premierships		Fate
Club	Jumper	Nickname	Home Ground	Former League	Est.	Years in MCDFNL	Total	Years	Fate
Bealiba	(1924-26)(1927-29)(1945-48)	Woodcutters	Bealiba Recreation Reserve, Bealiba	KKFL	c.1870s	1924-1929, 1932-1935, 1945-1948	2	1927, 1928	Played in Kara Kara FL between 1930-31. Entered recess in 1936. Moved to Loddon Valley FL following 1948 season
Bowenvale				–	c.1900s	1892, 1899, 1905, 1908	1	1899	Folded
Bristol Hill				MJFA	1919	1921-1954	3	1904, 1923, 1926	Folded
Campbelltown				–	c.1920s	1938-1939, 1947-1948	0	-	Merged with Newstead in 1940 to form Newstead Campbelltown, re-formed in 1947. Folded after 1948 season.
Chewton		Tigers	Chewton Soldiers Memorial Park, Chewton	GCFL	c.1900s	1970-1990	2	1975, 1986	Folded
Clunes		Magpies	Ligar Street Reserve, Clunes	CFL	1869	1922-1924, 1928-1930, 1945	0	-	Moved to Clunes FL following 1945 season.
Majorca				MJFA	c.1920s	1934	0	-	Folded
Maryborough Rovers	(1966-?)(?-2023)	Magpies	Princes Park, Maryborough	–	1960s	1966-2023	3	1978, 1990, 1991	Merged with Royal Park to form Maryborough Giants following 2023 season.
Moolort			Carisbrook Recreation Reserve, Carisbrook	–	c.1920s	1922-1924	1	1924	Folded after 1924 season.
Natte Yallock		Swans	Natte Yallock Recreation Reserve, Natte Yallock	PDFA	c.1910s	1939-1947	0	-	Moved to Lexton FL following 1948 season
Newstead Campbelltown				–	1940	1940	0	-	De-merged into Newstead and Campbelltown in 1947
Patience & Nicholson			Princes Park, Maryborough	–	c.1930s	1937-1949	4	1940, 1945, 1947, 1948	Became the reserve grade side for Maryborough in the Ballarat FL after 1949 season
Primrose		Roses	Princes Park, Maryborough	–	1919	1920-1994	3	1934, 1937, 1984	Folded
Railways			Princes Park, Maryborough	–	1919	1919-1923	3	1912, 1921, 1922	Folded
Railways Institute (Temperance 1913-20)				MJFA	c.1910s	1911-1920, 1934-1940	2	1911, 1936	Moved into the Maryborough Junior FA in 1921. Folded after 1940 season
Redbank Stuart Mill		Reds	Redbank Recreation Reserve, Redbank	–	1956	1956-1958	0	-	Moved to Lexton FL following 1958 season
Royal Park		Tigers	JH Hedges Memorial Park, Maryborough	–	1934	1934-2023	10	1935, 1938, 1967, 1968, 1972, 1973, 1974, 1977, 1981, 1982	Merged with Maryborough Rovers to form Maryborough Giants following 2023 season.
Timor				MJFA	c.1910s	1900, 1913, 1951-1957	2	1900, 1913	Folded after 1957 season

== Football Premierships ==
Seniors

- 1892 Maryborough
- 1893 Maryborough v Bowenvale
- 1894 Maryborough
- 1895-98 ? No Maryborough DFA competition
- 1899 Bowenvale
- 1900 Timor
- 1901 ?
- 1902
- 1903
- 1904 Bristol Hill
- 1905 ?
- 1906
- 1907 Dunolly
- 1908 Maryborough
- 1909 Dunolly
- 1910 Dunolly
- 1911 Temperance
- 1912 Railways
- 1913 Timor
- 1914 Carisbrook
- 1915 Season cancelled in July > WW1
- 1916-18 MDFL in recess > WW1
- 1919 Dunolly
- 1920 Dunolly
- 1921 Railways
- 1922 Railways
- 1923 Bristol Hill
- 1924 Moolort
- 1925 Carisbrook
- 1926 Bristol Hill
- 1927 Bealiba
- 1928 Bealiba
- 1929 Carisbrook
- 1930 Dunolly
- 1931 Primrose
- 1932 Dunolly
- 1933 Dunolly
- 1934 Primrose
- 1935 Royal Park
- 1936 Railways Institute
- 1937 Primrose
- 1938 Royal Park
- 1939 Newstead
- 1940 Patience & Nicholson
- 1941-44 in recess > WW2
- 1945 Patience & Nicholson
- 1946 Maryborough
- 1947 Patience & Nicholson
- 1948 Patience & Nicholson
- 1949 Carisbrook
- 1950 Carisbrook
- 1951 Primrose
- 1952 Maldon
- 1953 Campbells Creek
- 1954 Carisbrook
- 1955 Maldon
- 1956 Maldon
- 1957 Maldon
- 1958 Dunolly
- 1959 Dunolly
- 1960 Carisbrook
- 1961 Dunolly
- 1962 Dunolly
- 1963 Dunolly
- 1964 Carisbrook
- 1965 Talbot
- 1966 Newstead
- 1967 Royal Park
- 1968 Royal Park
- 1969 Dunolly
- 1970 Carisbrook
- 1971 Harcourt
- 1972 Royal Park
- 1973 Royal Park
- 1974 Royal Park
- 1975 Chewton
- 1976 Carisbrook
- 1977 Royal Park
- 1978 Maryborough Rovers
- 1979 Newstead
- 1980 Carisbrook
- 1981 Royal Park
- 1982 Royal Park
- 1983 Maldon
- 1984 Primrose
- 1985 Maldon
- 1986 Chewton
- 1987 Maldon
- 1988 Maldon
- 1989 Talbot
- 1990 Maryborough Rovers
- 1991 Maryborough Rovers
- 1992 Trentham
- 1993 Newstead
- 1994 Trentham
- 1995 Talbot
- 1996 Talbot
- 1997 Talbot
- 1998 Talbot
- 1999 Carisbrook
- 2000 Newstead
- 2001 Talbot
- 2002 Harcourt
- 2003 Harcourt
- 2004 Carisbrook
- 2005 Carisbrook
- 2006 Harcourt
- 2007 Harcourt
- 2008 Carisbrook
- 2009 Newstead
- 2010 Maldon
- 2011 Natte Bealiba
- 2012 Carisbrook
- 2013 Navarre
- 2014 Navarre
- 2015 Navarre
- 2016 Navarre
- 2017 Carisbrook
- 2018 Carisbrook
- 2019 Natte Bealiba
- 2020 In recess > COVID-19
- 2021 1st: Harcourt Shorten season > COVID-19
- 2022 Harcourt
- 2023 Harcourt
- 2024 Natte Bealiba
- 2025 Trentham
- 2026 Harcourt

== League Best and Fairest Awards ==
Senior Football

	MCDFNL Senior Football - Best & Fairest		
Year	Winner	Club	Votes
Taggart Trophy
1908	H Crellin	Bowenvale	
Best & Fairest Cup
1934	J McRae	Royal Park	
Berry Powell Medal
1946	Clarrie Moschetti	Royal Park	votes
1947	Ron Deledio	Dunolly	
1948	Doug Beasy	Dunolly	
1949	Jim Drysdale	Patience & Nicholson	
1950	Ron Deledio	Dunolly	
1951	Jack Older	Primrose	
1952	Don Nicholls	Primrose	
1953	Ray Noonan	Royal Park	
1954	Bill Ebery	Carisbrook	
	Ray Herbert	Campbells Creek	
	Jim Oliver	Primrose	
	Max Watts	Dunolly	
1955	Keith Fyffe	Carisbrook	
1956	Bill Ebery &	Carisbrook	
	Pat Kirk	Primrose	
1957	Arthur Lacey	Dunolly	
1958	Pat Kirk	Primrose	
1959	Arthur Lacey	Dunolly	
1960	Arthur Lacey	Dunolly	
1961	Brian Richardson	Newstead	
1962	Tom Noonan	Royal Park	
1963	Tom Noonan	Royal Park	
1964	Tom Noonan	Royal Park	
1965	Robert Wanlace	Talbot	
1966	Malcom Stevens	Newstead	
1967	Richard Raselli	Dunolly	
1968	Charlie Wallace	Royal Park	
1969	Colin Elliott	Maryborough Rovers	
1970	Ray Allan &	Royal Park	
	Peter Cole	Campbells Creek	
1971	Ray Allan	Royal Park	
1972	Robert Droney	Campbells Creek	
1973	Reg Jones	Chewton	
1974	Wayne Deledio &	Dunolly	
	David Zimmer	Maryborough Rovers	
1975	Laurie Smith	Talbot	
1976	Colin Elliott	Maryborough Rovers	
1977	Neil Robertson	Dunolly	
1978	David Zimmer	Maryborough Rovers	
1979	David Zimmer	Maryborough Rovers	
1980	Paul Williams	Chewton	
1981	Glen Roy	Maldon	
1982	Don Culvenor	Newstead	
1983	Ken Patton	Maldon	
1984	Robert Cribbes	Royal Park	
1985	Mauro Guareschi	Maryborough Rovers	
1986	Anthony O'Shea	Maryborough Rovers	
1987	Steve Denko	Chewton	
1988	Keith Ennis	Trentham	
1989	Keith Ennis	Trentham	
1990	Peter Constable	Carisbrook	
1991	Mauro Guareschi	Maryborough Rovers	
1992	Wayne Purtell	Trentham	
1993	Jason Glanville	Royal Park	
1994	Glenn Skipper	Campbell's Creek	
1995	Michael Pedretti	Newstead	
1996	Peter Egan	Royal Park	
1997	Michael Pedretti	Newstead	
1998	Martin Mark	Carisbrook	
1999	Peter Tardrew	Talbot	
2000	Ryan Morgan	Carisbrook	
2001	Michael Moore	Trentham	
2002	Michael Pedretti	Newstead	
2003	Ian Martin	Talbot	
2004	Daniel Christmas	Newstead	
2005	Nick Robinson	Avoca	
2006	Josh Hutchinson	Harcourt	
2007	Tony Bellenger	Avoca	
2008	Ian Martin	Talbot	
2009	James McNamee	Dunolly	28
2010	Matthew Peake	Campbell's Creek	25
2011	Daniel Parkin	Navarre	28
2012	Paul Chaplin	Harcourt	20
2013	Matt Bilton	Carisbrook	
2014	Damon Aspland	Lexon	34
2015	Michael Dalrmple	Newstead	19
	Hayden Kelly	Maldon	19
	Matthew Smith	Talbot	19
2016	Josh Fowkes	Navarre	18
2017	Jackson Bowen	Carisbrook	24
2018	Matt Bilton	Carisbrook	22
2019	Joel Cowan	Trentham	18
2020	MCDFNL in	recess > COVID-19	
2021	Tommy Horne	Maldon	16
2022	Brayden Frost	Harcourt	27
2023	Joel Cowan	Trentham	27
2024	Damian Wust	Maldon	23
	Joel Cowan*	Trentham	(28)
2025	Jackson Bowen	Carisbrook	26
2026			

- 2024 - Joel Cowan (Trentham) polled the most votes, but was ineligible, due to a round 16 suspension.

Under 15s

	MCDFNL Under 15s Football - Best & Fairest		
Year	Winner	Club	Votes
2026	Billy Rumpff	Carisbrook	35
Best & Fairest Runner Up
2026	Austin Phillips	Harcourt	31

== Leading MCDFNL Goalkicker ==
In 1929, Ned Kick of Dunolly FC kicked 17 goals against Railways to take his goal tally up to 74 goals for the season.

=== Leading Goal Kickers ===
Year	Player	H&A goals	Finals goals	Total Goals
1939	D McDowell (Natte Yallock)	46	0	46
1947	Reuben Allan (Carisbrook)	126	0	126
1956	Keith Hunt (Dunolly)	70	20	90
1957	Keith Hunt (Dunolly)	92	8	100
1958	?			
1959	Keith Hunt (Dunolly)	44	3	47
1960	Keith Hunt (Dunolly)	63	3	66
1961	Geoff Wells (Dunolly)	53	13	66
1962	Keith Hunt (Dunolly)	76	2	78
1963	Doug Nalder (Carisbrook)	38	6	44
1964	Laurie Quinlan (Carisbrook)	45	10	55
1965	Alan Shearer (Carisbrook)	39	0	39
1966	Des Shiel (Royal Park)	69	12	81
1967	Clive Heenan (Dunolly)	50	3	53
1968	Neville Garsed (Newstead)	39	6	45
1969	Charlie Townsing (Dunolly)	89	0	89
1970	Brian Lennen (Royal Park)	100	5	105
1971	Keith Hunt (Dunolly)	89	0	89
1972	Paul Rowe (Campbell Ck)	88	0	88
1973	Brian Lennen (Royal Park)	89	14	103
1974	Brian Lennen (Royal Park)	87	9	96
1975	Peter Woodford (Chewton)	130	15	145
1976	Peter Woodford (Chewton)	115	0	115
1977	Brian Lennen (Royal Park)	115	0	115
1978	Laurie Mason (Carisbrook)	97	17	114
1979	Laurie Mason (Carisbrook)	105	15	120
1980	Gary Schiele ( Chewton)	163	9	172
1981	Max Brown (Carisbrook)	73	0	73
1982	Russell Emmins (Maldon	90	4	94
1983	Greg Pryor (Talbot)	100	16	116
1984	Russell Emmins (Maldon	90	0	90
1985	Geoff Klemick (Chewton)	131	7	138
1986	Geoff Klemick (Chewton)	149	18	167
1987	Darren Rice (Maldon)	100	9	109
1988	Darren Rice (Maldon)	121	8	129
1989	Darren Rice (Maldon)	138	7	145
1990	Leigh Hunt (Carisbrook)	116	0	116
1991	Darren Rice (Maldon)	109	0	109
1992	Leigh Hunt (Carisbrook)	85	0	85
1993	Craig Ginnivion (Newstead)	118	11	129
1994	Cameron McKenzie (Trentham)	74	5	79
1995	Keith Pelham (Trentham)	120	7	127
1996	Keith Pelham (Trentham)	116	14	130
1997	Glen Wills (Maryborough Rovers)	82	0	82
1998	Keith Pelham (Trentham)	71	4	75
1999	Michael Howell (Maldon)	83	0	83
2000	John Hind (Talbot)	63	6	69
2001	Sean Smith (Harcourt)	105	18	123
2002	Shane Field (Carisbrook)	111	0	111
2003	Shane Field (Carisbrook)	100	7	107
2004	Luke Beattie (Trentham)	106	0	106
2005	Todd Featherton (Maryborough Rovers)	84	10	94
2006	Christopher Stone (Harcourt)	139	6	145
2007	Christopher Stone (Harcourt)	91	9	100
2008	Christopher Stone (Harcourt)	99	4	103
2009	Christian Kelly (Maldon)	113	0	113
2010	James Trethowan (Harcourt)	62	0	62
2011	Christian Kelly (Maldon)	127	3	130
2012	Matthew Brown (Lexton)	104	2	106
2013	Nathan Wright (Carisbrook)	86	9	95
2014	Ashley Driscoll (Navarre)	75	9	84
2015	Matthew Brown (Lexton)	78	6	84
2016	Cody Driscoll (Navarre)	73	9	82
2017	Cody Driscoll (Navarre)	72	12	0
2018	Ashley Munari (Carisbrook)	95	10	105
2019	Ashley Munari (Carisbrook)	97	10	107
2020	In recess > COVID-19			
2021	Anthony Zelencich (Carisbrook)	78	0	78
2022	Danny Brewster (Natte Bealiba)	121	10	131
2023	Anthony Zelencich (Carisbrook)	112	6	118
2024	James Regan (Trentham)	72	12	84
2025	James Regan (Trentham)	89	8	97
2026				

== MCDFNL Office Bearers ==
MCDFNL	MCDFNL Office Bearers		
Year	President	Secretary	Treasurer
1946	Perc Outen	Vic Chapman	
1947-52	Frank Lowery	Vic Chapman	
1953-54	M Galvin	Vic Chapman	
1955	M Galvin	Max Harrison	
1956	Ted Graham	Max Harrison	
1957-58	Ted Graham	Gerry O'Callaghan	
1959	Les Crabtree	Gerry O'Callaghan	
1960-61	Lester Haeberle	Gerry O'Callaghan	
1962-64	Jack Scott	Gerry O'Callaghan	
1965-67	Jack Scott	George Jeffs	
1968	Glenn Smith	Ian Harken &	
		Max Martin	
1969	Glenn Smith	Max Martin	
1970-71	Ron Witney	Max Martin	
1972	Peter Ivey	Max Martin	
1973-74	Greg Waters	Max Martin	
1975-77	Ken Hall	Max Martin	
1978-81	Noel Castle	Max Martin	
1982	Esmon Curnow	Max Martin	
1983	Alan Bartley	Max Martin	
1984-88	Bruce Newman	Max Martin	
1989-07	Jock Sellers	Max Martin	
2008-11	Troy Discoll	Ron Ward*	
2012-13	Peter Kerr	Ron Ward*	
2014-16	Stephen Broad	Scott Carey	
2016		Jake Dunne	
2016-17	Stephen Broad	Shane Anwyl	
2018	Stephen Broad	Mitch Tinning	
2019	Stephen Broad	Matt Linsay	
2020	Stephen Broad	Gerard Ryan	
2021	Stephen Broad	Matthew Begbie	
2022			

- Ron Ward: Employed by the MCDFNL / VCFL.

== 2007 Ladder ==
Maryborough Castlemaine	Wins	Byes	Losses	Draws	For	Against	%	Pts
Harcourt	14	0	2	0	2060	1094	188.30%	56
Avoca	13	0	3	0	1951	1016	192.03%	52
Carisbrook	12	0	4	0	1812	1064	170.30%	48
Talbot	11	0	5	0	1804	954	189.10%	44
Maldon	8	0	8	0	1382	1347	102.60%	32
Maryborough Rovers	8	0	8	0	1351	1343	100.60%	32
Newstead	6	0	10	0	1512	1499	100.87%	24
Royal Park	6	0	10	0	1120	1304	85.89%	24
Dunolly	1	0	15	0	845	2513	33.63%	4
Trentham	1	0	15	0	808	2511	32.18%	4

Finals

Final	Team	G	B	Pts	Team	G	B	Pts
Elimination	Talbot	7	13	55	Maryborough Rovers	6	5	41
Qualifying	Avoca	8	13	61	Carisbrook	12	8	80
1st Semi	Avoca	15	10	100	Talbot	12	3	75
2nd Semi	Harcourt	13	14	92	Carisbrook	13	11	89
Preliminary	Avoca	15	8	98	Carisbrook	9	6	60
Grand	Harcourt	21	7	133	Avoca	9	14	68

== 2008 Ladder ==
Maryborough Castlemaine	Wins	Byes	Losses	Draws	For	Against	%	Pts
Carisbrook	16	2	1	1	2216	966	229.40%	74
Maldon	15	2	3	0	2127	1199	177.40%	68
Harcourt	14	2	4	0	2307	1424	162.01%	64
Avoca	13	2	5	0	2239	1172	191.04%	60
Talbot	12	2	5	1	2086	1211	172.25%	58
Maryborough Rovers	9	2	9	0	1784	1439	123.97%	44
Newstead	7	2	11	0	1741	1659	104.94%	36
Dunolly	6	2	12	0	1098	2217	49.53%	32
Trentham	4	2	14	0	1382	2157	64.07%	24
Royal Park	1	2	17	0	900	2422	37.16%	12
Campbells Creek	1	2	17	0	923	2937	31.43%	12

Finals

Final	Team	G	B	Pts	Team	G	B	Pts
Elimination	Avoca	12	4	76	Talbot	6	16	52
Qualifying	Maldon	7	6	48	Harcourt	12	12	84
1st Semi	Maldon	16	10	106	Avoca	8	14	62
2nd Semi	Carisbrook	16	15	111	Harcourt	16	7	103
Preliminary	Maldon	13	19	97	Harcourt	9	13	67
Grand	Carisbrook	16	17	113	Maldon	11	2	68

== 2009 Ladder ==
Maryborough Castlemaine	Wins	Byes	Losses	Draws	For	Against	%	Pts
Avoca	14	2	2	0	1844	900	204.89%	64
Dunolly	13	2	3	0	1969	1030	191.17%	60
Newstead	12	2	4	0	1965	900	218.33%	56
Harcourt	11	2	5	0	1606	1046	153.54%	52
Carisbrook	11	2	5	0	1750	1189	147.18%	52
Maldon	8	2	8	0	1689	1382	122.21%	40
Talbot	8	2	8	0	1499	1313	114.17%	40
Maryborough Rovers	6	2	10	0	1160	1525	76.07%	32
Royal Park	4	2	12	0	828	1913	43.28%	24
Campbells Creek	1	2	15	0	837	2283	36.66%	12
Trentham	0	2	16	0	715	2381	30.03%	8

Finals

Final	Team	G	B	Pts	Team	G	B	Pts
Elimination	Harcourt	16	10	106	Carisbrook	7	9	51
Qualifying	Newstead	12	14	86	Dunolly	9	10	64
1st Semi	Dunolly	16	17	113	Harcourt	14	15	99
2nd Semi	Newstead	12	6	78	Avoca	8	6	54
Preliminary	Dunolly	9	16	70	Avoca	10	9	69
Grand	Newstead	11	16	82	Dunolly	10	13	73

== 2010 Ladder ==
Maryborough Castlemaine	Wins	Byes	Losses	Draws	For	Against	%	Pts
Maldon	14	2	2	0	1969	918	214.49%	64
Avoca	13	2	2	1	1718	858	200.23%	62
Maryborough Rovers	11	2	4	1	1780	1148	155.05%	54
Newstead	11	2	4	1	1676	1116	150.18%	54
Carisbrook	11	2	4	1	1415	1001	141.36%	54
Campbells Creek	10	2	6	0	1414	1524	92.78%	48
Harcourt	5	2	9	2	1287	1493	86.20%	32
Dunolly	5	2	11	0	1207	1673	72.15%	28
Talbot	3	2	13	0	1043	1778	58.66%	20
Trentham	1	2	15	0	1148	1724	66.59%	12
Royal Park	1	2	15	0	688	2112	32.58%	12

Finals

Final	Team	G	B	Pts	Team	G	B	Pts
Elimination	Newstead	8	4	52	Carisbrook	8	8	56
Qualifying	Avoca	12	11	83	Maryborough Rovers	6	2	38
1st Semi	Carisbrook	7	13	55	Maryborough Rovers	8	15	63
2nd Semi	Avoca	16	11	107	Maldon	12	6	78
Preliminary	Maldon	20	13	133	Maryborough Rovers	12	1	73
Grand	Maldon	11	12	78	Avoca	9	11	65

== 2011 Ladder ==
Maryborough Castlemaine	Wins	Byes	Losses	Draws	For	Against	%	Pts
Lexton	15	0	1	0	2050	865	236.99%	60
Carisbrook	13	0	2	1	1830	991	184.66%	54
Navarre	13	0	3	0	1905	835	228.14%	52
Maldon	12	0	4	0	2089	1198	174.37%	48
Natte-Bealiba	11	0	5	0	1746	1046	166.92%	44
Dunolly	8	0	8	0	1815	1426	127.28%	32
Harcourt	8	0	8	0	1558	1297	120.12%	32
Maryborough Rovers	8	0	8	0	1525	1339	113.89%	32
Trentham	8	0	8	0	1613	1552	103.93%	32
Newstead	6	0	9	1	1578	1459	108.16%	26
Avoca	6	0	10	0	1283	1721	74.55%	24
Talbot	2	0	14	0	1088	2203	49.39%	8
Royal Park	1	0	15	0	487	3089	15.77%	4
Campbells Creek	0	0	16	0	1015	2561	39.63%	0

Finals

Final	Team	G	B	Pts	Team	G	B	Pts
Elimination	Dunolly	13	9	87	Harcourt	8	4	52
Elimination	Natte Bealiba	17	23	125	Maryborough Rovers	3	6	24
Qualifying	Carisbrook	14	9	93	Navarre	14	7	91
Qualifying	Lexton	16	10	106	Maldon	9	7	61
Semi	Navarre	8	17	65	Harcourt	5	10	40
Semi	Natte Bealiba	15	9	99	Maldon	12	15	87
Preliminary	Navarre	10	7	67	Lexton	8	11	59
Preliminary	Natte Bealiba	10	7	67	Carisbrook	9	12	66
Grand	Natte Bealiba	12	11	83	Navarre	10	5	65

== 2012 Ladder ==
Maryborough Castlemaine	Wins	Byes	Losses	Draws	For	Against	%	Pts
Lexton	15	0	1	0	2264	541	418.48%	60
Carisbrook	14	0	2	0	1943	843	230.49%	56
Navarre	13	0	3	0	1819	1091	166.73%	52
Maldon	11	0	5	0	2036	1290	157.83%	44
Newstead	11	0	5	0	1752	1222	143.37%	44
Trentham	11	0	5	0	1984	1386	143.15%	44
Natte-Bealiba	10	0	6	0	1505	1079	139.48%	40
Avoca	8	0	8	0	1312	1343	97.69%	32
Maryborough Rovers	6	0	10	0	1060	1652	64.16%	24
Harcourt	4	0	12	0	1169	1609	72.65%	16
Dunolly	4	0	12	0	1181	1747	67.60%	16
Campbells Creek	4	0	12	0	1200	1871	64.14%	16
Talbot	1	0	15	0	986	1655	59.58%	4
Royal Park	0	0	16	0	469	3351	14.00%	0

Finals

Final	Team	G	B	Pts	Team	G	B	Pts
Elimination	Newstead	18	7	115	Avoca	8	8	56
Elimination	Trentham	24	9	153	Natte Bealiba	8	15	63
Qualifying	Carisbrook	11	9	75	Navarre	8	7	55
Qualifying	Maldon	12	8	80	Lexton	11	11	77
Semi	Navarre	15	7	97	Trentham	10	4	64
Semi	Lexton	23	10	148	Newstead	14	7	91
Preliminary	Navarre	13	10	88	Maldon	9	11	65
Preliminary	Carisbrook	13	15	93	Lexton	7	13	55
Grand	Carisbrook	10	9	69	Navarre	6	11	47

== 2013 Ladder ==
Maryborough Castlemaine	Wins	Byes	Losses	Draws	For	Against	%	Pts
Carisbrook	16	0	0	0	2382	539	441.93%	64
Navarre	13	0	3	0	1881	611	307.86%	52
Newstead	12	0	4	0	1784	832	214.42%	48
Lexton	11	0	5	0	1465	828	176.93%	44
Harcourt	11	0	5	0	1446	1333	108.48%	44
Natte-Bealiba	10	0	6	0	1367	915	149.40%	40
Avoca	9	0	7	0	1342	1259	106.59%	36
Maldon	8	0	8	0	1248	1393	89.59%	32
Talbot	8	0	8	0	1007	1284	78.43%	32
Royal Park	4	0	12	0	947	1506	62.88%	16
Campbells Creek	4	0	12	0	1132	2030	55.76%	16
Dunolly	3	0	13	0	934	1754	53.25%	12
Trentham	2	0	14	0	690	1880	37.60%	8
Maryborough Rovers	1	0	15	0	628	2089	30.06%	4

Finals

Final	Date	Team	G	B	Pts	Team	G	B	Pts	
Elimination Final 1	Sun 1 Sep	Maldon	15	11	101	Harcourt	10	11	71	
Elimination Final 2	Sun 1 Sep	Natte Bealiba	16	5	101	Avoca	10	8	68	
Qualifying Final 1	Sat 31 Aug	Carisbrook	23	12	150	Lexton	2	6	18	
Qualifying Final 2	Sat 31 Aug	Newstead	14	12	96	Navarre	10	12	72	
Semi Final 1	Sun 8 Sep	Lexton	18	8	116	Maldon	13	9	87	
Semi Final 2	Sat 7 Sep	Navarre	15	11	101	Natte Bealiba	10	9	69	
Preliminary Final 1	Sat 14 Sep	Navarre	13	12	90	Carisbrook	13	8	86	
Preliminary Final 2	Sun 15 Sep	Lexton	15	13	103	Newstead	13	15	93	
Grand Final	Sun 22 Sep	Navarre	19	13	127	Lexton	4	2	26	AFL Victoria Country Medal: Ben Scott (Navarre)

Match Report

Navarre are the 2013 Bendigo Bank Maryborough Castlemaine District Football Netball League Premiers after dominating Lexton to win by a massive 100 points in front of the second biggest Grand Final crowd ever at Princes Park on Sunday.

The Grasshoppers were not to be denied in their third successive Grand Final and their desperation from the opening bounce was evident as they led the Tigers to the ball at every opportunity, and used the ball with precision to allow free flowing scoring for the Navarre forwards while Lexton struggled to have any forward entries at all.

Ash Driscoll scored three goals in the opening term while Daniel Parkin was allowed to get loose on many occasions and made the most of his freedom. Parkin returned for the Grand Final from a broken jaw and was wearing protective headgear, but it had no ill effects on the Grasshoppers coach as he continually racked up possessions. Navarre led at the first change by 31 points. 5.2.(32) to 0.1.(1)

The first term was the template for the remainder of the game. Lexton tried hard but they had little influence on the scoreboard Star forward Matt Brown finally broke through for a goal at the nine-minute mark of the second term, but had to shoot from tight on the boundary as the Navarre defence led by Brent Flood and Bryce Tickner was holding up to any attacking moves by the Tigers.

Ben Scott had a remarkable final series and once again had a day out and was the recipient of the AFL Victoria Country medal for Best player on the ground. Scott kicked two of his five goals in the second term and led the way for the Navarre running brigade as did Josh Driscoll who was judged to be Navarre’s best player by the Grasshoppers hierarchy. Aiden Lee was also under notice and received the MCDFNL medal for his performance.

With the game being well and truly over at half time, Lexton still tried valiantly but could not make inroads on the scoreboard, as the Grasshoppers finished strongly in the final term with an avalanche of scoring shots which produced goals to numerous players including three to Sam Robertson who took some strong contested pack marks and kicked truly for the Grasshoppers to snare the 2013 Premiership, winning 19.12.126 to Lexton's 4.2.26

Lexton’s better players were Jimmy Templeton, Mick Jennings and Lewis Alexopolous, but it was a day the Tigers would rather forget with four teams (senior football and A, B & C Grade netball) in on the day and all suffered losses.

It was a memorable day for Navarre as their A Grade netball team, much like the Senior footballers, finally broke through for their first ever MCDFNL premiership on their third attempt, vanquishing the demons from twelve months prior after besting 2012 conqueror Lexton by 13 goals, winning 54–41 with Lauren Armstrong awarded the best on court medal.

== 2014 Ladder ==
Maryborough Castlemaine	Wins	Byes	Losses	Draws	For	Against	%	Pts
Navarre	16	0	0	0	2080	679	306.33%	64
Lexton	15	0	1	0	1618	667	242.58%	60
Carisbrook	13	0	3	0	1573	837	187.93%	52
Natte-Bealiba	12	0	4	0	1542	987	156.23%	48
Newstead	12	0	4	0	1422	1120	126.96%	48
Royal Park	11	0	5	0	1169	1073	108.95%	44
Campbells Creek	7	0	9	0	1159	1468	78.95%	28
Talbot	6	0	10	0	1314	1362	96.48%	24
Harcourt	5	0	11	0	1140	1432	79.61%	20
Maryborough Rovers	4	0	12	0	1043	1589	65.64%	16
Trentham	3	0	12	1	981	1588	61.78%	14
Avoca	3	0	13	0	942	1623	58.04%	12
Maldon	3	0	13	0	913	1691	53.99%	12
Dunolly	1	0	14	1	853	1633	52.24%	6

Finals

Final	Date	Team	G	B	Pts	Team	G	B	Pts	
Elimination Final 1	Sun 31 Aug	Newstead	15	16	106	Talbot	13	6	84	
Elimination Final 2	Sun 31 Aug	Royal Park	12	14	86	Campbells Creek	6	13	49	
Qualifying Final 1	Sat 30 Aug	Navarre	13	11	89	Natte Bealiba	11	6	72	
Qualifying Final 2	Sat 30 Aug	Lexton	9	7	61	Carisbrook	10	9	69	
Semi Final 1	Sun 7 Sep	Natte Bealiba	12	17	89	Newstead	9	11	65	
Semi Final 2	Sat 6 Sep	Lexton	17	6	108	Royal Park	10	5	65	
Preliminary Final 1	Sat 13 Sep	Navarre	13	9	87	Lexton	12	8	80	
Preliminary Final 2	Sun 14 Sep	Carisbrook	12	14	86	Natte Bealiba	9	14	68	
Grand Final	Sun 21 Sep	Navarre	16	21	117	Carisbrook	9	8	62	AFL Victoria Country Medal: Ben Scott (Navarre)

Match Report

Navarre overcame a slow start in Sunday’s Maryborough-Castlemaine District Football League grand final before powering away from Carisbrook to win by 55 points at Princes Park.

The 16.21 (117) to 9.8 (62) victory capped a double for the MCDFL’s latest power side, with back-to-back flags and an undefeated 2014 season. “This is probably sweeter than last year” Navarre coach Daniel Parkin said. “Back-to-back is hard to do, but to have also done it undefeated this year is unbelievable.”

While the final result was a 55-point win to Navarre, there were anxious moments early for the Grasshoppers. The Grasshoppers kicked the opening goal of the game through Cody Driscoll, but that would be their only major of the first term.

Through the Grasshoppers’ previous 18 games this year, no side had led them by more than 10 points at any of the quarter breaks. But by quarter-time they were 20 points down after the Redbacks had the better of the first term. The Redbacks had nine scoring shots to four to lead 4.5 to 1.3 at quarter-time. Jackson Bowen, Liam Cunningham, Matthew Bilton and Cole Roscholler all kicked first-term goals for the Redbacks. But the 20-point quarter-time lead should have been more after the Redbacks squandered several gettable set-shots.

However, the Grasshoppers were quick to respond to the challenge in the second term. With the midfield led by Josh Driscoll, Ben Scott, Sam Kaye and captain Louis Hannett getting on top, the Grasshoppers surged back. Navarre kicked 5.3 to 1.1 in the second term, with a goal to Kris Brennan with the last kick of the quarter giving the Grasshoppers a six-point lead at half-time, 6.6 to 5.6.

And that momentum the Grasshoppers built in the second term continued into the third quarter as they blew the game open. The Grasshoppers’ domination of possession in the third term was highlighted in the 15-4 inside 50 count in their favour, while they kicked 5.8 to 1.1. To that stage since quarter-time, the Grasshoppers had kicked 10.11 to 2.2, had 30 inside 50s to 13 and 10 centre breaks to three. Leading by 37 points at three quarter-time, the Grasshoppers finished off with five goals to three in the final term.

All three of Carisbrook’s last-quarter goals were kicked by Cunningham, who earned the MCDFL best on ground medal for his effort in kicking six of the Redbacks’ nine goals for the match. His sixth goal was a sensational kick under pressure from the boundary in the scoreboard pocket.

The AFL Victoria Country Medal was won by Navarre’s Scott, who was also a best-on-ground medallist in last year’s 101-point grand final win over Lexton.

Others in the best were Daniel Reading, forward Kris Brennan (four goals), Hannett, the dashing Bryce Tickner and Josh Driscoll. As well as Brennan, full-forward Ashley Driscoll also kicked four goals to take his season tally to 84.

Carisbrook’s best were ruckman Bowen, Cunningham - who finished the year with 82 goals - defenders Andrew Lovett and Nathan O’Keefe, along with Jakob Tidyman and wingman Hayden Barby. “We started well and controlled the footy early, but to Navarre’s credit, they were just too good for us,” outgoing Carisbrook coach Luke Treacy said.

As well as the seniors, Navarre also won the A-grade netball for the second year in a row, too. "

== 2015 Ladder ==
Maryborough Castlemaine	Wins	Losses	Draws	For	Against	%	Pts
Navarre	16	0	0	1974	650	303.69%	64
Carisbrook	14	2	0	1835	854	214.87%	56
Lexton	14	2	0	1752	906	193.38%	56
Natte-Bealiba	12	4	0	1516	983	154.22%	48
Harcourt	10	6	0	1560	1313	118.81%	40
Royal Park	9	7	0	1503	1108	135.65%	36
Talbot	6	10	0	1200	1318	91.05%	24
Campbells Creek	6	10	0	1222	1475	82.85%	24
Maryborough Rovers	6	10	0	1250	1642	76.13%	24
Avoca	5	11	0	1070	1618	66.13%	20
Newstead	5	11	0	927	1558	59.50%	20
Trentham	4	12	0	974	1462	66.62%	16
Maldon	4	12	0	969	1701	56.97%	16
Dunolly	1	15	0	737	1901	38.77%	4

Finals

Final	Date	Team	G	B	Pts	Team	G	B	Pts
Qualifying Final 1	Sat 29 Aug	Navarre	14	12	96	Natte Bealiba	8	1	49
Qualifying Final 2	Sat 29 Aug	Carisbrook	10	14	74	Lexton	9	8	62
Elimination Final 1	Sun 30 Aug	Harcourt	18	16	121	Campbells Creek	7	8	50
Elimination Final 2	Sun 30 Aug	Royal Park	14	13	97	Talbot	11	5	71
Semi Final 2	Sat 5 Sep	Lexton	9	14	68	Royal Park	6	13	49
Semi Final 1	Sun 6 Sep	Natte Bealiba	12	11	83	Harcourt	6	10	46
Preliminary Final 1	Sat 12 Sep	Navarre	17	7	109	Lexton	8	12	60
Preliminary Final 2	Sun 13 Sep	Carisbrook	16	18	114	Natte Bealiba	13	7	85
Grand Final	Sun 20 Sep	Navarre	17	14	116	Carisbrook	8	7	55

Match Report

"Navarre has won their third successive premiership in the Bendigo Bank Maryborough Castlemaine District Football Netball League after a convincing 51 point victory over Carisbrook in the 2015 MCDFNL Grand Final

It was an opening term blitz that set up the victory as Navarre dominated at the centre bounce and took a stranglehold on possession denying the Redbacks the ball and restricting their scoring opportunities as the Grasshopper defence only allowed three entries into the forward fifty in the opening term. Mitch Whelan was the Redbacks only goal scorer when he marked a pass from Joel Riske, but this was to be their only score for the term. With Navarre having so much off the ball, the Carisbrook defence was under extreme pressure as the Grasshoppers shared the ball around amongst six different goal scorers for the quarter to take a 33 point lead into quarter time.

Carisbrook overcame their first quarter jitters and started to gain a lot more possession of the ball and had five shots on goal in succession, but inaccuracy was costly as they could only score two goals through Brady Neil and Nathan Wright. But any inroads they made into reducing the margin was nullified late in the quarter, when Jesse Hannett produced an outstanding piece of play when he bounced out of a pack of Redbacks and snapped a miraculous snap from the boundary on his left foot, and this was quickly followed by a goal to the MCDFNL Grand Final Medallist in Cody Driscoll who also threaded a goal from the same spot that Hannett had goaled from.

Driscoll goaled again on the siren as the Grasshoppers led by 45 points at half time.

Carisbrook was inspired by an incredible checkside goal from Mitch Whelan half way through the third term and this was followed by three more goals for the Redbacks through Nathan and Nick Wright and Brady Neil as they mounted as comeback and were able to win the term and reduced the margin to just 30 points going into the final term and with the momentum swinging their way, would have been confident of finishing the game strongly.

However, a left foot snap from Cody Driscoll from the first forward entry of the final quarter put to rest any chance of a Carisbrook revival, and then the high flying forward made sure of the victory when he took a very strong pack mark and kicked the sealer just a minute later. From this point in the game, Navarre coasted to victory knowing that they had the premiership cup in its keeping and the fifty one point victory gave the Grasshoppers their third premiership in succession and 41st consecutive senior victory.

It was an all-round performance from Navarre with every player contributing, but it was Daniel Parkin and Louis Hannett’s attack on the ball that was a key for the Grasshoppers victory, while being supported by the three Driscoll Brothers, with Cody kicking five goals and Ash booting four goals, and Josh providing a lot of drive on the wing on his way to winning the AFL Victoria Country Medal.

With the ball being in Navarre’s forward line for the majority of the game, Carisbrook defenders Kurt Bruechert and Adam Hurse were key players for the Redbacks, and were supported by Brady Neil, Jakob Tidyman and Mitch Whelan. "

== 2016 Ladder ==
In round 9 (26 June 2016), Navarre defeated Natte-Bealiba for its 50th consecutive victory.,

Maryborough Castlemaine	Wins	Losses	Draws	For	Against	%	Pts
Royal Park	15	1	0	1808	855	211.46%	60
Navarre	14	2	0	1849	681	271.51%	56
Natte Bealiba	14	2	0	1693	968	174.90%	56
Carisbrook	13	3	0	1835	730	251.37%	52
Talbot	9	7	0	1314	1268	103.63%	36
Newstead	8	8	0	1505	1332	112.99%	32
Lexton	8	8	0	1143	1383	82.65%	32
Trentham	7	9	0	1356	1289	105.20%	28
Dunolly	7	9	0	1336	1580	84.56%	28
Harcourt	5	11	0	1177	1482	79.42%	20
Maryborough Rovers	5	11	0	1042	1716	60.72%	20
Avoca	3	13	0	1188	1884	63.06%	12
Campbells Creek	3	13	0	954	1667	57.23%	12
Maldon	1	15	0	886	2251	39.36%	4

Finals

Final	Date	Team	G	B	Pts	Team	G	B	Pts
Qualifying Final 1	Sat 27 Aug	Royal Park	4	5	29	Carisbrook	12	13	85
Qualifying Final 2	Sat 27 Aug	Navarre	14	22	106	Natte Bealiba	1	4	10
Elimination Final 1	Sun 28 Aug	Talbot	17	3	105	Trentham	14	5	89
Elimination Final 2	Sun 28 Aug	Newstead	10	6	66	Lexton	8	10	58
Semi Final 1	Sat 3 Sep	Royal Park	16	23	119	Talbot	6	1	37
Semi Final 2	Sun 4 Sep	Natte Bealiba	14	5	89	Newstead	7	7	49
Preliminary Final 1	Sat 10 Sep	Carisbrook	17	19	121	Natte Bealiba	5	2	32
Preliminary Final 2	Sun 11 Sep	Navarre	15	10	100	Royal Park	7	6	48
Grand Final	Sun 18 Sep	Carisbrook	4	7	31	Navarre	10	12	72

== 2017 Ladder ==
Maryborough Castlemaine	Wins	Losses	Draws	For	Against	%	Pts
Navarre	15	1	0	1891	635	297.80%	60
Carisbrook	14	2	0	1916	770	248.83%	56
Natte Bealiba	13	3	0	1962	720	272.50%	52
Harcourt	12	4	0	1594	1059	150.52%	48
Royal Park	10	6	0	1441	1169	123.27%	40
Talbot	10	6	0	1446	1246	116.05%	40
Trentham	9	7	0	1581	1027	153.94%	36
Maryborough Rovers	8	8	0	1537	1173	131.03%	32
Newstead	7	9	0	1138	1332	85.44%	28
Lexton	5	11	0	1106	1327	83.35%	20
Maldon	4	12	0	692	2179	31.76%	16
Avoca	2	14	0	986	1762	55.96%	8
Campbells Creek	2	14	0	880	2095	42.00%	8
Dunolly	1	15	0	649	2325	27.91%	4

Finals

Final	Date	Team	G	B	Pts	Team	G	B	Pts
Qualifying Final 1	Sat 26 Aug	Navarre	22	10	142	Harcourt	5	7	37
Qualifying Final 2	Sat 26 Aug	Carisbrook	15	14	104	Natte Bealiba	6	9	45
Elimination Final 1	Sun 27 Aug	Royal Park	14	13	97	Maryborough Rovers	5	5	35
Elimination Final 2	Sun 27 Aug	Talbot	13	10	88	Trentham	9	8	62
Semi Final 1	Sat 2 Sep	Harcourt	11	11	77	Royal Park	15	10	100
Semi Final 2	Sun 3 Sep	Natte Bealiba	15	6	96	Talbot	12	9	81
Preliminary Final 1	Sat 9 Sep	Navarre	16	10	106	Natte Bealiba	2	14	26
Preliminary Final 2	Sun 10 Sep	Carisbrook	18	22	130	Royal Park	3	5	23
Grand Final	Sat 16 Sep	Navarre	7	11	53	Carisbrook	11	7	73

== See also ==
- Campbells Creek vs Primrose (1990 MCDFL season)

== Books ==
History of Football in the Bendigo District – John Stoward – ISBN 978-0-9805929-1-7
