= Jim Baxter (Australian footballer) =

Australian rules footballer

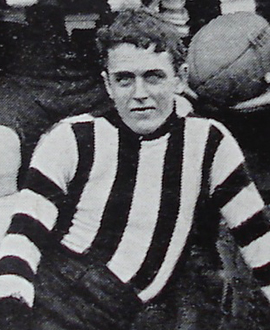
- Baxter during his Collingwood career

Personal information
- Full name: James Robert Baxter
- Born: 8 October 1887; Maldon, Victoria
- Died: 22 April 1952 (aged 64); Tongala, Victoria
- Original team: Maldon
- Height: 168 cm (5 ft 6 in)
- Weight: 70 kg (154 lb)

Playing career^{1}
Years	Club	Games (Goals)
1907–09	Collingwood	4 (1)
1910–14	Footscray (VFA)	80 (80)
- ^{1} Playing statistics correct to the end of 1909.

James Robert Baxter (8 October 1887 – 22 April 1952) was an Australian rules footballer who played with Collingwood in the Victorian Football League (VFL) and Footscray in the Victorian Football Association (VFA).

Baxter later served in the Australian Army during World War I.

== Death ==
James Baxter died in April 1952 as a result of a fall into an empty coal bunker at the Tongala Milk Products factory where he was employed. The Coroner's inquest into his death was unable to determine the cause of his fall.
