= Reg Seedsman =

Australian rules footballer

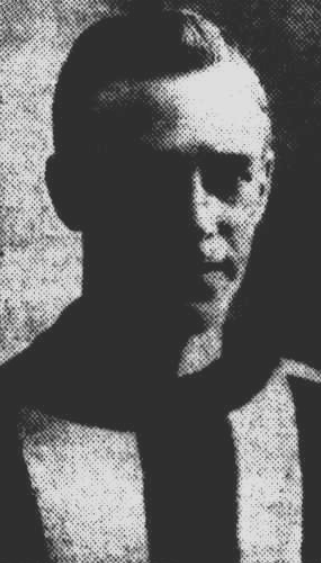

Personal information
- Full name: Reginald Walter Seedsman
- Born: 10 November 1895; Albert Park, Victoria
- Died: 2 March 1983 (aged 87); South Australia

Playing career^{1}
Years	Club	Games (Goals)
1920–21	South Melbourne	31 (0)
- ^{1} Playing statistics correct to the end of 1921.

Reginald Walter Seedsman (10 November 1895 – 2 March 1983) was an Australian rules footballer who played with South Melbourne in the Victorian Football League (VFL).
