= Les Murray (footballer) =

Australian rules footballer

Personal information
- Full name: Les Murray
- Born: 27 September 1928
- Died: 27 May 1999 (aged 70)
- Original team: Maldon
- Height: 183 cm (6 ft 0 in)
- Weight: 78 kg (172 lb)

Playing career^{1}
Years	Club	Games (Goals)
1951	Footscray	11 (6)
- ^{1} Playing statistics correct to the end of 1951.

Les Murray (27 September 1928 – 27 May 1999) was an Australian rules footballer who played with Footscray in the Victorian Football League (VFL).

Murray kicked 100 goals for Maldon in 1950, prior to playing with Footscray.
