= Chewton, Victoria =

Chewton
- Town
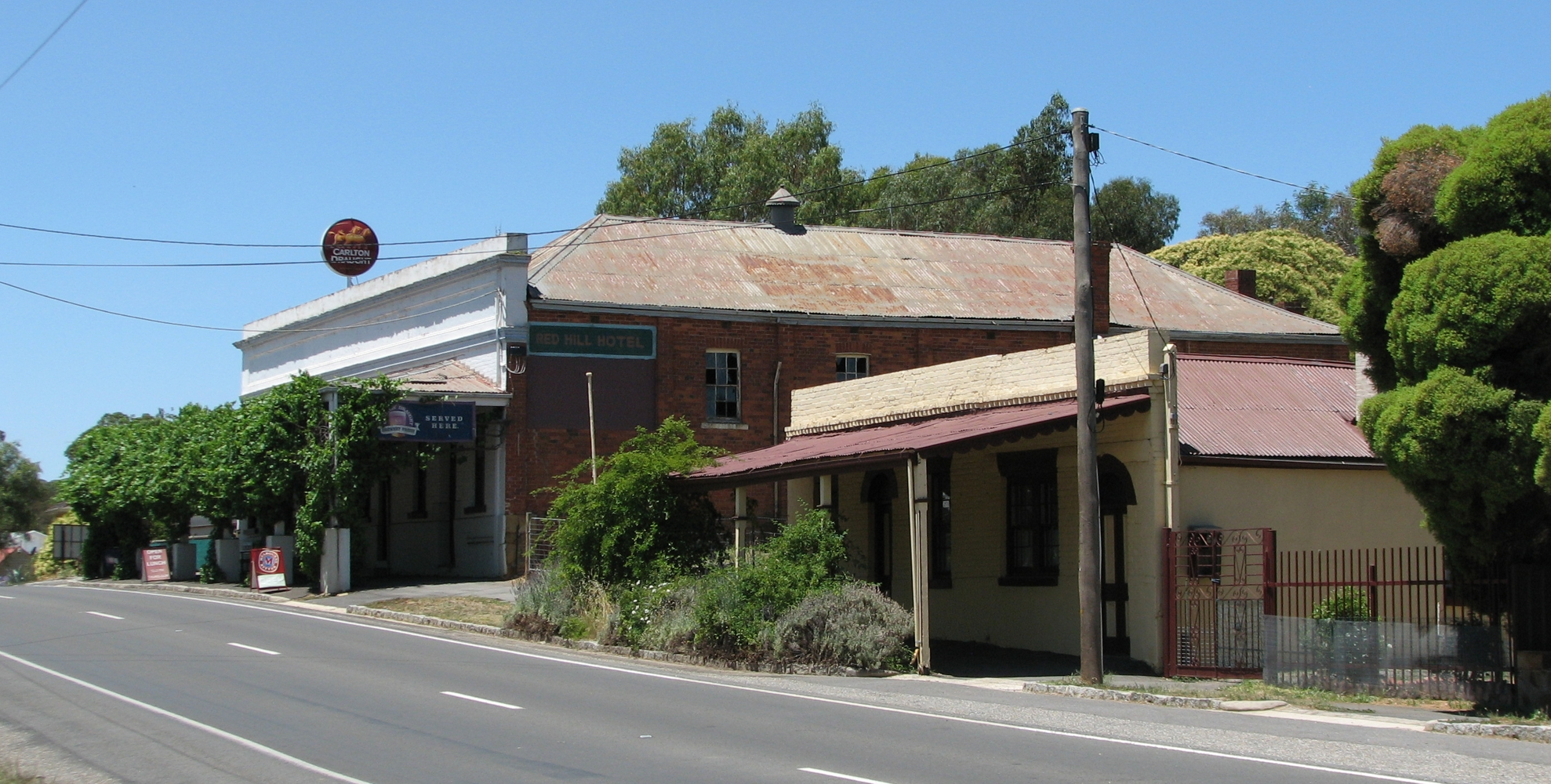
- View towards Red Hill Hotel

- Coordinates: 37°05′0″S 144°16′0″E
- Country: Australia
- State: Victoria
- LGA: Shire of Mount Alexander
- Location: 116 km (72 mi) north west of Melbourne; 42 km (26 mi) S of Bendigo; 5 km (3.1 mi) E of Castlemaine

Government
  - State electorate: Bendigo West
  - Federal division: Bendigo

Population
  - Total: 763 (2021 census)
- Time zone: UTC+10 (AEST)
  - Summer (DST): UTC+11 (AEST)
- Postcode: 3451

Chewton is a town in Mount Alexander Shire, Victoria, Australia, 116 kilometres north west of the state capital, Melbourne. At the 2021 census, Chewton had a population of 763.

== History ==
Prior to European settlement, the Chewton area was inhabited by the Dja Dja Wurrung Aboriginal people, part of the Kulin nation. The first European in the area was the explorer Major Thomas Mitchell on his way to discovering what he termed "Australia Felix" in 1836–37. Not long after, a sheep station was established by William Campbell, which incorporated the current townsite.

Gold was discovered by shepherds on Dr Barker's sheep run at nearby Barkers Creek in 1851, spawning a large gold rush. Over 30,000 diggers arrived at Chewton within three months, soon followed by prospectors from around the world, including many Chinese. The town was surveyed in 1854 with land lots being sold the following year (1855).

Chewton Post Office opened on 8 September 1857. A Forrest Creek Post Office had opened in 1852, which was replaced by Castlemaine in 1854. The Red Hill Hotel, constructed in 1854 is still standing today. In 1862 a branch of the Oriental Bank opened in Chewton with Alexander Kerr as the first manager.

By the 1860s the alluvial gold had been exhausted and efforts turned to underground shafts in search of gold bearing quartz reefs. Underground mining saw the immigration of Welsh and Cornish miners and some mines were very successful. The Wattle Gully mine founded in 1876 is still operating today. As gold mining wound down, the population declined to 1,212 in 1891 and 454 in 1933.

The stonework supports of the Garfield water wheel lie near Chewton.

While close to Castlemaine the town still maintains a distinct identity, but is slowly becoming a suburb of greater Castlemaine. Several historical buildings and sites, including the Chewton Town Hall (constructed in 1858) and the Post office (constructed in 1879) are now owned by the Chewton Domain Society, a community group established to manage the properties. The society also produces a monthly community newsletter. For several years, Chewton was host to a folk music festival over the Australia Day long weekend. In 2007, the festival relocated to nearby Newstead.

The former railway station at Chewton closed to all traffic on 16 June 1976.

Chewton Football Club was established in 1884 and played in the Castlemaine District Football League. They won premierships in 1938 and 1948.

== Gallery ==
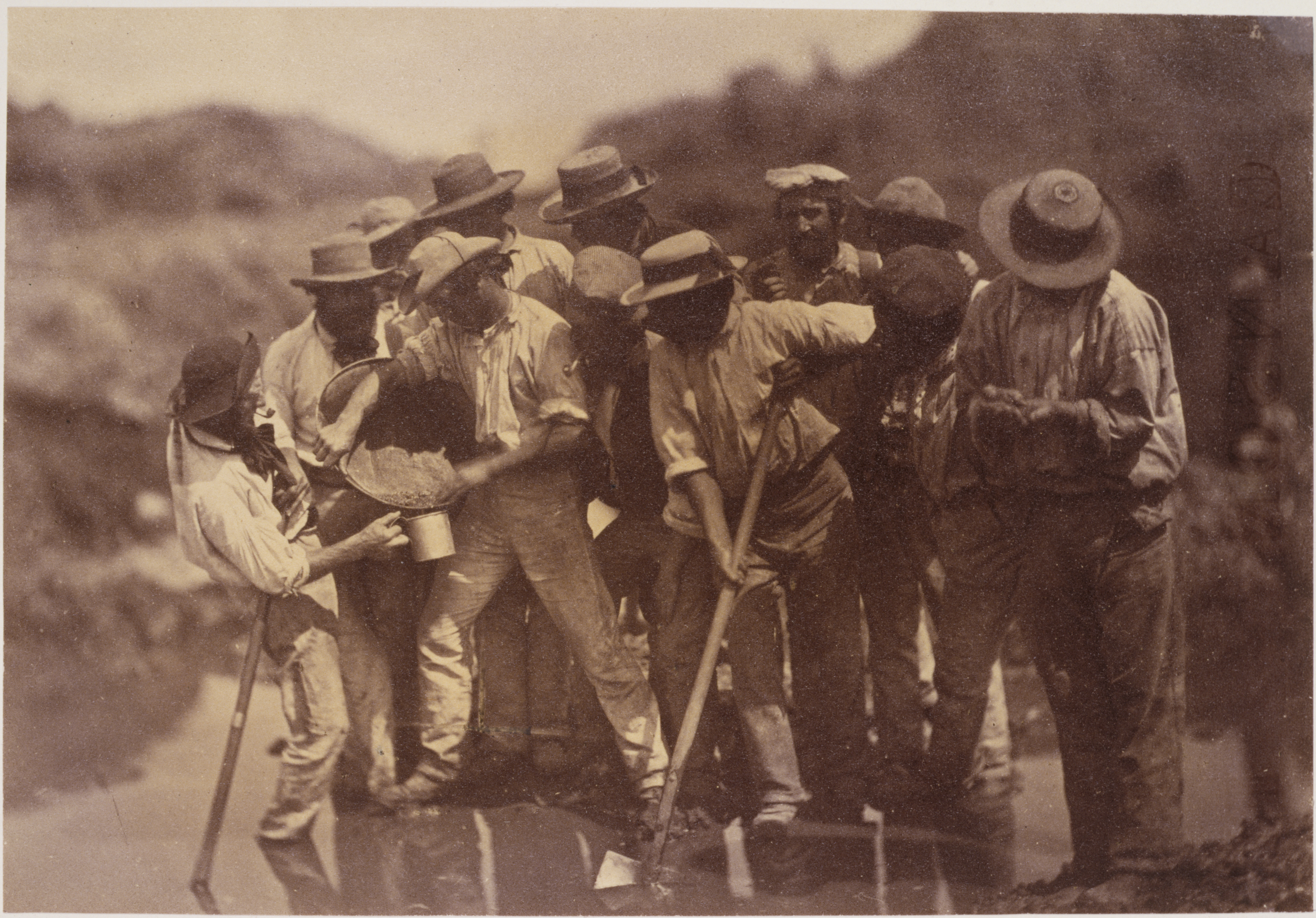
Richard Daintree and Antoine Fauchery (circa 1858) A gang of diggers at Forrest Creek, Chewton

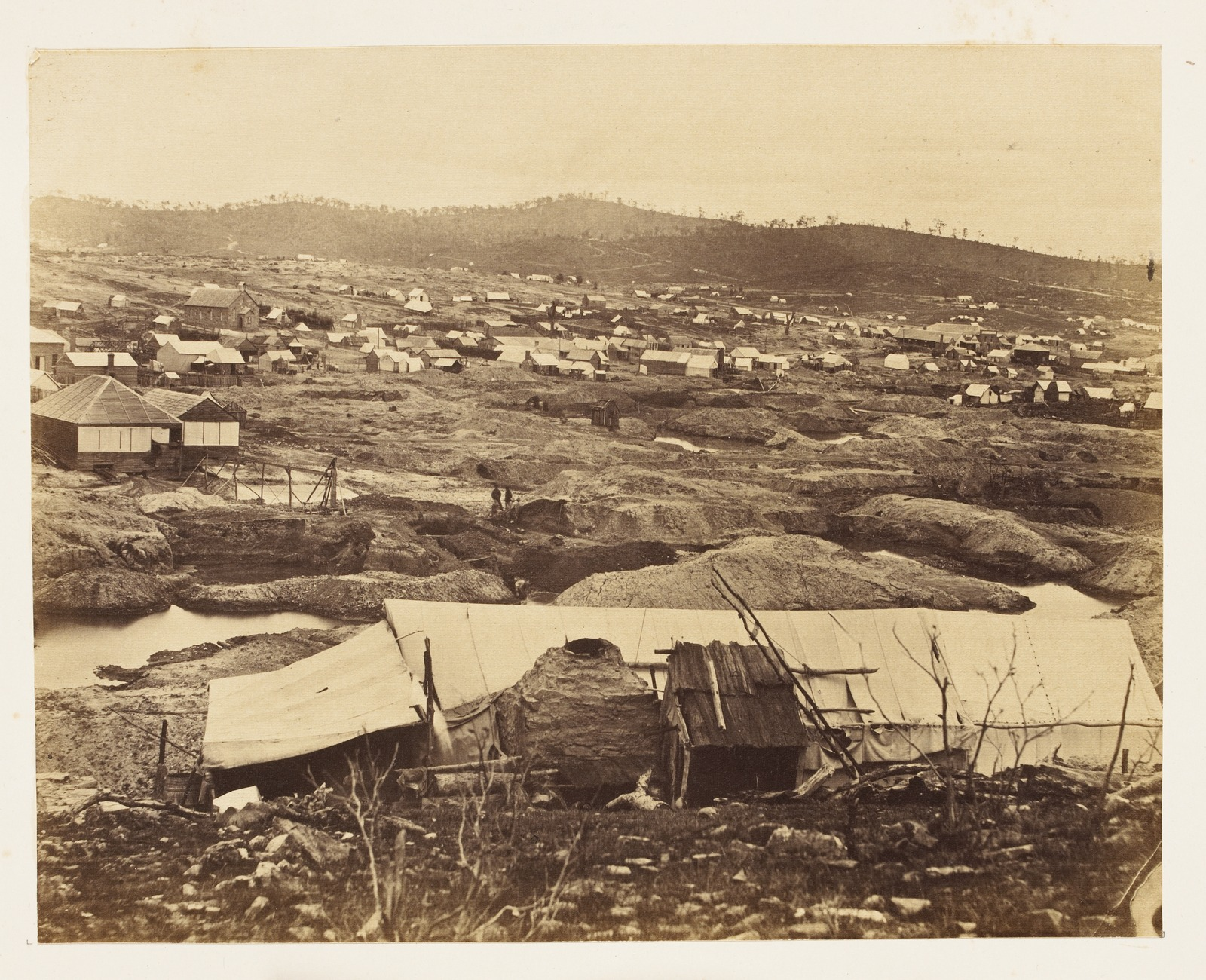
Richard Daintree, Castlemaine gold diggings on 15 January 1858, Forrest Creek

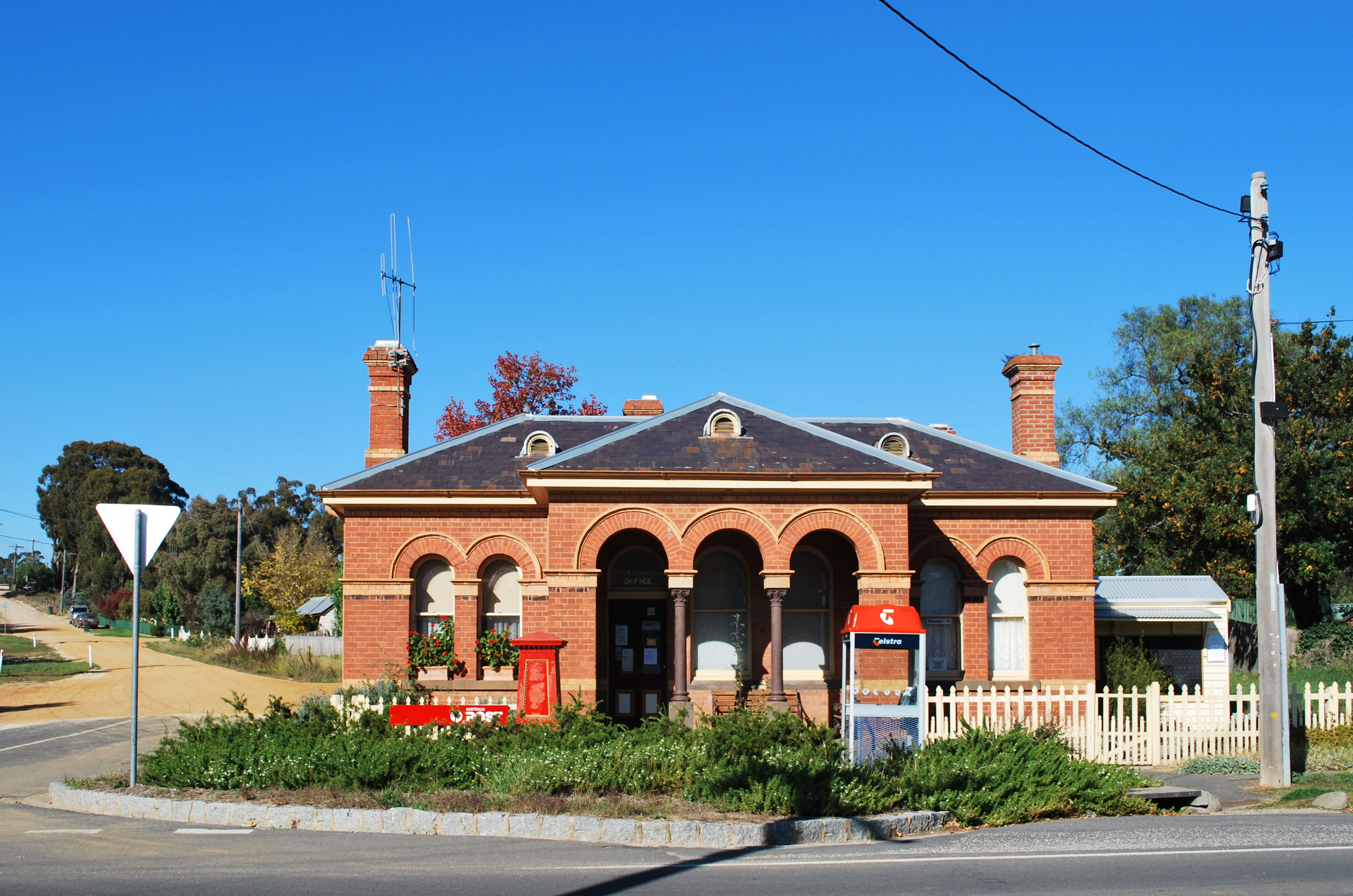

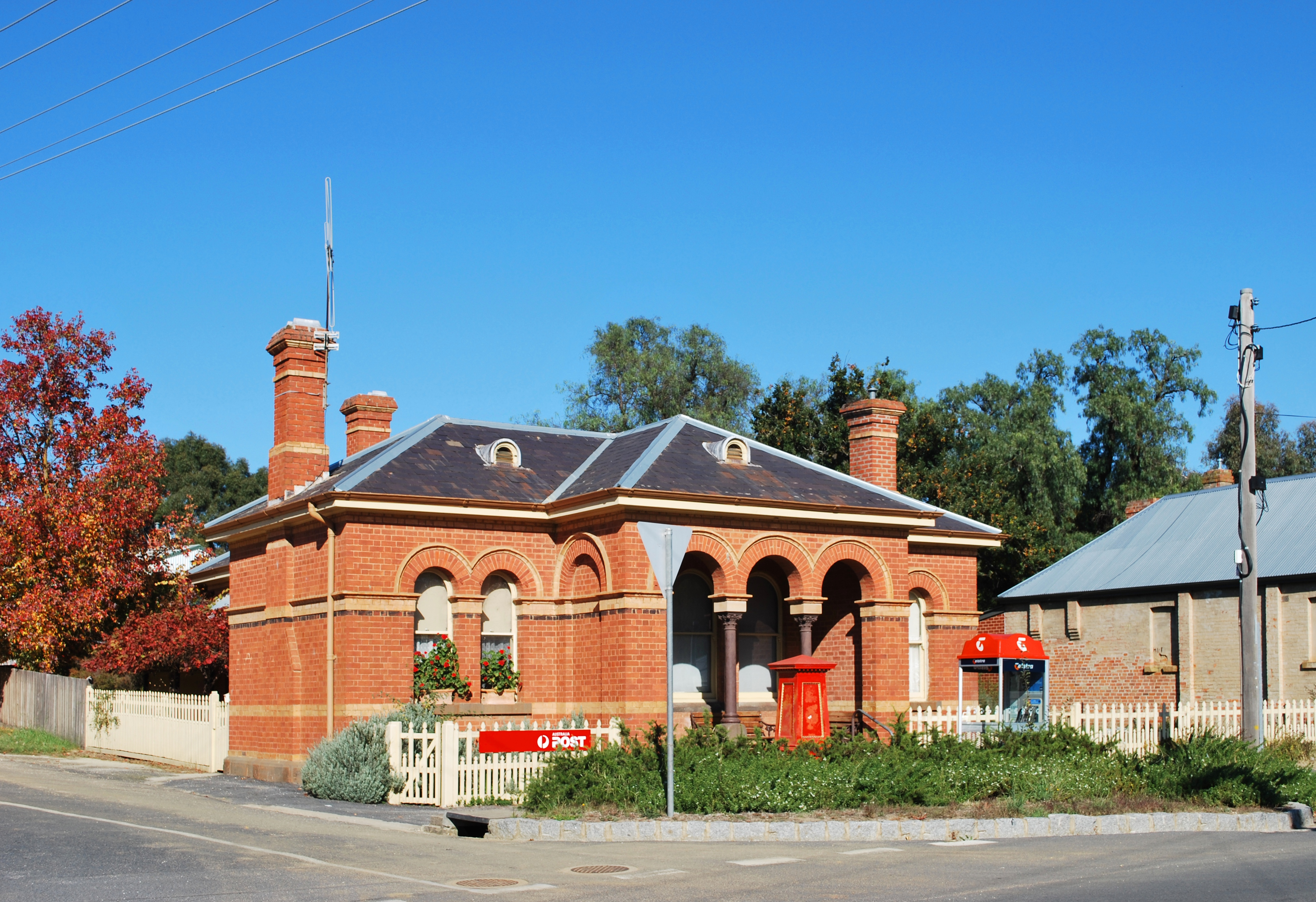

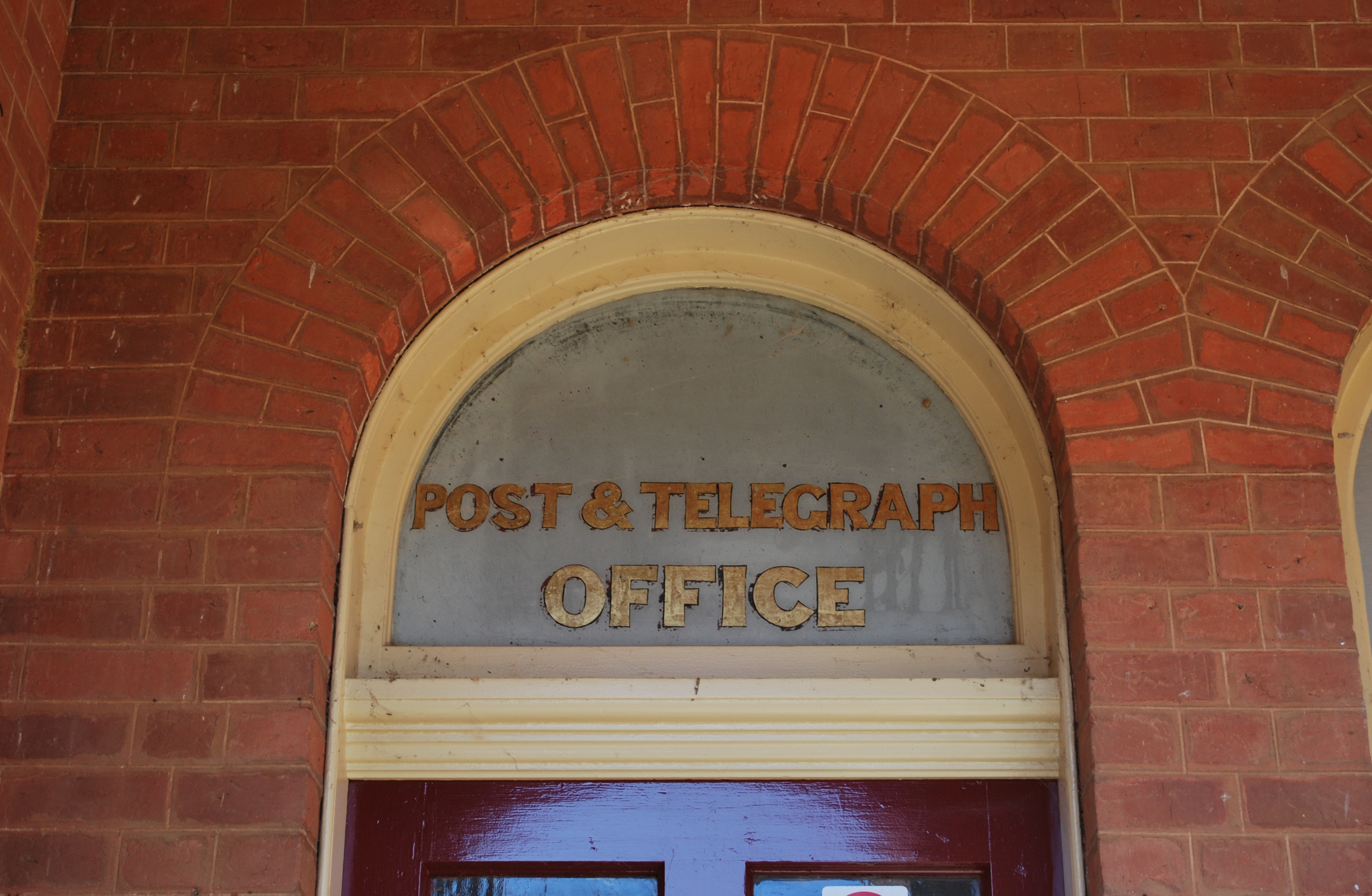

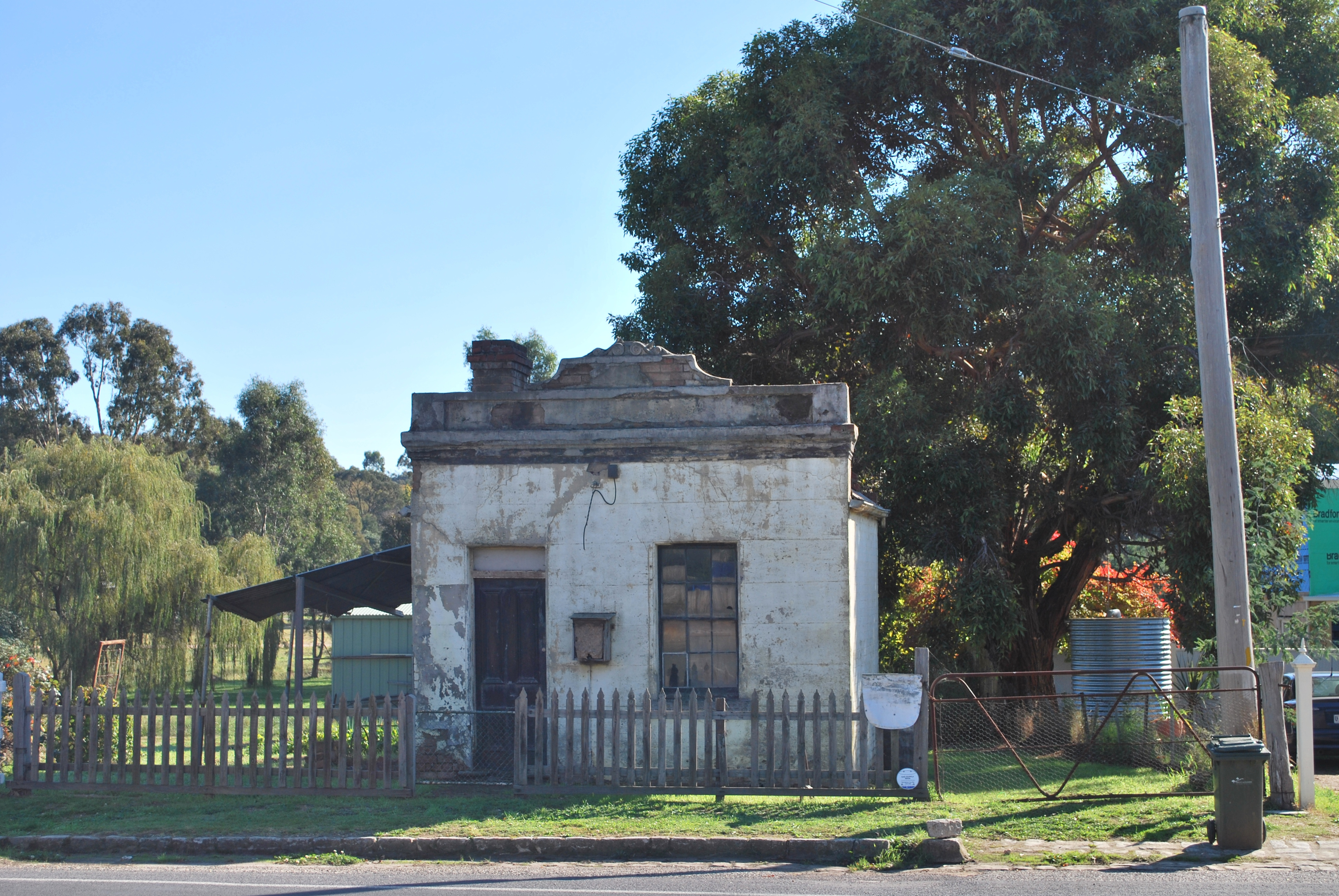

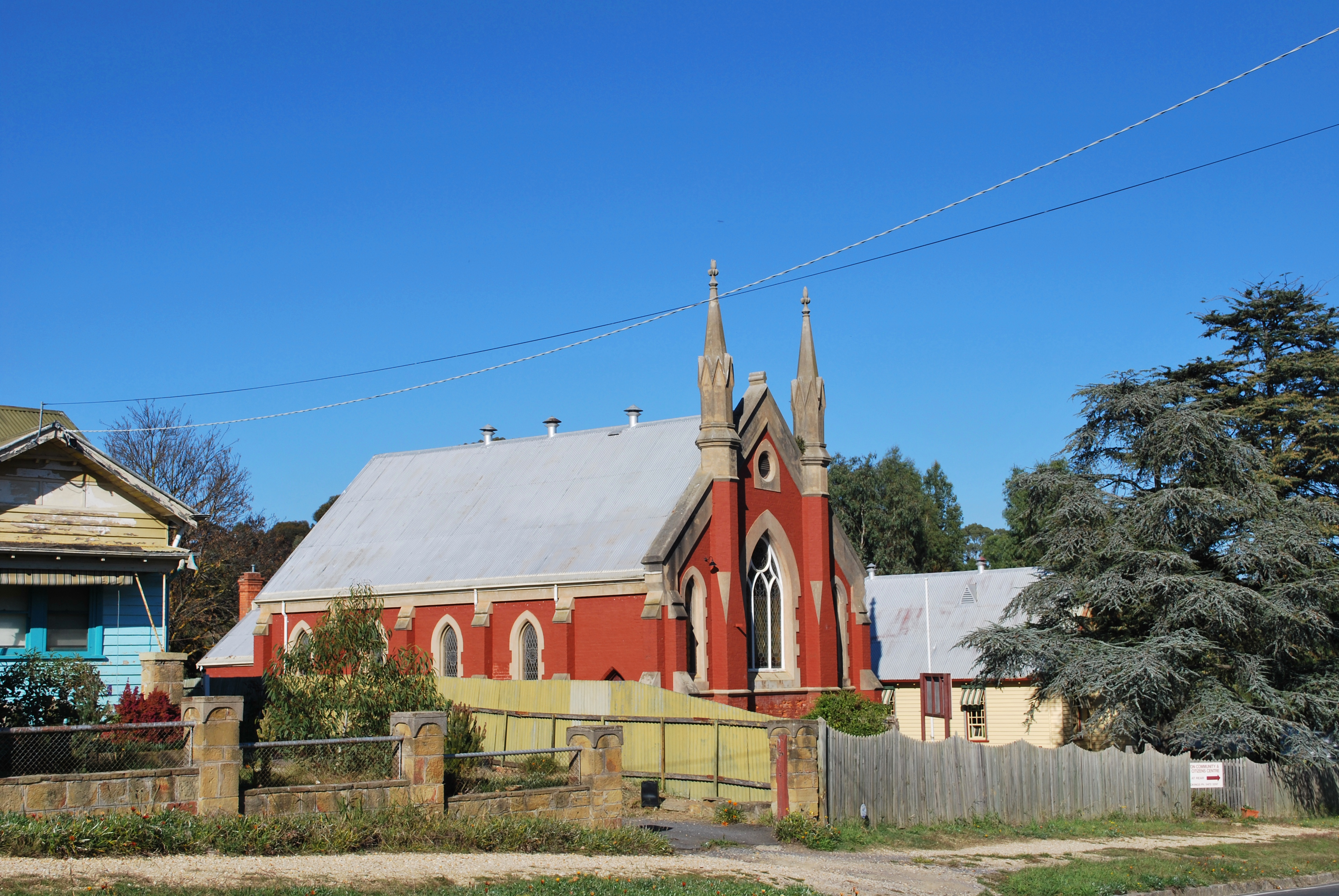

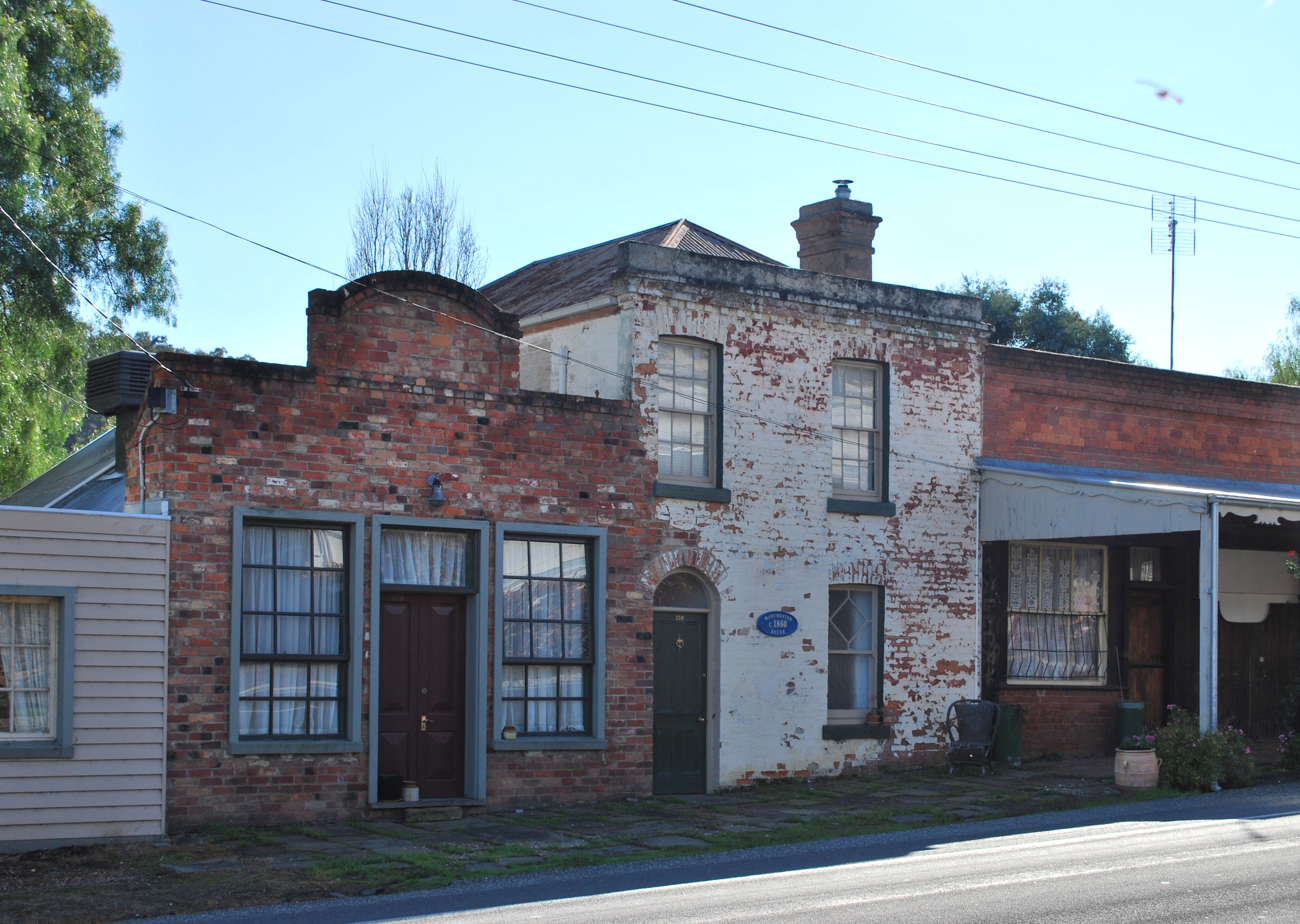

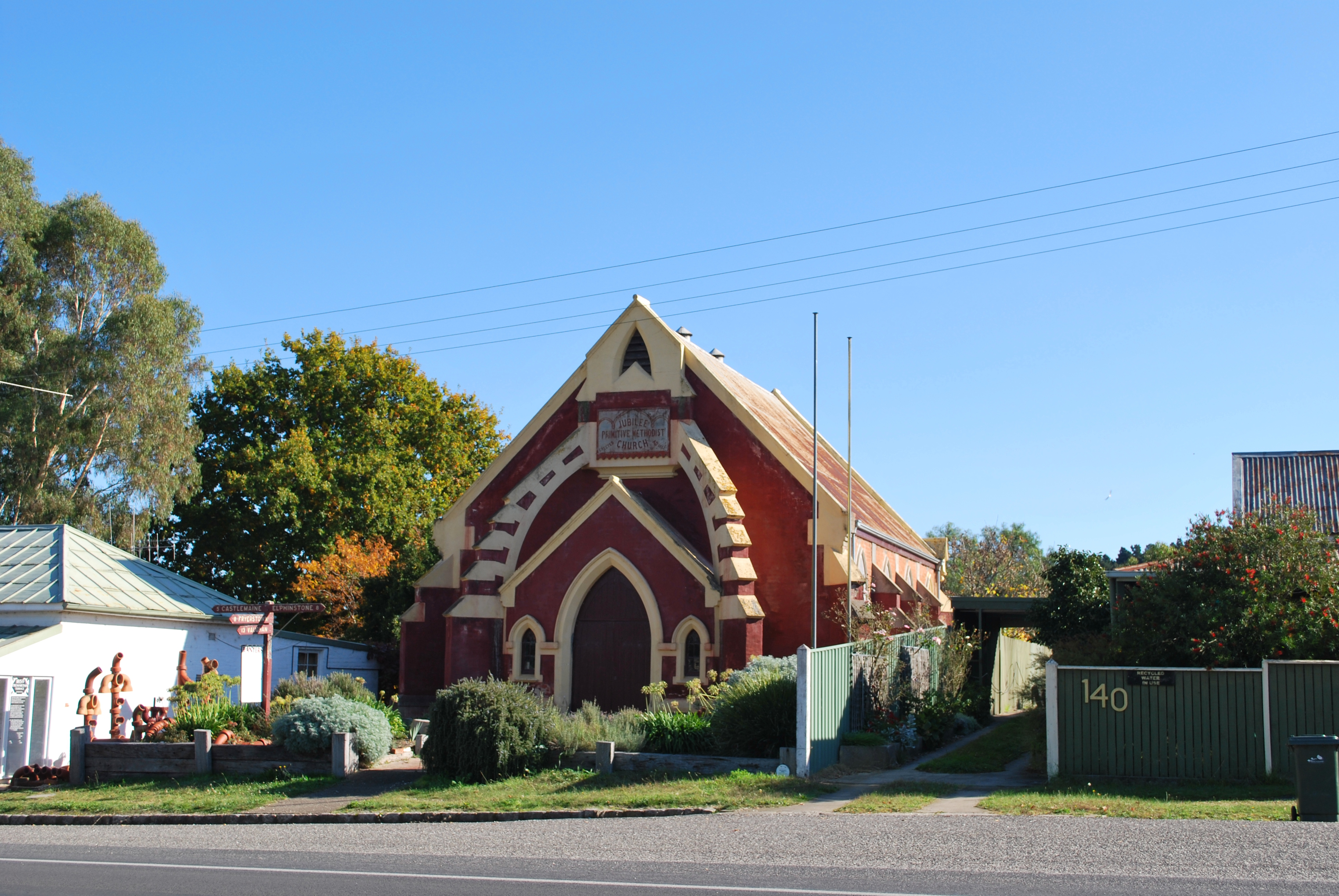

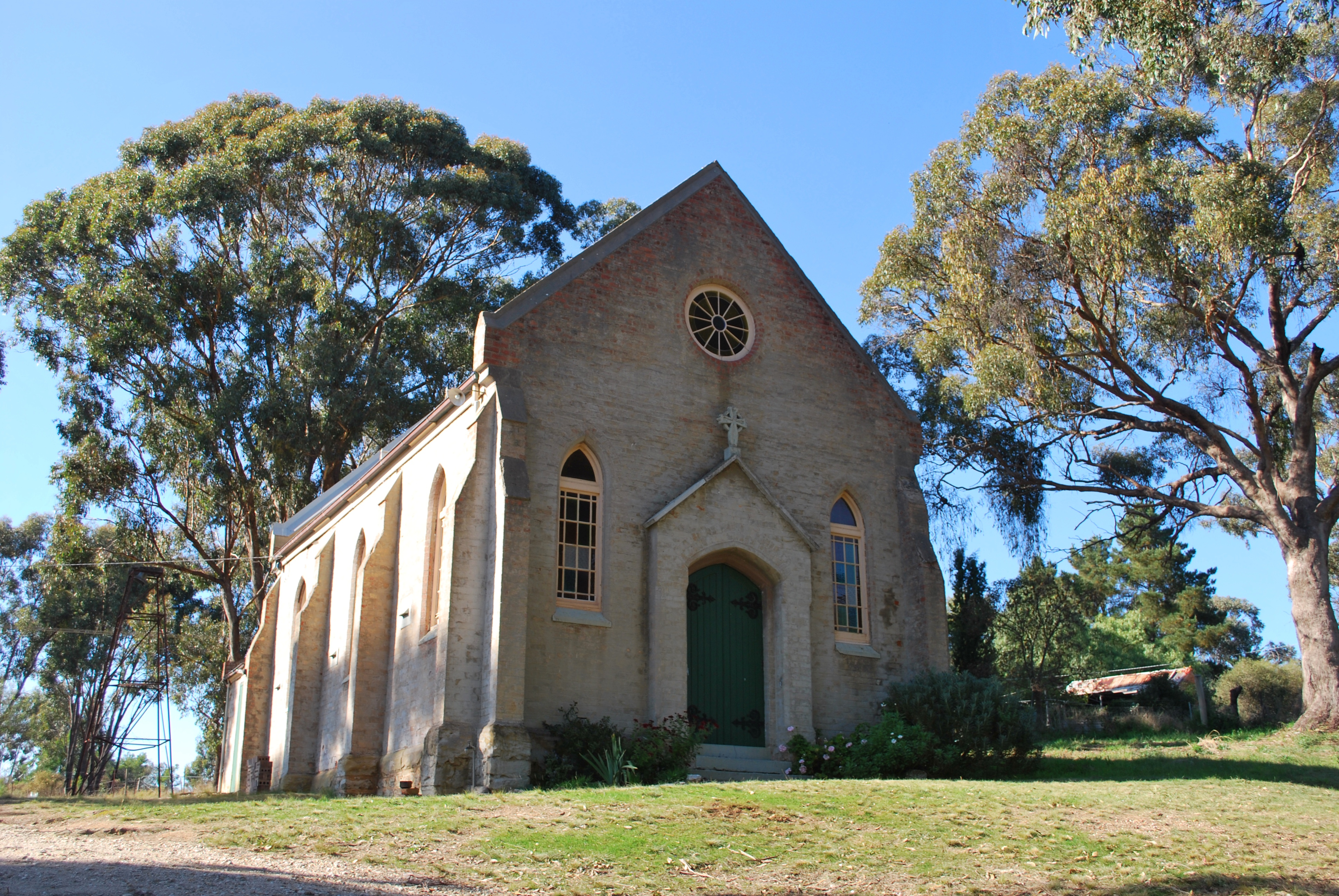

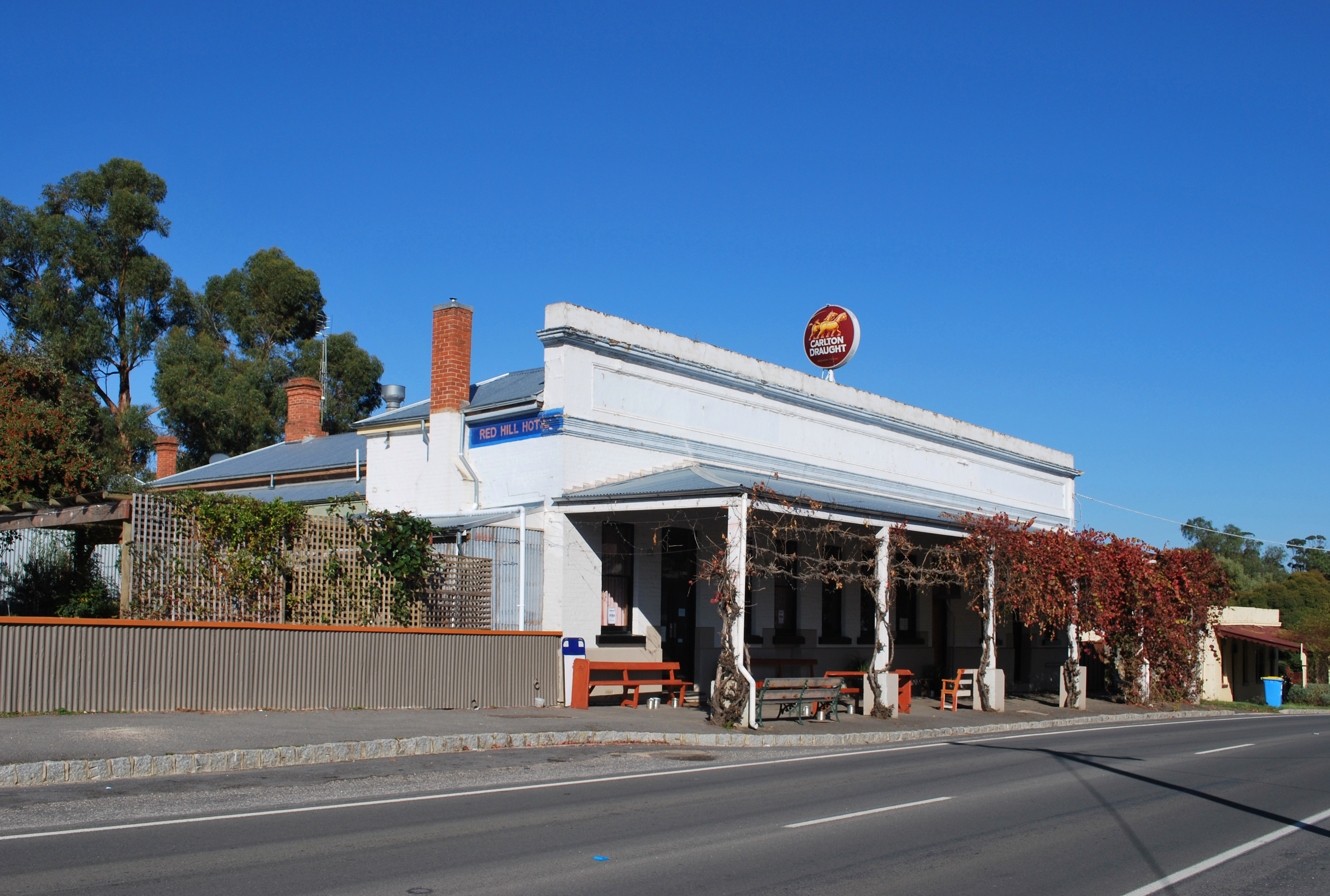

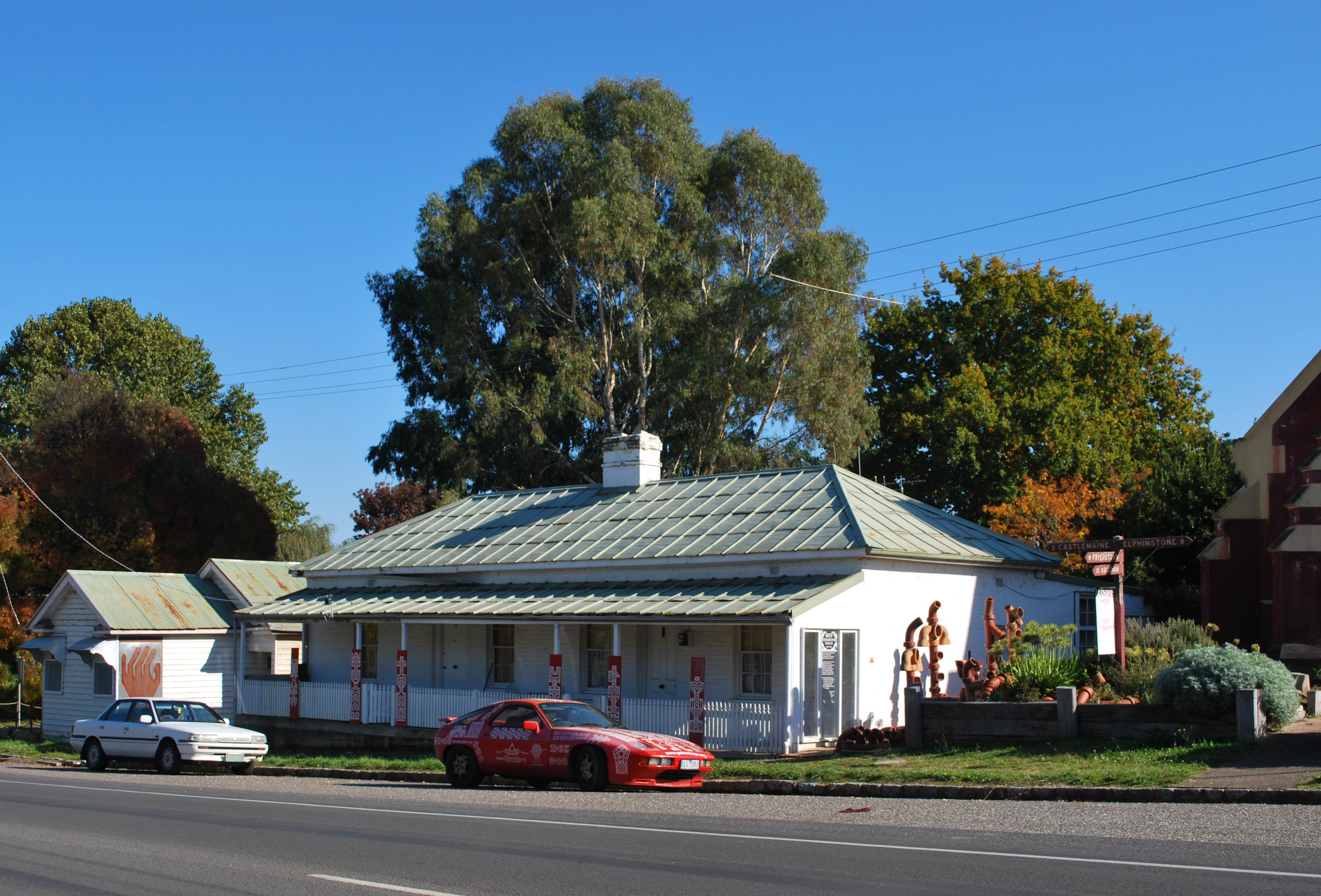

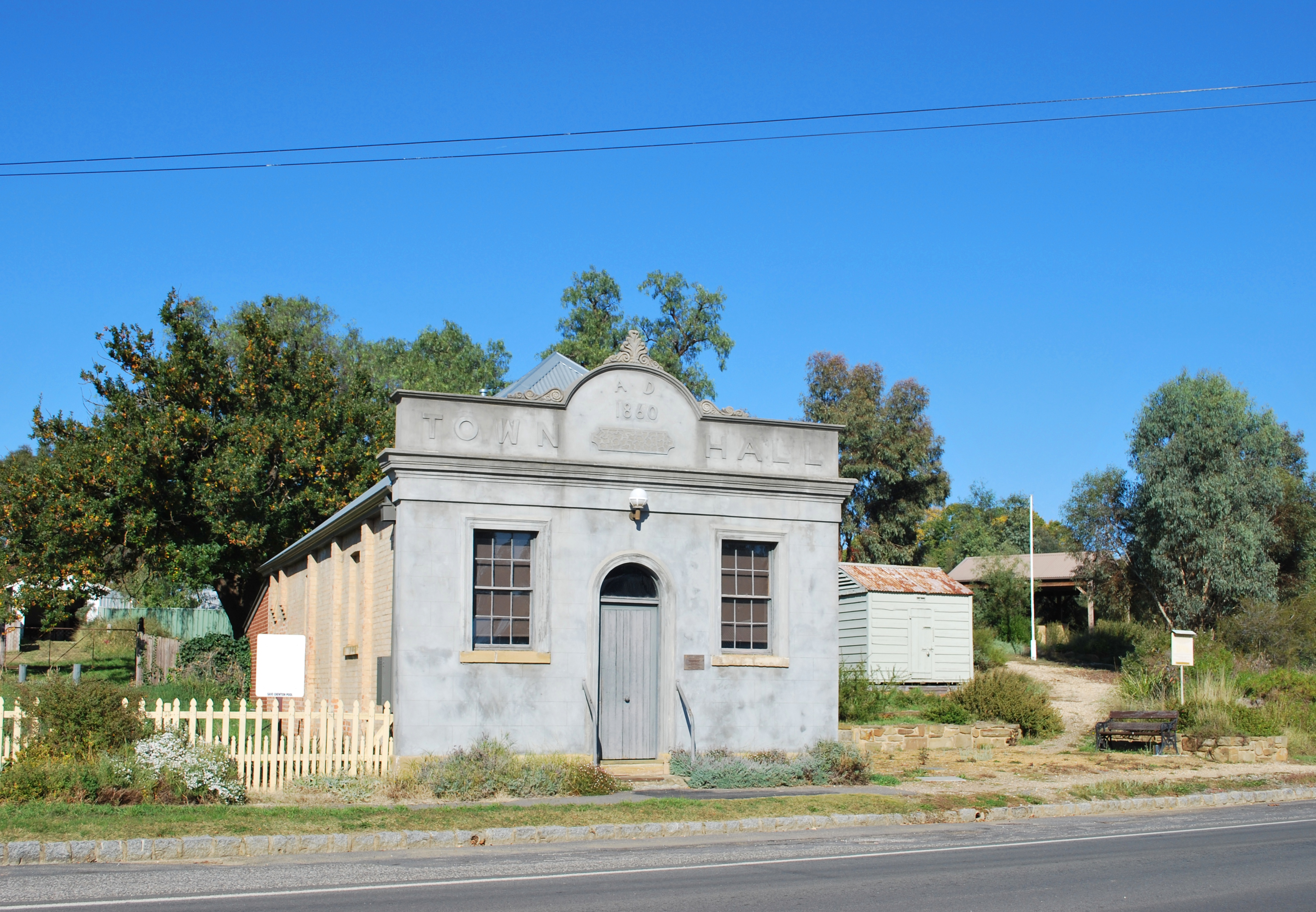

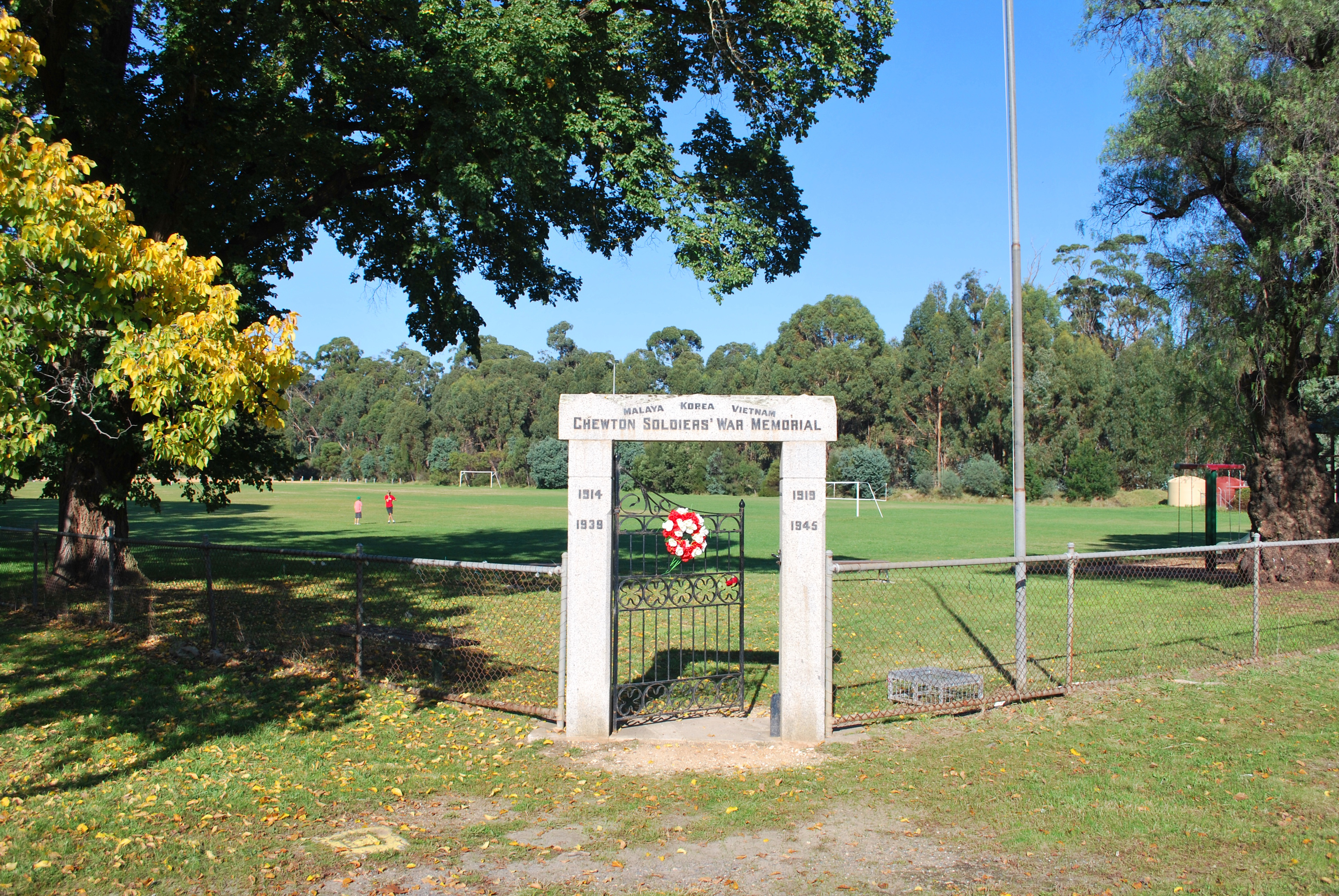
