= Newstead, Victoria =

Newstead
- Town
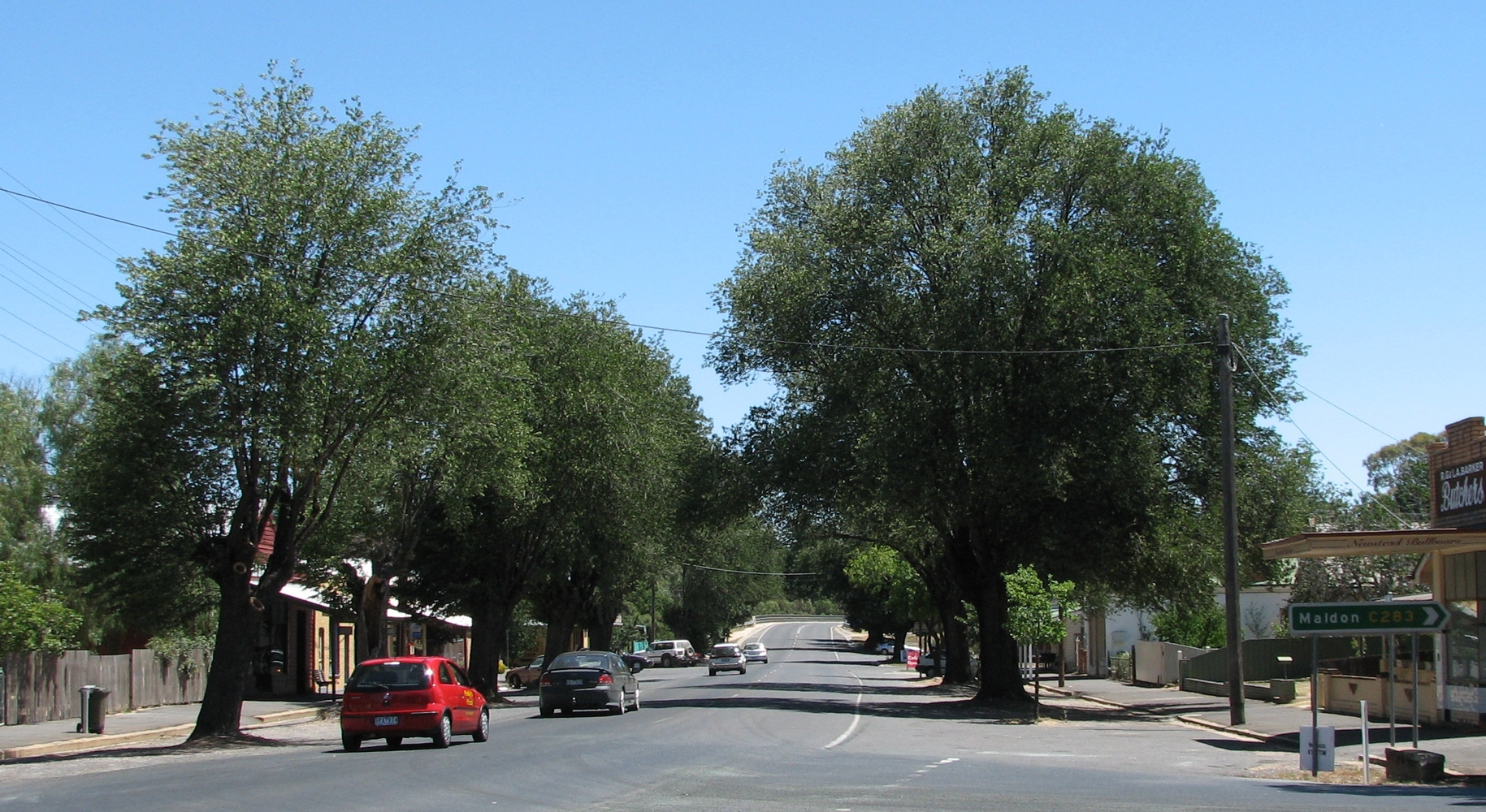
- Lyons Street

- Interactive map of Newstead
- Coordinates: 37°6′19″S 144°3′54″E
- Country: Australia
- State: Victoria
- LGA: Shire of Mount Alexander
- Location: 142 km (88 mi) from Melbourne; 55 km (34 mi) from Bendigo; 17 km (11 mi) from Castlemaine; 32 km (20 mi) from Maryborough

Government
  - State electorate: Bendigo West
  - Federal division: Bendigo

Area
  - Total: 47.1 km^{2} (18.2 sq mi)
- Elevation: 219 m (719 ft)

Population
  - Total: 820 (2021 census)
  - Density: 17.41/km^{2} (45.1/sq mi)
- Time zone: UTC+10 (AEST)
  - Summer (DST): UTC+11 (AEST)
- Postcode: 3462

Newstead is a town in Victoria, Australia, situated along the Loddon River. It is in the Shire of Mount Alexander local government area. At the 2021 census, Newstead had a population of 820. Newstead has many festivals and folk events and is in the centre of the golden triangle, close to many tourist attractions and events.

== History ==
Although Newstead is located in the Victorian Goldfields, the settlement began as a crossing-place on the Loddon River (known as “Mingus’s crossing-place”) on the way to the nearby Castlemaine and Mount Alexander diggings. A very early business at the crossing-place was a “refreshment tent” operated by Thomas Jones (probably established in about 1853-4). The refreshment tent, called the “Bullock Drivers’ Home”, was primarily a sly-grog shop (for which Jones was charged on several occasions), but also incorporated “a bakehouse, butcher's shop, three-stalled stable, stockyard, and about a quarter of an acre of well-stocked garden ground”.

By mid-year 1855 the partnership of James David Jones and Frederick Beard (businessmen from Castlemaine) had completed and opened the Newstead Hotel at Mingus’ crossing-place (with Jones as the publican license-holder). Soon after the hotel was opened their local business rival, the sly-grog seller Thomas Jones, erected a bridge over the Loddon “at his own expense” (which was subsequently destroyed by flood waters in September 1855, within a month or two of being built). The locality began to be referred to as the Newstead Crossing (or simply Newstead) after the name of the hotel.

By August 1856 Jones and Beard of the Newstead Hotel had constructed more substantial bridge over the Loddon River.

A Post Office at Newstead was opened on 1 August 1857. The first Postmaster was Mr. J. Day.

In about June 1858 district farmers and landholders formed the Newstead Agricultural Society which held competitive ploughing matches and organised annual agricultural shows highlighting district produce and livestock. The Society flourished during the 1860s and early 1870s, guided by its secretary, Andrew Kirwan.

The Newstead Magistrates' Court closed on 1 November 1981, not having been visited by a Magistrate since 1980.

== Sport and recreation ==
Newstead has a number of different sporting groups within the town, some of these are the lawn bowls club, croquet club, football and netball club, tennis club, natives groups, walking group and spinners' group.

Newstead Football / Netball Club

The town has a football / netball club that was established in 1877 and has competed in the Maryborough Castlemaine District Football League since 1960.

In 1893, Newstead won the Castlemaine Junior Football Association premiership

In 1898, Newstead's F Marslen won the best and fairest award in the Castlemaine District Football Association.

In 1911, Newstead were runners up to Castlemaine Foundry United FC in the Castlemaine District Football Association.

Newstead FC have won the following senior football premierships -

- Castlemaine Second Rate Football Association: (Reserves)
  - 1909
- Clunes Football League:
  - 1933,
- Maryborough Castlemaine District Football League:
  - 1939 1966, 1979, 1993, 2000, 2009.

== Governance ==
The first local government body to cover Newstead was the Newstead Road District, which was created in 1860 and redesignated as Newstead Shire in February 1865. In October 1915 Newstead Shire absorbed Mount Alexander United Shire, which had been created in June 1871 by amalgamating Campbell's Creek Road District, Fryers Road District and Guildford Borough. The expanded shire was renamed Newstead & Mount Alexander Shire in May 1916. The name reverted to Newstead Shire in May 1949. In January 1995 Newstead Shire was amalgamated with Castlemaine City, part of Maldon Shire and part of Metcalfe Shire to form Mount Alexander Shire.

== The town today ==
It has two pubs, community centre, cafe, a general store, a Rural Transaction Centre (with Internet café, Bendigo Bank, library, daycare and other services), a small licensed IGA and bakery, a swimming pool, a hairdresser as well as a monthly newspaper, the Newstead Echo. It also has a licensed cafe, a butcher, two small shops selling vintage odds and ends and a winery just out of town.

There is a town primary school and kindergarten and high schools nearby, a community hall, race park and Rotunda park for events such as the Newstead Fire Brigade Market which occurs 4 times a year.

There is a women's group, four churches, performers group, organic growers group, playgroup, senior citizens' club, lawn bowls club, croquet club, football and netball club, tennis club, natives groups, walking group and spinners' group. Annually, Newstead holds a folk music festival over the Australia Day weekend with artists coming from all around Australia and some from overseas. As well as 'Chopped' magazine holding their annual, Chopped Rod & Custom show, which brings traditional style rods and custom cars from all over Australia into the town for a weekend.

The Loddon River that flows through the town has caused a levee bank to be built in 1912 which has stopped the town from flooding several times. The old courthouse has now become the Newstead historical society and holds a collection of items relating to the history of Newstead.
