= Bill Seedsman =

Australian rules footballer

Personal information
- Full name: William James Seedsman
- Born: 18 September 1914; Maldon, Victoria
- Died: 10 October 2001 (aged 87)
- Original team: Kew
- Height: 183 cm (6 ft 0 in)
- Weight: 85 kg (187 lb)

Playing career^{1}
Years	Club	Games (Goals)
1936	Hawthorn	1 (0)
1942	Collingwood	1 (0)
Total		2 (0)
- ^{1} Playing statistics correct to the end of 1942.

William James Seedsman (18 September 1914 – 10 October 2001) was an Australian rules footballer who played with Hawthorn and Collingwood in the Victorian Football League (VFL).
