= Margaret Sabine =

Australian virologist

- Born: Jean Margaret Edney; 29 October 1928; Castlemaine, Victoria, Australia
- Died: 5 January 2011 (aged 82)
- Education: University of London
- Scientific career
- Thesis: Studies on the toxicity of influenza viruses (1955)

Margaret Sabine (1928–2011) was the pioneering virologist for Australian veterinary schools. She conducted studies on viruses in cats and horses, with her characterisation of different equine viruses being her most significant scientific contribution. Other achievements include becoming head of the department of veterinary pathology and bacteriology, being chairwoman of the NSW Animal Welfare Advisory Council, an honorary Doctor of Veterinary Science degree at the University of Sydney, and being a co-discoverer of viral interference.

== Early life ==
Sabine was born on 29 October 1928, in Castlemaine, Victoria and named Jean Margaret Edney. She attended Mac.Robertson Girls High in Melbourne. She attended Melbourne University, studying biochemistry and graduated with a master's degree in science in 1948.

== Career ==
Margaret Sabine (née Edney) began her career working as an assistant to Sir MacFarlane Burnet at the Walter and Eliza Hall Institute. Sabine collaborated on research into the viral interference phenomenon with Alick Isaacs during the year he spent in Burnet's laboratory in 1956. Sabine later switched her research interests from human virology to virology in animals. Sabine was awarded her doctorate from University College Hospital Medical School in London.

She married Terry Sabine, a physicist, in 1956.

From 1973 she was a member of the Faculty of Veterinary Science at the University of Sydney, where she was the first virologist appointed to a veterinary school in Australia and in 1991 and 1992 she was Head of the Department of Veterinary Pathology. In 1976 her lab discovered and characterised the different equine herpes viruses which affected racehorses.

Sabine retired in 1993, having also served as vice principal of The Women's College at the University of Sydney from 1984 to 1992.

Sabine died on 5 January 2011.

== Works ==
- Edney, Jean Margaret (1952), The multiplication of bacteriophages : a review of literature; Influence of ions on thermal inactivation and modification of an influenza virus
- Sabine, Margaret; Spradbrow, Peter; University of Queensland. Post-Graduate Veterinary Science Committee (1992), Virology for Australian veterinarians (2nd ed.), Veterinary Science Post-Graduate Committee, University of Queensland
- Sabine, Margaret (1995), Veterinary virology in Australia : the French connection : proceedings of a conference held at the Women's College within the University of Sydney, Australia, 9-11 July, 1994, Elsevier

== Awards ==
- Sabine was conferred the title of Honorary Fellow of the University of Sydney in 2001.
