= Lillian Wheeler =

Australian actress

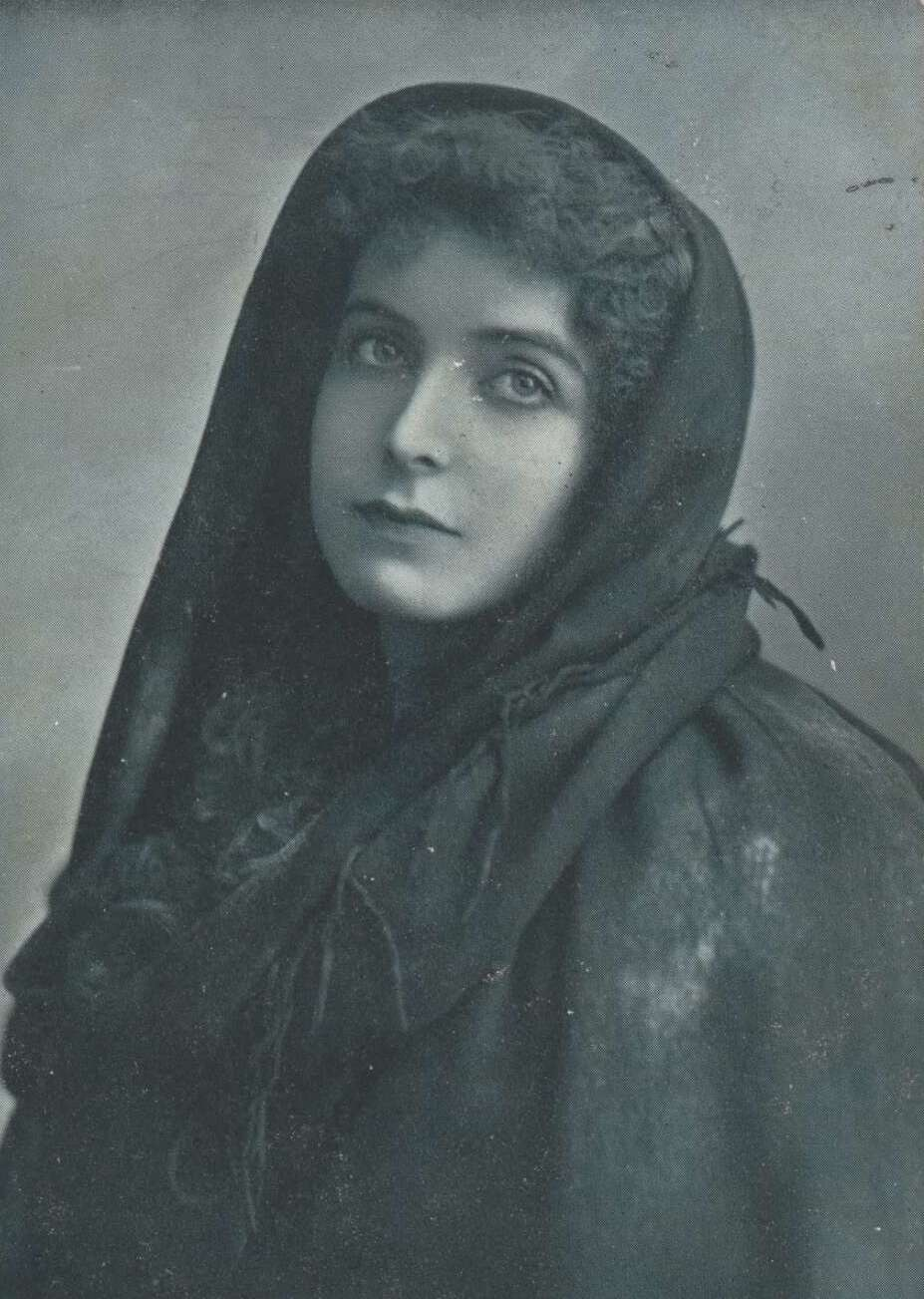
- Born: c. 1880; Castlemaine, Victoria, Australia
- Died: 11 November 1905 (aged 24–25); Manhattan, New York City, USA
- Spouse: Ernest Mainwaring

Lillian Wheeler (c. 1880 – 11 November 1905) was an Australian actor.

== Career ==
Born in Castlemaine, Victoria, Lillian Wheeler began her stage career in 1896, after studying at Parkvillle College, Melbourne. She performed in Bland Holt’s company, and then alongside George Rignold in leading roles in Australia, and was part of Rignold's company. She moved to London, England in 1901 and performed in an adaption of Sherlock Holmes that toured England and was to tour America in 1903. She played the leading role of Madge Larrabee.

In England, Wheeler married actor Ernest Mainwaring in 1904.

After Mr Mainwaring was performing in the United States of America, Lillian Wheeler left England to join him but caught pneumonia while in New York. She died in November 1905. Her remains were transferred to England.
