= Harvey Sutton =

Australian athlete (1882–1963)

Personal information
- Born: 18 February 1882 Castlemaine, Victoria, Australia
- Died: 21 June 1963 (aged 81) Rose Bay, New South Wales, Australia

Sport
- Country: Australia
- Sport: Track and field

Harvey Vincent Sutton (18 February 1882 – 21 June 1963) was an Australian athlete and public health physician. He was Victoria's second Rhodes Scholar, following John Behan, a fellow alumnus of Trinity College, Melbourne.

== Family ==
The son of Castlemaine gaol warder William Sutton (1838-1912), and Hannah Sutton (1837-1930), née Howe, Harvey Vincent Sutton was born at Castlemaine on 18 February 1882.

He attended school at Castlemaine and St Andrew's College, Bendigo. From 1898, he was a resident in Trinity College, Melbourne while studying medicine at the University of Melbourne (M.B., 1902; Ch.B., 1903; M.D., 1905), receiving his clinical training at Melbourne Hospital.

His older brother Edmund Hamilton "Ned" Sutton (1868-1911) played VFA football for both Carlton (1888-1889) and Melbourne (1895-1896), and also played with Melbourne (and was the team's captain) in its first two years in the VFL (1897 and 1898).

== Athletics career ==
In 1903-04, Sutton became the Australian National Champion in the 880 yard race, having finished in third place two years earlier.

In 1905 Sutton attended New College, Oxford, for whom he competed against Cambridge in athletics and lacrosse.

He competed in the 1908 Summer Olympics in London on the Australasia team, a combined squad of competitors from Australia and New Zealand. In the 800 metres, Sutton placed third in his initial semifinal heat and did not advance to the final. His time was 2:00.0.

== Later life ==
Sutton become resident medical officer at Charing Cross Hospital before returning to Australia in 1909.

He served as a doctor in World War I. He was twice mentioned in despatches and in 1919 was awarded the Order of the British Empire for his services in the Middle East.

In 1921, Sutton transferred to the NSW school medical service, and in 1930, he became the first director of the School of Public Health and Tropical Medicine at the University of Sydney. He had a particular interest in eugenic approaches to the moral and physical development of children. He believed that national development depended on state intervention in education and public health programs.

Sutton died at his home in Rose Bay, New South Wales in 1963.

== Publications ==
- Harvey Sutton (1944), Lectures on Preventative Medicine, Sydney: Consolidated Press
