= Castlemaine, Victoria =

Castlemaine
- City
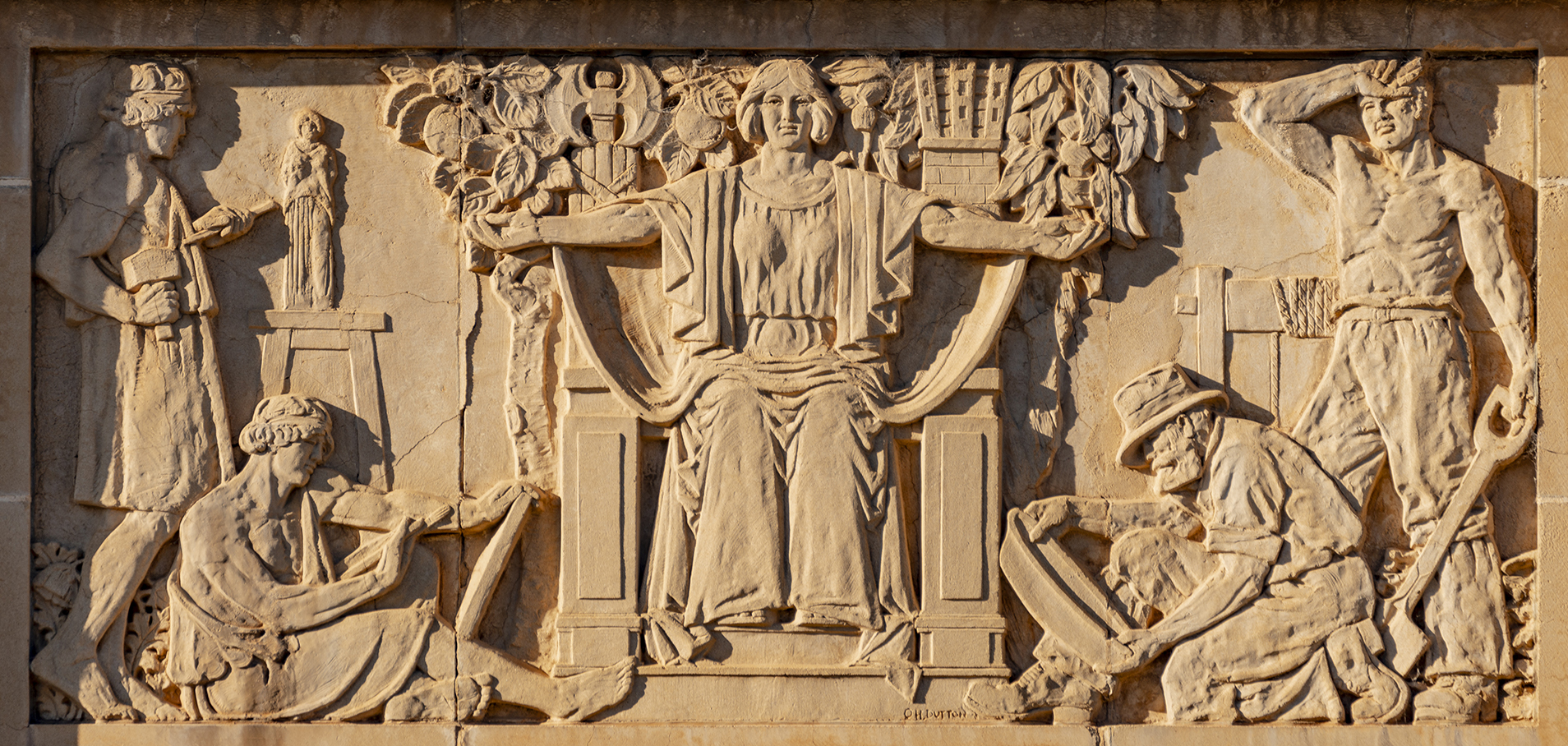
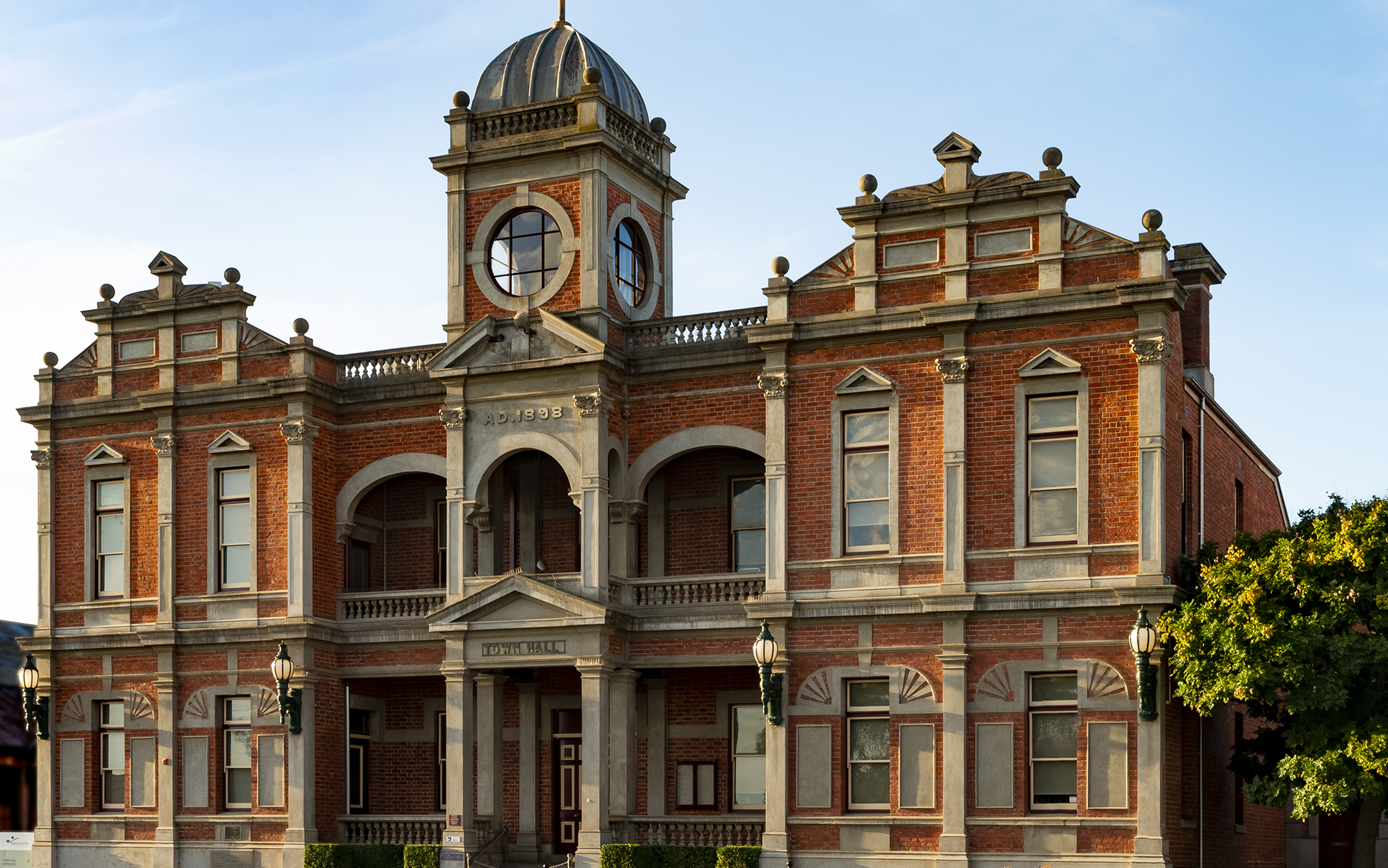
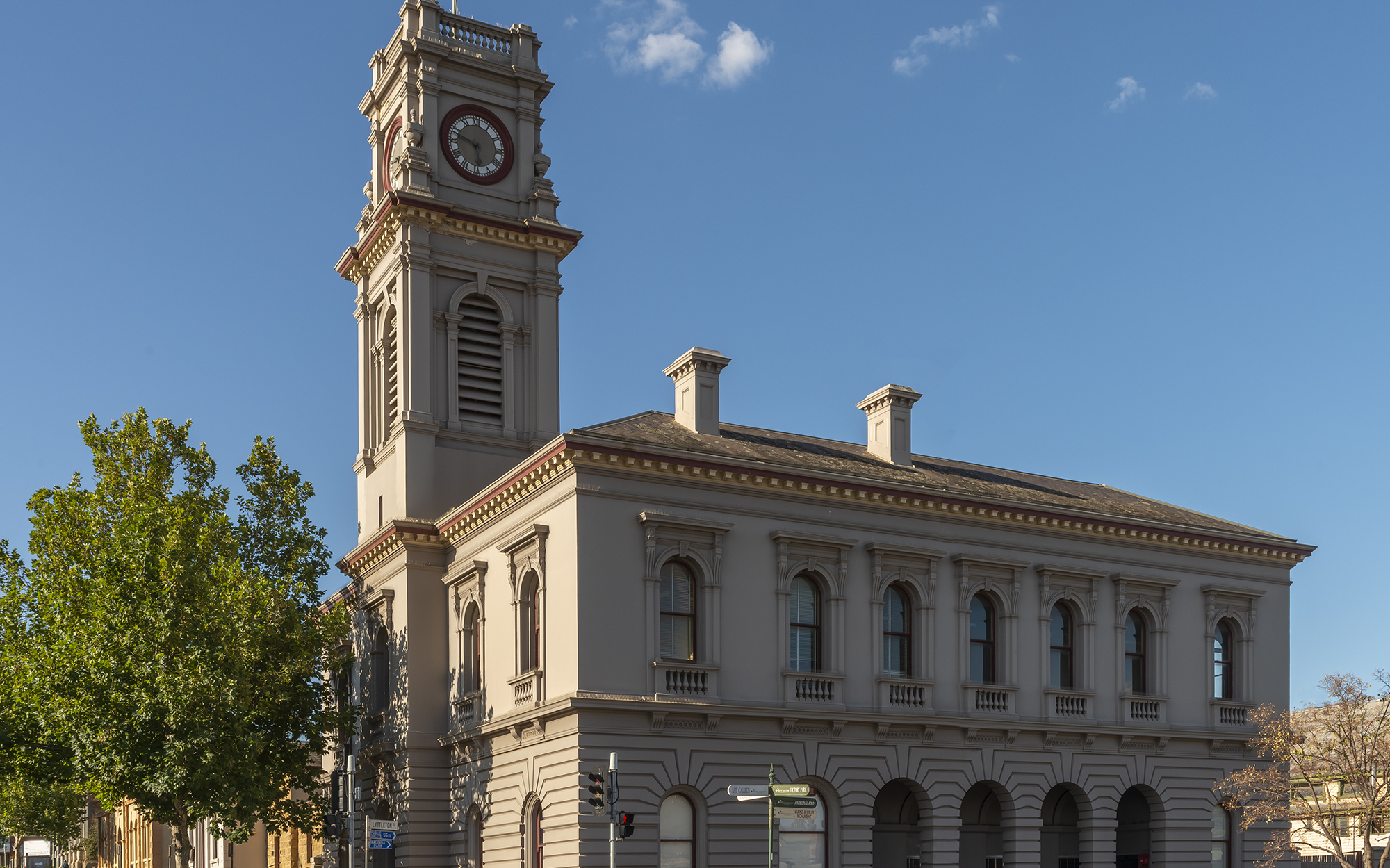
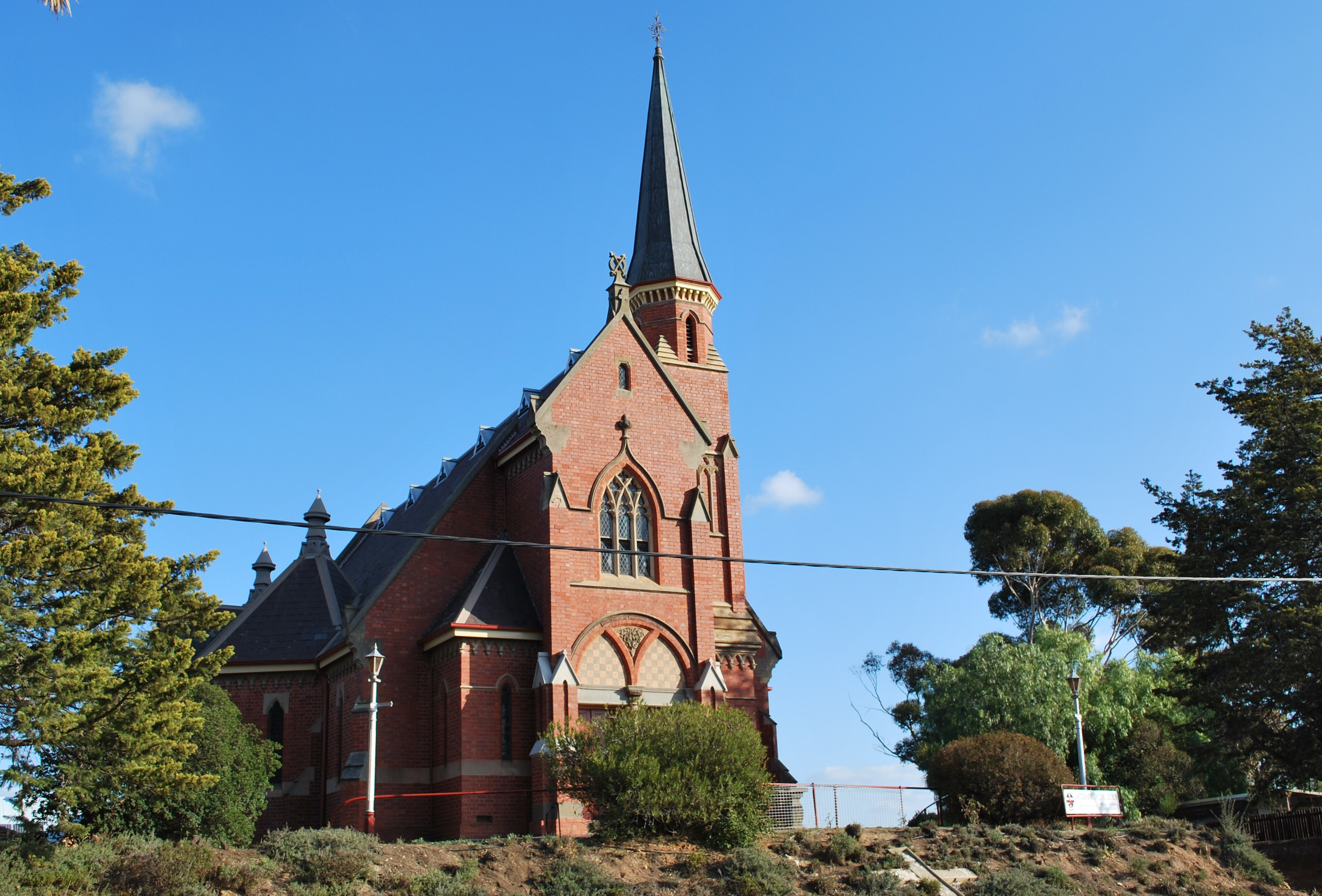
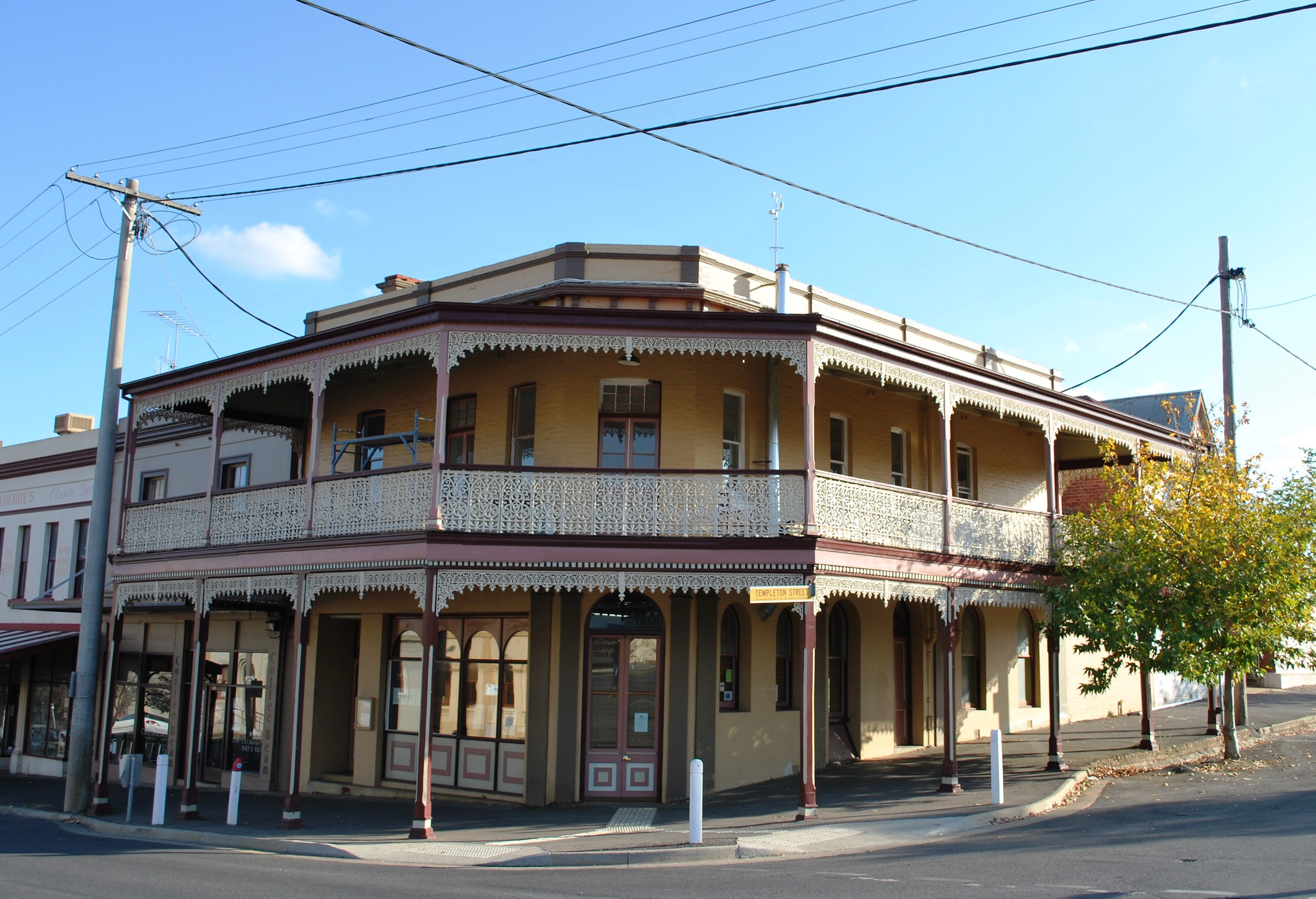
- CBD Castlemaine: Tutelary deity of Castlemaine, Town Hall, Post Office, Castlemaine Uniting Church, The Hub building in Barker Street

- Interactive map of Castlemaine
- Coordinates: 37°3′49″S 144°13′2″E
- Country: Australia
- State: Victoria
- LGA: Shire of Mount Alexander
- Location: 123 km (76 mi) from Melbourne; 39 km (24 mi) from Bendigo; 82 km (51 mi) from Ballarat
- Established: 1851

Government
  - State electorate: Bendigo West
  - Federal division: Bendigo

Area
  - Total: 20.1 km^{2} (7.8 sq mi)
- Elevation: 281 m (922 ft)

Population
  - Total: 7,506 (2021 census)
  - Density: 373.4/km^{2} (967.2/sq mi)
- Time zone: UTC+10 (AEST)
  - Summer (DST): UTC+11 (AEST)
- Postcode: 3450
- Mean max temp: 20.2 °C (68.4 °F)
- Mean min temp: 6.7 °C (44.1 °F)
- Annual rainfall: 558.4 mm (21.98 in)

Castlemaine (/ˈkæsəlmeɪn/ KASS-əl-mayn, non-locally also /ˈkɑːs-/ KAHSS-) is a town in west central Victoria, Australia, in the Goldfields region about 123 kilometres (76 miles) northwest by road from Melbourne and about 39 kilometres (24 miles) from the major provincial centre of Bendigo. It is the administrative and economic centre of the Shire of Mount Alexander. Castlemaine was named by the chief goldfield commissioner, Captain W. Wright, in honour of his Irish uncle, Viscount Castlemaine. At the 2021 census, Castlemaine had a population of 7,506.

Castlemaine began as a gold rush boomtown in 1851 and developed into a major regional centre, being officially proclaimed a city on 4 December 1965, although since declining in population.

It is home to many cultural institutions including the Theatre Royal, the oldest continuously operating theatre in mainland Australia.

== Pronunciation ==
When in spoken Australian English, the word "castle", as it is in "Newcastle", has a long "a" like "car," the way locals pronounce the name of the town sounds contrary to visitors. It is Castlemaine's predominantly Irish early population whose pronunciation still influences that most used locally for "Castlemaine": with a distinct, hard "a" sound in the first syllable (rhyming with "hassle" rather than "car") and a distinct emphasis on the second syllable ("mayn"). Likewise, the Munster Irish Gaeilge for the town Caisleán na Mainge (translated as "Castle on the Maine" or Castlemaine) in County Kerry renders "Caisleán" as "kuh-SHLAWN", while Northern speakers in Ulster say it "KASH-lan" (/ˈkæʃl̠ʲanˠ/).

== Geology of the district ==
Around 450 million years ago, a shallow sea deposited layers of clay, silt and sand which are now the Ordovician sedimentary sandstone and mudstone rocks underlying Castlemaine. Tectonic pressure from the east then folded and compressed these layers into steep north-south strata. About 370 million years ago, molten rock intruded underground, cooling into granodiorite which is the rock forming Mount Alexander. The intense heat metamorphosed surrounding sediments into hornfels and slate, and silica-rich solutions deposited quartz veins, concentrating gold. Permian age glaciation, Jurassic era volcanic dykes, and Cenozoic basalt flows and river gravels complete the sequence.

=== Gold ===
Hydrothermal fluids migrated into fractures in the Ordovician sediments during the granodiorite intrusion, depositing gold alongside quartz and iron sulphide. Subsequent erosion liberated alluvial gold into Forest Creek at Chewton and Castlemaine. Almost no gold occurred on the granite of Mount Alexander itself. By 1851, at the beginning of the gold rush, geological principles were well understood and received by the general population through books and newspapers, and taught by local scientists including Thomas Sergeant Hall at the Castlemaine School of Mines who contributed internationally significant palaeontological work on the succession of graptolites in local Ordovician strata.

Alfred Selwyn produced arguably Australia's first government geological map here in 1853, from which geologist Charles Gould, in a government report, noted a:

Unity of direction, more especially, is common in many districts, and is strikingly illustrated in sheets 9, 13, 14 of the Maps of the Geological Survey of Victoria, devoted to the Castlemaine Gold Field, where some hundreds of quartz reefs are laid down, all coursing slightly to the west of the north and east of south, without a single instance of any great deviation from that direction.

=== Geological features within Mount Alexander Shire ===
Anticlinal fold marked with a plaque in Lyttleton Street, Castlemaine, east of Urquhart Street:

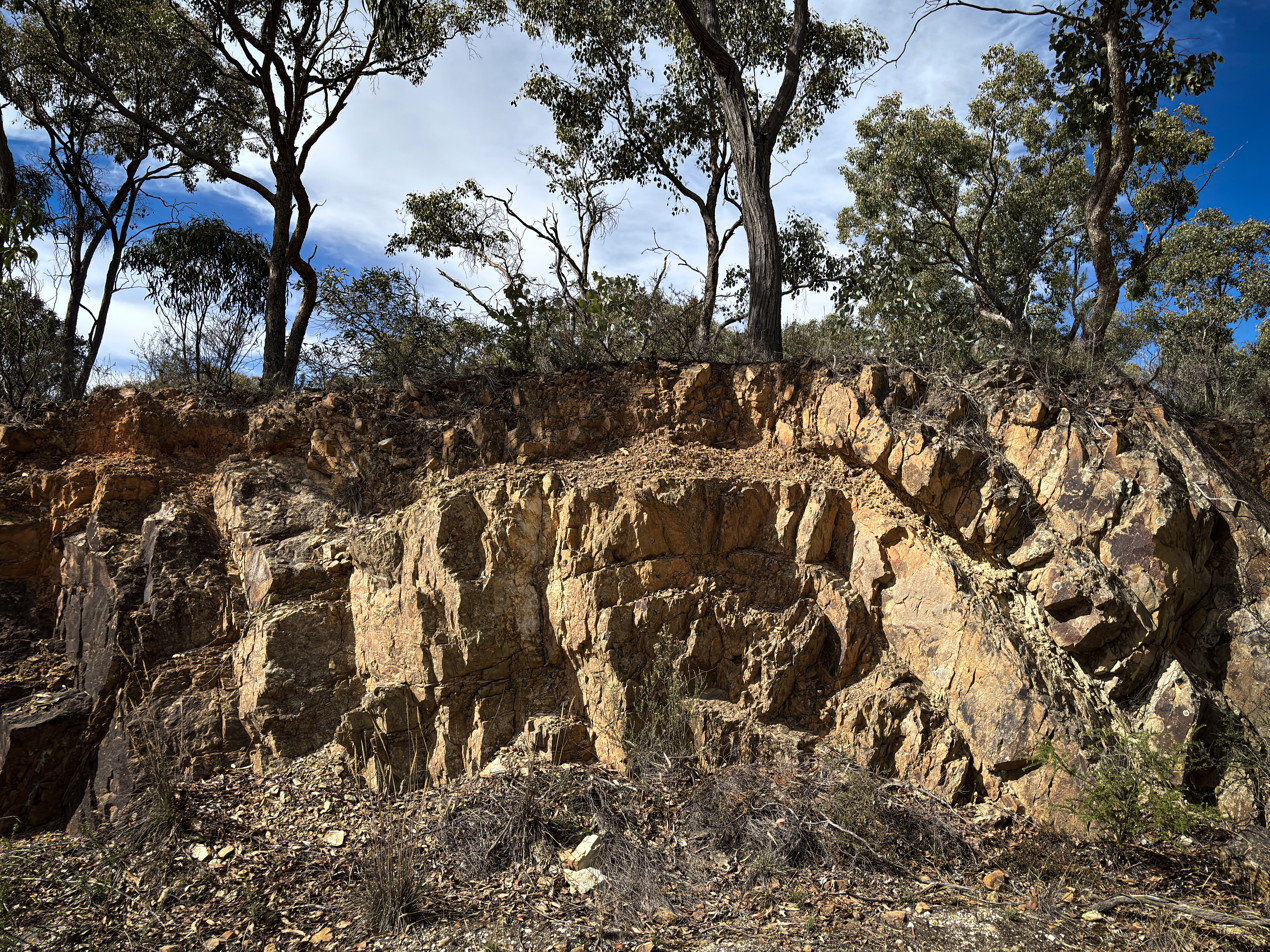
Kalimna Tourist Road anticline in Castlemaine, off-axis oblique view, fault at left

- Lyttleton Street, Castlemaine, east of Urquhart Street: anticlinal fold in north-side road cutting
- Kalimna Tourist Road anticline (200m north of Hunter Street, Castlemaine): fold and small fault in road cutting
- Hard Hill, Chewton (Railway Street railway bridge): near-vertical Ordovician folds; syncline, quartz veins and faulting are visible
- Specimen Gully Road, Barkers Creek: the granodiorite–Ordovician boundary, with the metamorphic aureole visible stretching toward Mount Tarrengower
- Slate quarries, Barkers Creek (Specimen Gully Road, opposite Cappers Gully Track): historic quarries that once supplied Melbourne's Collins Street paving
- Dog Rocks, Liyanganuk/Mount Alexander (off Joseph Young Drive, Harcourt): spectacular granite tors formed by weathering along joint planes
- The Cascades, Metcalfe (Cascades Road): the Coliban River cascading over granite, with pot-holes worn into bedrock through boulders and gravel trapped in a hollow being swirled by turbulent water in a circular motion, grinding into the bedrock like a drill bit in an action called 'pothole drilling' or evorsion. The resulting cylindrical depressions are sometimes called 'giant's kettles'.

== History ==
=== First Nations ===
Castlemaine colonised the traditional lands of the Dja Dja Wurrung people, also known as the Jaara people. They were regarded by other tribes as being a superior people, not only because of their rich hunting grounds but because from their area came tachylite, a hard glassy volcanic stone valued for weapons and tools Augustus Robinson, appointed Chief Protector of Aborigines for Port Phillip (Victoria) in 1839, traveled to the district and met amicably with them and the local Protector Parker, and reported that the Dja Dja Wurrung were a strong, physically well-developed people and not belligerent. The Djara people have a rich culture and reverence for the land.

The environmental devastation caused by gold mining from the 1850s was widespread and permanent in the entire district. It extinguished many native plant and animal species in the area, and decimated and displaced the Dja Dja Wurrung, for whom quartz was of value but not the soft gold it contained, and who regarded the resulting destruction as having turned their land into 'upside-down country.'

Their vital water sources included non-perennial creeks and associated underground springs. Mining spread contaminants and destroyed the infrastructure the indigenous people created over generations to maximise seasonal drainage patterns; channels and weirs they built out of timber stakes, to slow receding summer flows, were wrecked; water holes where the people gathered in smaller groups during periods of scarce rainfall and from which they transported water in skin bags when moving, were muddied, polluted and drained; the soaks they had dug between banks into sandy sediment to tap into the water table were likewise obliterated. Some of their waterholes in rock platforms of the Creek that they found or enlarged, then covered with slabs to protect them from animals, may still remain, unidentified.

=== Europeans ===
The first European settlers named it Forest Creek and as the population grew it became known as Mount Alexander. The old name is still present in some place names in Victoria including the Shire of Mount Alexander and the former main road leading to it from Melbourne – Mount Alexander Road. Major Mitchell passed through the region in 1836. Following his discovery, the first squatters arrived in 1837 to establish vast sheep runs.

In 1854, Chief goldfields commissioner, Captain W. Wright, renamed the settlement 'Castlemaine' in honour of his Irish uncle, Viscount Castlemaine.

=== Discovery of gold ===
On 20 July 1851 gold was discovered near present-day Castlemaine (Mt Alexander Goldfields) at Specimen Gully on Barkers Creek. The gold was discovered by Christopher Thomas Peters, a shepherd and hut-keeper on the Barker's Creek, in the service of Dr William Barker on his Mount Alexander run. When the gold was shown in the men's quarters, Peters was ridiculed for finding fool's gold, and the gold was thrown away. Barker did not want his workmen to abandon his sheep, but in August they did just that. John Worley, George Robinson and Robert Keen, also in the employ of Barker as shepherds and a bullock driver, immediately teamed with Peters in working the deposits by panning in Specimen Gully where the gold had been found, which they did in relative privacy during the next month. When Barker sacked them and ran them off his land for trespass, Worley, on behalf of the party "to prevent them getting in trouble", mailed a letter to The Argus (Melbourne) dated 1 September 1851 announcing this new goldfield with the precise location of their workings. This letter was published on 8 September 1851. "With this obscure notice, rendered still more so by the journalist as 'Western Port', were ushered to the world the inexhaustible treasures of Mount Alexander" also to become known as the Forest Creek diggings. Within a month there were about 8,000 diggers working the alluvial beds of the creeks near the present day town of Castlemaine, and particularly Forest Creek which runs through Chewton where the first small village was established. By the end of the year there were about 25,000 on the field.

=== Gold rush: a city develops ===
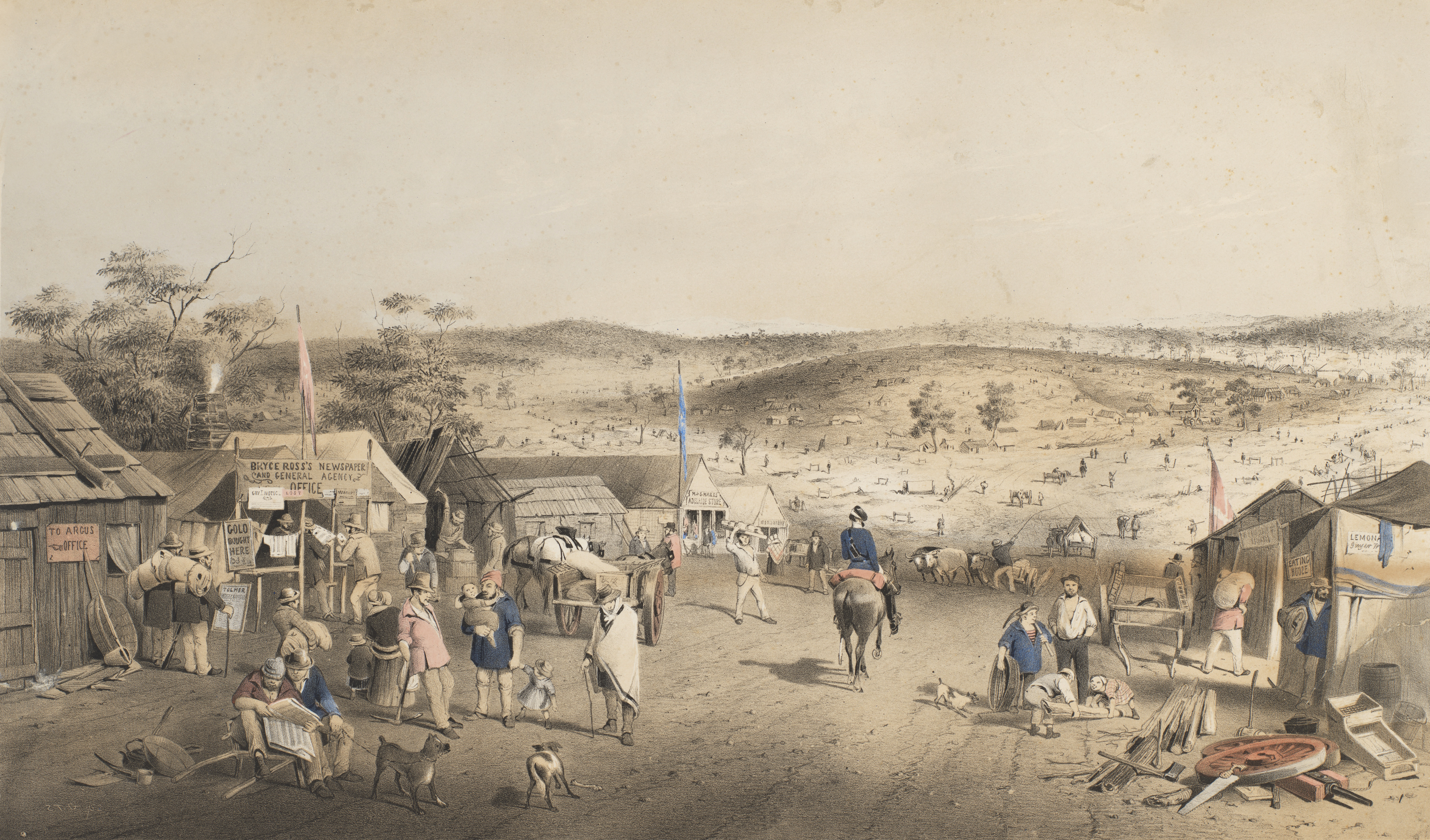
Samuel Thomas Gill (1852) The first small village to develop on the Mount Alexander goldfields at Forest Creek (Chewton) near Castlemaine

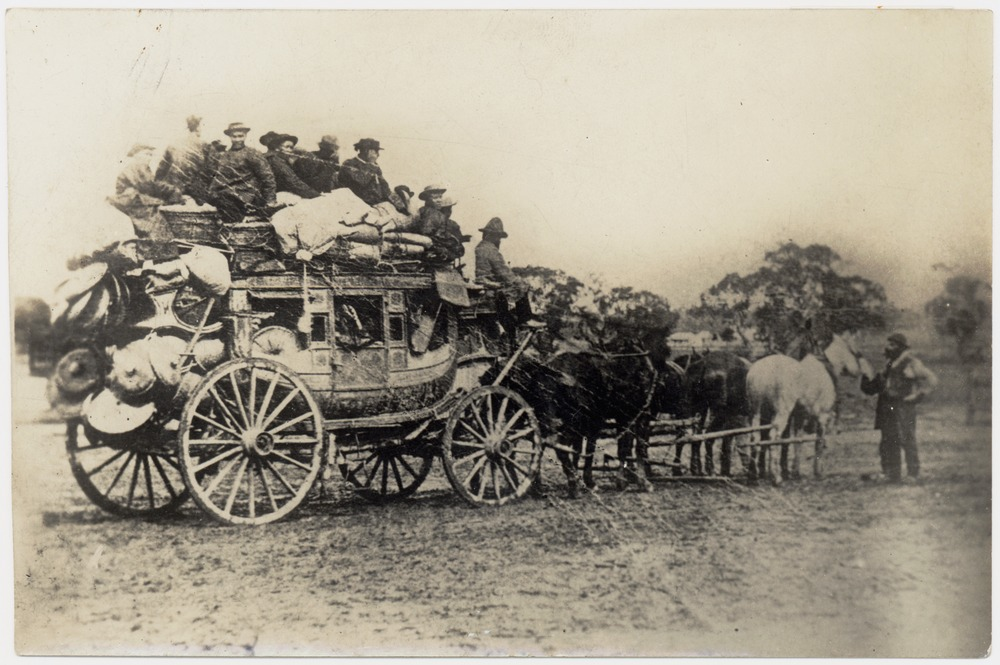
Coach is packed with equipment, Chinese passengers inside and on top of coach, 1853.

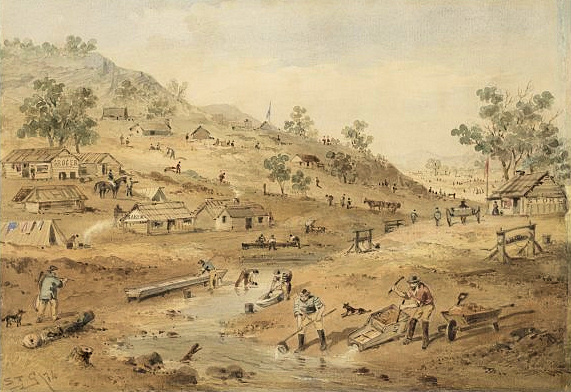
ST Gill (1852) Mount Alexander goldfields

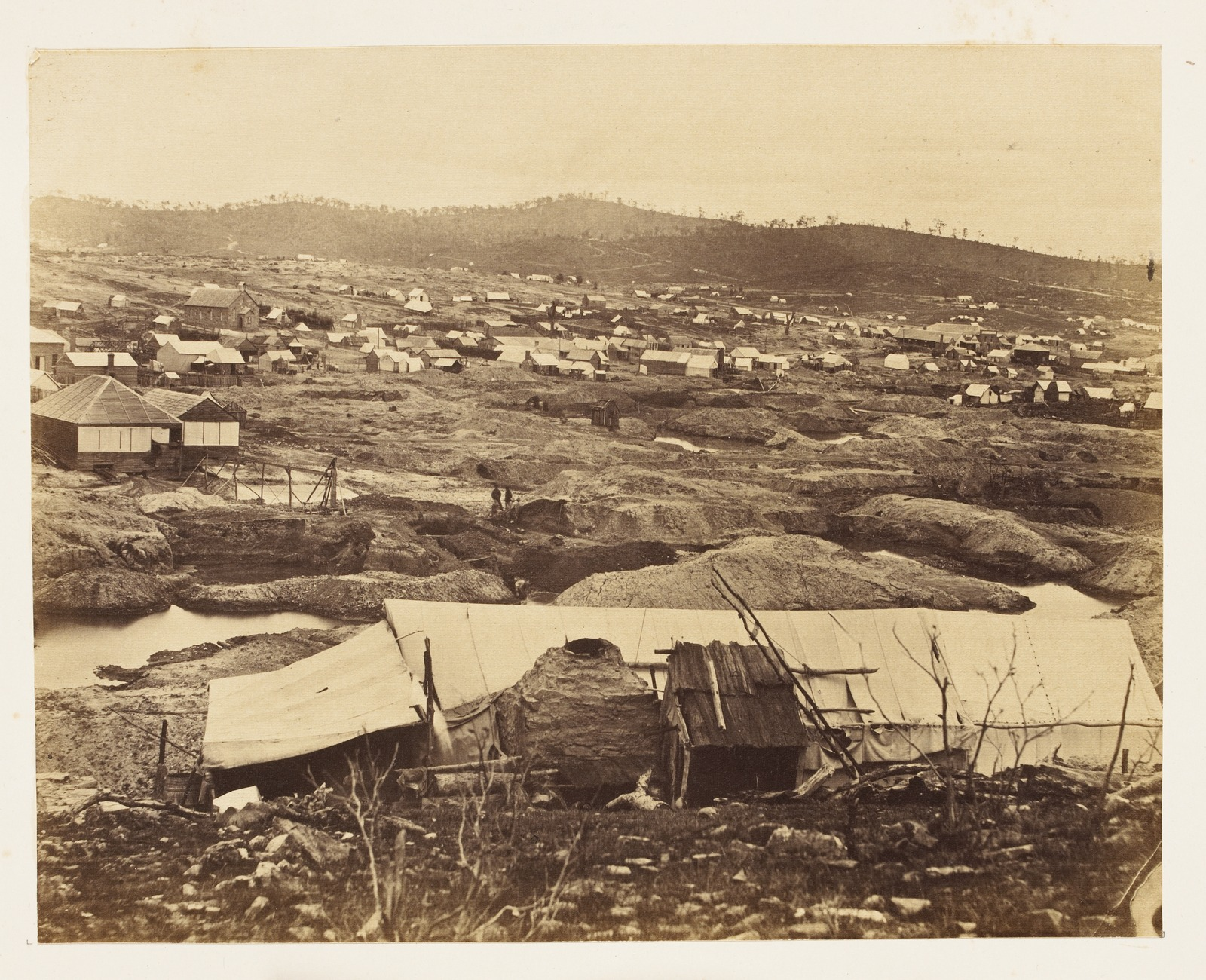
Richard Daintree (1858) The diggings from Old Post Office Hill. State Library Victoria pictures collection.

The first small village developed at Chewton, today in effect a suburb of Mount Alexander Shire, which included the Commissioner's tent, stores, an office for The Argus newspaper, and an office for the Mount Alexander goldfields' own newspaper the Daily Mail.

On 28 January 1852 William Henry Wright was one of nearly 200 men who were assigned or affirmed as territorial magistrates for Victoria. Not long after, he took control of the Mount Alexander diggings and set up a government camp on Forest Street near the junction of Barker and Forest Creeks (today's Camp Reserve). This was to be the new township of Castlemaine. The first reference in a newspaper to the township is found in the Geelong Advertiser of 13 March 1852 with the following notice:

"The Lieutenant Governor has appointed John Fletcher, Esq., J.P., to be Police Magistrate at Castlemaine; but where Castlemaine is situate[d] we cannot tell."

A court house was established on what is today known as Goldsmith Crescent, Castlemaine near the new government camp. Stores were also established nearby.

The first official post office at Castlemaine, named "Forrest Creek", opened on 1 March 1852. (Renamed the Castlemaine Post Office on 1 January 1854.) The first official Post Office was established after The Argus (Melbourne) correspondent at Forest Creek had an article published in November 1851 that put the case forward for a Post Office to be established somewhere between the Forest Creek goldfield and Kyneton. At the same time (November 1851) he described the Forest Creek diggings as having many businesses such as stores and licensed hawkers and "at least 8000 persons on the two creeks (Forest and Barker)". The need pointed out in The Argus in November 1851 had resulted in an unofficial Post Office being established on the diggings at Chewton (Forest Creek) in December 1851, a Post Office then described as being "on the most central part of the diggings".

On 15 February 1853 town lots were offered for sale. By that time the first Castlemaine District Hospital had been opened, the jail had been built, and Castlemaine was moving from 'tent' town to bricks and mortar. Notable prominent businesswoman Fanny Finch was running a restaurant and lodging house at Forest Creek at this time.

A local government was formed on 23 April 1855 and was later to become the Town of Castlemaine and in 1965 became the City of Castlemaine. However, with municipal amalgamations in the early 1990s, Castlemaine lost its 'City' status and is now simply the largest town in the Shire.

The Theatre Royal opened in 1856 to provide entertainment for the gold diggers, with a notable performance being provided by the world-renowned Lola Montes and her celebrated Spider Dance. It remains mainland Australia's oldest continuously operating theatre.

In 1859 the historic Castlemaine Football Club was established. Evidence makes it the second oldest football club in Australia and one of the oldest football clubs in the world.

=== After the gold rush ===
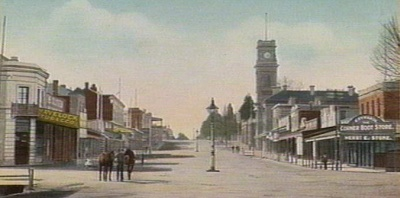
Barker Street, Castlemaine in 1908

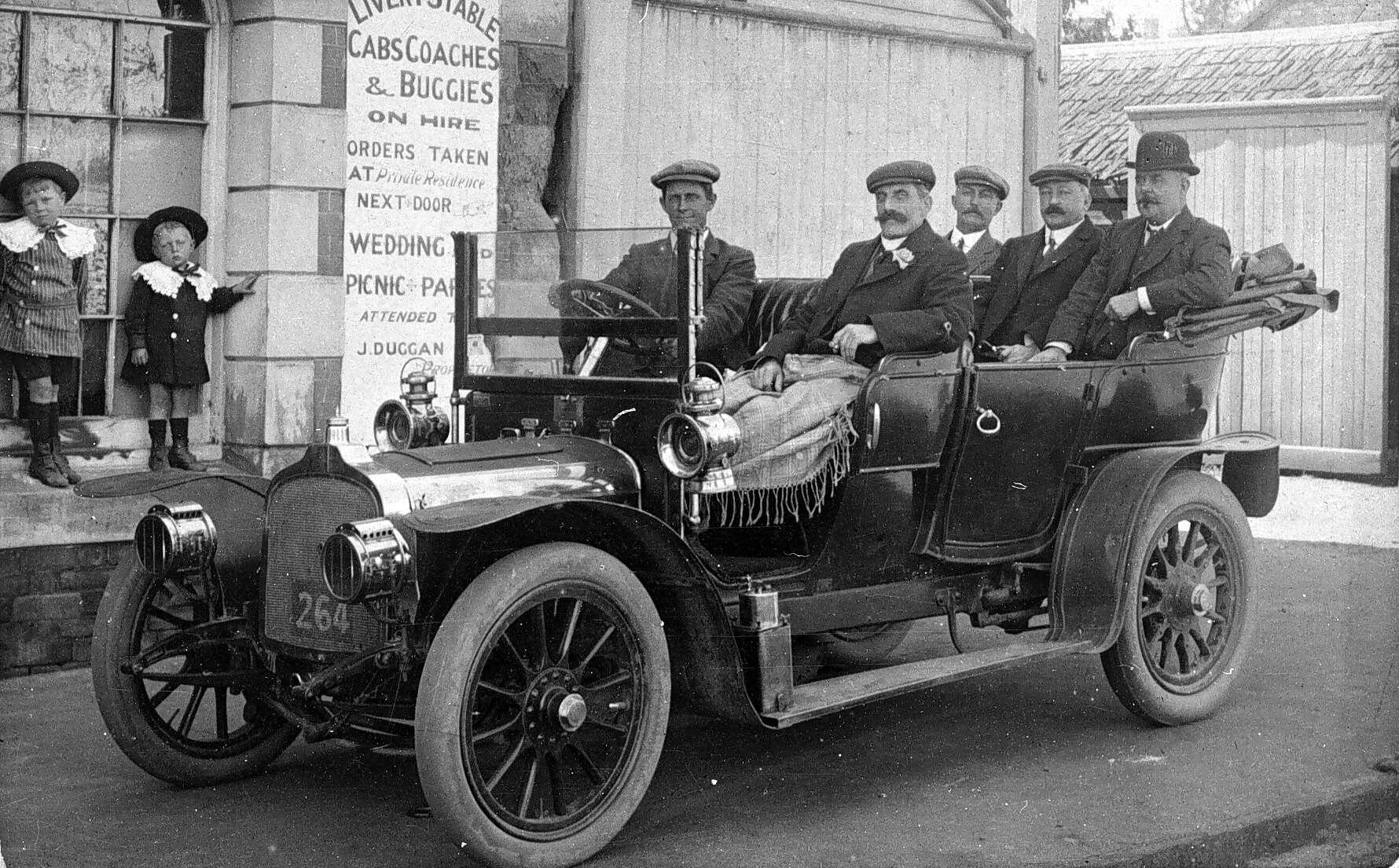
Adolphus Verey (c.1911) Gentlemen's Motoring Party Outside Duggan's Livery Stables, Castlemaine, Victoria

In 1877–80 the residences numbered over 2000, and there was a population in the township of 7,500, forming an electorate in itself, within the district, the County of Talbot, of 19,000 people. Four trains ran daily to and from Melbourne with fares at 13 shillings (A$80 value in 2021) for First Class, and 8s. 6d. (A$52.70) for Second.

As gold mining gradually ceased a number of other secondary industries sprang up. These included breweries, iron foundries and a woollen mill. Thompson's Foundry (now trading as Flowserve) was one of Castlemaine's largest employers.

From the 1970s the industries that had dominated employment in the town for a century began to decline, with many factories closing and others such as Thompson's Foundry significantly downsizing. This led to the displacement of large numbers of people, with many families leaving in search of jobs elsewhere. The area's precious goldrush history and heritage was, however, increasingly recognised, along with its notable population of arts practitioners. Substantial planning and activity helped create new industries in heritage tourism, arts tourism, nature tourism and so on. As a result, Castlemaine began to be visited – and settled – by more 'outsiders', primarily from Melbourne.

Some of these more recent arrivals added to the gentrification of the Victorian era town, helping to preserve its already charming country aspect and enhancing it by establishing a number of cafes and restaurants. As with much gentrification, however, consequent rising house prices placed increased economic pressure on many earlier inhabitants who sometimes struggle to continue living in the area. The town has, overall, taken on a fresh lease of life, combining some of the more desirable aspects of urban Melbourne with the charm and openness of old Castlemaine.

== Geography ==
Castlemaine is nestled in a valley. The urban area extends to several suburban areas, north toward Barkers Creek, west to McKenzie Hill, east to Moonlight Flat and Chewton and south to Campbells Creek.

=== Climate ===
Climate data for Castlemaine Prison (1991–2020, extremes 1966–2021); 330 m AMSL; 37.08° S, 144.24° E
Month	Jan	Feb	Mar	Apr	May	Jun	Jul	Aug	Sep	Oct	Nov	Dec	Year
Record high °C (°F)	45.0 (113.0)	43.9 (111.0)	38.5 (101.3)	34.0 (93.2)	25.8 (78.4)	21.1 (70.0)	21.4 (70.5)	24.7 (76.5)	28.9 (84.0)	34.5 (94.1)	40.1 (104.2)	43.0 (109.4)	45.0 (113.0)
Mean daily maximum °C (°F)	28.3 (82.9)	27.8 (82.0)	24.5 (76.1)	20.0 (68.0)	15.7 (60.3)	12.6 (54.7)	11.8 (53.2)	13.1 (55.6)	15.8 (60.4)	19.5 (67.1)	22.9 (73.2)	25.7 (78.3)	19.8 (67.6)
Mean daily minimum °C (°F)	13.5 (56.3)	13.6 (56.5)	11.1 (52.0)	8.0 (46.4)	5.7 (42.3)	4.0 (39.2)	3.4 (38.1)	3.6 (38.5)	5.3 (41.5)	6.9 (44.4)	9.6 (49.3)	11.3 (52.3)	8.0 (46.4)
Record low °C (°F)	0.8 (33.4)	2.5 (36.5)	0.6 (33.1)	−3.0 (26.6)	−2.6 (27.3)	−4.9 (23.2)	−6.3 (20.7)	−4.1 (24.6)	−4.0 (24.8)	−2.3 (27.9)	0.0 (32.0)	1.0 (33.8)	−6.3 (20.7)
Average rainfall mm (inches)	42.3 (1.67)	38.7 (1.52)	30.8 (1.21)	36.1 (1.42)	54.3 (2.14)	61.6 (2.43)	58.7 (2.31)	63.0 (2.48)	61.6 (2.43)	48.6 (1.91)	52.0 (2.05)	39.0 (1.54)	586.7 (23.11)
Average rainy days	6.2	5.3	6.0	7.3	11.3	13.6	16.3	15.7	13.5	10.4	8.7	7.2	121.5
Average afternoon relative humidity (%)	40	39	42	49	61	69	68	62	58	50	45	41	52
Source 1:
Source 2:

== Governance ==
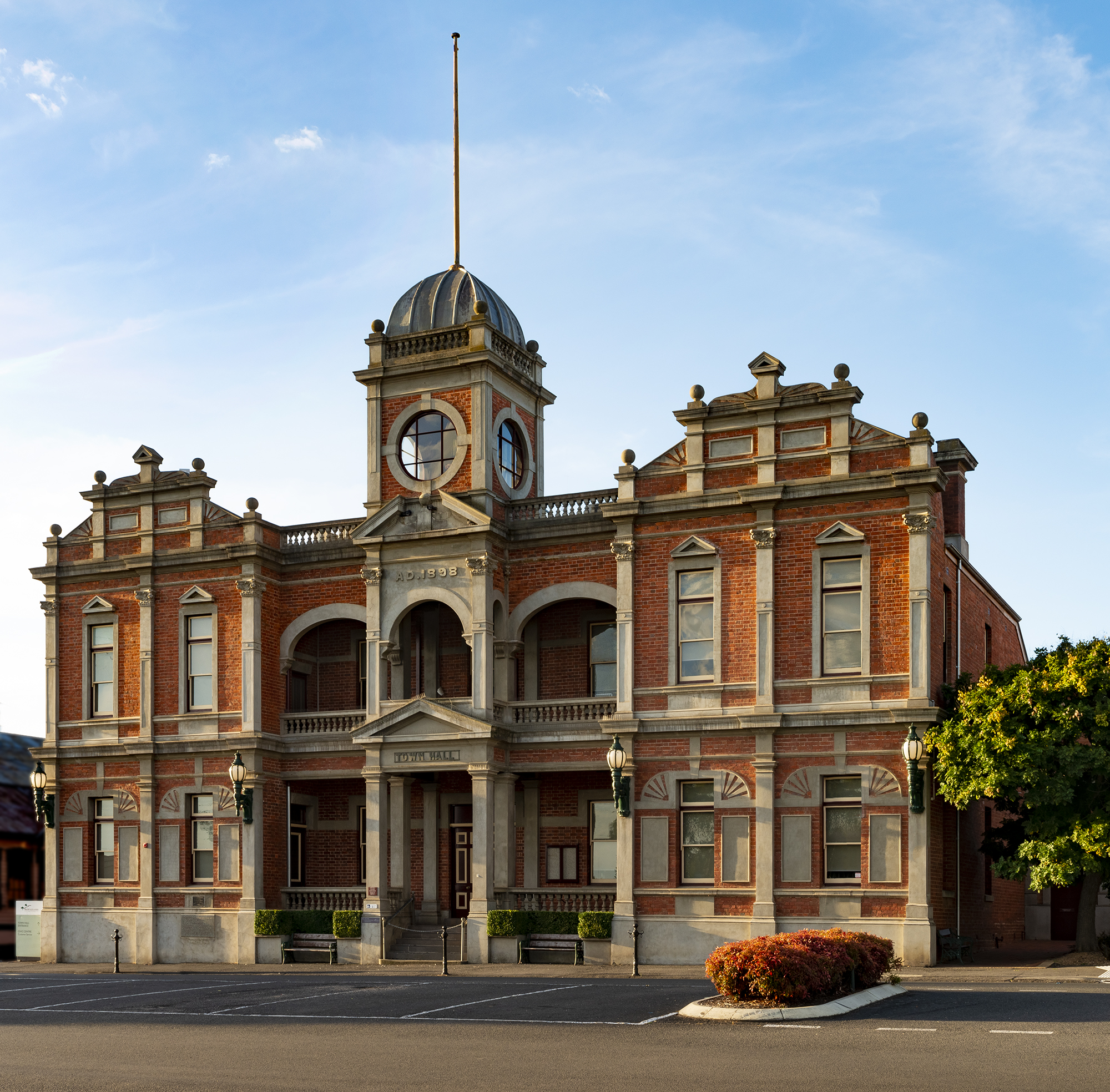
Castlemaine Town Hall, 1898

In local government, the Castlemaine region is covered by the Shire of Mount Alexander. The council was created in 1995 as an amalgamation of a number of other municipalities in the region with the Council and Civic Centre in the former School of Mines, in central Castlemaine, next to the original town hall. Castlemaine Town is represented by the Castlemaine Ward. The Loddon River Ward is centred around the township of Newstead. The Tarrengower Ward is centred around the township of Maldon. The Calder Ward is centred around Harcourt. The Coliban Ward covers the villages of Chewton, Elphinstone and Taradale.

In state politics, Castlemaine is located in the Legislative Assembly districts of Bendigo West currently held by the Australian Labor Party.

In federal politics, Castlemaine is located in a single House of Representatives division – the Division of Bendigo. The Division of Bendigo has been an Australian Labor Party seat since 1998.

== Economy ==
Castlemaine's largest industry is in manufacturing, particularly food manufacturing.

The biggest employer is KR Castlemaine (formerly the Castlemaine Bacon Company, established 1905), producing smallgoods with over 900 employees.

Cultural and heritage tourism is another large industry in Castlemaine, with the historic art gallery being a major drawcard.

Castlemaine has joined the likes of nearby Daylesford with gaining tourism from Melbourne, offering an array of local cafes and bars which have increased the region's appeal.

Castlemaine is also home to the Castlemaine Rod Shop (CRS), a company known Australia-wide for its aftermarket components for Holden, Ford and many others, especially Australian-made vehicles.

== Heritage ==
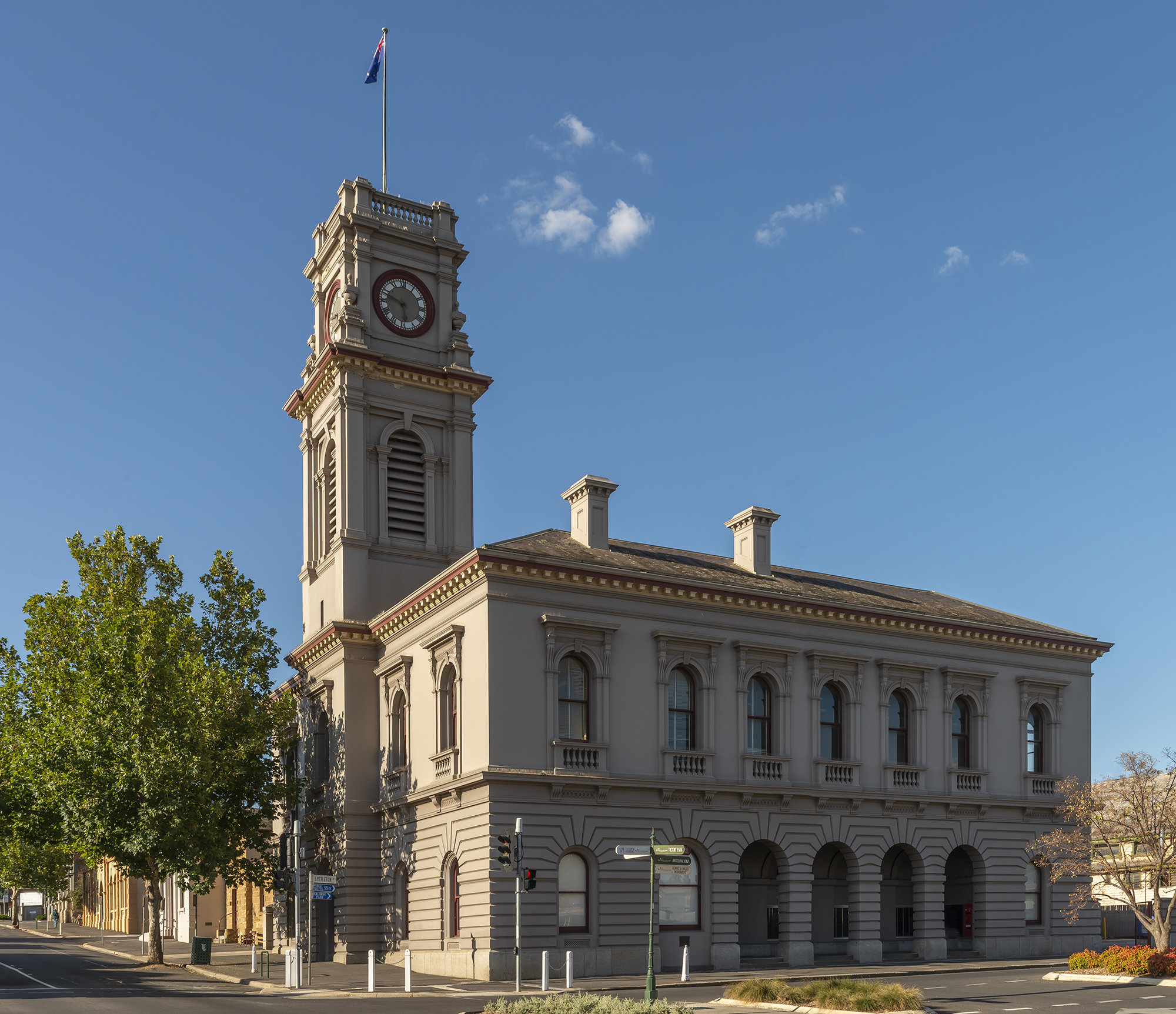
Post Office, Castlemaine, built 1874

The Castlemaine goldfields' legendary prosperity raised expectations of Castlemaine becoming Victoria's second city. That is reflected in imposing buildings erected in the town's first few years. Though the rich alluvial diggings were largely exhausted within 15–20 years causing the town's population to shrink after the 1870s, a rich legacy remains in the form of its buildings and intact nineteenth-century streetscapes comprising public buildings as well as simple miners' cottages. The historic area tells the history of Castlemaine in relics of significance, including the former steam flourmill (now The Mill), the Anglican church and the Congregational church. Despite the town's topographical limitation to the valley at the confluence of two creeks, broad streets and grand buildings convey an atmosphere of spaciousness.

=== Barker Street ===
Named after William Barker, the pioneer pastoralist whose run included part of the land which is now Castlemaine, the whole eastern side of Barker Street, between Templeton Street and Lyttleton Street, has been classified by the National Trust of Australia (Vic). Adjacent to the solicitors' offices is the library, built in 1857 as a mechanics' institute with additions in 1861, 1872 and 1893. Next to it is the old telegraph office (also 1857), and next adjacent is the Faulder Watson Hall which opened in 1895

On the Lyttleton Street corner of Barker Street is the decorative Neoclassical post office (1873–75). It is in the form of an Italian palazzo with a central clock tower, five arched bays and strongly contrasting colouration. This structure replaced a wooden post office which was built on this same spot in 1859 when the service was transferred from the gold commissioner's camp. Over the road is the Cumberland Hotel (1884).

=== Town hall ===
At 25 Lyttleton Street is the Castlemaine Town Hall, a design submitted by Wilkinson and Permewan successfully for an 1898 competition, and repeated by them in the Eaglehawk Town Hall in 1901. Constructed by H D McBean, builder of many substantial buildings in Castlemaine, including part of the hospital and Thompson's foundry, it cost £2,000. Essentially a Queen Anne building with elements of Dutch Renaissance, its complex eclecticism is typical of the period. Constructed of face red brick and coloured cement dressings (now painted white) and a tiled roof, it is pavilion-planned. Dutch-Flemish architecture inspires the gabling of the projecting wings, the verticality of the windows and the superimposed post-and-lintel system with Tuscan and composite capitals, while the panelling and representation of fans to the side of the lower windows is unusual. Two storeys of pedimented porticos stacked in top of each other form the central element with a 'broken' upper pediment, while the vertical line is continues above a balconied parapet, completed by a square tower with glazed circular openings on all four sides, surmounted by an onion dome.

=== Imperial Hotel ===
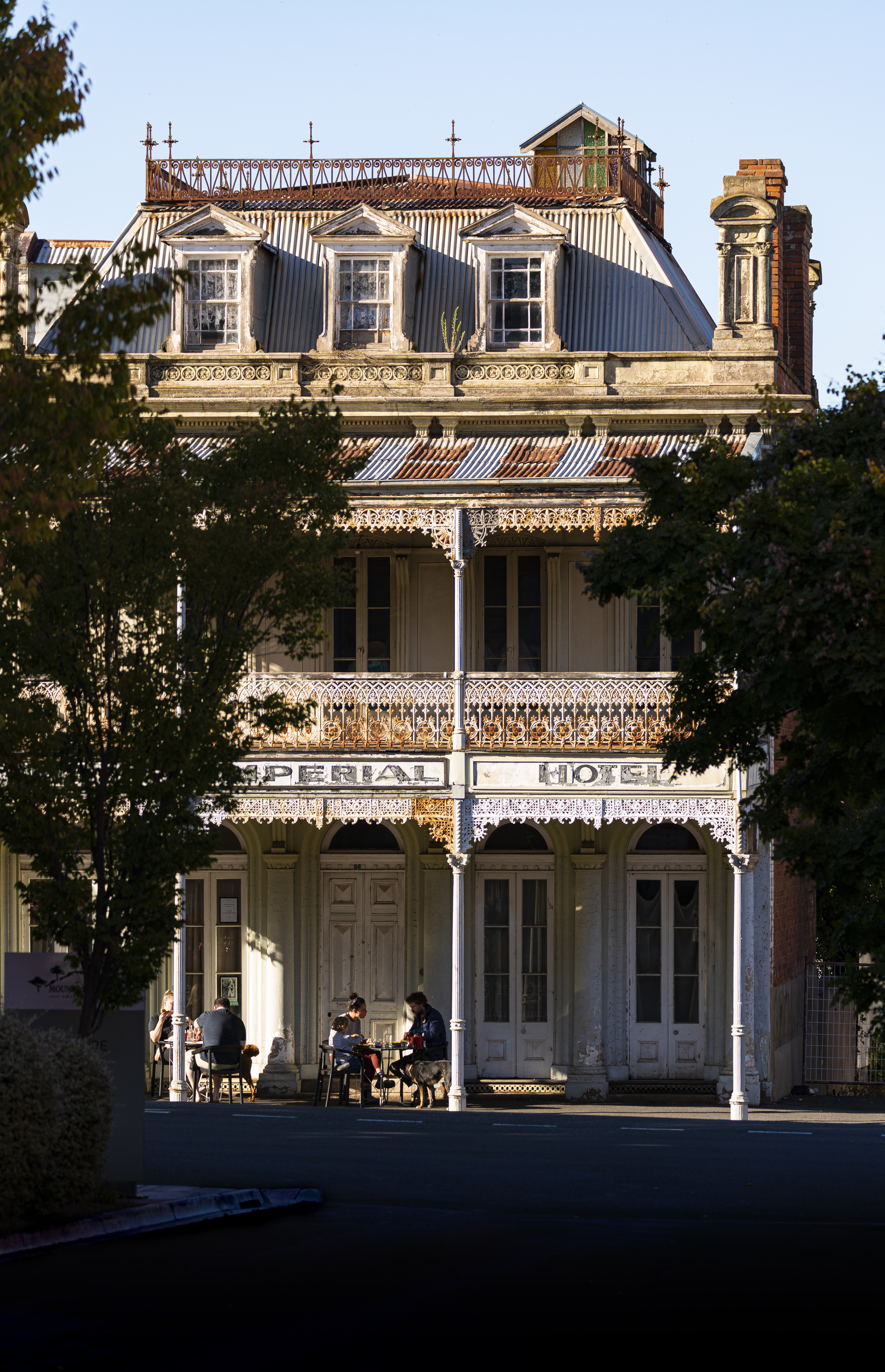
The 1861 Imperial Hotel Castlemaine

Opposite the town hall is the Imperial Hotel, a thirty-room, two-storey hotel with attic erected in 1861 for Faulder Watson at a cost of £4,000 and classified in 1982 by Heritage Victoria which describes it as "one of the most innovative classical revival buildings in Victoria". The sophisticated design in French Renaissance style by leading Melbourne architects Purchas and Swyer (the Glenara homestead at Bulla is also their work), is rare in a building of the early 1860s. The iron crested mansard attic storey, elaborate detailing of both the corner chimneys, and pedimented dormer windows of the street and side elevations make the Imperial Hotel historically significant as one of the more distinctive hotel buildings in Victoria and a critical component in an important historic townscape.

=== Art gallery and museum ===
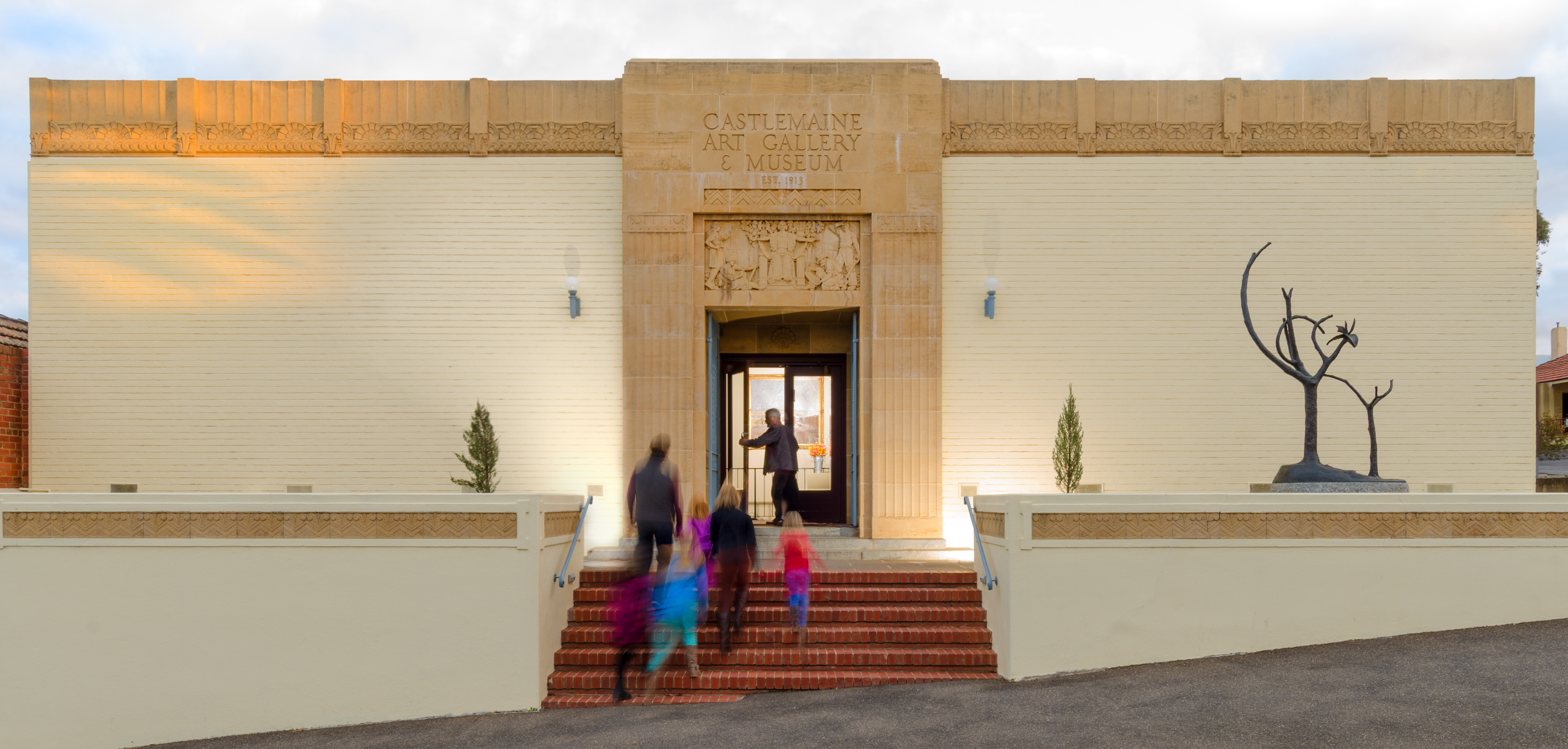
Castlemaine Art Museum, built 1931

On 17 November 1983 the Castlemaine Art Museum at 14 Lyttleton Street was classified by the National Trust which notes its significance as "an exceptional building in its intent and execution and ... historically important as one of the earliest examples of the 'modern movement' in provincial Victoria". Despite the onset of the Depression, £3,250 was raised in only six weeks from private individuals and local companies, augmented by state government grants totalling £1,500, which together covered the total cost of £4,132. Architect Percy Meldrum's design in an American Art-deco style was constructed by local builder Frank Pollard in local brick, slate and granite, by April 1931 for the official opening, free of debt. It consisted of a main gallery behind two smaller galleries and with the museum in the basement with storerooms. The gallery walls are naturally and indirectly lit from concealed windows of a saw-tooth roof above suspended ceilings. A "jazz" style frieze decorates the parapet, front wall and tympanum over the central front door, itself recessed behind ornate wrought-iron grille gates above which is a bas-relief in artificial stone by Orlando H. Dutton. Extensions were made at the rear in 1960, 1973, 1987 and 2000.

=== Market building ===
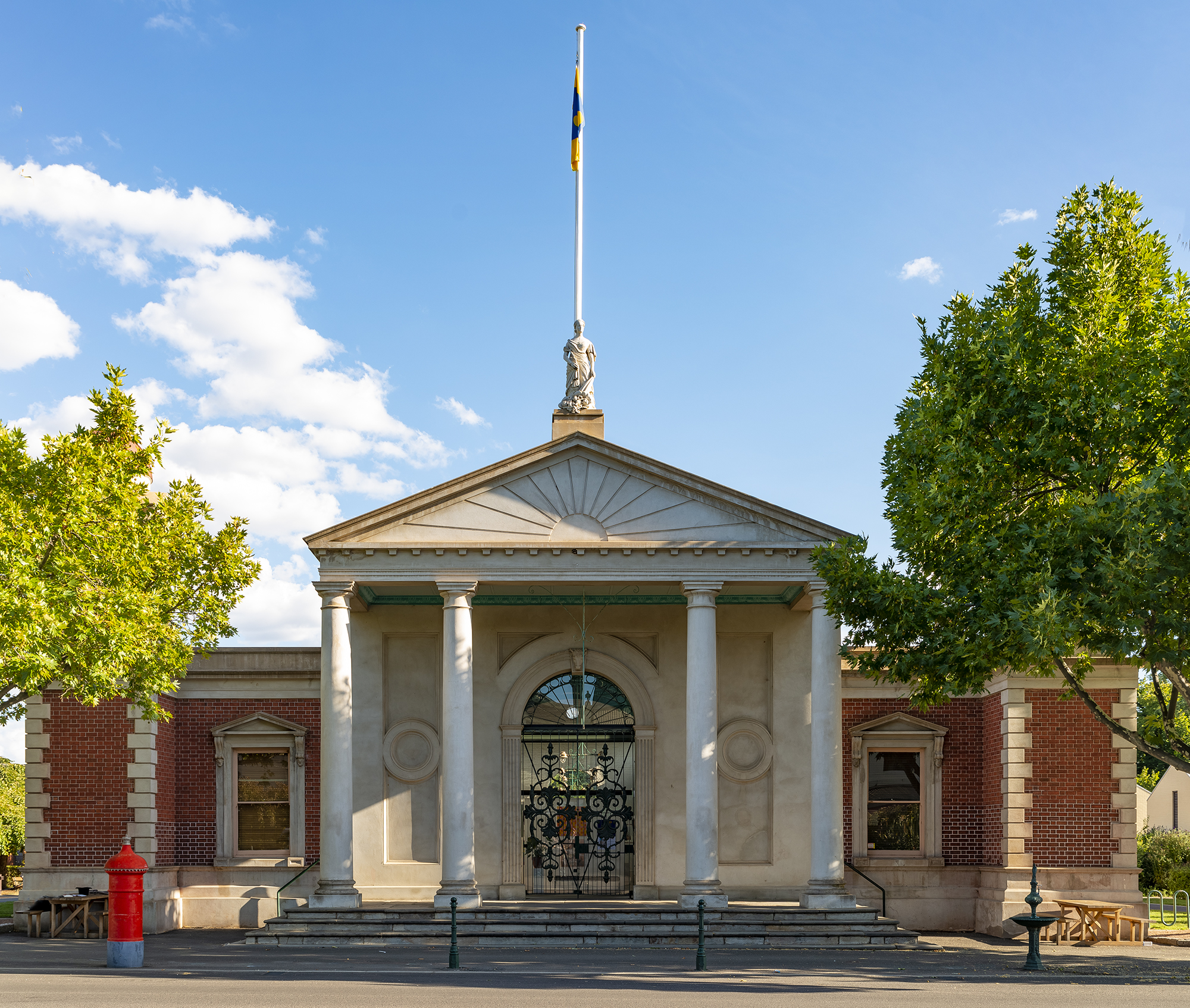
Market Building, Castlemaine, built 1862

The Castlemaine Market building at 44 Mostyn Street, facing the main shopping strip, is a rare example of such buildings and, according to the Victorian National Trust, is one of the most important in the country. An 1861 design of town surveyor William Beynon Downes, it is one of the most distinctive classical revival buildings in Australia. It was classified on 11 December 1958, then acquired by the National Trust in 1967 which restored it from a dilapidated condition. Its symmetrical elevation features a tuscan portico, round headed entrance and roundels. The pediment, simply decorated with a rising sun motif, bears a statue of Ceres, the goddess of agriculture, between two towers with cupola crowns. A clerestory lights the interior from above deep side wings which are 'arcaded' and capped by a cornice. A landmark in the historic townscape, exemplifying the period when the temporary town became permanently established, it now serves as the tourist centre.

== Parks and open space ==
Castlemaine has its own botanical gardens, established in 1860, which are on the Victorian Heritage Register. The gardens feature Lake Joanna (an artificial lake), many exotic tree species and structures dating to the Victorian era. The Castlemaine public swimming pool is 50m in length and is located next to the botanical gardens.

The Castlemaine Diggings National Heritage Park is the first of its kind in Australia. It embraces gold rush relics and bushland. Home to rare and threatened species of both flora and fauna it offers opportunities for bush walking, bird watching, wildlife monitoring and study while providing a bush setting for the township.

== Culture ==
=== Library ===
Housed in an historic building, the Mechanics Institute at 212 Barker Street in which it was established in 1857, the Castlemaine Library held 4,781 volumes in 1877, and since 1996 has expanded its services and offerings and access to 222,931 items (in 2021–22) as part of the North Central Goldfields Regional Library Corporation which services also the City of Greater Bendigo, Loddon Shire and Macedon Ranges Shire; an area of 12,979 square kilometres. The shire contributes a budget of around $500,000. The Castlemaine branch is the most subscribed of all the NCGRL branches with 53% (10,687) of the Mount Alexander Shire population holding a library card and having used the library over any two-year period. The building, administered and maintained by the shire, also houses the 231-seat Phee Broadway Theatre and a foyer exhibition space.

=== Castlemaine State Festival ===
Since 1976, Castlemaine has biennially been the home of the Castlemaine State Festival. Running for ten days, the festival is one of Victoria's most notable regional arts events. It was originally held over the Melbourne Cup period in November before it lost $130,000 in a clash in 1996 with the October Melbourne Festival instituted by then state premier Jeff Kennett. He compensated in part for its consequent losses with a grant of $41,800. Subsequently, it is now usually held in late March. It offers visual and performing arts and attracts internationally and nationally renowned performers, including the Melbourne Symphony Orchestra.

=== Public art gallery ===
See Castlemaine Art Museum

=== Theatre ===
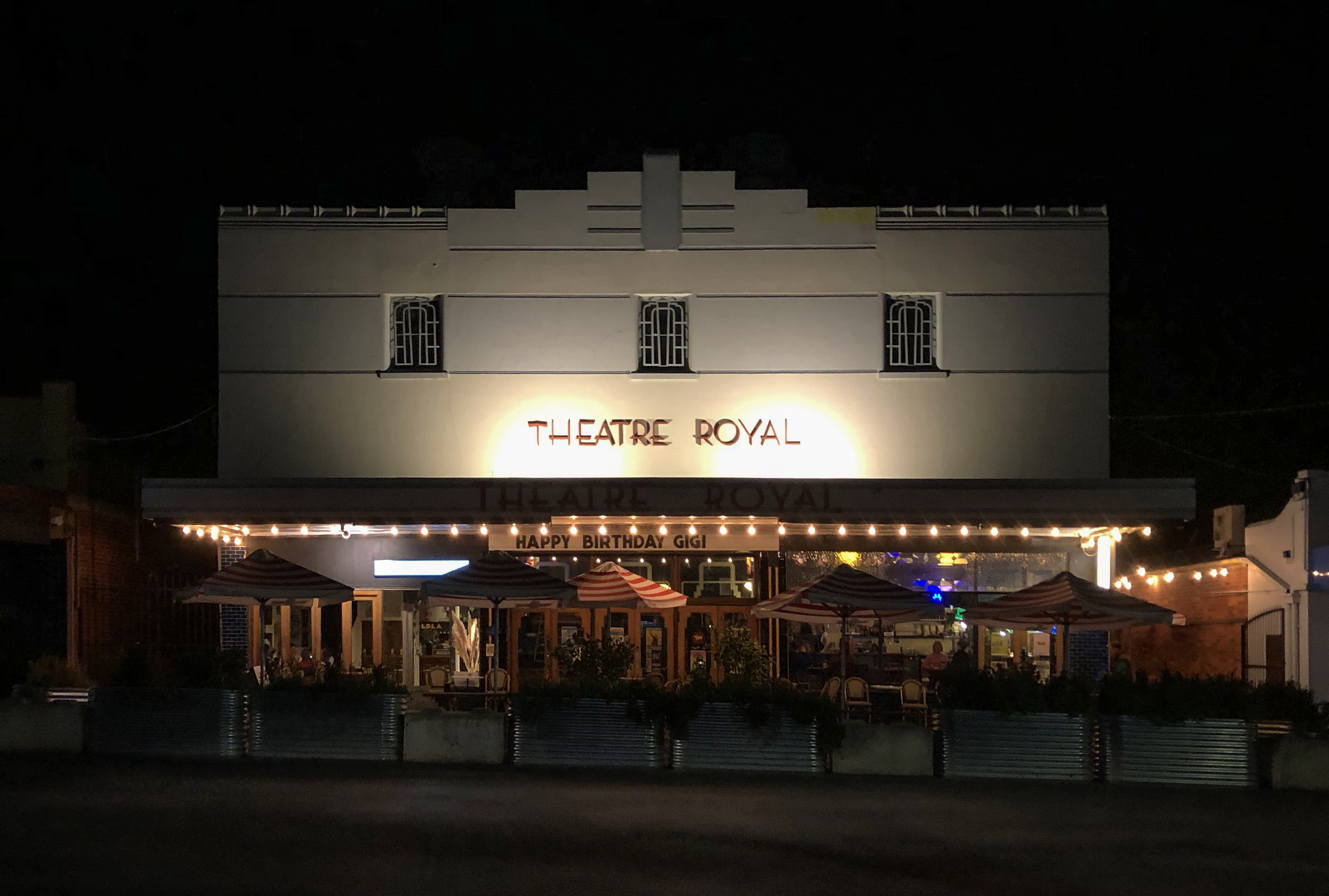
Theatre Royal at night

The Theatre Royal claims to be the oldest continuously operating theatre in mainland Australia. It hosts films (including several world and Australian premieres), concerts and functions.

=== Buda Historic Home and Garden ===
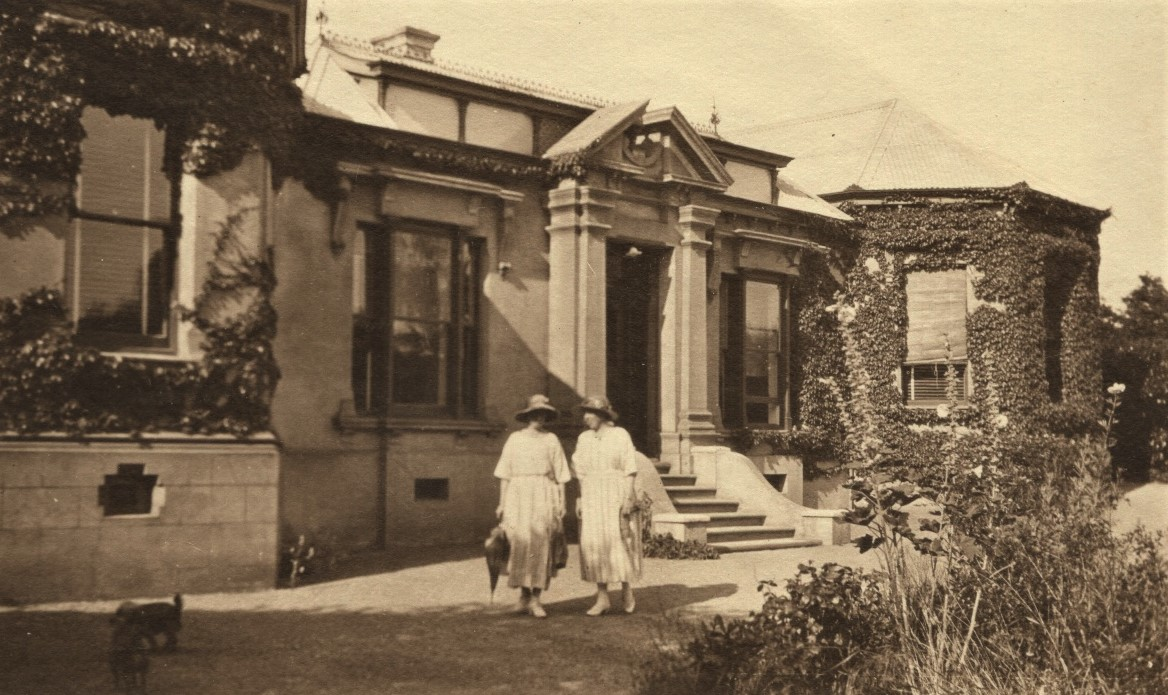
Buda Historic Home and Garden in c.1920

See Buda Historic Home and Garden

== Community ==
=== Castlemaine Farmers Market ===
Castlemaine also hosts a local farmers market where the finest producers of the Mount Alexander Shire region, all in one place. The market is currently held on the Western Reserve, Forest Street, Castlemaine

=== Wesley Hill Community Market ===
The Wesley Hill Community Market operates every Saturday from 9a.m. to 2 pm. It is located at 149 Pyrenees Highway, Castlemaine, and has up to 40 stalls selling a range of merchandise, local products and farmers' products.

=== The Mill ===
The 1875 woollen mill beside Barkers Creek opposite the Botanical Gardens survived three major fires and was, in its last incarnation, the Victoria Carpets factory (est. 1993) which closed in 2013. Currently its 8,500m^{2} is occupied by ceramics and art studios, art puff gallery, and number of retail and food businesses including Das Kaffeehaus and coffee roastery, winemakers and brewery, baker, green-grocer, meat, cheese and dairy delicatessens, chocolatier, ice creamery, cabinet-makers, perfumery, woolwear, mosaicist, florist, Castlemaine Vintage Bazaar for vintage, hand-made and second hand goods, a Pilates studio and gymnasium, as well as the offices of architects and sustainable building designers, wellbeing clinics, filmmakers and others.

=== Churches ===
Second Chinese joss house, Ten Foot Hill, Castlemaine

As a gold rush town, Castlemaine attracted migrants from all over the world. So in addition to 'established' churches such as the Anglicans, Presbyterians and Roman Catholics, arrivals in the district included Methodists, Baptists and Congregationalists from mining areas in provincial Britain where nonconformist churches were more popular, as well as Lutherans from continental Europe. Initially the churches in Victoria were unable to cope with huge numbers of migrants settling in areas which had been sparsely populated. However a few proactive clergymen set out for the diggings where they were assisted by lay preachers amongst the diggers. Initially they preached in tents and from tree stumps but by 1853 the first rough churches had been built.

There was also a sizeable Chinese population with concomitant joss houses and temples; besides a few artifacts, no structures remain.

Churches to have operated in Castlemaine in order of establishment are:

- Methodist: 1850s–1977 when it merged as part of the Uniting Church of Australia
- Anglican: 1850s–present
- Roman Catholic: 1853–present
- Presbyterian: 1850s–1977 and 1984–2023. The Castlemaine congregation merged as part of the Uniting Church in 1977, but some members later broke away to re-establish that denomination in the town
- Baptist: 1861?–present
- Congregational: 1800s–1977 when it merged as part of the Uniting Church
- Church of Christ: 1800s–present
- Lutheran: 1800s to present.
- Salvation Army: Late 1800s to present
- Seventh Day Adventist
- Uniting Church: 1977–present. Absorbed the local Methodist, Presbyterian and Congregational churches, although some Presbyterians broke away in 1984 to re-establish a Presbyterian presence in the town
- Pentecostal: Grace Church, Liberty Christian Life Centre in Campbell Creek (affiliated with the Assemblies of God)
- Coptic Orthodox, 2025

The Uniting Church was created in 1977 and the local Methodist, Presbyterian and Congregational congregations chose to join. Since the Presbyterians had the largest church building, the best hall and largest grounds, the merged denominations met there. The Methodist and Congregational buildings were sold, with the Adventists taking over the former Methodist church and a conservative group that wished to re-establish a distinct Presbyterian service moving into the former Congregational church building over the road from their original church.

== Sport ==
Australian rules football and netball is popular, with the Castlemaine Football Club competing in the Bendigo Football League.

On Wesley Hill, just out of Castlemaine, is the Castlemaine sporting complex, which hosts a range of sport including basketball, netball, badminton and cycling. Castlemaine Tennis Club on Wheeler Street next to Forest Creek features four plexipave courts and eight further synthetic grass courts. Castlemaine has many cricket teams in the town itself and the surrounding area. It is also renowned for its mountain bike trails, with a reputedly world-class, newly developed multi trail walking and cycling facility on the slopes of Mount Alexander at nearly Harcourt. Two golf courses are available; at the Castlemaine Golf Club in the bordering Muckleford region on Newstead Road, and at the course of the Mount Alexander Golf Club on Wimble Street.

Castlemaine is also the self-proclaimed Hot Rod centre of Australia, with many small businesses catering to this popular form of motor sport at a national level. Examples of the cars can be seen on show days and rod runs throughout the year. There are plans for a permanent Hot Rod centre.

=== Run the Maine ===
Held annually in October, Run the Maine is a fun run event around the Castlemaine Botanical Gardens which raises funds for the local hospital – Castlemaine Health. Participants can choose to run 5.5 km, 11 km or a 14 km trail run. The 2020 event was run virtually, with runners uploading their times individually due to COVID-19.

== Infrastructure ==
=== Correctional facilities ===
The shire has three prisons: HMP Loddon and HMP Middleton for men are located on the eastern outskirts at Wesley Hill and HMP Tarrengower for women is outside Maldon.

=== Education ===
==== Primary schools ====
Castlemaine and its outlying areas have eight primary schools catering for prep to year 6 (and beyond for the two independent schools).

From north to south they are:

- Castlemaine North Primary School. (Usually known as North School.) No 2051. Opened 1878, successor to a state funded Wesleyan school operating since 1853
- St Mary's School. (Roman Catholic.) Opened 1854, current building completed 1962. Operated by Sisters of Mercy until 1984, the last nuns left in 1988.
- Castlemaine Primary School, (Usually known as South School.) No 119. Opened 1855, present main building completed 1875.
- Winters Flat Primary School. No 652. Opened 1860, current buildings opened 1964.
- Castlemaine Steiner School. (Independent) previously a kindergarten on other sites from 1988, moved from Maldon to its current site at 11 Rilens Rd, Muckleford, 1996.
- Chewton Primary School. No 1054. Opened 1870, present building completed 1911.
- Olivet Christian College, Campbell's Creek. (Independent.) Established 1979, ceased operation on 31 December 2024
- Campbell's Creek Primary School. No 120. Opened 1853, present building completed 1878.

==== Secondary schools ====
The town is served by Castlemaine Secondary College which was created in 1994 by combining the former Castlemaine High School (established 1910) and the Castlemaine Technical College (established in 1887 as the Castlemaine School of Mines). The Junior Campus of the Secondary College was at Milkmaids Flat at the northern end of the town on the old High School site, while the Senior Campus occupied the former Tech College site at Norwood Hill to the south of the town. These campuses have now merged at the former Junior Campus and incorporate a Steiner education stream. The Norwood Hill site has been re-purposed as Autoplex Castlemaine (a project of Castlemaine Hot Rod Centre Limited) and as a business incubation project by Workspace Australia.

- St Gabriel's College, a Roman Catholic secondary school operated between 1906 and 1974 on a site adjoining St Marys primary school.
- Castlemaine Grammar School opened prior to 1865 and operated from a building in Hargraves St until 1910.

=== Fire brigade ===
Castlemaine Fire Brigade at Market Square, Castlemaine in 1861

After a fire at a baker's, Castlemaine Fire Brigade, one of the oldest on the continent, was founded at the town's Victoria hotel on 1 December 1854, named the 'Castlemaine Voluntary Fire Brigade,' and funded with five hundred pounds raised by voluntary subscription. Arthur Beauchamp was elected its first Chairman, and H. M. Boswarva secretary, on 6 December, and steps were taken to ensure its water supply from a well in Market Square. Both a voluntary and a council-funded municipal brigade co-existed by 1861. The voluntary Brigade has operated continuously since, and at 2024 had 52 members who respond to about 150 callouts per year.

Its 'fire books', recording standardised details of fires, date back to the 1870s. Fire scientists and climate researchers are finding invaluable their information that reveals insights into population expansion, the developing insurance industry, community history and changes in the environment.

=== Health ===
A large hospital and a geriatric care centre Dhelkaya Health (previously Castlemaine Health, and formerly Mount Alexander Hospital) is located on the north-western edge of Castlemaine. The former Maldon Hospital is now home to older and frail residents in the Jessie Bowe Centre and Mountview Centre.

The Castlemaine District Community Health Centre provides a range of health services (including a Needle & Syringe Program) and there are several large medical general practices. Primary care options include dentists, opticians, physiotherapists, podiatrists, chiropractors, pathology and hearing services, plus a substantial number of complementary and alternative practitioners.

=== Transport ===
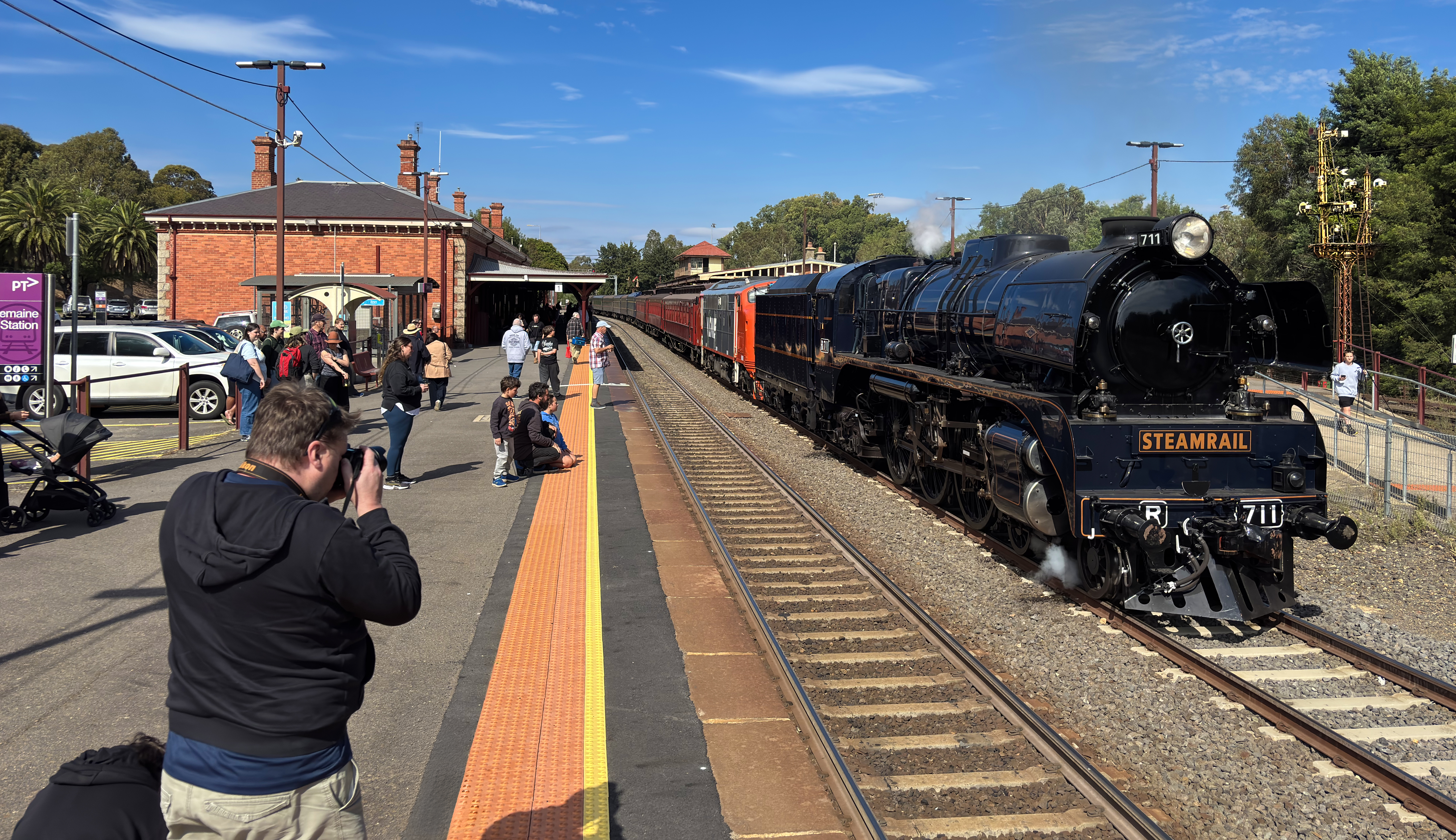
Castlemaine station, looking south

==== Road ====
Castlemaine is at the junction of several main roads including the Pyrenees Highway running west connecting it to Maryborough and east toward Elphinstone, the Midland Highway running north connecting it to Bendigo and south connecting it to Daylesford and Maldon-Castlemaine Road, running north west toward Maldon.

==== Rail ====
V/Line rail services operate out of the Castlemaine railway station which is on the Bendigo railway line. V/Line operates VLocity services to Melbourne's Southern Cross station, the fastest weekday express taking 65 minutes. Travel to Bendigo by train takes a minimum of 18 minutes. The station is also served 4 times daily, twice in each direction, by V/Line's N Class Diesel locomotives and N-Type carriages, which operate services to and from Swan Hill

The Victorian Goldfields Railway operates a tourist railway with refreshment rooms at Castlemaine station, running old steam and diesel engines from Maldon station to Castlemaine via Muckleford, on a line on which it was possible until 1970 to travel through to Shelbourne. Historically, connections through Castlemaine could be joined for journeys to Maryborough (until 1977) on the Moolort Line for Ballarat, St Arnaud, Donald, Woomelang; and via Bendigo to Deniliquin in New South Wales (the latter section being now only for freight).

==== Bus ====
V/Line coach services between Castlemaine and Maryborough, and Castlemaine and Ballarat, also operate out of Castlemaine railway station. Castlemaine Bus Lines provides suburban bus services from Castlemaine railway station to Chewton, Campbells Creek and North Castlemaine as well as intercity services to Maldon, Elphinstone and Taradale.

==== Taxi ====
The local taxi service is run by Castlemaine Taxis, with a taxi rank outside the Market Building, Mostyn Street.

== Media ==
The weekly Castlemaine Mail, which began as the Mount Alexander Mail in 1854, became part of The Midland Express group in 1984 and is still issued in paper and online, edited by Lisa Dennis.

Community radio station MainFM broadcasts from the old Castlemaine Hospital and broadcasts on 94.9FM.

== Notable residents ==
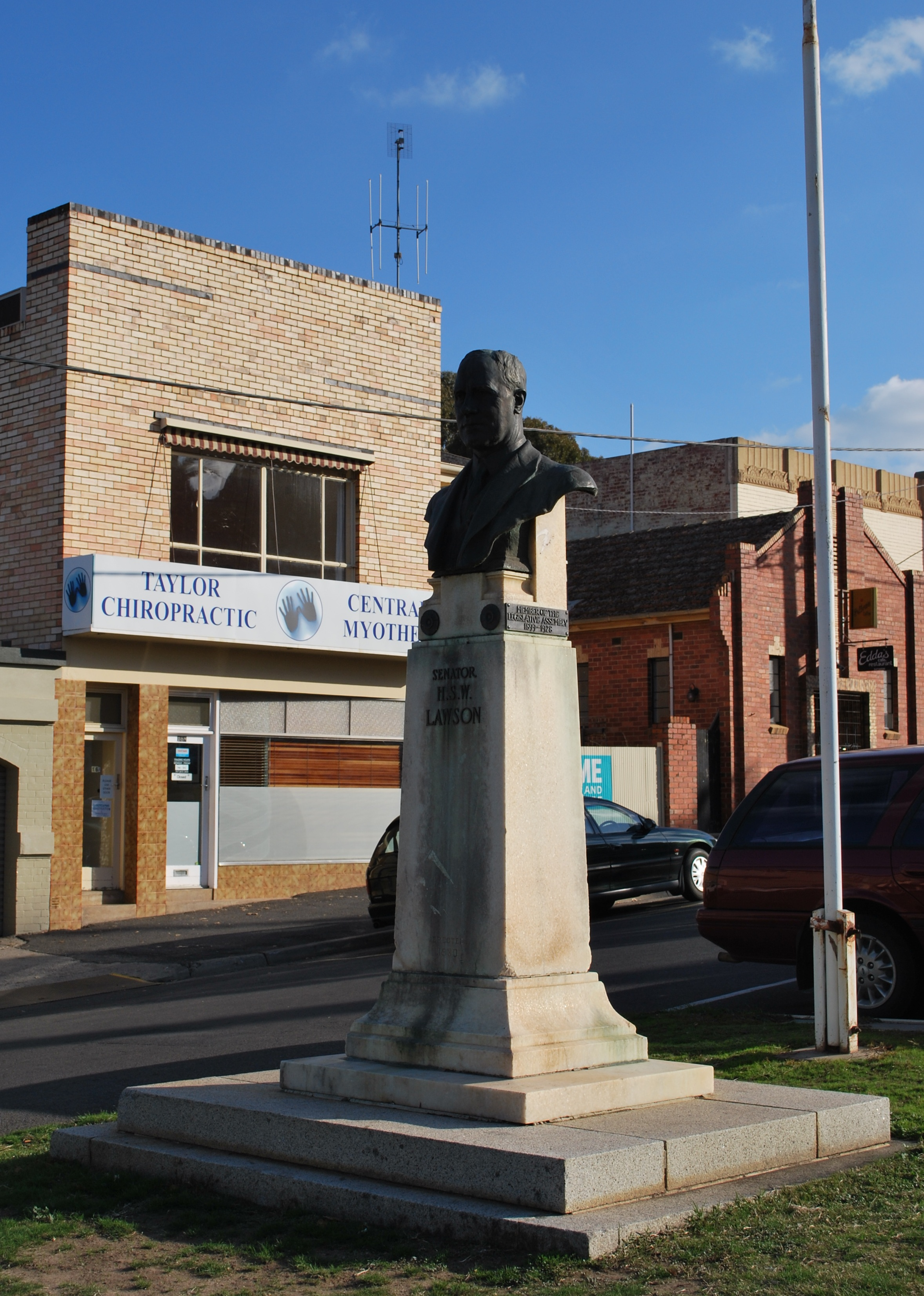
Bust of Harry Lawson, Premier of Victoria 1918–1923

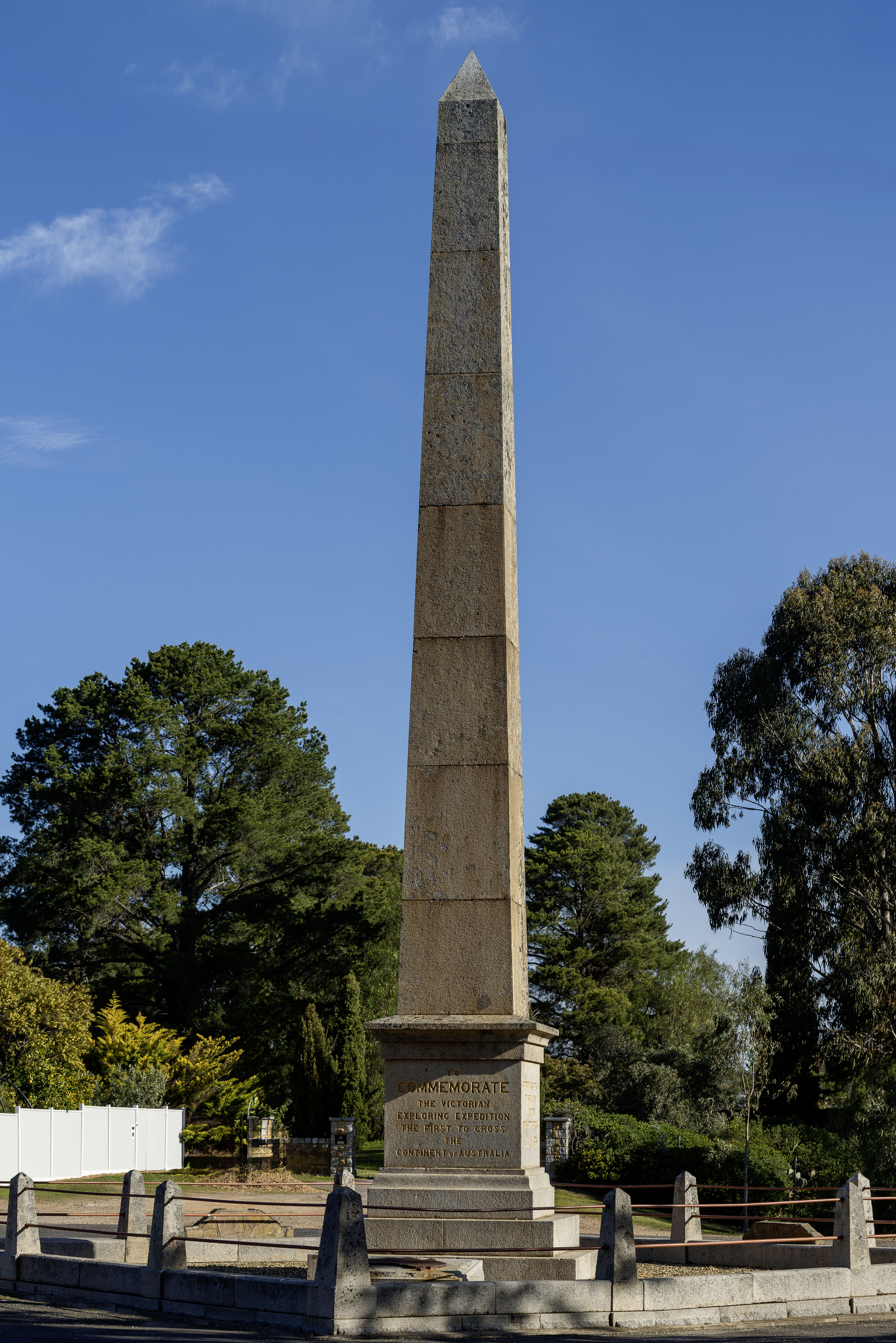
Burke and Wills expedition monument, Castlemaine

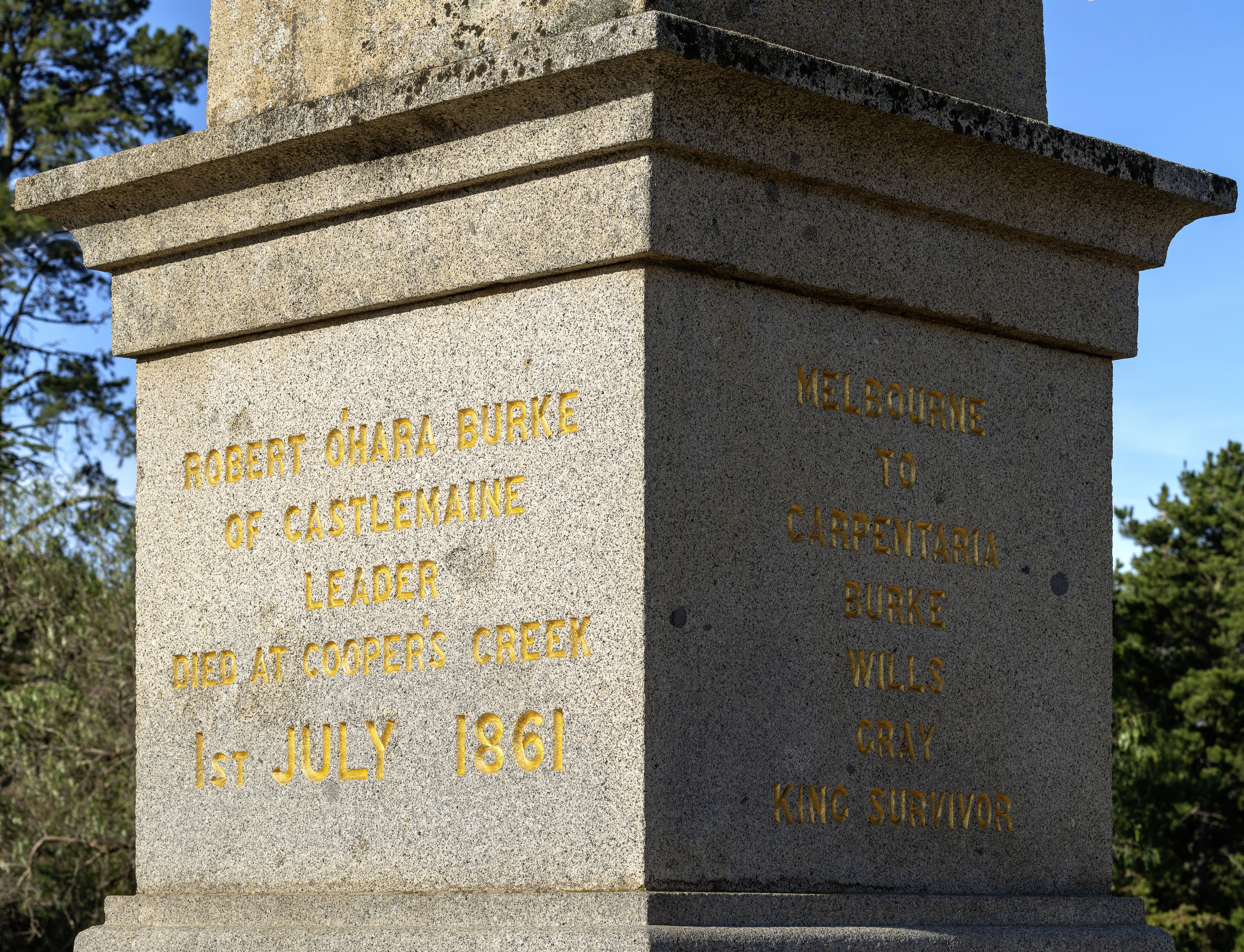
Burke and Wills expedition monument, Castlemaine inscriptions of west and south sides

- David Andrew, politician
- Bud Annand, Australian rules footballer with St Kilda
- John Arthur, politician
- Alice Marian Ellen Bale, artist
- Ron Barassi, Australian rules footballer from Guildford within the shire
- Elsie Barlow, artist
- Walter Barnes, politician
- William Bennett, headmaster, teacher and teachers' representative
- Les Bogie, Australian rules footballer
- Winnie Brotherton, a founder of Castlemaine Art Museum, Red Cross volunteer, Girl Guide leader and botanical collector
- Robert O'Hara Burke, leader of the Burke and Wills expedition, stationed in Castlemaine as police superintendent from 1858 to 1859
- Mary Card, crochet designer
- Frederick Coldrey, co-inventor with Alfred Fenton of the collodion print on leather
- Richard Edmond Courtney, army officer
- Robyn Davidson, adventurer and writer
- Bill Ebery, politician
- John Simeon Colebrook Elkington, public health advocate
- Edward Henry Embley, doctor and anesthesia researcher
- Mary Fairburn, musician and illustrator
- John Field, brigadier
- Sean Finning, champion cyclist
- John Gray, politician
- Jack Ginnivan, Australian rules footballer for the Hawthorn Football Club,
- Peter Hall, politician
- Thomas Sergeant Hall, geologist and director of the Castlemaine School of Mines (1890–93)
- Eric Harrison (RAAF officer)
- Sir John Michael Higgins (1862–1937), metallurgist, government adviser and company director, born at Eureka Reef, and remembered in the Higgins gallery at Castlemaine Art Museum
- Philip Ingamells (1947–2023), conservationist
- Bertha Jorgensen, concert violinist
- Patricia Kailis (1933–2020), geneticist, born in Castemaine
- KIAN, singer and songwriter, who won Triple J's Unearthed High in 2018
- Walter Langslow, politician
- Frank Laver, Test cricketer
- Sir Harry Lawson, Premier of Victoria
- Ernest Leviny, clock maker, gold/silver smith (1818–1905)
- Martin Lewis, artist
- Dustin Martin, Australian rules footballer for Richmond and Brownlow Medallist
- Beatrix Waring McCay, solicitor, barrister, magistrate
- Frank McEncroe, creator of the Chiko Roll
- Alex Miller, Miles Franklin Award-winning author
- Alec Morgan, Australian rules footballer,
- Lucy Newell, artist
- James O'Brien, politician
- Ben Oliver, cricketer
- Steven Oliver, former Carlton footballer and candidate in the 2010 Victorian state election
- Roy Parkin, Australian rules footballer
- David Parsons, racing driver
- Sir James Patterson, Premier of Victoria
- Walter Peeler, Victoria Cross recipient
- Vincent Pyke, politician
- Reg Pollard, politician
- Jaala Pulford, politician
- Sir Stephen Henry Roberts, historian and vice chancellor of the University of Sydney, attended Castlemaine High School
- Margaret Sabine, virologist
- Jessie Satchell, politician
- Jim Sheehan, trade unionist and politician
- Sam Drummond, writer and disability activist
- Dawn Sime, artist
- William John Sowden, journalist
- Harvey Sutton, athlete and physician
- Ned Sutton, Australian rules footballer
- Frank Tate, Victoria's first director of education, a position he held for 26 years
- Charles Tait, film director
- Edward Joseph Tait, theatrical entrepreneur
- Nevin Tait, concert promoter and film producer
- Jack Titus, AFL footballer for Richmond, AFL Hall of Famer and RFC club 'Immortal'
- Adolphus Verey, photographer
- Christian Waller, printmaker and stained glass artist
- Eric Westbrook, director of the National Gallery of Victoria
- George Whaley, actor
- Lillian Wheeler, actor
- Mal Williams, Australian rules footballer
- Susie Williams, educator

== In popular culture ==
The Australian version of the Irish ballad "The Wild Colonial Boy" refers to 1860s' Australian convict John (or Jack) Doolan, who was "born in Castlemaine", and who turned to bushranging.

Castlemaine XXXX beer and HMAS Castlemaine were named after the city.

The Australian Broadcasting Corporation TV series Glitch was partially filmed in Castlemaine. The fictional town of Yoorana in which the series is set is located on the western side of (and effectively replaces) Castlemaine, per an onscreen map.

A film with actor Liam Neeson was also shot in Castlemaine in 2025.

== See also ==
- Das Kaffeehaus
- HM Prison Loddon
- Box–ironbark forest
- Castlemaine Art Museum
- Buda Historic Home and Garden
- Mount Alexander Shire
- Victorian gold rush
