= Roy Parkin =

Australian rules footballer (1904–1957)

Personal information
- Full name: Walter Roy Parkin
- Born: 18 July 1904; Castlemaine, Victoria
- Died: 18 February 1957 (aged 52); Tweed Heads, New South Wales
- Height: 179 cm (5 ft 10 in)
- Weight: 79 kg (174 lb)

Playing career^{1}
Years	Club	Games (Goals)
1926	Richmond	1 (0)
- ^{1} Playing statistics correct to the end of 1926.

Walter Roy Parkin (18 July 1904 – 18 February 1957) was an Australian rules footballer who played with Richmond in the Victorian Football League (VFL).

== Family ==
The son of Walter Parkin (1859–1937) and Annie Helen Parkin (1863–1939), née Cardwell, Walter Roy Parkin was born at Castlemaine, Victoria on 18 July 1904.

Roy Parkin married Jean Casey in Queensland on 30 April 1934.

== Football ==
Parkin was a full-back from Castlemaine who played all his country football in the same team as former Richmond rover Jack Fincher. Parkin's solitary VFL game was in Round 1 1926 against South Melbourne but his performance did not receive good reviews and he did not play another senior game.

== Death ==
Roy Parkin died in Tweed Heads on 18 February 1957.
