= Bertha Jorgensen =

Australian violinist and concertmaster

Bertha Jorgensen MBE
- Jorgensen in the 1920s
- Born: Bertha May Jorgensen; 17 May 1904; Castlemaine, Victoria, Australia
- Died: 11 January 1999 (aged 94); South Caulfield, Victoria, Australia
- Occupation(s): Violinist, concertmaster
- Employer: Melbourne Symphony Orchestra

Bertha May Jorgensen MBE (17 May 1904 – 11 January 1999) was an Australian violinist and concertmaster of the Melbourne Symphony Orchestra (MSO).

== Early life ==
Bertha May Jorgensen was born in Castlemaine, Victoria on 17 May 1904. She gave her first public performance there at age five, receiving "prolonged applause". She later travelled to Melbourne each week to study with Alberto Zelman. She was educated at St Catherine's School from 1910 to 1919.

== Career ==
Moving with her family to Melbourne, Jorgensen joined Zelman's Albert Street Conservatorium Orchestra (later the Melbourne Symphony Orchestra) at age 15. When appointed concertmaster of the orchestra in 1923, she was the first woman to lead a professional orchestra in Australia.

Jorgensen played and led the MSO under conductors, including Eugene Goossens, Walter Susskind, Rafael Kubelík, Malcolm Sargent and Thomas Beecham. Visiting conductors were "usually puzzled and slightly perturbed" to find a woman concertmaster. Otto Klemperer said that he was "perhaps doubtful" when he first met Jorgensen, acknowledging that she was "very good, yes as good as a man (better than some! . . . but this time I am NOT talking about Australian orchestras!)".

In 1952 Jorgensen travelled to Europe to hear and observe many of the famous orchestras, including the Vienna Philharmonic. At the time she was one of only two women concertmasters or major orchestras in the world. In 1954 she considered Argentine conductor Juan José Castro to be the best musician the MSO had worked with, because "every member of the orchestra felt that he knew the whole score, and not merely his own part".

In addition to her work with the MSO she was a frequent performer on radio broadcasts from 1925 through to the late 1950s. She also taught at the Melbourne Conservatorium of Music, standing in for French violinist Jeanne Gautier when she was on tour. At the end of WWII, Gautier returned to France, passing some of her pupils to Jorgensen and selling her 1780 François Fent violin.

In the 1960 Queen's Birthday Honours Jorgensen was appointed a Member of the Order of the British Empire for "service as leader of the Victorian Symphony Orchestra".

Jorgensen's career with the MSO spanned 50 years. She retired as acting concertmaster on 17 May 1969.

== Death and legacy ==
Jorgensen died in South Caulfield, Victoria on 11 January 1999. She was 94.

The University of Melbourne awards an annual scholarship, named the Bertha Jorgensen Exhibition, to the "most outstanding student of the violin in third or fourth year". Her alma mater, St Catherine's School, presents the Bertha Jorgensen Prize for Leader of the Orchestra annually.
