= Ned Sutton =

Australian rules footballer (1868–1911)

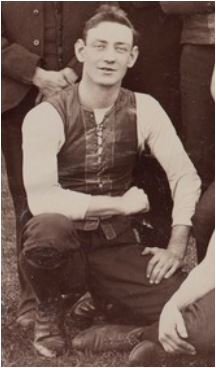

Personal information
- Full name: Edmund Hamilton Sutton
- Born: 24 March 1868; Loddon, Victoria
- Died: 2 June 1911 (aged 43); Malvern, Victoria
- Original team: University
- Position: Fullback

Playing career^{1}
Years	Club	Games (Goals)
1888–1893	Carlton (VFA)	101 (1)
1895–1896	Melbourne (VFA)	28 (1)
1897–1898	Melbourne (VFL)	32 (0)
Total		161 (2)
- ^{1} Playing statistics correct to the end of 1898.

Career highlights
- Melbourne captain: 1897–1898

Edmund Hamilton "Ned" Sutton (24 March 1868 – 2 June 1911), also called Ted Sutton, was an Australian rules footballer who played in the Victorian Football Association (VFA) and the Victorian Football League (VFL), predominantly as a backman.

He began his career with Carlton in the VFA and also played for Melbourne in the VFA, spending a year studying at Melbourne University before becoming Melbourne's inaugural VFL captain when the league was formed in 1897.

== Family ==
The son of Castlemaine gaol warder William Sutton (1838–1912), and Hannah Sutton (1837–1930), née Howe, Edmund Hamilton Sutton was born at Castlemaine on 24 March 1868.

He was the older brother of Olympic athlete and noted physician Harvey Sutton (1882–1963).

He married Elizabeth Purvis (1865–1926) in 1894. They had one child, a daughter (Nancy).

== Career ==
=== Carlton ===
Sutton joined Carlton in 1888. Carlton were a team competing in the VFA, at the time the top level Australian rules football competition in Victoria, and Carlton were a strong team, having won the VFA premiership the previous season. Sutton's first VFA match was on 18 August, against Williamstown at the MCG. He had a promising first season, becoming a reliable backman. Sutton played for the Blues from 1888 to 1894; during that time he was named one of Carlton's better players for the year in 1890, was vice-captain in 1892, and served on the committee in 1893. In 1890 Sutton travelled with Carlton to play two exhibition matches in New South Wales, to help promote the game.

=== Melbourne ===
After seven seasons with the Blues, Sutton was cleared by Carlton to move to Melbourne, who also played in the VFA, on 2 May 1895: the resulting dispute left him out of football in 1894. Sutton played with the Redlegs in the VFA from 1895 to 1896 and when Melbourne, along with his old club Carlton, became one of the VFL foundation clubs in 1897, Sutton was named as Melbourne's inaugural VFL captain. He played for Melbourne in the VFL for their first two seasons and was captain for both, having the unusual distinction of being captain of the club in all of the 32 VFL matches that he played. In the two seasons that Sutton was captain, Melbourne finished fourth and sixth respectively in the eight team competition. Sutton retired at the conclusion of the 1898 season.

=== Essendon ===
In 1900 he attempted a return to the football field and was granted a permit to play with Essendon, but he never played a senior game for them.

== Death ==
Ned Sutton died on 2 June 1911 at his parents home in East Malvern after a long illness.
