= William Bennett (headmaster) =

Australian teacher and teachers' representative

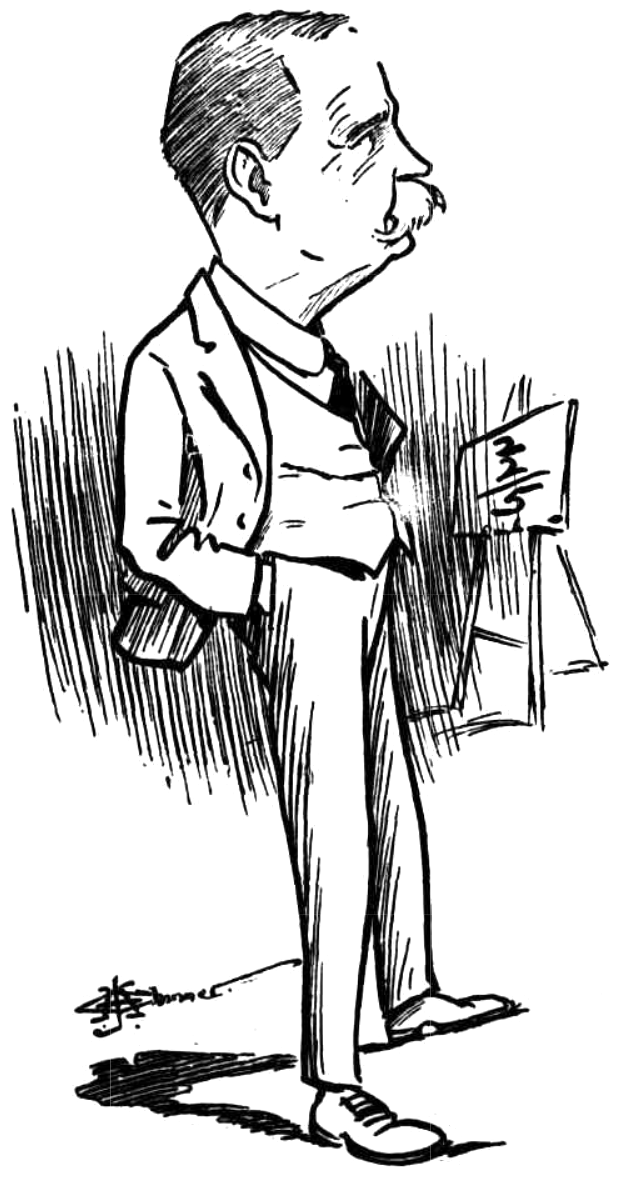
Caricature of William Bennett (headmaster)

William Bennett (1858 – 22 November 1934) was a teacher and teachers' representative in South Australia.

== History ==
Bennett was born at Castlemaine, Colony of Victoria. He moved to the Colony of South Australia in 1876 to take up a position of assistant teacher with that State's Education Department. Six years later he was appointed headmaster of the Moonta Mines School. In 1882 he enrolled at the Adelaide Teachers' Training College, and on completion was appointed first assistant at North Adelaide. He was then successively served as head teacher at Truro, Salisbury, Burra, Port Pirie, Thebarton, and Port Adelaide. In 1915 he was appointed headmaster of the Hindmarsh School, then in 1921 transferred to the newly-opened Norwood Central School and remained in charge there until 1928, when he retired.

Bennett was noted for his involvement with the State School Teachers' Union. He served three years as its treasurer, two years vice-president, and was twice president. He was for twelve years the teachers' representative on the Public Teachers' Classification Board, and also served on the board of the Public Teachers' Superannuation Fund. He was president of the South Australian Public Officers' Association.

== Other interests ==
After his retirement Bennett was active in the South Australian branch of the League of the Empire. He was also interested in the teacher exchange scheme which operated between South Australia and England. He kept in touch with its participants, both those in England and in Australia.

== Family ==
On 27 April 1886, while working at Truro, Bennett married fellow-teacher Annie Caroline Bennets (1861–1932). They had three sons, Francis Harold Bennett, born 1887 in Burra; and Alan William and Charles Gordon Bennett in Salisbury in 1889.
