= Frederick Coldrey =

Early Australian portrait photographer active c.1855 to 1889

- Born: 1827; Islington
- Died: 19 May 1889 (aged 61–62); Castlemaine

Frederick Henry Coldrey (1827, Islington – 19 May 1889, Castlemaine) was an early Australian portrait photographer active c.1855 to 1889.

== Biography ==
Born in the United Kingdom Frederick Coldrey probably had married Eleanor Louisa Lloyd (1828–1901) of Clerkenwell, by the time of the first record of him in Australia which was in Melbourne. There they lived in Collingwood where a son Henry Thomas Coldrey was born in 1854.

== Photographer ==
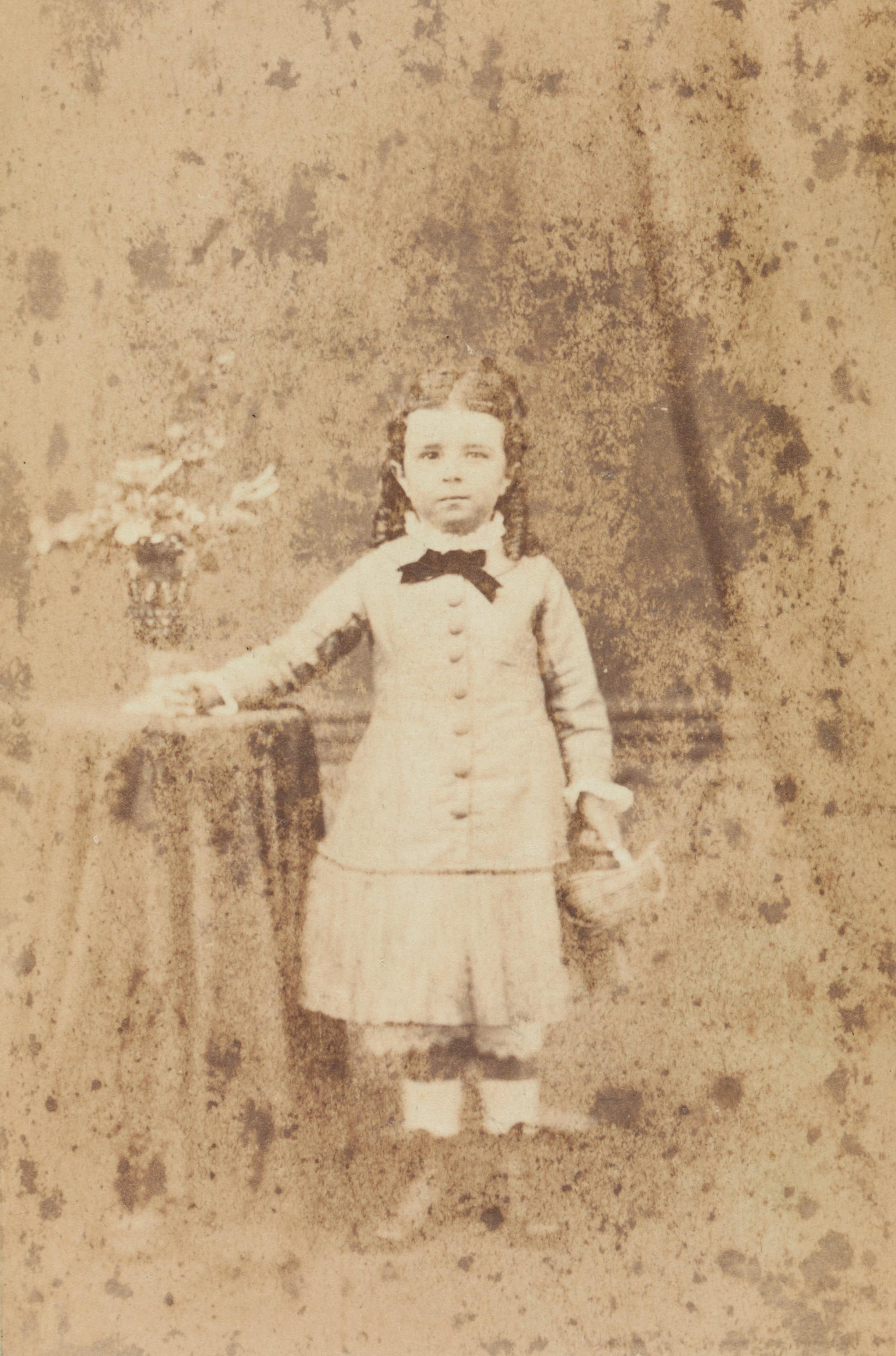
Frederick H. Coldrey (1880s) untitled carte-de-visite, National Gallery of Victoria, Melbourne

In about 1856 Coldrey opened a collodion studio in Ballarat with Alfred R. Fenton on the Main Road "adjoining the Bailarat Horse Bazaar." In 1857 he and Fenton (an enthusiastic amateur chemist who was likely the actual inventor) applied for a patent, effective 2 November, for a "new improvement in photography," a collodion print on black leather, known as a pannotype, which was promoted as convenient for posting; "Likenesses can be taken by this newly invented process on leather, and being once varnished, they become insensible to touch."

The procedure involved making an underexposed collodion negative, giving the added advantage for portraiture of a shorter exposure time, then transferring it from the original glass support to black oilcloth, leather or even wood, the result being an unbreakable photograph. Variations on the pannotype appear independently as a less fragile backing material was sought, and each practitioner used their own collodion recipe with good adhesion to its unusual substrate being the aim, so whether Fenton and Coldrey's application to leather was sufficiently unique to justify a patent is not recorded beyond their applying for one, and only days after The Age announcement of their invention, The Mount Alexander Mail reported on an announcement of photographs on leather being invented by a Mr Smith in Tain, Scotland. Other photographers took up its use, several in Sydney including Lawson Insley (1858), Alfred Winter (1859), and Henry Jones (1860); Frederick Frith in Melbourne (1861), G. M. Challinor in Hobart (1861), and Thomas Ham, Brisbane (1862). Few pannotypes remain, which historians Davies and Stanbury surmise is due to their having been posted overseas, surviving examples being of a quarter-plate size. The carte-de-visite replaced the pannotype within two years.

In Ballarat Coldrey was active in petitioning, with others, in support of nominations for the Municipal Council, and in calling for removal of some serving councillors, sporadic involvement in politics at a local level that he was to continue.

After the death in March 1859 of his sons 6 year-old Frederick Henry William and 5 year-old Henry Thomas, compounding misfortunes, including defaulting clients, a robbery, floods, and the departure of Fenton from the partnership, meant Coldrey, unable to pay rent, was declared insolvent in August 1860. An £11 8s debt remained after the auction of his equipment and possessions. He remained in Ballarat until c.1862, then worked with Bendigo-based John W. Burrows as an itinerant photographer across the state from Avoca to Jerilderie.

== Castlemaine ==
Coldrey joined Charles Wherrett and his assistant W. G. Cearns in Castlemaine as an ‘operator’ at a studio known for its ‘spirit photographs’, until 1874 and likely departing on the death of Cearns and Wherrett's relocation to Hobart in 1871, before taking up management of Kerr's Portrait Rooms a few doors away in Barker St. which he rented from H. Winks. There he made a living from cartes-de-visite portraits, which he sold at 7s 6d per dozen copies, "ivory" type copies being 10 shillings per dozen, and portraits on glass from one shilling each. He offered life size enlargements of cartes de visite then being achieved with the solar enlarger.

To his studio business he added an employment agency and secured a wine licence. He enjoyed minor celebrity for his ‘glee’ singing around town. He acted as auditor for Mount Alexandershire Co., Boatswain's Gully mine, and he took interest in municipal affairs and the Independent Order of Oddfellows benevolent society, to which he was appointed guardian in 1887.

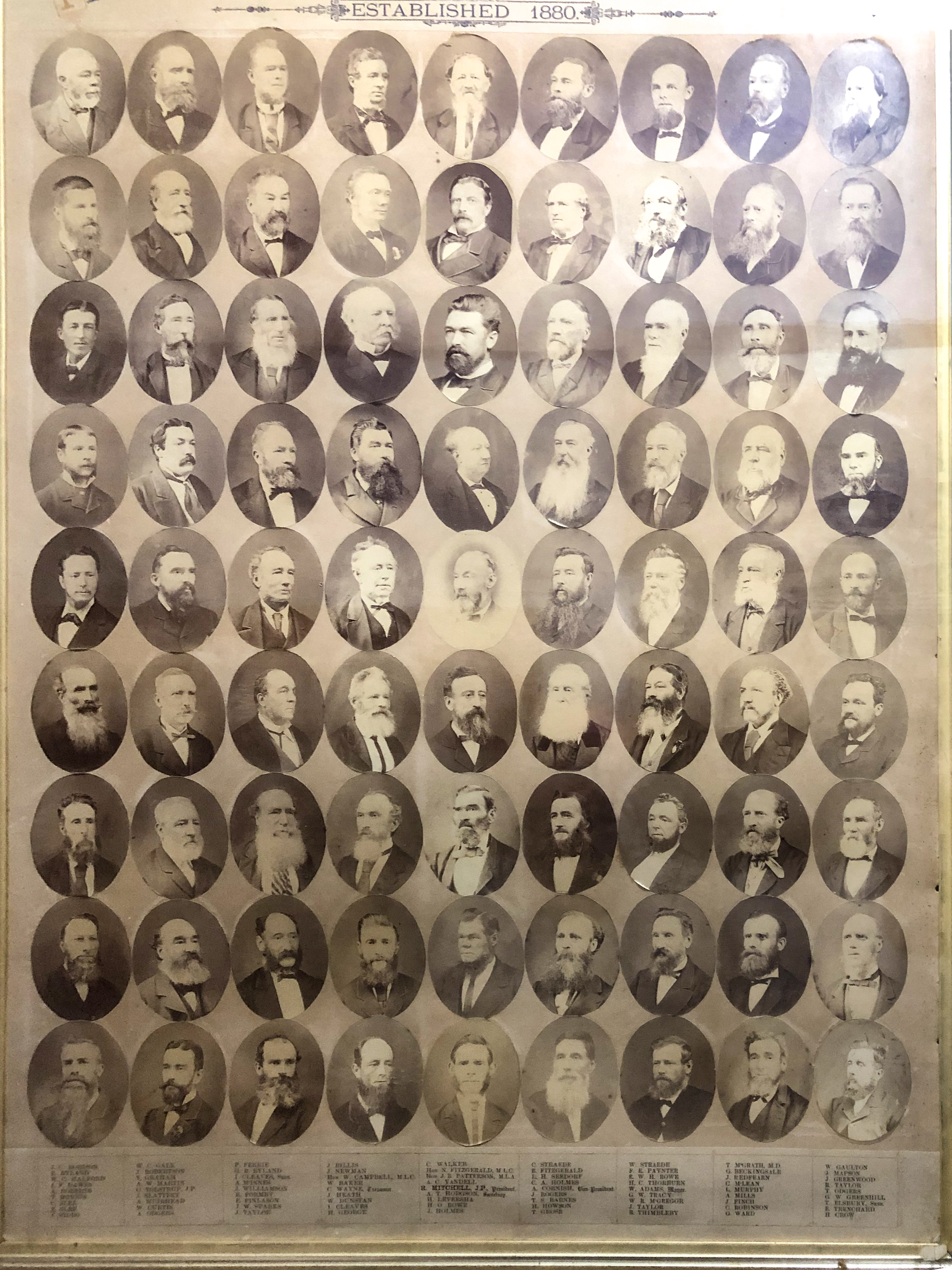
Frederick Coldrey (1881) Castlemaine Pioneers and Old Residents Association members

In 1882 Coldrey was awarded a prize for a case photograph at the town's agricultural show and in 1881 had produced a framed composite of eighty-one portrait cameos of members of the Castlemaine Pioneers and Old Residents Association, which is archived in its offices in the heritage Telegraph Office. He also made one for the Maldon branch in 1883.

In the last decade of his career, portraiture was being offered more cheaply in the form of tintypes. At Castlemaine Market an itinerant franchisee of the American Gem company offered their tiny prints on metal. At 20mm to 25mm wide and 30mm high, like the carte de visite they were exposed in a multi-lens camera but directly on a single metal photographic plate that was then cut. Special albums for the miniature portraits were also being marketed. It had become the most prolific form of photograph in 1860s America. Their local manifestation presented competition for Coldrey and he raised futile objection at a borough council meeting, but capitulated and advertised in Melbourne for one of the Gem cameras for his own studio. A successor to Coldrey as photographer in Castlemaine was Adolphus Verey, who took over Wherrett's studio in 1883.

== Personal life ==
The family lived in rented accommodation in Bull and then Bowden streets Castlemaine where in 1869 the second last of their six living children, Albert George was born. Coldrey Street, on the corner of which the family lived, is a short lane that runs between the northern stretches of Bowden and Farnsworth streets, and is named for him.

Coldrey's sons played cricket for Castlemaine and at least one was a member of the Amalgamated Society of Engineers, and when in 1886 son Henry was admitted to Castlemaine Hospital with typhoid fever, Coldrey tended to him there despite his own injury from an earlier fall at the railway station.

Coldrey died at Castlemaine Hospital on Sunday 19 May 1889, after taking ill on the Friday. Following his death, his wife Eleanor lived at 51 Farnsworth St Castlemaine with their only daughter, who was unmarried (also named Eleanor). The three are buried in lot 120 EE in Castlemaine Cemetery, Campbells Creek.

== Work in collections ==
- National Gallery of Victoria
- John Jenkins Collection
- State Library of Victoria

== Gallery ==
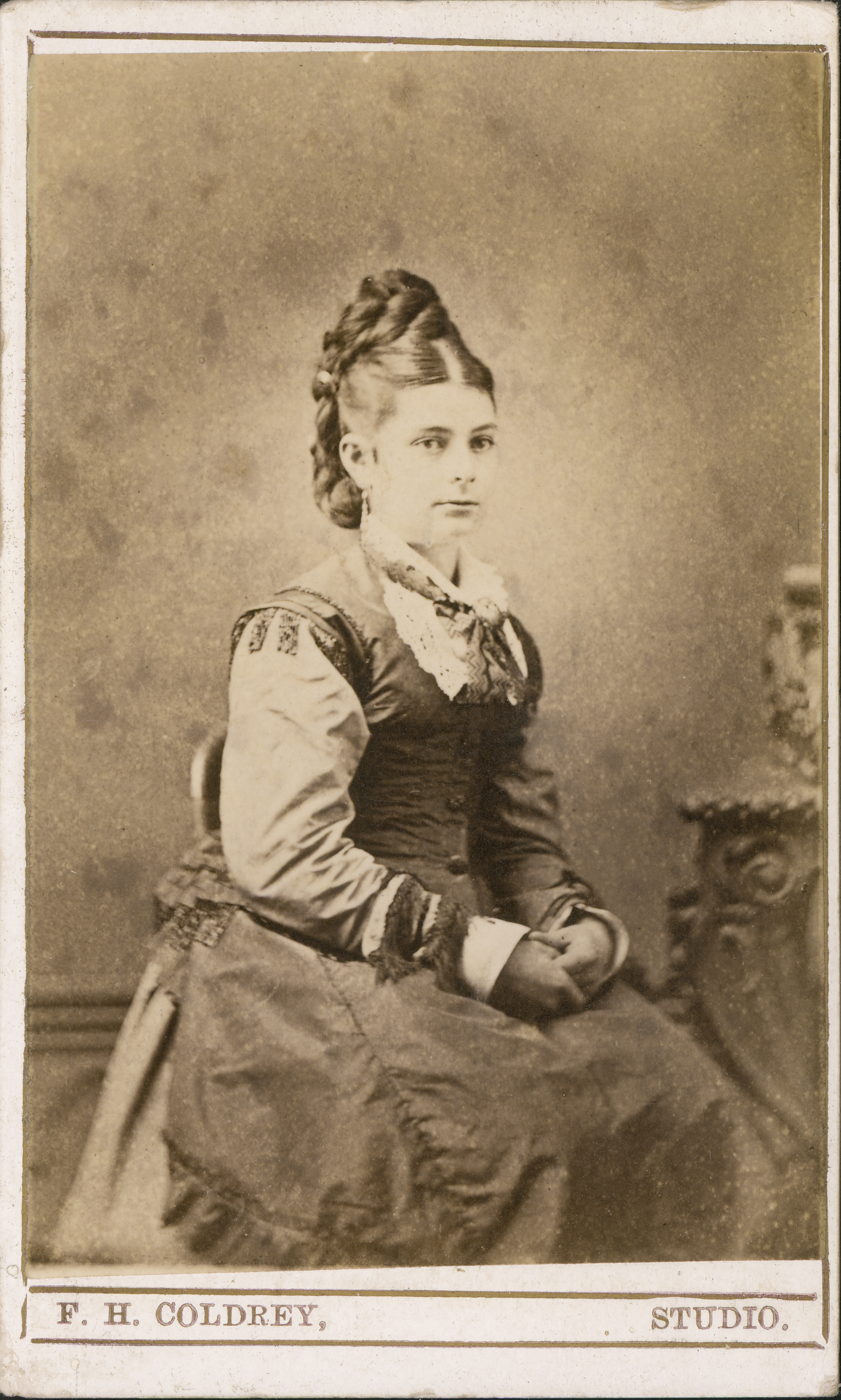
Frederick H. Coldrey (c. early 1870s) Carte de Visite portrait of a young woman.

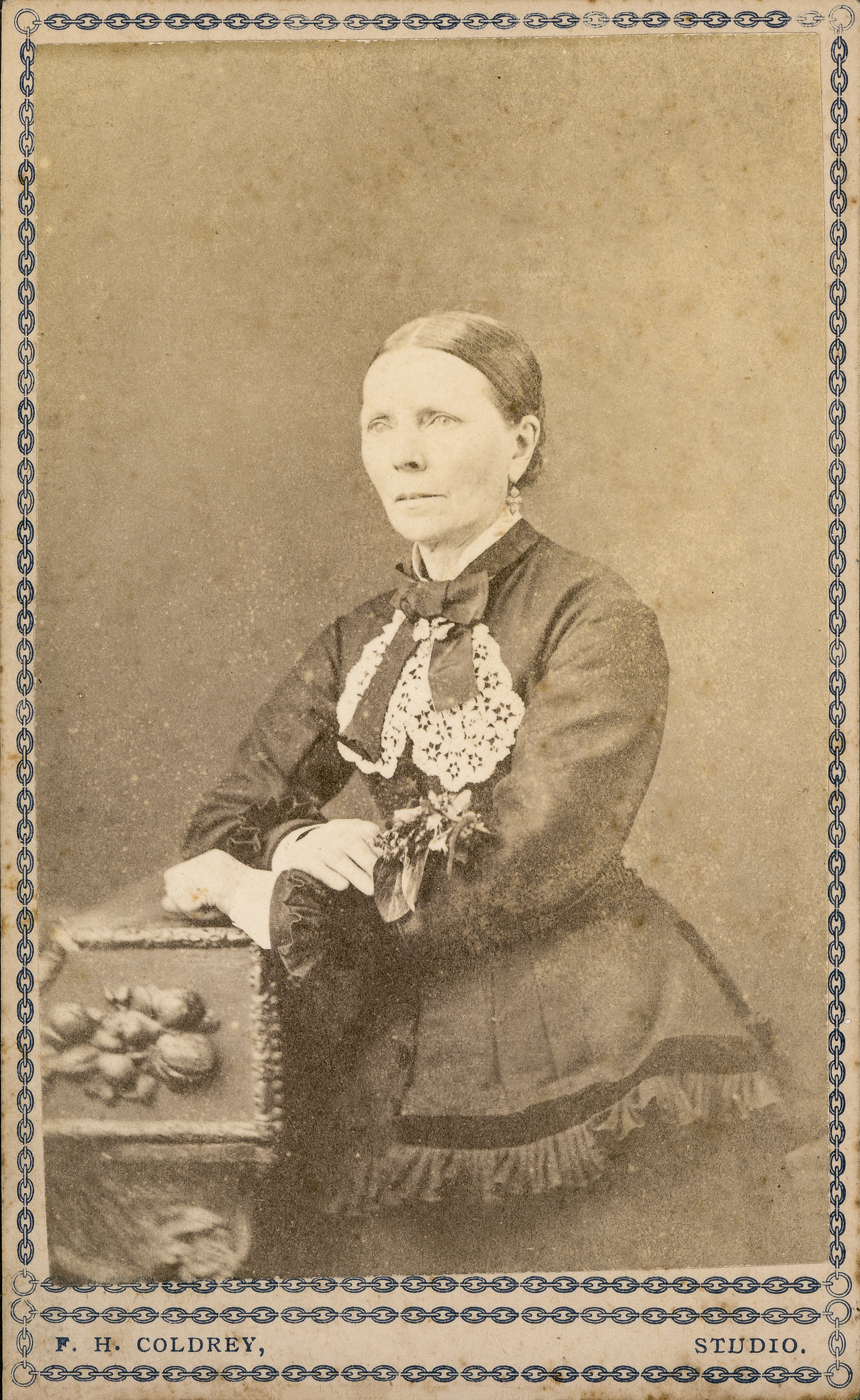
Frederick H. Coldrey (c. early 1870s) Carte de Visite portrait of a woman.

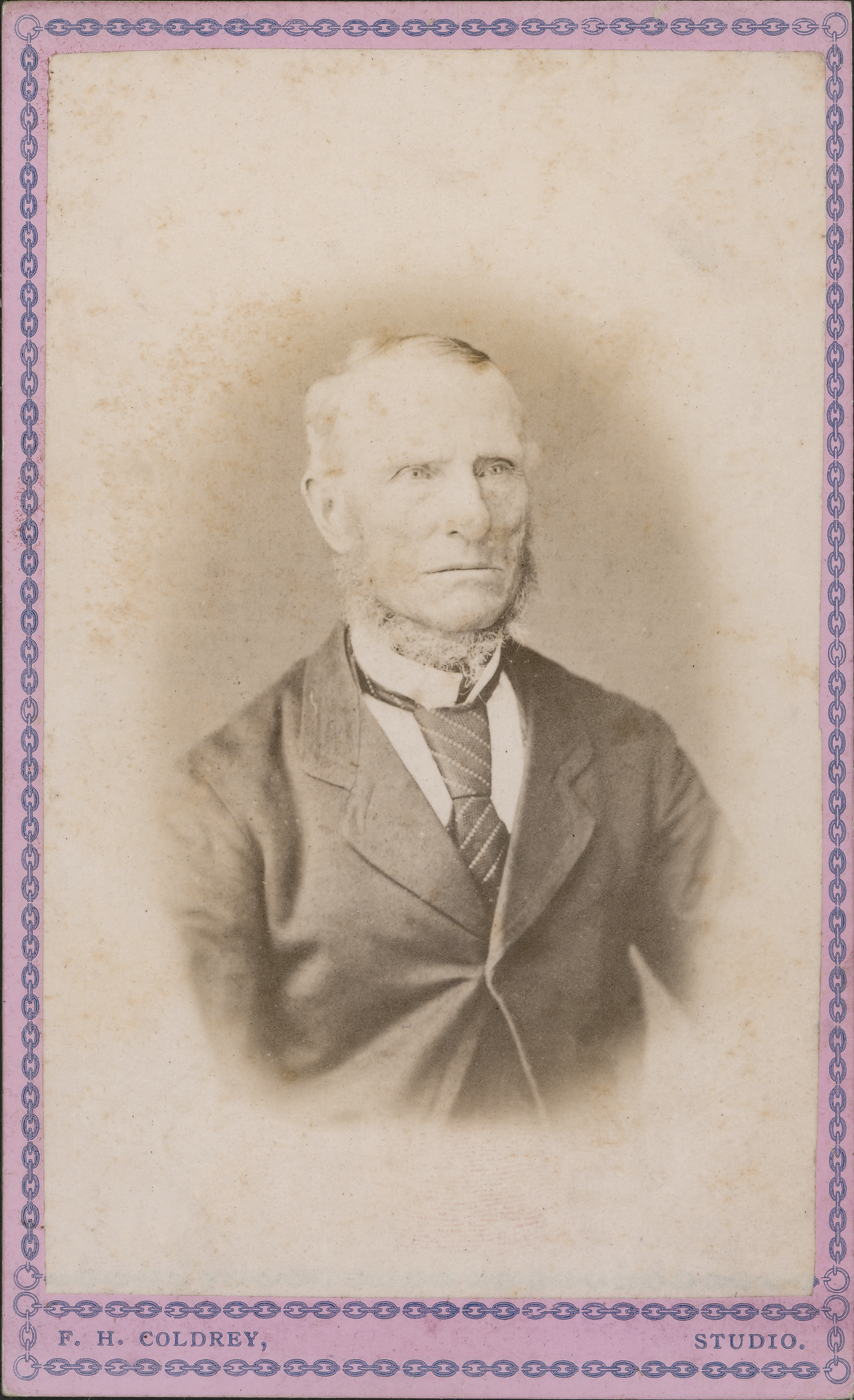
Frederick H. Coldrey (c. early 1870s) Carte de Visite portrait of a man.

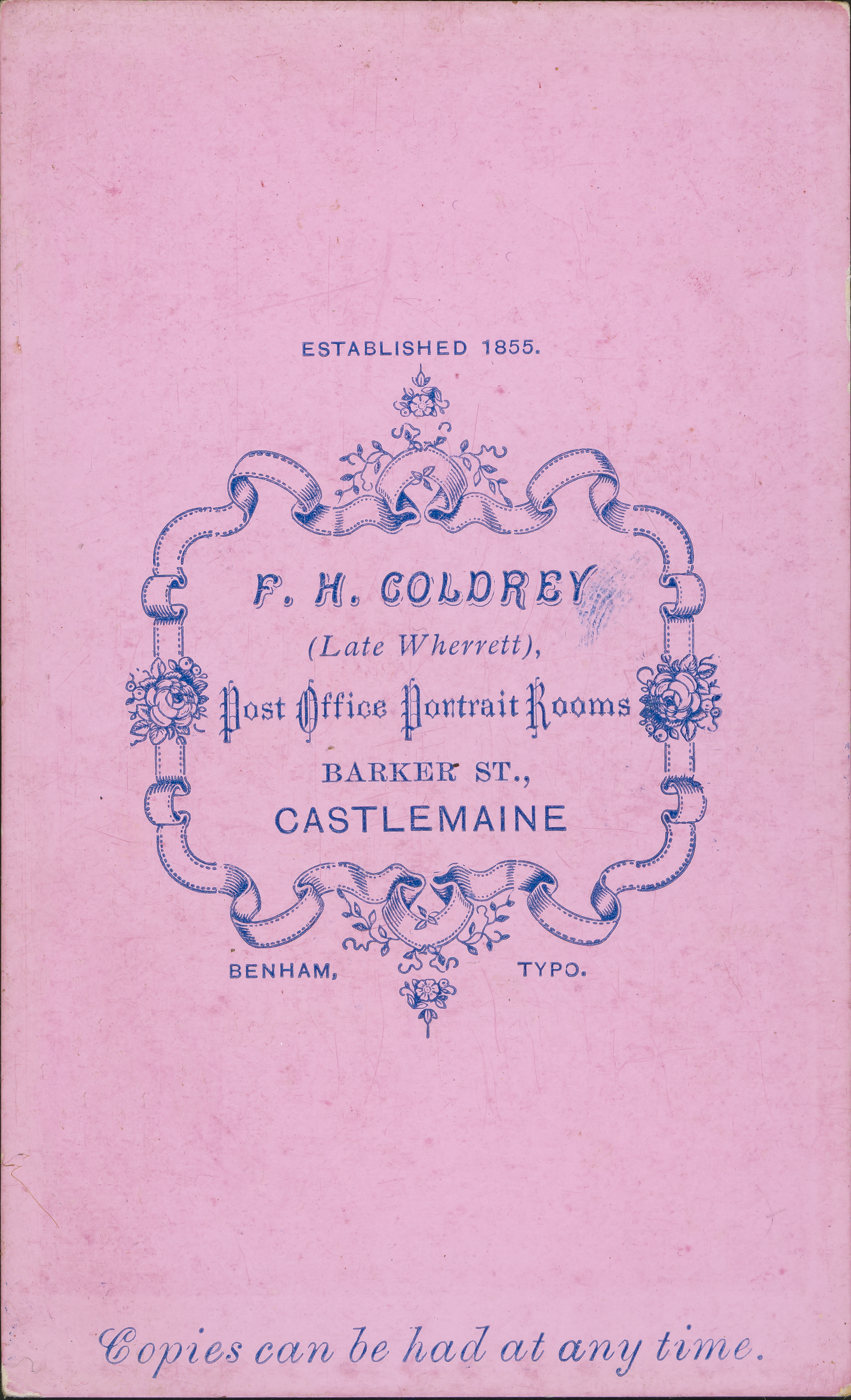
Frederick H. Coldrey (c. early 1870s) Carte de Visite portrait of a man (verso).
