= Adolphus Verey =

Australian commercial photographer (1862–1933)

- Born: 1862; Melbourne, Australia
- Died: 1933 (aged 70–71); Castlemaine, Victoria, Australia
- Occupation: Photographer

Adolphus Verey (1862, in Melbourne – 1933, in Castlemaine) was an Australian commercial photographer operating in North Central Victoria from the 1880s. An archive of 6,000 of his glass plates survives and his work of historical value is represented in national collections including the State Library of Victoria.

== Origin ==
Adolphus Verey was born in Melbourne in 1862, the fifth of seven children to English-born Harriet (née Lovelock) and Thomas Verey. The family moved to Daylesford between 1862 and 1864, where their last child was born and where Verey's parents and at least one of the sons remained. Family members were active in the church and in the local temperance movement.

== Photographer ==
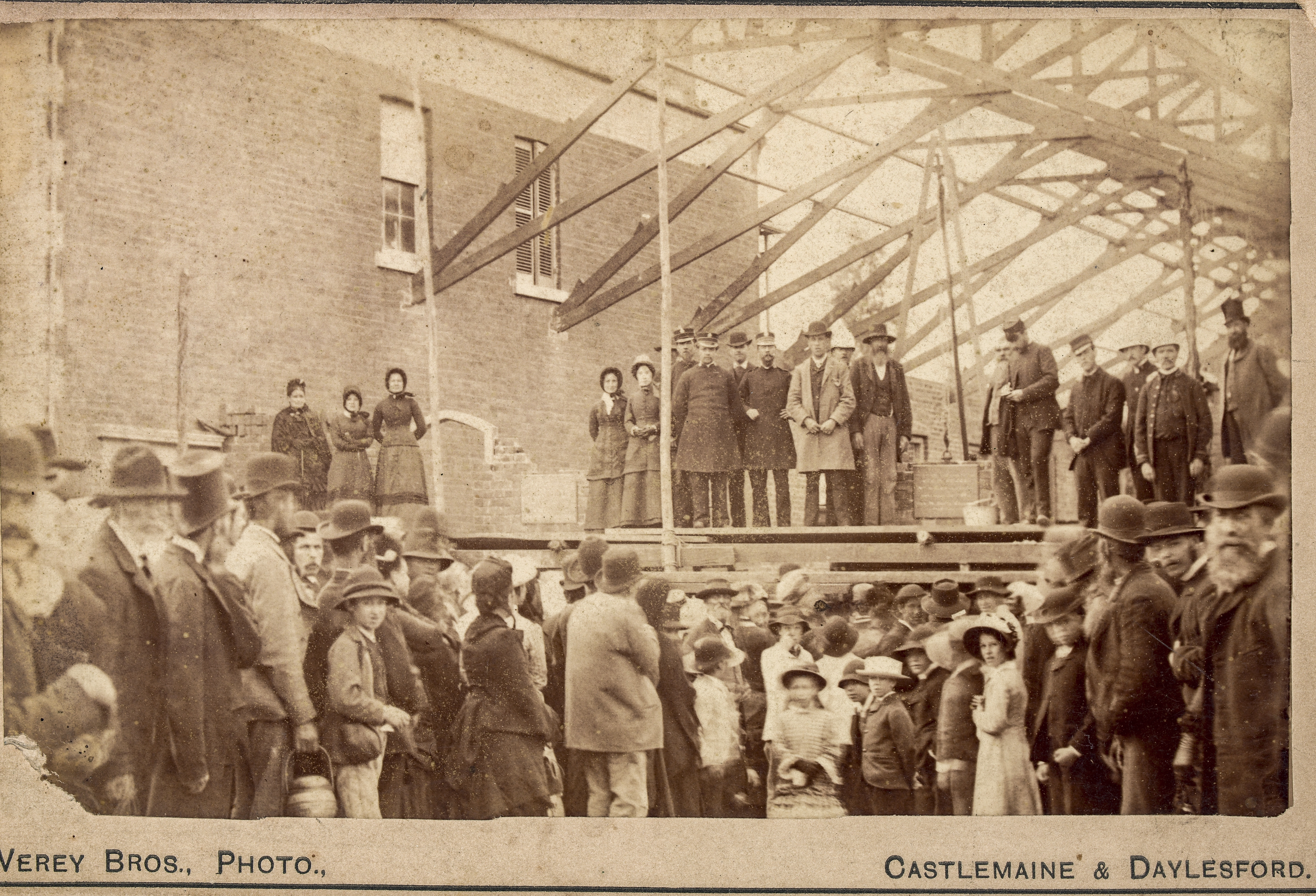
Verey Brothers (c.1885) Laying of the foundation stone at the Castlemaine Barracks, Victoria, ca.1885. State Library of Victoria

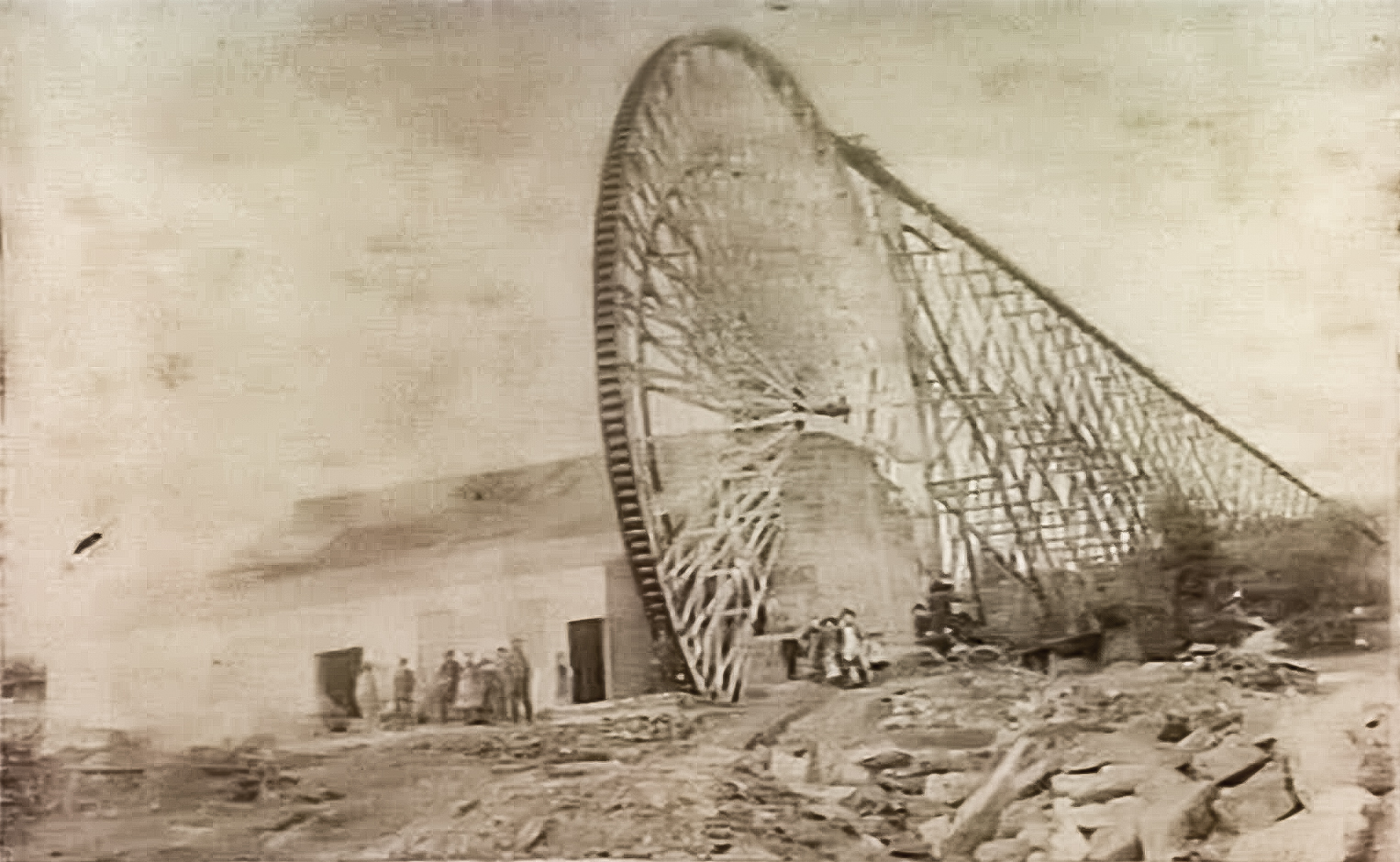
Verey & Co., photographer (c.1900) The Garfield Wheel 70 ft diameter near Castlemaine. State Library of Victoria

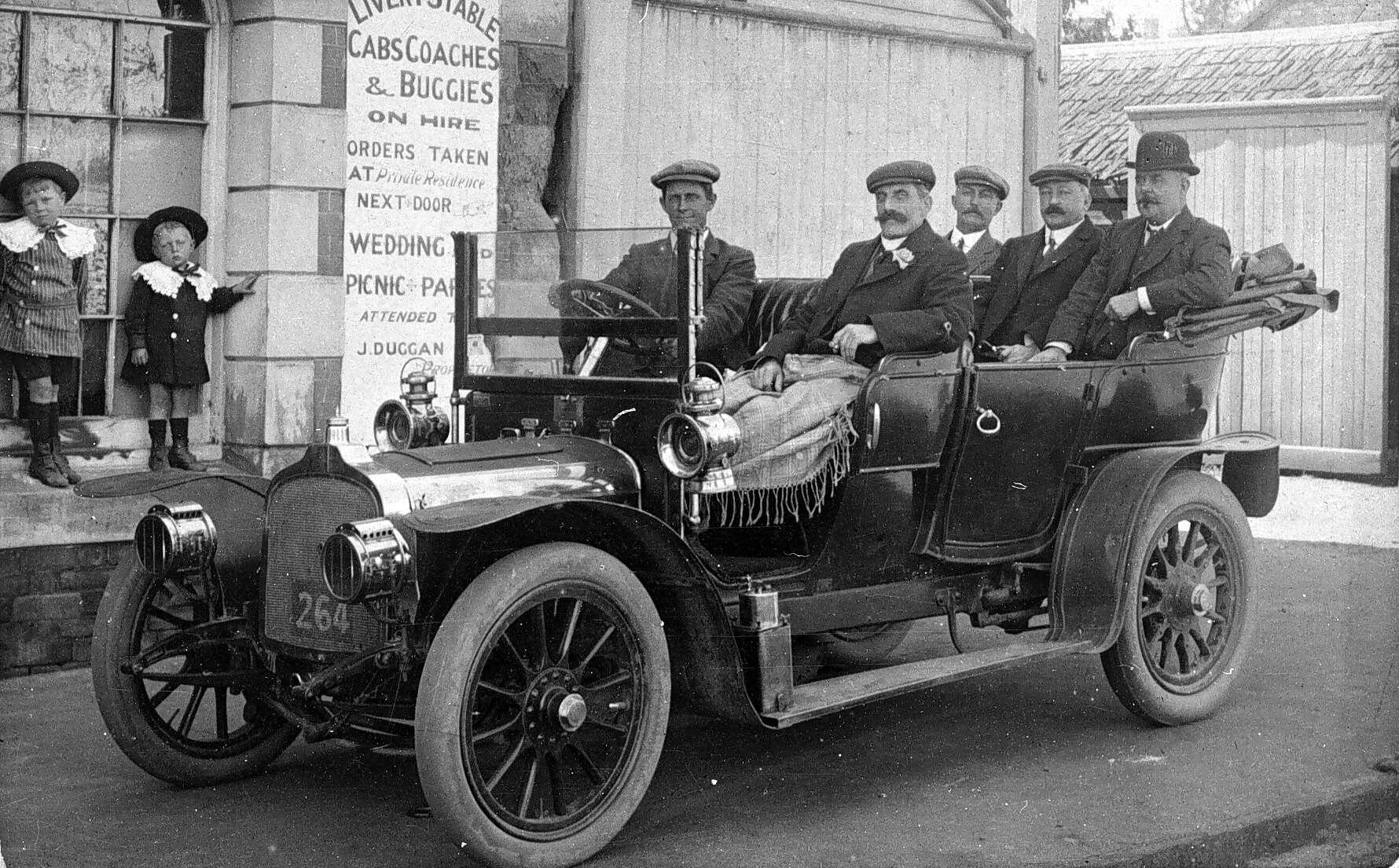
Adolphus Verey (c.1911) Gentlemen's Motoring Party in a Talbot outside Duggan's Livery Stables, Castlemaine, Victoria. State Library of Victoria

Verey was trained in photography by a Melbourne firm. He traveled Victoria as an itinerant photographer, then in 1883 operated from a studio with a suitable south light on the corner of Barker and Lyttleton Streets Castlemaine which still bears his name. He at first rented the premises from its absent landlord, another photographer Charles Wherrett who, after operating on the site in a covered wagon, had built it in the 1850s, then moved in 1863 to Sandhurst (Bendigo) in 1865, and to Hobart in 1871. A partner of Wherrett, Frederick Coldrey occupied the building until 1874, his career ending just as Verey arrived in the town.

Adolphus and Sophia Emma Clark, sister of George Clark a merchant whose name also appears on a Barker Street building, married in Castlemaine in 1886. Until 1990, Adolphus and his eldest brother, Frederick (1856–1921), traded as Verey Brothers out of Daylesford and Castlemaine before being renamed A. Verey and Co.

By the end of the century the Daylesford studio was closed as the main business of that part of the family was saw milling. After Wherrett's death, in October 1904 Verey purchased the building for £1405 (equivalent in 2021 to A$194,560.00), and between July and December 1907 rebuilt it in brick and rusticated rendering, as reported on its reopening, attended by M.L.A. Lawson, in the Mount Alexander Mail;

The studio is large and lofty, with a handsomely designed and colored steel ceiling, with every appointment for the comfort of visitors. There is a fine counter and in the centre of the room is a large picture stand, which is covered with pictures...On the walls are hung some beautiful pictures, showing off different designs in frames. The feature of the building is the front windows and it is doubtful if any photographer in the State has such a splendid window for displaying his work...There are eight large reflecting lights in the shop and window, aggregating over 1600 candle power. The window blinds are raised and lowered by a patent system and everything is thoroughly up to date. The lead lights of the windows have a very pretty effect when the place is lighted up. There is a finishing room at the rear of the shop...a very comfortable and well appointed dressing room, carpeted and decorated [and] a cosy waiting room, which opens into the large studio. On the other side of the passage are the enlarging room, workroom and printing room, fitted up with the very latest photographic appliances, some of them being very ingenious. Everything convected with the place suggests the liberal expenditure of money to ensure the best result.

The new upper floor of the building was fitted to be occupied by a dentist, and in 2023 continued to be. Verey's business was mostly weddings, commercial family and group portraits, occasional news photographs, and a growing assortment of views of the district used for postcards and souvenir booklets, as reported in 1884;

Mr Verey, photographer, has taken twenty views of the principal buildings and streets of Castlemaine, and of the Botanical Gardens. One of the latter, showing the gate at the entrance, with a view of the Benevolent Asylum crowning the hill in the background, is especially good. Mr Verey purposes extending his collection.

He was credited for such imagery as "photographer to the Cyclopaedia Company" in the 1904 edition of their Cyclopedia of Victoria, a number being displayed as advertisements for the town in railway carriages. In 1905 Verey & Co published Souvenir of Castlemaine and district : containing 26 photographic views, and in 1914 he was advertising "Australian scenery, hand coloured, framed and unframed pictures, suitable for presents, all prices." Among techniques Verey adopted was the opalotype, or milk-glass positive, which produced a delicate effect often described as like that of painting on ivory and which he employed for his 1885 'life-size' portrait of James Patterson, the year in which he was also thanked by the Governor of Victoria Henry Loch for a Morocco-bound album of photographic views of Castlemaine taken, as reported in the local paper;

...during the Governor's visit, and though there is much difficulty in getting groups of figures to come out clearly enough to be readily distinguishable, they succeeded well in photographing the Governor, Lady Loch, and party outside the gate of the Botanical Gardens.

Florence, the Verey's second youngest of their six children, worked as a retoucher and colourist until her marriage and relocation to Brighton in 1921, while his eldest son, Leslie who studied at the Grammar School and School of Mines, ceased his education at the end of Year 10 to join the business. He took most of the photographs in the 1920s and 1930s, running the business after Adolphus died in 1933, aged 70 years, and continued it as A. Verey and Co on the site until 1948, when he sold it to Ken C. Hammett, photographer. The building, occupied by a chemist in 1964 and since, continues to display in relief letters the Verey name on both facades.

== Portraits ==
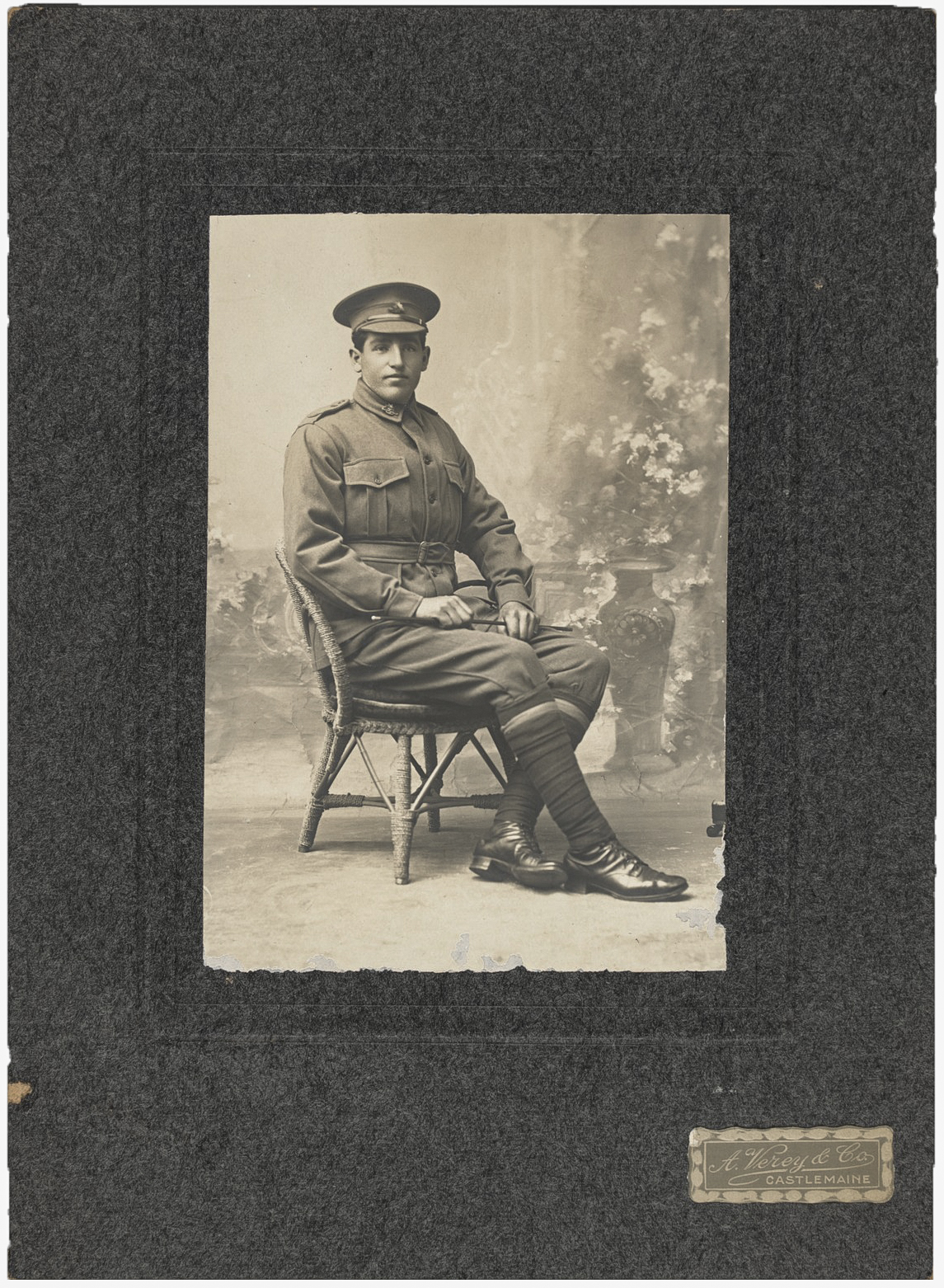
Verey Brothers (c.1914-1920) Unidentified Australian soldier. State Library of Victoria

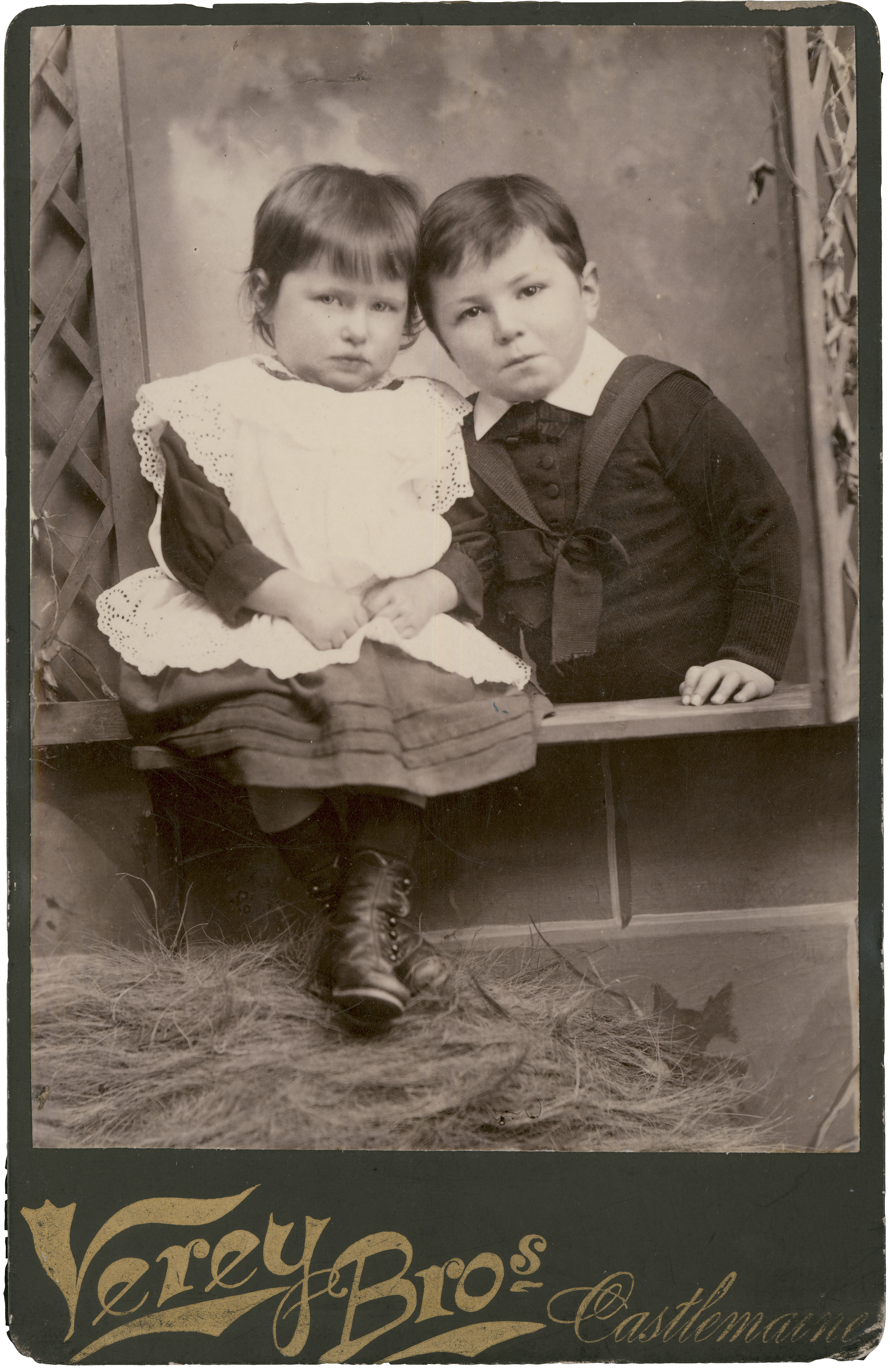
Verey Brothers (c.1900) Studio portrait of unidentified girl and boy, Castlemaine, Victoria. State Library of Victoria

From 1884 Verey & Co publicly displayed their portraits, and made group photographs of sports teams and schools picnics to attract customers . Quickly gaining a reputation, in 1885 Verey photographed J. B. Patterson, later to be Premier of Victoria (1893). Among portrait subjects photographed by the Verey firm were many Castlemaine residents who enlisted in WWI, two being the twins Wilkin, relatives of Verey's wife Sophie and Lieutenant-Colonel Field who was wounded at Gallipoli. In 1923 he portrayed the Victorian State Premier Harry Lawson, among his family at his Castlemaine home.

== Community service ==
A member of the Photographic Association of Victoria, Verey provided a luncheon at the Cumberland Hotel for its Melbourne contingent, and the Victorian Photographic Employers Association, on their visit to Bendigo in 1917.

Verey was active in his town's religious, educational and community organisations, starting, in 1885, as secretary of the Young People's Mutual Improvement Association. He was then involved with Progress Association; the Forward Castlemaine Association; the hospital; Technical School; the School of Mines as president; Mechanics Institute as treasurer from 1912, then vice-president 1914–1916; the Traders' Association as president; Victorian Country Industries, Traders and Producers' Association as Treasurer; judge of photography at the 1913 Autumn Horticultural Show; and supervisor of the Congregational Church Sunday School. He was Castlemaine delegate to the annual conference of Victorial School Boards in 1907.

During WWI he was active in raising funds for injured soldiers, in one instance donating for fund-raising 200 postcards of a group photograph of fifty Castlemaine volunteers. He long agitated for development of land laid waste by mining for agricultural education and housing. He joined a 'decentralisation League' which called for encouragement of local industries and the attraction of more business to rural Victoria. In 1909 he instituted the Verey Trophy for fire brigade competitions and in 1918 subscribed two guineas to its appeal for funds for a motor reel. He was a municipal councillor in 1906 and nominated again in 1918l, in support of which a poem was published in the Castlemaine Mail;

When Cr. Verey runs the council we will be right up-to-date,
We will have a model borough, and we'll have to pay no rate,
The finances of the borough will be on the Verey plan,
He'll re-organise the council, will this enterprising man,
If the firemen need a motor reel, and want the cash to raise,
They won't send out subscription lists in those millennium days.
They will go to Cr. Verey, and their needs to him they'll tell,
And he'll present them with a cheque, and their photographs as well.
On great financial problems will worry us no more,
When Cr. Verey runs the show our troubles will be o'er.
So, I'm longing, yes. I'm longing, and I'm waiting for the day
When Cr. Verey shows us how to make the Borough pay.

== The archive ==
The glass plate negatives were rediscovered by Ashley Tracey in the 1980s, some having been used for greenhouses and recognised from the faint image some still carried, and others were purchased by Tracey at auction in the 1980s. Subsequent gifts and acquisitions at auctions augmented the collection which now number about six thousand, with 4,600 in good condition.

In 2003, for $11,500, the entire archive was purchased, and made available for public use, through contributions from Castlemaine and Newstead Historical Societies, Chewton Domain Society, Goldfields Library Corporation, FOCAL (Friends of Castlemaine Library), supported by the Castlemaine Art Museum, and private donors.

Castlemaine Historical Society has 8700 Verey photographs in its collection scanned in TIFF format and available to the public. These images have studio notes scribbled on them identifying the customer, but not those photographed. Visitors have helped identify many of the people and locations in the photos.

Local historian Dr Heather Holst considered the collection a 'fantastic resource for Castlemaine.’ Reeves considers the value of the Verey collection in recording "the enduring, albeit subtle, Chinese presence on the Mount Alexander diggings that continued long after the heyday of the gold rushes of the 1850s and 1860s."
