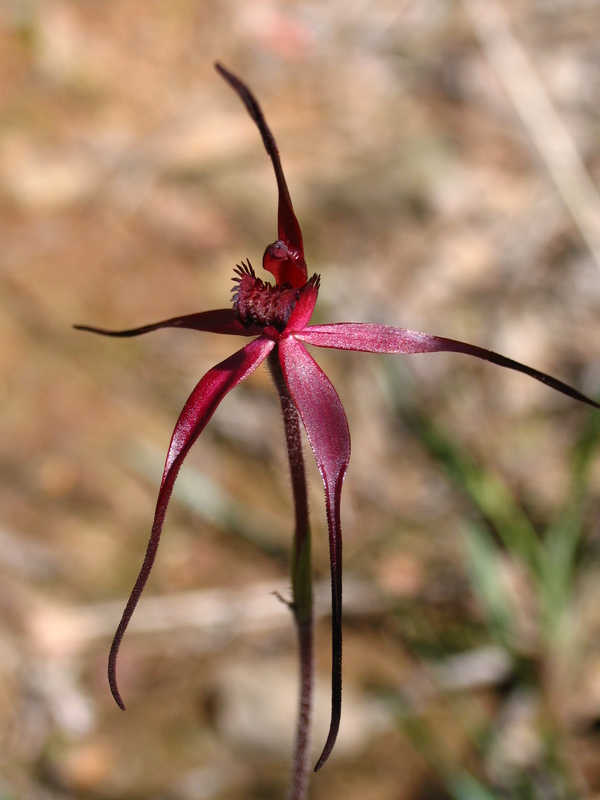

Scientific classification
- Kingdom: Plantae
- Clade: Embryophytes
- Clade: Tracheophytes
- Clade: Angiosperms
- Clade: Monocots
- Order: Asparagales
- Family: Orchidaceae
- Subfamily: Orchidoideae
- Tribe: Diurideae
- Genus: Caladenia
- Species: C. clavescens

Binomial name
- Caladenia clavescens (D.L.Jones) G.N.Backh.

Synonyms
- Arachnorchis clavescens D.L.Jones

= Caladenia clavescens =

Species of orchid

Caladenia clavescens is a plant in the orchid family, Orchidaceae and is endemic to central Victoria in Australia. It is a ground orchid with a single hairy leaf and usually a single dark red to maroon flower.

== Description ==
Caladenia clavescens is a terrestrial, perennial, deciduous, herb with an underground tuber and a single leaf, 8–14 cm (3–6 in) long and 6–12 mm (0.2–0.5 in) wide. One, rarely two flowers are borne on a spike 20–35 cm (8–10 in) high. The flowers are dark red to maroon, sometimes cream-coloured or pinkish with petals and sepals 3.5–6.5 cm (1–3 in) long. The sepals are 3–4 mm (0.1–0.2 in) wide, flattened near their bases but taper to a thread-like tip which is densely covered with glands. The petals are similar to the sepals but somewhat shorter. The labellum curves forward with the tip rolled under, and is broad lance-shaped to egg-shaped, dark purplish, 14–18 mm (0.6–0.7 in) long and 8–11 mm (0.3–0.4 in) wide. The sides of the labellum are fringed with linear teeth up to nearly 2 mm (0.08 in) long, decreasing in length toward the tip of the labellum. There are four to six rows of foot-shaped calli along the centre of the labellum; these are also about 2 mm (0.08 in) long near the base of the labellum and decrease in length towards its tip. Flowering occurs from September to October.

== Taxonomy and naming ==
This orchid was first formally described by David L. Jones in 2006 as Arachnorchis clavescens and the description was published in Australian Orchid Research. The type specimen was collected near Castlemaine. In 2007, Gary Backhouse changed the name to Caladenia clavescens. The specific epithet (clavescens) is derived from the Latin word clava meaning 'club' and the suffix -escens meaning 'becoming', referring to the more or less club-like tips of the sepals and petals of many of the specimens of this species.

== Distribution and habitat ==
Caladenia clavescens occurs in central Victoria near the towns of Campbells Creek, Castlemaine, and Chewton.

== Conservation ==
This spider orchid is listed as "vulnerable" and is protected under the Flora and Fauna Guarantee Act 1988.
