= Campbells Creek Park =

Park in Campbells Creek, Victoria, Australia

Campbells Creek Park is located on Main Road, Campbells Creek, Victoria.

In 2009, the Mount Alexander Shire Council decommissioned the local swimming pool due to the poor quality of the shell and pipe work, and high operating costs. The council was committed to redeveloping the site in two stages.

Stage 1 involved installing irrigation and drainage, a central path from the front entrance through the park to the Campbells Creek Trail and Reserve at the rear, development of a village square/boccie courts, grassed amphitheatre, arborist works and soft landscaping. Stage 1 was completed in 2011 and cost $137,698. Detailed consultation has been attempted to ensure that the community will be happy with future developments in Stage 2.

Regional Development Victoria allocated Campbells Creek Recreation Park Stage 2 $142,500 (2012–2013) and council allocated $235,300 to install new play facilities, historical signage and local art works (this seems still to be completed), and to construct public toilets, a picnic shelter with barbeque facilities and a shade sail off the existing amphitheatre.

The park is used for functions such as the Friends of Campbells Creek Community Day.
