= Campbells Creek Recreation Reserve =

Coordinates: 37.100088°S 144.206032°E

Set at the back of Campbells Creek, the trees here were originally selected by Baron Von Mueller, the famed botanist who designed the Castlemaine Botanical Gardens. The 37-40 Campbells Creek Fryer Road Reserve is the sport and recreation hub for the local community, and features:

- Cricket nets
- Football goal posts
- Male change-rooms
- Netball court
- Oval
- Oval lights
- Pavilion
- Playground
- Synthetic cricket wicket
- Trotting track

The Mount Alexander Shire Council is responsible for the management of the land, via the Campbells Creek Recreation Reserve Committee of Management (a Section 86 Committee). This group of local volunteers works to manage and maintain the reserve. The Committee of Management members are all actively involved with the various sporting groups that use the club-rooms, ground and trotting track and are always striving to bring out the best in their facility.

The Recreation Reserve hosts a range of events each year, including the KR Don Christmas party, Castlemaine Lawn Mower Racing and local school athletic days.

The following clubs have their home ground here:

- Campbells Creek Colts Cricket Club
- Campbells Creek Football Netball Club
- Campbells Creek Junior Football Club
- Campbells Creek Trotting Club.
