= Fanny Finch =

English immigrant to Australia

- Born: Frances Combe; 9 April 1815; London, England
- Died: 15 October 1863 (aged 48); Castlemaine, Victoria, Australia
- Occupation: Businesswoman
- Spouse: Joseph Finch (m. 1838)

Fanny Finch (born Frances Combe; 9 April 1815 – 15 October 1863) was an English immigrant to Australia who became a prominent businesswoman in the town of Castlemaine during the Victorian gold rush. She was born in London to black parents and was raised in a foundling hospital. She arrived in the colony of South Australia in 1837, marrying the following year before moving to the colony of Victoria in the early 1850s. She soon became a successful restaurateur in Castlemaine. In 1856, 52 years before women's suffrage was achieved in Victoria, Finch and another unnamed woman used their status as ratepayers to cast votes during municipal elections. She has been cited as one of Australia's first female voters and one of the earliest whose identity is known. Their votes were later disallowed and the law was amended to explicitly exclude women from voting.

== Early life ==
Frances Combe (also spelt Coombe) was born in London in 1815 and spent her childhood at the St Pancras Foundling Home. It is thought that she did not know her parents, but believed them to have been of African descent. Her 1863 death notice named them as Captain Sir Francis Jackson and Cecilia Hotham, but there is no evidence for this claim. Recent research by historians has identified them instead as Lydia Holloway, an unmarried domestic servant, and John King, a footman.

In 1836 Fanny was granted free passage to the newly proclaimed colony of South Australia as a domestic servant. She sailed with her employers, William and Julia Wyatt, from Gravesend aboard the John Renwick and arrived in Adelaide on 10 February 1837. William Wyatt was the appointed Surgeon on the ship and wrote an account of the voyage which references Fanny. In Adelaide she continued working for Julia Wyatt, an author and artist and the wife of William Wyatt, who was appointed the third South Australian Protector of Aborigines.

== Marriage and children ==
Fanny married Joseph Finch on 8 December 1838 in Adelaide. They had five children, Frances (1839-1932), Mary (1841-1916), James John (1843-1895), John (1846-1859) and Lewis (1848-1848). In about 1850, a year before the Victorian gold rushes began, Fanny and her four children left Adelaide for Victoria. Some sources suggest that Joseph Finch travelled with the family to Victoria, while others say that Fanny and the children went without him. Some sources suggest that the marriage ended with Fanny's move to Victoria; others say that she and Joseph Finch had at least two more children together. However, Joseph could not have been the father of Fanny's children Jane (1855-1855) and Louisa (1858-1859), which she claimed he was on their birth registrations, as he was in prison in Melbourne at the time. Her death notice mentions 16 children, 3 of them still alive at the time of her death, but the notice is known to contain other inaccuracies.

== Business ==
By 1852 the gold rush had begun and Fanny was running a restaurant and lodging house at Forest Creek, a gold rush settlement near Castlemaine. She later moved to Castlemaine and by 1854 was running a well-known restaurant. In 1855 she was prosecuted for selling spirits without a licence. The trial was covered in the goldfields press and prompted accusations that the police involved had behaved unfairly. In an anonymous letter to the Mount Alexander Mail, one supporter wrote that Finch's "restaurant at Forest Creek ... was the only one in which any person could get respectable accommodation." Finch was fined for the unlicensed liquor sale and in 1856 her restaurant was raided by police. She defended herself and demanded an apology in a letter published in the Mount Alexander Mail, an unusual step for a working-class woman in the male-dominated goldfields at the time.

== Voting ==
In 1856, during elections at Castlemaine, Finch and another unknown woman completed and signed voting cards in the city hall. At the time the law, passed in 1854, gave all "rate-paying persons" the right to vote, but the Australian women's suffrage movement was in its infancy and the wording appears to have been an oversight rather than a deliberate extension of the vote to women. The afternoon of the vote, election officiators disallowed both women's votes, on the grounds that "they had no right to vote". A report in the Melbourne Argus described Fanny Finch as "the famous Mrs Finch" and her participation as "an incident of the day".

In 1865, the Municipal Institutions Act (1854) was amended to explicitly exclude women from the vote in Victorian local elections, by changing "rate-paying persons" to "rate-paying men".

== Death and legacy ==
Finch died of inflammation of the lungs on 15 October 1863 at Castlemaine, aged 48.

Her voting card from 1856 is on display at the Castlemaine Art Museum. In 2020 a memorial to Finch was erected in the Castlemaine General Cemetery.

== See also ==
- Women's suffrage in Australia
- Australian gold rushes
- Women in Australia
- African Australians
