= Castlemaine Cemetery =

Cemetery in Victoria, Australia

- Interactive map of Castlemaine Cemetery

Details
- Established: 1853
- Location: Campbells Creek, Victoria
- Country: Australia
- Coordinates: 37.0929°S 144.2002°E
- No. of interments: 20,500
- Website: Official website
- Find a Grave: Castlemaine Cemetery

Campbells Creek is home to the historical Castlemaine Cemetery, which was moved from Templeton Street, Castlemaine, to Cemetery Road, Campbells Creek, in 1853. Most of the burials in the original cemetery were re-interred and the new cemetery was still called Castlemaine Cemetery.

The first burial noted in the new cemetery register was on 3 March 1853. Since then, there have been approximately 20,500 burials registered. The cemetery features a soldiers' memorial and an historic two-tiered Chinese funeral burner, which served as a safe place for the ritualized burning of spiritual tributes.

The Sexton's office was built in 1867 and was known then as "The Lodge". It houses the original 1875 cemetery map.

The cemetery trust has been managed by a group of volunteers appointed by the Government since 1859, an arrangement that continues to this day.

The cemetery is on the Victorian Heritage Register as the site is of historical, social, architectural, and aesthetic significance to Victoria.

Many of the pioneers of Castlemaine are buried in the cemetery including Fanny Finch, the first woman to vote in an Australian election, 50 years before it was legal for women to vote. It is also worth noting that Sir Harry Sutherland Wightman Lawson (1875–1952), 27th Premier of Victoria, is buried here.
