= Campbells Creek Trail and Reserve =

Track in Victoria, Australia

This walking and cycling track runs along Campbells Creek in the town of the same name, Victoria Australia.

The track initially runs besides Barkers Creek until the junction with Forest Creek and thereafter the combined flow is known as Campbells Creek. The trail starts at Forest Street Castlemaine, near the corner of Camp Reserve and finishes at the Campbells Creek Park, opposite the primary school.

Other entrances alone the route include:

- Gaulton Street, Castlemaine
- Camp Crescent, Castlemaine
- Midland Highway, Castlemaine
- Farnsworth Street, Castlemaine
- Butterworth Street, Castlemaine
- Ray Street, Castlemaine
- The south side of the Pyrenees Hwy (Elizabeth Street) underpass
- Lewis Drive, Castlemaine
- Princess Street, Campbells Creek
- Honeycomb Road, Campbells Creek

The track can be done without crossing a road following works completed in 2025. There are several bridges on the route where the track passes over the creek. The Castlemaine - Maldon railway line passes over both the trail and Campbells Creek via a timber trestle bridge south of the Pyrenees Highway (Elizabeth Street). The Castlemaine to Maldon Trail (which runs alongside most of the Victorian Goldfields Railway line and was completed during 2017) connects with the Campbells Creek Trail adjacent to the Pyrenees Highway (Elizabeth Street).

The track crosses flood plains covered with native vegetation and it is remarkable, at some points, how remote an observer can feel from the surrounding urban environment. Along its length are interactive notice boards, and scenic seats to take in the billabongs and flood plains which are covered in Australian plants and bird-life.

The trail is cared for by the Mt Alexander Shire Council and volunteers from the Friends of Campbells Creek Landcare group.
