= Lawson Insley =

Lawson Insley was a daguerreotyptist who operated in Australia and New Zealand during the 19th century. He worked in portraiture and captured the earliest known portrait of Māori subjects.

Insley arrived in Sydney in 1850. He set up a daguerreotype studio on George Street in September that year. Throughout the 1850s, Insley travelled between Australia and New Zealand, setting up studios and offering his services in portraiture.

His most significant portrait was that of Caroline and Sarah Barrett, the daughters of trader Dicky Barrett and his wife Wakaiwa Rawinia. It was taken in New Plymouth in 1853. He also took New Zealand's oldest surviving photograph, a portrait of Edward Catchpool in 1852.
