= Opalotype =

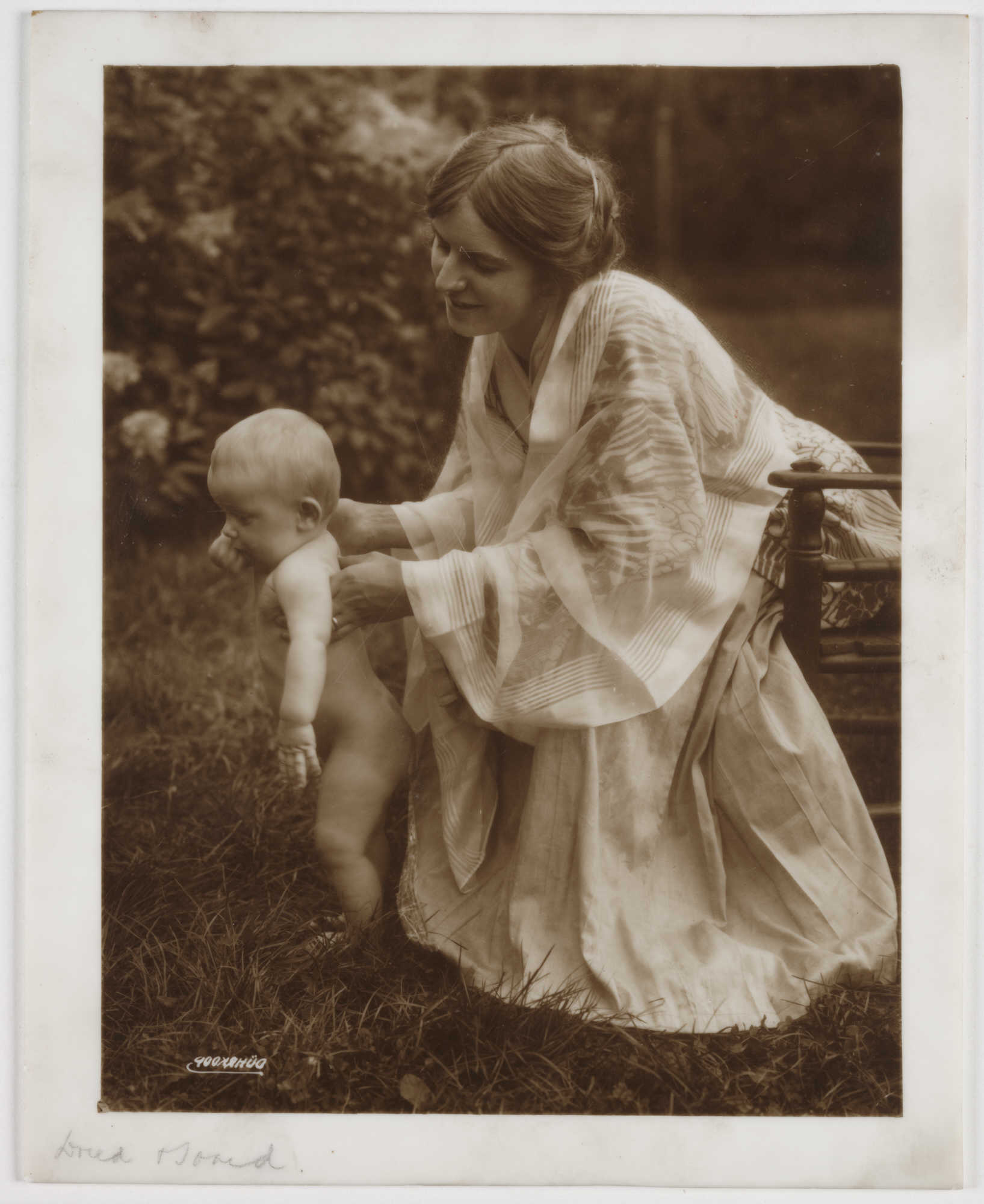
Opalotype example by German photographer Rudolf Dührkoop. National Media Museum.

Opalotype or opaltype is an early technique of photography.

Opalotypes were printed on sheets of opaque, translucent white glass; early opalotypes were sometimes hand-tinted with colors to enhance their effect. The effect of opalotype has been compared "to watercolor or even pastel in its softer coloring and tender mood." "Opalotype portraits...for beauty and delicacy of detail, are equal to ivory miniatures."

Opalotypes were first patented in 1857 by Glover and Bold of Liverpool. They were made either by transferring a print to opal glass or by printing directly onto a light-sensitive coating on the glass; later opalotypes used processes including collodion, carbon transfer, and silver gelatin. Opalotype photography, never common, was practiced in various forms until it waned and disappeared in the 1930s. "Milk glass positive" is another alternative term for an opalotype.

Opalotype is one of a number of early photographic techniques now generally consigned to historical status, including ambrotype, autochrome, cyanotype, daguerreotype, ivorytype, kallitype, orotone, and tintype. This and many other historical photographic methods are now considered alternative photographic techniques and are practiced by a small number of dedicated artists.
