= Campbells Creek, Victoria =

Campbells Creek Victoria
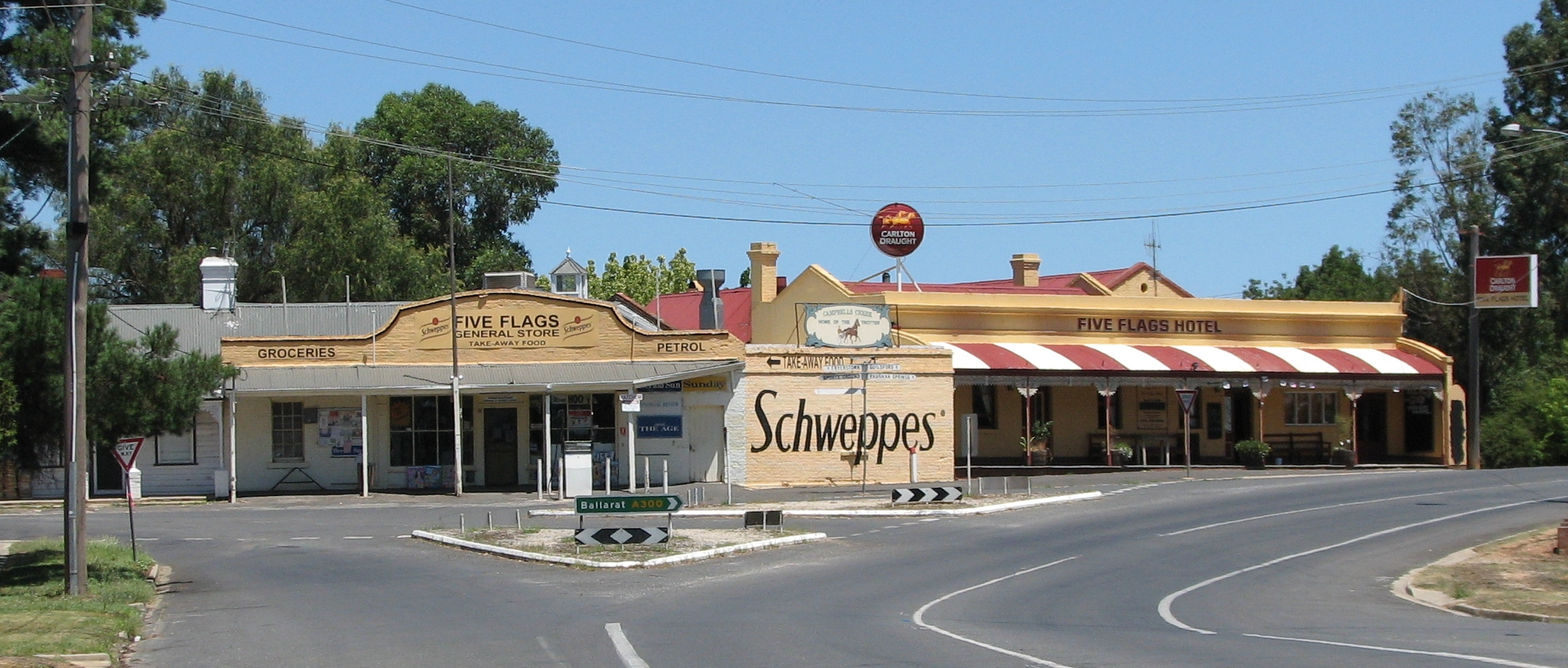
- General store and hotel

- Coordinates: 37°06′S 144°12′E
- Population: 2,071 (2021 census)
- Postcode(s): 3451
- Time zone: AEST (UTC+10)
  - Summer (DST): AEDT (UTC+11)
- Location: 120 km (75 mi) NW of Melbourne; 40 km (25 mi) S of Bendigo; 2 km (1 mi) S of Castlemaine
- LGA(s): Shire of Mount Alexander
- State electorate(s): Bendigo West
- Federal division(s): Bendigo
Localities around Campbells Creek:
Castlemaine	Castlemaine	Castlemaine
Muckleford	Campbells Creek	Fryerstown
Muckleford	Fryerstown	Fryerstown

Campbells Creek is a town in Mount Alexander Shire, Victoria, Australia. At the 2021 census, Campbells Creek had a population of 2,071.

== Location ==
Campbells Creek lies 120 km northwest of Melbourne and 40 km south of Bendigo. The town shares its name with a line of billabongs flowing south towards the nearby Loddon River. The town is on the southern outskirts of Castlemaine on the Midland Highway (Main Road). Campbells Creek depends on Castlemaine for many of its services.

The town was originally managed by the Shire of Newstead, which was amalgamated into the Mount Alexander Shire.

== Transport ==
Castlemaine Bus Lines travel several times on weekdays from Campbells Creek to the Castlemaine Railway Station where trains and buses depart to Melbourne, Bendigo, Ballarat, Mildura and Maryborough. Weekend services are reduced and some are not provided on Sundays. A long disused Castlemaine to Maryborough via Newstead railway line still runs through the town.

== Population ==
In the 2006 census, Campbells Creek had a population of 1,266. Then in the 2011 census, the population had grown by 184 to 1,510 (51.6% female, 48.4% male), with 0.62 residents per hectare. The median age was forty years with 14.0% born outside Australia. The most common other countries of birth were England (46), New Zealand (16), and United States of America (10). Compared to the rest of the Mt Alexander Shire, Campbells Creek had a smaller proportion of people born overseas and was home to a higher proportion of couple families with a child or children; 9.2 percent were one-parent families, compared with 10.4 percent for the Mount Alexander Shire. In 2011, there were 674 households in Campbells Creek. The most common religious affiliation was "No Religion" (40%), followed by Anglican (14%). At the 2016 census Campbells Creek had a population of 1,786. Of these people 46.3% were male and 53.7% female. The median age was 42 years.

== Economy ==
Campbells Creek supports a licensed post office, hotel, general store and cafe, a hardware store and numerous businesses, such as bed-and-breakfast accommodation, a beauty therapist, a bookshop, engineering and earthmoving businesses, mechanics and a transport firm. According to the 2011 Census, Campbells Creek has a low level of disadvantage, in fact the lowest in the Mount Alexander Shire: the median weekly household income was $1025 (compared with $838 for the Shire). Similarly, at 2.9 percent, unemployment in Campbells Creek was significantly lower than the statewide average of 5.4 percent. A higher proportion of residents of Campbells Creek held formal qualifications compared to the Shire and a lower proportion of the population were 60+ years of age.

== Sport ==
Campbells Creek have an Australian Rules Football team named the Campbells Creek Magpies. They have the record for the largest known score in Australian Rules Football history when they beat Primrose 100.34 (634) to 3.0 (18).

== History ==
The Dja Dja Wurrung or Jaara People are the traditional owners of the land upon which the town of Campbells Creek is situated. The Dja Dja Wurrung people have been living on the land for around 40,000 years. One of their local legends talks of seeing a mountain of fire which, according to Castlemaine geologist Dr Julian Hollis, refers to a volcanic eruption north east of Mt Franklin approximately 500 years ago. Early squatters moved into the area in the 1840s with their flocks of sheep, thus displacing the Indigenous people. There were many clashes between the two groups, some fatal. The local people resorted to spearing sheep for food as they were displaced from their own hunting lands, and this was used as an excuse to massacre groups of Aboriginal people.

In order to control the Aboriginal population in Victoria, the colonial government appointed a Chief Protector and four deputies to "watch over the rights and interests of Natives, to protect them from any encroachments on their property." One of these deputies, Edward Stone Parker, was responsible for a large area of eastern Victoria, including the Campbells Creek area, known as the Loddon Protectorate. While the role was nominally to protect Aboriginal people, particularly in remote areas, the role included social control up to the point of controlling whom individuals were able to marry and where they lived, managing their financial affairs, and removing children from families.

When the Protectorate closed in 1848, some Dja Dja Wurrung remained and could still be seen in the bush and in the towns. Their numbers were small and overtaken by new settlers, the pastoral Chinese, ahead of the gold rush of the early 1850s. There are still Aboriginal people living in the vicinity.

The town is named after a tributary of the Loddon River, namely Campbells Creek, which flows through the town. Dr Barker and William Campbell were early squatters in this area. Campbell had been employed by the Macarthur family on land near Sydney and then established the Strathloddon run, the boundaries of which encompassed the entire creek valley. Campbell became a leader and spokesman for squatters across Victoria and, in 1851, was elected to represent the Loddon electorate in the first Victorian Legislative Council.

Alex and Margaret Kennedy took over their relative William Campbell’s lease in the 1840s. Their child Jessie became the first non-Aboriginal child born in the Castlemaine area, at a site at the southern entrance to Campbells Creek that is now a rest stop for travelers exploring the heritage gold fields trail.

Campbells Creek was founded during the gold rush of the 1850s and the Post Office opened on 16 April 1858.

After gold was discovered in 1851, a canvas-tent shanty town emerged. By 1853 it was estimated that 3000 people, from all walks of life and countries, were living along Campbells Creek. There were numerous hotels, a brewery, houses of worship belonging to the Primitive Methodists and Presbyterians, and a denominational school. By 1858 the roads had improved, and stone and brick dwellings and stores appeared. There was a huge corrugated iron store, a wooden wheelwright’s shop, a drapery, a general store, the Phoenix Brewery, several hotels and some substantial brick dwellings.

In the second half of the 1850s a huge Chinese camp of more than 3000 people emerged along Campbells Creek and Guildford. Gathering together for safety, as hostility to the Chinese was overt and overwhelming, there were numerous local conflicts, some of considerable proportions. Calico tents were the main domiciles, lining narrow thoroughfares dotted with joss temples, tea-houses, tailors, apothecaries, gambling establishments, opium dens, herbalists and barbers. The Chinese tended to work not so much as individuals, but in a type of co-operative, using a system of open-cast alluvial mining. A fire swept away the Chinese camp at Campbells Creek on Australia Day 1875 destroying most of a little Canton but saving the Five Flags Hotel (which remains today).

This rapid growth into the late 1800s declined as gold supplies waned and mines closed. Bucket dredging was employed early in the 20th century to extract the last remnants of gold. After the Victorian Gold Rush era, orchards, vineyards, breweries and farms sustained the settlement.

The Campbells Creek Soldiers Memorial records locals in all the Australian Services who died in both World Wars, in theatres such as France (many at Villers-Bretonneux), Libya, Egypt, Thailand and the Pacific. Many served in infantry battalions during World War I.

The town has an Australian Rules football team competing in the Maryborough Castlemaine District Football League. The highest ever score in a senior game of Australian Rules football was scored by Campbells Creek, 100.34.634, defeating Primrose, 3.0.18, in a game in 1990.

== Historic Buildings ==
As you travel from Castlemaine through Campbells Creek, the Main Road is lined with many historical buildings.

At the foot of Norwood Hill, just before the Campbells Creek sign, are two small cottages with gables: on the right hand side is Vermont Villa (131), which dates from 1861, and, on the other side of the road, Jubilee Cottage (c. 1860).

A little further along, on the left, is a second-hand book-store, which had been the Standard Hotel, built in 1854 as the Bath Arms, and purchased by the Standard Brewery in 1869.

Just beyond, on the left, is the two-storey verandah façade of the Diggers’ Store constructed in 1857. In 1864 it was renamed the Vine Hotel, after its grape vines. It was rebuilt in 1876 after a fire and is now a rehearsal and recording studio. On the other side of the road, behind a hedged picket fence, is a gracious Federation house that originally belonged to the owner of the Campbells Creek Brewery which had stood behind the impressive home.

A little further along Main Road are two former churches: the first (Methodist) built in 1862 and now belonging to the Olivet Christian College; the second, ‘Church of the Holy Trinity’, has been used as an antique shop but is now a private residence. On the other side of the road is a wattle-and-daub building which was once a cordial factory.

On the same side of the road is the Independent Order of Rechabites Temperance Hall. Membership was open to all who would sign a pledge to completely abstain from alcohol. Members gained death and sickness benefits.

Continuing south, just past the Campbells Creek Park, is a small weatherboard ‘Shire of Mount Alexander Ex Shire of Newstead’ Hall. This was originally a toll collecting office that was moved from outside the Five Flags Hotel. This hall was later used as the town hall from 1860–1915 when the Mount Alexander Shire amalgamated with the Shire of Newstead.

Perhaps the most notable historical building in Campbells Creek is the Five Flags Hotel, which celebrated its opening ball on Friday 1 June 1855, or the Five Flags Merchants Cafe & General Store, originally opened circa 1853. The area surrounding them was known as Five Flags after the many nationalities that worked the gold fields hereabouts.

== Community Facilities ==
- Campbells Creek Cemetery Trust (Castlemaine Cemetery)
- Campbells Creek Community Centre
- Campbells Creek Park
- Campbells Creek Recreation Reserve
- Campbells Creek Trail and Reserve
- Castlemaine Diggings National Heritage Park

== Schools ==
- Campbells Creek Primary School
- Olivet College

== Community and Leisure Groups ==
- Campbells Creek Bowling Club
- Campbells Creek Colts Cricket Club
- Campbells Creek Community Garden Group
- Campbells Creek Fire Brigade
- Campbells Creek Football/Netball Club
- Campbells Creek Playgroup
- Campbells Creek Senior Citizens Club
- Campbells Creek Tennis Club
- Campbells Creek Trotting Club
- Friends of Campbells Creek Landcare Group
- Campbells Creek Matters
- History Group
- Liberty Christian Life Centre
