= Metcalfe, Victoria =

Metcalfe
- Town
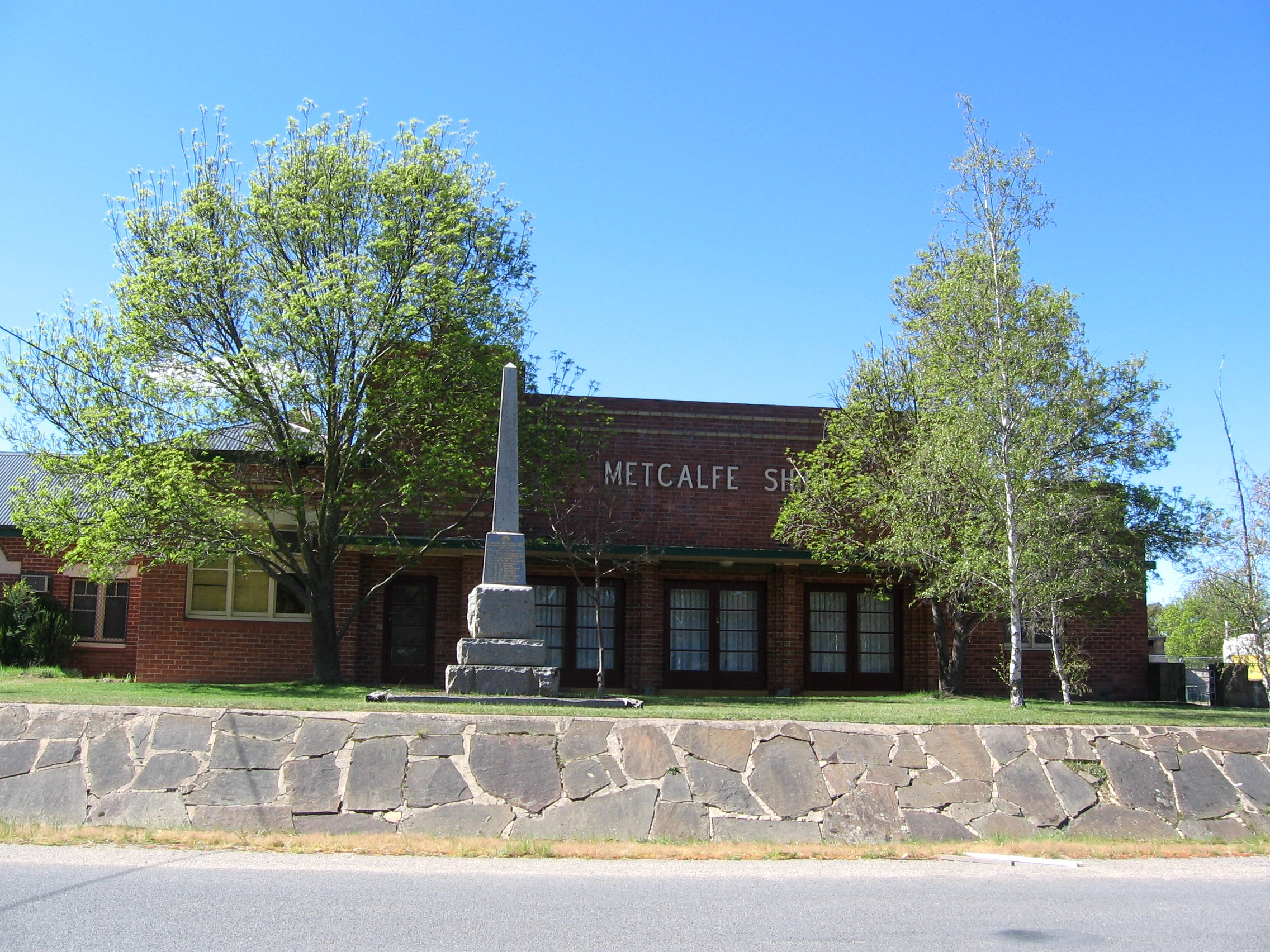
- Former Shire Hall and Council chambers at Metcalfe

- Interactive map of Metcalfe
- Coordinates: 37°06′S 144°25′E
- Country: Australia
- State: Victoria
- LGA: Shire of Mount Alexander
- Location: 101 km (63 mi) from Melbourne; 35 km (22 mi) from Bendigo; 18 km (11 mi) from Kyneton; 20 km (12 mi) from Castlemaine

Government
  - State electorate: Macedon
  - Federal division: Bendigo

Population
  - Total: 190 (2021 census)
- Postcode: 3448
Localities around Metcalfe
Myrtle Creek, Victoria	Redesdale	Redesdale
Elphinstone	Metcalfe	Barfold
Elphinstone	Metcalfe East	Metcalfe East

Metcalfe is a town in Mount Alexander Shire. Victoria, Australia. At the 2021 census, it had a population of 190.

The name of the town probably derives from Baron (Charles) Metcalfe, Governor-General of India and later of Canada, who died in 1846. Metcalfe lies on the Coliban River, downstream from the Malmsbury reservoir.

== History ==
Metcalfe was developed mainly during the central Victorian gold rush period, from 1851 to 1865. It is reported that, in 1851, when the first miners arrived on the Mount Alexander goldfield, near Castlemaine, gold nuggets could be picked up without digging. Nearby reserves still bear the scars of mining activity, including deep shafts and adits.

In 1861, the Metcalfe Road Board was established and, in 1865, the Shire of Metcalfe was declared and the shire hall was constructed. The former shire hall still contains records of councillors and mayors until the dissolution of the shire in 1995.

For most of its history, the major economic activity has been grazing. Recent (2015) purchases of large grazing properties have been made by Chinese interests.

At times, Metcalfe has had a school, post office, a pub and various other businesses, but all of them are now closed. However, Metcalfe does have a recreation reserve with a tennis court and playground. After the opening of the Calder Freeway the volume of traffic travelling between Kyneton and Bendigo via Metcalfe reduced significantly.

Metcalfe post office opened on 13 December 1866.

== Attractions ==
At the "Cascades", just west of the town, the Coliban River flows over and among huge granite boulders and outcrops, creating many rock pools of varying sizes. It is popular for walks, picnics and swimming.

The Metcalfe Tractor Pull is held in September each year.
