= Mount Alexander =

Mountain in Victoria, Australia

Mount Alexander (Lanjanuc)
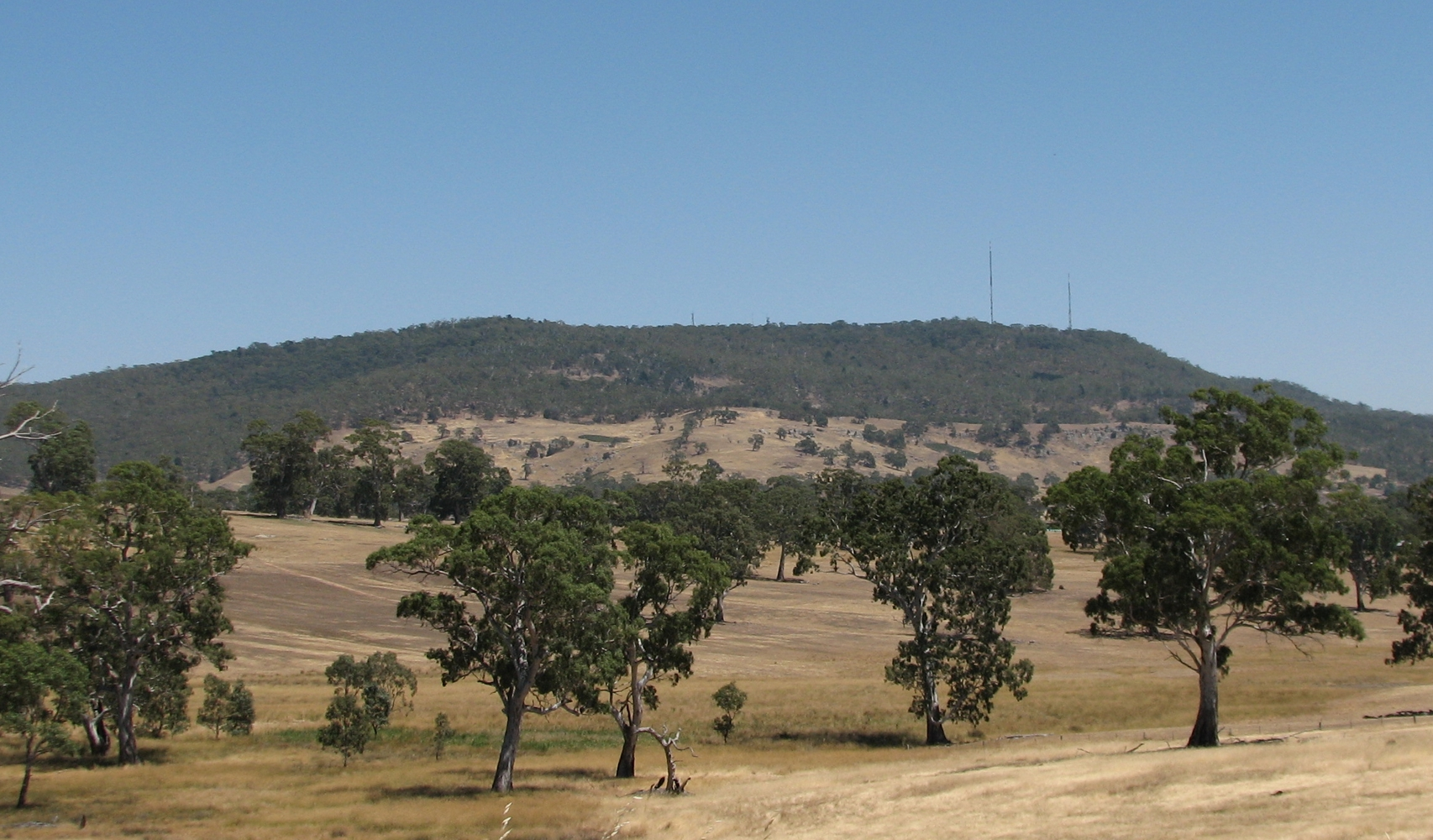
- View from near Harcourt

Highest point
- Elevation: 744 metres (2,441 ft) AHD
- Prominence: 350 m (1,150 ft)
- Coordinates: 36°59′49″S 144°18′18″E

Geography
- Location within Victoria
- Location: Victoria, Australia

Climbing
- First ascent: Thomas Mitchell (first European)

Mount Alexander is a mountain located approximately 125 km north-west of Melbourne, near the town of Harcourt. It rises 350 metres above the surrounding area to a level of 744 metres above sea level. Being a prominent local landmark, the mountain has its name associated with the surrounding district once known as the Mount Alexander goldfields, and presently incorporated in the Shire of Mount Alexander, centred on Castlemaine. Most of the mountain is included within the boundaries of the Mount Alexander Regional Park managed by Parks Victoria. The Djadjawurrung name for the mountain is Lanjanuc.

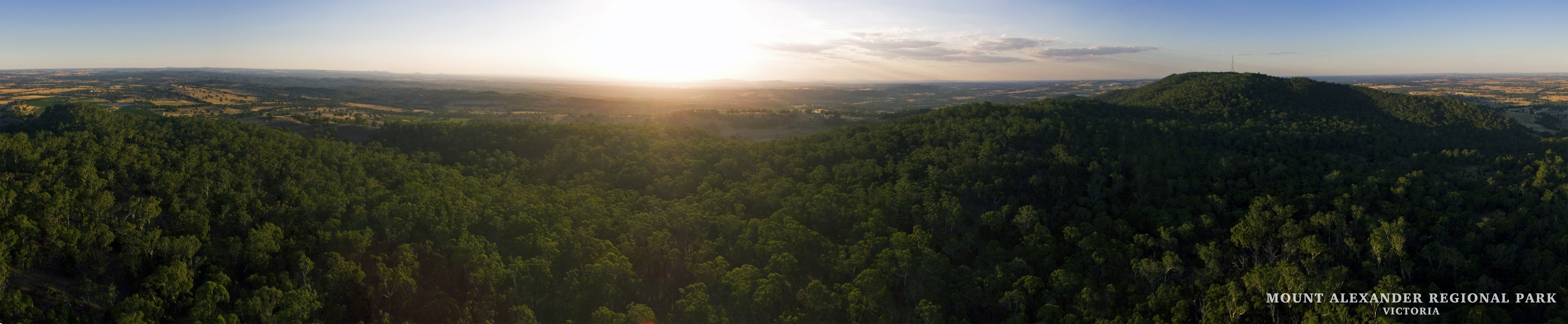
Mt Alexander Regional Park

== History ==
=== First Nations ===
The mountain, known as Lanjanuc or Liyanganuk to the Jaara Jaara people, was the location of a sacred ceremonial ground and used as an outlook. The Mount is the eastern side of Dja Dja Wurrung Country and was the home range of their Liarga baluk Clan. In 1840 George Robinson "Saw numerous places where the natives had encamped and where they had their fires or ovens of stones to bake their emu and murnong, which is abundant, and also fish," but in the years following, the Jaara were driven out, and many killed, by squatters. Robinson in his diary entry of 22 January 1840 observed the disappearance of kangaroo and emu from the mountain, and the destruction of the murnong with the arrival of mobs of sheep on the slopes and surrounding plains. Below the eastern slopes in the Sutton Grange area, squatter William Bowman, who arrived in 1838, was reported by Protector of Aborigines Parker for his “habit of shooting every black man, woman or child whom he met on his run” assisted by his stockman Benjamin Reed. George Robinson wrote that Reed "…has had several collisions with the natives, it is feared many have been of a fatal character to the aborigines". Bowman later sold up and moved to the Beechworth.

Willman records finding in the 1990s a Liarga baluk water well and oven mound site on the southern slopes. Anderson’s survey identified sixteen unrecorded Aboriginal sites on Mount Alexander in 2012, in addition to a total of 85 local sites then listed on the Victorian Aboriginal Heritage Register (VAHR).

=== European exploration ===
The first European to climb the peak was Major Thomas Mitchell on 28 September 1836 during his journey of exploration through Australia Felix. He named it Mount Byng, after John Byng, 1st Earl of Strafford, a Field Marshal during the Peninsular War, but soon changed it to honour Alexander the Great, emperor of ancient Macedonia. The overlander and explorer, Edward John Eyre, camped the north-west slope of Mount Alexander on 8 February 1838

== Geology ==
Despite having lent its name to the most famous gold-rush of the years 1851 and 1852, and later to the surrounding Shire, the mountain itself is not gold-bearing country. The prominent granitic ridge is part of a horseshoe formation that extends in a crescent extending from Maldon in the south-west, north-east through Ravenswood, south through Mount Alexander, to Elphinstone. It rises from an underlying bedrock of granodiorite, igneous rock of solidified magma 370-80 million years old. True granite is often lighter in colour and sometimes pinkish, but is of similar chemical composition. The sandy loam soils are readily eroded with removal of vegetation.

=== Mount Alexander goldfields ===
It was the Mount Alexander goldfield around Chewton, 15 kilometres from the peak, which was the site of possibly the world's richest surface alluvial goldfield where about 4,000,000 ounces (110,000 kg) of gold was found in the first two years of the rush, from late 1851 to 1853. Mount Alexander Road, the ‘Road to Fortune’ along which gold-miners traveled, and now surrounded by Melbourne's inner northern suburbs, was named for that destination (now Castlemaine).

== Flora ==
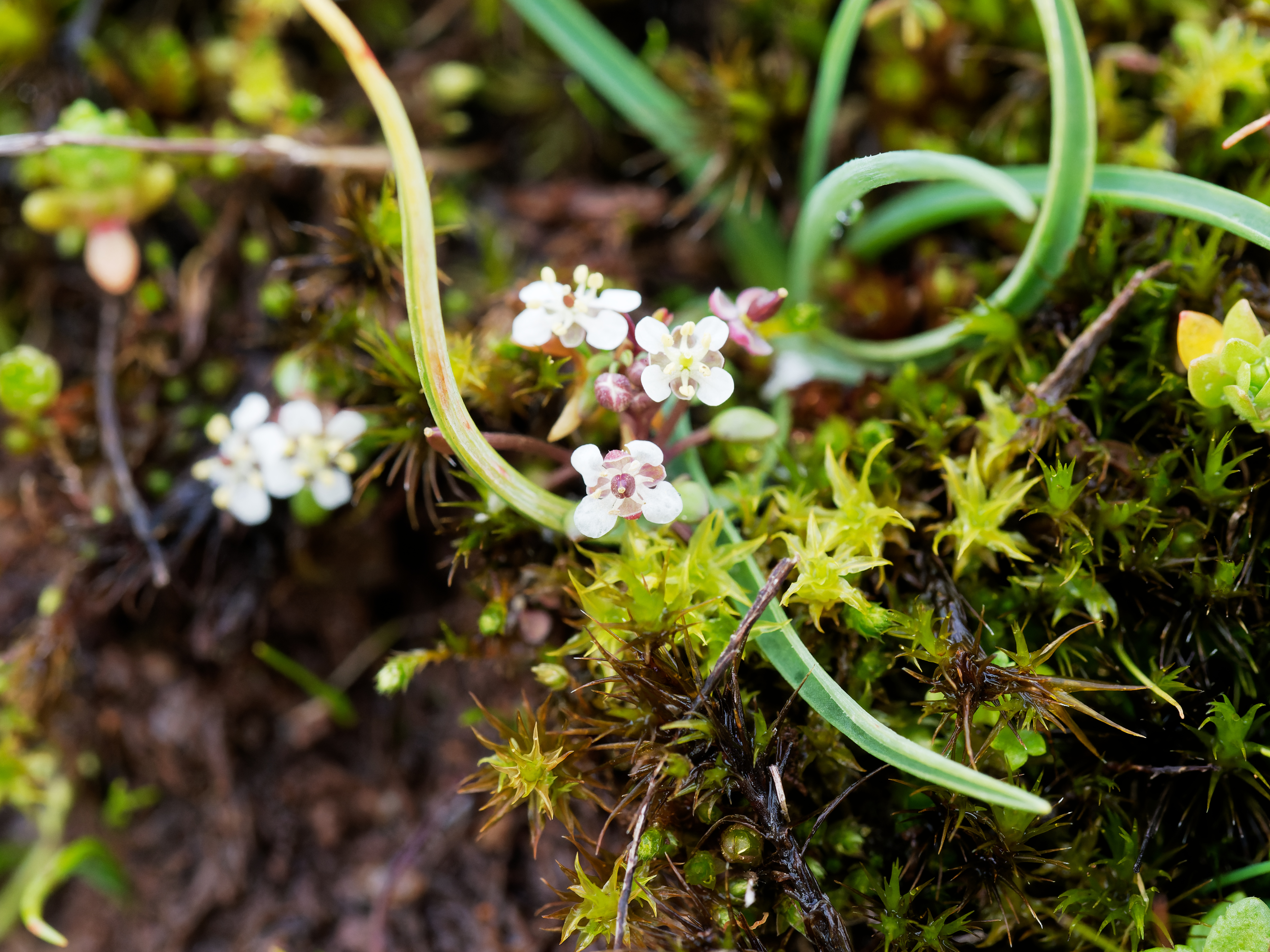
Ballantinia antipoda with flowers and young fruit in August 2024, growing among mosses on Mt Alexander

Mount Alexander hosts a unique native member of the family Brassicaceae called southern shepherd's purse (Ballantinia antipoda or Ballantinia pumilio). This tiny plant grows in small patches of moss on granite outcrops in damp locations. Ballantinia antipoda has become extinct in all other documented sites in Victoria. The plant is nationally recognised as a threatened species.

Smaller flowering plants bluebells, showy isotome, and sticky everlasting appear amongst lightwood, blackwood and hop bush that form the understory of taller species of eucalypt on the Mount including manna gums, candlebarks and messmate stringybark.

== Features ==
=== Dog Rocks ===
A large outcrop of granite boulders on the western slopes of Mount Alexander is known as Dog Rocks. The manager of Sutton Grange Station, Lockhart Morton, named these rocks in 1846 because they were the favourite lair of packs of dingoes. This is now a popular abseiling site.

=== Shepherds Flat Lookout ===
Shepherds Flat Lookout also attained its name in the pastoral, pre-gold rush era.

=== Target Rock ===
Target Rock is a notable feature of the north-west slopes, marking the site of a rifle range utilised by the militia between the Boer War & World War I. A huge bonfire constructed on the summit was lit to honour the visit of the then Duke of Edinburgh in 1867, and a granite cairn marking the summit was built in 1876 and serves as a trigonometric station. Upon the Relief of Mafeking in 1900 the young men of the district erected and lit a bonfire on the summit, this was visible for a very great distance.

=== Langs Lookout ===
Langs Lookout commemorates the efforts of James H. Lang, to have a tourist road constructed across the top of the range. In 1928, Lt-Col. Lang, in his Buick piloted by Alan Lang, and Cr J. R. Duggan in his Chevrolet, accompanied by the Hon H. S. W. Lawson, proceeded across the mount in a zig-zag fashion to prove that such a road was feasible. The party stopped at this lookout before travelling on to the other end of the range. The road that they pioneered is now known as Joseph Young Drive, in honour of the long-serving Metcalfe Shire councillor.

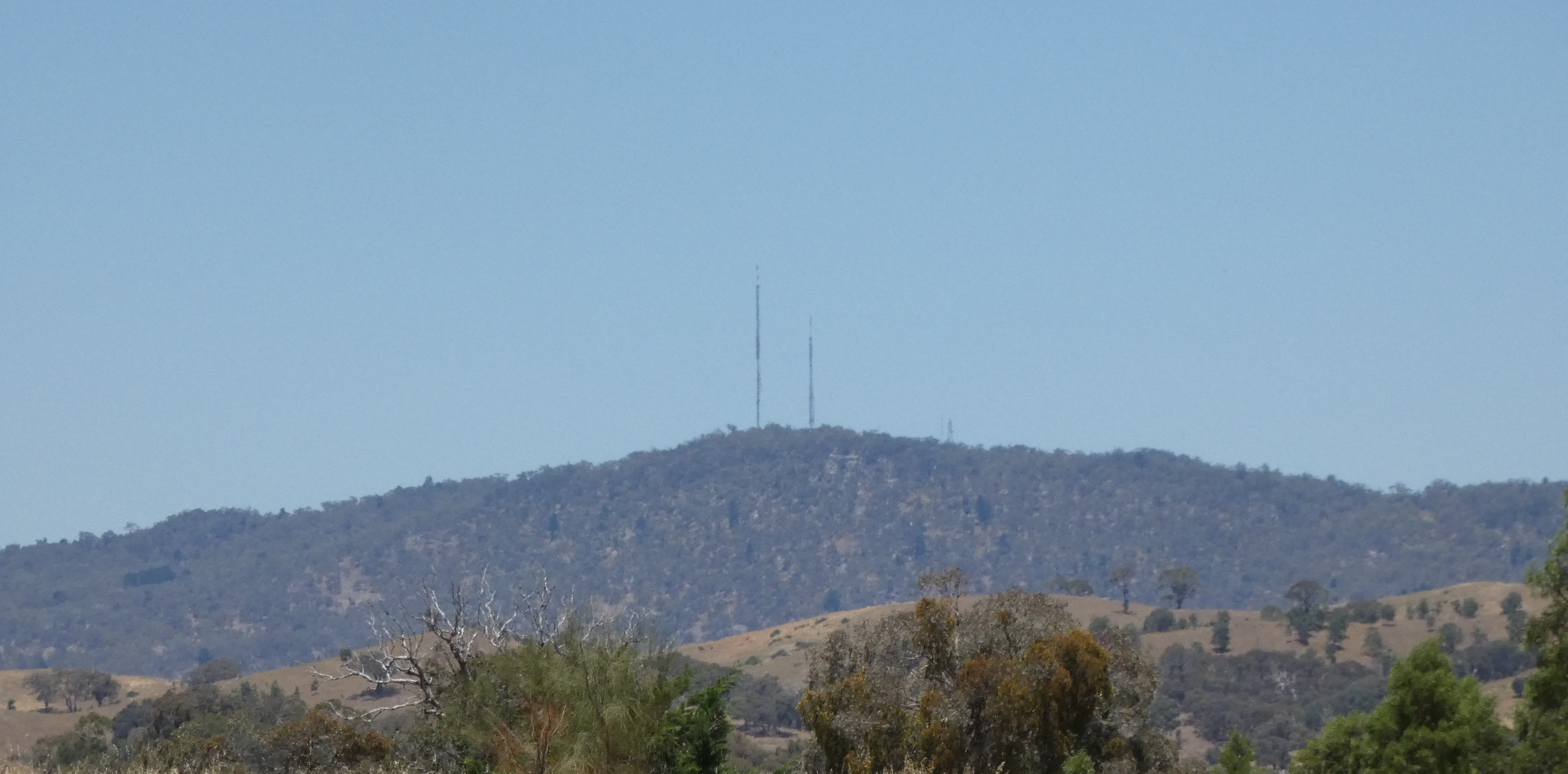
View from Sedgwick

== Quarries ==
Large-scale quarrying of granite on the mountain started in 1859, with stone supplied for the building of the Melbourne to Echuca Railway. Cornish quarryman Joseph Blight had arrived in the colony in 1855 and achieved some success in quartz reef mining at Eureka Reef. He then turned to quarrying at Mount Alexander, at first providing stone for the railway. He began to work the Blight's Quarry site in 1862 Harcourt Granite has earned a reputation as a first-rate building/dimensional stone. It is used for building and monumental work, with waste stone being cut for spalls.

== Cultivation ==
Large areas on Mount Alexander were reserved for use by the Victorian Ladies Sericulture Company. Under the leadership of Mrs Bladen Neill and her manager Jessie Grover, twenty acres were fenced, cleared and planted with mulberry trees. A stone cottage was built and the rearing of silkworms commenced. A quantity of silk was produced but the unsuitability of the situation forced the abandonment of the enterprise in 1876

In 1900 the Lands Department cleared 20 acres at the foot of Mount Alexander at what was known as Picnic Gully and planted a variety of oaks, predominantly valonia oaks, to supply tanning material to local tanneries. In 1910 the first plantation of pinus insignus (Pinus radiata) was established south of the Oak Forest and the strong demand by Harcourt Fruit Growers led to the subsequent expansion of the plantation to provide wood for packing cases. These plantations were harvested for the final time following the leasing of the plantation areas to Hancock Victorian Plantations. The area occupied by the pine trees is being revegetated with native species.

In an attempt to return native fauna to the mount, a Koala Park was established in 1943. The park was stocked with koalas from Phillip Island and managed by a committee of local residents. This park was later relocated and enlarged. It was abandoned in 2009. Leanganook picnic facilities are located near the entrance to the former Koala Park.

== Recreation ==
=== Walking ===
Mount Alexander offers sweeping views from its many recreational walking tracks, ranging in degrees of difficulty from easy to challenging, and it forms a section of the Great Dividing Trail, part of which is a tunnel under the Calder Highway to a narrow easement across private land, set aside by the Mount Alexander Shire in 2009, that permits access to the southwest side of the range from Castlemaine.

=== Biking ===
La Larr Ba Gauwa Park, off Picnic Gully Rd, Harcourt North and opened in 2018, comprises over 34 kilometres of mountain bike trails.

=== Climbing ===
Climbing locations are spread throughout the park and include granite crags and boulders offering tall faces, slabs, chimneys and cracks for traditional and sport climbing, abseiling, and bouldering. In the Dog Rocks and Wabbit Wocks areas particularly, and elsewhere on the mount, over 900 named climbs had been documented and mapped as at 2025.

== Transmission facilities ==
The mountain has a number of transmission sites including:

- Broadcast Tower
- Southern Cross site
- Mt Alexander
- Telstra site
- Optus Site Summit
- Victoria Police site

== See also ==
- List of mountains in Australia § Victoria
