= Lindsay Maine =

Australian rules footballer

Personal information
- Full name: Lindsay Allan Maine
- Born: 6 January 1887; Taradale, Victoria
- Died: 23 September 1969 (aged 82); Caulfield, Victoria
- Original team: Hawthorn Rovers

Playing career^{1}
Years	Club	Games (Goals)
1907–08	South Melbourne	16 (0)
- ^{1} Playing statistics correct to the end of 1908.

Lindsay Allan Maine (6 January 1887 – 23 September 1969) was an Australian rules footballer who played with South Melbourne in the Victorian Football League (VFL).

== Family ==
The son of Allan McNab Maine, and Catherine Maine, née McLennan, Lindsay Allan Maine was born at Elphinstone, Victoria on 6 January 1887.

He married Minnie Josephine Nunan (1889-1969) in 1919.

== Football ==
=== South Melbourne (VFL) ===
He played 16 senior games for South Melbourne, over two seasons (1907-1908).

=== Essendon A (VFA) ===
In June 1908 he was granted a clearance from South Melbourne to Essendon Association Football Club in the VFA.

He played 72 senior games for Essendon A over five seasons (1908-1912), and played three matches for a combined VFA team in 1911.

== Death ==
He died at Caulfield, Victoria on 23 September 1969.
