= Montague Grover =

Australian journalist (1870–1943)

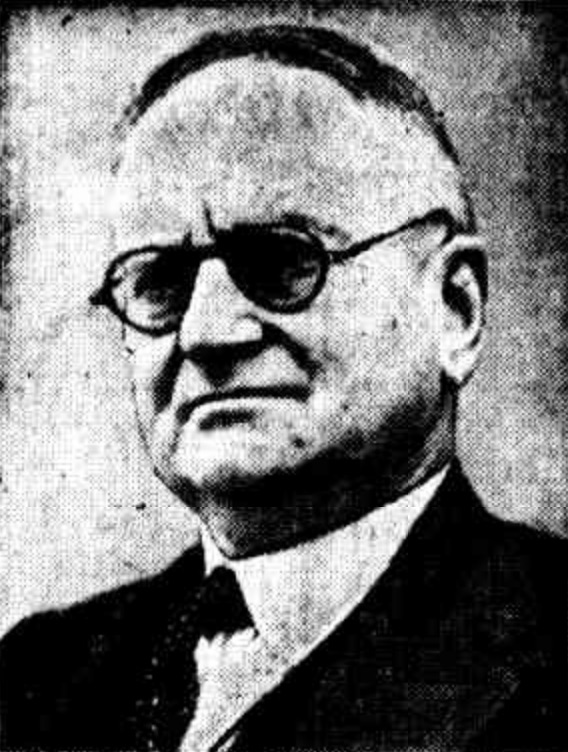
Montague Grover in 1938

Montague Macgregor Grover (31 May 1870 – 7 March 1943), commonly referred to as "Monty" Grover, was an Australian journalist, editor of the Sydney Sun.

== History ==
Grover was born in Melbourne, son of Eton educated Harry (c. 1830–1918) and Jessie Grover (died 1906) of St Kilda, Victoria. His British great grandfather had been a highway robber, his parents were both journalists and his mother was an entrepreneur who tried to launch a silk farm. He was educated at Queen's College, St Kilda and Melbourne Church of England Grammar School.

In 1888 he was articled to a Melbourne firm of architects but when he emerged four years later the country was in a severe recession, with little chance of employment, so turned to journalism.

In 1894 he worked for the short-lived unionist newspaper The Boomerang; (Note: This was the Melbourne paper founded by George Prendergast and Edward Findley; not to be confused with The Boomerang, a similar publication in Brisbane) later that year he joined the literary staff of Melbourne's The Age. He transferred to the "Argus" in 1896.

In 1902 he visited London as secretary to J. C. Williamson.

=== Sydney ===
He was sub-editor of the Sydney Morning Herald 1907 to 1910, and while on that newspaper was responsible for Australia's first bold headlines.

In 1910 Hugh Denison purchased the Australian Newspaper Company, whose publications included Sydney's old and ailing evening Sun (until 1909 The Australian Star) and the Sunday Sun, aiming to oust the Evening News as the top afternoon paper, and appointed Grover editor-in-chief. He served as The Sun's representative in London 1918–1921. Grover has been credited with "discovering" Jimmy Bancks, whose Us Fellers was first published in the "Sunbeams" section of the Sunday Sun, thus introducing Ginger Meggs to millions of young Australians.

=== Return to Melbourne ===
In 1922 he returned to Melbourne with the intention of founding the Evening Sun in competition with The Herald, but had some problems with an overseas cable contract, so in the interim founded the Sun Pictorial. In 1924 Denison sold The Sun and Sun Pictorial to Keith Murdoch, who promptly combined the two institutions. He was 1929–1930 he was magazine editor for the Herald and later made a tour of the world, contributing articles to the Herald and Sun.

In 1931–1932, he edited The World a (labour) Sydney afternoon daily. He also served for a time as Melbourne editor of The Bulletin.

Around 1939 he made a tour of the western districts of New South Wales and Victoria, writing articles for Smith's Weekly on some of the regional towns, including Camperdown and Cobden.

Grover died at his home on Alexandra Avenue, South Yarra. The ceremony at Springvale Crematorium was attended by many journalists and newspapermen, including G. A. Kennedy, Watkin Wynne, Vance Palmer, R. H. Croll, and R. W. E. Wilmot.

== Tribute ==
There have been many brilliant writers produced by this country during that time, but not one has been as versatile, nor recognised so universally as outstanding. Not a man who worked under him, and there have been thousands, ever had anything but praise for his leadership, all were inspired by his keenness for a good story, they loved his sense of humor, his outright honesty, and his insatiable appetite for scoops. He knew what the public wanted, when they picked up a newspaper and human interest stories were always featured in the papers he edited.

The annual Montague Grover memorial prize competition for cadet journalists was named for him.

== Publications ==
- The Sleeping Beauty and the Beast (1903)
- The Minus Quantity and Other Short Plays (1914)
- Judah and the Giant (1915)
- The Time Is Now Ripe (1937), a (socialist) economic thesis
- Hold Page One (1993), memoirs

some verses by Grover were included in

- The Australian Favourite Reciter, W. T. Pyke, ed. (1907)
- The 'Bulletin' book of Humorous Verse and Recitations (1920)

== Family ==
Grover married twice; to Ada Goldberg (1877–1928) in 1897, divorced 1910, and in 1915 to Regina Varley, daughter of Edward Varley. He had three sons and four daughters, including:

- Harry Grover, on the staff of the Herald and A.I.F. News
- daughter married Arthur Cannon. She was on the staff of The Argus.
- Moira Grover married William L. Sayle in 1927
- Junee Grover (1909–1984) married Alex Gurney on 16 June 1928
