= Jessie Grover =

Australian journalist and sericulturist (1843 – 1906)

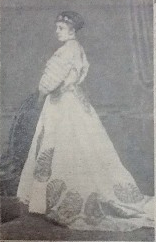
- Born: Jessie McGuire; 9 June 1843; Melbourne
- Died: 17 March 1906 (aged 62); St Kilda
- Occupations: journalist and sericulturist
- Known for: silk farmer
- Spouse: Harry Ehret Grover
- Children: Montague Grover

Jessie Grover (9 June 1843 – 17 March 1906) was an Australian journalist and sericulturist. She helped to set up a silk farm that would be owned and employ women, but the mulberry trees and the silk worms did not thrive.

== Life ==
Grover was born in 1843 in Melbourne. Her parents were Elizabeth Jane (born Price) and her husband William McGuire and she was the last of their four children. Her grandfather had been a highway robber. The Grovers owned the Red Lion Inn in central Melbourne's Lonsdale Street. Her father died the following year and after a few years her mother leased the inn but she continued to run the guest house business.

Her father's brother ran the Emu Inn at Shepparton on the Goulburn River and it was probably there that she met her future husband. She had been sent north to live with her uncle. She married Harry Ehret Grover in 1869 at what is now called St James Old Cathedral. Harry had been in the country since 1851. He had been to school at Eton College and he had been working for the police in Shepparton. Her son Montague Grover was born in the following year. Monty Grover would follow his parents into journalism.

She came to notice in 1873 when she and Sara Florentia Bladen-Neill, who was the part owner of Brockelsby Station at Corowa, decided to start an unusual company. The idea was to plant mulberry trees so that they could farm silk worms and create silk for export. Grover was to be the managing director and any other directors of the company had to be women. One of the purposes of the businesses was to find gainful employment for women in Victoria. The Victorian Ladies' Sericultural Co. Ltd was formed by the issue of £4 shares which were bought mostly by women.

Grover became the manager of the enterprise living at a cottage on Mount Alexander where the mulberry trees had been planted.

In 1876, Mrs Bladen Neill asked for all ladies who were involved in silk production to meet her on 22 and 23 December. She wrote a letter to the Argus to explain that she was an agent for a firm in London who were willing to buy silk from the colonies and she noted the prices that could be obtained in London before the silk was spun for stockings.

The mulberry trees did not succeed. The trees became victim to frost, lack of water and rabbits and the original plot was abandoned in 1877. At a meeting in Melbourne Town Hall, Grover noted that the directors knew that the soil of their original land would not support mulberry trees. Grover proposed that the company's share capital should be increased from £5,000 to £10,000 with a reissue of shares at £1 each. Continued silk farming would be based on the River Murray near Corowa where land would be purchased that already had 1,600 mulberry trees growing. Grover said that trees were being moved from the company's old land and more trees had been donated. Investment was expected in the company from England and she reassured the audience that they may have heard news of the creation of Artificial silk, it was in no way comparable to real silk. Sara Bladen-Neill was burned in an accident with a kerosene lamp in about 1881. In Bladen-Neill's obituary in 1884 it was noted that although the silk business was a philanthropic idea, the manufacture of silk had never been profitable. Not only did the trees have to grow but the young insects needed to thrive, and they did not.

Grover's mother died in 1879, leaving Grover and her husband with sufficient funds to buy a house in St Kilda. She and her husband were journalists. She would cover charity events for newspapers. Their income also came from investments until the bank crash of 1893.

Grover died in 1906 in the Melbourne suburb of St Kilda. The ruins of the silk farm abandoned in 1877 still stand.
