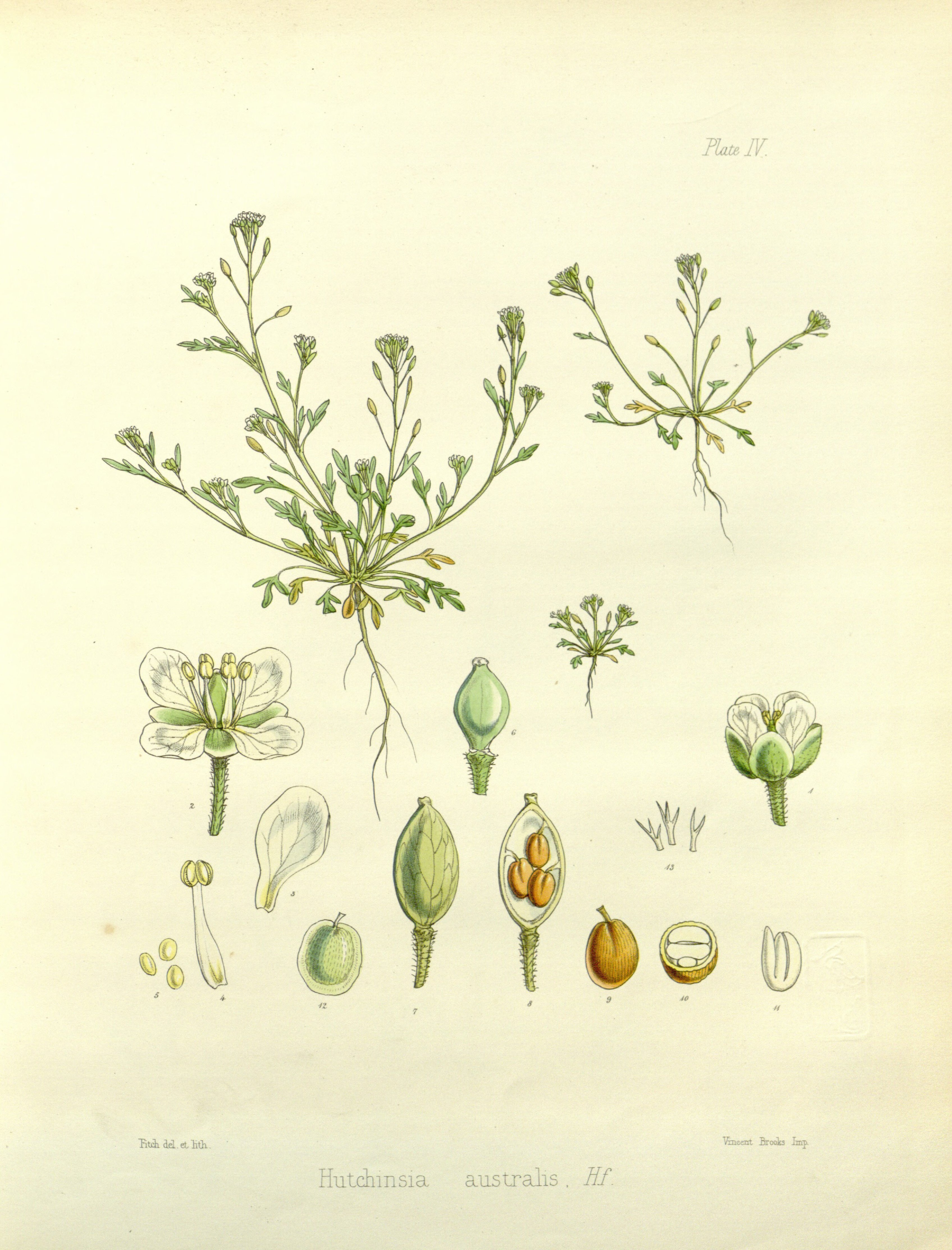
- Ballantinia pumilio (as Hutchinsia australis Hook.f.

Scientific classification
- Kingdom: Plantae
- Clade: Tracheophytes
- Clade: Angiosperms
- Clade: Eudicots
- Clade: Rosids
- Order: Brassicales
- Family: Brassicaceae
- Genus: Ballantinia; Hook.f. ex Airy Shaw
- Species: B. pumilio

Binomial name
- Ballantinia pumilio (R.Br. ex DC.) Mabb.

Synonyms
- Ballantinia antipoda (F.Muell.) Airy Shaw; Bursa antipoda (F.Muell.) Kuntze; Capsella antipoda F.Muell.; Capsella antipoda F.Muell.; Capsella australis (Hook.f.) Hook.f. ex Benth.; Cuphonotus antipodus (F.Muell.) J.M.Black; Cuphonotus australis (Hook.f.) O.E.Schulz; Draba pumilio R.Br. ex DC. (1821) (basionym); Hutchinsia australis Hook.f.

= Ballantinia =

Genus of flowering plants

Ballantinia is a genus of plants in the family Brassicaceae. Ballantinia pumilio, commonly known as southern shepherd's purse, is the sole species in the genus. It is a small annual herb growing on granite outcrops at high elevations. Formerly more widespread, it is currently restricted to Mount Alexander in central Victoria. It was formerly native to central and northern Tasmania but is presumed extinct on the island. The species is listed as 'Critically Endangered' under the Victorian Flora and Fauna Guarantee Act.

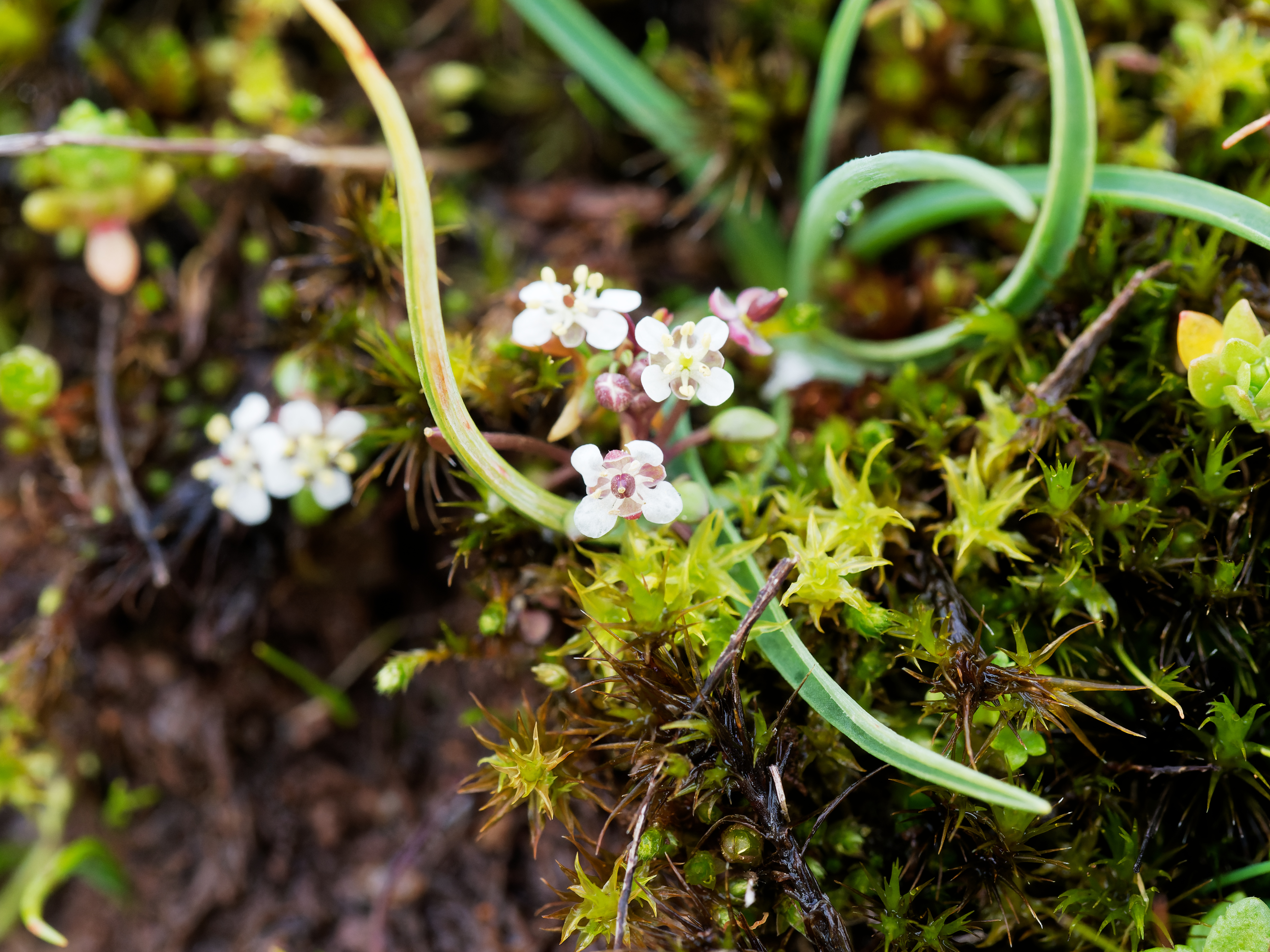
Ballantinia pumilio with flowers and young fruit in August 2024, growing among mosses on Mt Alexander
