= Elphinstone Hotel =

Pub in Elphinstone, Victoria, Australia

Coordinates: 37.10283286°S 144.33231597°E

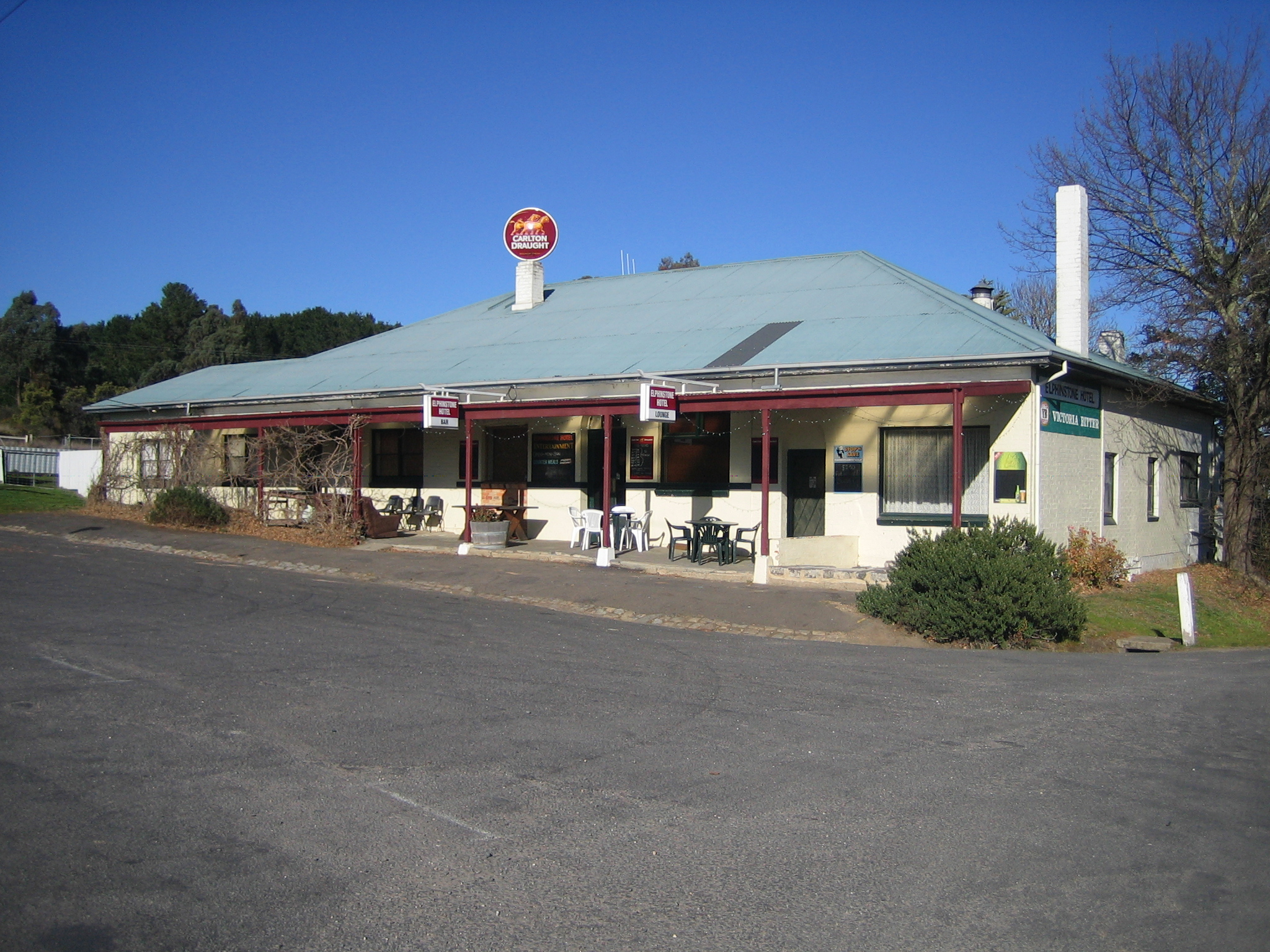
The Hotel in 2006

The Elphinstone Hotel is an Australian pub located in Elphinstone, Victoria, originally named the Commercial Hotel and known over the years as Lonsdale’s Hotel, Doran’s Hotel, and Tagell’s Hotel.

== History ==
In the 1840s, Elphinstone was known as Sawpit Gully and was renamed in the early 1800s. Built c. 1860 and first commercially licensed by Sarah Fyans in 1871. In 1875 Sarah Fyans married Friedrick Richard Lonsdale and the licence transferred to him until his death in 1889.

Sarah Lonsdale owned the hotel until approximately 1905 when it was purchased by Newman & Co. Members of Sarah’s family ran the hotel until 1921, (50 years) except for 4.5 years when it was leased to Joseph Archer. In 1922, a public telephone and exchange were located there as well as a store, which operated from the present day lounge until the 1960s, when it was moved to the newly built Elphinstone Post Office.

Before refrigeration, the hotel cellar was used to store the bodies of deceased locals before burial. Inquests were also held at the hotel.

From the 1920s to the 1950s, publicans struggled to make a living from the hotel and by 1955 the hotel was literally falling down. When the Victorian Licensing Board threatened to revoke the licence a group of local graziers (Jim Barty, Alf Fletcher, Alan Finning, Ringan Oliver, Ian MacRae, and Louis Smith), fearing the town would die if the hotel closed, pooled 500 pounds each to purchase the freehold and renovate the hotel.

== Description ==
The Elphinstone Hotel is a large building (approx. 480 sq. metres) and has the appearance of a mid 1900s hotel even though it was built in the 1870s. Major renovations in 1956 have changed the building’s form to a corrugated iron, wide hipped roof adorned by two 1950s style chimneys. A straight, pitched veranda, (3 x 23 metres) at the front is slung from below the roofline. The veranda has no decoration and is supported by plain timber posts on concrete stumps. The original old brick walls are now clad in stippled concrete and painted cream. The timber sash windows and French style double glass doors to the bar and rear entrance, were obviously replaced during the 1950s renovations . Although much has changed, the hotel has many original features including the underground blue stone cellar which may even pre-date the building of the original brick hotel. The hotel sits on a large triangular allotment (approx. 75 x 40 x 86 metres), which is surrounded by a dark green Colorbond fence. Many old hand made bricks were uncovered during the construction of the fence, possibly the chimney remains of the Freemason’s Tavern which burnt down in 1879. An old iron and red gum shedding which sat on the southern fence line of the property was rebuilt in 2016 to the same original design and style. The small paddock on the south eastern corner of the property is used by the hotel as a customer Horse Paddock for those who ride horses to the hotel. Situated next to the Swan Hill railway line, the hotel along with the historic Elphinstone Railway Station, Bateman’s Garage and the war memorial form an historic triangle of the township.

== Licensees ==
Licence started	Licence Ended	total years operated	Name of Owner/s
4 Oct 1871	1876	5 Years	Sarah Fyans
1876	17 Dec 1889	13 Years	Richard Lonsdale
17 Dec 1889	25 Apr 1890	1 Year	Mrs Sarah Lonsdale
25 Apr 1890	26 Apr 1895	5 Years	Joseph Archer
26 Apr 1895	18 May 1900	5 Years	Mrs Sarah Lonsdale
18 May 1900	9 May 1921	21 Years	Patrick John Horan
9 May 1921	03 Apr 1922	Years	Alfred Lewis Western
03 Apr 1922	06 Jul 1922	1 Year	Joseph Endall
7 May 1923	TBC		Sarah Christina Stevenson
23 Nov 1937	14 Nov 1945	8 Years	William Georoge Brown
11 Jun 1949	TBC		Colin Beaumont
01 Jan 1954	01 Jan 1957	3 years	Bill Tagell
01 Jan 1957	27 Jul 1959	2 years	Clarence Ian Clifft (LIC.) & Nellie emily May Clifft
27 Jul 1959	08 Aug 1961	2 Years	Allen Cecil Hunter (LIC.) & Elaine Joyce Morgan
(Awaiting missing	info	for this	date range)
01 Jul 1993	01 Jul 1996	3 Years	John O'Neil (LIC), Ann O'Neil
01 Jul 1996	01 Sept 1998	2 Years	Helen Anderson (LIC), Pamela Dean
(Awaiting missing	info	for this	date range)
01 Sep 2000	01 Jun 2002	2 Years	Dave Rust (LIC.) & Gill Maskell
01 Jun 2002	01 Jun 2004	2 Years	Cherylynn Quinn
(Awaiting missing	info	for this	date range)
01 Oct 2005	1 Oct 2009	4 Years	Ashley Okeefe
(Awaiting missing	info	for this	date range)
14 Dec 2013	09 Dec 2019	6 Years	Mani Heck (LIC.) & Chris Saunders
09 Dec 2019	04 JUN 2021	1.5 Years	Mark Fattore (LIC), Melanie Fattore
JUN 2021	AUG 2022	1.5 years	Hollie Walton (LIC.)
18 AUG 2022	05 MAY 2023	9 Months	Guryad "Garry" Singh (LIC.)
06 MAY 2023	Current	Current	Dapinder Jot Singh (LIC.)

(LIC. = Licensee)
