= Metcalfe East =

- Town
- Coordinates: 37°8′54″S 144°27′45″E
- Country: Australia
- State: Victoria
- LGA: Shire of Mount Alexander

Government
  - State electorate: Macedon
  - Federal division: Bendigo

Population
  - Total: 25 (2021 census)
- Postcode: 3444

Metcalfe East is a locality in the Shire of Mount Alexander, Victoria, Australia. At the 2021 census, Metcalfe East had a population of 25.
