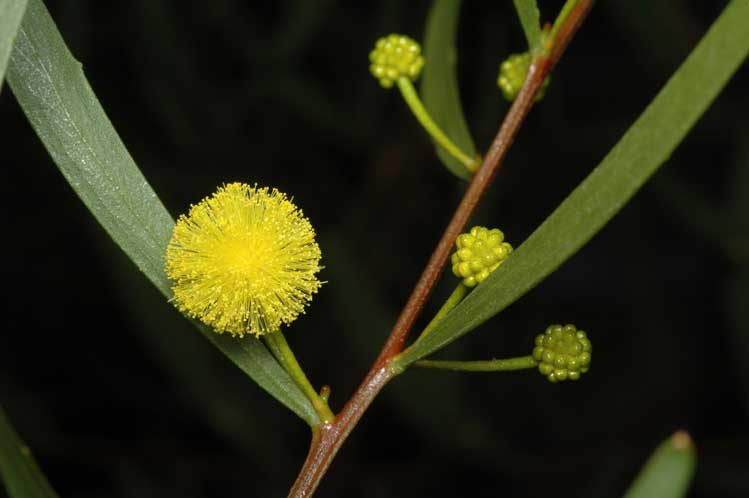

Scientific classification
- Kingdom: Plantae
- Clade: Tracheophytes
- Clade: Angiosperms
- Clade: Eudicots
- Clade: Rosids
- Order: Fabales
- Family: Fabaceae
- Subfamily: Caesalpinioideae
- Clade: Mimosoid clade
- Genus: Acacia
- Species: A. dodonaeifolia

Binomial name
- Acacia dodonaeifolia (Pers.) Balb.
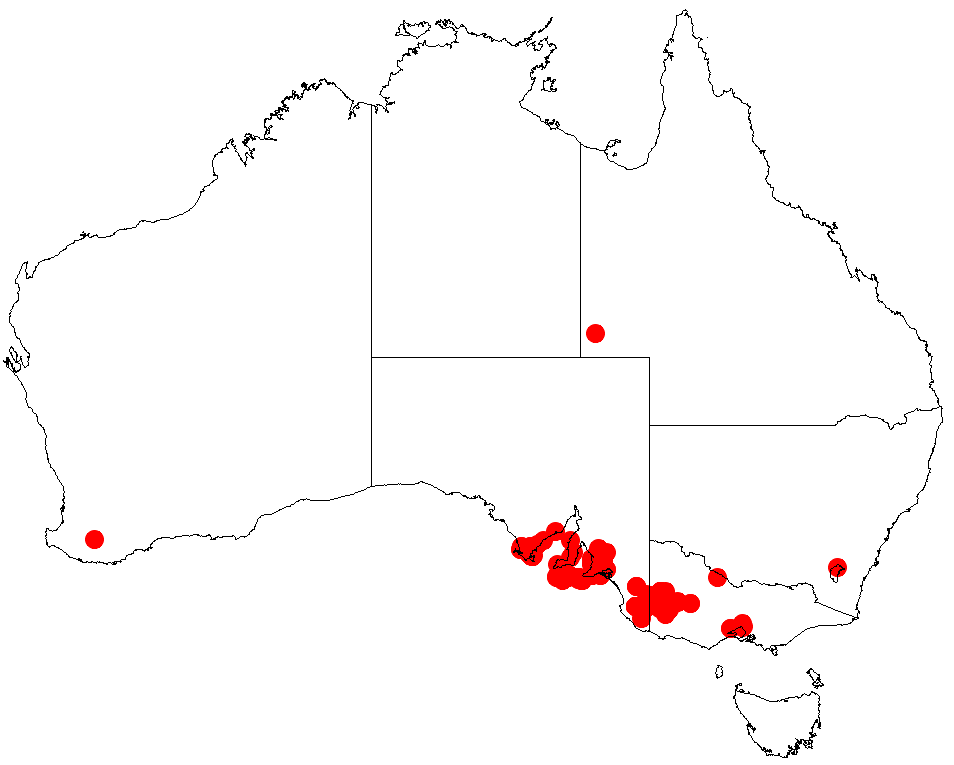
- Occurrence data from AVH

Synonyms
- List: Acacia dodonaeaefolia Spreng. orth. var.; Acacia dodonaeifolia Willd. nom. inval., nom. nud.; Acacia dodonaeifolia Willd. ex Spreng. nom. illeg.; Acacia dodonaeifolia (Pers.) DC. isonym; Acacia dodoneaefolia Balb. orth. var.; Acacia metrosiderifolia Steud. nom. inval.; Acacia visciflua F.Muell. nom. inval.; Acacia viscosa Schrad. ex H.L.Wendl.; Mimosa dodonaeifolia Pers.; Phyllodoce dodonaeifolia Link; Racosperma dodonaeifolium (Pers.) Pedley

= Acacia dodonaeifolia =

Species of plant

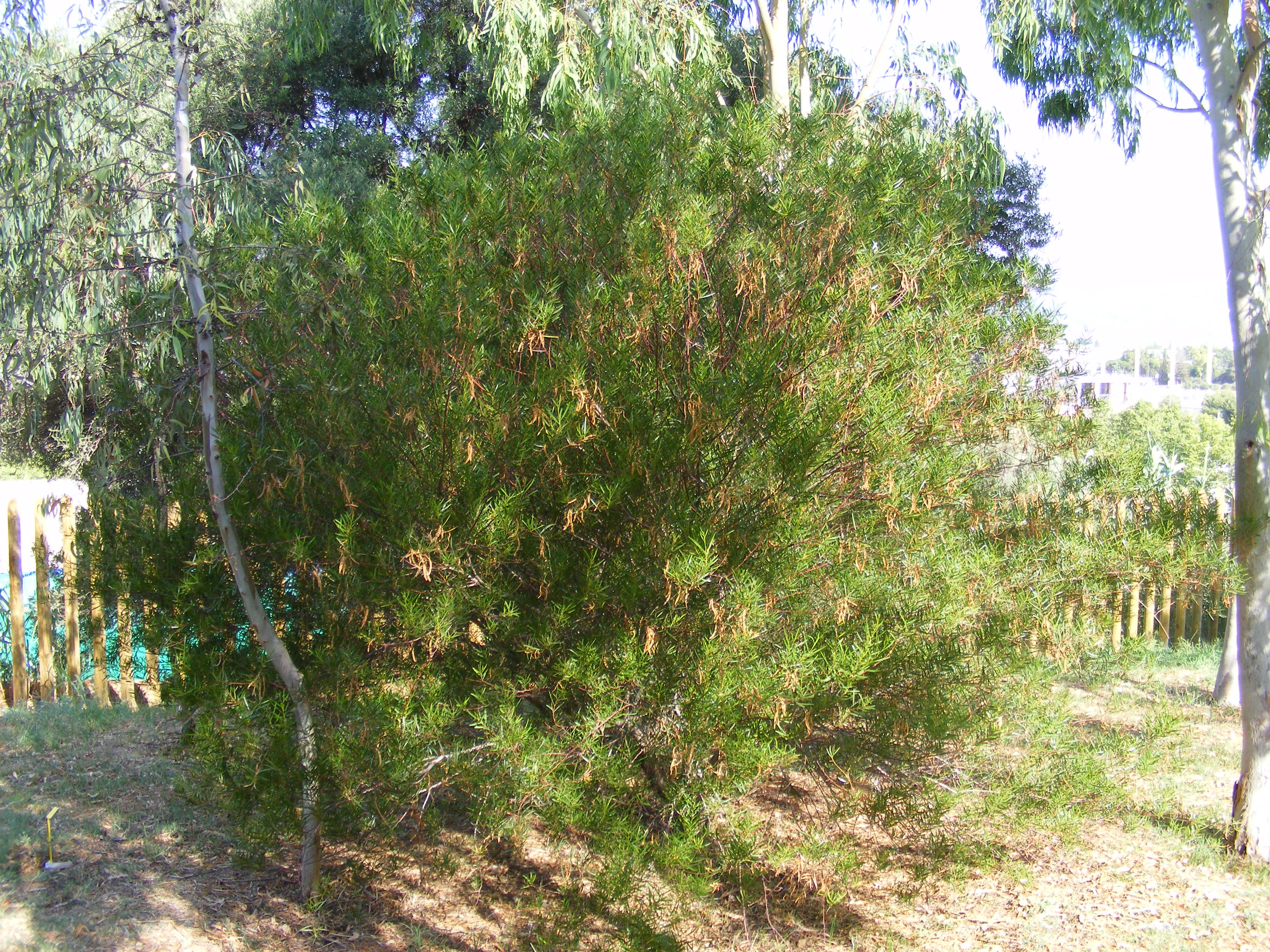
Habit in the Barcelona Botanic Gardens

Acacia dodonaeifolia, commonly known as sticky wattle or hop bush wattle, is a species of flowering plant in the family Fabaceae and is endemic to the south-east of continental Australia. It is a sticky glabrous shrub or tree narrowly elliptic phyllodes, spherical heads of bright yellow flowers and linear, thinly leathery pods.

== Description ==
Acacia dodonaeifolia is a sticky, glabrous shrub or tree that typically grows to a height of 2–6 m (6 ft 7 in – 19 ft 8 in) and has varnished branchlets when young. The phyllodes are usually narrowly elliptic, 40–80 mm (1.6–3.1 in) long and 5–11 mm (0.20–0.43 in) wide, glabrous, slightly roughened with prominent midrib with two or three glands up to 5 mm (0.20 in) above the base of the phyllode. The flowers are borne in two or three spherical heads in axils on peduncles 7–15 mm (0.28–0.59 in) long, each head with 36 to 46 bright yellow flowers. Flowering occurs between July and November, and the pods are linear, thinly leathery, up to 130 mm (5.1 in) long, 5–7 mm (0.20–0.28 in) wide and light brown. The seeds are oblong to elliptic, shiny dark brown, 4.3–5 mm (0.17–0.20 in) long with a folded aril on the end.

== Taxonomy ==
This species was first formally described in 1806 by the Christiaan Hendrik Persoon and given the name Mimosa dodonaeifolia in his Synopsis plantarum. In 1813, Giovanni Battista Balbis transferred the species to Acacia as A. dodonaeifolia. The specific epithet (dodonaeifolia) means having leaves like a dodonaea.

== Distribution and habitat ==
Sticky wattle usually grows in sand or loam in Eucalyptus woodland in open forest in scattered locations from the Eyre Peninsula to Naracoorte and Keith in South Australia and the west of Victoria.

== See also ==
- List of Acacia species
