= Elphinstone, Victoria =

Elphinstone
- Town
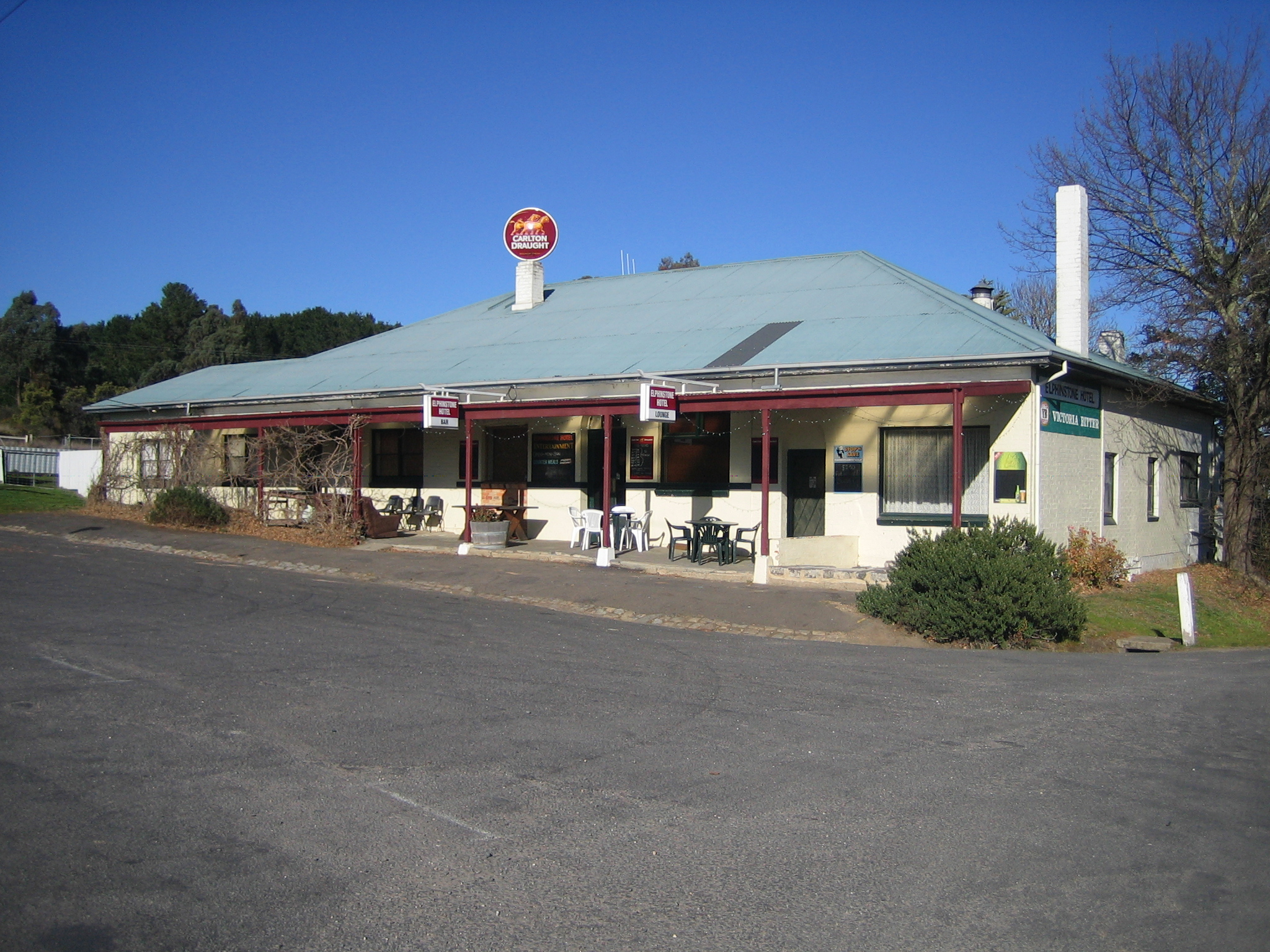
- Elphinstone Hotel in 2006

- Interactive map of Elphinstone
- Coordinates: 37°06′S 144°20′E
- Country: Australia
- State: Victoria
- LGA: Shire of Mount Alexander
- Location: 109 km (68 mi) NW of Melbourne; 43 km (27 mi) S of Bendigo; 13 km (8.1 mi) E of Castlemaine

Government
  - State electorate: Macedon
  - Federal division: Bendigo
- Elevation: 422 m (1,385 ft)

Population
  - Total: 555 (2016 census)
- Postcode: 3448
Localities around Elphinstone
Barkers Creek	Metcalfe	Metcalfe
Fryerstown	Elphinstone	Metcalfe
Fryerstown	Drummond North	Kyneton

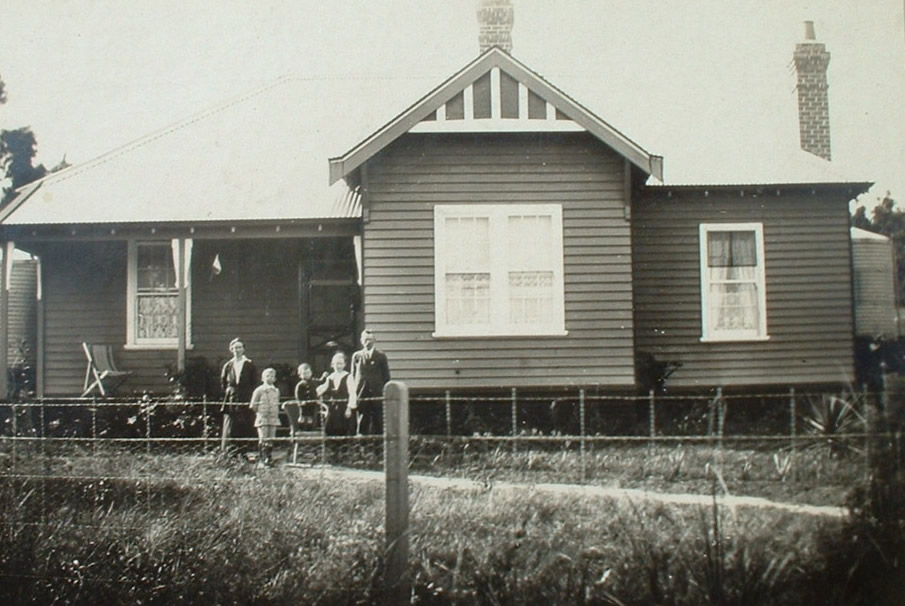
Primary teacher, William Waugh and family, at the Elphinstone school residence, about 1918

Elphinstone is a town in Victoria, Australia. The town sits at the junction of the former Calder Highway and the former Pyrenees Highway between Malmsbury and Castlemaine near Taradale and Chewton. Its local government area is the Shire of Mount Alexander.

The town has a disused railway station on the Bendigo Line.

At the 2011 census, Elphinstone and the surrounding area had a population of 670.

The town was originally called Sawpit Gully, but was renamed Elphinstone after Baron Mountstuart Elphinstone, Lieutenant-Governor of Bombay from 1819 to 1827.

The town's hub is the Elphinstone Hotel in Wright Street. Elphinstone's fair, renowned for its specialty foods and boutique local wines, is usually held in mid-November each year around the time of the fair in nearby Kyneton. It is called the 'Sawpit Gully' fair, in honour of the town's original name.

The countryside around Elphinstone is well known for its diverse flora and fauna which attract local and visiting bush walkers. The local terrain of undulating hills and gently winding roads also brings a number of cyclists and motorcyclists.

Elphinstone Post Office opened on 1 February 1854.

Cable and Wireless Optus built their first solar powered base station at Elphinstone in 2001. By making the mobile phone tower solar powered the company did not have to put expensive electrical power cables through the nearby state forest. The tower would improve reception in the Elphinstone area.

Elphinstone is also well known for its apple and pear industry. For many years there were 5 large orchards, 4 being owned by members of the Pollard family. The other by the Mertikis family. Only two remain one owned by Louise Mertikis and one by Gary Pollard.

The town also had a garage on the old Calder Highway which is now the corner of Thomas Street and Wright Street. It became the Elphinstone Fire Brigade and Metcalfe group headquarters during the 1990s and early 2000s until it was decommissioned and the new fire station was built next door. It is now used for storage and training for the brigade.

Opposite the hotel was Bateman's garage which the late Daisy Bateman and her husband Vic ran for many years. It is now an engineering plant that makes steel sculptures.

Census Date - Town population

1861 - 187

1871 - 404

1891 - 125

1911 - 204

1933 - 146

1954 - 173

1966 - 151

2011 - 670
