= Timor, Victoria =

Timor Victoria
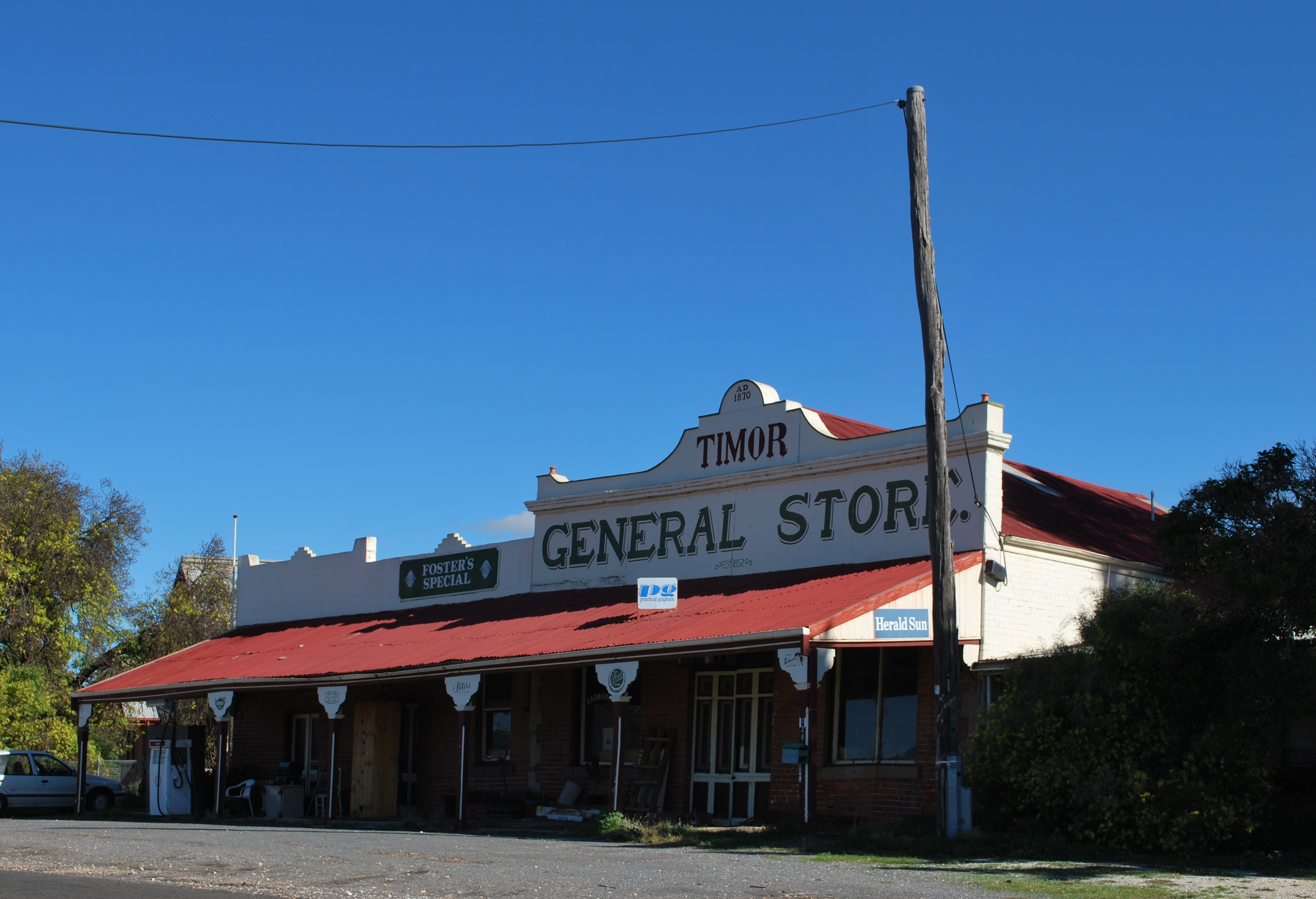
- Bowenvale-Timor General Store, closed in 1997

- Coordinates: 36°59′3″S 143°42′33″E
- Population: 68 (2021 census)
- Postcode(s): 3465
- Location: 178 km (111 mi) NW of Melbourne; 69 km (43 mi) SW of Bendigo; 80 km (50 mi) N of Ballarat; 8 km (5 mi) N of Maryborough, Victoria
- LGA(s): Shire of Central Goldfields
- State electorate(s): Ripon
- Federal division(s): Mallee

Timor (/ˈtaɪˈmɔː/), is a locality in Central Goldfields Shire, Victoria, Australia. Timor is located 8 kilometres (5 mi) north of Maryborough, Victoria and 178 kilometres (111 mi) northwest of Melbourne, the state capital. At the 2021 census, Timor had a population of 68.

== History ==
=== Names ===
Places names used in the area over time have included "of the Bet Bet", Chinaman's Flat, Butcher's Bridge, Cox'sTown/Coxtown, Upper, Central, and New Chinaman's, Leviathan Reef, Timor Creek/Lower Alma, Lime Kiln Plains/Timor West, Dwyer's Bridge, Bowenvale, and Timor.

The term "Bet Bet" must be identified by its context, as its use in earlier times was not only for the Bet Bet Creek. Locations near the Bet Bet Creek were referred to as "of the Bet Bet" and shortened to "Bet Bet". That is not to be confused with the current Bet Bet hamlet, further downstream on Route C278, which in earlier times was known as Grant's Bridge. Much historic documentation, especially maps, includes the word lead, representing an underground line of gold deposits.

The historical records for the area are confounded not just by changing place-names, local names, and changing boundaries, but by the Timor, but not Bowenvale, area being at the crossroads of divisions between various Colonial/State Government administrative sections, including between the Counties of Talbot and Gladstone, between the civil Parishes of Bet Bet, Maryborough and Wareek, between the former local government Shires of Bet Bet and of Tullaroop, which surrounded the Borough, later City of Maryborough, and between modern administrative regions. Most authorities used the Bet Bet Creek as a boundary, but the Town of Timor straddles it. In Victoria, civil parishes are used for cadastral (land-ownership) records, with the shared boundary between the Parishes of Maryborough and Bet Bet being partly Bet Bet Creek Road, and between the Parishes of Maryborough and Wareek partly the Timor Creek.

=== Early history ===
The area was a small part of the territory of the Djadjawurrung people. The first non-Indigenous people arrived, from Britain, in the late 1830s, and thereafter. They created two huge sheep runs, later known as Charlotte Plains and Norwood. The Bowenvale-Timor area straddles a section of their shared boundary.

In 1839, the British Parliament created the Port Phillip Protectorate with the aim of bringing the First Nations people together in regional Protectorate locations in order to "civilize" them. The Charlotte Plains and Norwood sheep run areas were in the area of the Loddon Protectorate, founded by Assistant Protector Edward Stone Parker, firstly on the Loddon River at Neereaman in 1840, but after a dry season, which was wrongly thought to be typical, moved it further south, upstream, to Willam-e-barramul [place of the emu] now Franklinford. The Protectorate system was abolished in 1849. The comments made about the region's indigenous people by Norwood pastoral squatter (from January 1852), Alfred Joyce, in his reminiscences, give some insight into tensions of early colonisation.

=== Early gold-winning era ===
The first gold discoveries occurred in 1854 or 1855. By June 1855, newspapers regarded "Chinaman's Flat" as a well-known site for gold-seekers and used "the head of Chinaman's Flat" to describe an area to the west of the current Maryborough-Bowenvale-Timor Road about 5 km from modern Maryborough. This name came from the groups of Chinese immigrants largely from Guangdong Province in southern China who made up a significant proportion of the early gold-seekers there.

==== Butcher's Bridge and Cox Town ====
The tracks from the 1854-established Maryborough area to the Chinamans Flat diggings, and from the Bet Bet Creek, by carriers of water to process the "stuff" - the earth thought to contain gold -, became well-established during the next twelve months, with a less-formed continuation from the Bet Bet Creek to the Dunolly diggings. Towards the end of 1856, that shorter route between Maryborough and Dunolly was greatly improved by a young publican/entrepreneur named Cox Butcher (Note: Although publications since 1856 have increasingly described the builder of the first bridge over the Bet Bet Creek and nearby Bridge Inn as "(Mr)Cox, a butcher," it is known that that is incorrect, the evidence being his 1829 baptism, 1841 UK Census record, 1853 Adelaide marriage, and Butcher family knowledge, confirming his name was Cox Butcher, son of a Mary, nee Cox, and a Matthew Butcher, supported by their marriage record. Cox Butcher, the publican of White Hills (Havelock) and then of his Bridge Inn, was severely wounded trying to stop a fight near the Inn in late 1856 and died in early 1857. Both his full death registration and inquest records show Cox was his first name and Butcher his surname. Reports of his rise, decline and death in the nearest surviving newspapers now reproduced online, the "Maryborough & Dunolly Advertiser" and the "Mount Alexander Mail" of Castlemaine, also "The Age" of Melbourne, correctly report his name as Cox Butcher, whilst the "Bendigo Advertiser" and "The " Star" of Ballarat, style him as "Cox, a butcher." The origins of the error may be a legal notice in the "Bendigo Advertiser", published in three issues in April 1856, where the witness(es) was/were recorded as being "Cox, Butcher," perhaps the result of unclear notes from the solicitor, or a typesetting error. The 1860 letters of the Correspondent for the Board of Local Patrons for the establishment of salary funding for the nearby national "Bet Bet Creek School 38, Goldfields", (later Dwyer's Bridge State School), James McKenzie, refers to "Cox Butcher's Bridge". Nonetheless, the idea that the Bet Bet Creek bridge publican's surname was Cox, and his occupation, a butcher, has persisted.) who built a bridge and an accompanying inn, called The Bridge, at the Bet Bet Creek crossing. That location became known as Butcher's Bridge and then Cox('s) Town, gradually shifting towards Coxtown.

In October 1856, a major rush to a particular point on the Chinaman's Flat Lead began, resulting in the co-incidental discovery of a gold-bearing quartz rock reef later named the Leviathan. Urban areas grew along both sides of the underground Chinaman's Flat Lead/surface Chinaman's Flat Creek. the west side including shops, a church of the Primitive Methodist denomination, a Post Office named Chinaman's Flat, and at least one private school, George Hesketh's. The east side, also called Chinaman's Flat, was spread along the main Maryborough to Dunolly via the Butcher's Bridge/CoxTown track, was more commercial, and included a substantial privately owned, Mechanics Hall (not Institute) as part of an hotel's business, and a Church and Hall of the Wesleyan Methodist denomination.

In 1860, several kilometres further north, near the junction of the now Bet Bet Creek and McKenzie Roads, the community of mainly farmers created above the bank of the Bet Bet Creek, a school which became National School No.38 "(of the) Bet Bet" Goldfields. It closed as State School 38 Dwyer's Bridge in 1877. In 1863, following more than a year of agitation and petitioning by the community, under the 1862 regulations for Common (government-regulated/supported, pupil fee-paying) Schools, which replaced those for National Schools, Common School 714 Chinaman's Flat opened in the western community, eventually housed in a solid-brick building on what is now Denyers Road, where a sign in a paddock on the east side identifies its long-term location.

==== Establishment of Timor and decline of Chinaman's Flat ====
By 1857, the Maryborough & Dunolly Advertiser was predicting that CoxTown would eventually become a permanent creek-crossing development. By October 1861, the Tullaroop Road Board and the Bet Bet Road Board, whose shared boundary was the Bet Bet Creek, were in negotiations, encouraged by letters to the Maryborough and Dunolly Advertiser, to replace Cox Butcher's bridge with a more solid one with side rails. On 20 August 1866, an already surveyed town named Timor, but a name not consistently used locally, was gazetted as Timor. Its location was north of what is now Bet Bet Creek Road, located in the civil Parish of Bet Bet and straddling the Bet Bet Creek itself (thus located in the successors to the road boards, the Shire of Tullaroop and the Shire of Bet Bet).

In 1869, the Lower Wareek/Timor West community established Common School 949 Lower Wareek/Timor West on the Timor-Dunluce Road, which closed in 1942 as State School 949 Timor West.

Chinaman's Flat, with its areas of Upper Chinaman's, Central Chinaman's, and New Chinaman's, was initially the larger community, but as gold-winning became more complex and capital intensive, people moved north to be closer to the huge mining operations exploiting the mainly north-trending leads nearer to and beyond the Bet Bet Creek. Increased numbers of permanent buildings were constructed around the junction of the Maryborough-Timor-Dunolly Road and Bet Bet Creek Road. In March 1880, State School 1207 Timor, after seven years in various temporary premises along the Maryborough-Timor Road in Chinaman's Flat (as that part was gradually being known as Bowenvale), moved into the current school building in Timor, just over the Chinaman's Flat border. It was later substantially extended in weatherboard.

In the south-western corner of Chinaman's Flat, closer to Maryborough, an increasing number of "reefers" (extractors of gold from quartz rock reefs) in the remaining population were working the productive Leviathan mine and several smaller parallel gold reefs. The immediate community and Chinaman's Flat School 714 were renamed Leviathan Reef. The school closed in 1902, with some pupils transferring to S.S.1207 Timor, and others to S.S.848 Alma The local "Chinaman's" names were gradually changed to Bowenvale, but the name of the main drainage course, Flat Creek, is still used.

==== Establishment of Bowenvale ====
A "Bowen Park" in Timor, not Chinaman's Flat, was declared on 26 January 1874 after George Bowen, Governor of Victoria 1873–79.

The first use of the name "Bowenvale," for sections of Chinaman's Flat seems to have been before November 1877. It was applied to the electoral division of that area in the Electoral District of Maryborough & Talbot. The Electoral Registrar was an Edward Beedon of Chinaman's Flat.

By January 1884, newspapers were using "Bowenvale" for a location, in a non-electoral capacity. In the February, the Government changed the name of the Post Office from Timor to Bowenvale.

On 11 January 1887, the centres of the areas known as Chinaman's Flat, Central Chinaman's, and New Chinaman's along the main road from the boundary with Timor at Bet Bet Creek Road towards Maryborough, were gazetted as an unnamed town. The documentation proclaiming its name as Bowenvale, or news of that, has not yet been found.

=== Late 19th century and 20th century ===
Gradually the deep mines were overwhelmed by underground water, in spite of increasingly large pumping plants. The mines used long beam engine water pumps, with beams of up to 30 tons, consuming huge amounts of the surrounding forests for steam-boiler fuel. Two of the massive stone fulcrums of the pump beams are still standing.

Large scale mining ceased during World War I. The extraction of gold from many heaps of mullock (waste material from the mines), using cyanide and a far smaller workforce, lasted much longer. Much of the gravel from the leads and reefs was removed for construction.

Miners gradually moved away to areas of ore or coal mining and onto other employment in New South Wales, particularly Broken Hill, or Western Australia, Queensland, New Zealand, or South Africa. Many others moved to cities, or the areas to the north of Victoria, particularly those areas along the Maryborough to Mildura railway line, including along its Murrayville-Pinnaroo, South Australia, branch, which had benefitted from the 1910 sale of many thousands of hectares of its adjoining Mallee Scrub Crown Land. Many buildings were relocated by jinker from the Bowenvale-Timor area to Maryborough or to developing farming areas, some over long distances.

At Easter 1926, a memorial, without names, to the large number of local men and the woman who had volunteered to serve in World War I was unveiled in Bowenvale, attended by hundreds, many of them part of the "Back to Maryborough District" excursion, mainly transported (to Maryborough) by special trains, popular at the times. Not long after, a solid-brick Catholic Church, to replace the earlier weatherboard one on the north side of the Creek, was erected nearby, in Timor.

A storm on New Year's Eve in 1960 severely damaged both the Community Hall and the Church of England Church in Bowenvale, which were then demolished. The community replaced the Hall but not the Church. The last hotel in the area, Simmons' "Victoria" in Bowenvale, closed in April 1961, and later was demolished. The last store, in Timor, closed in 1997. The School, S.S.1207 Timor, had its weatherboard extension removed in 1937, and in the 1970s was considered for closure, but is now a district Primary School.

== Points of interest ==
The landscape of the Bowenvale-Timor area includes residential and agricultural buildings as well as evidence of the past, including tall mining ruins and foundations, substantial dams and drainage channels, eroded mullock heaps, abandoned sports facilities, and depressions, evidence of cellars and underground tanks, known as "wells".

Located in Bowenvale are the 1926 World War I memorial, without names, and the most modern public buildings, the 1960s-era Bowenvale Public Hall and the Bowenvale Fire Station. These are bases of district volunteer organisations vital to the sense of district community, and the safety and future of the district as the climate changes. The Fire Brigade Station houses the Bowenvale Fire Brigade, a single-tanker member of the Goldfields Group, District 2, North West Region of the Country Fire Authority.

Located in Timor, on the Bowenvale boundary, are the late 1920s former solid-brick Catholic church, and the substantial 1880 school building which houses the district primary school Timor S.S.1207. The School was first hosted in a Church Hall in (then Chinaman's Flat, now) Bowenvale, where a sizeable site for a permanent school building was eventually identified, but the community could not come to agreement over its suitability.

Also in Timor are a Bills horse trough, and the now-closed general store-post office, the oldest part being built in 1870-71. The two huge wet-mine beam-pump fulcrums, the granite one on the south side of the bridge, the basalt one on private land to the north, mark the sites of their former very deep-lead mines. The curved-top apertures were sightlines for the pump operators, and pipe routes for the water being expelled.

Both the Bowenvale Hall and the Timor School contain more than one important district World War I Honor Board.

The Timor-Bowenvale Cemetery was gazetted on 13 January 1868, for its location in then Chinaman's Flat near the northern edge of the civil Parish of Maryborough. The records of burials before late 1889 were lost in a fire at the premises of the Registrar, Joseph DuBourg. The Cemetery Trustees in recent years have successfully rediscovered the identities of many early interments using death certificates and related records, but the exact locations of early burials without legible headstones have not been identified. The names and years of interment are displayed in a shelter at the Cemetery Entrance, and updated from time to time.

== Notable people ==
- Ted Horsington (1878–1947), N.S.W. politician
- Albert Lauder (1898–1971), Australian Rules footballer
- Jack Worrall (1861–1937), cricketer
- Pat Hickey (1871-1946), footballer
- Bert Boromeo (1892-1971), footballer
