= List of places on the Victorian Heritage Register in the City of Greater Bendigo =

This is a list of places on the Victorian Heritage Register in the City of Greater Bendigo in Victoria, Australia. The Victorian Heritage Register is maintained by the Heritage Council of Victoria.

As of September 2026, the Victorian Heritage Register listed the following 108 state-registered places within the City of Greater Bendigo:

Place name	Place #	Location	Suburb or Town	Co-ordinates	Built	State registered	Photo
Bendigo Fire Station
Bendigo Post Office
Bendigo Senior Secondary College
Capital Theatre
Redesdale Bridge	H1419	Heathcote–Kyneton–Redesdale Rd	Redesdale (Note: Also listed on the VHR in the Shire of Mitchell, as on one side of the bridge is Mia Mia, in the Shire of Mitchell, and on the other side Redesdale, in the City of Greater Bendigo. The bridge is closer to Redesdale than Mia Mia.); Mia Mia	37°00′57″S 144°32′28″E	1867	17 April 2025	
Shamrock Hotel
