= List of places on the Victorian Heritage Register in the Shire of Mitchell =

This is a list of places on the Victorian Heritage Register in the Shire of Mitchell in Victoria, Australia. The Victorian Heritage Register is maintained by the Heritage Council of Victoria.

The Victorian Heritage Register, as of 2026, lists the following four state-registered places within the Shire of Mitchell:

Place name	Place #	Location	Suburb or Town	Co-ordinates	Built	State registered	Photo
Banool	VHR H0752	18–20 Fitzroy St	Kilmore	37.294950°S 144.957120°E	1926	15 November 1989	
Bindley House	VHR H0824	20–22 Powlett St	Kilmore	37.297930°S 144.952270°E	1862	17 October 1990	
Comet Mill	VHR H1816	Harrys Nose Rd	Clonbinane	37.366880°S 145.164840°E	1884	17 June 1999	
Exhibition Goods Shed	VHR HO930	330 Union Lane	Bylands (Note: Relocated to Bylands from Spencer Street Railway Yard in c. 1999.)	37.353430°S 144.966790°E	1880	30 September 1992	
Former Kilmore Post Office	VHR H1190	2 Powlett St	Kilmore	37.296370°S 144.952440°E	1891	23 May 1996	
Habbies Howe homestead	VHR H0336	Dropmore Rd	Dropmore	37.060090°S 145.381680°E	1852	9 October 1974	
Hume and Hovell Monument	VHR H2349	Monument Rd	Kilmore	37.300780°S 144.974842°E	1924	11 June 2015	
John Kelly's Former House	VHR H0940	44 Kelly St	Beveridge	37.480250°S 144.983280°E	1860	30 September 1992	
Kilmore Brewery site	VHR H2375	57 Melbourne St	Kilmore	37.289395°S 144.948136°E	1850	10 August 2017	
Kilmore Court House	VHR H1471	4 Powlett St	Kilmore	37.296550°S 144.952430°E	1863	20 August 1982	
Kilmore District Hospital	VHR H1685	1 Anderson Rd	Kilmore	37.301550°S 144.957990°E	1859	20 August 1982	
Old Goulburn River Bridge	VHR H0092	Old Hume Hwy	Seymour	37.020610°S 145.113840°E	1862	2 March 2006	
Rail Bridge	VHR H1695	Hanford's Creek	Pyalong	37.145620°S 144.872350°E	1890	20 August 1982	
Redesdale Bridge	VHR H1419	Heathcote–Kyneton–Redesdale Rd	Mia Mia (Note: Also listed on the VHR in the City of Greater Bendigo, as on one side of the bridge is Mia Mia, in the Shire of Mitchell, and on the other side Redesdale, in the City of Greater Bendigo. The bridge is closer to Redesdale than Mia Mia.); Redesdale	37.015880°S 144.541450°E	1867	20 August 1982	
Reedy Creek Homestead	VHR H0273	220 Reedy Creek Rd	Broadford	37.239660°S 145.130550°E	1850	9 October 1974	
Seymour railway station	VHR H1591	Station St	Seymour	37.024490°S 145.138470°E	1874	20 August 1982	
St Michael's Catholic Church	VHR H2357	33–35 Wandong Ave	Wandong	37.359070°S 145.029260°E	1891	13 October 2016	
St Patrick's Catholic Church	VHR H0905	37 Sutherland St	Kilmore	37.299940°S 144.948150°E	1857	25 March 1992	
The Towers	VHR H0564	48–50 Victoria Pde	Kilmore	37.291830°S 144.952750°E	1850	28 March 1984	
Whitburgh Cottage	VHR H0774	10 Piper St	Kilmore	37.297660°S 144.950830°E	1857	27 June 1990	
Yan Yean Water Supply System (Note: Also listed on the VHR in the local government areas of City of Whittlesea, City of Darebin, and City of Yarra.)	H2333	various	various	37.777185°S 144.989002°E	1853–57	12 December 2013	
