= Bet Bet railway station =

Former railway station in Victoria, Australia

Bet Bet

General information
- Location: Australia
- Owner: VicTrack

Other information
- Status: Demolished

Services
Preceding station	Disused railways	Following station
Havelock	Mildura line	Dunolly
	List of closed railway stations in Victoria	

Bet Bet railway station was a station on the Mildura railway line, now disused. It was located in the small town of Bet Bet, Victoria. It was opened in 1874. In 1922, it gained a ballast siding to the east of the station. Bet Bet was closed in 1981 and demolished sometime in the late 1980s.
