= Hawthorn Bridge =

Heritage-listed road bridge in Melbourne, Victoria, Australia

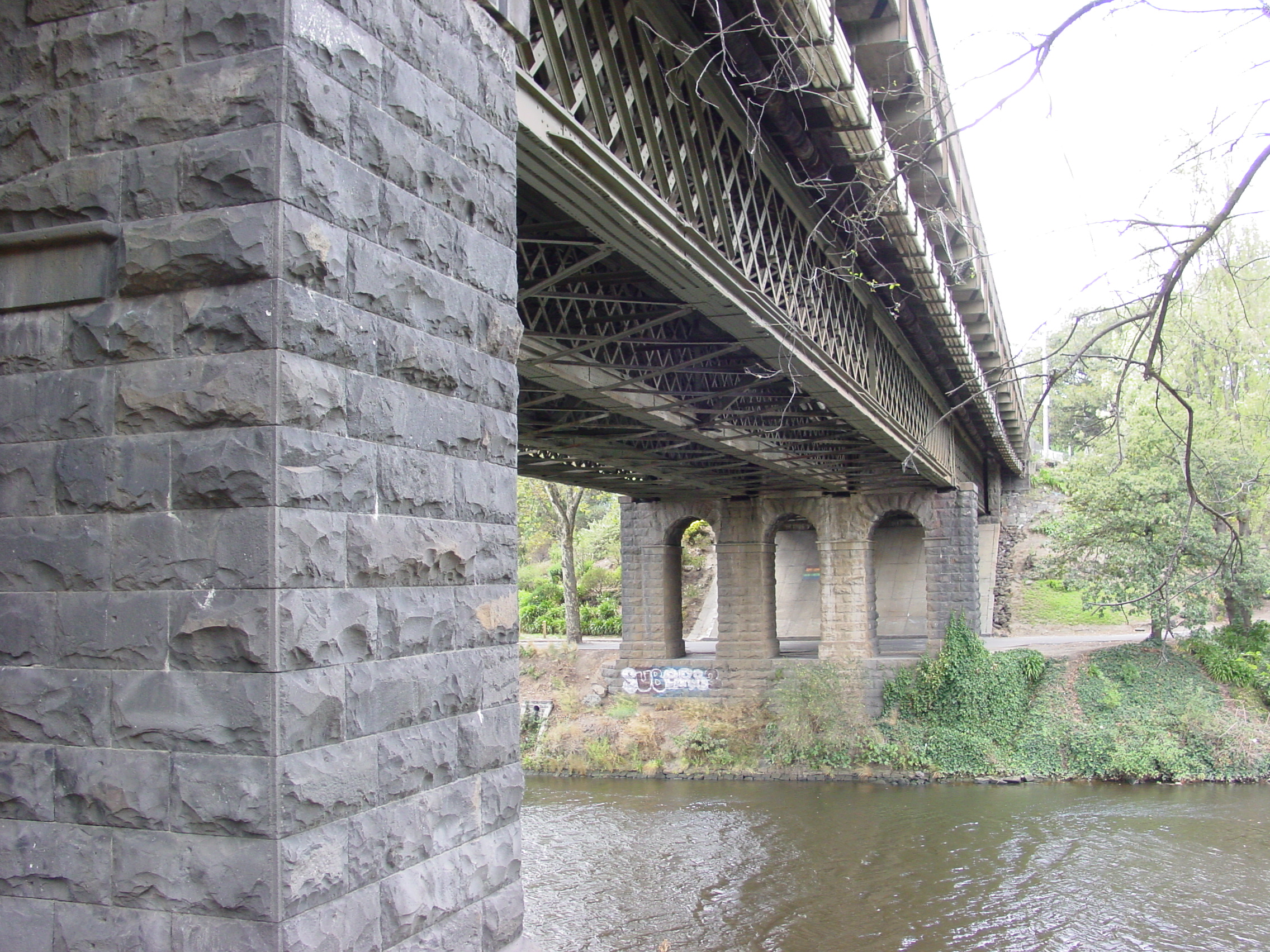
- The underneath of the bridge, 2003
- Coordinates: 37°49′12.4″S 145°0′55″E
- Carries: Bridge Road: Road; –
- Crosses: Yarra River
- Locale: Melbourne, Victoria, Australia
- Begins: Richmond (west)
- Ends: Hawthorn (east)
- Named for: Hawthorn
- Preceded by: Victoria Bridge
- Followed by: Hawthorn Railway Bridge

Characteristics
- Design: Lattice truss
- Material: Wrought iron
- Trough construction: Timber (1891-1928); Reinforced concrete (1931)
- Pier construction: Bluestone
- Total length: 98 m (322 ft)
- Width: 14.3 m (47 ft)
- Longest span: 45.7 m (150 ft)

Rail characteristics
- No. of tracks: 2 (tram)
- Track gauge: 1,435 mm (4 ft 8.5 in) standard gauge
- Electrified: 21 June 1916

History
- Designer: Francis Bell
- Successful competition design: J. McKenzie
- Engineering design by: Public Works Department
- Construction start: May 1857
- Opened: November 1861; 164 years ago
- Rebuilt: 1890, 1931
- Closed: 1929–1931 (for repairs)

Victorian Heritage Register
- Official name: Hawthorn Bridge
- Type: Registered place
- Designated: 8 September 2005
- Reference no.: VHR H0050
- Heritage overlay no.: HO481
- Category: Transport – Road

Location
- Interactive map of Hawthorn Bridge

The Hawthorn Bridge is a truss bridge that crosses the Yarra River, five kilometres (3.1 mi) east of the city centre of Melbourne, Victoria, Australia. Completed in 1861, the bridge connects Bridge Road in Richmond with Burwood Road in Hawthorn. It is the oldest extant bridge over the Yarra River and is one of the oldest metal bridges in Australia. It was constructed in the early wave of major new infrastructure funded by the Victorian gold rush. Designed by Francis Bell, it is a substantial riveted, wrought iron, lattice truss structure, with bluestone abutments and piers. The bridge carries vehicular traffic and Melbourne tram routes 48 and 75.

The bridge was added to the Victorian Heritage Register on 8 September 2005 in recognition of its historic, architectural, scientific (technical), and aesthetic significance.

== History ==
=== Construction ===
Tenders were called on 21 April 1857 by the Board of Land and Works, for erecting the piers for a new bridge and, in the following month, the tender of J. McKenzie was accepted at A£10,000. To obtain better foundations, a slight alteration had been made to the proposed site, while the estimated cost, including cuttings from both Burwood Road and Church Street, was A£40,000. The specified date for completion of the bluestone piers and abutments was December 1857, but they were not finished until February 1858, and the actual cost was £10,065. The wrought iron truss components were ordered from Britain. However, the ship Herald of the Morning, which carried the bridge components to Melbourne in 1859 as deck cargo, caught fire in Hobsons Bay before it could be unloaded, and was scuttled to extinguish the fire. The consignment bridge materials weighed some 320 tonnes (350 short tons) and, together with its erection cranes, had cost A£10,500, so the sinking of Herald of the Morning represented a disaster for Melbourne's metropolitan bridge-building program. The contractors for the bridge were allowed an extension of time to import similar bridge-works from Britain. The ordering, manufacturing and delivery of the new structure delayed completion of the bridge until November 1861.

A report in The Argus gives some further details:

Whilst at Sandridge we paid a visit to the wreck of the Herald of the Morning—a ship which some months ago was burned to the water's edge, and scuttled in Hobson's Bay, In it was a large iron bridge, intended to be erected over the Yarra River at Hawthorne [sic], but it being supposed that it would be entirely destroyed by the fire, the contractors sent home to England for another bridge. The wreck was purchased by Ingles, Adams, and Gresham, of Sandridge, and exertions were made to raise it, but it was not until after weeks of hard labour that success attended their exertions. The hulk was then towed to a pier, and, at length, not only the bridge, but other iron articles, have been redeemed, very slightly injured.

After raising the bridge components, Ingles, Adams, and Gresham, brought the material to Sandridge (Port Melbourne). While the firm was negotiating with the Victorian Government to pay A£6,000 for the salvaged materials, Ingles made the serious mistake of offering Victoria's Inspector-General of Public Works, Thomas Higinbotham, a two and half per cent commission on the agreed price. A parliamentary row ensued, the negotiations were voided, and the salvage firm was erased from the Government's list of approved contractors.

The pioneer Melbourne foundry of Langlands and Co. purchased the salvaged bridge materials for A£2,000, and spent several hundred pounds repairing or modifying the bridge sections. However, there seems to have been no obvious market for the 320 tonnes (350 short tons) of materials, and the foundry ended up selling 180 tonnes (200 short tons) of it to the combined rural shires of Metcalfe and McIvor, who had received a substantial Government grant for the construction of the Mia Mia Bridge at Redesdale. The price was A£1,000, and Langlands disposed of the remainder at "scrap iron" rates. The 180 tonnes (200 short tons) of wrought iron bridge materials had originally been priced at around A£6,000, so the Goldfields shires were pleased with their purchase.

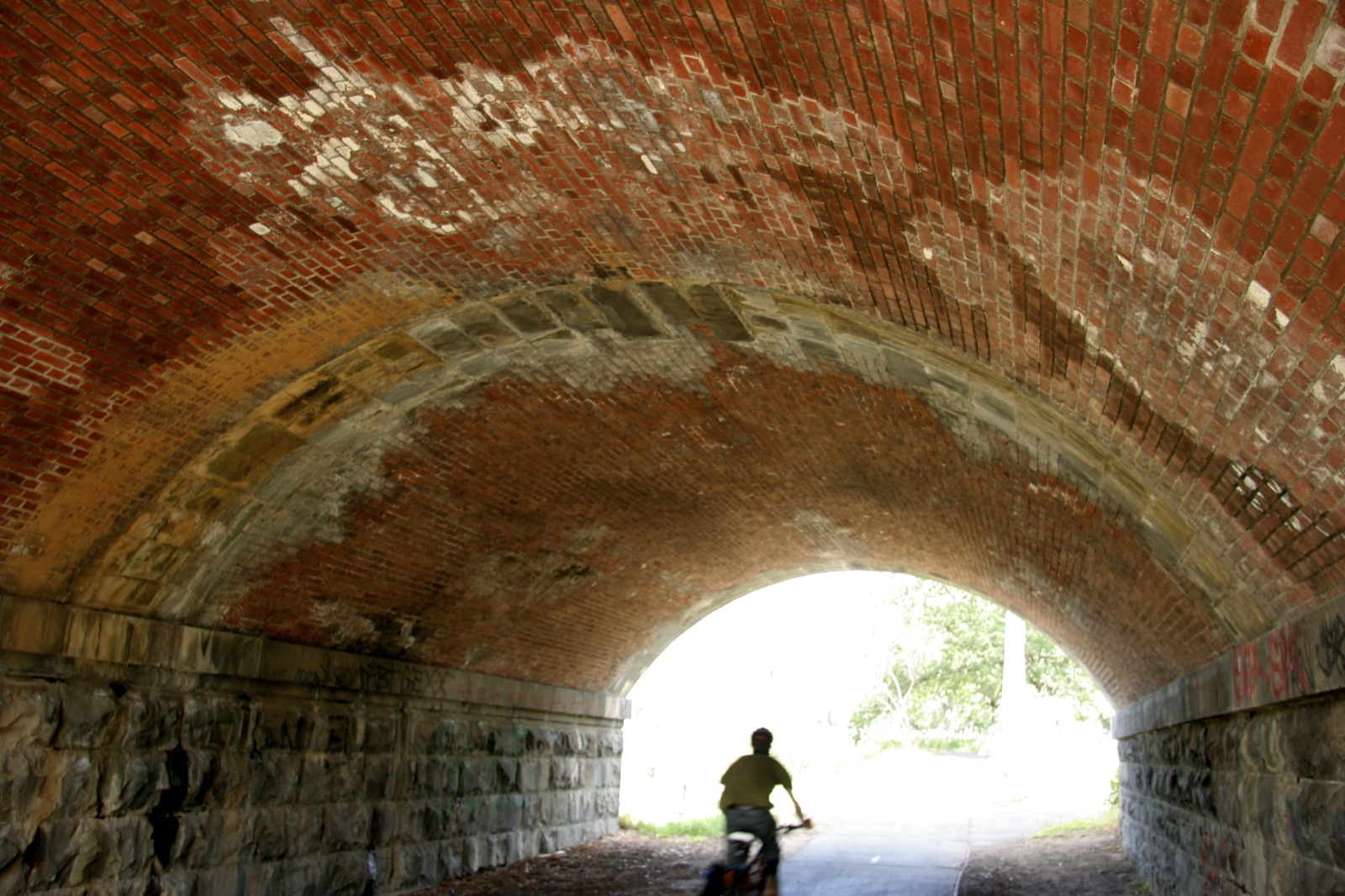
Cyclist on the Main Yarra Trail that passes through one of the bridge piers

The designer of the bridge has not been confirmed. However, because it was one of the largest Public Works Department undertakings at the time, it is plausible that Higginbotham, an accomplished engineer and the Inspector-General of Roads and Bridges in the Public Works Department of the Board of Land and Works, may have had a hand in it. The design and construction work probably benefited from the knowledge and skills obtained by the Melbourne and Suburban Railway Company when building its bridges at Cremorne and Hawthorn in 1860-1.

=== Subsequent developments ===
In 1885, the Hawthorn Bridge was the destination of Melbourne's first tram service that replaced the system of horse-drawn trolley cars. The bridge was widened in 1890—to accommodate the horse-drawn trams—by extending the double-arched bluestone piers and abutments to triple arches and adding a further lattice truss girder. In 1916 the Hawthorn Tramways Trust erected steel gantries to carry overhead wires for the newly-electrified trams connecting Hawthorn and Camberwell.

As the bridge joins two municipalities and is crossed by a tramway, there have always been problems with management, on-going maintenance and finance. In 1928, when funds to repair or replace the bridge were unavailable, a Richmond City engineer declared it unsafe and closed it. The Victorian Government was forced to act and, after much debate, the bridge was repaired, strengthened and widened by the Railways Construction Branch, using in-situ electric arc welding. The timber deck was also replaced with reinforced concrete. The deck of the bridge retains its 1931 appearance, but the trusses, piers and abutments underneath appear as they were in 1861.

== See also ==
- Crossings of the Yarra River
- Glenmona Bridge
- Redesdale Bridge
- List of places on the Victorian Heritage Register in the City of Boroondara

Next bridge upstream	Yarra River	Next bridge downstream
Victoria Bridge (vehicles; pedestrians; cyclists)	Hawthorn Bridge	Hawthorn railway bridge (railway)
