= Redesdale Bridge =

Heritage-listed road house in Victoria, Australia

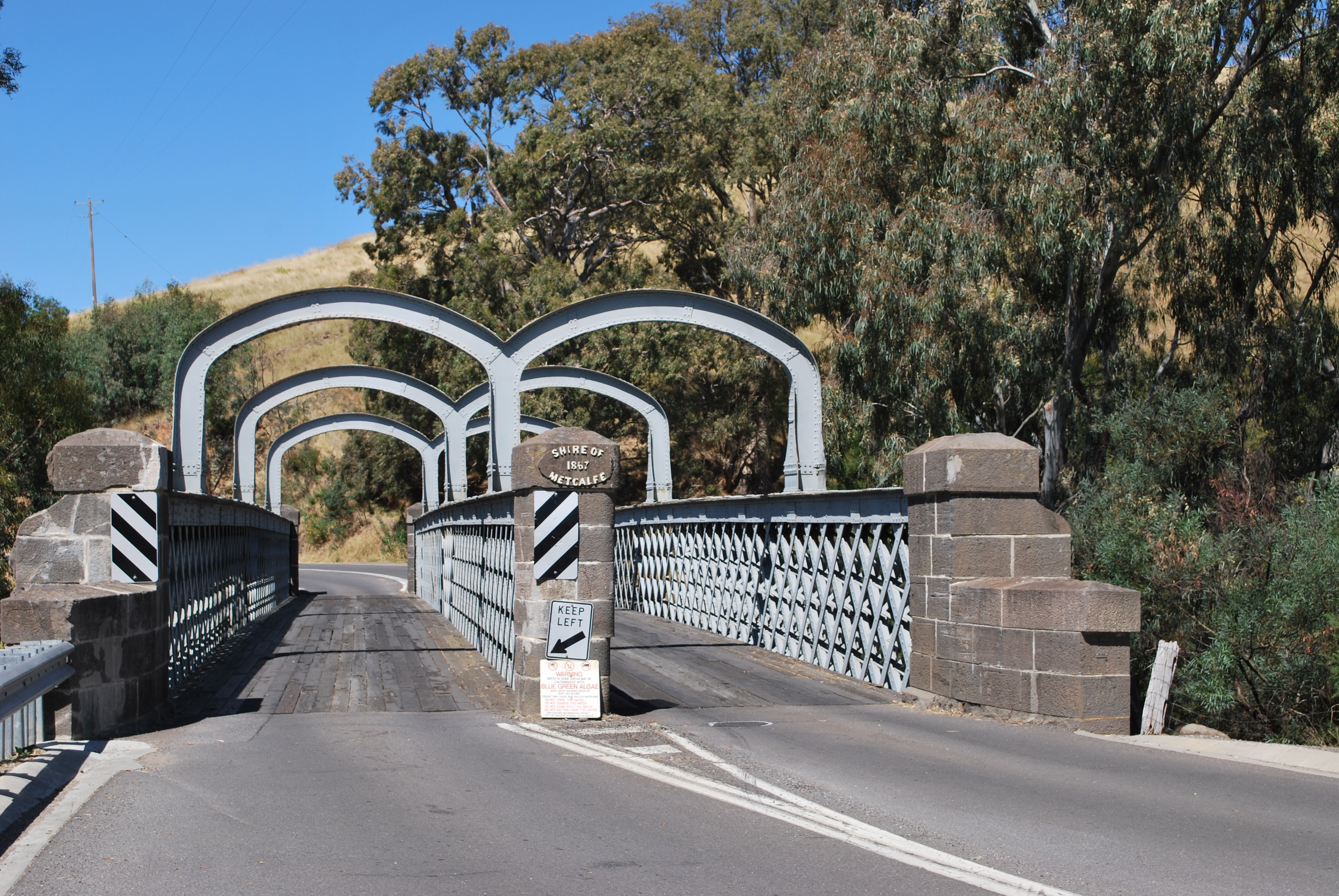
- The dual carriageway bridge with central stone plaque, dated 1857, in 2011
- Coordinates: 37°00′57″S 144°32′28″E
- Carries: Heathcote–Kyneton Road /; Heathcote–Redesdale Road (C326)
- Crosses: Campaspe River
- Locale: Redesdale, Victoria, Australia
- Begins: Redesdale, City of Greater Bendigo, Loddon Mallee
- Ends: Mia Mia, Shire of Mitchell, Hume region
- Other name: Mia Mia Bridge (until 2015)

Characteristics
- Design: Truss bridge
- Material: Wrought iron; Timber (deck); Bluestone (abutments)
- Total length: 60 m (200 ft)
- Width: 14.3 m (47 ft)
- Longest span: 54.7 m (179 ft)

History
- Designer: T. B. Muntz
- Constructed by: Thomas Doran
- Construction end: 1867; 159 years ago
- Construction cost: £6,274
- Opened: 23 January 1868
- Replaces: Open ford

Victorian Heritage Register
- Official name: Redesdale Bridge
- Type: Registered place
- Designated: 17 April 2025
- Reference no.: H1419
- Heritage overlay nos.: HO648, HO230
- Category: Transport – Road

Register of the National Estate
- Official name: Redesdale Bridge
- Type: Defunct register
- Designated: 21 March 1978
- Reference no.: 4252

Location
- Interactive map of Redesdale Bridge

The Redesdale Bridge is a truss bridge that carries the Heathcote–Kyneton Road / Heathcote–Redesdale Road (C326) across the Campaspe River, located in Redesdale, in Victoria, Australia. Built in 1867, it is one of the oldest wrought iron lattice-truss bridges in Victoria, with a timber deck and bluestone abutments, and is most unusual for its two separate traffic lanes.

Located on the traditional lands of the Dja Dja Wurrung and Taungurung people, the bridge was added to the Victorian Heritage Register on 17 April 2025 in recognition of its historical and architectural significance; and was also added to non-statutory lists by the Victorian branch of the National Trust on an unknown date, and the now defunct Register of the National Estate on 21 March 1978.

The bridge connects Redesdale, in the City of Greater Bendigo, in the Loddon Mallee region, with Mia Mia, in the Shire of Mitchell, in the Hume region.

== History ==
Prior to construction of the bridge, a ford at the same location was used to assist passage. However, any significant rise in the river's flow would often delay safe transit of goods and people.

Built during 1867, the bridge was officially opened on 23 January 1868, despite a carved commemoration stone that stated that the date 1867. Previously known as the Mia Mia Bridge, the name of Redesdale Bridge was formally gazetted on 19 March 2015.

The trusses for the bridge were originally imported in 1859 for the Hawthorn Bridge over the Yarra River connecting the suburbs of Richmond and Hawthorn. The ship Herald of the Morning, at the end of its second voyage to Australia in 1859, whilst bringing 419 immigrants and a mixed cargo that included the wrought iron trusses, caught fire and sank in Hobsons Bay. As a result, the Hawthorn bridge was delayed for several years while new trusses were made and shipped out to Australia.

Ten years later the original trusses were salvaged from wreck of Herald of the Morning at the bottom of Hobsons Bay and sold privately to the Melbourne foundry Langlands & Co. The wreck was advertised for sale on 29 November 1859. one hundred and eighty tonnes (two hundred short tons) of ironwork were purchased by the goldfields shires of McIvor and Metcalfe for £1,000. Prominent Melbourne engineer T. B. Muntz designed the bridge and contractor Thomas Doran won the construction contract. The final cost of the bridge was £6,274.

== Description ==
Detail of the abutment and lattice truss, in summer 2011

The bridge was constructed with a divided-lane through-truss design, created specifically for the difficult river crossing and unique in Victoria. The trusses were originally intended for a deck truss design, but were adapted to allow their use as through trusses with stiffening arches connecting them above the roadway. Two separate roadways with an intervening stone pillar separating them have caused problems for modern traffic. The road deck is made with longitudinal timber planks on large timber cross girders that are supported on the lower chords of the trusses.

The Redesdale Bridge is the last road crossing of the Campaspe River before its confluence with the Coliban River to form Lake Eppalock.

=== Similar bridge ===
Whereas the huge lattice truss girders of the Redesdale Bridge were imported from England in 1859, the colonial engineering works had in the meantime developed to service reef and deep lead-mining and, by 1870, supplied such products for the Glenmona Bridge in Central Victoria.

== See also ==
- List of places on the Victorian Heritage Register in the City of Greater Bendigo
- List of places on the Victorian Heritage Register in the Shire of Mitchell
- List of road bridges in Victoria
