= Bert Boromeo =

Australian rules footballer

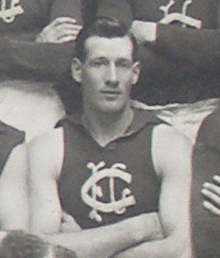
- Boromeo in 1921

Personal information
- Full name: Albert Boromeo
- Born: 10 May 1892; Timor, Victoria
- Died: 19 April 1971 (aged 78); Hawthorn, Victoria
- Original team: Bowenvale
- Height: 184 cm (6 ft 0 in)
- Weight: 89 kg (196 lb)

Playing career^{1}
Years	Club	Games (Goals)
1919–1923	Carlton	69 (24)
1926	Richmond	14 (8)
Total		83 (32)
- ^{1} Playing statistics correct to the end of 1923.

Albert Boromeo (10 May 1892 – 19 April 1971) was an Australian rules footballer who played for the Carlton Football Club and Richmond Football Club in the Victorian Football League (VFL).
