= Victoria Bridge, Melbourne =

Victoria Bridge
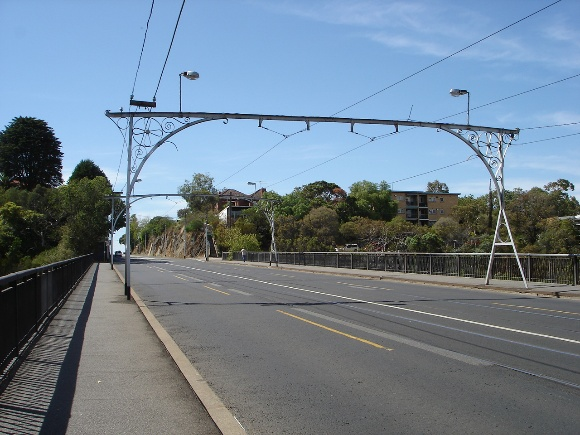
- Looking east, with overhead tram gantry, 2002
- Coordinates: 37°48′44″S 145°0′55″E
- Carries: Victoria Street: Road traffic; –; Pedestrians
- Crosses: Yarra River
- Locale: Melbourne, Victoria, Australia
- Begins: Richmond / Abbotsford (west)
- Ends: Hawthorn / Kew (east)
- Other name: Victoria Street Bridge
- Named for: Queen Victoria
- Preceded by: Walmer Street Footbridge
- Followed by: Hawthorn Bridge

Characteristics
- Design: Warren truss
- Material: Wrought iron
- Trough construction: Timber (1884-1933); Reinforced concrete (1933)

Rail characteristics
- No. of tracks: 2 (tram)
- Track gauge: 1,435 mm (4 ft 8.5 in) standard gauge
- Electrified: 1916

History
- Architect: William Charles Kernot
- Designer: Fraser & Chase
- Contracted lead designer: Charles Rowand
- Constructed by: Mr P. Platt
- Fabrication by: H. Wallace and Son (1914; gantries)
- Built: c. 1880–1884
- Construction cost: c.A£10,000
- Opened: 31 March 1884; 142 years ago
- Rebuilt: 1890, 1915, 1933

Victorian Heritage Register
- Official name: Victoria Bridge
- Type: Registered place
- Designated: 14 June 2007
- Reference no.: H0374
- Heritage overlay nos.: HO292, HO480
- Category: Transport – Road

Location
- Interactive map of Victoria Bridge

The Victoria Bridge is a Warren truss bridge over the Yarra River between Richmond and Hawthorn, Melbourne, Victoria, Australia. The bridge carries Victoria Street across the Yarra including vehicular traffic, Melbourne tram route 109, and pedestrians. The Main Yarra Trail passes underneath the western abutment of the bridge.

The bridge was added to the Victorian Heritage Register on 14 June 2007 in recognition of its historical, scientific (technical) and aesthetic significance.

== Description ==
Completed in 1884, the bridge is a riveted, wrought iron, Warren truss bridge. The bridge was widened in 1890—to accommodate the horse-drawn trolley cars—by extending the double-arched piers and abutments to triple arches and adding a further truss girder on the upstream side. Following electrification, in 1915 the bridge was further strengthened to accommodate the extra weight of electric trams and widened to accommodate two cantilever footpaths. Further widening and reconditioning of the bridge took place in 1933, including the addition of four new welded trusses and a reinforced concrete bridge platform.

The bridge initiated travel and trade between the industrial inner suburbs and the eastern suburbs of Melbourne and stands testimony to the development of the tramway in the city. It comprises two ornamental tramway overhead gantries which were installed in 1916. They hold an aesthetic significance because of their early 20th-century ornamental design.

== Gallery ==
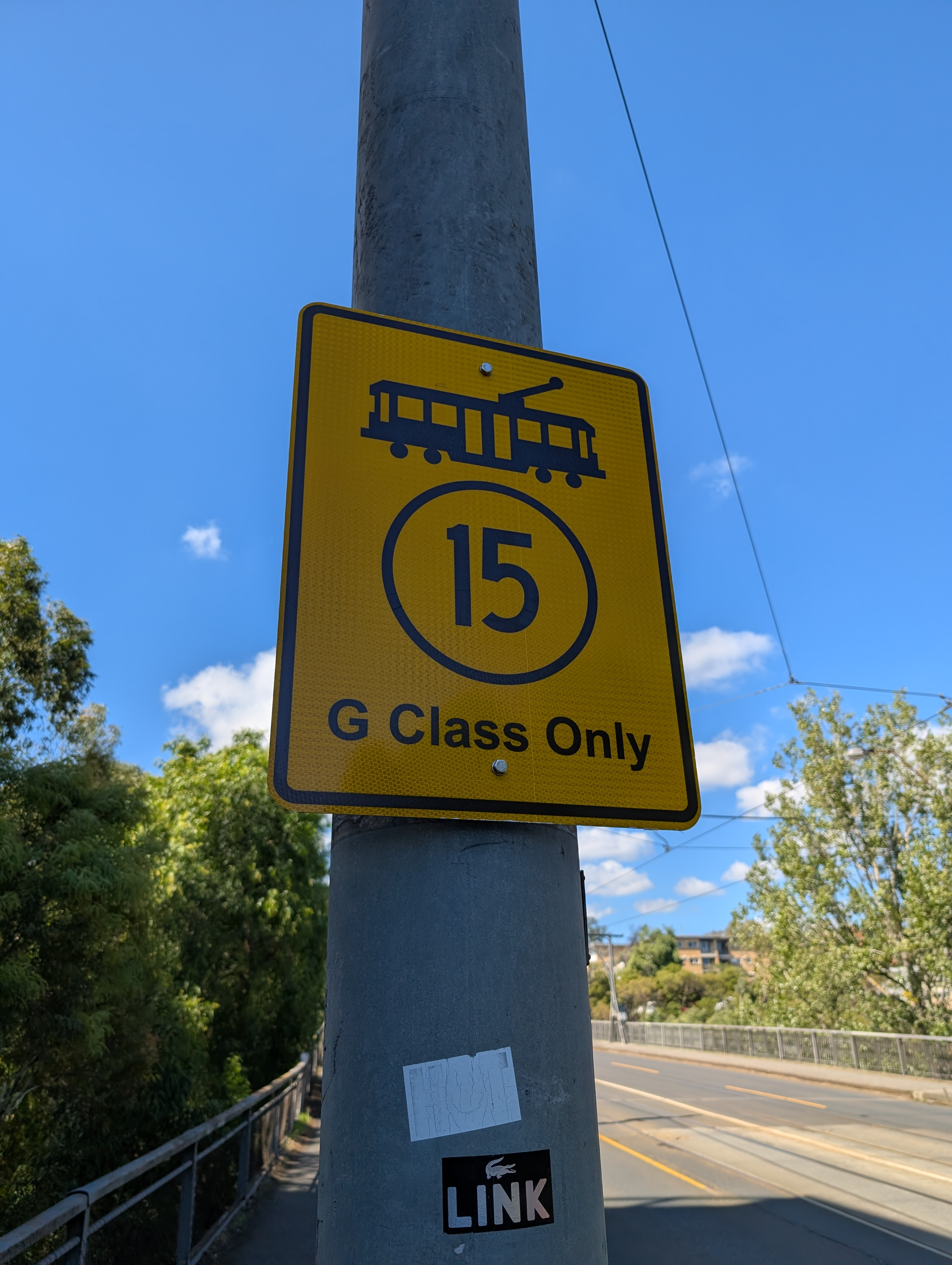
Speed limit sign for G-class trams on the bridge

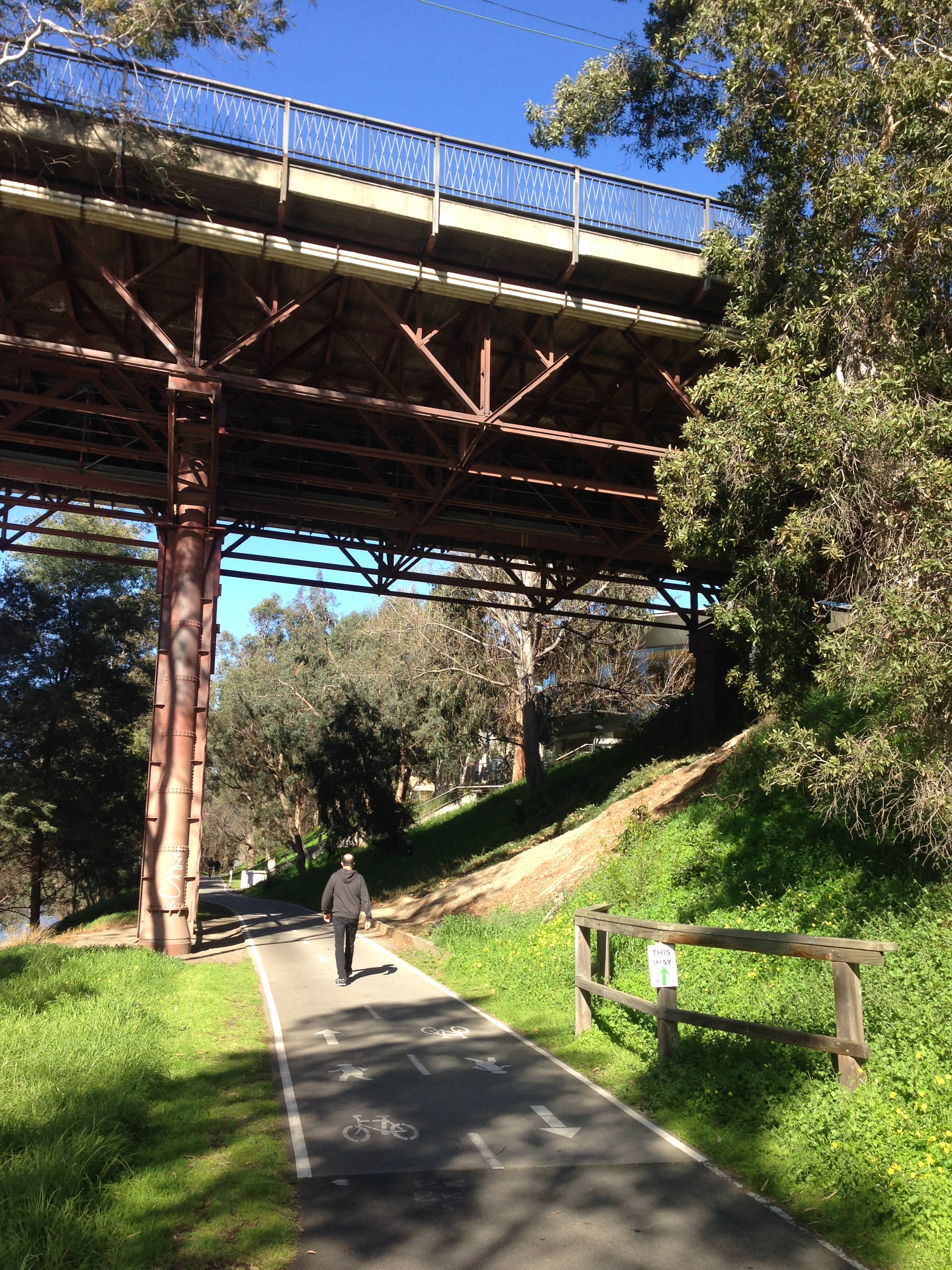
The Main Yarra / Capital City trails under the bridge's western abutment

== See also ==
- Crossings of the Yarra River
- List of places on the Victorian Heritage Register in the City of Boroondara

Next crossing upstream	Yarra River	Next crossing downstream
Walmer Street Footbridge (pedestrians; cyclists)	Victoria Bridge, Melbourne	Hawthorn Bridge (trams; vehicles; pedestrians; cyclists)
