= Barfold =

- Town
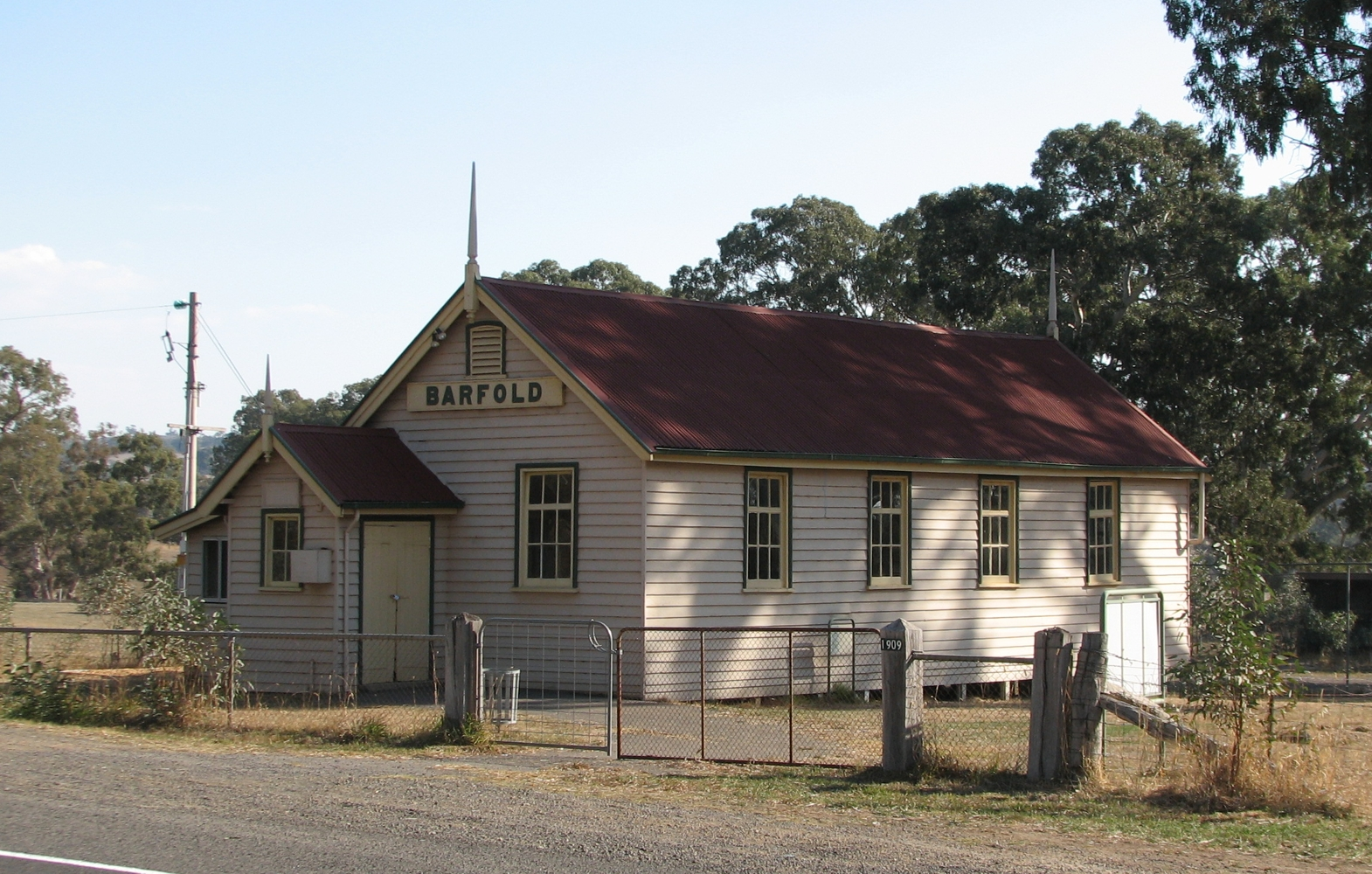
- Barfold Hall, 2008

- Coordinates: 37°05′S 144°30′E
- Country: Australia
- State: Victoria
- LGA: Shire of Mount Alexander
- Location: 104 km (65 mi) NW of Melbourne; 20 km (12 mi) NE of Kyneton; 15 km (9.3 mi) S of Redesdale

Population
  - Total: 88 (2016 census)
- Postcode: 3444

Barfold is a locality on the Heathcote-Kyneton Road (C326) in Victoria, Australia. It has a community hall, Barfold Hall, and an Anglican church, Barfold Union Church.

A significant geological feature in the area is the Barfold Gorge, a four-kilometre-long gorge which is up to 80 metres deep and has two waterfalls, basalt columns and a lava cave.

== History ==
For thousands of years, the Barfold area had been inhabited by the Djadjawurrung Aboriginal people.

In April 1837, the squatter, William Henry Yaldwyn, sent John Coppock and Edward Eyre from Yass to the Port Phillip District to find a suitable run (sheep and cattle pasture). They chose an area near the Campaspe River, about 65 miles (105 km) north of Melbourne.

Consequently, Yaldwyn arranged a lease of about 60,000 acres of grazing land from the government in Sydney, for an annual fee of ten pounds. He named the run Barfold, after Barfold-under-Beacon, in Sussex, England, which was part of his estate there.

Coppock drove 4000 sheep from the Goulburn area to set up the run. The occupation of their land by Europeans was resisted by the Djadjawurrung, who regularly scattered flocks of sheep and killed them for food. That often led to harsh reprisals from the white settlers.

In June 1838, two assigned convict shepherds were found dead and 1200 sheep were missing. Coppock assembled a group of about 20 men from Barfold and nearby properties. The armed and mounted party tracked the Djadjawurrung to their camp in a gully now known as Waterloo Plains. The posse carried out a surprise night attack on the Djadjawurrung camp. When it was over, between eight and 23 Djadjawurrung were dead and others wounded. Two of the attackers sustained minor injuries.

The Chief Protector of Aborigines in the Port Phillip District, George Augustus Robinson noted in his journal:

They fired from their horses; the blacks were down in the hole. They were out of distance of spears. One old man kept supplying them with spears and was soon shot. Great many were shot. Some other blacks held up pieces of bark to keep off the balls but it was no use. Some were shot dead with their bark in their hands.

in 1839, Yaldwyn sold Barfold to Thomas Thorneloe, the managing partner of a syndicate including John Montagu and Sir George Arthur, a former Lieutenant Governor of Van Diemen's Land. Yaldwyn Road in Kyneton is named after him.

A Barfold post office opened on 1 November 1861, some distance to the south of the present township. It was renamed Langley in 1867 when a new Barfold office was renamed from Emberton, which had been open a few months. It closed in 1957, as did Langley in 1970.

Barfold is the birthplace of William Watt, who served two terms as Premier of Victoria during 1912–14 before moving to federal politics. He was acting prime minister of Australia from April 1918 to August 1919, while Billy Hughes was in Europe, and Speaker of the Australian House of Representatives from 1923 to 1926.

The Barfold sign now mounted on the public hall was originally the station sign at Barfold railway station, which was on the Redesdale railway line. The station opened with the line in January 1891, and closed with the line in 1954.
