= William Yaldwyn =

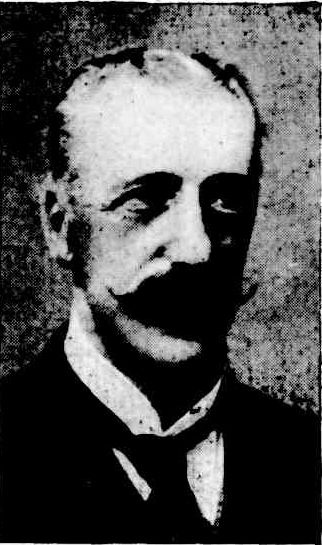
- William Yaldwyn, 1906

Member of the Queensland Legislative Council
- In office 10 June 1868 – 15 May 1877

Personal details
- Born: William Yaldwyn; 12 November 1836 Blackdown, Sussex, England
- Died: 27 July 1919 (aged 82) Sydney, Australia
- Spouse(s): Jane Sinclair (m.1861 d.1883), Violet Norm Jessie Agnew (m.1902)
- Relations: William Henry Yaldwyn (father)
- Occupation: Pastoralist

William Yaldwyn (12 November 1835 – 27 July 1919) was a politician in Queensland, Australia. He was a member of the Queensland Legislative Council.

== Early life ==
William Yaldwyn was born on 12 November 1835 at Blackdown House, Blackdown, Sussex, England in 1835 to William Henry Yaldwyn (1801–1866) and his wife Henrietta Mary (née Bowles,1805–1855). He was educated at Blackheath Preparatory School and Tonbridge Grammar School, Kent. His first journey to Australia was from Gravesend on "The William Glen Anderson" with his parents, William Henry and Henrietta, his sister Henrietta (1833–1918) and his Aunt Caroline Sarah Bowles (1814–1911). They returned to England in 1841 where William and Henrietta were sent to boarding schools. William known as "Willie" went to a boarding school in Brighton before going to a Preparatory school at Blackheath. After a couple more trips to Australia William (Junior) eventually settled in Queensland. His father William Henry purchased two sheep stations at Taroome in 1858 when "Willie" was only 23 years old. He followed in his fathers footsteps by being appointed a nominee of the Queensland Legislative Council and also Police Magistrate. He resigned in 1868 when he joined the public service. He held similar positions at Ipswich, South Brisbane and Brisbane before he retired in 1906. William Yaldwyn (Willie) was married twice. His first wife Jane Sinclair died after having their ninth child in 1883. together they had five sons and three daughters and one son having died as an infant. He married his second wife on 24 June 1902 to Violet Norma Agnew (1881–1962). William Yaldwyn died in Sydney on 27 July 1919 and had no surviving male children.

Upon his arrival in Queensland he gained Pastoral experience by working on his father's stations.

== Politics ==
On 18 June 1868 he was appointed to the Queensland Legislative Council serving for nine years before resigning to become a Police Magistrate in Dalby on 15 May 1877.

== Later life ==
Yaldwyn was promoted to Police Magistrate in Ipswich where he served for eleven years and was promoted as Police Magistrate in South Brisbane where he remained until his retirement in 1906 after 29 years of service as a police magistrate.

Yaldwyn had a keen interest in sport, promoting the first rugby football club in Warwick and representing the Queensland I Zingari cricket team in 1875/76. In 1861 he had married Jane Sinclair and together they had seven children. Jane died in 1883 and in 1902 he married Violet Norm Jessie Agnew, the daughter of Phil Agnew, the Post and Telegraph Master of Dunwich. He retired to England in 1907 but later returned to Brisbane and died in a private hospital in Sydney on 27 July 1919.
