= Bealiba railway station =

Former railway station in Australia

Coordinates: 36°47′24.0″S 143°33′11.9″E

Bealiba
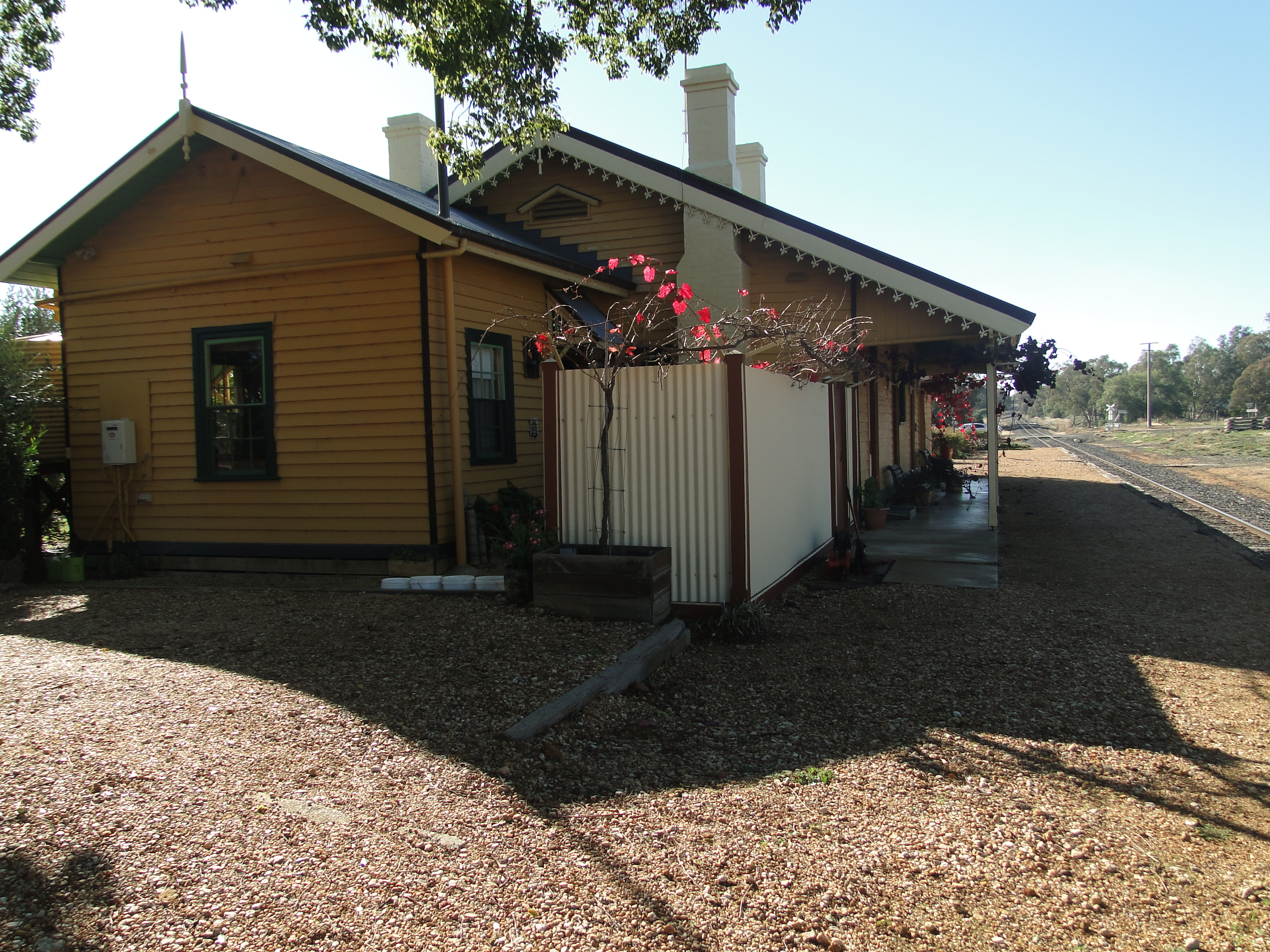

General information
- Location: Grant Street, Bealiba VIC 3475; Australia
- Owner: VicTrack
- Line: Yelta

Other information
- Status: preserved

History
- Opened: 1878
- Closed: 1981

Services
Preceding station	Disused railways	Following station
Goldsborough, Victoria	Yelta line	Emu
	List of closed railway stations in Victoria	
Location

Bealiba railway station was a railway station on the Yelta railway line. It was opened in 1878 when the railway line was extended to St Arnaud and closed in 1981 under the New Deal reorganisation. By 1968, the stationmaster had been removed. The station has been very well preserved and is now leased out as a private residence.
