= Albert Lauder =

Australian rules footballer

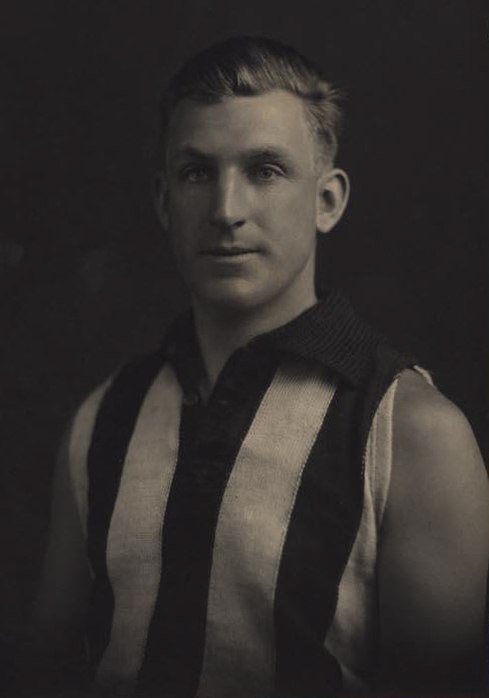
- Lauder during his career with Collingwood

Personal information
- Full name: Albert Victor Lauder
- Born: 11 October 1898; Timor, Victoria
- Died: 4 September 1971 (aged 72); Heidelberg, Victoria
- Original team: Public Service
- Height: 178 cm (5 ft 10 in)
- Weight: 79 kg (174 lb)

Playing career^{1}
Years	Club	Games (Goals)
1926–1931	Collingwood	36 (0)
- ^{1} Playing statistics correct to the end of 1931.

Albert Victor Lauder (11 October 1898 – 4 September 1971) was an Australian rules footballer who played with Collingwood in the Victorian Football League (VFL).

Lauder was at Collingwood during a prolific period for the club, and despite playing only 36 league games he played in three premiership sides. He always played as a defender, on either a half-back flank or back pocket and initially struggled to cement a spot in the side with only five games in his first three seasons. Lauder finished in a losing team on only four occasions during his career.

Lauder holds the League record for the most consecutive games won at the start of a career, with 18. His first loss came in the 1929 semi-final against Richmond; however, Collingwood went on to defeat Richmond in the 1929 VFL Grand Final.

Lauder finished his VFL senior playing career with a record of 32–0–4, representing a winning percentage of 88.89%.
