= Redesdale, Victoria =

Redesdale
- Suburb
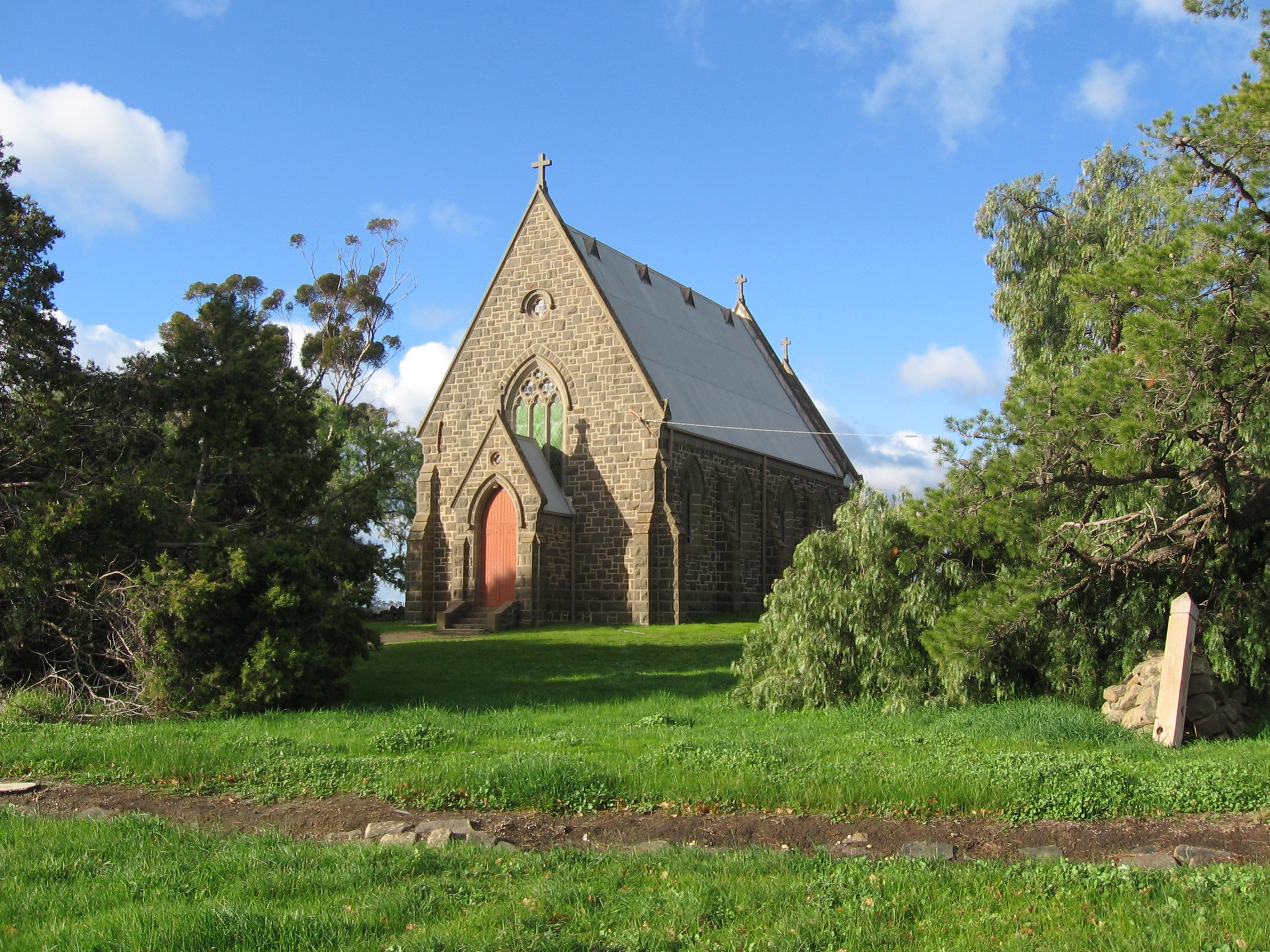
- Catholic Church at Redesdale, 2007

- Interactive map of Redesdale
- Coordinates: 37°01′0″S 144°31′0″E
- Country: Australia
- State: Victoria
- City: Bendigo
- LGAs: City of Greater Bendigo; Shire of Mount Alexander
- Location: 115 km (71 mi) NW of Melbourne; 44 km (27 mi) SE of Bendigo; 30 km (19 mi) N of Kyneton; 25 km (16 mi) SW of Heathcote

Government
  - State electorates: Euroa; Macedon
  - Federal division: Bendigo
- Elevation: 290 m (950 ft)

Population
  - Total: 299 (2021 census)
- Postcode: 3444
- Mean max temp: 20.0 °C (68.0 °F)
- Mean min temp: 7.2 °C (45.0 °F)
- Annual rainfall: 570.2 mm (22.45 in)

Redesdale /ˈriːdsdeɪl/ is a town in the City of Greater Bendigo and the Shire of Mount Alexander, Victoria, Australia. At the 2021 census, Redesdale had a population of 299.

== History ==
There are conflicting accounts about the origin of Redesdale's name. According to Thomas O'Callaghan's 1918 book Names of Victorian Railways Stations, Redesdale is named after Lord Redesdale. However, according to the website Victorian Places, Redesdale is named after Robert William Rede. The Redesdale post office opened on 22 March 1865.

=== Heritage listing ===
The following place in Redesdale is listed on the Victorian Heritage Register:

- Redesdale Bridge, Heathcote–Redesdale Road, built in 1867 and known as the Mia Mia Bridge until 2015

== Redesdale bridge ==
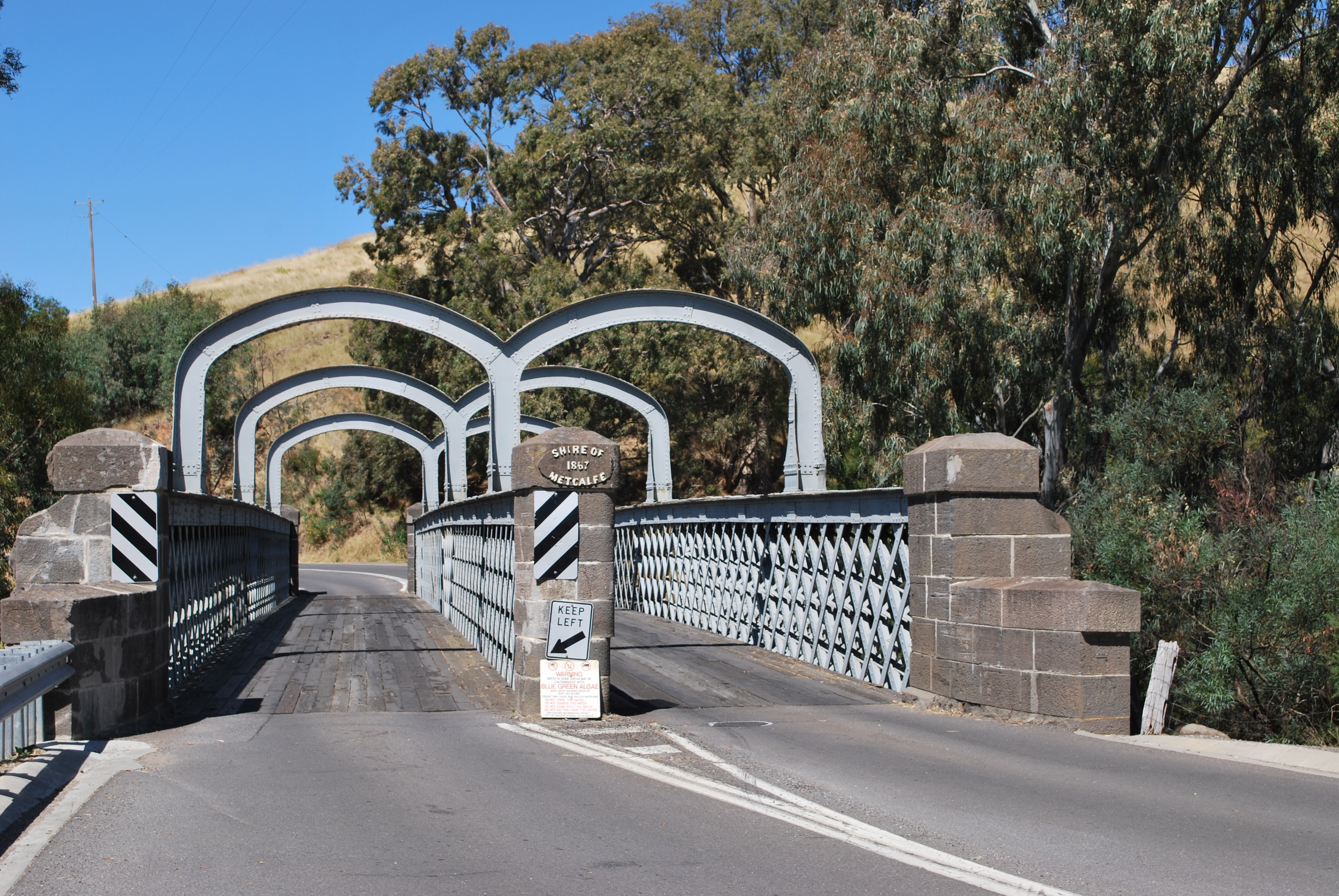
The unique Redesdale bridge, 2011

Redesdale is on the opposite bank of the Campaspe River to the town of Mia Mia. The towns are connected by the heritage listed Redesdale bridge, one of the oldest iron lattice-truss bridges in Victoria. The trusses were originally imported in 1859 for a bridge crossing the Yarra River in suburban Hawthorn. The ship bringing the trusses to Melbourne, the Herald of the Morning, caught fire and was towed to the shore in Hobsons Bay, becoming a total wreck. As a result, the building of Hawthorn Bridge, connecting Richmond and Hawthorn, was delayed for a couple of years while new trusses shipped out to Australia.

The original trusses were salvaged from the wreck of Herald of the Morning, but had been damaged by the fire. Almost a decade later, they were used for the Redesdale-Mia Mia Bridge. It was constructed on site in 1868 with a divided-lane through-truss design, created specifically for the difficult river crossing and unique in Victoria.

== Railway ==
Redesdale was once the terminus of a branch line railway which connected with the Melbourne – Murray River Railway at Redesdale Junction, between Kyneton and Malmsbury. Other stations along the branch were Edgecombe, Green Hill, East Metcalfe, Emberton and Barfold. The Redesdale line was opened on 15 January 1891 and closed on 29 June 1954. The tracks and stations have since been removed.

== Other ==
Redesdale has a primary school, a petrol station/general store, a hall, an historic bluestone pub/tavern and a recreation reserve.

One of Australia's worst aircraft disasters, the 1945 Australian National Airways Stinson crash, in which 10 people were killed, occurred 2 miles (3.2 km) east of town.

== Climate ==
Climate data for Redesdale (1991–2020)
Month	Jan	Feb	Mar	Apr	May	Jun	Jul	Aug	Sep	Oct	Nov	Dec	Year
Record high °C (°F)	46.1 (115.0)	45.0 (113.0)	38.7 (101.7)	33.7 (92.7)	25.9 (78.6)	20.1 (68.2)	18.5 (65.3)	21.1 (70.0)	29.1 (84.4)	35.0 (95.0)	41.1 (106.0)	44.5 (112.1)	46.1 (115.0)
Mean daily maximum °C (°F)	29.8 (85.6)	29.1 (84.4)	25.7 (78.3)	20.8 (69.4)	16.1 (61.0)	13.0 (55.4)	12.1 (53.8)	13.6 (56.5)	16.4 (61.5)	19.9 (67.8)	24.0 (75.2)	27.1 (80.8)	20.6 (69.1)
Daily mean °C (°F)	21.5 (70.7)	21.2 (70.2)	18.2 (64.8)	14.1 (57.4)	10.6 (51.1)	8.3 (46.9)	7.5 (45.5)	8.3 (46.9)	10.3 (50.5)	12.8 (55.0)	16.3 (61.3)	18.7 (65.7)	14.0 (57.2)
Mean daily minimum °C (°F)	13.2 (55.8)	13.3 (55.9)	10.8 (51.4)	7.4 (45.3)	5.2 (41.4)	3.7 (38.7)	3.0 (37.4)	3.0 (37.4)	4.1 (39.4)	5.7 (42.3)	8.7 (47.7)	10.3 (50.5)	7.4 (45.3)
Record low °C (°F)	1.7 (35.1)	2.6 (36.7)	1.4 (34.5)	−1.1 (30.0)	−2.2 (28.0)	−3.8 (25.2)	−5.6 (21.9)	−4.4 (24.1)	−4.2 (24.4)	−3.3 (26.1)	−3.0 (26.6)	−0.2 (31.6)	−5.6 (21.9)
Average precipitation mm (inches)	35.5 (1.40)	32.7 (1.29)	33.4 (1.31)	39.4 (1.55)	50.7 (2.00)	60.0 (2.36)	56.5 (2.22)	55.9 (2.20)	49.5 (1.95)	41.9 (1.65)	50.3 (1.98)	38.1 (1.50)	543.0 (21.38)
Average precipitation days (≥ 1 mm)	3.9	3.1	4.0	4.6	6.6	8.4	10.1	9.7	7.9	6.5	5.7	4.7	75.2
Average dew point °C (°F)	9.1 (48.4)	9.9 (49.8)	8.6 (47.5)	6.9 (44.4)	6.3 (43.3)	5.3 (41.5)	4.7 (40.5)	4.5 (40.1)	5.2 (41.4)	6.0 (42.8)	7.5 (45.5)	7.6 (45.7)	6.8 (44.2)
Source: National Oceanic and Atmospheric Administration
