= Redesdale railway station =

Former railway station in Victoria, Australia

Redesdale

General information
- Location: Redesdale, Victoria; Australia
- Coordinates: 37°01′25″S 144°31′46″E
- Operator: Victorian Railways
- Line: Redesdale
- Platforms: 1

Other information
- Status: Closed

History
- Opened: 15 January 1891
- Closed: 29 June 1954
Location

Redesdale railway station was the terminus of the Redesdale line. There were sheep yards at the station and a number of mills where firewood was cut and sent to Melbourne. Cream was often sent by rail to the Newstead Butter Factory.

== History ==
It was mostly a goods station but serviced passengers by means of mixed-goods trains and railmotors.

In 1920, Redesdale station saw 1,721 outgoing passengers, but this figure fell sharply over the next decade for the dissemination of private vehicles and decreasing population in the area.

In 1930, only 41 passengers were carried. Demand decreased further following World War II, and the line closed on 29 June 1954.

On 3 November 1949, the railway turntable at the station snapped under the weight of the locomotive that was halfway through turning on it. The incident could be heard nearly a mile away.
