= City of Castlemaine =

Coordinates: 37°04′S 144°13′E

- Local government area
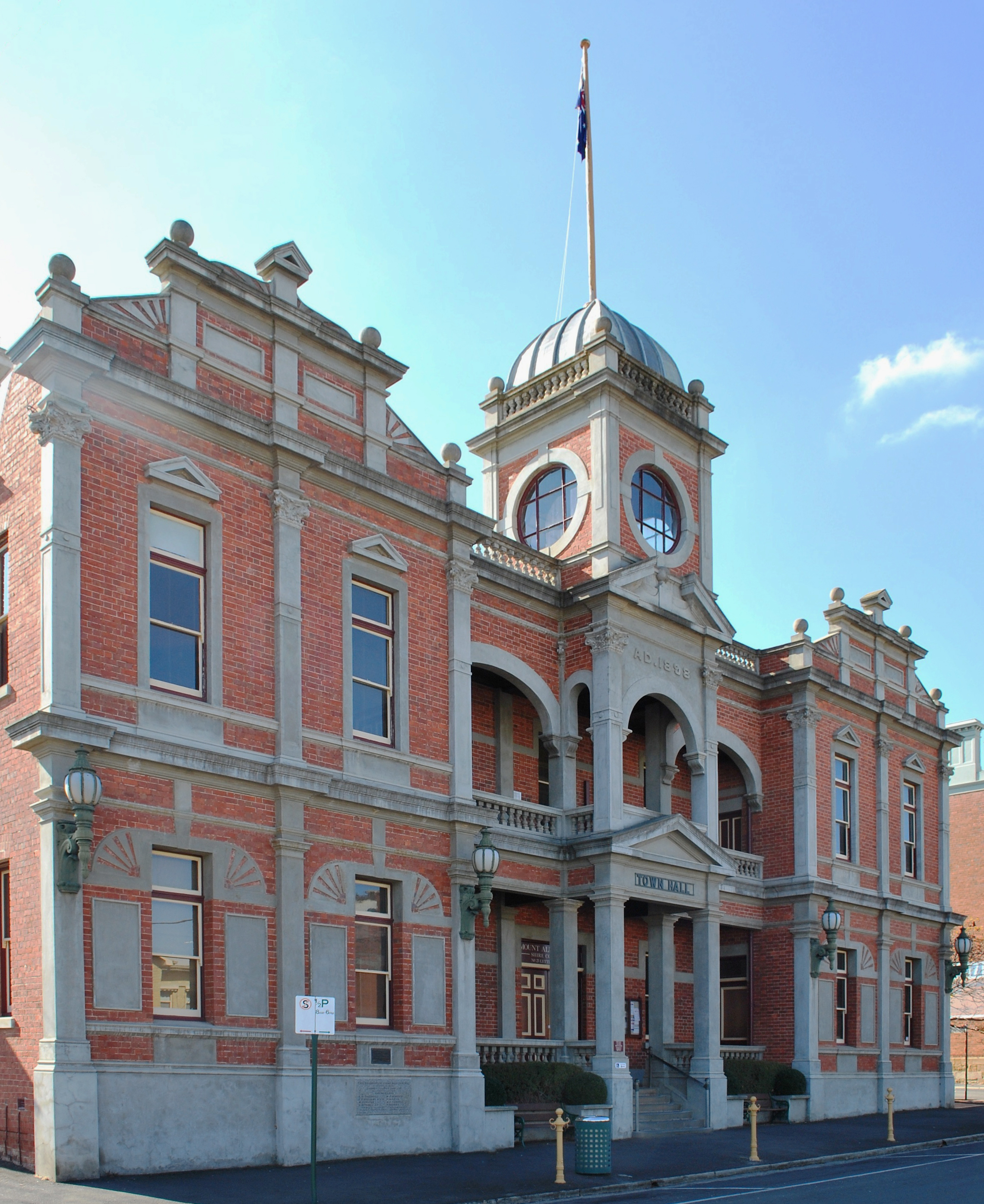
- Town Hall

- The extent of the City of Castlemaine
- Country: Australia
- State: Victoria
- Region: North Central Victoria
- Established: 1855
- Council seat: Castlemaine

Area
  - Total: 23.31 km^{2} (9.00 sq mi)

Population
  - Total(s): 7,310 (1992)
  - Density: 313.60/km^{2} (812.2/sq mi)
- County: Talbot
LGAs around City of Castlemaine
Maldon	Maldon	Metcalfe
Maldon	City of Castlemaine	Metcalfe
Newstead	Newstead	Newstead

The City of Castlemaine was a local government area about 120 kilometres (75 mi) north-northwest of Melbourne, the state capital of Victoria, Australia, and 38 kilometres (24 mi) south of the regional city of Bendigo. The city covered an area of 23.31 square kilometres (9.0 sq mi), and existed from 1855 until 1995.

== History ==
Castlemaine was first incorporated as a municipal district on 23 April 1855. It became a borough on 1 October 1863, a town on 30 January 1950, and was proclaimed a city on 4 December 1965.

On 20 January 1995, the City of Castlemaine was abolished, and along with the Shires of Maldon, Metcalfe and Newstead, was merged into the newly created Shire of Mount Alexander.

=== Wards ===
The City of Castlemaine was not divided into wards, and its nine councillors represented the entire city.

== Population ==
Year	Population
1954	6,577
1958	7,020*
1961	7,216
1966	7,082
1971	6,915
1976	6,675
1981	6,564
1986	6,603
1991	6,812

* Estimate in the 1958 Victorian Year Book.
