= Barfold Gorge =

Gorge in Victoria, Australia

Coordinates: 37°4′21″S 144°32′17″E

Barfold Gorge is a four-kilometre long gorge on the Campaspe River at Barfold in Victoria in Australia. It is up to 80 metres deep and has two waterfalls, basalt columns and a lava cave. It was created by a sequence of four or more lava flows which commenced six million years ago. The gorge is on private property, a 246 hectare sheep and cattle farm and is rarely open to the public. However, a conservation covenant has been incorporated in the land title.

There are 95 bird species recorded for the gorge environs including peregrine falcons. Other flora and fauna include platypus, rare fish and the hairy anchor plant (Discaria pubescens), a rare and endangered plant species.
