= Shire of Metcalfe =

Coordinates: 37°06′S 144°25′E

- Local government area
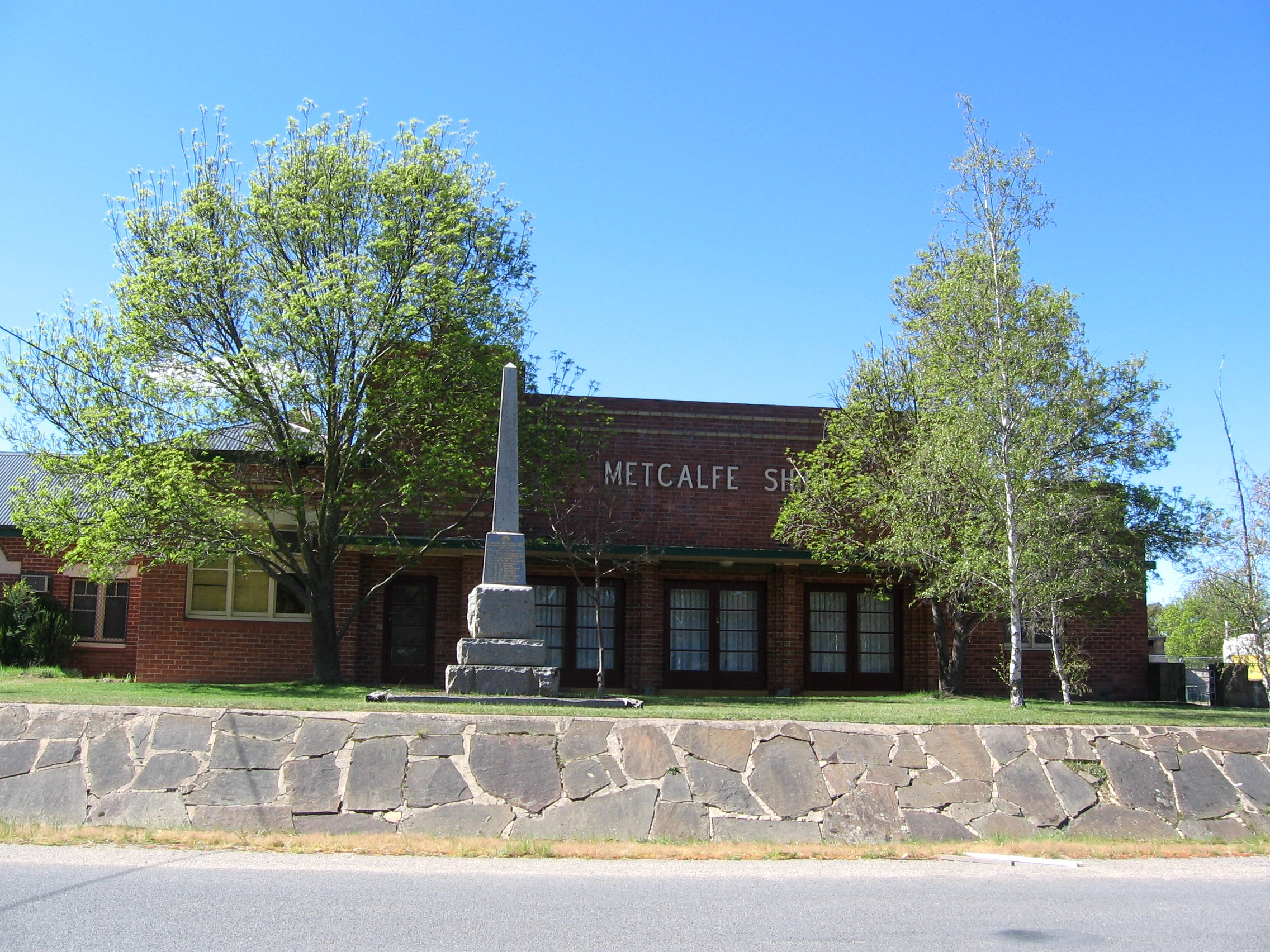
- The former Shire Hall and Council Chambers in Metcalfe

- The Shire of Metcalfe as at its dissolution in 1995
- Country: Australia
- State: Victoria
- Region: North Central Victoria
- Established: 1860
- Council seat: Metcalfe

Area
  - Total: 590.52 km^{2} (228.00 sq mi)

Population
  - Total(s): 3,390 (1992)
  - Density: 5.741/km^{2} (14.868/sq mi)
- County: Dalhousie, Talbot
LGAs around Shire of Metcalfe
Maldon	Strathfieldsaye	McIvor
Castlemaine (C)	Shire of Metcalfe	McIvor
Newstead	Daylesford and Glenlyon	Kyneton

The Shire of Metcalfe was a local government area about 105 kilometres (65 mi) north-northwest of Melbourne, the state capital of Victoria, Australia, and 45 kilometres (28 mi) south of the regional city of Bendigo. The shire covered an area of 590.52 square kilometres (228.0 sq mi), and existed from 1860 until 1995.

== History ==
Metcalfe was incorporated as a road district on 14 August 1860, and became a shire on 18 July 1865.

Metcalfe absorbed two boroughs which had previously been separately governed; On 7 October 1870, the Taradale Borough was united, while the Chewton Borough, created on 14 December 1860 with an area of 23.31 square kilometres (9.00 sq mi), was united on 2 May 1916.

On 20 January 1995, the Shire of Metcalfe was abolished, and along with the City of Castlemaine and the Shires of Maldon and Newstead, was merged into the newly created Shire of Mount Alexander. The town of Redesdale and the area surrounding Lake Eppalock were transferred into the City of Greater Bendigo.

== Wards ==
The Shire of Metcalfe was divided into four ridings, each of which elected three councillors:

- Chewton Riding
- Harcourt Riding
- Taradale Riding
- East Riding

== Towns and localities ==
- Barfold
- Barkers Creek
- Chewton
- Elphinstone
- Faraday
- Golden Point
- Harcourt
- Harcourt North
- Langley
- Metcalfe*
- Myrtle Creek
- Redesdale
- Sutton Grange
- Taradale

* Council seat.

== Population ==
Year	Population
1954	2,425
1958	2,560*
1961	2,316
1966	2,163
1971	1,983
1976	2,041
1981	2,173
1986	2,665
1991	3,125

* Estimate in the 1958 Victorian Year Book.

== Gallery ==
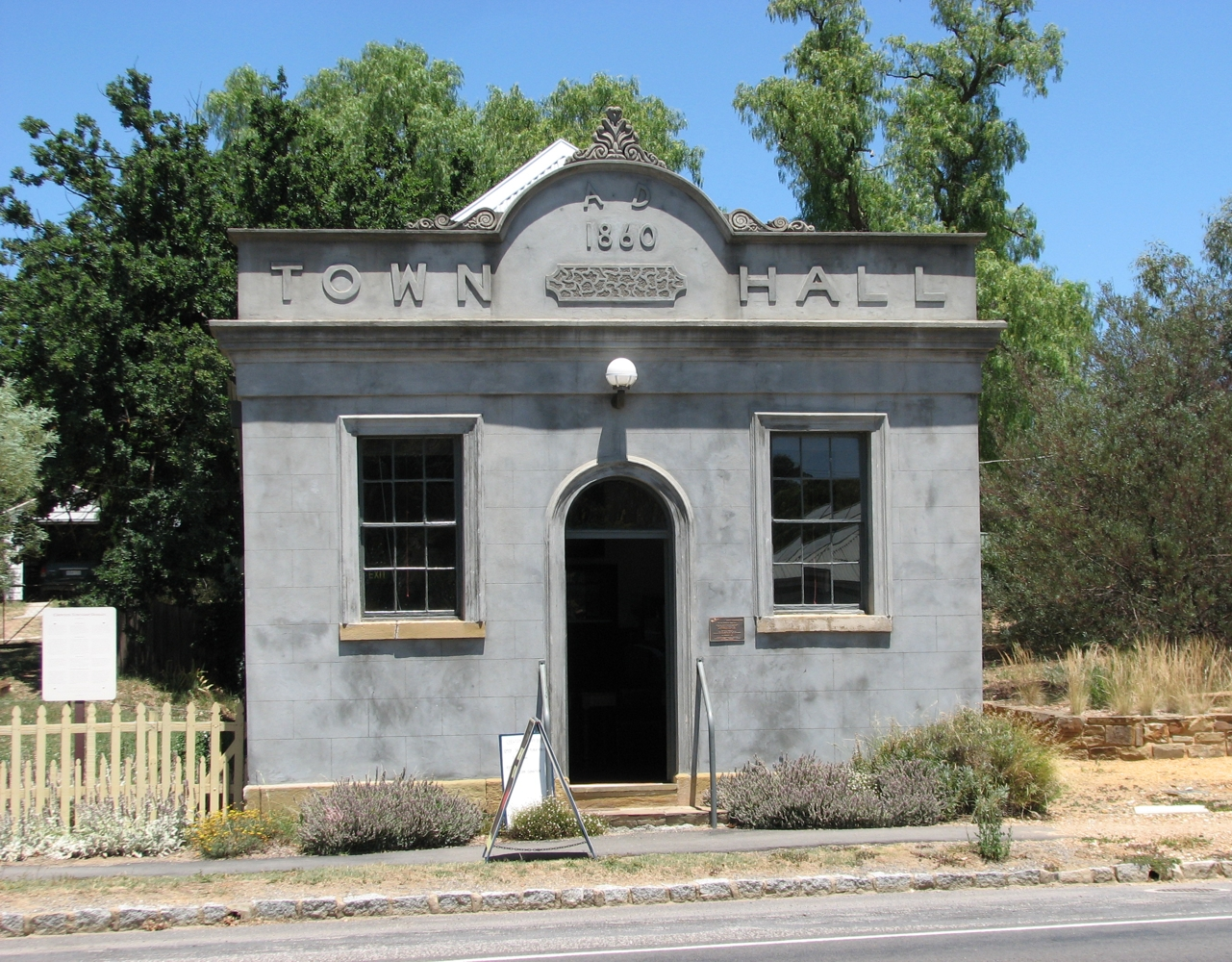
Chewton Town Hall, which was built by the Borough of Chewton in 1861.
