= Shire of Maldon =

Coordinates: 37°00′S 144°04′E

Shire of Maldon Victoria
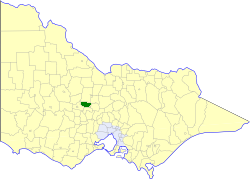
- Location in Victoria
- The Shire of Maldon as at its dissolution in 1995
- Population: 3,100 (1992)
  - Density: 5.65/km^{2} (14.62/sq mi)
- Established: 1858
- Area: 549 km^{2} (212.0 sq mi)
- Council seat: Maldon
- Region: North Central Victoria
- County: Talbot
LGAs around Shire of Maldon:
Bet Bet	Marong	Strathfieldsaye
Tullaroop	Shire of Maldon	Metcalfe
Tullaroop	Newstead	Castlemaine (C)

The Shire of Maldon was a local government area about 140 kilometres (87 mi) northwest of Melbourne, the state capital of Victoria, Australia, and 35 kilometres (22 mi) southwest of the regional city of Bendigo. The shire covered an area of 549 square kilometres (212.0 sq mi), and existed from 1858 until 1995.

== History ==
Maldon was first incorporated as a municipality on 6 August 1858, then as a road district on 2 September 1863. It was proclaimed a shire on 12 January 1864.

On 20 January 1995, the Shire of Maldon was abolished, and along with the City of Castlemaine and the Shires of Metcalfe and Newstead, was merged into the newly created Shire of Mount Alexander.

== Wards ==
The Shire of Maldon was divided into three ridings on 1 April 1988, each of which elected three councillors:

- Gowar Riding
- Nuggetty Riding
- Tarrengower Riding

== Towns and localities ==
- Baringhup
- Cairn Curran
- Gowar
- Maldon*
- Muckleford
- Neereman
- Nuggetty
- Porcupine Flat
- Tarrengower
- Walmer
- Woodbrook

* Council seat.

== Population ==
Year	Population
1954	2,030
1958	2,040*
1961	2,008
1966	1,953
1971	1,759
1976	1,864
1981	2,221
1986	2,563
1991	2,968

* Estimate in the 1958 Victorian Year Book.
