= Shire of Tullaroop =

Coordinates: 37°03′S 143°44′E

Shire of Tullaroop Victoria
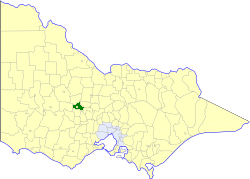
- Location in Victoria
- The Shire of Tullaroop as at its dissolution in 1995
- Population: 2,780 (1992)
  - Density: 4.360/km^{2} (11.292/sq mi)
- Established: 1861
- Area: 637.63 km^{2} (246.2 sq mi)
- Council seat: Maryborough
- Region: North Central Victoria
- County: Talbot, Gladstone
LGAs around Shire of Tullaroop:
Bet Bet	Bet Bet	Maldon
Avoca	Shire of Tullaroop	Newstead
Avoca	Talbot and Clunes	Newstead

The Shire of Tullaroop was a local government area about 170 kilometres (106 mi) northwest of Melbourne, the state capital of Victoria, Australia, surrounding the regional centre of Maryborough. The shire covered an area of 637.63 square kilometres (246.2 sq mi), and existed from 1861 until 1995. Maryborough itself was managed by a separate entity, ultimately known as the City of Maryborough. After a large-scale statewide amalgamation program by the Victorian Government in 1994, they were united under the Shire of Central Goldfields.

== History ==
Tullaroop was incorporated as a road district on 18 January 1861, and became a shire on 24 January 1865.

On 1 October 1915, two boroughs were united with Tullaroop; Carisbrook Borough, established on 7 August 1857, with an area of 21.83 square kilometres (8.43 sq mi), and Majorca Borough, established on 28 December 1864, with an area of 20.25 square kilometres (7.82 sq mi). Majorca Borough was originally known as Craigie Borough until 1876.

On 20 January 1995, the Shire of Tullaroop was abolished, and along with the City of Maryborough and parts of the Shire of Bet Bet and surrounding districts, was merged into the newly created Shire of Central Goldfields. The Laanecoorie Reservoir was merged into the newly created Shire of Loddon.

== Ridings ==
The Shire of Tullaroop was divided into four ridings, each of which elected three councillors:

- Carisbrook Riding
- Charlotte Plains Riding
- Norwood Riding
- Rodborough Riding

== Towns and localities ==
- Adelaide Lead
- Alma
- Bowenvale
- Carisbrook
- Craigie
- Eddington
- Havelock
- Majorca
- Moores Flat
- Moolort
- Moonlight Flat
- Rodborough
- Simson
- Wareek

== Population ==
Year	Population
1954	1,416
1958	1,460*
1961	1,376
1966	1,277
1971	1,193
1976	1,338
1981	1,647
1986	2,092
1991	2,643

* Estimate in the 1958 Victorian Year Book.
