= Shire of Newstead =

Coordinates: 37°06′S 144°04′E

Shire of Newstead Victoria
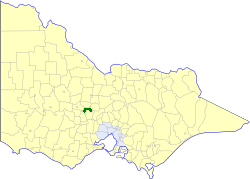
- Location in Victoria
- The Shire of Newstead as at its dissolution in 1995
- Population: 3,070 (1992)
  - Density: 7.502/km^{2} (19.43/sq mi)
- Established: 1860
- Area: 409.22 km^{2} (158.0 sq mi)
- Council seat: Newstead
- Region: North Central Victoria
- County: Talbot
LGAs around Shire of Newstead:
Tullaroop	Maldon	Metcalfe
Tullaroop	Shire of Newstead	Metcalfe
Creswick	Daylesford and Glenlyon	Daylesford and Glenlyon

The Shire of Newstead was a local government area about 120 kilometres (75 mi) northwest of Melbourne, the state capital of Victoria, Australia. The shire covered an area of 409.22 square kilometres (158.0 sq mi), and existed from 1860 until 1995.

== History ==
Newstead was first incorporated as a road district on 12 October 1860, and became a shire on 7 March 1865. On 1 October 1915, the Shire of Mount Alexander, created on 20 June 1871 with an area of 135 square kilometres (52 sq mi), was merged into Newstead.

On 20 January 1995, the Shire of Newstead was abolished, and along with the City of Castlemaine and the Shires of Maldon and Metcalfe, was merged into the newly created Shire of Mount Alexander.

== Wards ==
The Shire of Newstead was divided into four ridings, each of which elected three councillors:

- Campbells Creek Riding
- Fryers Riding
- Loddon Riding
- South Riding

== Towns and localities ==
- Cairn Curran Reservoir
- Campbells Creek
- Campbelltown
- Fryerstown
- Glenluce
- Guildford
- Muckleford South
- Newstead*
- Sandon
- Strangways
- Strathlea
- Tarilta
- Vaughan
- Welshmans Reef
- Werona
- Yandoit Hills
- Yapeen

* Council seat.

== Population ==
Year	Population
1954	2,088
1958	2,150*
1961	1,874
1966	1,772
1971	1,622
1976	1,719
1981	1,954
1986	2,303
1991	2,821

* Estimate in the 1958 Victorian Year Book.
