= City of Maryborough (Victoria) =

Coordinates: 37°03′S 143°44′E

- Local government area
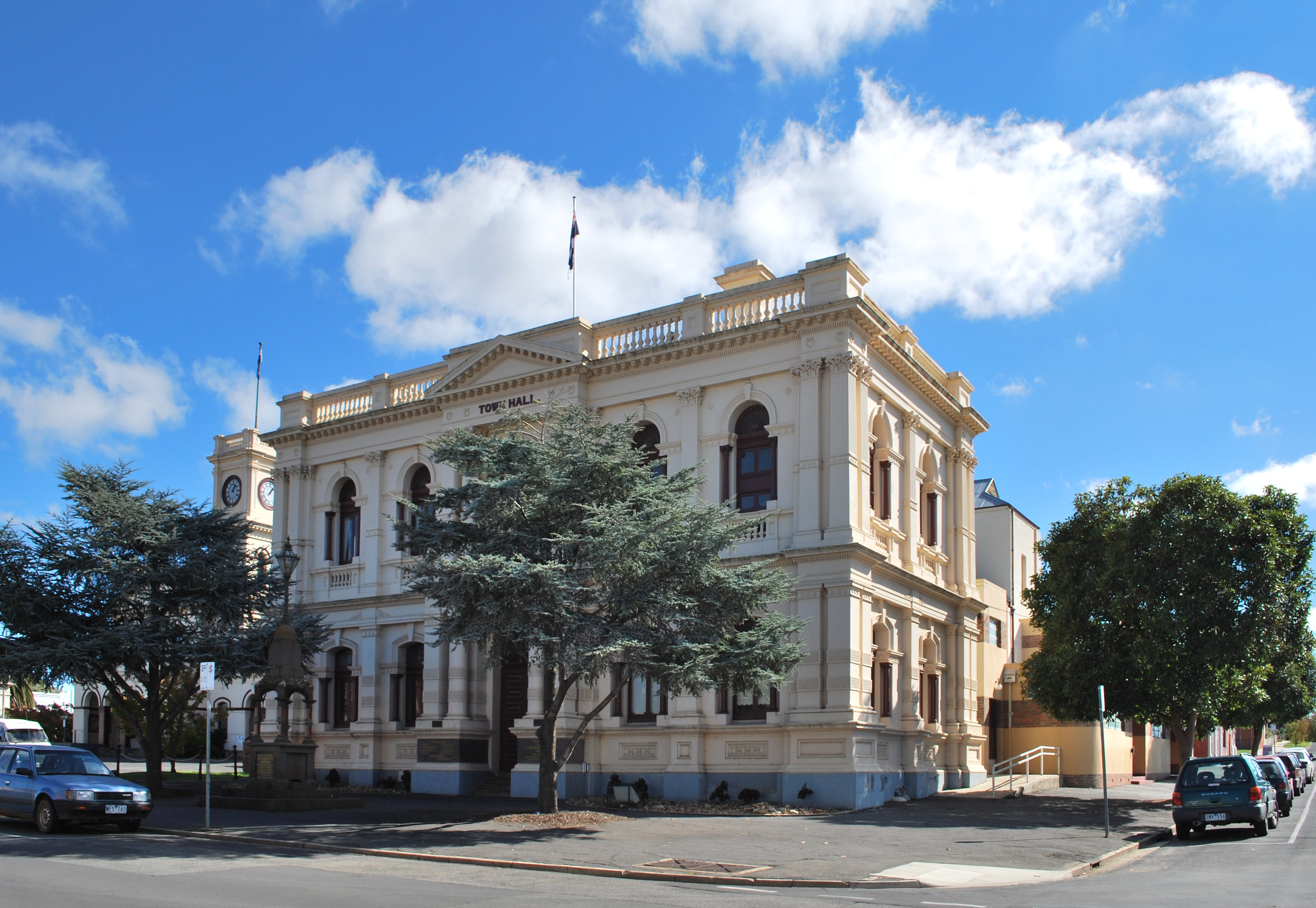
- Maryborough Town Hall
- The City of Maryborough as at its dissolution in 1994
- Country: Australia
- State: Victoria
- Region: North Central Victoria
- Established: 1857
- Council seat: Maryborough

Area
  - Total: 23.32 km^{2} (9.00 sq mi)

Population
  - Total(s): 7,990 (1992)
  - Density: 342.62/km^{2} (887.4/sq mi)
- County: Talbot

The City of Maryborough was a local government area about 170 kilometres (106 mi) northwest of Melbourne, the state capital of Victoria, Australia, and the governing body for the regional centre of Maryborough. The city covered an area of 23.32 square kilometres (9.0 sq mi), and existed from 1857 until 1995.

The City of Maryborough was surrounded by the Shire of Tullaroop, which was united with Maryborough under the Shire of Central Goldfields, as part of a large-scale statewide amalgamation program by the Victorian Government in 1994–95.

== History ==
Maryborough was first incorporated as a borough on 31 March 1857, and became a city on 31 March 1961.

On 20 January 1995, the City of Maryborough was abolished, and along with the Shires of Bet Bet, Tullaroop and surrounding districts, was merged into the newly created Shire of Central Goldfields.

== Geography ==
The City of Maryborough was defined geometrically. It was a perfect square of 240 by 240 chains (4.83 km × 4.83 km), offset 45 degrees from magnetic north, centred on the town's railway station.

== Wards ==
The City of Maryborough was divided into three wards in 1887, each of which elected three councillors:

- North Ward
- South Ward
- East Ward

== Population ==
| Year | Population |
|---|---|
| 1954 | 6,827 |
| 1958 | 7,300* |
| 1961 | 7,235 |
| 1966 | 7,694 |
| 1971 | 7,472 |
| 1976 | 7,569 |
| 1981 | 7,858 |
| 1986 | 7,705 |
| 1991 | 7,623 |

* Estimate in the 1958 Victorian Year Book.
