= Redesdale railway line =

Railway line in Australia

Redesdale

Overview
- Status: Closed
- Connecting lines: Melbourne - Murray River line at Redesdale Junction
- Stations: 7

Service
- Type: Branch line

History
- Opened: 15 January 1891
- Closed: 26 September 1954

Technical
- Number of tracks: Single track

The Redesdale railway line was a branch railway line off the Melbourne–Murray River line in Australia. The line was included in the Railway Construction Act 1884, which was known as the "Octopus Act" due to the number or railways it authorised.

The line never paid. It had seven stations, including its junction with Melbourne - Murray River Railway at Redesdale Junction. The other stations were Edgecombe, Green Hill, East Metcalfe, Emberton, Barfold and Redesdale.

Little survives of the line but, in 1932, a railway residence at East Metcalfe was purchased and moved to nearby Metcalfe, where it was named "Hollywood" and is still used as a family home.
