= Herald of the Morning =

History

Canada
- Name: Herald of the Morning
- Owner: George King and John Storm James Thompson
- Builder: Storm and King, Saint John, New Brunswick
- Launched: 1854
- Out of service: 1859
- Fate: Burned 15 November 1859; Hulk scuttled ca. 1889

General characteristics
- Class & type: Al
- Tons burthen: 1292 tons OM, 1108 tons NM
- Length: 195.3 Feet
- Beam: 35.3 Feet
- Draught: 22.0 Feet
- Propulsion: Sail
- Sail plan: Ship, square rig

Herald of the Morning was a three-masted square-rigged sailing ship, built in 1853 or 1854 at Saint John, New Brunswick, Canada, expressly for the Australia run. A contemporary Melbourne press article described her as "a fine ship of 1292 tons register.

Wright claims she was built in 1853, but not registered until 1854, but some sources cite 1855 Port number 27, The ship was also owned by George King and John Storm. James Thompson

== Voyages ==
- Liverpool to Melbourne 19 December 1854, Captain John Attridge.
- Liverpool to Melbourne 1857
- Liverpool to Sydney New South Wales, 25 June 1858, Cpt. G Rudolph, Master, Burthen 1291 tons
- Melbourne to Callao, 9 August 1858
- Liverpool to Melbourne 5 November 1859

== Fire and wreck ==
In 1859, at the end of her second voyage to Australia, carrying 419 government immigrants, Herald of the Morning was anchored in Hobsons Bay when, at about 12:45 pm on 15 November, the captain awoke to someone yelling "fire!" The fire quickly spread through the entire vessel. Attempts were made to scuttle the ship by cutting holes in her side near the waterline, but she became lighter as she burnt and the scuttling holes rose above the water level. An effort was made to move the ship by slipping the anchor chains, but the heat drove the crew back. Finally, the vessel was cut through from the outside and towed ashore at Sandridge, (now Port Melbourne) by two tugs, Lioness and Sophia, where it was left to burn.

The tugs Sophia and Hercules later towed the ship to the beach between Sandridge and Williamstown where she continued to smoulder (UID 152). In about 1889, the hulk was eventually removed and sunk at the end of Donaldsons jetty.

The wreck was advertised for sale on 28 November 1859. Included in the cargo was iron work intended for the Hawthorn Bridge and, while that was recovered, the fire had damaged it. It was subsequently salvaged and partly sold at auction eventually becoming the trusses for the Mia Mia Bridge at Redesdale.

The hulk appears to have remained sitting on the beach for many years until the Melbourne Harbour Trust Commissioners adopted the following recommendations of its Finance Committee:

Your Committee recommend that Messrs. H. B. Donaldson and Co. be called upon as provided by Section 76 of the Act to remove their sunken hulk in Hobson's Bay at Sandridge within a reasonable time (to be named in the notice), and should they fail to remove the said hulk within such time, that she be removed by the Trust as provided by the said Section. Your Committee further recommend that the firm named and Messrs. Stewart, White and Co. be called upon to attorn tenants to the trust under conditions to be submitted by this Committee to the Commissioners and approved by them.
