= William Henry Yaldwyn =

Member of the Queensland Legislative Assembly & Queensland Legislative Council

William Yaldwyn
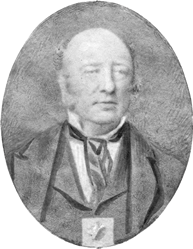

Member of the Queensland Legislative Council
- In office 1 May 1860 – 13 June 1863
- In office 1 May 1865 – 28 September 1866

Personal details
- Born: William Henry Yaldwyn; 6 September 1800 Lodsworth, Sussex, England
- Died: 28 September 1866 (aged 66) Double Bay, New South Wales, Australia
- Spouse: Henrietta Mary Bowles (m.1831)
- Occupation: Pastoralist

William Henry Yaldwyn (6 September 1801 – 28 September 1866) was a member of the Queensland Legislative Council.

== Early life ==
Yaldwyn was born at Blackdown House in Lodsworth, Sussex, England on 6 September 1801 to Richard Yaldwyn and his wife Martha (née Serle; he was privately educated on the family estate.

In 1831, he had married Henrietta Mary Bowles in Cuckfield, Sussex. They were to have three children including William Yaldwyn Jr., who also went on to be appointed to the Queensland Legislative Council.

Yaldwyn travelled to Australia on 5 May 1836 from Gravesend to Sydney on the William Glen Anderson. His wife Henrietta, their two children William (Willy) and Henrietta (Dally) with Caroline Bowles his sister-in-law accompanied him. After a short stay in Sydney the family travelled to Yass where Yaldwyn purchased 2,695 acres (1,091 ha) of land freehold from the Government of New South Wales. William and Henrietta had their third child in Yass called Burton born on 19 September 1837.

Yaldwyn sent trusted friend John Coppock (1795–1865) to Port Phillip to source a station there and in about September 1838 the Yaldwyn family occupied the station called "Barfold" near Kyneton. The stay at "Barfold" was brief and in 1839 they sold "Barfold" and moved to Melbourne. Yaldwyn was included on the first roll of magistrates by Captain William Lonsdale. Yaldwyn was one of the first subscribers to the Melbourne Club and ran two horses at the first race meeting at Flemington Racecourse as well as attending as a steward. He purchased several blocks of land at Brunswick, Prahran, Kalkallo and Collins Street. Property values fell rapidly and William Yaldwyn was forced to sell.

He made several sea trips to Australia before settling in Queensland.

== Politics ==
Yaldwyn was appointed to the Queensland Legislative Council on 1 May 1860 and resigned on 13 June 1863. Once again being appointed on 1 May 1865, he served until his death one year later on 28 September 1866.

== Later life ==
Yaldwyn died on 28 September 1866 at Edgecliff House, Double Bay in Sydney and was buried at St Judes Churchyard, Randwick, Sydney.

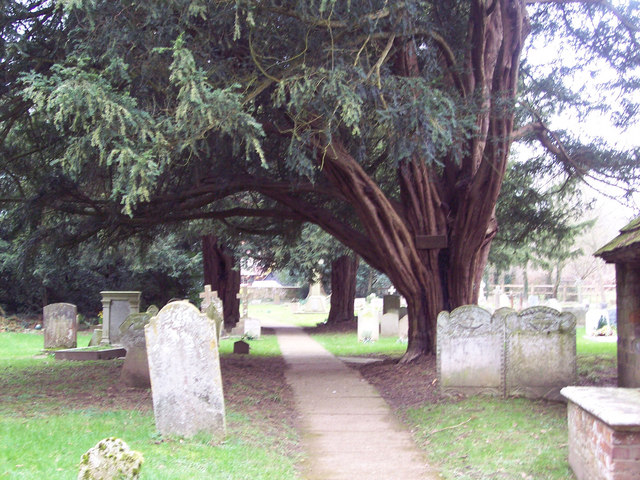
Yew tree in St Laurence's Churchyard The plaque reads "This yew tree was planted by William Henry Yaldwyn of Blackdown and Valewood on his 21st birthday September 6th, 1821"
