= Redesdale Junction =

Former railway station in Victoria, Australia

General information
- Location: Victoria, Australia
- Coordinates: 37°13′47″S 144°24′39″E
- Line: Redesdale railway line

Other information
- Status: Closed

History
- Opened: 15 January 1891
- Closed: 29 June 1954

Services
Preceding station	Disused railways	Following station
Kyneton	Melbourne - Bendigo railway	Malmsbury
Junction	Redesdale line	Edgecombe
	List of closed railway stations in Victoria	
Location

Redesdale Junction was a railway station and junction for the Redesdale line near Kyneton in Victoria, Australia. The junction employed a station master, porter, assistant gatekeeper and ganger. A post office operated from the junction until the station master position was abolished in 1930.

The junction was an important centre for the small community. In 1918 the station master was given a lavish farewell and a marble clock when it was announced he was being transferred.

The sandstone used for the Shrine of Remembrance was quarried nearby and taken by train to Melbourne via Redesdale Junction.
