= Bendigo Fire Station =

Heritage listed building in Victoria, Australia

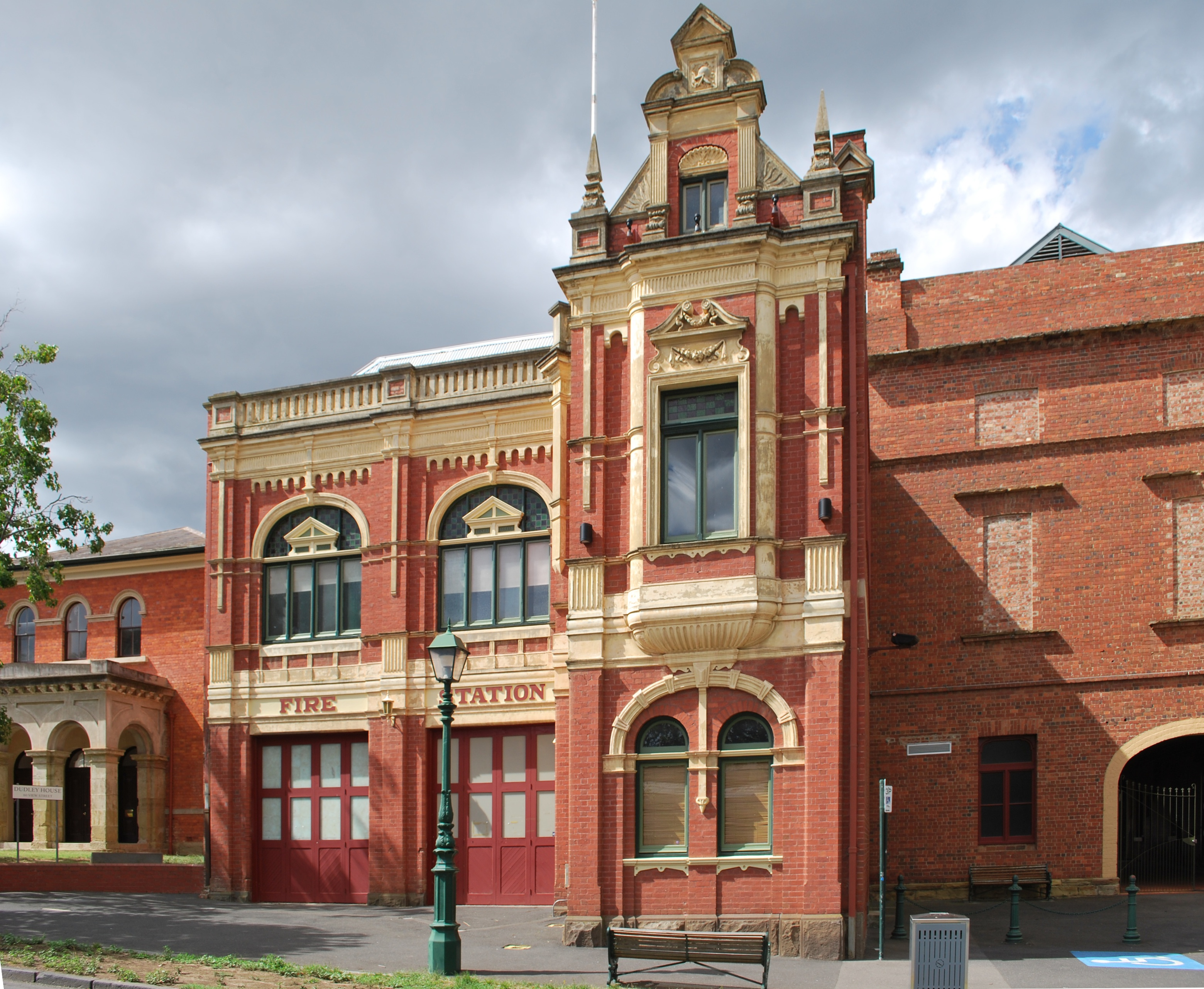
- The building in February 2010

- Location within Australia
- 36.757164°S 144.276030°E
- Location: 58 View St, Bendigo, Victoria

History
- Built: 1898-99

Site notes
- Architect: William Beebe

Victorian Heritage Register

The Bendigo Fire Station, also known as the Former Bendigo Fire Station, is a historic fire station in Bendigo, Victoria.

It was designed by architect William Beebe and built during 1898–99. It is a two-storey brick-faced building with stucco detailing.

It is listed on the Victorian Heritage Register.
