= Shire of Bet Bet =

Coordinates: 36°51′S 143°44′E

- Local government area
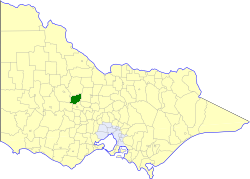
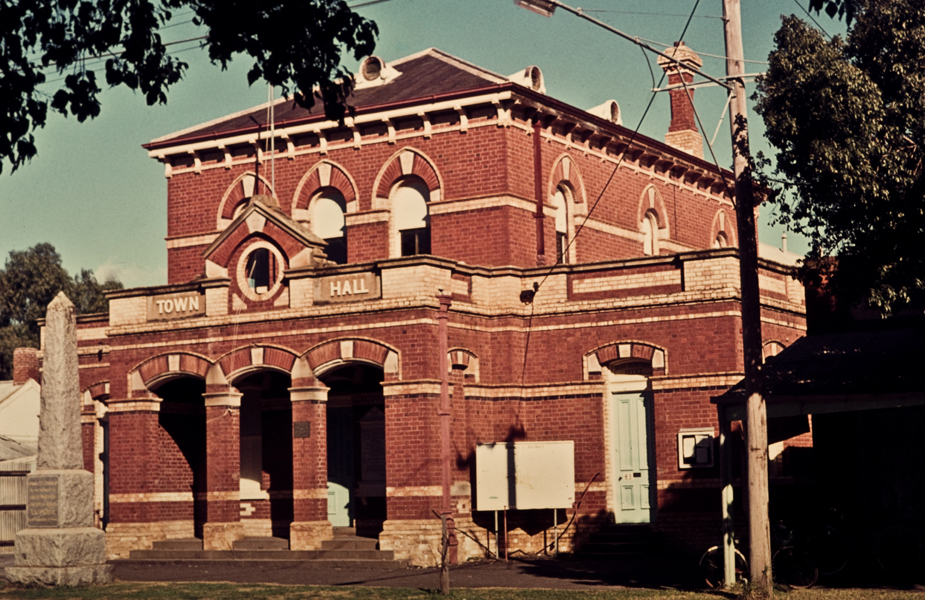
- Location in Victoria Shire of Bet Bet Town Hall in the 1970's
- The Shire of Bet Bet as at its dissolution in 1995
- Country: Australia
- State: Victoria
- Region: North Central Victoria
- Established: 1861
- Council seat: Dunolly

Area
  - Total: 928.2 km^{2} (358.4 sq mi)

Population
  - Total(s): 2,120 (1992)
  - Density: 2.284/km^{2} (5.916/sq mi)
- County: Gladstone
LGAs around Shire of Bet Bet
Kara Kara	Korong	Marong
Kara Kara	Shire of Bet Bet	Marong
Avoca	Tullaroop	Maldon

The Shire of Bet Bet was a local government area located about 180 kilometres (112 mi) northwest of Melbourne, the state capital of Victoria, Australia. The shire covered an area of 928.2 square kilometres (358.4 sq mi), and existed from 1861 until 1995.

== History ==
Bet Bet was first incorporated as a road district on 18 January 1861, and became a shire on 20 September 1864.

On 1 October 1915, two boroughs were united with Bet Bet; Tarnagulla Borough, established on 12 August 1857, with an area of 20.77 square kilometres (8.02 sq mi), and Dunolly Borough, established on 21 May 1858, with an area of 23.31 square kilometres (9.00 sq mi).

On 20 January 1995, the Shire of Bet Bet was abolished, and along with the City of Maryborough, the Shire of Tullaroop and a number of surrounding districts, was merged into the newly created Shire of Central Goldfields. The Tarnagulla district was transferred to the newly created Shire of Loddon.

== Wards ==
The Shire of Bet Bet was divided into three ridings on 31 May 1988, each of which elected three councillors:

- Bealiba Riding
- Dunolly Riding
- Tarnagulla Riding

== Towns and localities ==
- Archdale
- Arnold
- Bealiba
- Bet Bet
- Betley
- Bromley
- Dunluce
- Dunolly*
- Goldsborough
- Havelock
- Inkerman
- Llanelly
- Moliagul
- Mount Hooghly
- Timor West

Tarnagulla District:

- Murphys Creek
- Newbridge
- Painswick
- Tarnagulla
- Waanyarra

* Council seat.

== Population ==
Year	Population
1954	2,296
1958	2,340*
1961	2,078
1966	1,975
1971	1,717
1976	1,686
1981	1,681
1986	1,905
1991	2,016

* Estimate in the 1958 Victorian Year Book.

== See also ==
- Bet Bet Creek
- List of reduplicated Australian place names
