= Mia Mia, Victoria =

Mia Mia
- Town
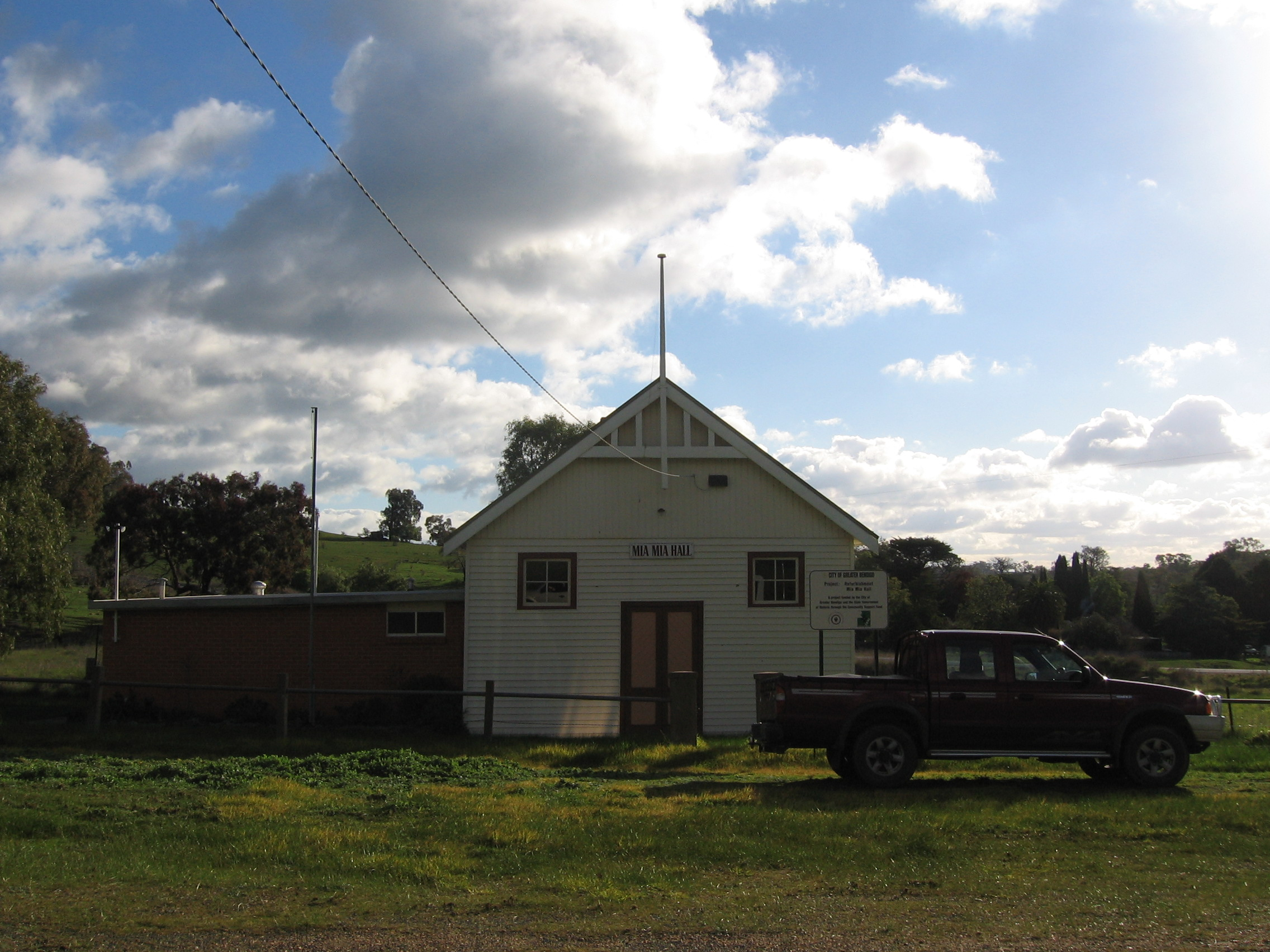
- Community Hall

- Interactive map of Mia Mia
- Coordinates: 37°00′3″S 144°33′49″E
- Country: Australia
- State: Victoria
- Region: Hume, Loddon Mallee
- LGAs: City of Greater Bendigo; Shire of Mitchell
- Location: 119 km (74 mi) NW of Melbourne; 56 km (35 mi) SE of Bendigo; 35 km (22 mi) NE of Kyneton; 19 km (12 mi) SW of Heathcote

Government
  - State electorate: Euroa
  - Federal division: Bendigo

Population
  - Total: 265 (2011 census)
- Postcode: 3444

Mia Mia is a locality of Central Victoria, Australia, 119 kilometres (74 mi) north of Melbourne and 56 kilometres (35 mi) south of Bendigo. It is largely an area of broadacre farms raising cattle and sheep. It is a part of the Heathcote wine region Wine District and a number of vineyards have been established in the area, most notably producing Shiraz grapes. Its local government areas are the City of Greater Bendigo and Shire of Mitchell, Mia Mia is part of the Federal Electorates of Bendigo and McEwen and it is in the state electorate of Euroa. In 2011, it had a population of 265.

== History ==
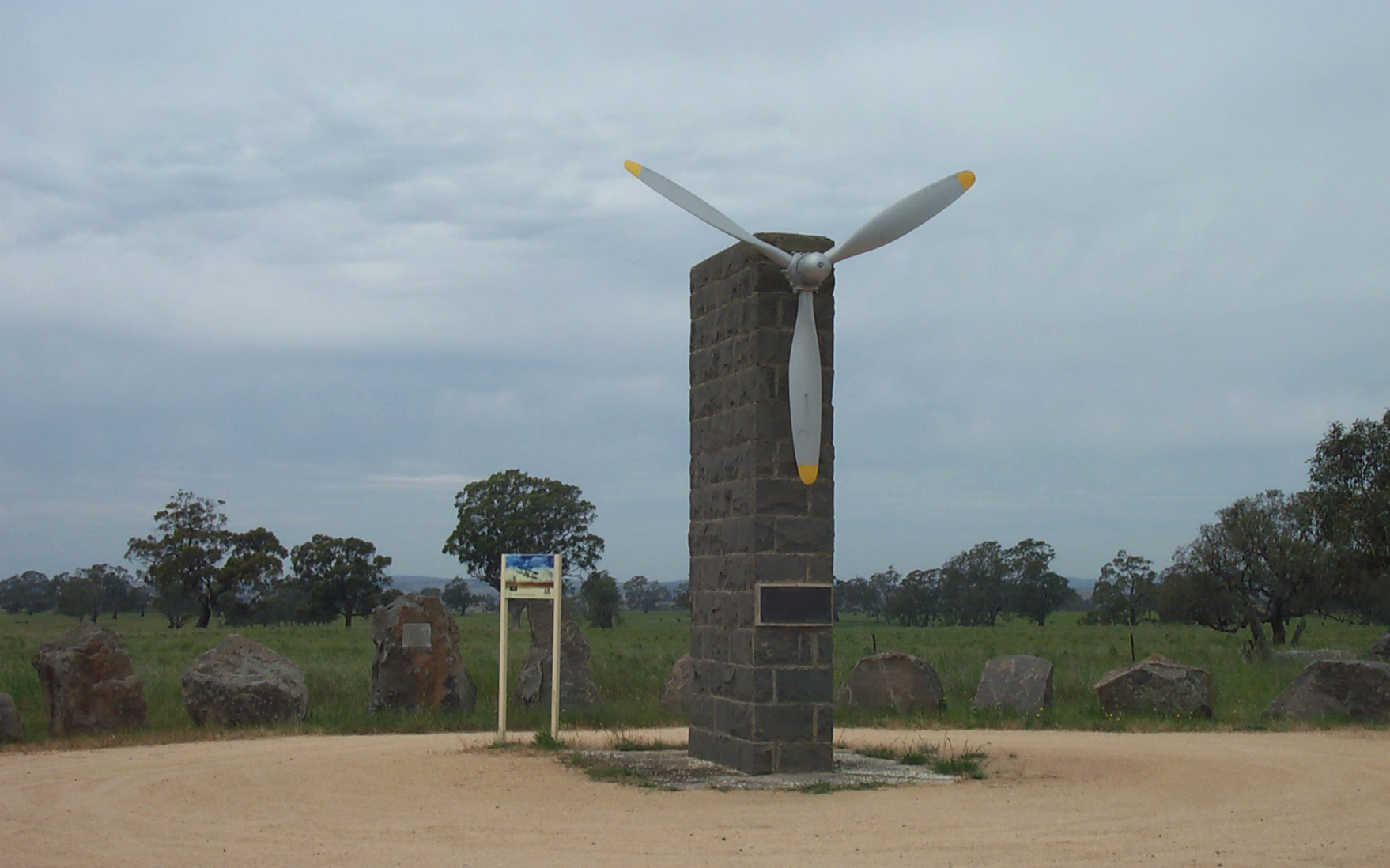
Memorial near Mia Mia, commemorating the first Australian-built aeroplane.

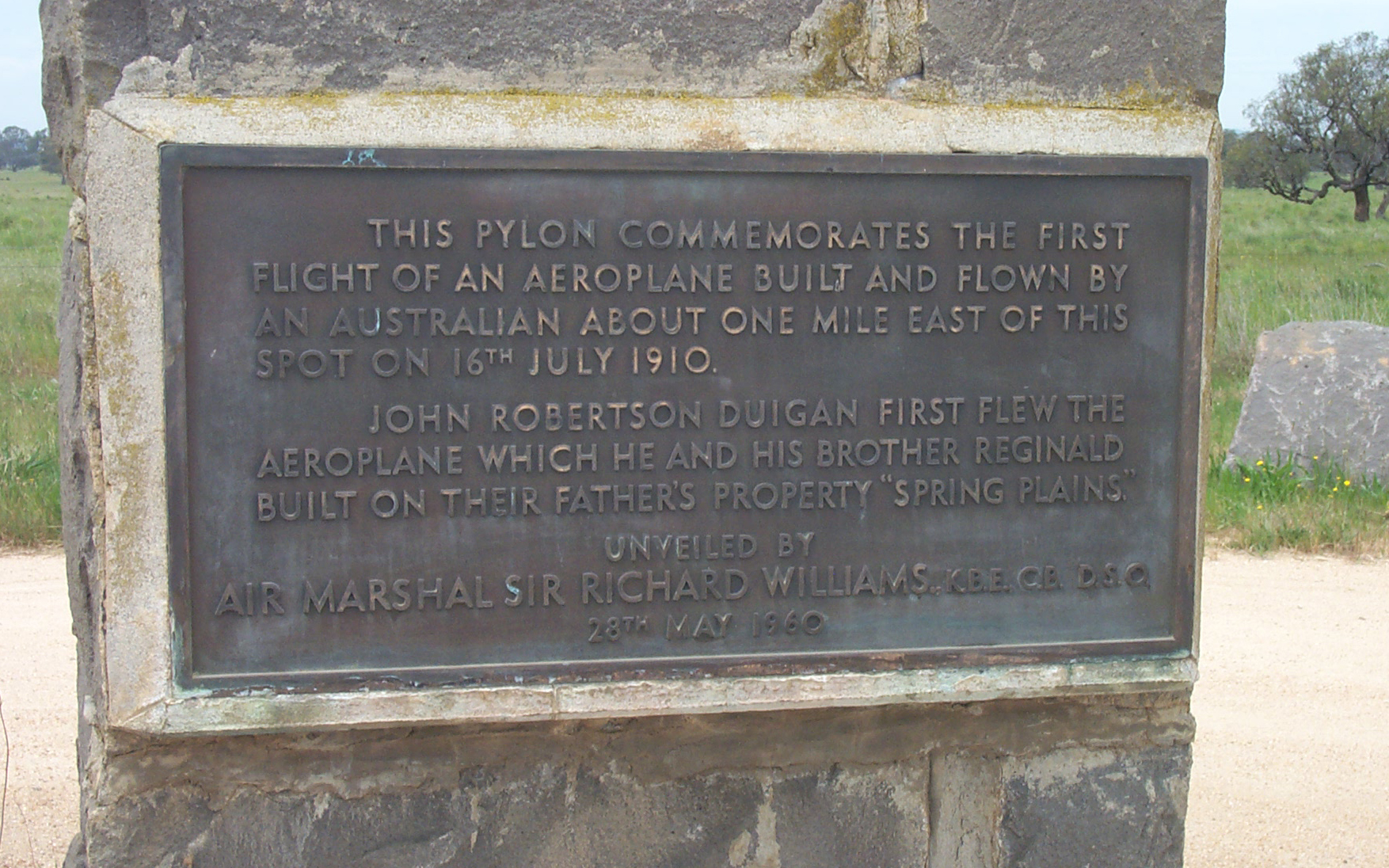
Plaque on memorial near Mia Mia, commemorating the first Australian-built aeroplane.

The name is derived from a Taungurung word meaning "camp" or "dwelling". The Post Office opened on 22 November 1861, closing in 1970.

Mia Mia is notable for being the home of John Duigan and brother Reginald Duigan who built and flew the first Australian made aeroplane in 1910 on their property named Spring Plains. A monument to their endeavours was constructed out of local bluestone and unveiled in 1960.

Mia Mia’s western boundary is on the Campaspe River which is crossed by an iron bridge near Redesdale that is unusual in design and is quite memorable for those passing through.

=== Gold escort robbery ===
Mia Mia was the location of a violent gold escort robbery in 1853. A gang of at least six robbers and possibly as many as twelve bailed up a gold escort on the way to Kyneton. The robbers opened fire on the six escorts and four were wounded. The other two fled to Heathcote to raise the alarm. When help arrived they found the robbers and the gold were gone. Later John Francis gave crown evidence against the others and three of the villains were hanged.

=== Burke and Wills ===
The Burke and Wills expedition passed through Mia Mia in 1860 on their journey across Australia from Melbourne to the Gulf of Carpentaria. They arrived on Saturday, 25 August 1860 and made Camp VI, (their sixth camp since leaving Melbourne). Sunday was taken as a rest day when the men caught up on chores and they left on Monday morning. The road from Lancefield to Mia Mia via Ben Loch and the Great Dividing Range is now called 'The Burke and Wills Track'. In 2010 the town erected a small monument to the expedition to mark the sesquicentenary of their visit.

=== Heritage listing ===
The following place in Mia Mia is listed on the Victorian Heritage Register:

- Redesdale Bridge, Heathcote–Redesdale Road, built in 1867 and known as the Mia Mia Bridge until 2015

== See also ==
- List of reduplicated Australian place names
