= Alma, Victoria =

Alma
- Town
- Coordinates: 37°1′38″S 143°40′40″E
- Country: Australia
- State: Victoria
- LGA: Shire of Central Goldfields
- Location: 174 km (108 mi) NW of Melbourne; 78 km (48 mi) N of Ballarat; 93 km (58 mi) SE of Bendigo; 7 km (4.3 mi) W of Maryborough

Government
  - State electorate: Ripon
  - Federal division: Mallee

Population
  - Total: 195 (2021 census)
- Postcode: 3465

Alma is a locality in Victoria, Australia, along the Maryborough – St Arnaud Road, west of Maryborough. In the 2021 census, Alma and the surrounding area had a population of 195.

Alma began as a gold-mining settlement and was named after the Battle of Alma in the Crimean War. It was surveyed in 1860, the Post Office opening on 1 July 1861. (closed 1969), and proclaimed in 1891. It had a peak population of 2,109.
