= Rathscar =

- Town
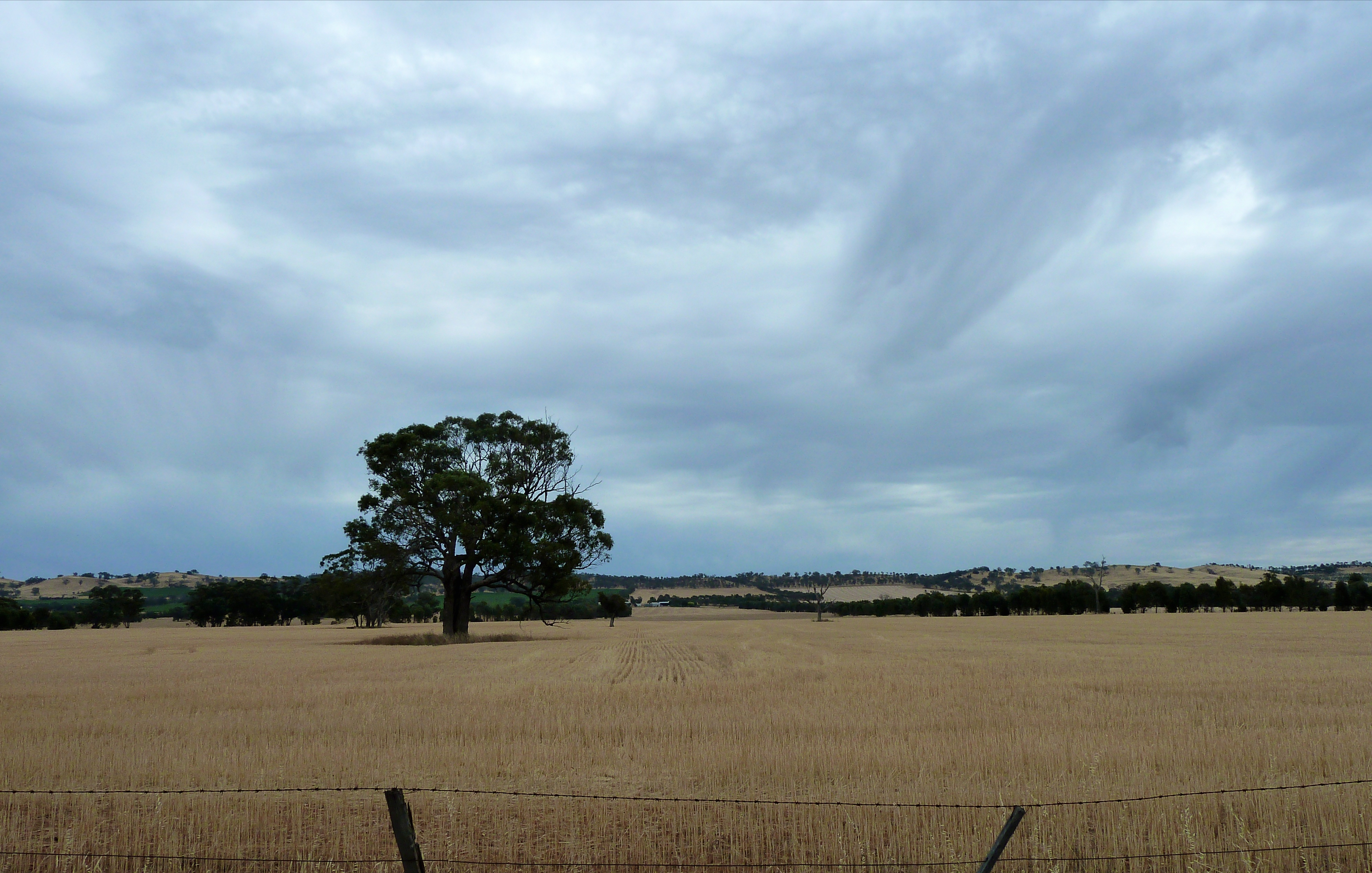
- Typical wheat country in central Victoria

- Coordinates: 36.9742287°S 143.5212222°E
- Country: Australia
- State: Victoria
- LGAs: Pyrenees Shire; Shire of Central Goldfields
- Location: 188 km (117 mi) NE of Melbourne; 83 km (52 mi) N of Ballarat; 19 km (12 mi) W of Maryborough; 17 km (11 mi) N of Avoca

Government
  - State electorate: Ripon
  - Federal division: Mallee

Population
  - Total: 19 (SAL 2021)
- Postcode: 3465

Rathscar is a locality in Pyrenees Shire and the Shire of Central Goldfields. The area to the east of the Avoca River known as Rathscar West was surveyed in 1899.

== Gold mining ==
The Melbourne newspaper The Argus reported in 1903 that a new gold-bearing reef had been discovered in Rathscar.

== People ==
The "largest landholder and possibly the wealthiest" in the area was Charles Wilson from Sunny Park ( Coordinates 36.9813035°S 143.607879°E ). Wilson's daughter Maude Wilson married John Miller in 1901 at Sunny Park and they then lived in the Rathscar district where their four children were born.

== Property ==
There was a Primary School (Numbered 1535) at Rathscar West.

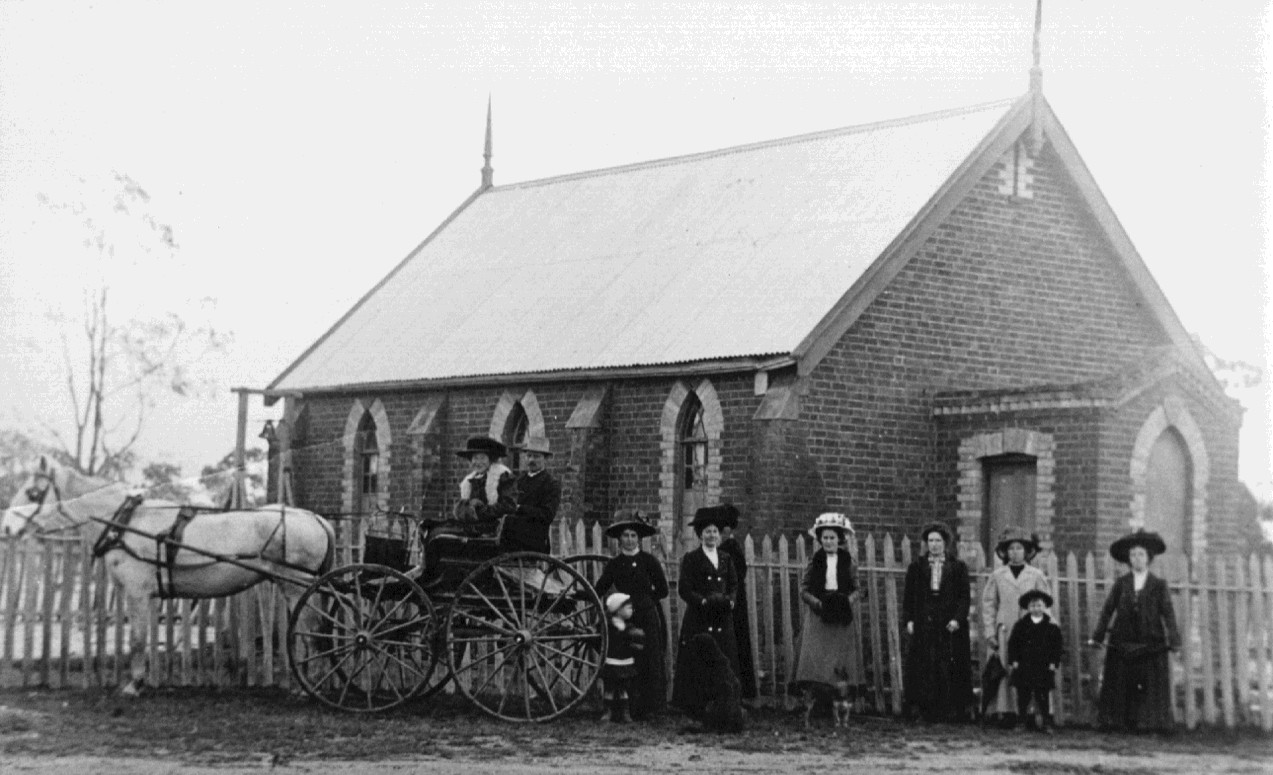
Methodist Church, Upper Homebush which was subsequently dismantled in 1928 and re-erected at Rathscar West

Rathscar West had a Methodist church, initially constructed in timber and built around 1870. As well as the Sunday services, the church hosted a number of activities including concerts, harvest festivals and Sunday School picnics.

The timber building was replaced by brick church (recycled from the former Methodist Church / Wesleyan Chapel Homebush - 6 km away) in 1928. In 2018, this former Rathcar West church building is now privately owned.

The Pyrenees Shire Council has documented a number of buildings in Rathscar including the Methodist Church, the Avonlea Farm House and the Elliot farm complex, in the Avoca Heritage Study: 1864 - 1994 - Volume 3.

== See also ==
- Adelaide Lead, Victoria
- Bung Bong, Victoria
- Homebush, Victoria
- Lamplough, Victoria
- List of locations in the Shire of Pyrenees
- List of localities in the Shire of Central Goldfields
- Pyrenees Highway, Victoria
- Richmond Lass
- Wareek, Victoria
