= Pyrenees Highway, Victoria =

Highway in western Victoria, Australia

Pyrenees Highway Victoria
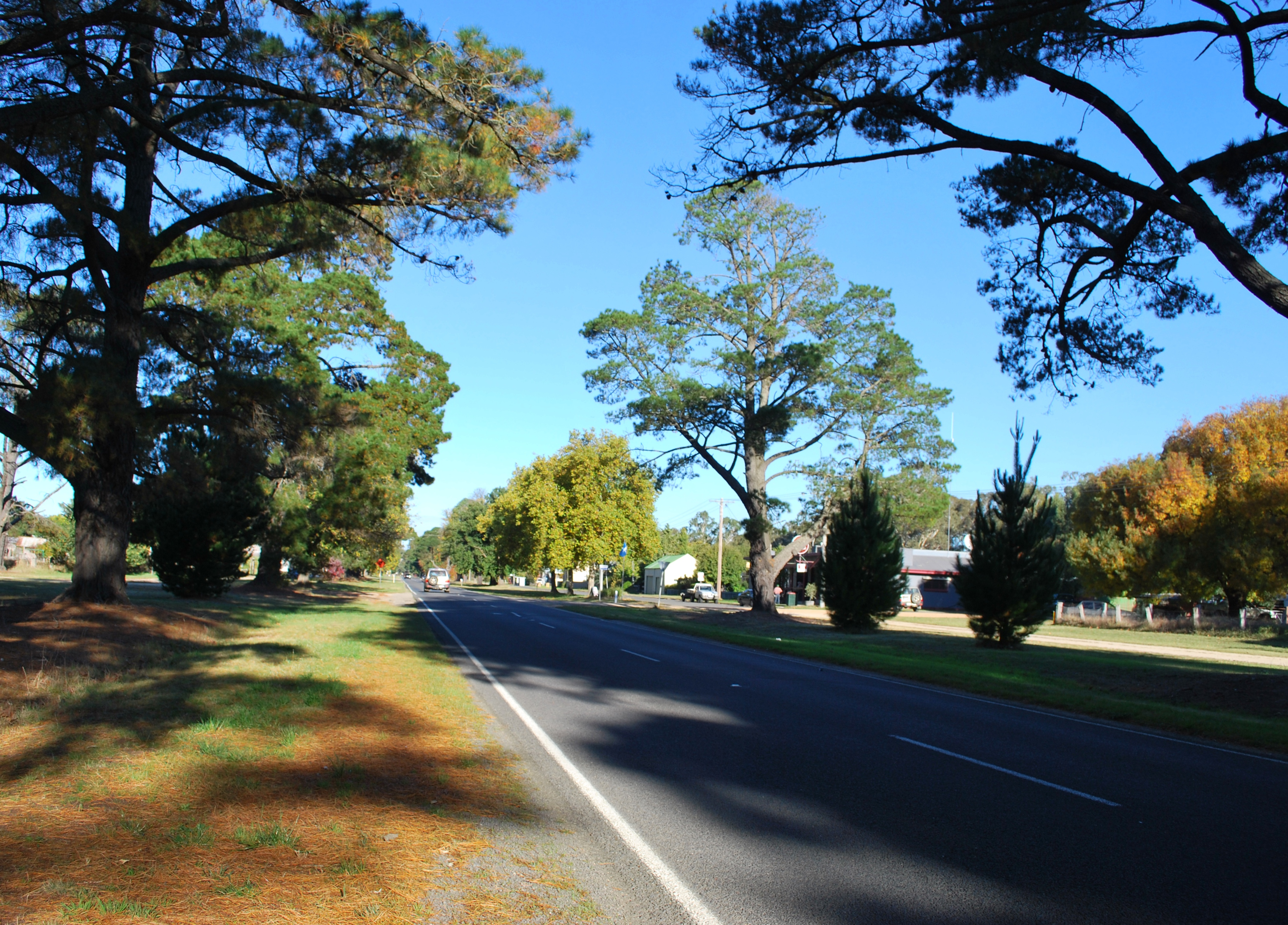
- Pyrenees Highway through Elmhurst
- Coordinates: 37.282489°S 142.931756°E (West end); 37.092415°S 144.330283°E (East end)

General information
- Type: Highway
- Length: 148.4 km (92 mi)
- Gazetted: May 1915 (as Main Road); August 1938 (as State Highway)
- Route number(s): B180 (1998–present)
- Former route number: State Route 122 (1986–1998)

Major junctions
- West end: Mortlake-Ararat Road; Ararat, Victoria
- Western Highway; Sunraysia Highway; Midland Highway; Calder Freeway
- East end: Bendigo-Sutton Grange Road; Elphinstone, Victoria

Location(s)
- Region: Grampians, Loddon Mallee
- Major settlements: Amphitheatre, Avoca, Maryborough, Castlemaine, Chewton

Highway system
- Highways in Australia; National Highway • Freeways in Australia; Highways in Victoria

Pyrenees Highway is a rural highway in western Victoria, Australia, linking Ararat to Elphinstone. It was named after the Pyrenees ranges, the set of low mountain ridges the road travels through.

== Route ==
Pyrenees Highway commences at the intersection with Western Highway and Mortlake-Ararat Road in Ararat and heads in a north-easterly direction as a two-lane, single carriageway rural highway, winding with gentle curves through the Pyrenees ranges through Elmhurst to Avoca where it meets Sunraysia Highway. It continues in an easterly direction through Maryborough to Castlemaine, where it meets Midland Highway, and continues east through Chewton before it eventually terminates at the interchange with Calder Freeway at Elphinstone.

== History ==
The passing of the Chinese Immigration Act 1855 through the Parliament of Victoria severely limited the number of Chinese passengers permitted on an arriving vessel. To evade the new law, ship's captains landed many Chinese in the south-east of South Australia, from where the new arrivals travelled more than 400 km across country to the Victorian goldfields, along tracks including what is now Pyrenees Highway.

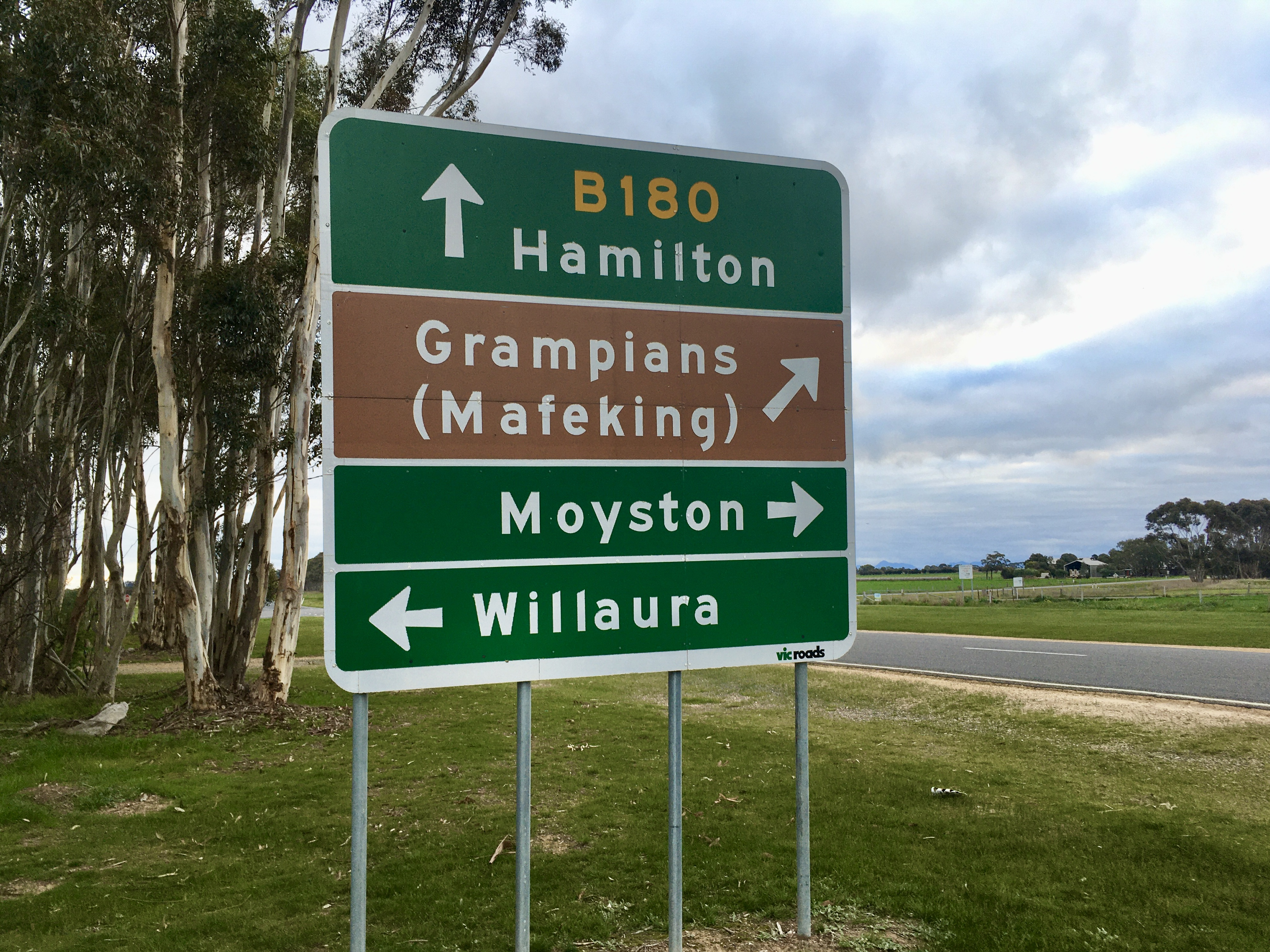
Pyrenees Highway (B180) road sign at Willaura heading south between Ararat and Glenthompson.

Construction of a replacement Glenmona Bridge as a wrought-iron lattice-girder deck-truss bridge over Bet Bet Creek at Bung Bong was completed in 1871, and still stands, minus the deck, today; it replaced a timber structure from 1857 which was washed away by severe floods in 1870. It is the third-oldest of its type in Victoria, is listed on the Victorian Heritage Register, and stands just to the south of the modern-day bridge used today by the highway.

The passing of the Country Roads Act 1912 through the Parliament of Victoria provided for the establishment of the Country Roads Board (later VicRoads) and their ability to declare Main Roads, taking responsibility for the management, construction and care of the state's major roads from local municipalities. Ararat-(Elmhurst-)Avoca Road from Ararat through Elmhurst and Amphitheatre to Avoca, and Avoca-Maryborough Road from Avoca to Bung Bong, were declared Main Roads on 31 May 1915; Castlemaine–Maryborough Road was declared a Main Road between Maryborough through Carisbrook to Joyces Creek on 21 June 1915, and between Joyces Creek through Newstead to Castlemaine on 28 June 1915; and the rest of Avoca-Maryborough Road between Bung Bong and Maryborough was declared a Main Road on 21 June 1915.

The passing of the Highways and Vehicles Act 1924 provided for the declaration of State Highways, roads two-thirds financed by the state government through the Country Roads Board. Pyrenees Highway was declared a State Highway in August 1938, cobbled together from roads between Calder Highway at Castlemaine via Maryborough and Avoca to Ararat (for a total of 92.5 miles), subsuming the original declarations of Ararat-Avoca Road, and Avoca-Maryborough Road Castlemaine–Maryborough Road as Main Roads. With the deviation of Calder Highway past Castlemaine declared in the 1959/60 financial year, the previous alignment of Calder Highway between Castlemaine and Elphinstone was added to the eastern end of Pyrenees Highway.

Pyrenees Highway was signed as State Route 122 between Ararat and Elphinstone in 1986; with Victoria's conversion to the newer alphanumeric system in the late 1990s, this was replaced by route B180.

The passing of the Road Management Act 2004 granted the responsibility of overall management and development of Victoria's major arterial roads to VicRoads: in 2011, VicRoads re-declared the road as Pyrenees Highway (Arterial #6740) between Western Highway in Ararat and Calder Freeway at Elphinstone; while the road south of Ararat is signed solely as B180, it is not usually referred to as part of Pyrenees Highway.

== Major intersections and towns ==
LGA	Location	km	mi	Destinations	Notes
Ararat	Ararat	0.0	0.0	Mortlake-Ararat Road (B180 south) – Glenthompson, Lake Bolac, Mortlake	Western terminus of highway, route B180 continues south along Mortlake-Ararat Road
Ararat	Ararat	0.0	0.0	Western Highway (A8) – Horsham, Ballarat, Melbourne	
Ararat	Dunneworthy	16.9	10.5	Ararat-St Arnaud Road (C241) – Navarre, St Arnaud	
Ararat	Elmhurst	31.7	19.7	Avoca railway line	
Pyrenees	Elmhurst	39.9	24.8	Avoca railway line	
Pyrenees	Amphitheatre	49.5	30.8	Avoca railway line	
Avoca River		62.0	38.5	Bridge name unknown	
Pyrenees	Avoca	62.3	38.7	High Street (B220) – Ouyen, St Arnaud, Ballarat	
Bet Bet Creek		70.3	43.7	Bridge name unknown	
Central Goldfields	Maryborough	84.8	52.7	Avoca railway line	
Central Goldfields	Maryborough	86.8	53.9	Maryborough-St Arnaud Road (C275) – Natte Yallock	
Central Goldfields	Maryborough	87.7	54.5	Ballarat-Maryborough Road (C287) – Talbot, Clunes, Ballarat	
Central Goldfields	Maryborough	88.3	54.9	Maryborough-Dunolly Road (C277) – Dunolly, Laanecoorie, Bendigo	
Central Goldfields	Maryborough	89.4	55.6	Mildura railway line	
Central Goldfields	Carisbrook	95.5	59.3	Landringan Road (C288 south) – Red Lion	Concurrency with route C288
Central Goldfields	Carisbrook	96.0	59.7	Carisbrooke-Eddington Road (C288 north) – Eddington	Concurrency with route C288
Cairn Curran Reservoir		113.1	70.3	Bridge name unknown	
Mount Alexander	Newstead	118.1	73.4	Mildura railway line	
Mount Alexander	Newstead	119.3	74.1	Hepburn–Newstead Road (C283/C285 south) – Franklinford, to Creswick-Newstead Road (C283) – Creswick	Western terminus of concurrency with route C283
Loddon River		119.6	74.3	Bridge name unknown	
Mount Alexander	Newstead	120.0	74.6	Maldon-Newstead Road (C283 north) – Maldon, Lockwood South	Eastern terminus of concurrency with route C283
Mount Alexander	McKenzie Hill	131.9	82.0	Castlemaine-Maldon Road (C282) – Maldon, Newbridge, Bridgewater	
Mount Alexander	Castlemaine	133.6	83.0	Victorian Goldfields Railway	
Mount Alexander	Castlemaine	134.7	83.7	Midland Highway (A300 south) – Daylesford, Ballarat, Geelong	Southern terminus of concurrency with route A300
Mount Alexander	Castlemaine	135.6	84.3	Bendigo railway line	
Mount Alexander	Castlemaine	135.9	84.4	Midland Highway (A300 north) – Bendigo, Shepparton, Benalla	Northern terminus of concurrency with route A300
Mount Alexander	Elphinstone	145.6	90.5	Bendigo railway line	
Mount Alexander	Elphinstone	146.6	91.1	Diggers Way – Elphinstone	
Mount Alexander	Elphinstone	146.9	91.3	Bendigo railway line	
Mount Alexander	Elphinstone	147.8	91.8	Old Calder Highway (C794 south) – Elphinstone, Malmsbury; Harmony Way (north) – Faraday, Harcourt	
Mount Alexander	Elphinstone	148.4	92.2	Calder Freeway (M79) – Mildura, Bendigo, Melbourne	
Mount Alexander	Elphinstone	148.4	92.2	Bendigo-Sutton Grange Road – Sutton Grange, Bendigo	Eastern terminus of highway and route B180
1.000 mi = 1.609 km; 1.000 km = 0.621 mi: Concurrency terminus; Route transition

== See also ==
- Adelaide Lead, Victoria
- Ararat, Victoria

- Australian gold rushes
- Highways in Australia
- Highways in Victoria
