= Laracy =

Laracy is a surname. Notable people with the surname include:

- Darina Laracy (1917–2003), Irish journalist and translator
- Michael James Laracy (1871–1952), New Zealand shearer and trade unionist
