= Natte Yallock =

Natte Yallock Victoria
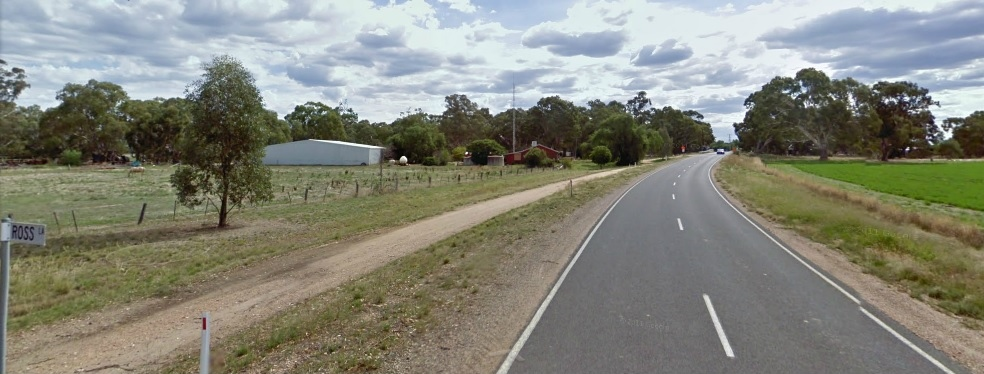

- Coordinates: 36°56′34″S 143°28′44″E
- Population: 94 (2016 census)
- Postcode(s): 3465
- Location: 200 km (124 mi) NW of Melbourne; 90 km (56 mi) N of Ballarat; 90 km (56 mi) SW of Bendigo; 28 km (17 mi) NW of Maryborough; 20 km (12 mi) N of Avoca
- LGA(s): Pyrenees Shire
- State electorate(s): Ripon
- Federal division(s): Mallee

Natte Yallock is a locality in the Australian state of Victoria. Natte Yallock is located in the Pyrenees Shire local government area, 200 km (or 120 miles) north-west of the state capital, Melbourne, and 90 km (or 56 miles) from the regional cities of Bendigo and Ballarat. At the 2006 census, Natte Yallock and the surrounding area had a population of 188.

== Buildings ==
The locality does have a small primary school, which opened in 1874.

The Pyrenees Shire Council has documented a number of significant buildings in the Natte Yallock area in the Avoca Heritage Study: 1864 - 1994 - Volume 3.

== Football ==
Natte Yallock shares an Australian rules football team with nearby Bealiba — the Natte Bealiba Swans — who compete in the Maryborough Castlemaine District Football League, and along with the Natte Bealiba Swans, there is the Natte Yallock cricket club and Natte Yallock tennis club.

== See also ==
- Avoca, Victoria
- Bung Bong, Victoria
- Homebush, Victoria
- List of localities in the Shire of Central Goldfields
- List of locations in the Shire of Pyrenees
