= Wareek =

- Town
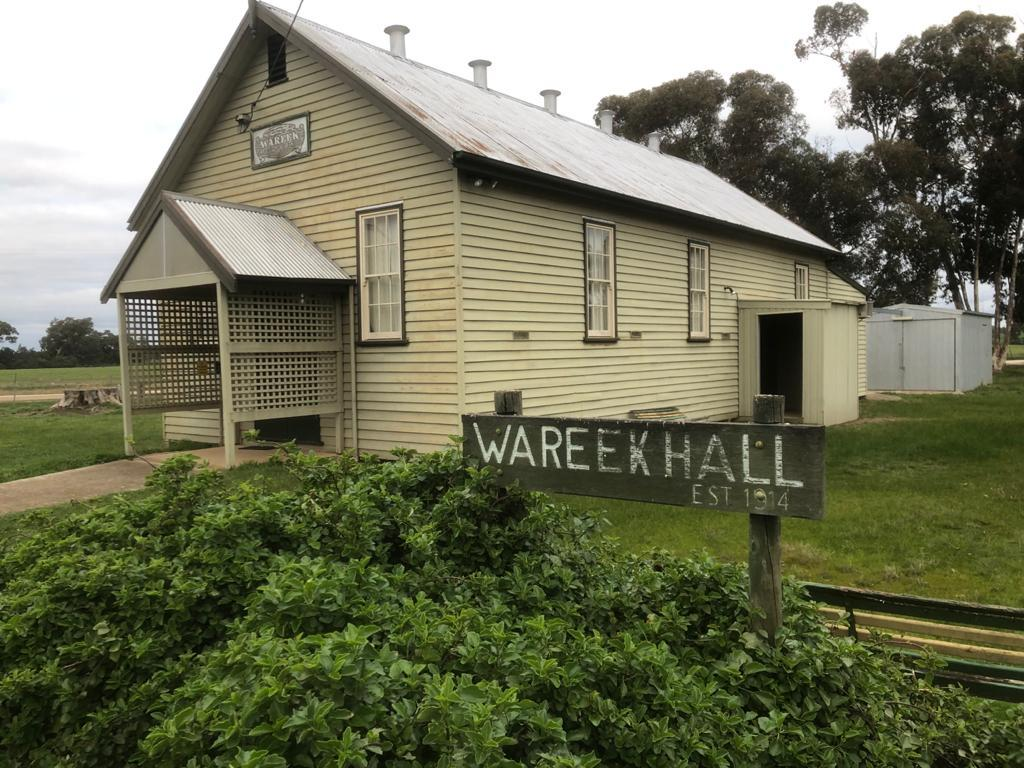
- Wareek Hall

- Coordinates: 37.0004489°S 143.591372°E
- Country: Australia
- State: Victoria
- LGAs: Shire of Central Goldfields; Pyrenees Shire
- Location: 183 km (114 mi) NW of Melbourne; 78 km (48 mi) N of Ballarat; 14 km (8.7 mi) W of Maryborough; 18 km (11 mi) N of Avoca

Government
  - State electorate: Ripon
  - Federal division: Mallee

Population
  - Total: 37 (2021 census)
- Postcode: 3465

Wareek is a locality in Pyrenees Shire and the Shire of Central Goldfields, Victoria, Australia. At the 2021 census, Wareek had a population of 72.

== History ==
The Bung Bong, Wareek cemetery

The "largest landholder and possibly the wealthiest" in the area was Charles Wilson from Sunny Park Wareek

The Norwood Homestead on Norwood Road (constructed in 1863) is registered on the Register of the National Estate.

The Wareek Hall was officially opened in August 1914. The opening ceremony included speeches, a concert and concluded with a "bountiful supper". The centenary of that opening was "celebrated" in August 2014.

== See also ==
- Bung Bong, Victoria
- Homebush, Victoria
- List of localities in the Shire of Central Goldfields
- List of locations in the Shire of Pyrenees
- Rathscar, Victoria
