= Adelaide Lead =

Locality in Victoria, Australia

- Town
- Coordinates: 37°04′22″S 143°40′39″E
- Country: Australia
- State: Victoria
- LGA: Shire of Central Goldfields
- Location: 174 km (108 mi) NW of Melbourne; 68 km (42 mi) N of Ballarat; 7 km (4.3 mi) SW of Maryborough

Government
  - State electorate: Ripon
  - Federal division: Mallee
- Elevation: 225 m (738 ft)

Population
  - Total: 85 (2021 census)
- Postcode: 3465

Adelaide Lead is a locality in Victoria, Australia, located on Old Avoca Road, 7 kilometres (4.3 mi) south-west of Maryborough, west of the Paddy Ranges State Park, in the Shire of Central Goldfields. Located on the northern slopes of the Central Highlands, the area is naturally characterised by Box-Ironbark forest. Remnants of Aboriginal settlement include rock wells beside Possum Gully Road.

At the 2016 Census, it had a population of 81. At the 2021 Census, it had a population of 85.

== History ==
Adelaide Lead began as a mining settlement, and covered about 3 miles (4.8 km) along the banks of Timor Creek. A state school operated from 1863 to 1954. The building, which still stands, was later used as a community hall in which Saturday night 'old time' dances were held until the late 1970s.

The area was in the eastern part of the Glenmona Pastoral Station, taken up by Isaac Moorson and Edmund McNeill in 1839 and officially established as Glenmona by Edmund McNeill and Charles Hall in 1845. In 1848 Glenmona controlled 62,080 acres (251.2 km^{2}), grazing 12,000 sheep and 150 cattle. It was the second largest property in the area, centred on the Bet Bet Creek which provided permanent water. The property was owned by the Mills family from 1875 until 1995. When the property was sold in 1995 it comprised 1,182 acres (478 hectares).

Adelaide Lead started as a canvas town. The first proper house in Adelaide Lead was where the Mallard family later lived. It was later used as a private school by Mrs Slater.

In 1868 there was one hotel, two stores, a dairy, a butcher's shop, a blacksmith and a wheelwright. Most goods came from Talbot. In earlier years there had been two hotels - the Adelaide and the Junction.

The first school was opened by Mrs Slater in a private house. In 1863 a Common School was opened on the other side of the road in a property owned by the Primitive Methodists. Mr Gibson was the first teacher. There was a local collection of money which was given to the government to assist in the construction of the school building. The Adelaide Lead School was No 25, built with hand made bricks, was opened in late in 1873. In the late 1880s head teacher David Bilton and wife taught at Adelaide Lead, driving across from Craigie by buggy each day. Mr I Daniels was the teacher in the seven years leading up to 1914. Mrs Chamberlain was the head teacher when the school closed in May 1954. The building was purchased by the Tullaroop Shire Council and is used as a public hall.

Adelaide Lead in 1866 was a busy centre with many cottages and puddling machines, gardens, two smithies, dairies, several stores but no hotel. John Mintner was the blacksmith, while stores were operated by George Gellan and William Hall in partnership, Frederick Faulkner, William Blackey, William Pennock, John Dellar and Arthur Lindsay. Mr Henry Rudrum had a small holding with grapes and made wine in the 1860s and 70s.

Adelaide Lead had a pottery set up by an English immigrant, Mr Plumridge, in 1869. Mr Plumridge created an ideal environment for his work; he built a 40 ft by 15 ft by 15 ft building where he added kilns and mills. He named it the Burnham Pottery. The clay in the area was ideal for his range of products. Mr Plumridge made and displayed ornamental vases, Italian baskets, flower pots, as well as utilitarian butter churns, wine kegs, 8 gallon jars, milk pans, wash basins etc. His wares were waterproof and considered high quality. The price was 2 shillings a dozen for flowerpots.

Early settler names – Abbott, Bartlett, Neyland, Dupuy, Delaney, Chadwick, Everett, Hibbins, Nole, Jose, Watson, Selman, Cruickshank, Williams, Sanders, Dillon, Keyes.

Cricket was the area's first organised team sport. The first club was at Carisbrook in 1957 and teams soon were formed in Upper and Lower Adelaide Lead and Chinamans Flat. In 1901 Adelaide Lead, Bung Bong and Bowenvale were fielding teams in the local association. The Adelaide Lead Cricket Ground remained until the 1950s and was then incorporated into farmland.

=== Demographics ===
Reports in a range of official documents record the following population numbers at Adelaide Lead: 1855 (June)- 6000, 1858 (Aug)- 2000, 1859 - 1055, 1861 - 405 1865 - 600 1923 - less than 100, 1974 - 50.

The 1861 Census return for Adelaide Lead, Blutchers Reef and adjoining gold workings showed a total population of 405 (275 males and 130 females). Only 100 people were born in Victoria, with 169 born in England, 41 in Scotland and 24 in Ireland. 35 were born in Germany. This census listed no people from China. The census listed occupations: 207 men engaged in alluvial sinking, 30 in gold puddling, 45 as diggers undefined, 10 in quartz crushing amalgam and gold quartz raising, 5 in trading, 5 carters, 2 labourers, 3 food and drinks, 184 domestics or children (58 male, 126 female). There were 107 children from 0 to 9 years, with 110 men and 34 women aged 25 to 34 years.

=== Post office ===
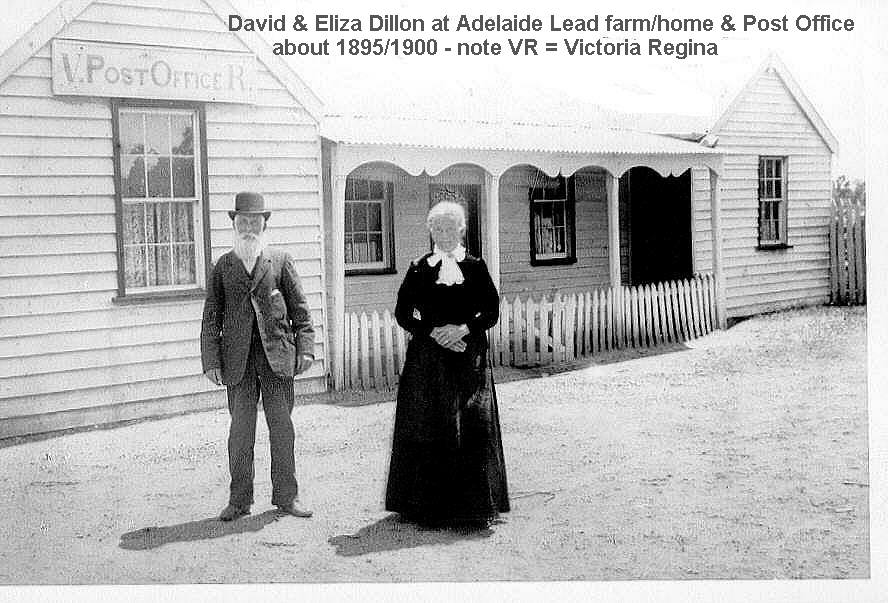
Post Office, Postmaster and his wife abt.1890s

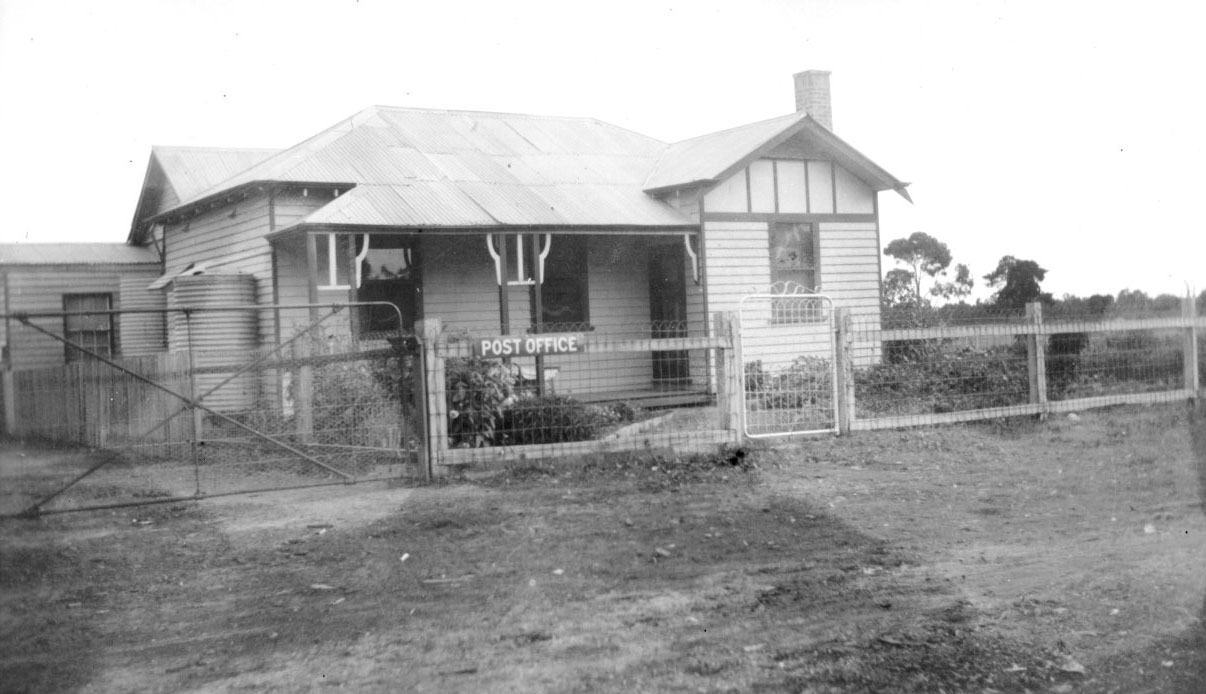
Adelaide Lead Post Office circa 1950s

The first post office was opened on 1 August 1864 by William Noller, and was taken over by his widow after his death (Mrs Noller was the first lady postmistress in Victoria), later from 1879 by David Dillon and following his death in 1910 by his son James until 1914, when James was formally recorded as Postmaster, an appointment which continued until 1945. Mrs Annie Elizabeth (Lalie) Martin was appointed Postmistress in 1945 and thereafter the PO remained open until 1957 operated by Mrs AE (Lalie) Martin. Mrs Martin collected the mail each week day from the train at the Adelaide Lead station, about 1.5 km from the Post Office. The Post Office was a freestanding room off the verandah of the Martin house from 1945 until 1957. The Adelaide Lead Post Office was never a telegraph office, catering only for mails and postal notes, and later old age pension payments.

Postal services by mail coaches to and from Maryborough and Avoca via Adelaide Lead and Bung Bong six times each week commenced in 1865. At 5am each day the Cobb & Co coach passed through Adelaide Lead from Maryborough to Ararat, driven by Major Smith. He used to sound his horn as a signal as he drove through. The coach returned to Maryborough at 4 pm. Coaches ceased to run in 1876 with the opening of the rail line.

=== Gold Rush ===
Gold was officially first discovered at Adelaide Lead in December 1854. Adelaide Lead is close to Daisy Hill where a shepherd on Glenmona station had discovered gold in 1848 and sold it in Melbourne. The discovery gained media attention, but pastoralists tried to keep any finds quiet for fear of the impact on their runs. Gold was again discovered at Daisy Hill in June 1852 and brought many prospectors into the area.

A major gold rush to Maryborough occurred from June 1854, although some miners had been working in the area from the previous December. The population grew from 150 to 1,300 in that month, and from 7,000 to 20,000 in August 1854.

Three men, one of whom was William Howard, were camped on their way to the rush at Daisy Hill and found gold at Opossum Gully. As Howard came from Adelaide, he named the location Adelaide Lead.

The Adelaide Lead began as a rush of 60 diggers who pegged all of Opossum Gully. The lead was part of a long string of leads which stretched from north of Amherst through Opossum Gully in the south and via the Inkerman Lead to Alma, seven miles (11 km) to the north. The lead followed Timor Creek on the east side. There were two hotels – the Adelaide Hotel and the Junction Hotel – and a Camp was established in July 1855 under the control of Phillip Champion de Crespigny, the gold commissioner appointed to oversee the Amherst gold district.

The Adelaide Lead goldfields were just a small part of a huge goldfield with very significant yields and large numbers of miners following the latest gold discoveries. Adelaide Lead was never formally gazetted as a township, it was only a postal district. At that time there were several other gazetted townships close by such as Amherst and Alma.

The initial gold discoveries were alluvial and a series of new finds and rushes opened up over seven miles (11 km) of rich alluvial field from Daisy Hill to Alma. The depth of the main lead was 70 feet (21 m). New ground continued to be discovered throughout the 50s. In 1858 it was reported that up to 8 ounces of gold was recovered from a load of wash dirt (60 buckets). In March 1858 the Maryborough and District Advertiser reported that 9 oz of gold was gained from a load of wash dirt at Adelaide Lead. On 12 October 1858 a 22 oz nugget was reported as found at Adelaide Lead. A 25 oz nugget was found at Adelaide Lead in June 1862. In October 1869 a 160 oz nugget was found by Thomas Mole at a depth of 25 feet.

The population fluctuated enormously in the gold rushes and reached over 6,000 at one stage. Sometimes the population of the area was mainly Chinese diggers. In October 1855 there were three encampments of Chinese at Adelaide Lead, which were visited by Bernhard Smith, Acting Gold Receiver at Amherst, who had been made Protector to watch over the interests of the Chinese.

After the initial rush in 1855, numbers of miners at Adelaide Lead fluctuated and declined as the surface alluvial gold was exhausted. In 1860 the Croydon Reef was discovered and quartz mining commenced. The Croydon Reef mine yielded 26,000 oz of gold and the Federal Reef mine 5,000 oz. However, there were very few large deep lead mines in the area, unlike Talbot, Alma and Timor.

Prospectors remained in the district for many years, working the alluvial gullies and reefs. However, discovery of gold in Western Australia later in the nineteenth century saw some of these miners move west.

The lack of permanent water in the area was a problem for both miners and farmers who took up the small blocks of land. The Timor Creek only flowed after rain and residents depended on wells, tanks and small dams.

Black Douglas, a well known bushranger operating in the Black Forest who held up teamsters between the Bush Inn and Harpers Inn at Woodend in 1852, was caught at Adelaide Lead on Sunday 5 May 1855.

The Alma Riots in June 1855 started over a small dispute over a claim involving Vigilante English groups formed to deal with criminal gangs, and Irish diggers on the Adelaide Lead. A fight between the English and the Irish took place and the situation at Adelaide Lead became very tense. Warden Alexander Smith worked to pacify the antagonists, however Governor Charles Hotham ordered S de Vignoles SM with 50 police to the area and the parties were taken to court, as he feared that the dispute could become another Eureka rebellion.

A notorious robber, William Sydenham Smith, (alias William Turner, epithet Gipsy Smith) was arrested at Adelaide Lead in October 1856. He and his companions had a hideout in Coppernose Gully at Adelaide Lead. He was charged with the murder of a policeman and others and well as many robberies and hold-ups.

=== Railway ===
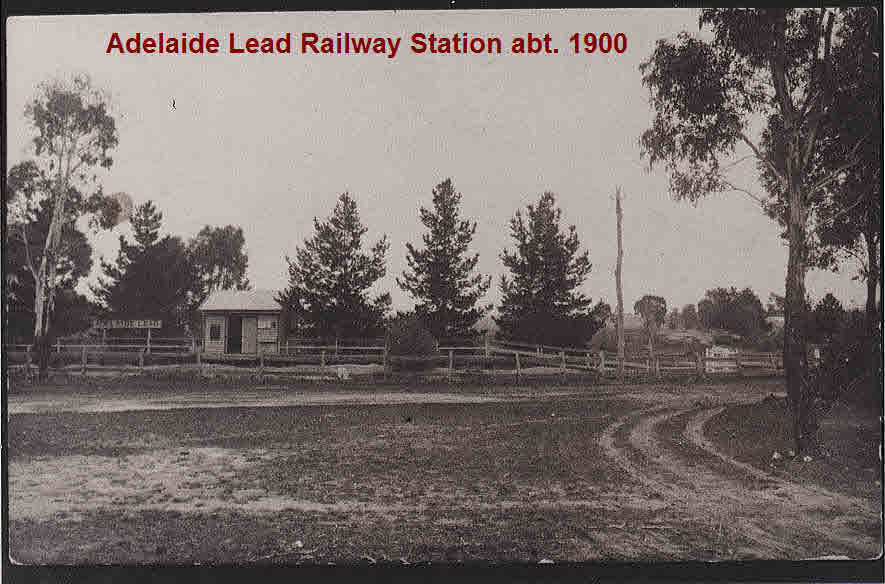
Adelaide Lead Railway Station about 1900

The Maryborough-Avoca railway line was completed on 28 October 1876, passing north of the settlement of Adelaide Lead. The Adelaide Lead station was opened in 1887. Initially there was one train each way daily. Later services were doubled but were reduced to daily services in World War 1 and reduced again in the 1930s. In 1936 mixed train services ceased and a passenger rail motor operated.

There was a gradual decline in passenger traffic in the 1950s as well as a decline in goods traffic. In 1955/6 Adelaide Lead railway station was closed to goods traffic and reduced in status to a rail motor stopping place. The rail motor service was withdrawn on 5 May 1957 and the line closed completely on 8 July 1959.

In 1961 Waterfall Quarries Pty Ltd opened a large quarry near the old Bung Bong station, quarrying grey basalt for railway ballast and a loop siding was laid to service the quarry. There were three trains daily from Bung Bong to Maryborough via Adelaide Lead until the Bung Bong quarry was closed in 1970.

The line was recommissioned through to Ararat in 1966 with the opening of Portland harbour for bulk grain handling, however subsequently the Avoca–Ararat section of the line has been unused for a number of years.

The line is to be reopened (as of 2017) as standard gauge and upgraded to 21-tonne axle loads, with insertion of over 100,000 new concrete sleepers. The second reopening of this cross country line is primarily to allow for the carriage of mineral sands from Manangatang to a processing plant at Hamilton. The reopening project includes the provision of a direct standard gauge connection between the Avoca and Hamilton lines at Ararat to avoid the need for trains to have to reverse at Ararat.

It was announced in June 2017 that work will begin to reopen the 87 km line between Maryborough and Ararat.

== See also ==
- Bung Bong
- Glenmona Bridge
- Pyrenees Highway, Victoria
