= Loddon River =

Loddon
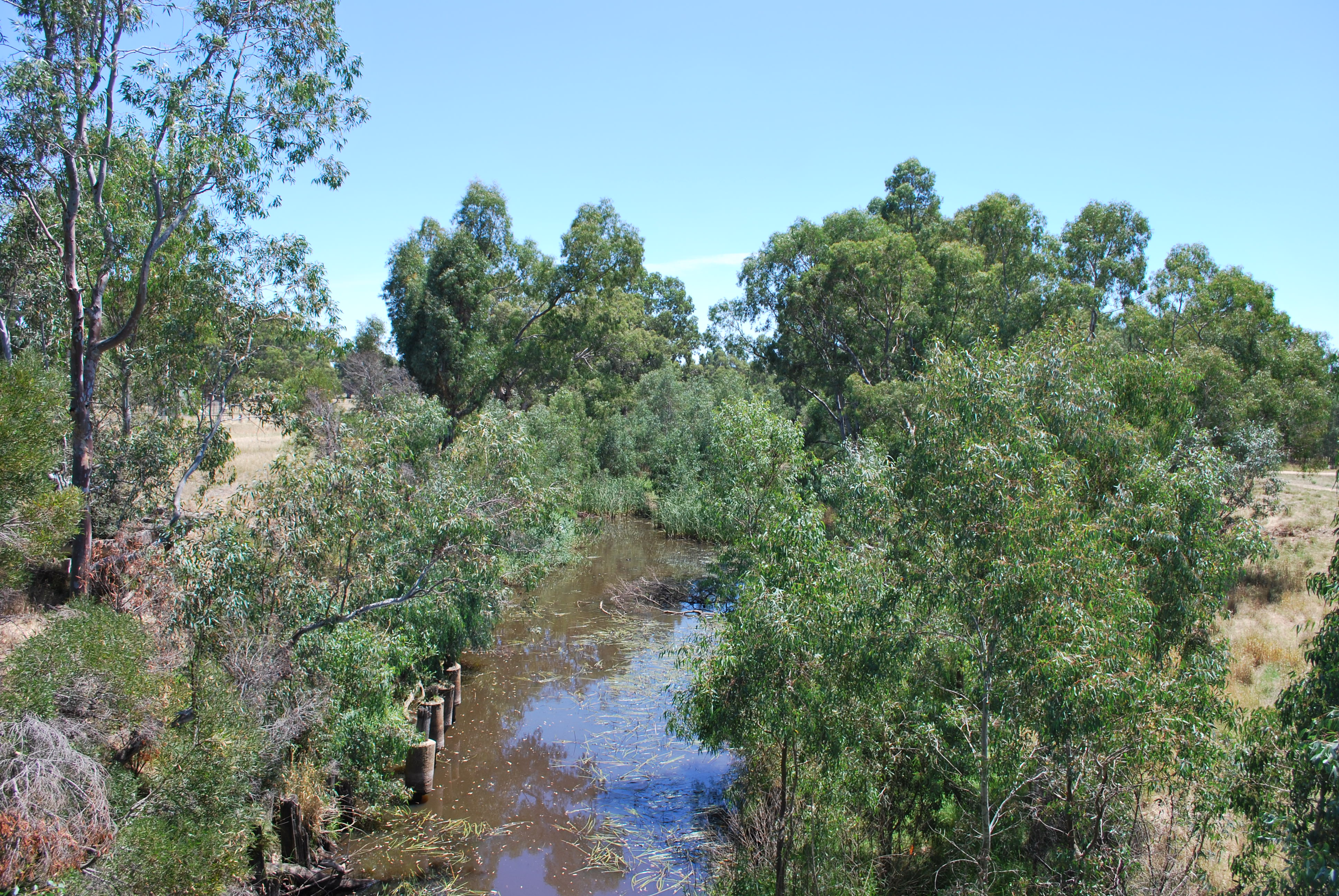
- Loddon River at Newstead

- Location of the Loddon River mouth in Victoria
- Etymology: After River Loddon
- Native name: Yolelerwil-meerin, Byerr (Aboriginal); Yarrayn, Minne-minne, Pullergil-yaluk, Gunbungwerro (Djadjawurrung); Woppoon (Wemba Wemba); Gunbungwerro, Mudyin gadjin (Barababaraba)

Location
- Country: Australia
- State: Victoria
- Region: Riverina bioregion (IBRA), Central Highlands, Loddon Mallee
- LGAs: Hepburn, Mount Alexander, Loddon, Gannawarra
- Towns: Newstead, Bridgewater, Serpentine, Kerang

Physical characteristics
- Source: Great Dividing Range
  - location: Musk
  - coordinates: 37°24′19.5″S 144°14′31.5″E
  - elevation: 638 m (2,093 ft)
- Mouth: Little Murray River
  - location: Kerang
  - coordinates: 35°33′4.7″S 143°53′0.5″E
  - elevation: 71 m (233 ft)
- Length: 392 km (244 mi)
- Basin size: 15,320 km^{2} (5,920 sq mi)
- Discharge
  - average: 8 m^{3}/s (280 cu ft/s)

Basin features
- River system: Murray-Darling basin
- Tributaries
  - left: Middleton Creek, Tarilta Creek, Larni Barramal Yaluk (Jim Crow Creek), Joyces Creek, Boundary Gully, Tullaroop Creek, Bet Bet Creek, Bullabul Creek, Hope Creek, Sheepwash Creek
  - right: Muckleford Creek, Bradford Creek, Little Creek (Loddon), Serpentine Creek, Sangus Creek, Twelve Mile Creek (Loddon), Bannacher Creek
- Nature reserve: Upper Loddon Flore Reserve

The Loddon River, an inland river of the north–central catchment, part of the Murray-Darling basin, is located in the lower Riverina bioregion and Central Highlands and Loddon Mallee regions of the Australian state of Victoria. The headwaters of the Loddon River rise on the northern slopes of the Great Dividing Range east of Daylesford and descend to flow north into the Little Murray River, near Swan Hill. The river is impounded by the Cairn Curran and Laanecoorie reservoirs.

== Location and features ==
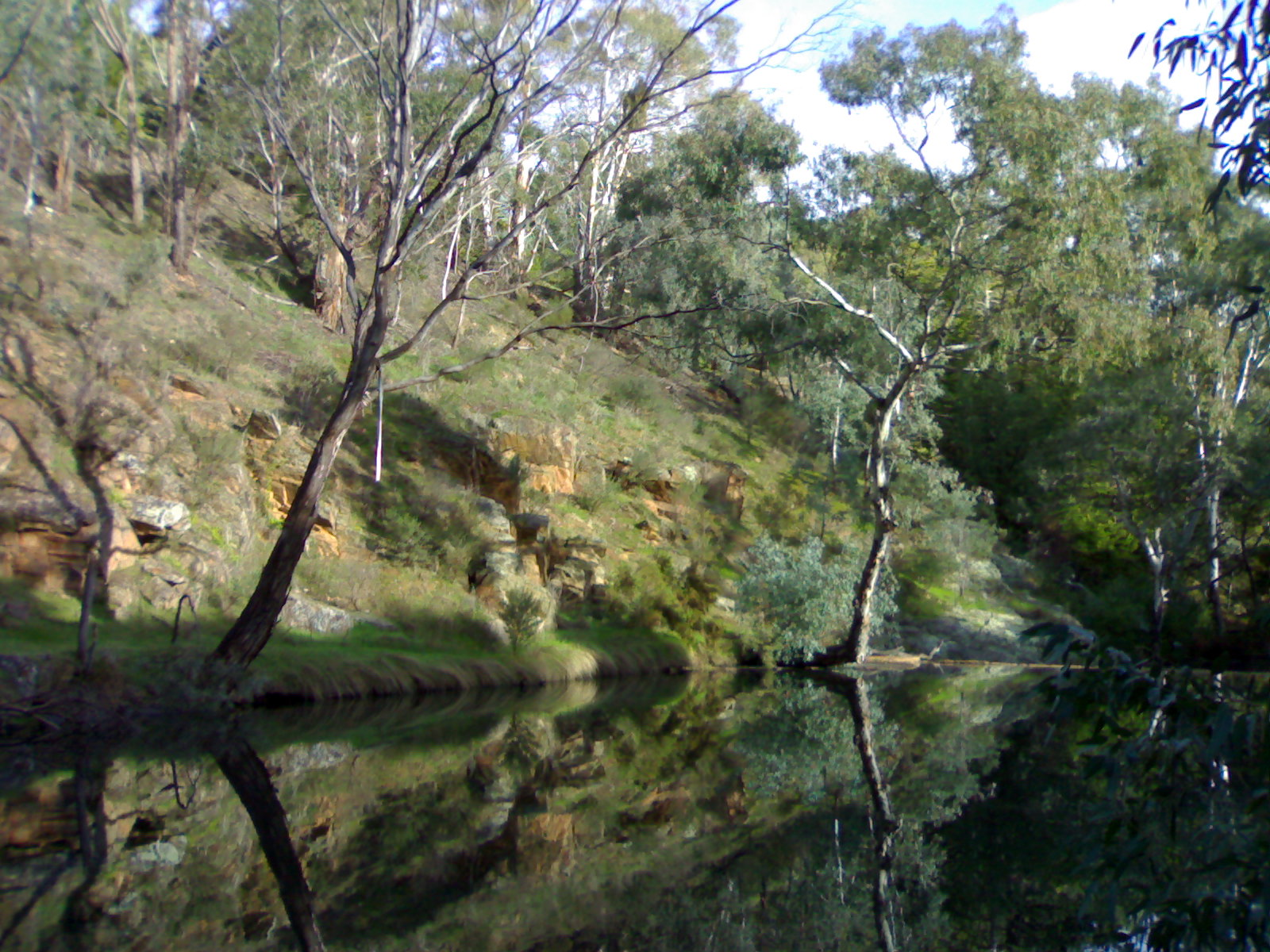
The Loddon River at Vaughan Springs

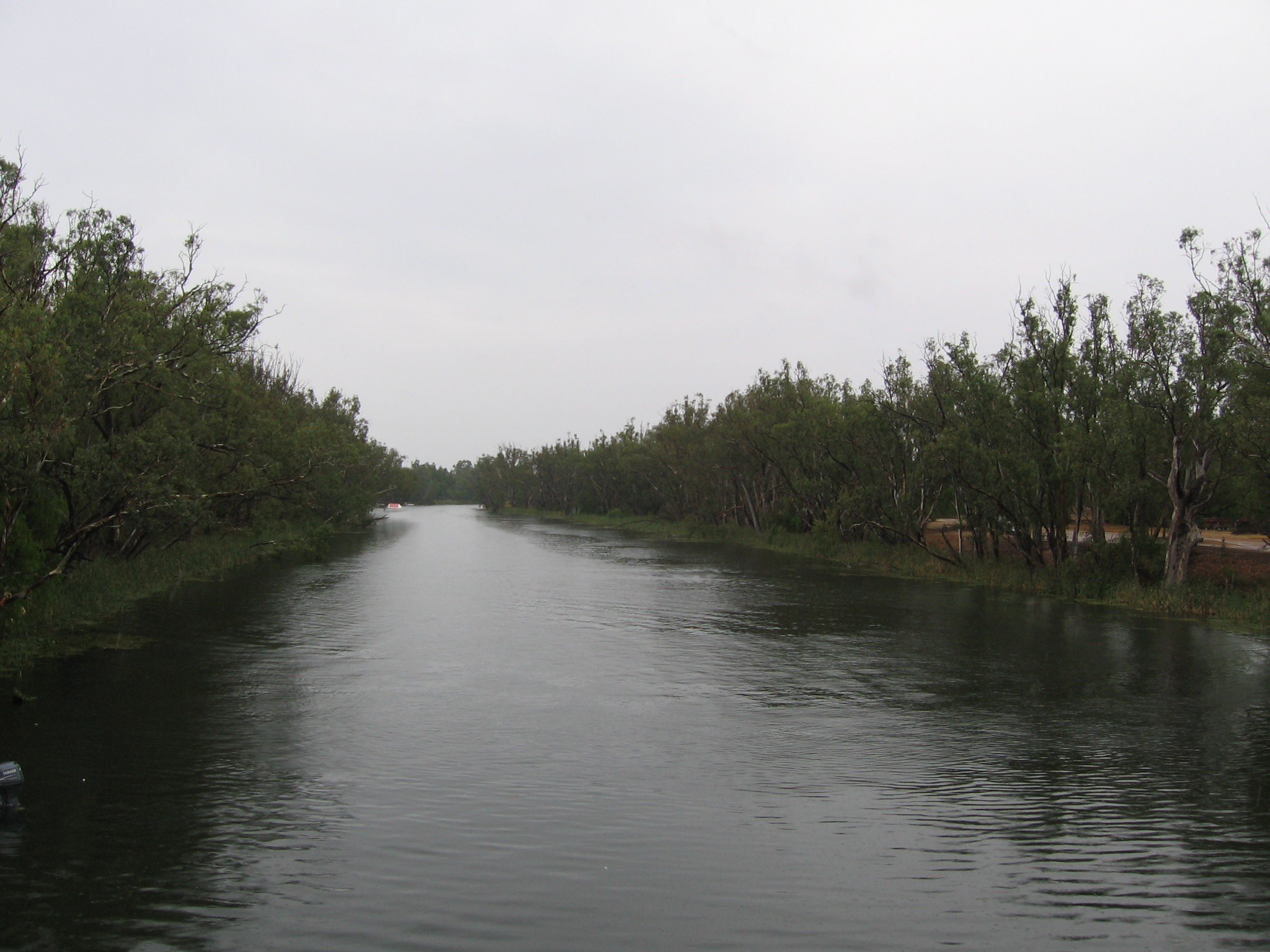
The Loddon River at Bridgewater

The Loddon River is the second longest river in Victoria after the Goulburn and, along with the Avoca River, drains a substantial part of central Victoria. From source to mouth, the river is joined by nineteen minor tributaries; and descends 567 metres (1,860 ft) over its 392-kilometre (244 mi) course.

An anabranch of the Loddon River may be found in the upper reaches of the river.

The river rises below Musk near Trentham and Lyonville from where it heads northward to Glenlyon and on to Loddon Falls. It then flows generally northward through Guildford and Newstead, 40 kilometres (25 mi) west of Bendigo. After Newstead the river flows into the Cairn Curran Reservoir (147,000 ML), before emerging at Baringhup and continuing north to Eddington. The Tullaroop Creek tributary, which joins just above Laanecoorie Reservoir, is impounded by the Tullaroop Reservoir (72,950ML).The river then flows into Laanecoorie Reservoir (12,000 ML) at Laanecoorie and then to Newbridge, where it flows due north to Bridgewater On Loddon, where waterskiing, swimming and fishing are popular recreational pursuits.

The river then passes Serpentine with high summer flows that commence at the small concrete weir to the Loddon Weir, also known as Fernihurst Weir. After the weir, water is diverted to the Waranga Western Channel. Downstream from Loddon Weir the river averages 7 to 14 metres (23 to 46 ft) wide, and up to 26 metres (85 ft) wide at certain points, with a bank height of around 3 metres (9.8 ft). Approximately 10 kilometres (6.2 mi) south of Kerang water flows are increased due to water entering from the Macorna Channel, and the higher flows are maintained for the next 15 kilometres (9.3 mi) of river up to the Kerang Weir. The final stretch of the river flows through saltbush and black box forest. The river ends at its confluence with the Little Murray River at Benjeroop, near Swan Hill.

=== Tributaries ===
Tributaries to the left of the river include:

- Middleton Creek
- Tarilta Creek
- Larni Barramal Yaluk (until 11 May 2023, Jim Crow Creek)
- Joyces Creek
- Boundary Gully
- Tullaroop Creek
- Bet Bet Creek
- Bullabul Creek
- Hope Creek
- Sheepwash Creek

Tributaries to the right of the river include:

- Muckleford Creek
- Bradford Creek
- Little Creek
- Serpentine Creek
- Sangus Creek
- Twelve Mile Creek
- Bannacher Creek

== River crossings ==
The river is crossed by the Daylesford-Malmsbury Road at Glenlyon; the Drummond-Vaughan Forest Road crosses the river at three locations and the Porcupine Ridge Road crosses near the Vaughan Springs area. Further river crossings are encountered at Kemps Bridge Road, the Midland Highway south of Guildford, as well as Punt Road and the Pyrenees Highway in Newstead. The river is crossed by the Baringhup Road, and subsequently by the Baringhup West-Eastville Road, Rumbolds Road, Pickerings Lane, Back Eddington Road and Bendigo-Maryborough Road at Eddington. At Laanecoorie, the river is crossed by the Janevale bridge, a reinforced concrete girder bridge built in 1911 which is listed as a Heritage Place in the Victorian Heritage Register, and then northwards to Newbridge where it is crossed by the Wimmera Highway. At Bridgewater the river is crossed by the Calder Highway and the Eaglehawk-Inglewood railway line. A further road crossing is encountered at Bridgewater-Serpentine Road, to the south of Serpentine.

Road crossings between Serpentine and Loddon weirs include Lagoona Road, Borung-Hurstwood Road, Ellerslie Road, Majors Line Road, Boort-Pyramid Road, Boort-Yando Road, Canary Island-Leaghur Road, Appin South Road, Hewitt Road and Wood Lane. In Kerang the river is crossed by the Old Kerang Road, Murray Valley Highway and the Yungera railway line. After Kerang the river is crossed by West Road, O'Donoghues Bridge Road, Baulch Road and the Wells Bridge which carries the Lake Charm Road.

== Naming ==
The Loddon River was named by Thomas Mitchell in 1836 after the River Loddon in the English counties of Berkshire and Hampshire.

As the river is relatively long, Aboriginal peoples from several cultural groups lived near the river course. In an undefined Aboriginal language, the names for the river are Yolelerwil-meerin and Byerr, both with no defined meaning. In the Djadjawurrung language, the names for the river are Yarrayn, Minne-minne and Pullergil-yaluk, all with no clearly defined meaning. In the Wembawemba language, the name for the river is Woppoon, with no clearly defined meaning. In the Djadjawurrung and the Barababaraba languages, the name for the river is Gunbungwerro, with werro and wurru meaning "lips" or "mouth". In the Gannawarra and Barababaraba languages, the name for the river is Mudyin gadjin, meaning "[he] picked up water".

== Recreational pursuits ==
When reasonable water levels flow, the Mill Rapid downstream of the Calder Hwy bridge provides technical whitewater kayaking of Grade 3 standard featuring a short fast run. Access is usually via local roads on the west bank. Upstream of the Calder Hwy bridge kayakers and canoeists will have a pleasant paddling experience but may have to share the river with swimmers, fishers, and waterskiers.

At Bridgewater there is a designated 3.2-kilometre (2.0 mi) general waterskiing area, a 950-metre (3,120 ft) slalom and ski jump area. Waterskiing events held in this area include the Australian Masters in January, the pre-Moomba tournament in February and the Bridgewater Ski Club Tournament. Additionally, a 90-metre (300 ft) swimming area is designated at the Flour Mill Weir.

Fish found between Bridgewater to Serpentine include Murray cod and golden perch. The water downstream from the Loddon Weir can range between 5 and 7 metres (16 and 23 ft) deep and provides fishing opportunities for redfin, golden perch, silver perch, carp and to a lesser extent Murray cod. A vertical slot fishway was constructed next to the Kerang Weir in 2008. The main fish species in the river's lower reaches are redfin, golden perch and Murray cod.

There are weirs in Bridgewater and Kerang to keep water in the towns, but otherwise the river can dry up in summer. There is current work going on to determine and implement suitable environmental flows in the river. The pool upstream of the Bridgewater weir is used for watersports such as waterskiing. Both reservoirs are also used for motor boats and sailing. At the Loddon Weir there is road access which enables boats to be launched from the bank.

== See also ==
- List of rivers of Australia § Victoria
