= Bung Bong =

Locality in Victoria, Australia

- Town
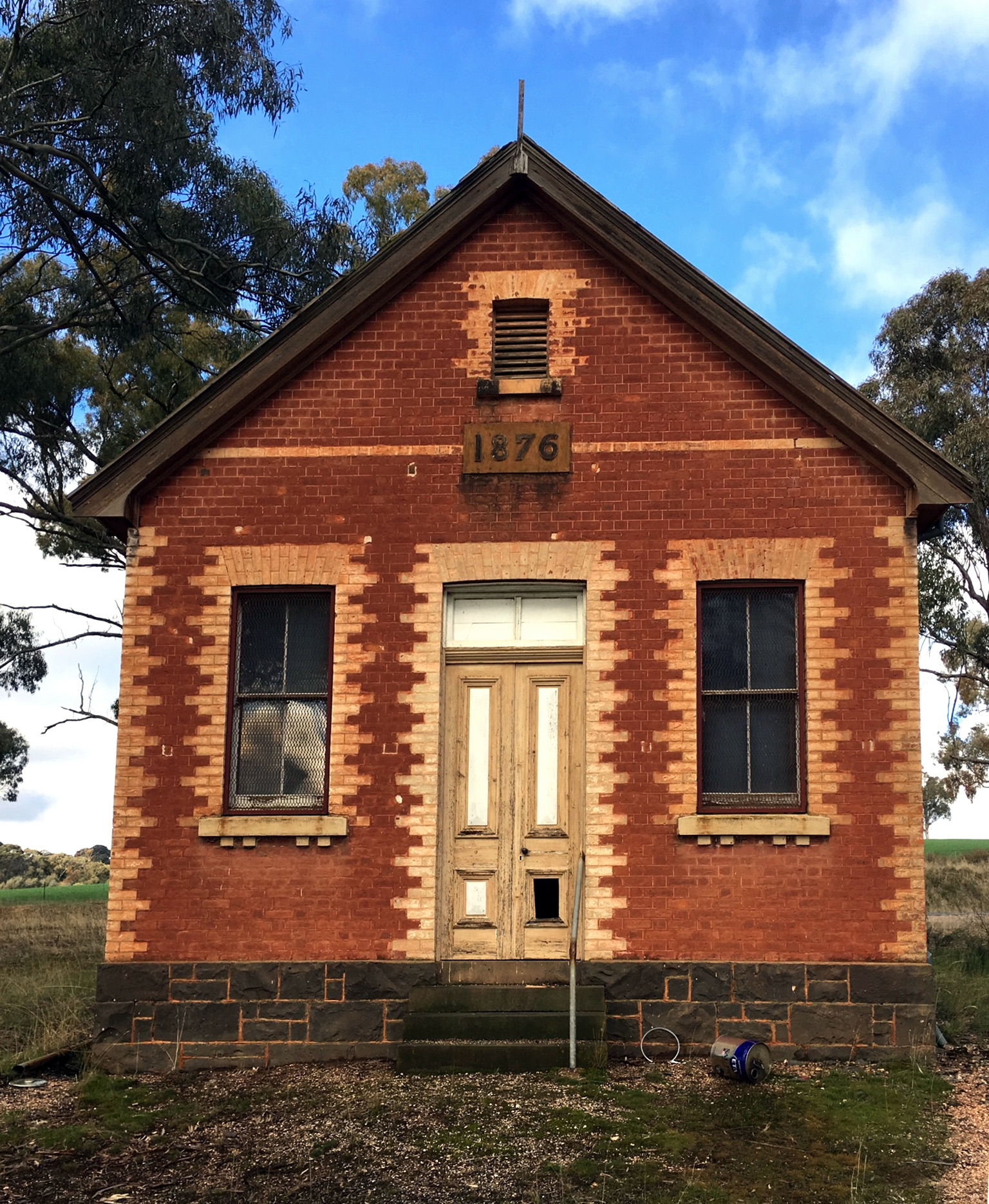
- The 1876 Temperance Hall / Church of England

- Coordinates: 37°06.203862′S 143°33.679002′E
- Country: Australia
- State: Victoria
- LGAs: Shire of Central Goldfields; Pyrenees Shire
- Location: 185 km (115 mi) NW of Melbourne; 70 km (43 mi) N of Ballarat; 19 km (12 mi) W of Maryborough; 10 km (6.2 mi) E of Avoca

Government
  - State electorate: Ripon
  - Federal division: Mallee

Population
  - Total: 63 (2021 census)
- Postcode: 3465

Bung Bong is a locality in Victoria between the towns of Avoca and Maryborough. The locality is divided, with the Western section in the Pyrenees Shire and the Eastern section in Shire of Central Goldfields. The Bet Bet Creek (which separates the two Shires) runs towards the north through the middle of the locality and then into the Loddon River. Bung Bong is located on the Pyrenees Highway.

Bung Bong is also a region.

== Etymology ==
The name Bung Bong may derive from the Aboriginal words for "swamp" or for "swamp grass".

== History ==
Bung Bong Post Office opened on 1 February 1864 and closed in 1961.

The old Glenmona Bridge was built over the Bet Bet Creek in 1871 and is the third oldest of its type in Victoria, (after the Hawthorn Bridge and the Redesdale Bridge). Its location is directly south of the new bridge over the Bet Bet on the Pyrenees Highway.

In 1878 the Bung Bong Farmers' Club held their first "ploughing match". There were 18 entries in the competition to plough, "virgin soil, of a rich chocolate colour". It was reported, "that although the ploughmen were new to competitive trials, they showed by the excellence of their work their fitness for their calling." For the 1886 (and ninth) ploughing match there were 22 entries. It was held on the Abbott property, half a mile from the Bung Bong railway station and "the attendance was large". This time, 10 entrants used double furrow ploughs with one entrant, "exhibiting Gilsman's patent rotary harrows, which attracted great attention, and were pronounced excellent implements".

Local volunteers have fought major bushfires in the region in December 1880, January 1881, January 1985 and the Black Saturday bushfires in 2009.

Bung Bong horse Richmond Lass won 31 races and went on to win the 1969 Inter Dominion Pacing Championship. The horse was owned by Fred Miller of Richmond House.

Gold has been extracted in the Bung Bong region and along the Bet Bet Creek. Commercial gold exploration resumed in 2018.

=== Railway ===
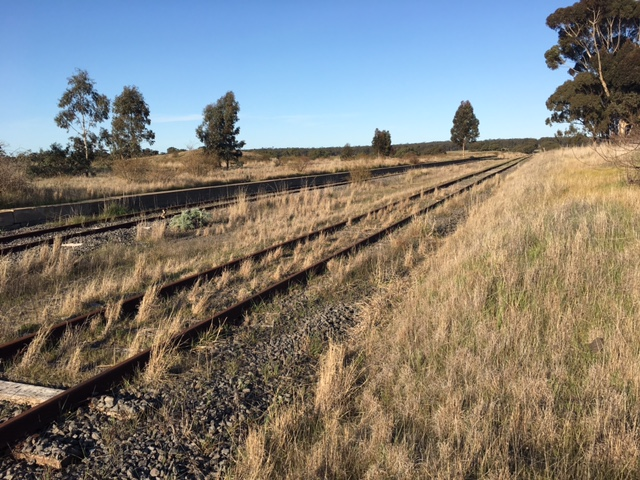
The disused Bung Bong railway station

Bung Bong is on the Avoca railway line, to the north of the locality, where ballast was loaded from nearby basalt quarries. There was a post office at the Bung Bong railway station which opened in October 1877 and closed in June 1940.

In 2017, there was a proposal to link Mildura to Portland with standard gauge track to carry grain and mineral sands. This upgrade would include the Maryborough to Ararat section of the line, past the site of the disused Bung Bong station. Community action has been successful in keeping a railway level crossing on a key arterial road open, after commencement of the new rail link.

The Avoca line was reopened in 2018 after being rebuilt as part of the Murray Basin Rail Project, which also extended the reach of the standard gauge network in Victoria.

=== Schools ===
There was a Primary School (No. 1056) at Bung Bong which operated on the same block as the Church of England between 1872 and 1921.

Approximately 5 km south of Bung Bong, on the Moore's Flat Road, is the now abandoned locality of Moore's Flat. There was a Moore's Flat Primary School (No. 1575).

=== Heritage buildings ===
The Pyrenees Shire Council has documented a number of significant properties in the Bung Bong - Homebush region in the Avoca Heritage Study: 1864 - 1994 - Volume 3.

== Region ==
Bung Bong is also a region, which has a large range of native flora and fauna. South-East of the locality is the Bung Bong Nature Conservation Reserve which is used by bush walkers and bird watchers.

== Facilities ==
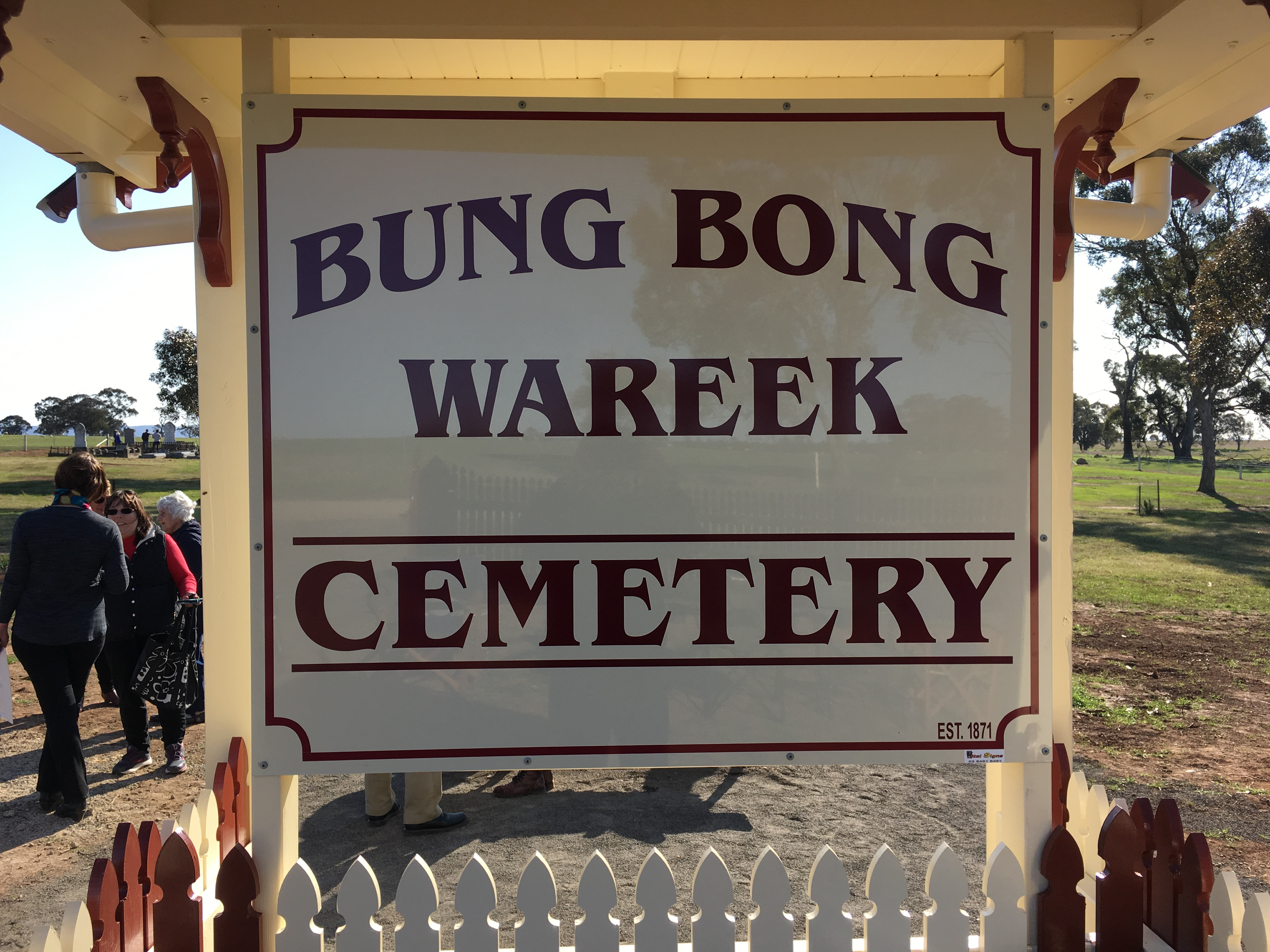
The Bung Bong, Wareek cemetery

=== Bung Bong, Wareek Cemetery ===
The cemetery is located on 413 Bung Bong-Rathscar Rd, Wareek. In 2017, it is being upgraded by the community with new fences and facilities.

Information on the interments, with more details and images of the headstones - here.

=== Hall ===
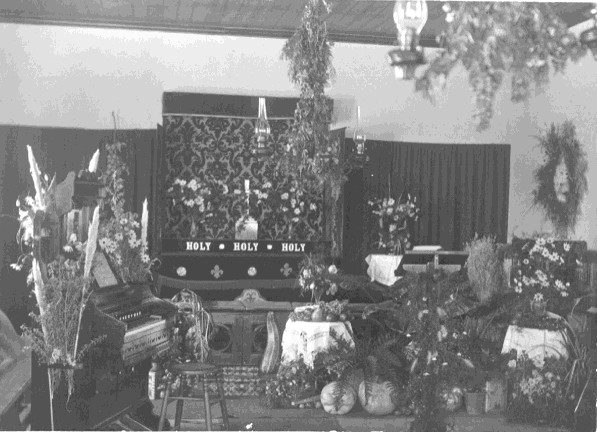
Interior of the Church of England - Harvest Festival

The Bung Bong Temperance Hall was established by the Independent Order of Rechabites as 'Tent' 138. It is located on the Pyrenees Highway.

It was built in 1876 on land donated by Mr Miller and was used for community activities including meetings of the 'Farmers Club'.

The building was subsequently used as the Bung Bong Church of England. While the building is now unused, the site has become a popular stopping place for caravans.

At the Wareek Hall there is an honour roll of those from the Bung Bong district who fought in World War I. It contains 19 names.

== See also ==
- Adelaide Lead, Victoria
- Ararat, Victoria
- Glenmona Bridge
- Homebush, Victoria
- Homebush railway station, Victoria
- List of localities in the Shire of Central Goldfields
- List of locations in the Shire of Pyrenees
- Lamplough, Victoria
- Pyrenees Highway, Victoria
- Rathscar, Victoria
- Richmond Lass
- Wareek, Victoria
