= Bet Bet Creek =

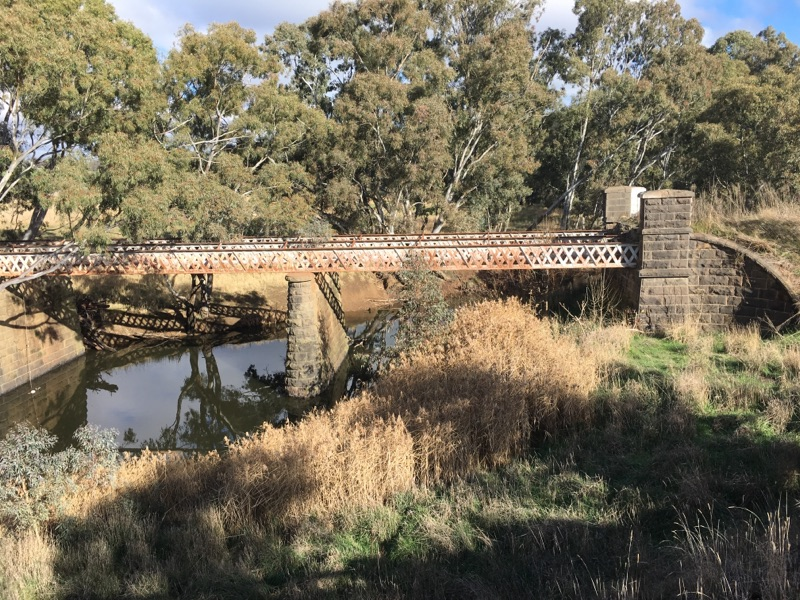
- Bet Bet Creek at Bung Bong
- Etymology: Place of red ochre (Aboriginal)

Physical characteristics
- Source
  - location: Ben Major, Victoria
  - coordinates: 37.27014°S 143.43736°E
  - elevation: 479m
- Mouth
  - location: Laanecoorie Reservoir
  - coordinates: 36.836°S 143.889°E
  - elevation: 166m
- Length: 87.8 km (54.6 mi)

Bet Bet Creek in west Victoria starts below Ben Major, Victoria (west of Lexton) at an elevation of 479m and ends at an elevation of 165m flowing into the Loddon River at the Laanecoorie Reservoir. The Bet Bet Creek drops around 314m over its 87.8 km length and ultimately contributes to the Murray River system. The six creeks flowing into the Bet Bet Creek are: Moina Creek (at 272m), Doctors Creek (at 264m), Caralulup Creek (at 253m), Timor Creek (at 190m), Carmanuel Creek (at 180m) and the Burnt Creek (at 177m).

The Shire of Bet Bet was a Victorian local government area located about 180 kilometres (110 mi) northwest of Melbourne.

== Locations ==
=== Places ===
Bung Bong, Victoria is located at the boundary of the Pyrenees Shire and the Shire of Central Goldfields which are separated by the Bet Bet Creek. Timor, Victoria is located on the Bet Bet Creek with the nearby "Bridge Inn".

=== Areas bounded ===
The Electoral district of Avoca, as defined by the 1858 Electoral Act was bounded in-part by the Bet Bet Creek. The County of Gladstone is bounded by the Bet Bet Creek to the east. The now abolished Electoral district of Maldon was bounded in-part by the Bet Bet Creek. The Electoral district of Talbot from 1856 to 1859, was bounded on the west by the Bet Bet Creek. The now abolished Electoral district of Maryborough (Victoria) was bounded in-part by the Bet Bet Creek.

== Hydrology ==
Stored salts have been liberated, predominantly due to erosion, into the upper tributaries of the catchment and these have accumulated lower down in the creek. This has degraded the water quality flowing into the Laanecoorie Reservoir. Early gold mining has produced some degradation of the creek environment.

== Major floods ==
There was significant flooding of the creek in 1860, 1870 and 1935.

== Significant bridges ==
Two historically notable bridges over the Bet Bet Creek are the Glenmona Bridge and Danns Bridge.

== See also ==
- Adelaide Lead, Victoria
- Ben Major Grevillea - which grows at the 'Ben Major' Conservation Park - with 'Ben Major' being the source of the Bet Bet Creek
- Glenmona Bridge, over the Bet Bet Creek
- List of rivers of Australia
