= Richmond Lass =

Australian Standardbred racehorse

- Richmond Lass winning the 1969 Inter Dominion Pacing Championship
- Sire: Aachen
- Dam: Chevro
- Sex: Mare
- Foaled: 1 September 1963
- Died: 14 January 1985 (aged 21)
- Owner: Fred Miller, Richmond House, Coordinates 37°06′49.5″S 143°34′41.7″E

Record
- Winner of the 1969 Inter Dominion Pacing Championship

Earnings
- $42,936

Major wins
- 31

Richmond Lass won 31 races as a harness racer and went on to win the 1969 Inter Dominion Pacing Championship. The horse was owned by Fred Miller, from Richmond House, Bung Bong, Victoria and driven by "respected local horseman Jack Moore."

== Richmond L'Ami ==
Richmond L'Ami winning the Boort Cup, 30 January 1982

Richmond L'Ami (with L'Ami being French for 'friend') a bay horse was born on 14 November 1975. The dam was Richmond Lass and the sire, Tarport Boy. Richmond L'Ami - a pacer - won a number of races including the Boort Cup on 30 January 1982.

== Death ==
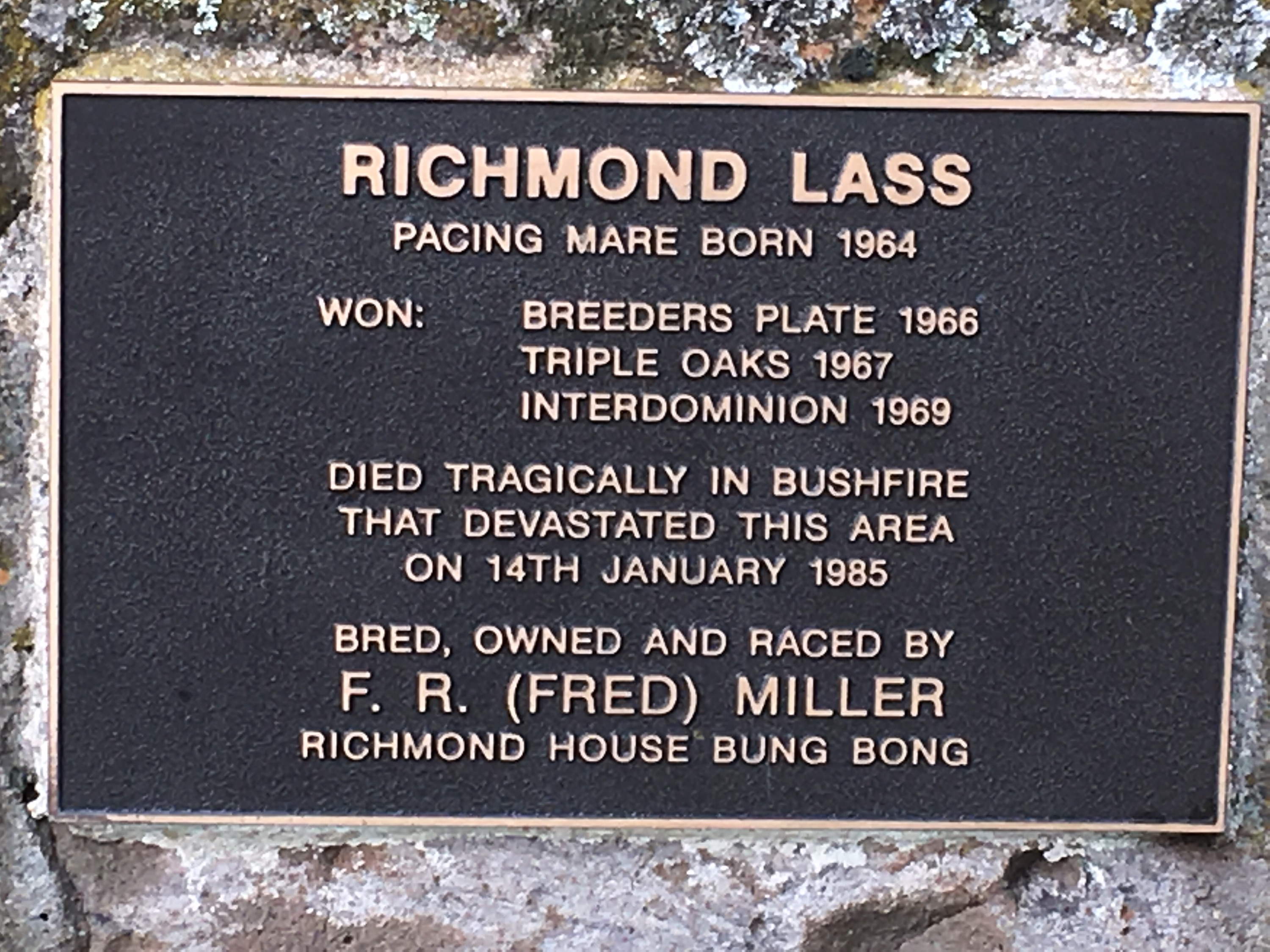
Richmond Lass Plaque at Richmond House

Richmond Lass died at Richmond Park, in a major bush-fire, at Bung Bong, on 14 January 1985. There a memorial plaque erected at Richmond House.

== Hall of Fame ==
In August 2017, Richmond Lass was inducted into the Victorian Harness Racing's, Hall of Fame as "one of Australia’s finest pacing mares".

== Memorial race ==
The Harness Breeders VIC Richmond Lass race, has been "named in honour of one of the best mares produced in the southern hemisphere" with $30,000 prize money, and is held annually at Melton Entertainment Park.

Further information on Richmond Lass is available from Australian Harness Racing.

== See also ==
- Bung Bong, Victoria
- Harness racing in Australia
- Harness racing in New Zealand
- Inter Dominion Hall of Fame
- Rathscar, Victoria
