= Glenmona Bridge =

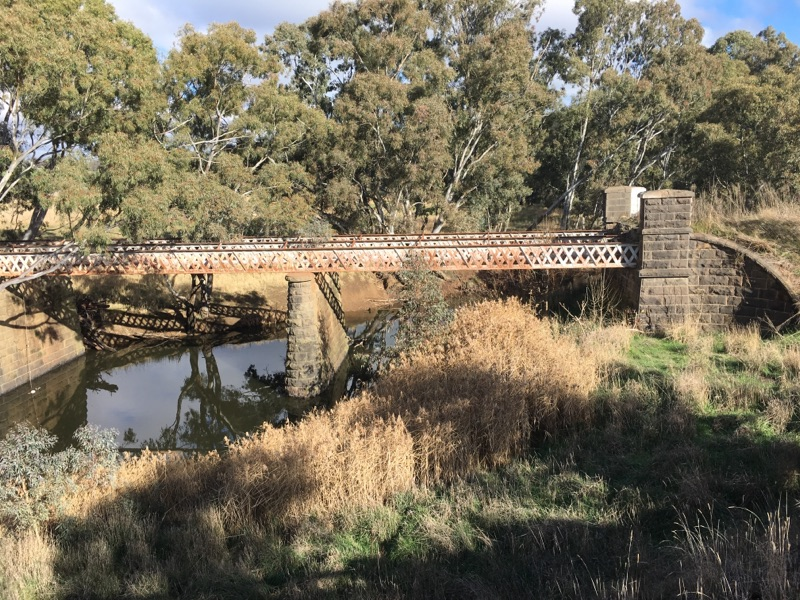
- Glenmona Bridge in 2017
- Coordinates: 37°06.203862′S 143°33.679002′E
- Carries: The old Pyrenees Highway alignment
- Crosses: Bet Bet Creek
- Locale: Bung Bong, Victoria, Australia

Characteristics
- Design: Wrought Iron continuous lattice-girder deck-truss
- Total length: 46.6 metres (152 ft 11 in)
- Width: 6.1 metres (20 ft 0 in)
- Longest span: 26 metres (85 ft 4 in)

History
- Opened: 1871

Location
- Interactive map of Glenmona Bridge

Glenmona Bridge is a riveted wrought iron lattice-girder deck-truss road bridge on the old route between the Ararat and central goldfields over the Bet Bet Creek at Bung Bong, Victoria.

== History ==
The bridge was built in 1871 to replace an 1857 timber bridge that was destroyed in the statewide floods of 1870. Those super-floods devastated much of the state's road network, and resulted in a redesign of many river and creek crossings, to raise the roads above flood levels not seen before.

The continuous trusses are 46.6 metres long and the piers are quite tall at 10.1 metres high. It is the third-oldest of its type in Victoria. Its location is directly south of the new bridge over the Bet Bet on the Pyrenees Highway.

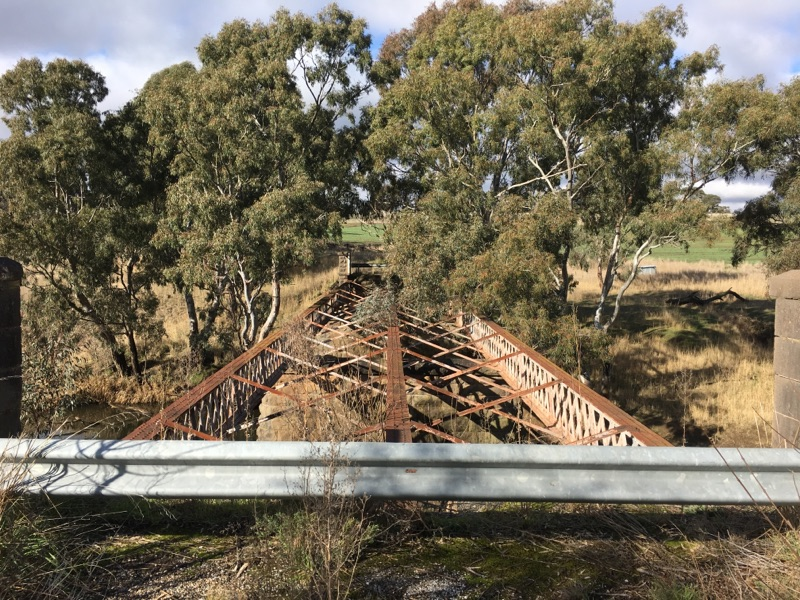
The damage to the timber decking after the 1985 fire

The timber deck and handrails were destroyed in a bushfire on 14 January 1985.

=== Similar bridge ===
Whereas the huge lattice truss girders of the Redesdale Bridge in Redesdale, Victoria, had been imported from England in 1859, colonial engineering works had, in the meantime, developed to service reef and deep lead mining, and were quite capable of supplying such products for the Glenmona bridge, by 1870.

== Significance ==
The bridge is registered on the Victorian Heritage Council database and with the National Trust of Australia. and the Shire of Pyrenees heritage overlay.

The Pyrenees Shire Council has documented the Glenmona Park homestead on Glenmona Road, Bung Bong, at the Bet Bet Creek, in the Avoca Heritage Study: 1864 - 1994 - Volume 3.

== See also ==
- Adelaide Lead, Victoria
- Ararat, Victoria
- Bung Bong, Victoria
- Pyrenees Highway, Victoria
- Redesdale Bridge
