= Homebush, Victoria =

Homebush
- Town
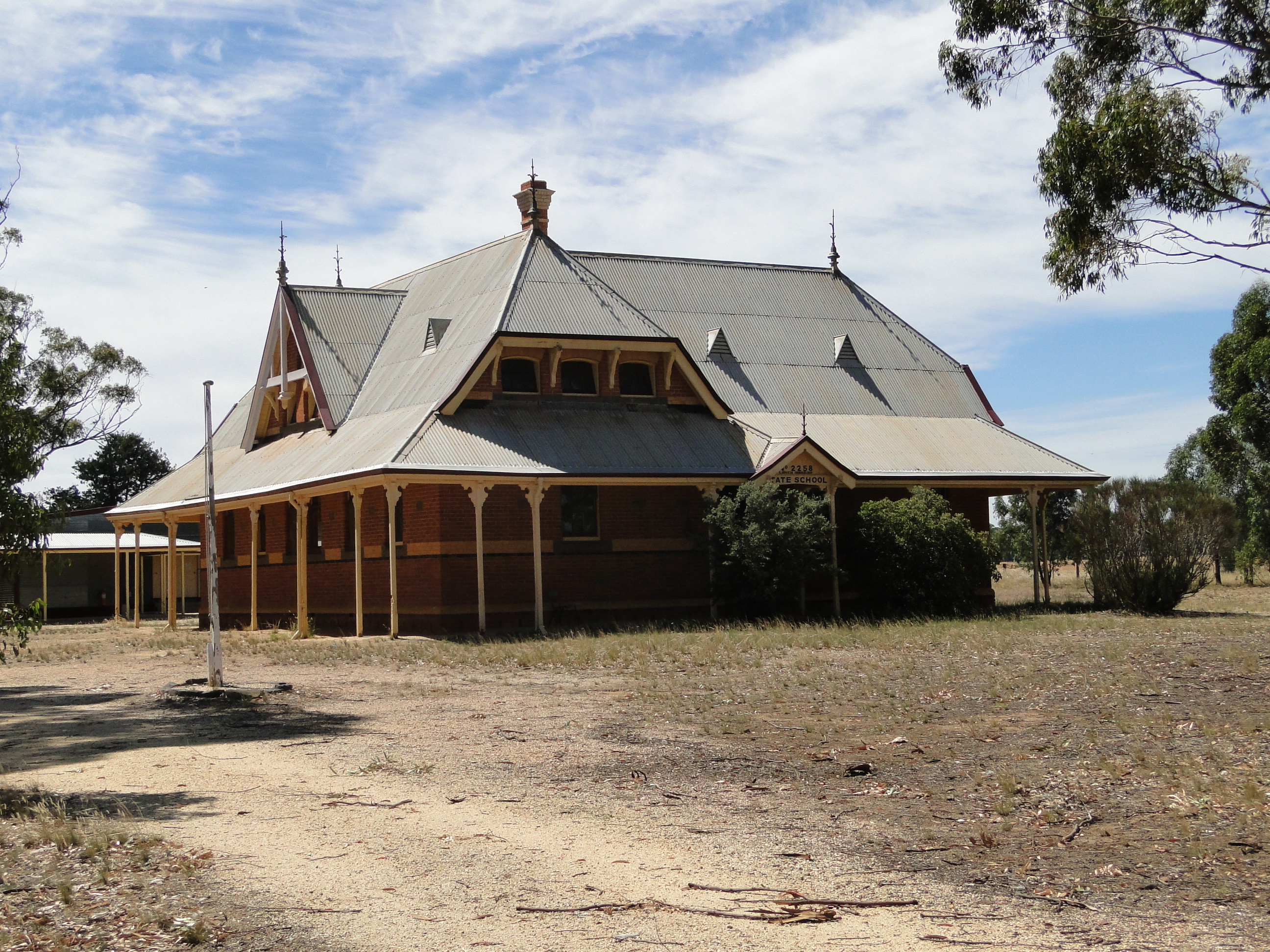
- Lower Homebush Primary School

- Coordinates: 37°03′S 143°31′E
- Country: Australia
- State: Victoria
- LGA: Pyrenees Shire
- Location: 191 km (119 mi) NW of Melbourne; 76 km (47 mi) N of Ballarat; 18 km (11 mi) W of Maryborough; 10 km (6.2 mi) E of Avoca
- Established: 1853

Government
  - State electorate: Ripon
  - Federal division: Mallee

Population
  - Total: 31 (SAL 2021)
- Postcode: 3465

Homebush is a locality 10 kilometres (6 mi) from Avoca in central Victoria, Australia. It is located within the Pyrenees Shire.

== History ==
=== 1850 - 1880 ===
First settled in 1853 after a rush to a rich claim nearby, the town reached the height of its prosperity in the 1880s. But Homebush owed its existence entirely to the mines: when the gold ran out and the mines closed the town rapidly declined and died. All that remains of a once-flourishing community is a school building and some mullock heaps.

Planned development began in June 1860 when, following a second rush to the diggings, Homebush was surveyed and its streets laid out. Homebush Post Office opened on 1 October 1863 (closing in 1944).

An Office of Lands and Survey map shows the Township of Homebush ( Coordinates 37.0559341°S 143.5293448°E ) as it was in January 1863. The map shows, the land subdivisions, some buildings and the location of the Star Hotel and the Wesleyan Chapel.

Three churches were built, and within little more than a decade. The town opened its railway station, homebush railway station. By 1884 Homebush was firmly established as a business centre, with two agents, a bootmaker, a butcher, two carpenters, two contractors, nine farmers, a gardener, a registrar, a station master, a storekeeper, and a teacher. Lower Homebush, three miles away, where the commercial life of the town had moved closer to some deep-lead mines, had a blacksmith, two bootmakers, a carpenter, a draper, an engineer, two farmers, three hotels, two mining managers, and twelve stores.

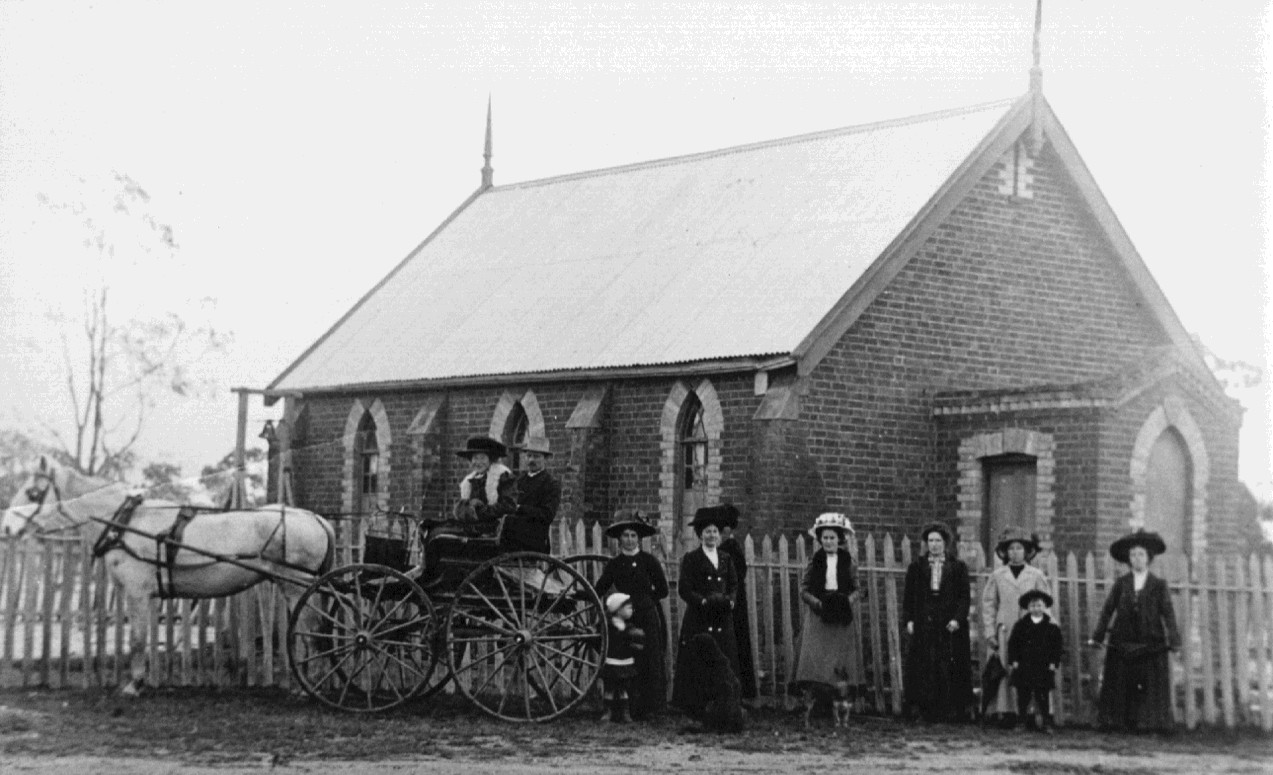
The 1872, Methodist Church / Wesleyan Chapel, Upper Homebush

The Methodist Church / Wesleyan Chapel was built in 1872. As the town declined, in 1928 the church was dismantled and moved 6 km to Rathscar West.

=== 1880 - 1930 ===
In 1883 Vale's Reef mine, one of the district's largest, closed for lack of capital, and over the next decade many other companies also ceased operations. In 1889 hopes revived when the Madame Hopkins Company was formed with a large investment of capital to work an untried deep-lead to the east of Homebush, but this new company was not successful.

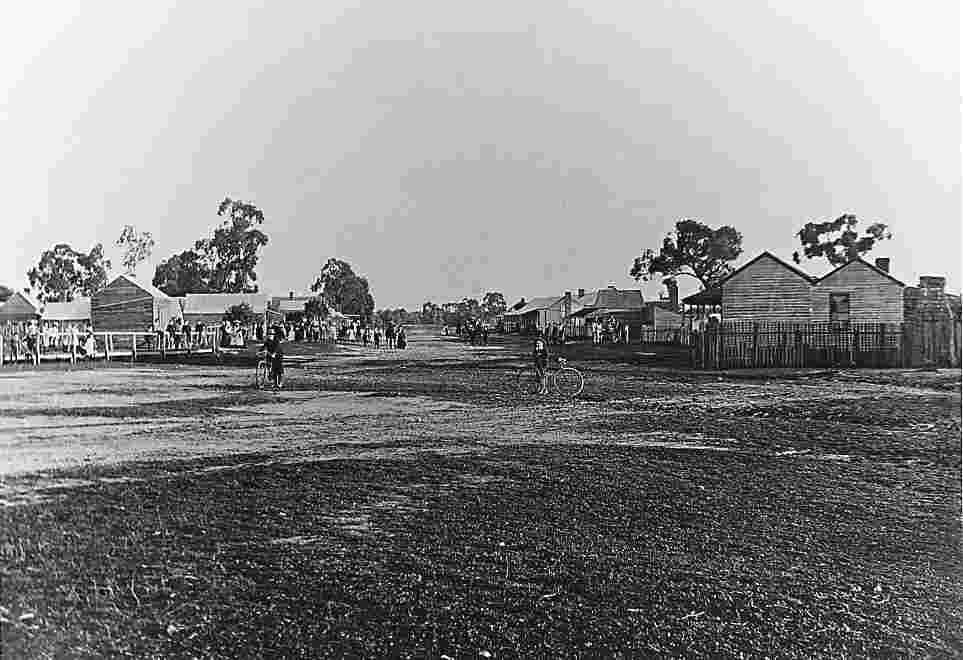
Lower Homebush Main Street as it appeared in the 1890s

In 1909 the Excelsior Company opened in Homebush and reputedly yielded rich returns from relatively small quantities of quartz, but by 1920 all large-scale gold mining activity in Avoca shire had ended. The combined population of Homebush and Homebush Lower had fallen to only 150, a huge decline from its peak of 14,000 during the rushes. Businesses closed and buildings were dismantled.

== Schools ==
The rise and decline of Homebush and Lower Homebush can be seen in the history of its schools. In 1861 a Church of England school opened, with classes held in a rented building. Over the next two decades the number of students increased to more than two hundred and two more schools were built, one at Homebush, with another, even bigger, at Lower Homebush - the Lower Homebush Primary School. ( Coordinates 37.0298153°S 143.5269012°E ) But by 1903 the average attendance at the Lower Homebush school was only forty. Gold yields had dropped and mining companies had ceased operating. Homebush School closed permanently in 1908. Lower Homebush School had small enrolments from the 1930s, and by 1967 it too had closed. By then the Homebush School had long gone.

The Pyrenees Shire Council has documented the history of the Lower Homebush Primary School, in the Avoca Heritage Study: 1864 - 1994 - Volume 3.

== See also ==
- Australian gold rushes
- Bung Bong, Victoria
- Homebush railway station, Victoria
- Rathscar, Victoria
- Wareek, Victoria
