= Lamplough, Victoria =

Lamplough
- Town
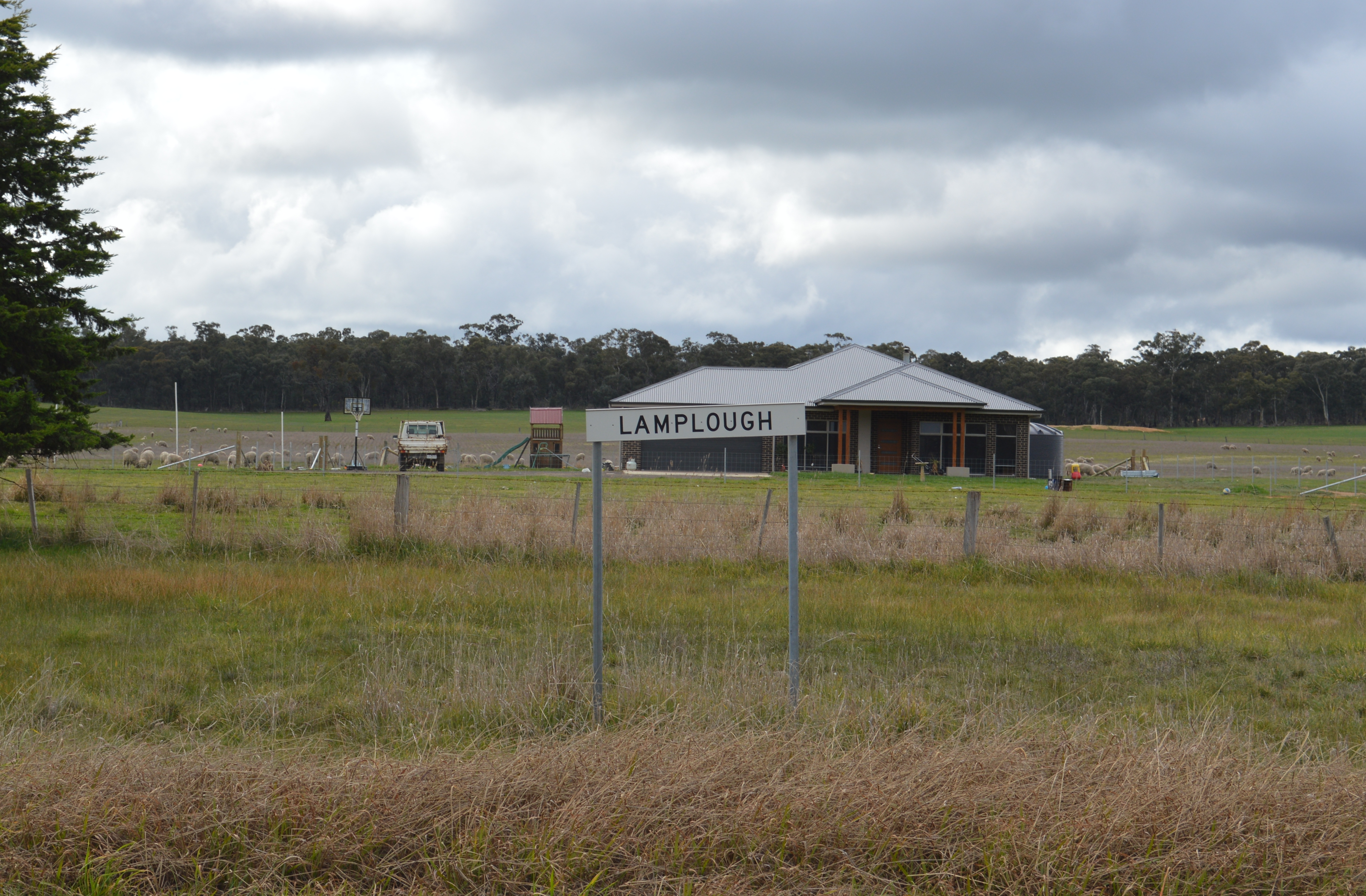
- Town sign at Lamplough

- Coordinates: 37°08′S 143°30′E
- Country: Australia
- State: Victoria
- LGA: Pyrenees Shire
- Established: 1859

Government
  - State electorate: Ripon
  - Federal division: Mallee

Population
  - Total: 49 (SAL 2021)
- Postcode: 3352

Lamplough is a locality near Avoca, Victoria in Australia. It was the site of a gold rush from November 1859 and up to 16,000 people were on the site. The lead was worked for a distance of nearly 3 miles (5 km) to the point where it ran into the water and was abandoned.

== Gold history ==
In August 1859, the Mining Surveyor at Maryborough reported Lamplough as a "grand attraction; hundreds of miners are arriving daily from the more remote gold-fields. The yield of gold, together with the large extent of the already proven auriferous ground, indicates that the Lamplough presents every appearance of being the largest rush we have yet had in Victoria."

In January 1860, the surveyor reported that "Lamplough may safely be classed amongst the permanent and payable gold fields of Victoria". He did note that the field was overpopulated, particularly by those in business pursuits: "there appears to be nearly one place of business to each miner’s tent". In March 1860, the surveyor reported: "Lamplough, during the last few weeks, presents the appearance of one of the settled gold fields. The late departures to the Inglewood rush have materially improved its condition by withdrawing a portion of its surplus population, such as unsuccessful miners, storekeepers, &c. It may safely be presumed that those now remaining are all making at least a good livelihood".

In June 1860 he reported: "At Lamplough, the Deep Lead (with the exception of minor rushes in the immediate neighbourhood) offers sufficient inducements to remain. The lead appears still to adhere (as originally) to the southern reef, neither do the workings get into deeper or wet ground. It has been found payable more than two miles in length from the original prospectors’ claim, and three claims in width, the average yield being an ounce to the load, with one foot thickness of wash-dirt".

July 1860: "The Lamplough Deep Lead is steadily progressing. Several other shallow workings upon adjacent hills, and many of the neighbouring gullies, are being prosecuted; but, from what I can ascertain, are only attended with wages results. The population at Lamplough is rather on the increase, principally from Inglewood. A new rush occurred a few days ago about eight miles from Lamplough, on the Lexton road; but in the absence of any payable ground (except the prospectors) having been discovered, it has nearly subsided again".

September 1860: "At Lamplough I cannot note any material change in mining since my last. Several of the small rushes in the immediate vicinity appear to give remunerative employment to a large number of miners whilst water for washing purposes is easily obtained; but in the absence of any natural or artificial means for securing it in this dry part of the district, and that when the present supply is exhausted, I predict a considerable decrease in their numbers will result".

In November 1860: "Lamplough (with occasional small rushes, either to the deep lead or to the immediate vicinity) still retains its population."

In January 1861, the report was quite different: "The population at the new diggings (Mountain Creek) is yet daily increasing, and from the fact of payable ground having already been found extending over a large area, together with new discoveries of frequent occurrence, .... Lamplough, and all the other sections of my division (in consequence of this rush), are now quite denuded of their European alluvial mining population".

In March 1864, 160 alluvial miners were reported to be working at Lamplough of a total of 1,605 miners working within the Avoca Division. This number remained fairly steady until the end of 1866 and in 1867 shrunk to 70 miners. In 1869, a company was mining in the area.

=== Next gold rush ===
The next rush was to Moonambel, then known as Mountain Creek at the end of the Pyrenees Ranges, north of Avoca. Other miners moved to Kiandra, New South Wales and to New Zealand where there is a Lamplough Lead just north of Hokitika.

== Post office ==
Lamplough Post Office opened on 1 January 1860 and closed in 1970.

== Significant events ==
The Avoca and District Historical Society has documented the Lamplough rush and people recorded in the vicinity at the time.

== See also ==
- Australian gold rushes
- Avoca, Victoria
- Bung Bong
