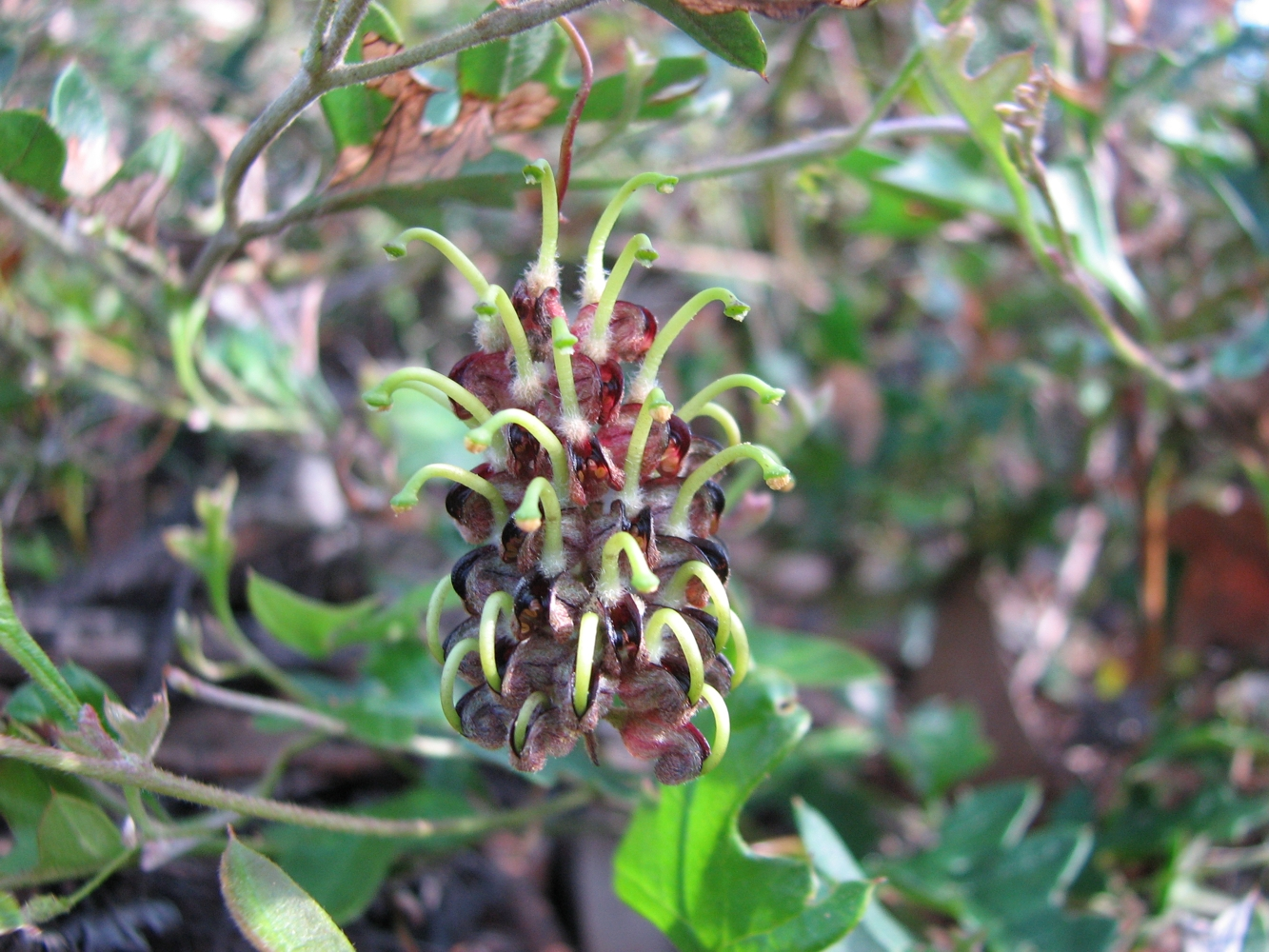
- In Ben Major Conservation Park

Conservation status
- Vulnerable (EPBC Act)

Scientific classification
- Kingdom: Plantae
- Clade: Embryophytes
- Clade: Tracheophytes
- Clade: Spermatophytes
- Clade: Angiosperms
- Clade: Eudicots
- Order: Proteales
- Family: Proteaceae
- Genus: Grevillea
- Species: G. floripendula

Binomial name
- Grevillea floripendula R.V.Sm.

= Grevillea floripendula =

Ben Major grevillea

Species of shrub endemic to Victoria, Australia

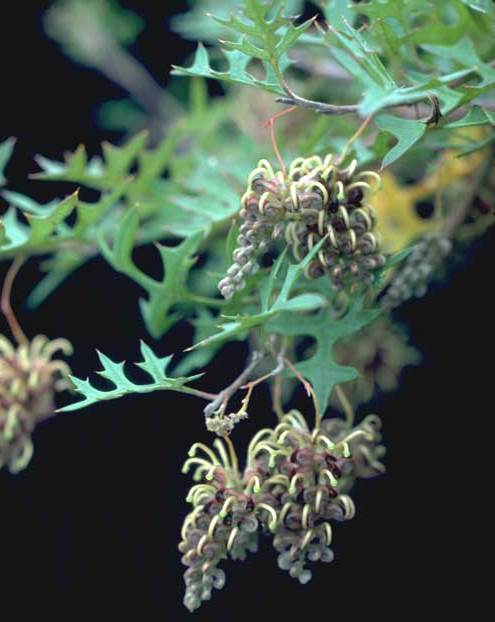
Leaves

Grevillea floripendula, commonly known as Ben Major grevillea or drooping grevillea, is a species of flowering plant in the family Proteaceae and is endemic to a restricted area of Victoria, Australia. It is a spreading, low-lying to prostrate shrub with divided leaves with toothed lobes and clusters of greenish to mauve and blackish flowers with a yellow to red style.

== Description ==
Grevillea floripendula is a spreading, low-lying to prostrate shrub, typically 0.3–1 m (1 ft 0 in – 3 ft 3 in) high and 1.5–3 mm (0.059–0.118 in) wide, its branchlets covered with shaggy hairs. Its leaves are divided, 20–65 mm (0.79–2.56 in) long and 15–40 mm (0.59–1.57 in) wide with mostly five to nine egg-shaped lobes 10–20 mm (0.39–0.79 in) long and 5–15 mm (0.20–0.59 in) wide, these usually with two to six pointed teeth ending in a short, rigid prickle. The edges of the leaves are turned down and the lower surface has a few curly hairs. The flowers are arranged on the ends of branches, usually in pendulous clusters 30–55 mm (1.2–2.2 in) long on a peduncle 20–30 mm (0.79–1.18 in) long. The flowers are greenish to mauve, silky-hairy, mauve to blackish on the inside, the pistil 13.5–16 mm (0.53–0.63 in) long. Flowering occurs from October to December and the fruit is a hairy follicle 9–11 mm (0.35–0.43 in) long.

== Taxonomy ==
Grevillea floripendula was first formally described in 1981 by Raymond Vaughan Smith in the journal Muelleria from specimens he collected in the Ben Major Forest Reserve north of Beaufort in 1976.

== Distribution and habitat ==
Ben Major grevillea grows in open forest within a localised area to the north of Beaufort between Waterloo and Ben Major Forest.

== Conservation status ==
Grevillea floripendula is listed as vulnerable under the Australian Government Environment Protection and Biodiversity Conservation Act and critically endangered in Victoria under the Flora and Fauna Guarantee Act 1988 and a National Recovery Plan has been prepared. In 1997 about 4000 plants remained in its native range, in 21 separate populations. The main threats to the species include weed invasion, habitat loss and disturbance, and frequent bushfires.

== See also ==
- List of Grevillea species
