= Michael James Laracy =

New Zealand trade unionist (1871–1952)

Michael James Laracy (20 October 1871 – 25 April 1952) was a New Zealand shearer and trade unionist. He was born in Avoca, Victoria, Australia on 20 October 1871.
