= Bridgewater, Victoria =

Bridgewater
- Town
- Coordinates: 36°37′5″S 143°56′42″E
- Country: Australia
- State: Victoria
- LGA: Shire of Loddon

Government
  - State electorate: Ripon
  - Federal division: Mallee

Population
  - Total: 133 (2021 census)
- Postcode: 3516

Bridgewater is a locality in the Shire of Loddon, Victoria, Australia. At the 2021 census, Bridgewater had a population of 133.

The locality completely surrounds the town of Bridgewater On Loddon, but they are separate localities.
