= Avoca, Victoria =

Avoca
- Town
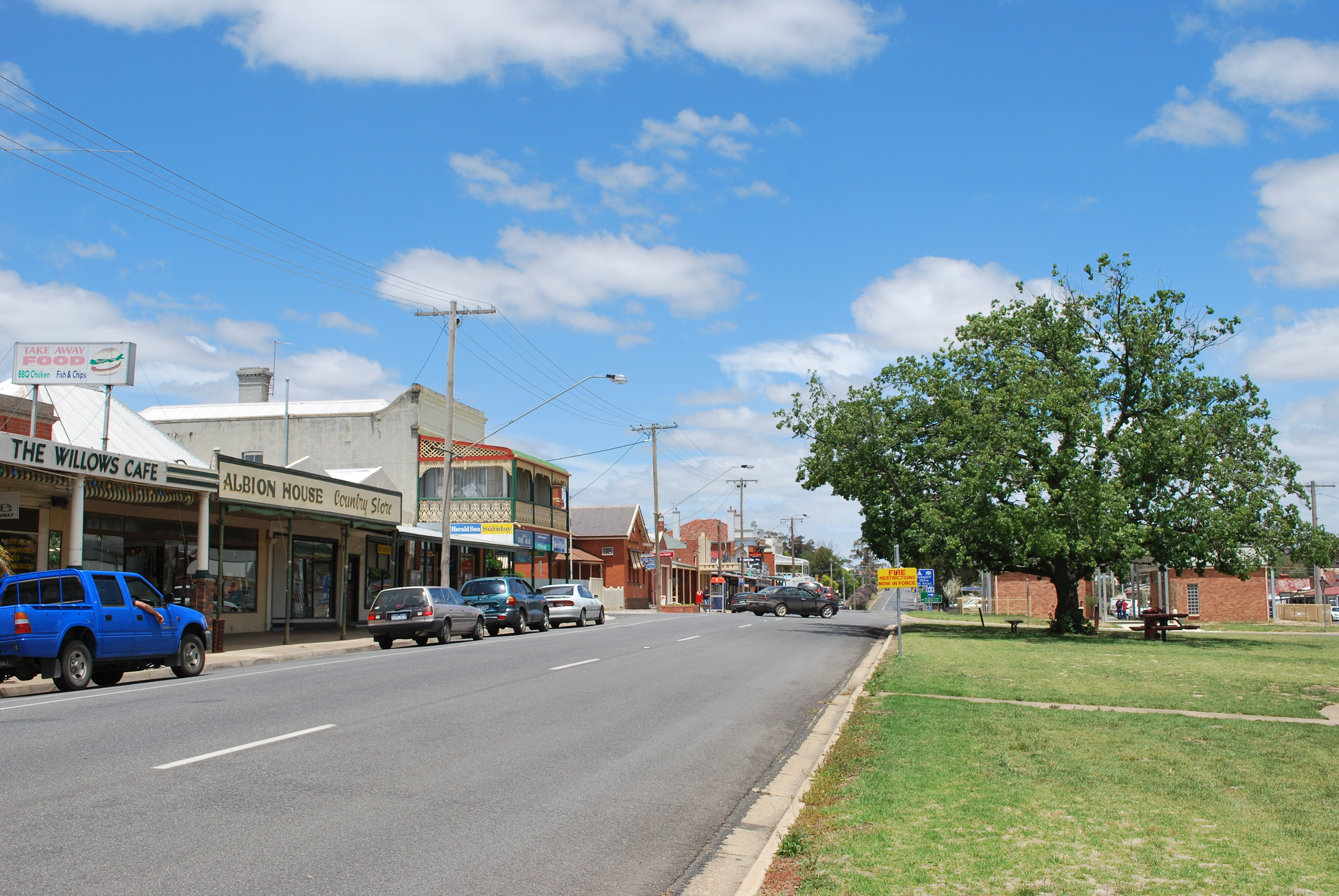
- Main street of Avoca

- Coordinates: 37°05′17″S 143°28′26″E
- Country: Australia
- State: Victoria
- LGA: Pyrenees Shire
- Location: 183 km (114 mi) from Melbourne; 95 km (59 mi) from Bendigo; 71 km (44 mi) from Ballarat; 26 km (16 mi) from Maryborough

Government
  - State electorate: Ripon
  - Federal division: Mallee
- Elevation: 242 m (794 ft)

Population
  - Total: 1,129 (2021 census)
- Postcode: 3467
- Mean max temp: 20.3 °C (68.5 °F)
- Mean min temp: 7.4 °C (45.3 °F)
- Annual rainfall: 525.8 mm (20.70 in)

Avoca /əˈvoʊkə/ is a town in the Central Highlands of Victoria, Australia, 71 kilometres (44 mi) north west of Ballarat. It is one of two main towns in the Pyrenees Shire, the other being Beaufort to the south.

== Geography ==
The town stands in the gently undulating basin of the Avoca River, which rises in the Pyrenees Ranges to the west. To the south, the region is bounded by low hills of the Great Dividing Range; eastwards, the basin ends in a dry forested rise; to the north the Avoca River runs slowly through the plains of the Wimmera before joining Lake Bael Bael and the lake and swamps just south of the Murray. The town and river were named after Avoca, the village and River Avoca in County Wicklow, Ireland.

The region takes in an area of about 200 square kilometres (77 sq mi), and includes the towns of Redbank, Natte Yallock, Rathscar, Bung Bong, Lamplough, Amphitheatre, Percydale, Moonambel, and Warrenmang. A few miles to the northeast, bare paddocks mark the site of Homebush, once a flourishing mining village.

Avoca has many small businesses servicing the local community including a pub, several cafes, a chemist, convenience store, a butcher, a supermarket, its own newspaper (Pyrenees Advocate) and a community bank. Since the 1970s, the wine industry has grown to be one of the most significant economic drivers and the sector is now the largest employer in the region and has increased tourism.

== History ==
=== Early European settlement and the gold rush ===
The explorer and surveyor Thomas Mitchell was the first European recorded to have travelled through the Avoca district. He found the area more temperate in climate and better watered than inland New South Wales, and he encouraged settlers to take up land in what he described as "Australia Felix".

The Blood Hole massacre occurred at Middle Creek, near Glengower at the end of 1839 or early 1840 killing an unknown number of Dja Dja Wurrung people.

By 1850 there were several large sheep runs, and pastoral settlement was well established.

Like Ballarat and many other Victorian towns, Avoca sprang into being suddenly in the 1850s with the discovery of gold. Gold was first found in Victoria in 1849 in the Pyrenees Ranges near Avoca. But it was not for another two years that the first discovery of any importance took place. In 1851 a shepherd called James Esmond found gold at Clunes, 40 kilometres (25 mi) from present-day Avoca, setting off a gold rush to the region. In 1853 gold was found at Four Mile Flat, near Avoca, and the main lead at Avoca itself was opened up a few months later.

By the beginning of December 1853, the population had increased from 100 to 2,200, and by June the following year, Avoca, with a population of 16,000, was regarded as one of Victoria's more important gold rush districts.

With a Court, a police station, Post Office (opened 1 September 1854), gold wardens, churches, and schools, Avoca had established itself as an administrative centre. This was a crucial development in its survival as a town, for when the gold miners left their Avoca claims to travel to the new Dunolly rush in 1856, Avoca continued to serve as the focus of the region's commercial and administrative life. With the Lamplough rush in 1859, miners returned to the Avoca district, and in that year rich deposits were also opened up at Homebush, established on the site of the 1853 Four Mile Flat rush. This discovery brought renewed activity to the district. The value of gold mining to the economy of the area may be seen in a single statistic: from 1859 to 1870 gold worth £2,500,000 was sent from Avoca to Melbourne. (Even this huge sum may represent as little as one third of the gold won as private sales were not included.) On 16 April 1889, gold mining ceased in Avoca with the closure of the Golden Stream Company mine. All that is visible today of the Golden Stream Mine is several large mullock heaps of mainly white pipeclay on the west side of the Sunraysia Highway between the railway crossing and the Avoca Cemetery.

=== From mining to agriculture and pastoralism ===
Avoca's economic basis was shifting rapidly from gold mining to agriculture. Many of the miners who had rushed the area in the 1850s and early 1860s settled and took up land. The big pastoral runs that had existed before the rushes were broken up for closer settlement. In addition to running sheep, several vineyards were planted from the late 1850s onward. Mining continued to be an important source of employment, but for the last decades of the nineteenth century most miners no longer worked individually or in small teams except for a small number of larger companies still working deep leads. Homebush, about ten kilometres from Avoca, was based almost entirely on company mines and flourished for several decades before these mines became uneconomical. Rural Victoria was hit particularly by the depression and drought of the 1890s. From 1895 the larger mines in the Avoca district closed and at the outbreak of World War I very few companies were still in operation. The downturn also affected agriculture in general with the last vineyard ceasing activity in 1929.

Across Australia rural productivity was rising, partly through the development of agricultural machinery by implement makers such as Mackay and Shearer. Some rural areas in 1901 recorded five times the harvest yields of the 1890s, at a small fraction of the cost.

In the first decade of the twentieth century Avoca's infrastructure was further developed. More and better roads were being built, the Shire Engineer attributed the problem of bad roads to heavier traffic from increased cultivation of land and more produce being brought to market. In 1911 the Sugarloaf reservoir was opened, and in the same year the district was linked to the rest of the State by telephone.

The Avoca Magistrates' Court closed on 1 April 1979, not having been visited by a Magistrate since 1971.

== The town today ==
=== Avoca Soldiers' Memorial ===
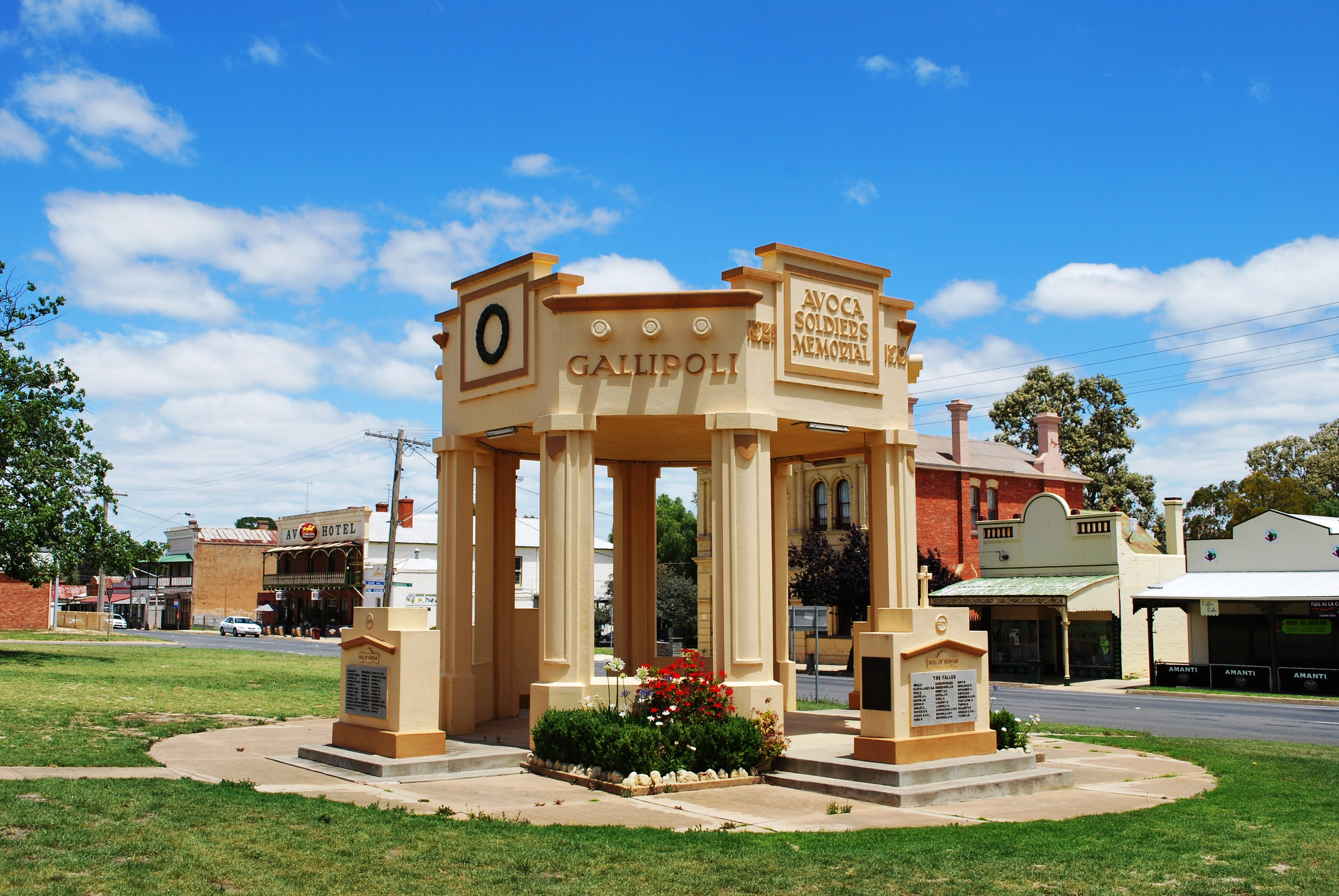
The Avoca Soldiers' Memorial

The Avoca Soldiers' Memorial is prominent in the park in the centre of the High Street. The war memorial often features on souvenirs of Avoca and could be said to be the symbol of the town.

The memorial was built in 1921. Since early in the First World War there had been a desire in the community to honour the men from the district who had enlisted. Finally in 1920 it was decided to hold a "Back to Avoca" celebration the next year and for the memorial to be opened at this time.

The memorial cost £1,100. Most monuments in Victoria and New South Wales cost between £100 and £1000, one in five between £1000 and £2000, and a few more than that. (It has been estimated that £100 in the 1920s was roughly equivalent to A$8000 in 1998.) Avoca, too small to be allocated a gun for a war trophy, built a monument on a scale suitable for the largest twenty per cent of communities. Having not built a band rotunda to date, it appears that the community may have used the opportunity of erecting the memorial to overcome this deficiency in the town's furnishings.

The Avoca memorial, which was initially conceived as a band rotunda, is an irregular octagon with eight piers carrying a roof obscured by a parapet. A frieze above the columns contains the names of the main areas where volunteers from Avoca fought: Gallipoli, France, Palestine and Belgium. Low walls on four sides each have a soldier's helmet and pack sculptured in high relief. The entrances on the other sides are guarded by free-standing granite tablets, inscribed with the names of soldiers from the district who fought in the First World War. The tablet on the northern side of the memorial records the names of those who died. The memorial is based on a classical model but with few references to classical detailing.

=== Cemetery ===
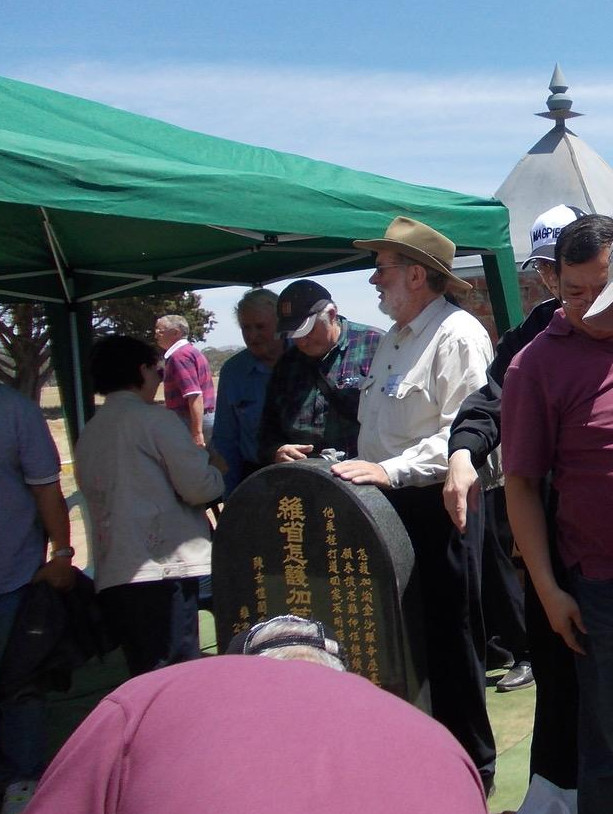
Avoca Cemetery - Official opening of the Chinese Memorial

The cemetery is located at 247 Sunraysia Highway Avoca Vic 3467. ( Coordinates 37.0688486°S 143.4664033°E ) Information on the interments, with more details and images of the headstones - here. The Avoca and District Historical Society Inc has erected a Memorial Wall in the old section of the Avoca Cemetery, to enable memorialisation of early citizens of the district buried in unmarked graves. Early in 2012 the Chinese Memorial Foundation in Melbourne sought permission to erect a memorial in the Avoca Cemetery in honour of their fellow countrymen who died in the area. This memorial was unveiled at a ceremony conducted on 23 November 2012.

=== Chinese Garden ===
Local business in conjunction with the Pyrenees Shire and Victorian government constructed a Chinese Garden in 2014. The Avoca Chinese Garden was named the Garden of Fire and Water by artist Lindy Lee. This contemporary Chinese garden represents the important contribution of Chinese people in the culture, those who came from China as immigrants and those Australians whose parents or grandparents came from China.

=== Churches ===
There are 5 current churches and 1 former church in Avoca.

=== Population ===
At the 2016 census, Avoca had a population of 1,193. 82.6% of people were born in Australia and 90.5% of people only spoke English at home. The most common responses for religion were No Religion 35.9% and Anglican 22.2%.

=== Sport ===
The town has an Australian rules football team competing in the Maryborough Castlemaine District Football League, the Avoca Bulldogs. Avoca have played in this league since 2005. They played in the Lexton Football League from 1944 until 1999. Then played with the Lexton Plains Football League until 2004 which was a merger of the Lexton Football League and the Western Plains Football League. The Avoca Football Club was formed in 1872.

Avoca has a horse racing club, the Avoca Shire Turf Club, which hosts several race meetings throughout the year. Best known are the ANZAC Races on Anzac Day every year and The Avoca Cup meeting in October.

Golfers play at the Avoca Golf Club on Davey Street.

Avoca has had a number of Australian Football League. players over the years. The most notable being Jim Jess who played 223 games for Richmond Football Club and playing in the 1980 Premiership. Jim Jess also represented Victoria on five occasions and was an All Australian representative. Ex-Collingwood and Sydney Swans player Darren Jolly also has ties with Avoca.

Avoca also hosts a wide range of other sporting events including mountain and road cycling events, running events and car rallies that profit from the natural beauty, space and support from local business and local government.

=== Tourism ===
Tourism is important for Avoca. The Avoca region is home to an established agricultural and winery industry thanks to its Mediterranean climate, good soil and running streams. The Tourist Information Office provides a pamphlet outlining a walking tour of the town's historic buildings which lists around 40 separate destinations.

=== Transport ===
The town is located at the intersection the Sunraysia Highway and the Pyrenees Highway. It was once served by a railway station, until it was closed in 1979. Freight traffic ceased in 2005. Subsequently, the railway from Ararat to Maryborough was closed for conversion to standard gauge.

In 2017, there is a proposal entitled the, Murray Basin rail project designed to link Mildura to Portland with standard gauge track to carry grain and mineral sands on the now disused Avoca railway line. This upgrading will include the Maryborough to Ararat section of the line, past the site of the disused station.

=== Water supply ===
Today's Avoca town water supply is largely dependent upon the "Bung Bong Bore" which was originally installed in an attempt to overcome flooding of deep lead mine shafts at Caralulup.

=== Wineries ===
In the late twentieth century viticulture was re-established and wine and tourism are now of significant economic importance to the region. Avoca is regarded as the gateway to the Pyrenees wine region. 1963 saw the rebirth with government ministers attending the official planting ceremony. While wineries extend from near Waubra in the south to St Arnaud in the north, Avoca is considered the epicentre of the wine region.

== Climate ==
The Bureau of Meteorology maintains temperature and rainfall statistics for Avoca, showing it has a mean maximum temperature of 20.3 °C or 68.5 °F and an annual rainfall of 537.5 millimetres or 21.2 inches.

Climate data for Avoca (Post Office), 1884- (temperature statistics 1965-1975)
| Month | Jan | Feb | Mar | Apr | May | Jun | Jul | Aug | Sep | Oct | Nov | Dec | Year |
|---|---|---|---|---|---|---|---|---|---|---|---|---|---|
| Record high °C (°F) | 43.6 (110.5) | 40.8 (105.4) | 37.4 (99.3) | 31.2 (88.2) | 25.4 (77.7) | 18.9 (66.0) | 22.0 (71.6) | 20.6 (69.1) | 28.3 (82.9) | 34.3 (93.7) | 37.3 (99.1) | 39.0 (102.2) | 43.6 (110.5) |
| Mean daily maximum °C (°F) | 29.1 (84.4) | 28.8 (83.8) | 25.3 (77.5) | 20.6 (69.1) | 15.7 (60.3) | 13.1 (55.6) | 12.4 (54.3) | 13.5 (56.3) | 16.1 (61.0) | 20.1 (68.2) | 22.4 (72.3) | 26.2 (79.2) | 20.3 (68.5) |
| Mean daily minimum °C (°F) | 12.6 (54.7) | 13.4 (56.1) | 10.6 (51.1) | 7.6 (45.7) | 5.4 (41.7) | 2.9 (37.2) | 2.6 (36.7) | 3.6 (38.5) | 4.5 (40.1) | 6.4 (43.5) | 8.2 (46.8) | 10.4 (50.7) | 7.4 (45.3) |
| Record low °C (°F) | 0.8 (33.4) | 6.4 (43.5) | 2.8 (37.0) | −2.2 (28.0) | −1.8 (28.8) | −4.4 (24.1) | −3.8 (25.2) | −3.9 (25.0) | −2.2 (28.0) | −1.7 (28.9) | 1.4 (34.5) | 2.5 (36.5) | −4.4 (24.1) |
| Average rainfall mm (inches) | 32.1 (1.26) | 32.0 (1.26) | 29.1 (1.15) | 37.5 (1.48) | 50.9 (2.00) | 59.7 (2.35) | 58.7 (2.31) | 59.6 (2.35) | 53.3 (2.10) | 49.5 (1.95) | 38.3 (1.51) | 36.5 (1.44) | 537.5 (21.16) |
| Average rainy days (≥ 1 mm) | 3.2 | 2.9 | 3.5 | 4.8 | 6.6 | 8.2 | 9.4 | 9.6 | 8.0 | 6.9 | 5.0 | 4.3 | 72.4 |

== Notable people ==
- Michael James Laracy (1871–1952), shearer and trade unionist

== See also ==
- Australian gold rushes
- Pyrenees Highway, Victoria

== Notes ==
- Blainey, Geoffrey (1993). The Rush That Never Ended (4th ed.). Melbourne University Press. ISBN 0-522-84557-6.
- Linn, Rob (1999). Battling the Land: 200 years of rural Australia. Allen & Unwin. ISBN 1-86448-829-8.
- Mitchell, Thomas (1965). Three expeditions into the interior of Eastern Australia, with descriptions of the recently explored region of Australia Felix, and of the present colony of New South Wales. Libraries Board of South Australia (Facsimile edition: first published by T & W Boone, 1839). Bib ID 2270085 (National Library of Australia).
- Inglis, K.S. assisted by Jan Brazier (1998). Sacred places: war memorials in the Australian landscape. Miegunyah Press at Melbourne University Press. ISBN 0-522-84752-8.
