= List of places of worship in Pyrenees Shire =

This is a list of places of worship in the Shire of Pyrenees, a local government area in the state of Victoria, Australia. The list includes active and former churches and other religious buildings representing a variety of Christian denominations and other faiths.

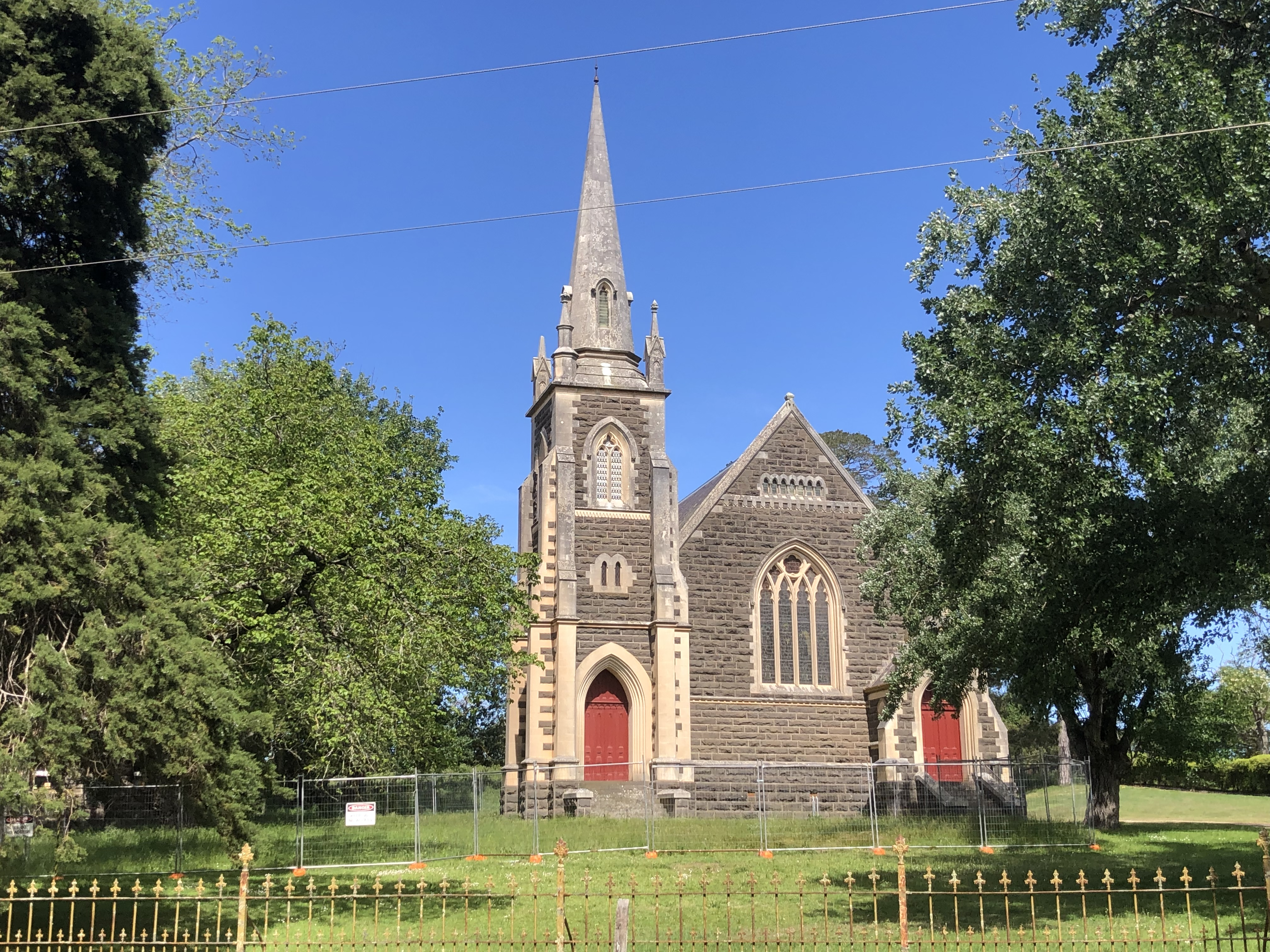
Carngham (Snake Valley) Uniting Church

== Heritage listing status ==
| Style | Status |
|---|---|
| Yes | Listed on the Victorian Heritage Register |
| – | Not listed |

== Current places of worship ==
Current places of worship
| Name | Image | Location | Denomination/ Affiliation | Heritage listing | Notes | Refs |
|---|---|---|---|---|---|---|
| St Brigid's Catholic Church, Carngham (St Brigid's Catholic Church, Snake Valley) | | Snake Valley; 37.612794°S 143.585044°E | Catholic | – | | |
| Carngham Memorial Uniting Church (Snake Valley Uniting Church) | | Snake Valley; 37.606436°S 143.589691°E | Uniting (formerly Presbyterian) | Yes | | |
| St John the Baptist Catholic Church, Waubra | | Waubra; 37.358982°S 143.640006°E | Catholic | – | | |
| St Kevin's Catholic Church, Avoca | | Avoca; 37.088297°S 143.476393°E | Catholic | – | | |
| St John the Divine Anglican Church | | Avoca; 37.086293°S 143.476441°E | Anglican | – | | |
| Avoca Baptist Church | | Avoca; 37.088110°S 143.475197°E | Baptist | – | | |
| St John the Baptist Anglican Church, Beaufort | | Beaufort; 37.430579°S 143.388820°E | Anglican | – | | |
| St John the Baptist Catholic Church, Beaufort | | Beaufort; 37.431578°S 143.387204°E | Catholic | – | | |
| St Andrew's Uniting Church, Beaufort | | Beaufort; 37.431052°S 143.381178°E | Uniting (formerly Presbyterian) | – | | |
| Beaufort Community Church | | Beaufort; 37.435178°S 143.383509°E | Baptist | – | | |
| St Andrew's Uniting Church, Landsborough | | Landsborough; 37.007112°S 143.132251°E | Uniting (formerly Presbyterian) | – | | |
| St Francis of Assisi Catholic Church | | Landsborough; 37.006009°S 143.135438°E | Catholic | – | | |
| Barkly Anglican Church (Ss Mary and Johns' Anglican Church, Barkly) | | Barkly; 36.941877°S 143.210898°E | Anglican | Yes | | |
| St Joseph's Catholic Church, Lexton | | Lexton; 37.276332°S 143.516721°E | Catholic | – | | |
| Moonambel Uniting Church | | Moonambel; 36.989590°S 143.320192°E | Uniting (formerly Presbyterian) | – | | |

== Former places of worship ==
Former places of worship
| Name | Image | Location | Denomination/ Affiliation | Heritage listing | Notes | Refs |
|---|---|---|---|---|---|---|
| Holy Trinity Anglican Church, Snake Valley (Holy Trinity Anglican Church, Carngham) | | Snake Valley; 37.609905°S 143.586190°E | Anglican | – | | |
| Snake Valley Welsh Methodist Church (Carngham Welsh Methodist Church) | | Snake Valley; 37.619609°S 143.585864°E | Methodist | Yes | | |
| St David's Uniting Church, Waubra | | Waubra; 37.357963°S 143.637038°E | Uniting (formerly Presbyterian) | – | | |
| Holy Trinity Anglican Church, Waubra | | Waubra; 37.357590°S 143.636917°E | Anglican | – | | |
| Waubra Methodist Church | | Waubra; 37.357375°S 143.635372°E | Methodist | – | | |
| Avoca Uniting Church | | Avoca; 37.086662°S 143.474967°E | Uniting (formerly Wesleyan Methodist) | – | Third Wesleyan Methodist church to be built in the town | |
| Avoca Wesleyan Methodist Church | | Avoca; 37.089300°S 143.473824°E | Wesleyan Methodist | Non-existent | Second Wesleyan Methodist Church to be built in the town | |
| Avoca Presbyterian Church | | Avoca; 37.090178°S 143.476992°E | Presbyterian | – | | |
| Beaufort Primitive Methodist Church | | Beaufort; 37.429732°S 143.380183°E | Methodist (Primitive Methodist) | – | | |
| St John's Anglican Church, Landsborough | | Landsborough; 37.009081°S 143.134151°E | Anglican | Yes | | |
| Lexton Uniting Church | | Lexton; 37.271208°S 143.514365°E | Uniting (formerly Methodist) | – | | |
| St Andrew's Presbyterian Church, Lexton | | Lexton; 37.273444°S 143.518442°E | Presbyterian | – | | |
| St Mary's Anglican Church, Lexton | | Lexton; 37.277615°S 143.517384°E | Anglican | – | | |
| St Michael's Catholic Church, Moonambel | | Moonambel; 36.989128°S 143.318963°E | Catholic | – | | |
| St Paul's Anglican Church, Moonambel | | Moonambel; 36.989393°S 143.319652°E | Anglican | – | | |
| St Patrick's Catholic Church, Amphitheatre | | Amphitheatre; 37.182172°S 143.399260°E | Catholic | – | | |
| Amphitheatre Union Church | | Amphitheatre; 37.178988°S 143.406615°E | Anglican/Presbyterian | – | | |
| St Paul's Anglican Church, Redbank | | Redbank; 36.938889°S 143.326691°E | Anglican | – | | |
| St Patrick's Catholic Church, Redbank | | Redbank; 36.935266°S 143.322030°E | Catholic | – | | |
| Redbank Uniting Church | | Redbank; 36.939213°S 143.325703°E | Uniting (formerly Wesleyan Methodist) | – | | |
| Rathscar West Uniting Church | | Rathscar West; 37.028398°S 143.480852°E | Uniting (formerly Methodist) | – | | |
| Natte Yallock Uniting Church | | Natte Yallock; 36.941283°S 143.467697°E | Uniting (formerly Wesleyan Methodist) | – | | |
| Natte Yallock Wesleyan Methodist Church (old) | | Natte Yallock; 36.940372°S 143.468371°E | Wesleyan Methodist | Non-existent | | |
| Crowlands Uniting Church | | Crowlands; 37.149179°S 143.109649°E | Uniting (formerly Methodist) | – | | |
| Evansford Presbyterian Church | | Evansford; 37.257650°S 143.626795°E | Presbyterian | – | | |
| Stockyard Hill Presbyterian Church | | Stockyard Hill | Presbyterian | Non-existent | | |

== See also ==
- List of places of worship in Golden Plains Shire
- List of places of worship in the City of Greater Geelong
