= Shire of Lexton =

Coordinates: 37°15′S 143°31′E

Shire of Lexton Victoria
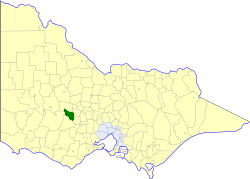
- Location in Victoria
- The Shire of Lexton as at its dissolution in 1994
- Population: 1,380 (1992)
  - Density: 1.681/km^{2} (4.353/sq mi)
- Established: 1860
- Area: 821.03 km^{2} (317.0 sq mi)
- Council seat: Lexton
- Region: Grampians
- County: Gladstone, Kara Kara, Ripon, Talbot
LGAs around Shire of Lexton:
Avoca	Avoca	Talbot and Clunes
Ararat	Shire of Lexton	Ballarat
Ripon	Ripon	Ballarat

The Shire of Lexton was a local government area about 150 kilometres (93 mi) northwest of Melbourne, the state capital of Victoria, Australia. The shire covered an area of 821.03 square kilometres (317.0 sq mi), and existed from 1860 until 1994.

== History ==
Lexton was incorporated as a road district on 17 February 1860, and became a shire on 30 June 1864. In January 1941, it annexed parts of the Shire of Avoca.

On 23 September 1994, the Shire of Lexton was abolished, and along with the Shire of Ripon and parts of the Shire of Avoca, was merged into the newly created Shire of Pyrenees.

== Wards ==
The Shire of Lexton was divided into three ridings on 1 April 1988, each of which elected three councillors:

- North Riding
- South Riding
- West Riding

== Towns and localities ==
- Amphitheatre
- Burnbank
- Evansford
- Glenbrae
- Glenlogie
- Glenpatrick
- Langi Kal Kal
- Lexton*
- Mount Lonarch
- Nowhere Creek
- Trawalla
- Waterloo
- Waubra

* Council seat.

== Population ==
Year	Population
1954	1,350
1958	1,470*
1961	1,443
1966	1,371
1971	1,315
1976	1,280
1981	1,211
1986	1,295
1991	1,314

* Estimate in the 1958 Victorian Year Book.
