= Shire of Ripon =

Coordinates: 37°26′S 143°23′E

- Local government area
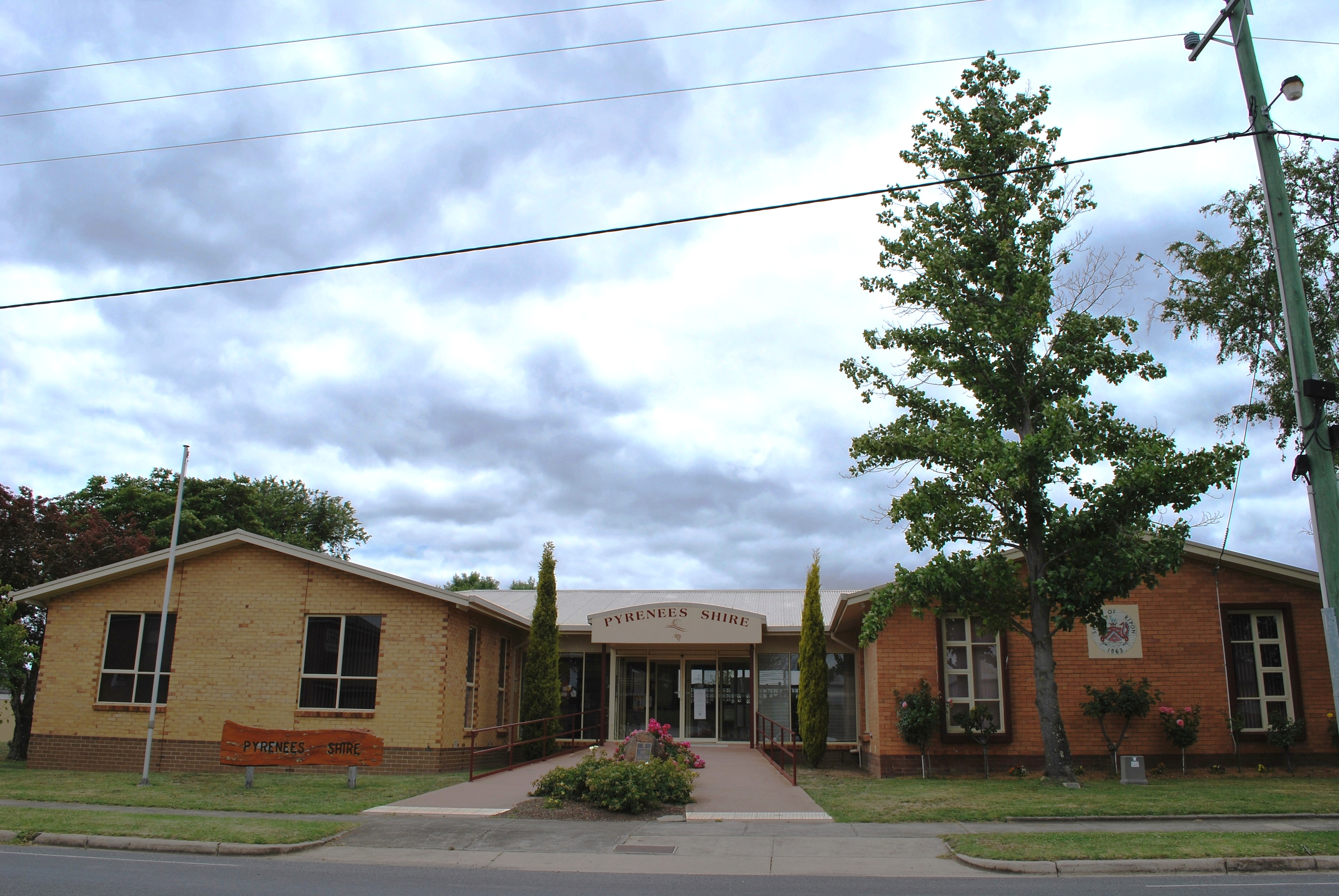
- The shire offices in Beaufort
- The Shire of Ripon as at its dissolution in 1994
- Country: Australia
- State: Victoria
- Region: Grampians
- Established: 1861
- Council seat: Beaufort

Area
  - Total: 1,533 km^{2} (592 sq mi)

Population
  - Total(s): 3,530 (1992)
  - Density: 2.303/km^{2} (5.964/sq mi)
- County: Grenville, Ripon
LGAs around Shire of Ripon
Ararat	Lexton	Lexton
Ararat	Shire of Ripon	Ballarat
Mortlake	Hampden	Grenville

The Shire of Ripon was a local government area about 160 kilometres (99 mi) west-northwest of Melbourne, the state capital of Victoria, Australia. The shire covered an area of 1,533 square kilometres (591.9 sq mi), and existed from 1861 until 1994.

== History ==
Ripon was incorporated as a road district on 12 April 1861, and became a shire on 18 December 1863.

On 23 September 1994, the Shire of Ripon was abolished, and along with the Shire of Lexton and parts of the Shire of Avoca, was merged into the newly created Shire of Pyrenees.

== Wards ==
Ripon was divided into three ridings, each of which elected three councillors:

- Northwest Riding
- East Riding
- Central Riding

== Towns and localities ==
- Beaufort*
- Brewster
- Camp Hill
- Chute
- Middle Creek
- Mount Emu
- Raglan
- Snake Valley
- Stockyard Hill
- Trawalla
- Waterloo

* Council seat.

== Population ==
Year	Population
1954	3,365
1958	3,700*
1961	3,581
1966	3,512
1971	3,212
1976	3,204
1981	3,088
1986	3,317
1991	3,464

* Estimate in the 1958 Victorian Year Book.
