= Landsborough =

Landsborough may refer to:

== People ==
- Charlie Landsborough (born 1941), English country and folk musician and singer
- William Landsborough (1825–1886), Australian explorer and member of the Queensland Legislative Council

== Places ==
- Landsborough, Queensland in the Sunshine coast region of Australia
  - Landsborough railway station
- Landsborough, Victoria in the Shire of Pyrenees in Australia
- Landsborough County cadastral region in New South Wales, Australia
- Landsborough Highway in western Queensland, Australia
- Shire of Landsborough (1912–1987), Australian local government area now known as City of Caloundra
- Landsborough River, in the South Island of New Zealand.
