= Snake Valley =

Snake Valley may refer to:

- Snake Valley, Victoria, Australia
- Snake Valley, Alberta, Canada
- Snake Valley (band)
- Snake Valley (Great Basin), a valley partially in Nevada and Utah, United States
- Snake Valley, South Africa
