= Cyril Callister =

Australian chemist and food technologist

Cyril P. Callister
- Born: Cyril Percy Callister. 16 February 1893; Chute, Colony of Victoria
- Died: 5 October 1949 (aged 56); Kew, Victoria, Victoria, Australia
- Occupations: Chemist, food technologist
- Known for: creator of Vegemite, contributions towards processed cheese

Cyril Percy Callister (16 February 1893 – 5 October 1949) was an Australian chemist and food technologist who developed the Vegemite yeast spread. As well as Vegemite, he is known for his contributions towards processed cheese.

== Early life ==
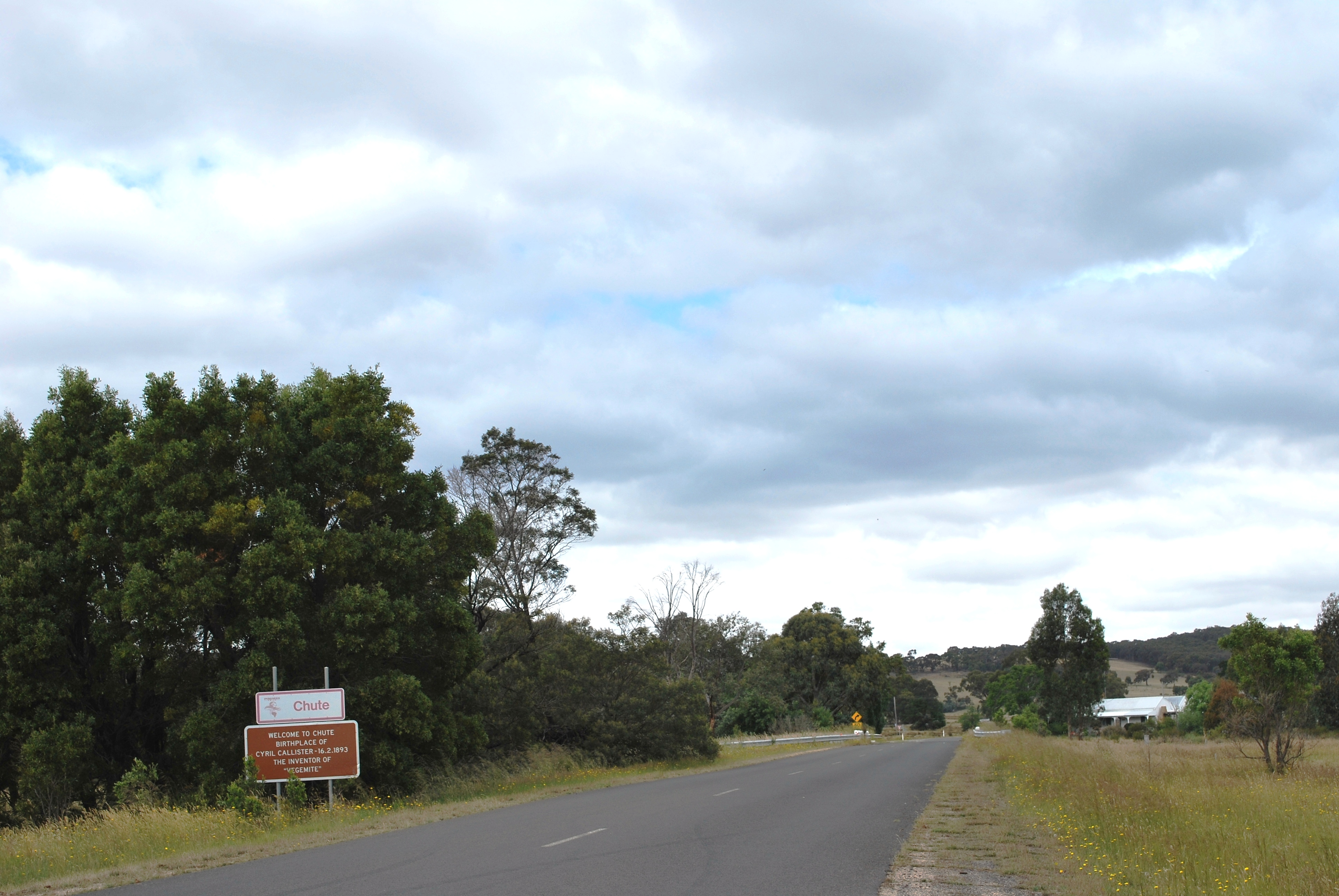
Sign marking the birthplace of Cyril Callister

Callister was born on 16 February 1893, in Chute, Victoria near Ballarat, son of Rosetta Anne (née Dixon) and William Hugh Callister, a teacher and postmaster. The second son of seven children, he attended the Ballarat School of Mines and Grenville College, and later won a scholarship to the University of Melbourne. He gained a Bachelor of Science degree in 1914 and a Master of Science degree in 1917.

In early 1915, Callister was employed by food manufacturer Lewis & Whitty, but later that year he enlisted in the Australian Imperial Force. After 53 days, however, he was withdrawn from active service on the order of the Minister for Defence and assigned to the Munitions Branch, making explosives in Britain due to his knowledge of chemistry. He worked on munitions in England, Wales, and then in Scotland, at HM Factory Gretna where he worked as a shift chemist. Whilst at Gretna he was elected as an Associate of the Institute of Chemistry in 1918.

Following the end of World War I, he met and married Scottish girl Katherine Hope Mundell and returned to Australia and resumed employment with Lewis & Whitty in 1919.

== The invention of Vegemite ==
In the early 1920s, Callister was employed by Fred Walker and given the task of developing a yeast extract, as imports from the United Kingdom of Marmite had been disrupted in the aftermath of World War I. He experimented on spent brewer's yeast and independently developed what came to be called Vegemite, first sold by Fred Walker & Co in 1923.

Working from the details of a James L. Kraft patent, Callister was successful in producing processed cheese. The Walker Company negotiated a deal for the rights to manufacture the product, and in 1926, the Kraft Walker Cheese Co. was established. Callister was appointed chief scientist and production superintendent of the new company.

== Children ==
Between 1919 and 1927 the Callisters had three children: Ian, Bill and Jean, who were "the original Vegemite kids". Drew is a great-great-grandson and loves his Vegemite. During World War II, Ian died.

== Later life ==
Callister got his Doctorate from the University of Melbourne in 1931, with his submission largely based on his work in developing Vegemite.

He was a prominent member of the Royal Australian Chemical Institute, helping it to get a Royal Charter in 1931.

Callister died at his home in Wellington Street, Kew, Melbourne in 1949, following a heart attack and is buried at Box Hill Cemetery. He had a history of heart attacks, with his first occurring in late 1939. His estate was valued for probate at £45,917.

== Legacy ==
A biography of Callister, The Man Who Invented Vegemite, written by his grandson Jamie Callister, was published in 2012.

Callister is the great-uncle to Kent Callister, a professional snowboarder who has competed at the 2014 Winter Olympics for Australia.

The Cyril Callister Foundation, established in 2019, commemorates his life and work. It runs a museum in Beaufort, Victoria.
