= Shire of Avoca =

Shire of Avoca Victoria
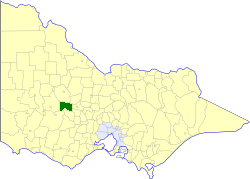
- Location in Victoria
- The Shire of Avoca as at its dissolution in 1994
- Population: 2,320 (1992)
  - Density: 2.064/km^{2} (5.346/sq mi)
- Established: 1861
- Area: 1,124 km^{2} (434.0 sq mi)
- Council seat: Avoca
- Region: Grampians
- County: Gladstone, Kara Kara
LGAs around Shire of Avoca:
Kara Kara	Kara Kara	Bet Bet
Stawell	Shire of Avoca	Tullaroop
Ararat	Lexton	Talbot and Clunes

The Shire of Avoca was a local government area about 180 kilometres (112 mi) northwest of Melbourne, the state capital of Victoria, Australia. The shire covered an area of 1,124 square kilometres (434.0 sq mi), and existed from 1861 until 1994.

== History ==
Avoca was first incorporated as a road district on 6 December 1861, and became a shire on 28 December 1864. In January 1941, it lost parts of its area to the Shire of Lexton.

On 23 September 1994, the Shire of Avoca was abolished, and along with the Shires of Lexton and Ripon, was merged into the newly created Shire of Pyrenees. The district surrounding Navarre was transferred to the newly created Shire of Northern Grampians in January 1995.

== Wards ==
The Shire of Avoca was divided into three ridings, each of which elected three councillors:

- Avoca Township Riding
- East Riding
- West Riding

== Towns and localities ==
- Avoca*
- Barkly
- Crowlands
- Frenchmans
- Glenlofty
- Homebush
- Lamplough
- Landsborough
- Moonambel
- Natte Yallock
- Navarre
- Percydale
- Rathscar
- Rathscar West
- Redbank
- Tanwood
- Warrenmang
- Wattle Creek

* Council seat.

== Population ==
Year	Population
1954	2,381
1958	2,460*
1961	2,153
1966	2,134
1971	1,962
1976	2,022
1981	2,094
1986	2,144
1991	2,190

* Estimate in the 1958 Victorian Year Book.
