= Percydale, Victoria =

Locality in Victoria (Australia)

Percydale
- Town
- Interactive map of Percydale
- Coordinates: 37.053°S 143.395°E
- Country: Australia
- State: Victoria
- LGA: Pyrenees Shire
- Location: 7 km (4.3 mi) northwest of Avoca

Government
  - State electorate: Ripon
  - Federal division: Mallee

Population
  - Total: 22 (2021 census)
- Postcode: 3478
Localities around Percydale
	Tanwood
Warrenmang	Percydale	Avoca
Glenpatrick		Amphitheatre

Percydale is a rural locality in the Shire of Pyrenees, Victoria, Australia. It lies on the eastern slopes of the Pyrenees Range, and was part of the Victorian Goldfields from 1854. At the 2021 census, Percydale had a population of 22.

== History ==
The Percydale area was known as Fiddlers Creek when alluvial gold was first identified there in 1854. A further find in 1869 led to a gold rush with a population over 2000 people when a school was opened in 1870. It appears to have been named after a son of Police Magistrate Charles Carr. The school closed in 1942. The town also had both Episcopalian and Wesleyan churches. There is a Percydale Goldfields Heritage Tour which includes visible remains of that history.
