= Shire of Talbot and Clunes =

Coordinates: 37°10′S 143°42′E

- Local government area
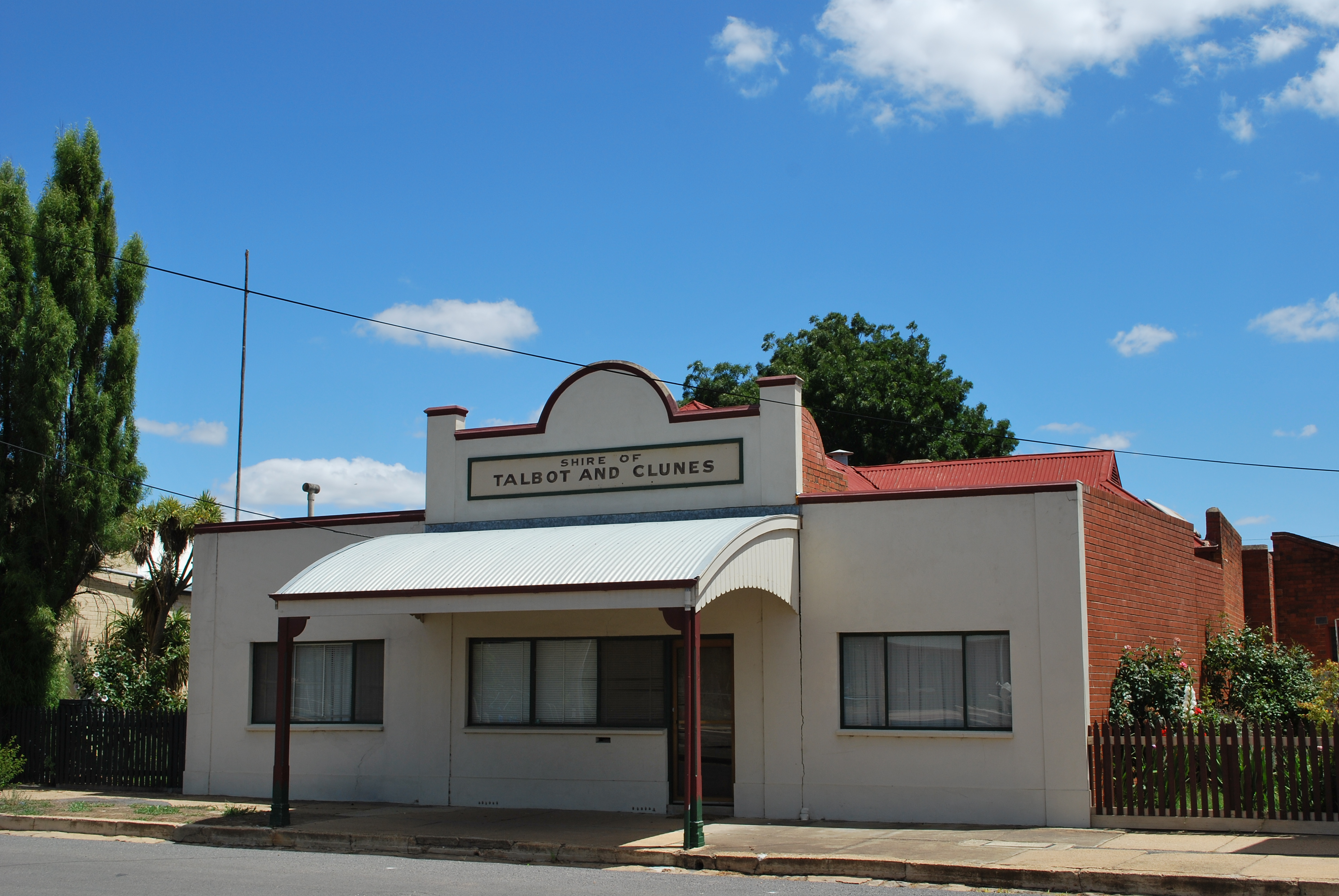
- Shire offices at Talbot
- The Shire of Talbot and Clunes as at its dissolution in 1995
- Country: Australia
- State: Victoria
- Region: Grampians
- Established: 1915
- Council seat: Talbot

Area
  - Total: 541.31 km^{2} (209.00 sq mi)

Population
  - Total(s): 2,580 (1992)
  - Density: 4.766/km^{2} (12.344/sq mi)
- County: Talbot
LGAs around Shire of Talbot and Clunes
Avoca	Tullaroop	Newstead
Avoca	Shire of Talbot and Clunes	Creswick
Lexton	Ballarat	Creswick

The Shire of Talbot and Clunes was a local government area about 160 kilometres (99 mi) northwest of Melbourne, the state capital of Victoria, Australia. The shire covered an area of 541.31 square kilometres (209.0 sq mi), and existed from 1915 until 1994.

== History ==
What became the Shire of Talbot and Clunes had its origins in several different local authorities during the 1850s gold rush:

- The Borough of Amherst was incorporated on 22 October 1858, with an area of 22.57 km^{2} (8.71 sq mi), surrounding the towns of Amherst and Talbot. It was renamed as the Borough of Talbot on 19 April 1915, as Talbot by that time had eclipsed Amherst.
- The Borough of Clunes was incorporated on 19 October 1860, with an area of 23.31 km^{2} (9.00 sq mi), surrounding the town of Clunes.
- The Amherst and Clunes Road District was incorporated on 16 November 1860, and was redesignated as a shire under the name of Shire of Talbot on 31 October 1865.

After the passage of the Local Government Amendment Act 1914, it was found that Talbot Borough did not meet the criteria for a borough, as its rateable income was below £300 per annum, so it was absorbed by Talbot Shire on 1 October 1915.

On 31 May 1965, an Order in Council united the Borough of Clunes with the Shire of Talbot, to create the new shire of Talbot and Clunes.

On 20 January 1995, the Shire of Talbot and Clunes was abolished, and was split between the newly created Shire of Central Goldfields (Talbot) and the newly created Shire of Hepburn (Clunes).

== Wards ==
Talbot and Clunes was divided into four ridings, each of which elected three councillors:

- Clunes North Riding
- Clunes South Riding
- East Riding
- Talbot Riding

== Towns and localities ==
- Amherst
- Caralulup
- Clunes
- Daisy Hill
- Dunach
- Mount Beckworth
- Red Lion
- Talbot*

* Council seat.

== Population ==
Year	Population
1954	1,674
1958	1,730*
1961	1,578
1966	1,517
1971	1,445
1976	1,396
1981	1,657
1986	2,091
1991	2,443

* Estimate in 1958 Victorian Year Book.
