= Grenville College, Ballarat =

Grenville College was a small non-sectarian private school in Ballarat, Victoria. Although those enrolled were predominantly boys, at least one, quite notable, student was female.

== History ==
In 1855 or earlier, Rev. T. R. Thackeray founded the Ballarat Grammar School. By September 1857 the principal was J. M. Strongman and the master was William Stallard (late of the Commercial Academy), and the school was scheduled to open on Sturt Street in October 1857, however, by June 1857 it was in the old Commercial Academy premises, Doveton Street with William Stallard as principal.

In 1860 or earlier, John Victor founded Ballarat Collegiate School in a large rented house in Dana Street, Ballarat, then in December 1860 moved to Windsor House, Creswick Road (south), Ballarat.

A third institution, Ballarat College, principal McCoy, opened in July 1864 and by December 1867 had an enrolment of 173.

In December 1866 John Victor purchased Stallard's interest in Ballarat Grammar School and combined the two as Ballarat Collegiate and Grammar School in Doveton Street. In April 1868 H. B. de la Poer Wall was brought in as partner and vice-principal. In 1868 Victor had Ballarat architect Henry R. Caselli design a grandiose college building in ecclesiastic style to be built on a six-acre greenfield site on Creswick Road, Ballarat. The scheme fell through, ascribed to title difficulties, and instead Caselli (who designed Ballarat's Alfred Hall) designed a two-storey building for Holmes Street, attached to the existing residence. The building was 55 by 23 feet (16.8 by 7.0 m), of two storeys with a tower; the ground floor held a schoolroom with 16 feet (4.9 m) ceilings, and dormitories for boarders and staff on the upper floor. Around this time the college became known as Grenville. They continued to use the building on Creswick Road. The proprietors also ran the Agriculture Training, Grammar and Commercial School at Gracefield, near Ballarat.

At the end of 1869 Victor retired to run a college in Sale, Gippsland, leaving Wall in charge, but in January 1872 Victor returned, displacing him. At the annual distribution of prizes in 1879 Victor retired for good, announcing as his successor A. A. Buley, who had matriculated from the college eleven years earlier. Buley ran the college with distinction from 1880 to 1910, when he accepted a position as Senior Master position with the Agricultural High School, and the college folded. He was later on the staff of Melbourne High School.

The edifice on Holmes Street was demolished in 1947.

== Students ==
Its most notable student was Robert Gordon Menzies, who won a scholarship to the college while a student at Humffray Street State School. He was subsequently sent to Wesley College, and Melbourne University, studied law, was appointed King's Counsel and eventually Prime Minister of Australia. Others include:

- Raymond Anthony (c. 1885 – 2 June 1949) Navy finance officer
- John Arthur, barrister and MHR, dux in 1887
- Dr Cyril P. Callister, chemist, developed Vegemite
- John A. Carey (died November 1929) irrigation pioneer
- Walter Henry Collyer (died 6 December 1948), engineer and academic
- James Grattan Eagleson (died 26 May 1919), judge, dux in 1883
- Ernest Gaunt, vice-admiral and brother of the author
- Mary Gaunt, author
- Ernest George Muller Gibson (died 11 November 1944) agriculture correspondent for The Argus and The Australasian
- Sir Frank Gibson, mayor of Fremantle and MLA
- Sir John Richards Harris, Victorian Minister for Education and Health
- Albert Spivey Hauser (died 14 May 1938), police magistrate
- Arthur Ernest Campbell Kerr (c. 1868 – 18 December 1939), mining engineer
- Arthur Lynch, author and MP, dux in 1877
- George Grey Nicholls, son of W. H. Nicholls, was dux in 1884
- General John Northcott, Governor of New South Wales
- Bernard O'Dowd, poet, was dux in 1882
- Archdeacon E. Jellicoe Rogers (died 23 August 1938), Anglican priest
- Dr Douglas John Thomas (February 1896 – 11 January 1954)
- Josiah Stanley Wasley (died 18 May 1953) judge

References in 1947 to John Curtin being a student there may be disregarded.

== Sporting ==
In (Australian rules) football, Grenville achieved what may be a record of sorts — a 45 goals, 44 behinds (314 points) to nil drubbing at the hands of St Patrick's College, Ballarat.
