= Snake Valley (band) =

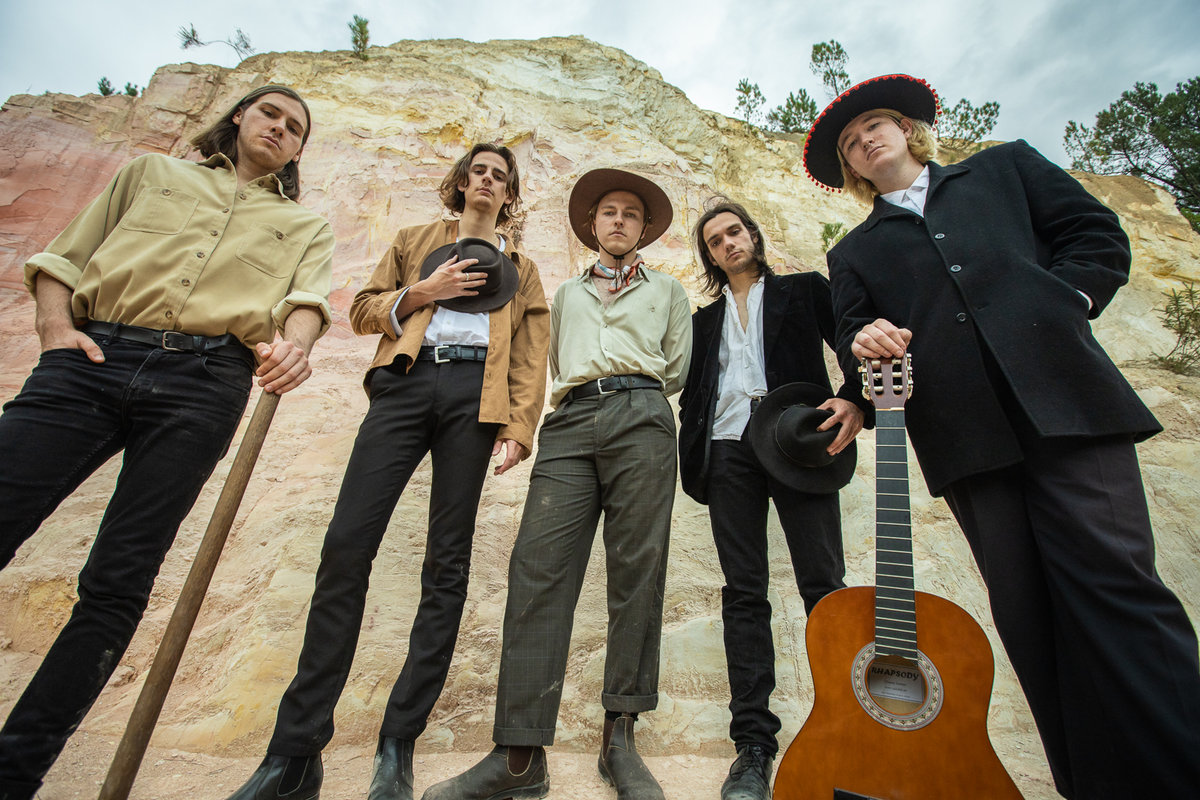

Background information
- Years active: 2018–2022
- Labels: Red Cave Records
- Past members: Matthew Martin; Walter Clayworth; Lachlan Reynolds; Brendan Siebring; Scott Urwin; Benjamin Simmons
- Website: snakevalley.bandcamp.com

Snake Valley were an Australian music group from Ballarat who took their name from the regional Victorian town Snake Valley.

== History ==
Snake Valley were formed in 2018 in Ballarat, Victoria.

According to Matthew Martin, their name was chosen based on the town Snake Valley just outside their hometown In Ballarat with Martin saying "It comes from the name of a little town just outside Ballarat where we are from. We were driving past it one day when I was going to work and our guitarist Lachie pointed it out as a sick name, we brought it to the table and it just stuck."

After relocating to Melbourne, the band released their first full studio album, Giddy Up! was released in September 2020 under the Red Cave Records label digitally and on the special edition vinyl LP.

In November 2021, Snake Valley released a follow up EP called "Price Of Gold" through Martin's Red Cave Record's.

== Discography ==
=== Studio albums ===
List of studio albums, with release date and label shown
Title	Details
Giddy Up!	Released: September 2020; Label: Red Cave Records (RCR-001); Formats: LP, Digital download, streaming

=== Extended plays ===
List of EPs, with release date and label shown
Title	Album details
Price Of Gold	Released: November 2021; Label: Red Cave Records (RCR-002); Formats: 7", Digital download, streaming
