= Shire of Pyrenees =

Coordinates: 37°10′00″S 143°25′00″E

- Local government area
- Location in Victoria

- Interactive map of Shire of Pyrenees
- Country: Australia
- State: Victoria
- Region: Grampians
- Established: 1994
- Council seat: Beaufort

Government
  - Mayor: Cr Tanya Kehoe
  - State electorate: Ripon
  - Federal divisions: Mallee; Wannon

Area
  - Total: 3,435 km^{2} (1,326 sq mi)

Population
  - Total: 7,671 (2021)
  - Density: 2.2332/km^{2} (5.7839/sq mi)
- Gazetted: 23 September 1994
- Website: Shire of Pyrenees
LGAs around Shire of Pyrenees
Northern Grampians	Northern Grampians	Central Goldfields
Ararat	Shire of Pyrenees	Hepburn, Ballarat
Ararat	Corangamite	Golden Plains

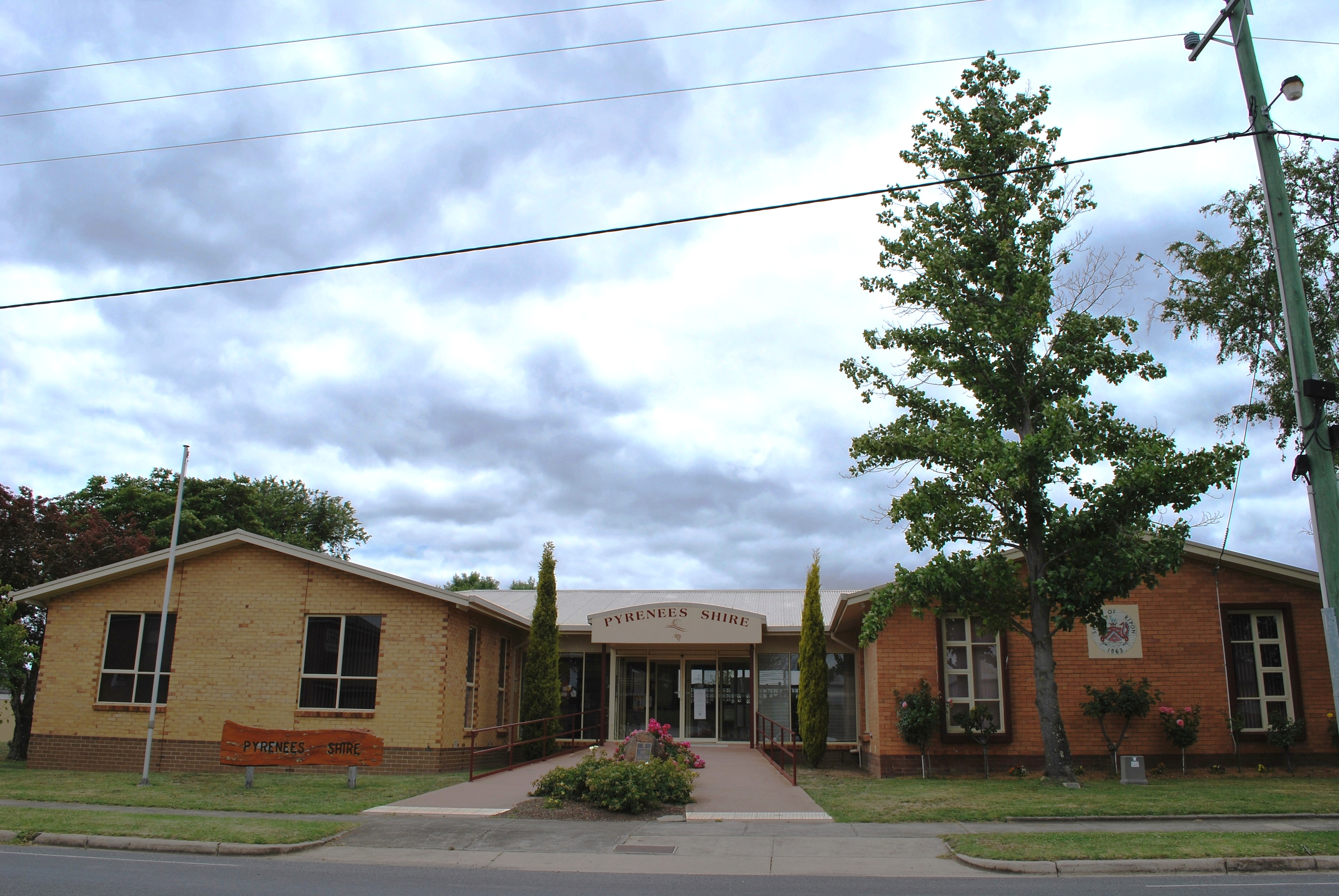
The Pyrenees Shire Council offices in Beaufort

The Shire of Pyrenees is a local government area (LGA) in Victoria, Australia, located in the western part of the state. It covers an area of 3,435 square kilometres (1,326 mi^{2}) and in June 2018 had a population of 7,353. It includes the towns of Avoca, Beaufort, Lexton, Snake Valley and Trawalla.

The Shire is governed and administered by the Pyrenees Shire Council; its seat of local government and administrative centre is located at the council headquarters in Beaufort, it also has a service centre located in Avoca. The Shire is named after the major geographical feature in the region, the Pyrenees Ranges, located in the north of the Shire, which also lends its name to the Pyrenees wine region.

== History ==
The Pyrenees Shire was formed in 1994 from the amalgamation of the Shire of Avoca (less the township of Navarre in the extreme north-west corner), Shire of Lexton, and Shire of Ripon (less the Lake Burrumbeet area).

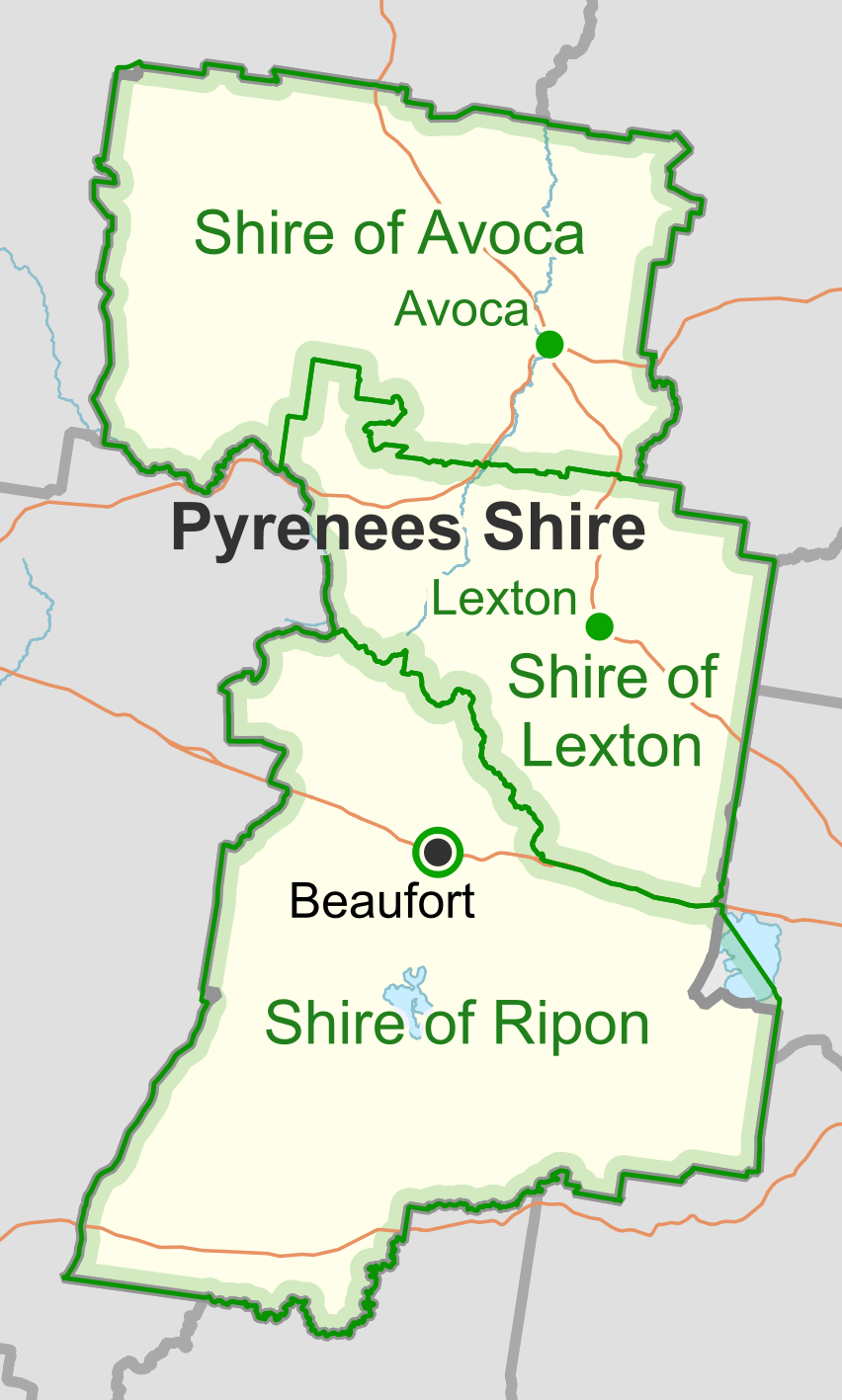
Pyrenees Shire's predecessor LGAs (green) as they were in 1994. The administrative centres of the former LGAs are marked by green dots.

== Council ==
=== Current composition ===
2024 ward boundaries. Expand the map and click on a ward to see the ward name.

The council is composed of five wards and five councillors, with one councillor per ward elected to represent each ward. Council Composition as of August 2025:

Ward	Councillor	Notes
Avoca	Rebecca Wardlaw	
Beaufort	Damian Ferrari	
De Cameron	Megan Phelan	
Ercildoune	Simon Tol	
Mount Emu	Tanya Kehoe	Mayor

=== Administration and governance ===
The council meets in the council chambers at the council headquarters in the Beaufort Municipal Offices, which is also the location of the council's administrative activities. It also provides customer services at both its administrative centre in Beaufort, and its service centre in Avoca.

== Traditional owners ==
The traditional owners of this land are the Wadawurrung, Dja Dja Wurrung, Eastern Maar, Wotjobaluk, Jaadwa, Jardwadjali, Wergaia and Jupagulk.

== Townships and localities ==
In the 2021 census, the shire's population was 7,671, up from 7,238 in the 2016 census.

Population
Locality	2016	2021
Amphitheatre	248	223
Avoca	1,193	1,356
Barkly^	43	49
Beaufort	1,539	1,712
Bo Peep^	21	25
Brewster	51	47
Buangor^	103	112
Bung Bong^	51	63
Burnbank	59	47
Burrumbeet^	232	249
Carngham	146	171
Carranballac^	42	43
Chepstowe	61	60
Chute	18	13
Cross Roads	19	27
Crowlands^	89	72
Elmhurst^	183	185
Ercildoune^	70	90
Evansford^	131	147
Eversley^	10	14
Frenchmans	13	7
Glenbrae	30	30
Glenlofty	17	11
Glenlogie^	33	29
Glenpatrick	31	13
Hillcrest	95	99
Homebush	36	31
Lake Goldsmith	29	22
Lake Wongan	8	3
Lamplough	61	49
Landsborough	180	200
Landsborough West^	41	49
Langi Kal Kal	400	336
Lexton	231	284
Lillicur^	29	85
Linton^	580	635
Main Lead	46	42
Mena Park	27	32
Middle Creek^	19	22
Moonambel	167	185
Mount Emu	26	28
Mount Lonarch	42	44
Natte Yallock^	94	89
Navarre^	98	99
Nerring	15	14
Nowhere Creek	17	20
Percydale	39	22
Pittong^	15	12
Raglan	231	223
Rathscar^	21	19
Rathscar West	23	31
Redbank^	94	102
Shays Flat^	13	3
Skipton^	586	609
Smythesdale^	1,032	1,189
Snake Valley	743	820
Stockyard Hill	49	49
Stoneleigh^	45	45
Streatham^	156	158
Tanwood	26	15
Trawalla	141	140
Wareek^	68	72
Warrenmang	17	16
Waterloo	110	122
Wattle Creek^	0	0
Waubra^	275	308

^ - Territory divided with another LGA

== See also ==
- List of places of worship in Pyrenees Shire
