= Jane Fryer =

Political and religious radical (1832–1917)

- Born: Jane Trump; 14 October 1832; Taunton
- Died: 16 June 1917 (aged 84); Moonee Ponds
- Known for: political and religious radical
- Spouse: John Robbins Fryer
- Children: 10+

Jane Fryer born Jane Trump (14 October 1832 – 16 June 1917) was an Australian political and religious radical. She was one of the first women to be married in the register offices in Bristol before she emigrated to the Australian State of Victoria. There she supported Methodists, Quakers and the Australasian Secular Association.

== Early life ==
Jane Fryer was born in south-west England in 1832 in the Somerset town of Taunton. Her mother was Ruth (born Dwelly) and her controlling father was Leonard Trump. Mr Trump came from a Dutch family and he worked as a baker. When she was fifteen she left her Wesleyan family and in particular her father and started a new life in Bristol.

She stayed with a Chartist family and attended Sunday School where there were intense debates about the morality of the Opium wars between Britain and China. That debate led to her not becoming a member of that church.

On 27 October 1853 she was one of the first brides married at Bristol's register office after it opened. This was a brave decision as, although the marriages were legal, they were frowned upon by church ministers and it was the tradition to be married in church. She married a Somerset born carpenter of Welsh descent named John Robbins Fryer (1826–1912) and after the wedding she did not wear a wedding ring. She believed that the wedding ring indicated that she was her husband's servant, and this was not the case.

== Life in Australia ==
The couple emigrated to Australia on the ship Maria Hay with John's brother Jethro and his family and they were in Victoria by the following year, where Jethro was living in Ballarat.

Over the years they moved from supporting the Methodist church to joining the Quakers and then joined the Sunday Free Discussion Society after it was formed in 1870. In 1882 they were on the committee when the Australasian Secular Association was formed and it was most active in Melbourne. The poet Bernard O'Dowd put together the Australasian Secular Association Lyceum Tutor which was a collection of non-religious writing. O'Dowd edited the contents strongly to ensure that no "microbes of superstition" were included. He did include Fryer's poetry. These poems were read at the funerals of members and at associations meetings. She and her husband were strongly involved and she was a leader of the Melbourne Progressive Lyceum's Sunday school.

The Australasian Secular Organisation (ALO) was led by Joseph Symes who had been sent, at the request and expense of the ALO, from England. He led the organisation's campaigns for art galleries to open on Sundays and took on the resulting prosecutions. Symes was wilful and demanding. Fryer and her husband resisted and they were unfairly accused of misusing funds and of wanting anarchy. Symes had a few followers after the ALO broke up in 1888.

In 1889 Bernard O'Dowd married her daughter, Evangeline Mina Fryer (11 May 1865 – 7 Apr 1956) although the couple later separated. The O'Dowds and Jane and John Fryer lived in the same house for three years in North Melbourne. O'Dowd thought Jane Fryer was "a fine woman" "free of society's shackles" but the two-family household was unhappy and Jane was the prime cause.

Fryer died in 1917 in the Melbourne suburb of Moonee Ponds.

== Private life ==
Fryer did want to be a mother and, in addition to the ten children she had with John, they also fostered another six. Four of her children died before they became adults.
