= Snake Valley Astronomical Association =

Australian astronomy association

The Emblem of the SVAA

The Snake Valley Astronomical Association (SVAA) is an amateur astronomy club based in Snake Valley, Victoria, Australia. Established in 2005, membership of the SVAA is open to people with an interest in any form of astronomy. As of June 2011 the SVAA has around 30 members.

== History ==
The original idea to create the SVAA was first discussed by three Snake Valley residents (Ken James, David Johnson, Anthony Baker) and the Shire Mayor (Lysette Ashford) at the 1st Snake Valley Astronomy Camp in 2005. This idea came about due to the dark sky at Snake Valley and the amount of interest shown by attendees at the Astronomy Camp. A public meeting was called in the Snake Valley Hall late in 2005 to investigate interest in the establishment of a club. Twelve people attended that event, and it was decided to go ahead. The first official meeting was held at the Snake Valley Recreation Reserve with 15 people in attendance.

The first Clubroom/Observing location was at the Recreation reserve in 2006 and was 'home' for the next two years. Then in 2008, member Ken James granted the club the use of 3 acres of his property as a Club managed location. A large donation from member Hoerst Bonkhe was forwarded to Mr. James to go towards the construction of a Club meeting room and the possibility of a future Observatory with the stipulation that the Club Room be made available for club members use whilst Mr. James owns the property. Construction of a Clubroom started immediately in 2008 and the Observatory commenced early in 2016 (Construction of both is now finished). During this time many other donations of Astronomy books, Telescopes, and accessories have built up into a lending library for members.

In 2015 Snake Valley was denoted gold status by the Australian Dark Sky Register.

== Activities ==
The SVAA holds monthly meetings, which are open to the public. The club also holds astronomy classes. Members occasionally do talks and demonstrations for local primary schools, high schools, and other groups. SVAA also runs 2 day basic astronomy competency courses suitable for 'Scouts Australia Astronomer Badge' and other groups.

== Branches of astronomy ==
Members of the SVAA are involved in a variety of interests within astronomy:

- Visual - Many members do Visual work, which involves observing with Eyepieces.
- Imaging - Members also do Astrophotography using Digital Cameras, CCD Imagers, and webcams.
- Video Astronomy - Some members do Live 'Video Astronomy' of Solar System and Deep Space Objects.
- Live Broadcasting - Some members also do 'Live' broadcasts of their Video Astronomy on the Internet.
- Radio Astronomy - is a branch of Astronomy the club is about to move into.

== See also ==
- List of astronomical societies
