= Bernard O'Dowd =

Australian poet and activist

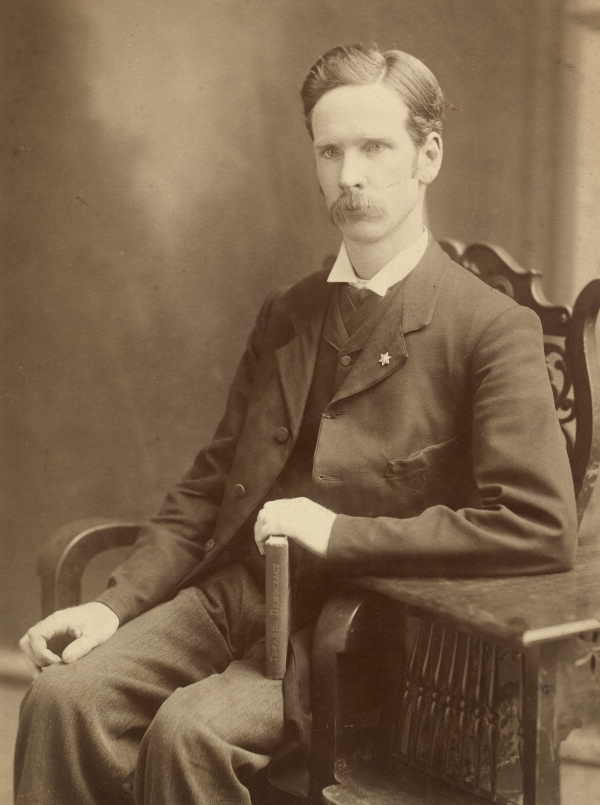
- O'Dowd near age 38
- Born: Bernard Patrick O'Dowd; 11 April 1866; Beaufort, Victoria
- Died: 1 September 1953 (aged 87); Melbourne, Victoria
- Occupations: Poet, activist, lawyer and journalist
- Writing career
- Language: English
- Years active: 1888–1953

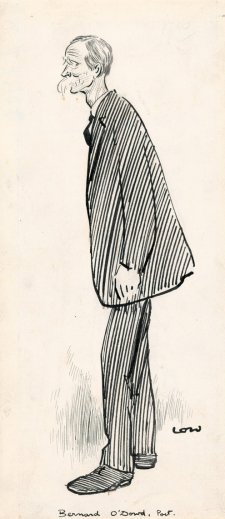
Caricature, David Low, 1919.

Bernard Patrick O'Dowd (11 April 1866 – 1 September 1953) was an Australian poet, activist, lawyer, and journalist. He worked for the Victorian colonial and state governments for almost 50 years, first as an assistant librarian at the Supreme Court in Melbourne, and later as a parliamentary draughtsman.

== Life and work ==
Bernard O'Dowd was born in 1866 at Beaufort, Victoria, as the eldest son of Irish migrants, Bernard O'Dowd and Ann Dowell. He was a child prodigy who read Milton's Paradise Lost at age 8 and was a student at Grenville College, Ballarat. His first job, aged 17, was as head teacher at a Catholic School in Ballarat, but he was soon dismissed for heresy. He then opened up his own school in Beaufort. In 1886, at the age of 20, he moved to Melbourne, and in 1887 took up a position as an assistant librarian in the Supreme Court Library.

In 1888 he published The Australasian Secular Association Lyceum Tutor which he had edited and it contained several of his poems. It also involved poems by Jane Fryer whose family were leading lights of the Melbourne Progressive Lyceum and in 1889 he married her daughter, Evangeline Mina Fryer. The O'Dowds and Jane and John Fry lived in the same house for three years in North Melbourne. O'Dowd thought Jane Fryer was "a fine woman" "free of society's shackles" but the two-family household was unhappy and Jane was the prime cause.

In 1913 he began a long career as a parliamentary draughtsman for the Victorian government, eventually retiring in 1935 as Chief Parliamentary Draughtsman.

Over the years, O'Dowd's official career remained distinct from his poetic and political activities. Beginning in 1897 he was a co-publisher of the first issues of the radical paper the Tocsin, which was associated with the United Labor Party. He wrote a regular column in the Tocsin as 'Gavah the Blacksmith'. Active as a lecturer with the Victorian Socialist League from about 1900, he was a founding member of the Victorian Socialist Party (V.S.P.) in 1905, and in 1912–13 assisted with editing The Socialist. One of his colleagues in the V.S.P. was John Curtin, who later became Prime Minister of Australia. In 1912 he denounced the White Australia policy as being "unbrotherly, undemocratic and unscientific."

In his private capacity, he was, at various times, a member of the Theosophical Society, Charles Strong's Australian Church and Frederick Sinclaire's Free Religious Fellowship.

O'Dowd's partner Marie Pitt was also a notable poet and socialist; they had a home at 155 Clark Street, Northcote. After 1929 O'Dowd and Pitt attended services at the Unitarian church on Cathedral Place. He declared a wish to be buried according to Unitarian traditions, but when he died, in St Vincent's Hospital, his family insisted on a Catholic funeral, the faith into which he was born. In the end, however, his will prevailed and the service was conducted by Rev. Victor James, followed by cremation at Springvale.

The words "Mammon or millennial Eden", taken from one of O'Dowd's poems, are inscribed around the Federation Pavilion in Centennial Park, Sydney, a structure designed in 1988, the bicentennial year of European settlement in Australia, as a permanent monument to Federation.

== Bibliography ==
=== Poetry collections ===
- Dawnward? (1903)
- The Silent Land and Other Verses (1906)
- Dominions of the Boundary (1907)
- The Seven Deadly Sins : (A Series of Sonnets) and Other Verses (1909)
- Poems (1910)
- Alma Venus! and Other Verses (1921)
- Selected Poems (1928)
- The Poems of Bernard O'Dowd : Collected Edition (1941)
- Bernard O'Dowd (1963)

=== Essays ===
- Fantasies (1942)
- Conscience and Democracy (1902)

=== Edited ===
- The Australasian Secular Association Lyceum Tutor (1888)
