= Carngham =

- Town
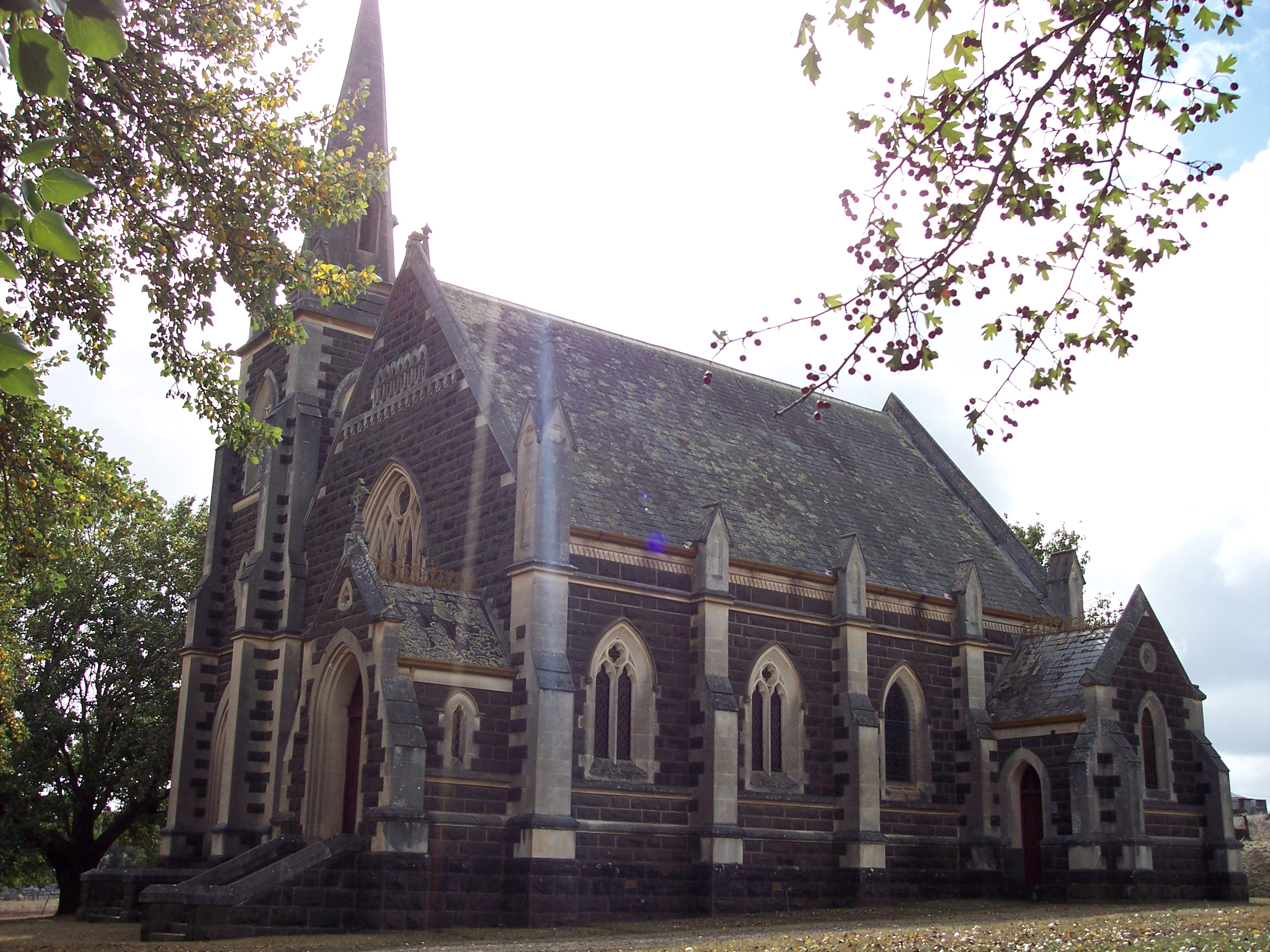
- Uniting church at Carngham, 2008

- Coordinates: 37°34′52″S 143°35′02″E
- Country: Australia
- State: Victoria
- LGA: Pyrenees Shire
- Location: 151 km (94 mi) W of Melbourne; 26 km (16 mi) W of Ballarat; 4 km (2.5 mi) NW of Snake Valley

Government
  - State electorate: Ripon
  - Federal division: Wannon

Population
  - Total: 146 (2016 census)
- Postcode: 3351

Carngham (/ˈkɑːrnəm/) is a locality in central Victoria, Australia. The locality is in the Shire of Pyrenees local government area, 151 kilometres (94 mi) west of the state capital, Melbourne.

At the 2016 census, Carngham had a population of 146.
