= St David's Uniting Church, Waubra =

Closed Uniting church in Waubra, Victoria, Australia

St David's Uniting Church
- St David's Presbyterian Church
- Waubra Uniting Church (Waubra Presbyterian Church)
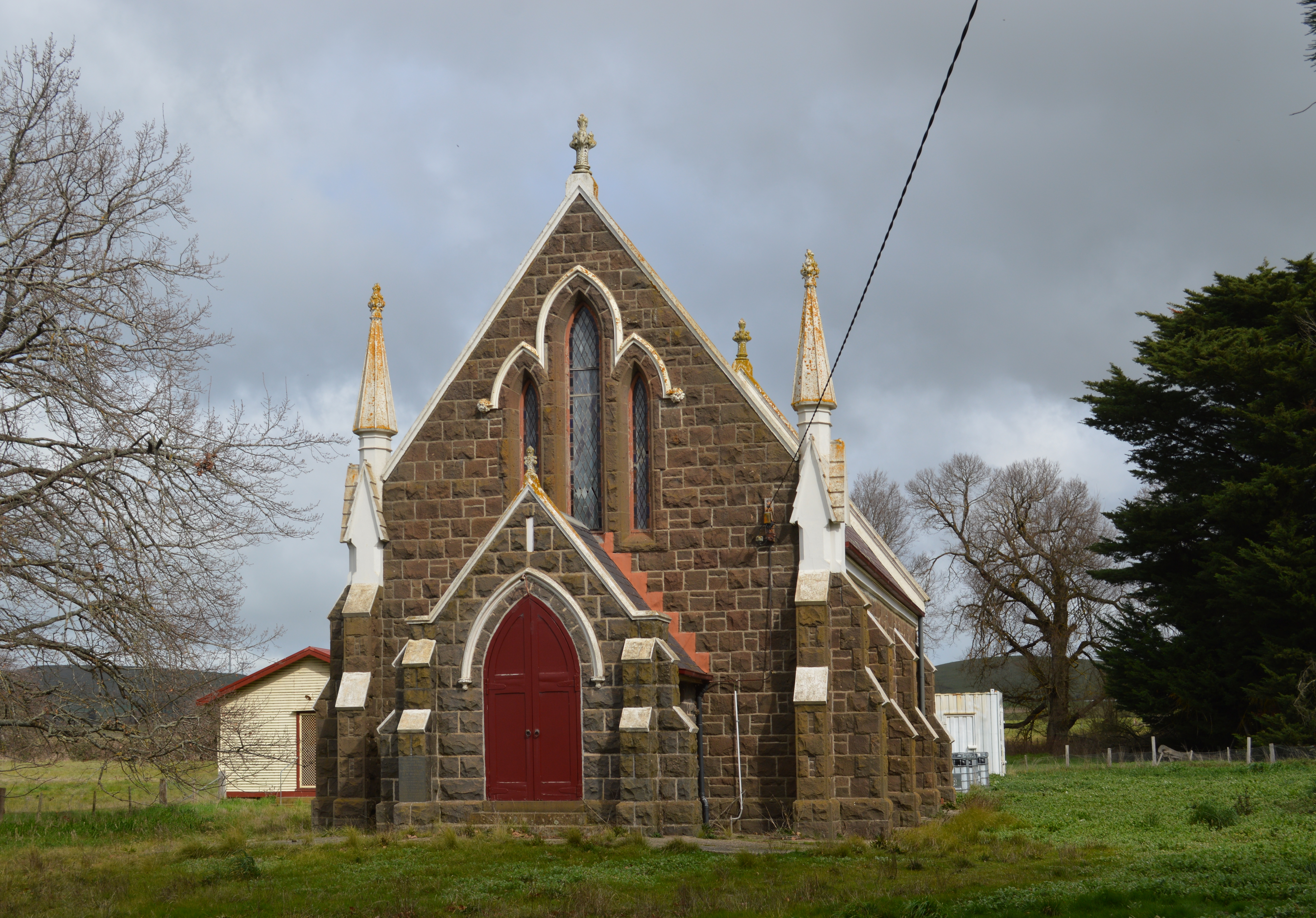
- Waubra Uniting Church
- St David's Uniting Church
- 37.35794°S 143.63704°E
- Address: 2063 Sunraysia Highway, Waubra, Victoria
- Country: Australia
- Denomination: Uniting (since 1977)

History
- Status: Closed (private residence)
- Dedication: Saint David

Architecture
- Architect: Joseph Doane
- Architectural type: Church
- Style: Victorian Gothic
- Completed: 1873
- Closed: ~2018

St David's Uniting Church (formerly St David's Presbyterian Church) is a former Uniting church located in the town of Waubra, Victoria, Australia. The church opened in 1873 as a Presbyterian church, until changing to the Uniting church in 1977, under which it remained until the late 2010s, before being sold in 2021. The church is one of several historic buildings in the town.

== History ==
As early as 1860, Presbyterians in the district would make applications to use the town's Wesleyan church for Presbyterian services at select times. It was alleged that because some Presbyterians had partly funded the construction of the Wesleyan church, they should be able to use the building. The Wesleyans refused the applications, and so the Presbyterians decided to erect their own church, which would double as a school.

The Presbyterians advertised their plans and specifications for a timber church through columns in The Ballarat Star newspaper, and that the cost of the church should not exceed £200.

On 26 May 1860, a meeting was held in Mr Mc.Donald's barn, who, including himself, assembled a committee to raise funds for the construction of the church. In total, they received £120. The tender of Mr. D. Ross was selected, along with the minister of the church, Rev. W. Mackie. The church was opened that year.

The foundation stone of the present bluestone church building was laid on Tuesday 24 June 1873 by James Robertson, of Mount Mitchell, and the building was designed by Joseph Doane, an architect from Ballarat.

A foundation stone was laid for the vestry on 24 June 1910 to commemorate the jubilee of the church, and a foundation stone on the porch of the church was laid by M. G. Buchanan, on 24 June 1933.

On 20 February 2018, a bible from the church was donated to the Learmonth & District Historical Society.

The church changed to the Uniting Church of Australia in 1977, and continued under the direction of that church until at least 2018. On 18 February 2021, the church was sold for $380,000.
