= St John the Baptist's Church, Waubra =

Roman Catholic church in Waubra, Victoria, Australia

St John's Catholic Church
- St John the Baptist Catholic Church
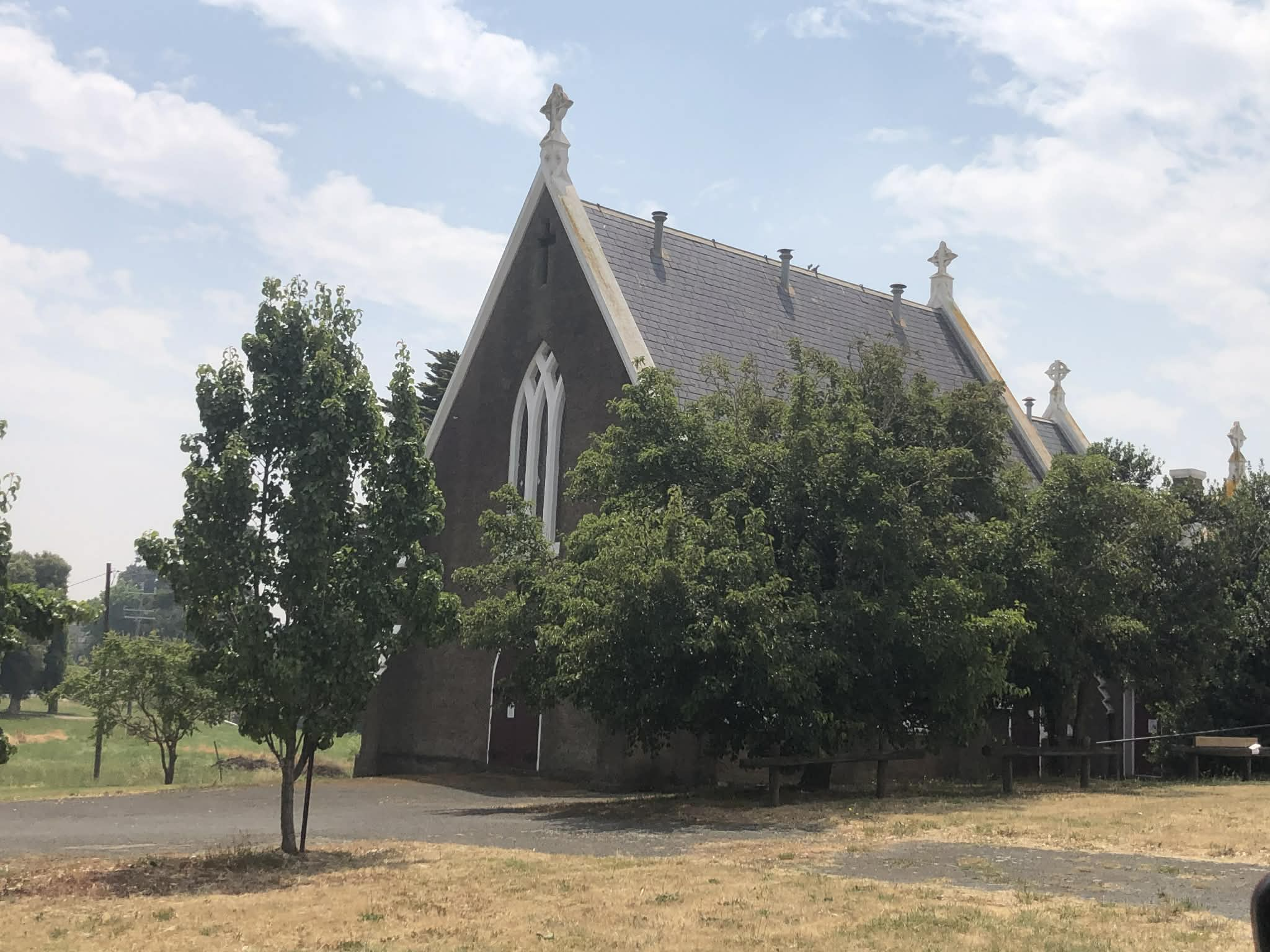
- St John the Baptist Catholic Church
- St John's Catholic Church
- 37°21′33″S 143°38′24″E
- Address: 2034 Sunraysia Highway, Waubra, Victoria
- Country: Australia
- Denomination: Roman Catholic

History
- Status: Church
- Dedication: John the Baptist

Architecture
- Functional status: Active
- Architectural type: Church
- Style: Gothic Revival
- Years built: 1869 (original section), 1911 (later additions)

Administration
- Diocese: Ballarat
- Parish: Wendouree

St John the Baptist's Church is a small, historic Roman Catholic church located in the town of Waubra, Victoria, Australia. The church, originally built in 1869 with later additions in 1911, serves the Catholic community in the region, and is part of the Parish of Wendouree, in the Catholic Diocese of Ballarat.

== History ==
The idea for a Catholic church in the town was brought forward by Irish settlers Lawrence Craven, John Lenane, Peter McNally, Edward and Richard Butler. Whilst the initial plot of land the church set was to be situated on was officially gazetted by the government for the use of Catholic church, someone had been residing there, and succeeded with maintaining his residence there. The church looked to the present corner site where the church is presently situated, but it was discovered that the land was already owned by an occupant. The occupant, who was also an Irishman, refused to move unless he was paid £100. Lawrence and his team ignored this offer and went to the property and erected a rough fence around the perimeter. Charles Shultge, an Anglican who assisted the Irishmen in collecting funds for the church construction, negotiated the disagreement between the two parties with the assistance of the government, and the original occupant was incentivised to move, eventually to the western part of the property.

The original five Irishmen set up a committee for channeling funds raised for the church, and met in the White Hart Hotel in 1866. They selected the Ballarat-based Reverend Dr. Moore as the church's pastor.

Once enough funds were raised, the church was erected in 1869, with the foundation stone being laid by Rev. Dr. Moore.

In 1911, the church was expanded, with the additions of a sanctuary and sacristy. This was commemorated in the laying of a foundation stone on Sunday 11 June 1911 by Rev. Joseph Higgins, the then Catholic Bishop of Ballarat.
