= Barkly, Victoria =

Barkly
- Town
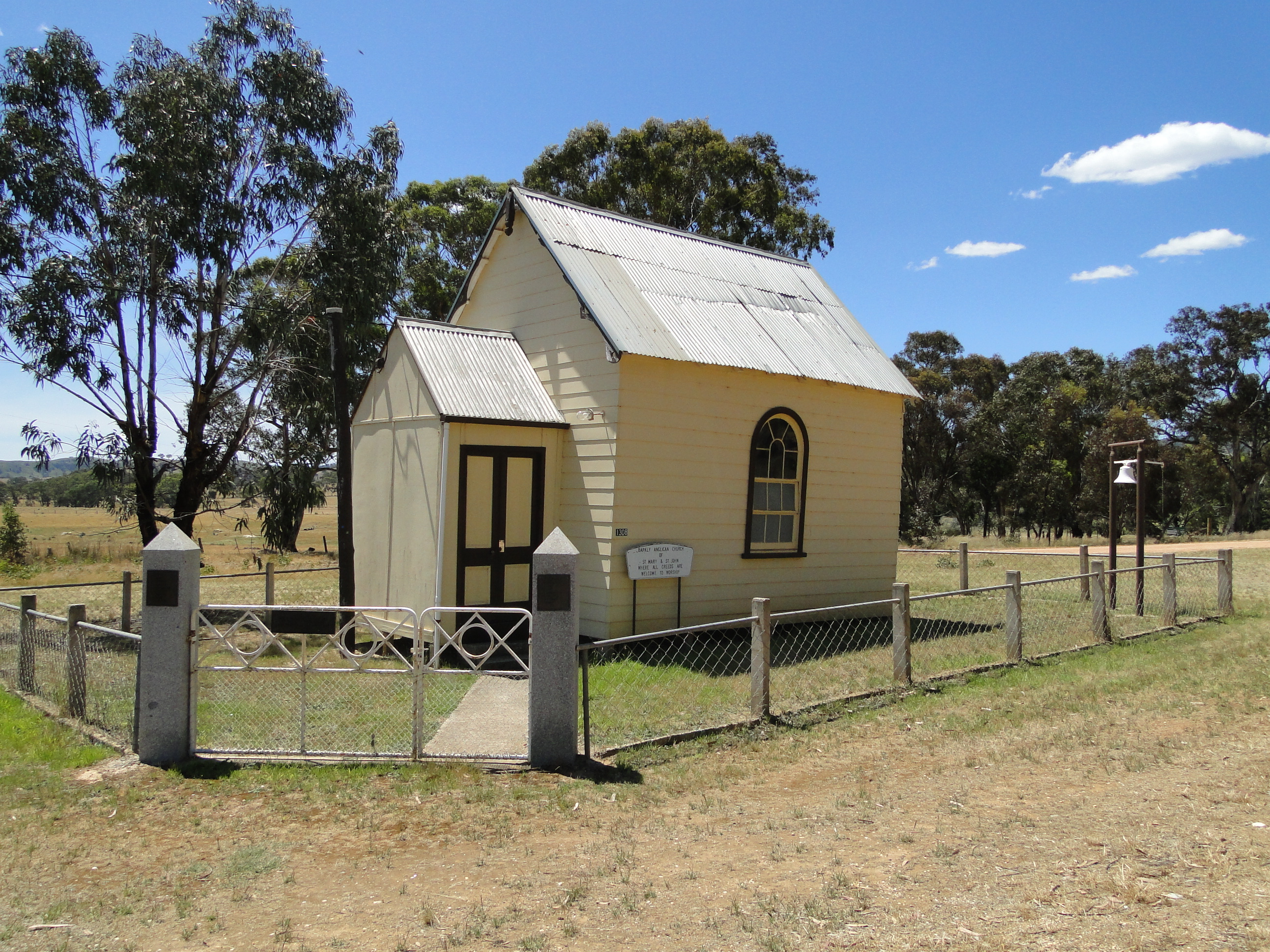
- Anglican church, Barkly

- Coordinates: 36°56′0″S 143°12′0″E
- Country: Australia
- State: Victoria
- LGA: Pyrenees Shire
- Location: 180 km (110 mi) NW of Melbourne

Government
  - State electorate: Ripon
  - Federal division: Mallee
- Elevation: 270 m (890 ft)

Population
  - Total: 43 (2016 census)
- Postcode: 3381

Barkly is a locality in Victoria, Australia, about 180 kilometres (110 mi) northwest of Melbourne. It is near the intersection of the road from Landsborough to Redbank, and the road from Frenchmans to St Arnaud. It is close to the west boundary of the St Arnaud Range National Park. It is located in the Pyrenees Shire. At the 2016 census Barkly had a population of 43.

The area was first called the Navarre Diggings when gold was discovered there in June 1859 by a group led by James Law (1827-1910). It was about 6 miles (10 km) from the Navarre township. There was an immediate goldrush and there were soon about 700 people on the diggings. At the peak of the rush, there were over 6000 people in the area digging for gold.

James Law, who had come to Australia from Scotland, received a reward of 150 pounds for finding gold. Other members of his group, John Fewster, W.R. Marshall and George Mill also were rewarded.

The name was changed to Barkly on 1 November 1861, after the Governor of Victoria, Sir Henry Barkly. Navarre Rush Post Office opened on 1 June 1861, was renamed Barkly in November 1861 and closed in 1981.

A school was started, the Barkly Common School.

A cemetery, now called the Pioneer Cemetery was established close to the original diggings. The town of Barkly developed about two miles from this area, and a new cemetery was begun.

Barkly has a small Anglican church, a hall, and a few scattered houses. The school has been closed and the buildings removed. There is a rose and lavender farm which is open to the public at various times during the year. A headstone was placed on James Law's grave on 5 May 1985. In 1996 a memorial stone was placed at the site of the first gold discovery.

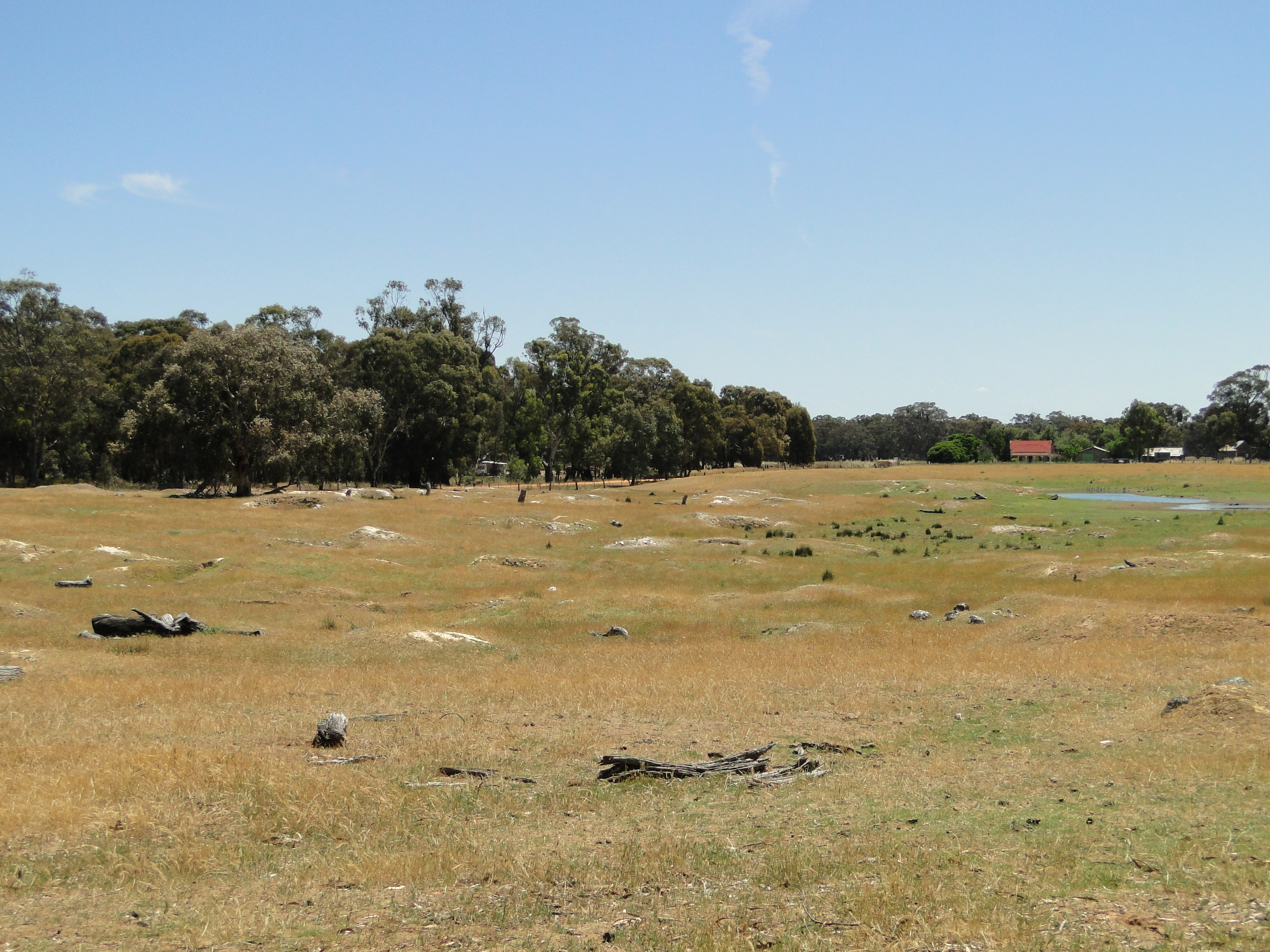
Old gold diggings at Barkly

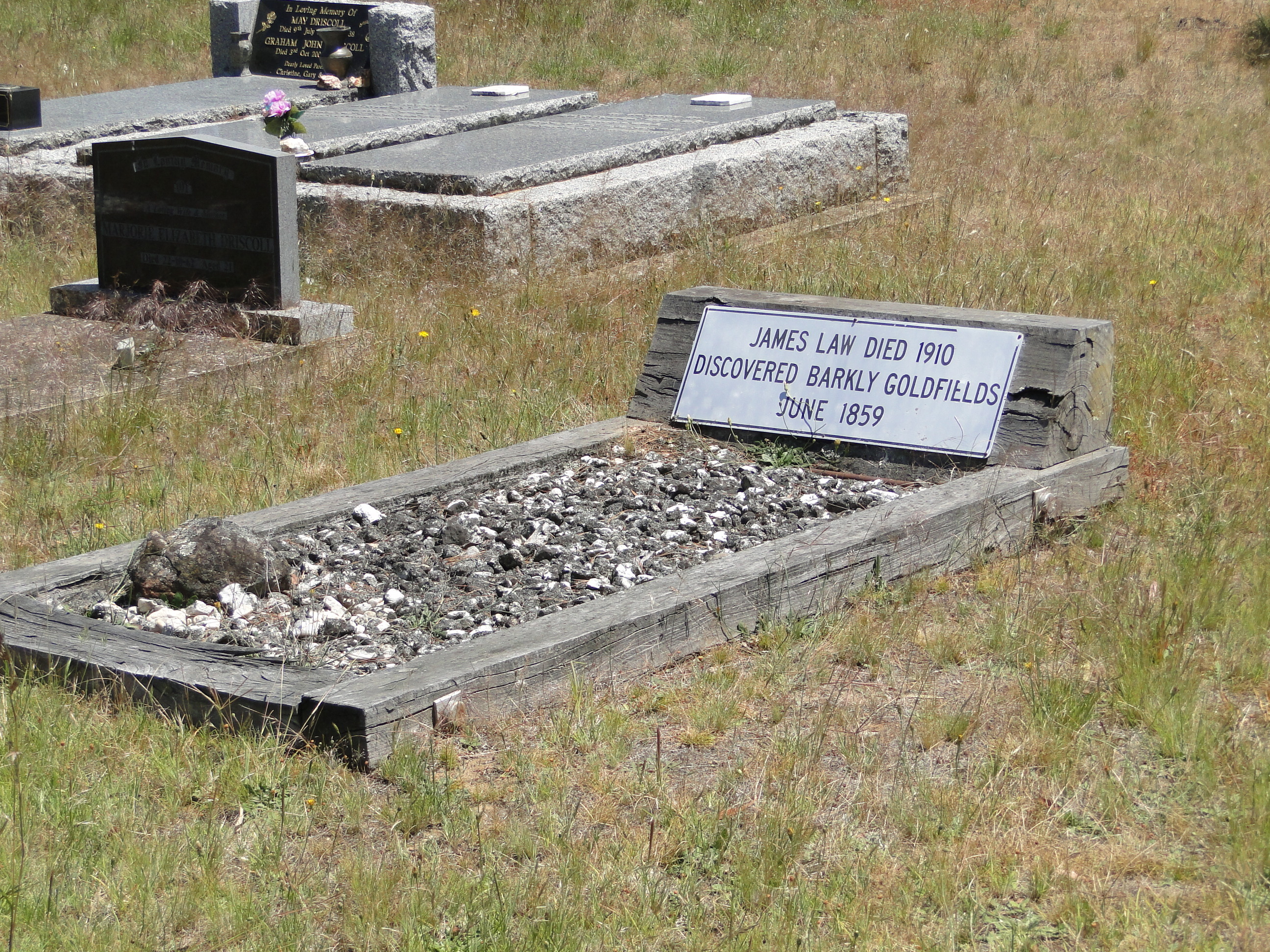
James Law's grave in the Barkly Cemetery

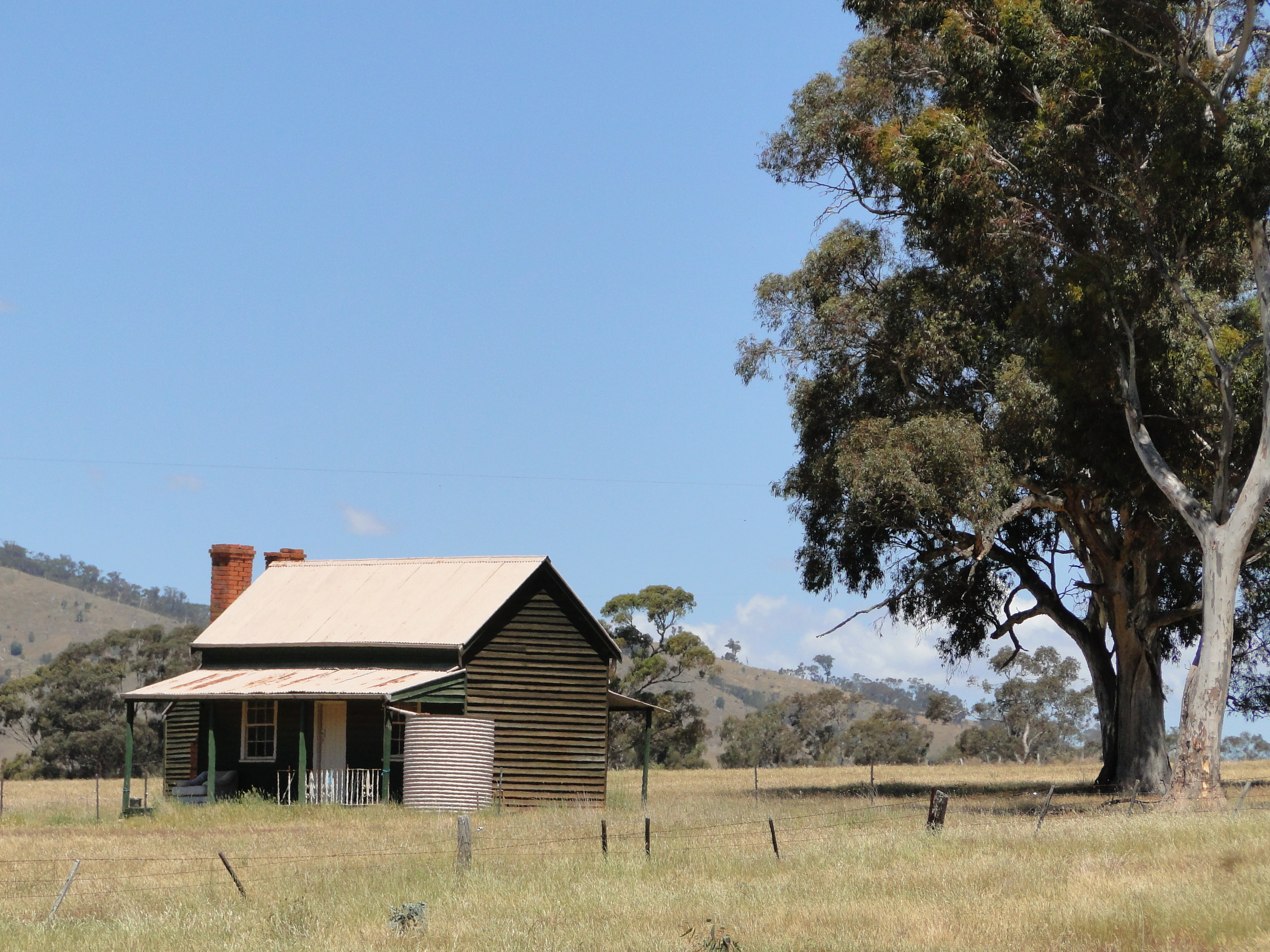
Old cottage at Barkly
