= Holy Trinity Anglican Church, Waubra =

Closed Anglican church in Waubra, Victoria, Australia

- Holy Trinity Church of England Church
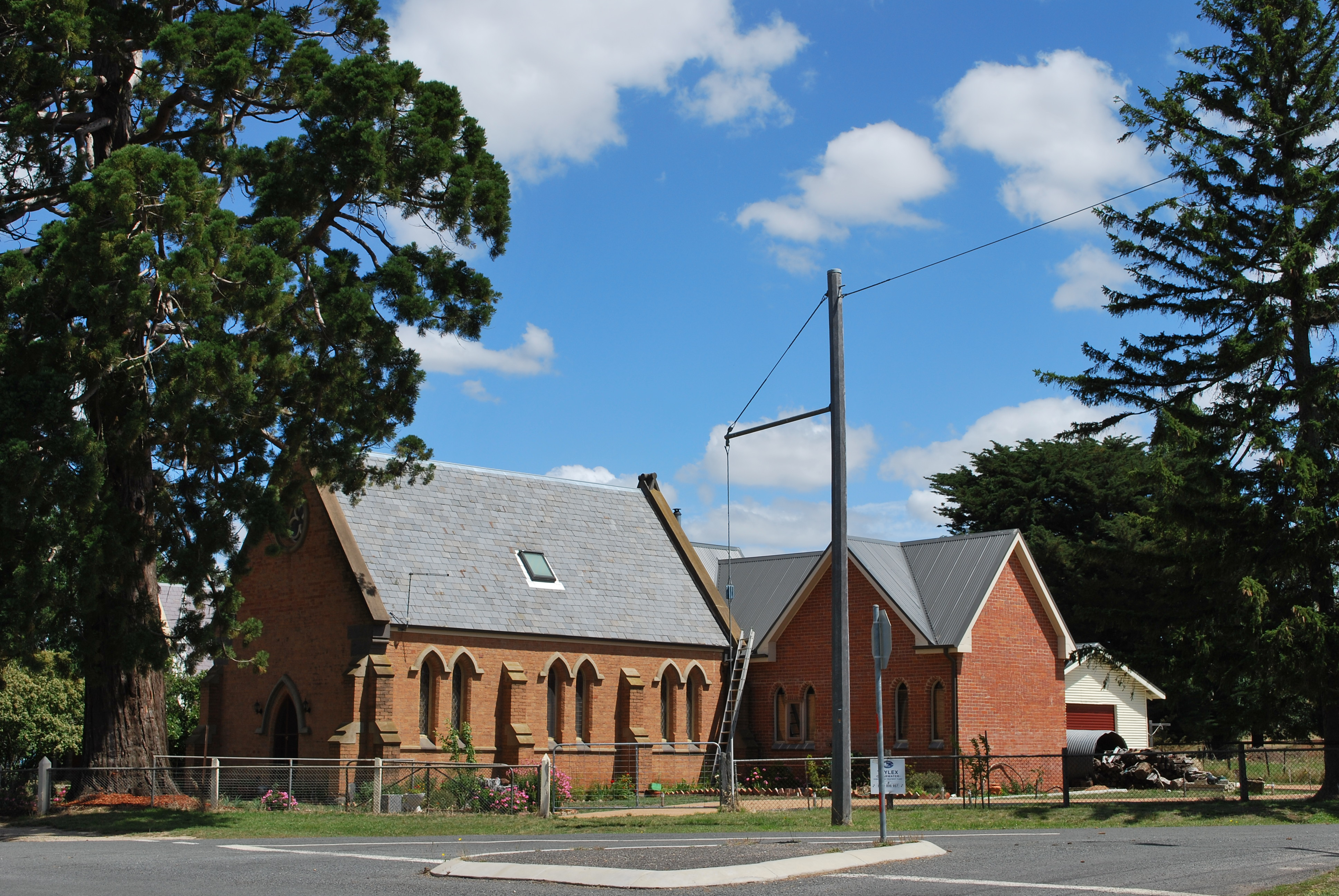
- Holy Trinity Anglican Church
- Holy Trinity Anglican Church, Waubra
- 37°21′27″S 143°38′13″E
- Location: 2067 Sunraysia Highway, Waubra, Victoria
- Country: Australia
- Denomination: Anglican Church of Australia

History
- Status: Closed (private residence)
- Dedication: Holy Trinity

Architecture
- Architect: Henry R. Caselli
- Style: Gothic Revival
- Completed: 1863

Administration
- Province: Victoria
- Diocese: Ballarat

Holy Trinity Anglican Church is a historic former Anglican church located in the town of Waubra, Victoria, Australia. The church, which opened in 1863, served the local Anglican community until it was put up for sale in 2017, where it has since been converted into a private residence. The church was once a member of the Parish of Springmount, within the Anglican Diocese of Ballarat.

== History ==
The church was officially opened on Sunday 27 December 1863, with the Rev. Mr. Potter preaching the inaugural service. The church was designed by Henry R. Caselli, an architect based in Ballarat, and built by Waubra-based Mr Joseph Frazer. The building, Gothic in style, had a seating capacity of 150 people, and has five double windows along its sides, an oriel window above the eastern entrance, and a three compartment window at the western entrance. The church also contained a gallery for the choir, and a roof supported two principals protruding from stone corbels.

A corrugated iron fence was constructed around the church in 1895.

The church was put up for sale on 7 November 2017, for $395,000. It has since been converted into a private residence.
