= Mount Lonarch =

Mount Lonarch Victoria
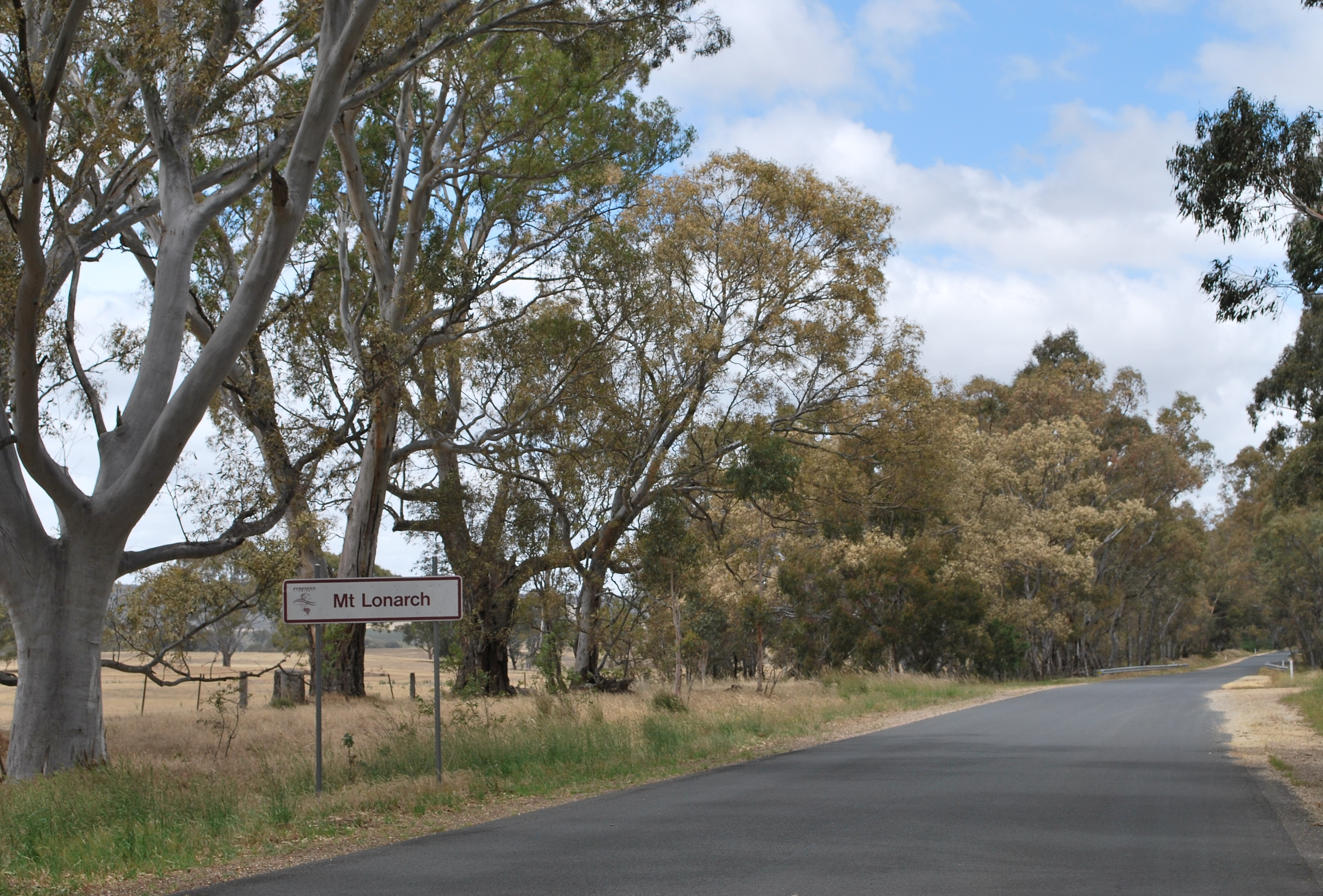
- Entering Mount Lonarch

- Coordinates: 37°16′06″S 143°22′29″E
- Population: 42 (2016 census)
- Postcode(s): 3468
- Elevation: 721 m (2,365 ft)
- Location: 177 km (110 mi) NW of Melbourne; 65 km (40 mi) NW of Ballarat; 22 km (14 mi) N of Beaufort
- LGA(s): Pyrenees Shire
- State electorate(s): Ripon
- Federal division(s): Wannon

Mount Lonarch is a locality in central Victoria, Australia. The locality is in the Shire of Pyrenees local government area, 177 kilometres (110 mi) north west of the state capital, Melbourne.

At the 2016 census, Mount Lonarch had a population of 42.
