= Waubra =

- Town
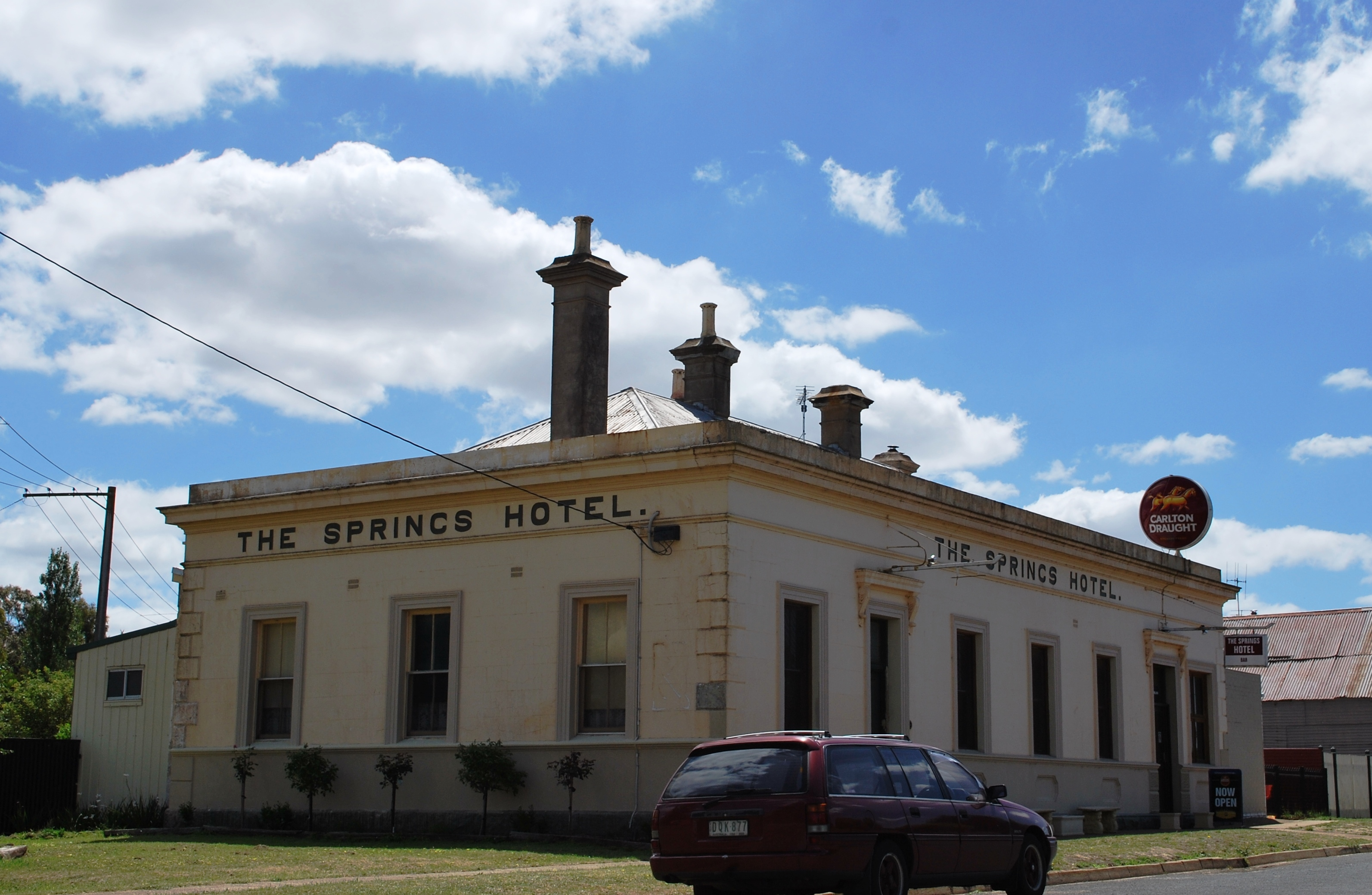
- The Springs Hotel at Waubra.

- Coordinates: 37°22′0″S 143°39′0″E
- Country: Australia
- State: Victoria
- LGAs: City of Ballarat; Pyrenees Shire; Hepburn Shire
- Location: 146 km (91 mi) WNW of Melbourne; 33 km (21 mi) NW of Ballarat; 15 km (9.3 mi) SE of Lexton

Government
  - State electorate: Ripon
  - Federal division: Wannon

Population
  - Total: 308 (2021 census)
- Postcode: 3352

Waubra (formerly known as The Springs) is a town in Victoria, Australia. The town is on the Sunraysia Highway, 33 kilometres (21 mi) north west of Ballarat and split between the Pyrenees Shire, Hepburn Shire and City of Ballarat local government areas. At the 2021 census, Waubra and the surrounding area had a population of 308.

The town is known for the Waubra Wind Farm, one of the largest windfarms in Australia. It was the biggest wind farm in the Southern Hemisphere on completion.

The town was named after the local Wathaurong tribe "Waubra" that populated the area prior to European settlement.

== History ==
The original inhabitants were the "Waubra" a Wathaurong indigenous Australian tribe.

Thomas Mitchell was the first European to visit the area, and during his 1839 journey, planted a flag on nearby Mount Mitchell.

The first settler was Mr John Warne who established a pastoral run in 1857. The settlement was originally known as "The Springs". The Post Office opened on 20 April 1860.

The railway came in October 1888 with the opening of a Victorian Railways 5 ft 3 in (1,600 mm) gauge branchline. It was renamed Waubra in 1889. In 1931, passenger services were withdrawn and the line continued as a "goods only" line through to its closure in January 1968.

The centenary of the town was celebrated in 1939 marking 100 years since Major Mitchell's sighting of the area.

== Culture ==
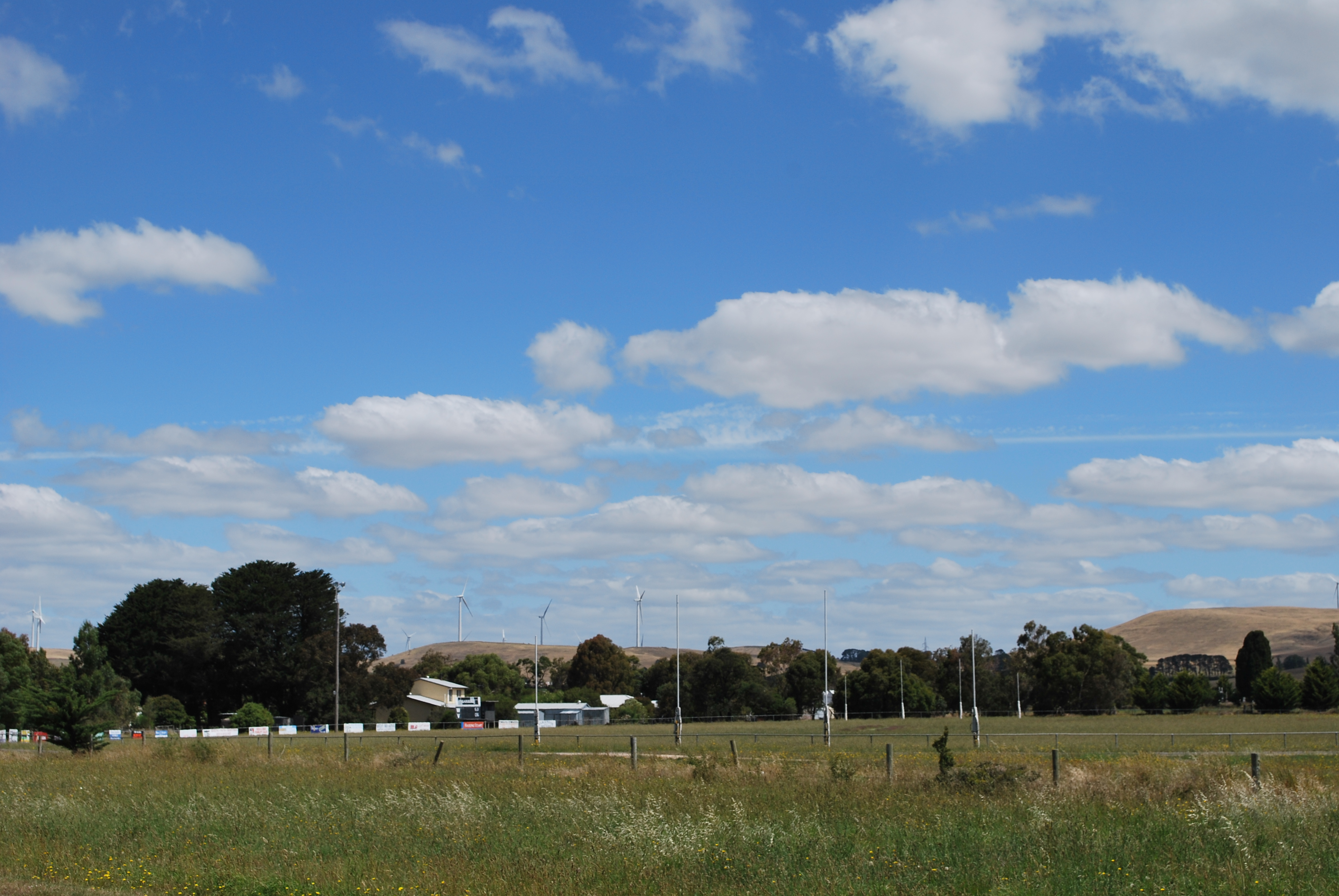
Recreation reserve (wind farm is visible in background)

The Waubra Kangaroos football team competes in the Central Highlands Football League.

Since 2010, the town has celebrated an annual Community Festival. It began as the Waubra Windfarm Festival and was sponsored by Acciona Energy, the name changed to the Waubra Windfarm Community Festival in 2011 and in 2012 became the Waubra Community Festival & Farmers Market. It has attracted large crowds and is held at the recreation reserve.

The town contains several church buildings, including St John's Catholic Church, Holy Trinity Anglican Church and St David's Uniting Church.

== Economy ==
Waubra's economy is based on agriculture and associated services, more than 38% of residents are farmers. The farming is mostly livestock although a number of wineries operate in the district. Due to the proximity to Ballarat and struggling local industry, many people commute to the city by motor vehicle for work - the 2016 census found that 67.5% of employed people travelled by car (either as driver or as passenger).

Facilities in the town include a general store and a primary school.
