= Amphitheatre, Victoria =

Amphitheatre
- Town
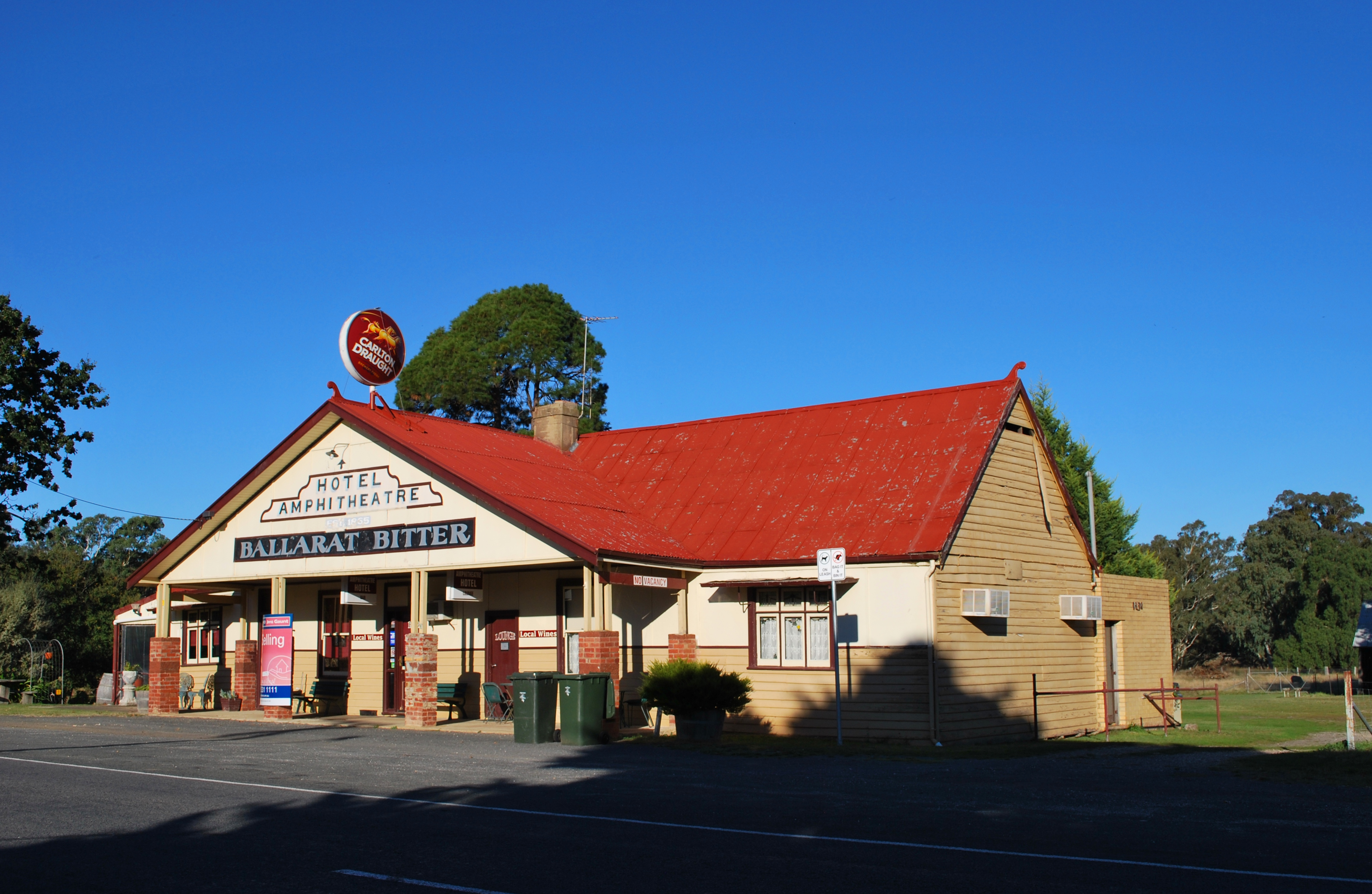
- The former Amphitheatre Hotel around the time of its closure in 2011

- Coordinates: 37°10′0″S 143°25′0″E
- Country: Australia
- State: Victoria
- LGA: Pyrenees Shire
- Location: 183 km (114 mi) NW of Melbourne; 69 km (43 mi) NW of Ballarat; 49 km (30 mi) NE of Ararat; 13 km (8.1 mi) S of Avoca

Government
  - State electorate: Ripon
  - Federal division: Mallee

Population
  - Total: 223 (2021 census)
- Postcode: 3468

Amphitheatre is a town in Victoria, Australia. It is located on the Pyrenees Highway in the Pyrenees Shire, south-west of Avoca. At the 2021 census, Amphitheatre and the surrounding area had a population of 223.

The Avoca River rises near the town, at the foot of Mount Lonarch. Gold was discovered in the area in 1853, and a settlement was established at Amphitheatre as a result. By 1857, the Cobb and Co Telegraph Line of stage coaches passed through Amphitheatre on the Maryborough to Ararat line.

A post office opened on 22 June 1859.

The Avoca-Ararat railway, which opened in 1890, included a station at Amphitheatre. The station was closed, along with the line, in 1959. Although the line was eventually reopened, the station was not.

Amphitheatre has a primary school.

== Town landmarks ==
=== Amphitheatre Anzac Avenue ===
The Amphitheatre Anzac Avenue was planted on 7 June 1917. The girlfriend, fiancée or parent of each soldier who enlisted from Amphitheatre to fight in the Great War planted a tree in their honour. A brass plaque with each soldier's name and service number was later affixed to identify the trees. The avenue forms the northern approach to Amphitheatre and, as a mature avenue, provides a distinctive character to the town.

=== Amphitheatre Hotel ===
The town's most-prominent landmark is the Amphitheatre Hotel. Brothers Henry Edward Bird and John Bird, immigrants from Somerset, England, established the hotel under the title of 'The Amphitheatre Inn' to service the gold mining community in 1854–5. The original parts of the hotel are of timber construction, clad in weatherboards with Morewood and Rogers metal roof tiles. The tiles remain a rare example of metal roofing material used before the introduction of corrugated iron to Australia in the 1850s.

The Bird brothers erected a six-horse stable beside the hotel by 1857 as a staging post for the Cobb and Co line. This remains as part of the hotel complex. The hotel was robbed at gunpoint by a gang of highway robbers in 1857. A road bridge erected to cross the nearby Amphitheatre Creek caused a change in the alignment of the highway in 1862. As a result, the hotel no longer faced the main road. The Bird brothers moved the building 50 metres to face the new road alignment by 1865 and remodelled it, calling it 'Amphitheatre Hotel'.

Throughout the 1860s and 1870s, the hotel supported local administration by hosting coronial inquests, land auctions, mining board elections, and recreation club meetings. The addition of a large meeting room in the 1870s contributed to this support to the community. John Bird left the hotel to take over the Pyrenees Family Hotel at Lexton, Victoria in 1883. John's brother Henry remained the proprietor until 1914, leasing it to various publicans as he assumed pastoral interests. A fire broke out in the hotel on 3 February 1914 that threatened its total destruction, but it was extinguished in time.

The hotel passed to Henry Bird's son Fred on Henry's death in 1919, and Fred Bird sold it in 1924, concluding 70 years of ownership in the family. The hotel passed through a number of owners until its licence was not renewed in 2011, and the establishment was used as an ice-creamery and B&B. It is now a private residence and retains many of its gold rush era features, including the bar cut from a slab of Australian red cedar (Toona ciliata).

=== Mechanics' Institute Hall ===
The Mechanics' Institute Hall was built in 1901. Land was reserved for the purpose in 1895. The hall contained a library and provided a larger space for public meetings and community events than the Amphitheatre Hotel. It doubled as the town's cinema during the 1920 and 1930s and has hosted dances, private functions and public entertainments by local and visiting artists.

=== War memorial arch ===
The returned Amphitheatre soldiers of the Great War erected a granite arch 'to the memory of fallen comrades' during the 1920s. The arch is located in front of the Mechanics' Institute Hall. The local community added two brass plaques to the memorial on 28 October 2002 listing the names of all who served from the town in both World Wars.

=== Motor garages ===
Amphitheatre has three historic motor garages. This much-photographed trio no longer serves petrol and is a reminder of the days when cars had shorter range and roads conditions were tougher on them. Dridan's Esso garage was a small service station, while Shannon's Golden Fleece garage offered full driveway service, and Whytecross's Plume garage was converted from the former blacksmith's shop associated with the Amphitheatre Hotel.

=== Bakery Park ===
A recreation reserve called Bakery Park is situated on the Pyrenees Highway. It was improved in 1988 by members of the community as an Australian Bicentennial Project. A horse-drawn cart used by a local sawmiller in the 1920s is displayed in the park.

=== 45 Bailey Street ===
Amphitheatre's most prominent house is situated at 45 Bailey Street (the Pyrenees Highway). The house began as the cottage of store keepers Henry and Eliza Spiers in 1860, and they extended it substantially in 1876, adding a second storey. A further two-storey extension was added in 1984. The brick residence retains many of its period features, including wrought-iron veranda balustrades and marble fireplaces.
