= Chute, Victoria =

Chute Victoria
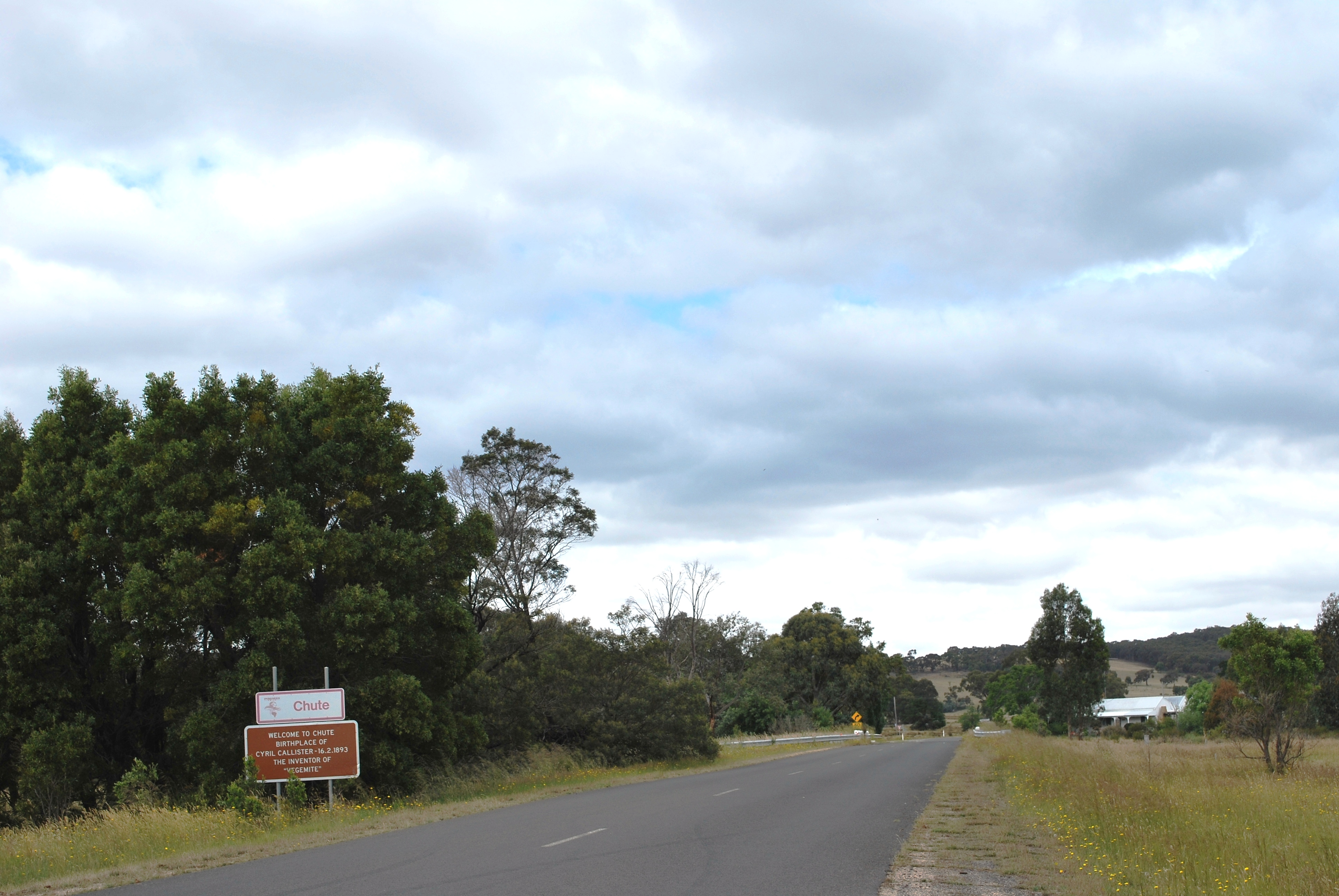
- Entering Chute

- Coordinates: 37°20′00″S 143°23′09″E
- Population: 18 (2016 census)
- Postcode(s): 3373
- Location: 173 km (107 mi) W of Melbourne; 61 km (38 mi) W of Ballarat; 13 km (8 mi) N of Beaufort
- LGA(s): Pyrenees Shire
- State electorate(s): Ripon
- Federal division(s): Mallee; Wannon

Chute is a locality in central Victoria, Australia. The locality is in the Shire of Pyrenees local government area, 173 kilometres (107 mi) west of the state capital, Melbourne.

At the 2016 census, Chute had a population of 18.
