= Lexton, Victoria =

Lexton Victoria
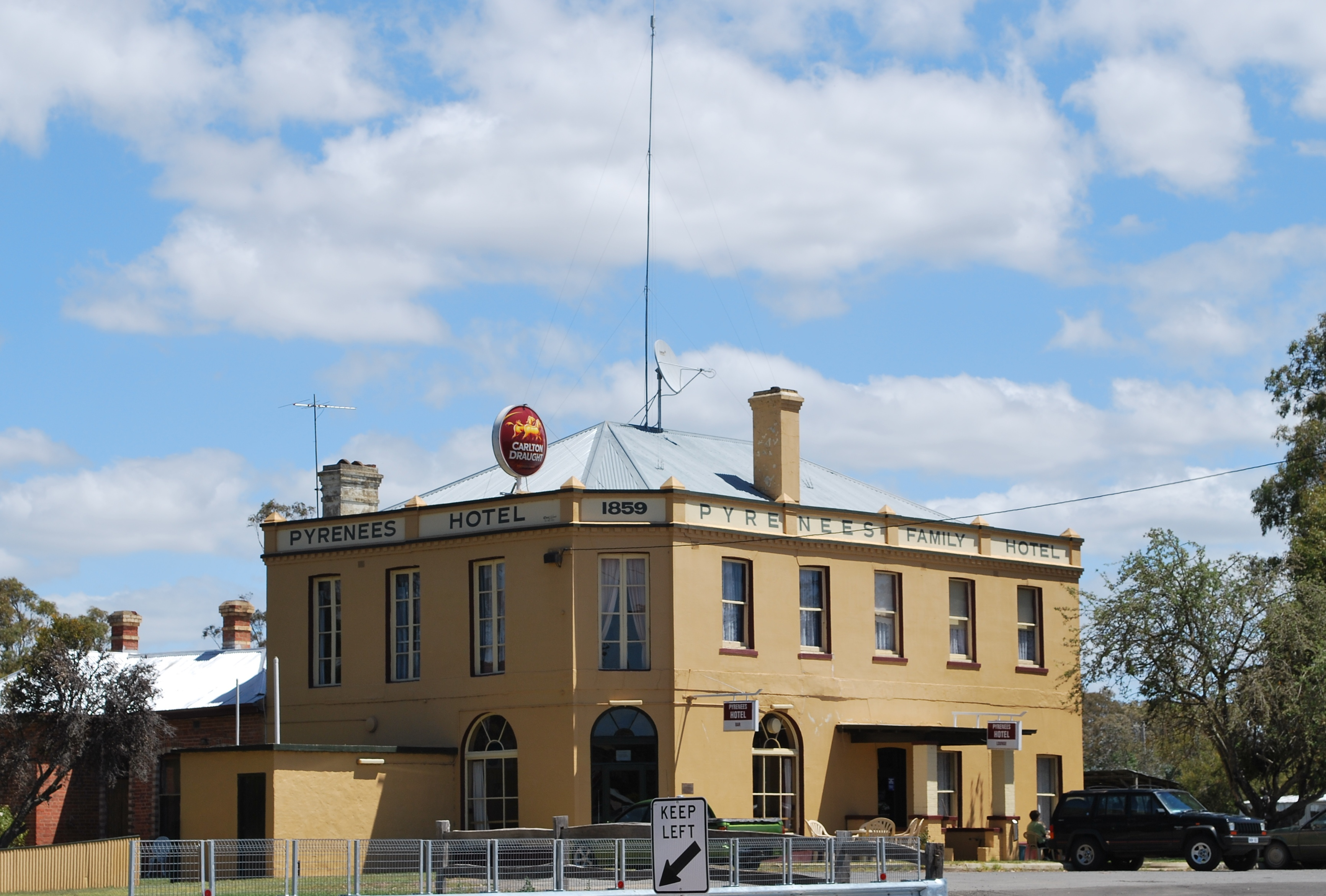
- Pyrenees Family Hotel

- Coordinates: 37°15′7″S 143°31′1″E
- Population: 231 (2016 census)
- Postcode(s): 3352
- Location: 144 km (89 mi) NW of Melbourne; 48 km (30 mi) NW of Ballarat; 23 km (14 mi) S of Avoca
- LGA(s): Pyrenees Shire
- State electorate(s): Ripon
- Federal division(s): Wannon

Lexton is a town in western Victoria, Australia, in the Shire of Pyrenees local government area. It is on the Sunraysia Highway, 161 kilometres (100 mi) northwest of the state capital Melbourne. At the 2016 Australian census, Lexton and the surrounding area had a population of 231.

== History ==
The Post Office opened in the area on 1 July 1848 as Burn Bank and was renamed Lexton in 1854 when the township was settled.

Diarist Charles Evans stopped in the area in 1854 on his way to the Avoca goldfields and described his visit as such:

About midday we arrived at Burn Bank. The village or town or whatever they call it looks exceedingly pretty & picturesque from the road. It is situated in a rich pleasant valley, possesses two Inns, two stores & about a dozen houses. We found our missing friends at the Inn waiting in hungry impatience for the announcement of dinner. It appears that the only food they have had since they left us was a loaf which a samaritan in a dray divided with them. Their appetites therefore were a source of no small wonder & admiration to the landlord.

== Today ==
The town has an Australian Rules football team competing in the Maryborough Castlemaine District Football League.

Golfers play at the course of the Lexton Golf Club at the Recreation Reserve.

Lexton is host to the annual Rainbow Serpent Festival.

== Notable people ==
Darren Jolly - Former Collingwood football player
