= Landsborough, Victoria =

Town in Victoria, Australia

Landsborough is a rural town in Western Victoria, Australia, approximately 32 kilometres (20 mi) east of the town of Stawell. It was originally founded as a gold-mining settlement, but now is known for its historical buildings, agricultural industry, and proximity to the Pyrenees mountain range. Today, Landsborough is a key hub for sheep grazing, viticulture, and outdoor tourism. In the 2021 census, the population of Landsborough recorded a population of 200 residents.

== History ==
In 1856, gold was discovered in the region, sparking a rush of prospectors to the area, then known as "Malakoff Lead." The name "Malakoff" is believed to be derived from the Battle of Malakoff, fought during the Crimean War in 1855. A significant gold discovery in 1862 helped cement the town's foundation, with the population reaching approximately 8,000-9,000 at its peak.

The town was named in honor of William Landsborough, an Australian explorer who passed through the area while searching for Burke and Wills in 1861. The main street in Landsborough is named Burke Street, and the adjacent street is named Wills Street, in tribute to the explorers.

Landsborough's first primary school opened in 1860 to accommodate the growing population. By 1862, a police lockup was established, which is still on display today. A local gazetteer from 1865 noted the presence of several hotels, a brewery, a quartz battery, an insurance office, and a bank in the town.

As the gold supply dwindled in the 1880s, agriculture began to replace mining as the dominant industry. The Catholic Church was built in 1887, and by 1901, the police added mounted police stables, which remain in public view. According to The Australian Handbook (1903), the town was described as primarily agricultural, with a population of around 300 people.

In 1904, the Anglican Church was constructed, and a railway station opened in 1914, which remained operational until 1954. In 1917, an ornate Catholic presbytery was built, and in 1922, the town's public hall was completed. The General Store, operated by the Hodgetts family for four generations, opened in 1924. By the 1940s, the town's economy had shifted primarily to sheep grazing and grain farming, with the wool boom significantly influencing the local economy. Mixed agriculture, timber milling, and vineyards all contributed to the economy until the 1990s, when viticulture saw a resurgence.

== Amenities ==
Landsborough features a Memorial Recreation Reserve, which includes several facilities such as a Gate of Remembrance, a Community Centre, tennis and netball courts, and a football oval, which was formerly home to the Landsborough Hawks football team. Other local amenities include a caravan park, an information resource centre, a swimming pool, a playground, a cemetery, a golf course, and a CFA fire station. The town also has a post office, police station, a hotel, a general store, and several wineries.

== Tourism and recreation ==
Landsborough's location in the Pyrenees Ranges makes it a popular destination for outdoor recreation. The area is known for activities such as motorbike trail riding, horse riding, four-wheel driving, birdwatching, hiking, mountain biking and Bush Doof Rave events. In 2003, the town hosted the Tom Quilty Gold Cup at the Memorial Recreation Reserve, attracting equestrians from across the country.

== Viticulture ==
Landsborough's terroir, characterized by decomposed quartz loam soils and a cool, dry climate, provides ideal conditions for grape cultivation. While grape growing began intermittently before the 1940s, the town's wine industry experienced significant growth in the 1990s. Andrija and Joyce Horvat, of Croatian heritage, moved to Landsborough in 1980 and established a winery. Despite initial skepticism from local farmers, the success of their venture, coupled with the arrival of Southcorp in 1994, helped establish the town as a wine-growing region. In 2007, French winemaker Michel Chapoutier established the Tournon Estate, a biodynamic vineyard, further solidifying Landsborough's reputation as a premium wine region.
