= Snake Valley, Victoria =

Snake Valley
- Town
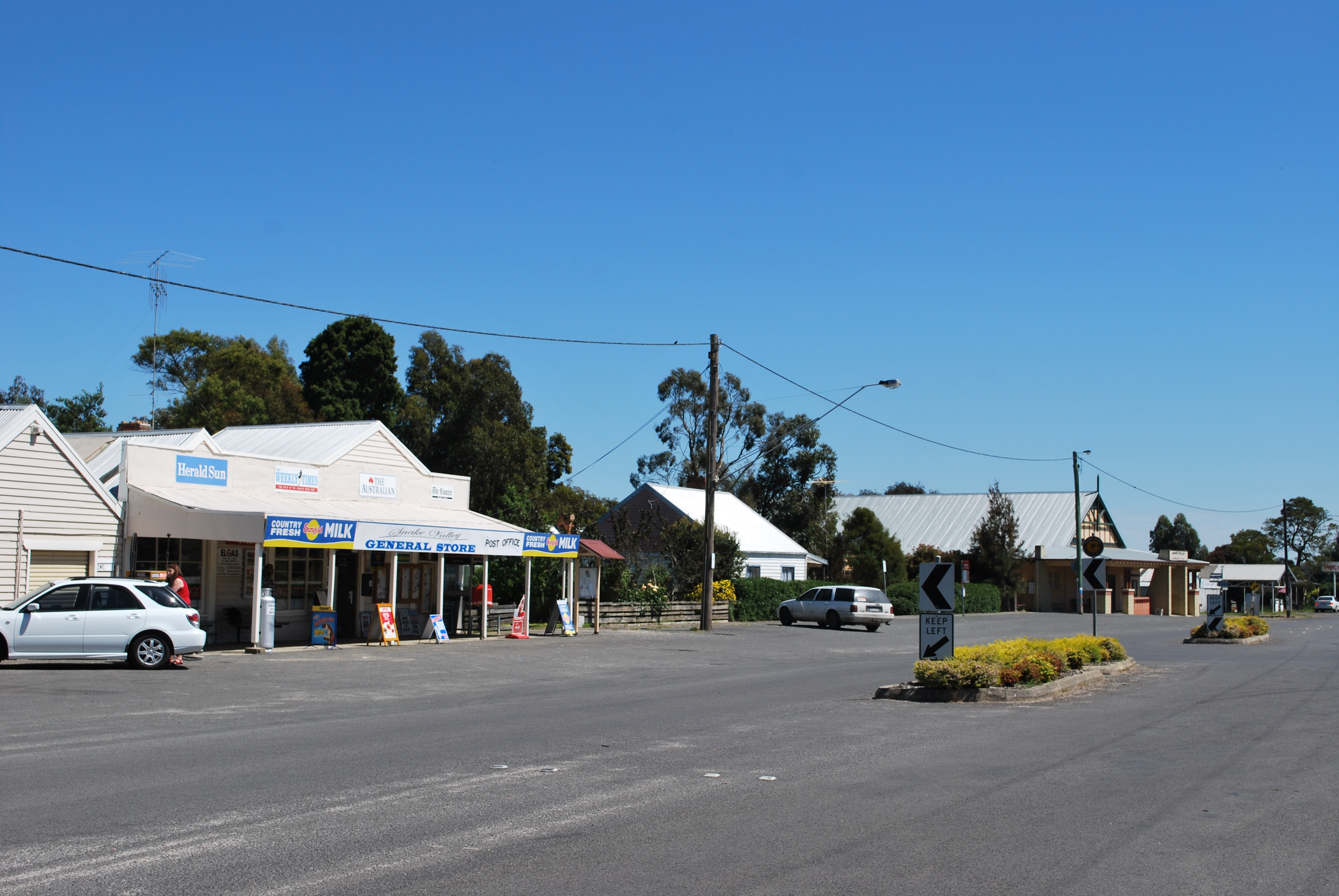
- Main street of Snake Valley

- Coordinates: 37°36′43″S 143°35′04″E
- Country: Australia
- State: Victoria
- LGA: Pyrenees Shire
- Location: 154 km (96 mi) W of Melbourne; 41 km (25 mi) W of Ballarat; 52 km (32 mi) E of Ararat; 48 km (30 mi) S of Avoca

Government
  - State electorate: Ripon
  - Federal division: Wannon

Population
  - Total: 743 (2016 census)
- Postcode: 3351

Snake Valley is a town in central Western Victoria, Australia, on Linton-Carngham Road, 27 kilometres (17 mi) west of Ballarat and 153 kilometres (95 mi) west of Melbourne, in the Shire of Pyrenees. A post office was opened on 1 March 1859. At the 2016 Census, Snake Valley had a population of 743, up from 329 in 2006.

== History ==
The Indigenous Australians inhabited Snake Valley for tens of thousands of years before Europeans arrived. The Carringum balug people of the Wathaurong nation were on the land surrounding Snake Valley/Carngham district. The nearby town of Carngham therefore appears to be the name of the Aboriginal people that originally lived in the area. They called Snake Valley itself nimbuck or nimlock.

In 1857, a gold rush occurred in the area of Snake Valley and Carngham. The town reputedly got its name when a miner found snakes in a sinking shaft. However, settlement preceded this as a primary school was established in 1854.

The town was exclusively a gold mining area for at least ten years. In 1865, Bailliere’s Victorian gazetteer recorded Snake Valley as having five hotels, a mechanics' institute and a Court of Petty Sessions. In the 1880s, the Victorian municipal directory described Snake Valley as "a straggling mining township with outlying farming districts" and recorded five churches.

In 2013, a grass fire in a farming region west of Ballarat destroyed four homes in Snake Valley. Over one hundred people took refuge in the community hall.

== Religion ==
Snake Valley has churches of five Christian denominations, although not all of them are being used as places of worship. The Anglican Church of Holy Trinity is located on Linton-Carngham Rd and is a part of the Woady Yaloak Mission District, Anglican Diocese of Ballarat. The Catholic St Brigid's is located on the corner of Linton-Carngham Road and is a part of St Peter's Parish, Linton. The Carngham Uniting Church on the Linton-Carngham Road has hosted organ recitals as part of the Organs of the Ballarat Goldfields Festival.

== Sport and recreation ==
Snake Valley has football, netball and cricket teams as well as an irregular 12 hole golf course.

== Education ==
Woady Primary School was formed in 1994 as the amalgamation of Scarsdale, Smythesdale, Snake Valley and Ross Creek schools, providing multiple campuses. Secondary students must travel to other places such as Ballarat or Beaufort for education.

== Community ==
For a small population, Snake Valley has a large number of active community groups and organisations:

- Snake Valley & District Historical Society,
- Snake Valley Astronomical Association (SVAA),
- Snake Valley-Carngham Branch Friends of the RSL,
- Snake Valley CFA Auxiliary & Community Fireguard,
- Mag Dam Reserve Group,
- Snake Valley CERT (Community Emergency Response),
- Carngham Recreation Reserve,
- Woady Yaloak Primary School Parents and Friends Group,
- Snake Valley & District CFA,
- Snake Valley Landcare,
- Snake Valley Playgroup,
- St. Brigid's Altar Society.

== Economy ==
The local economy is agricultural in nature. It is dominated by broad acre farming, grazing, and timber industries.

The township also contains a general store and a hotel.

== Transport ==
Snake Valley is serviced by a twice-weekly bus service from Ballarat, which runs on Mondays and Fridays. The main means of transport is private vehicle.

== Notable people ==
John "Jack" Worrall, Australian rules footballer and cricketer was born at Chinaman's Flat in the locality in 1861.
