= Electoral results for the district of Ripon =

Victoria, Australia, district election results

This is a list of electoral results for the Electoral district of Ripon in Victorian state elections. The 2018 result was the subject of a legal challenge by the second placed Labor candidate.

== Members for Ripon ==
First incarnation (1945–1955)
Member	Party	Term
Ernie Morton	Labor	1945–1947
Rutherford Guthrie	Liberal	1947–1950
Ernie Morton	Labor	1950–1955
Second incarnation (1976–present)
Member	Party	Term
Tom Austin	Liberal	1976–1992
Steve Elder	Liberal	1992–1999
Joe Helper	Labor	1999–2014
Louise Staley	Liberal	2014–2022
Martha Haylett	Labor	2022–present

== Election results ==
=== Elections in the 2020s ===
2022 Victorian state election: Ripon
Party	Candidate	Votes	%	±%
Labor	Martha Haylett	16,321	38.5	−2.5
Liberal	Louise Staley	15,305	36.2	–0.6
Shooters, Fishers, Farmers	Luke Smith	3,606	8.5	+3.1
Greens	Earl James	2,524	6.0	+1.3
Family First	Craig George	1,316	3.1	+3.1
Animal Justice	Holly Sitters	1,145	2.7	+0.3
Justice	Wren Louise Wilson	940	2.2	−1.8
Independent	Wayne Rigg	872	2.1	+2.1
Independent	Bernard Quince	312	0.7	+0.7
Total formal votes		42,341	93.2	+1.3
Informal votes		3,111	6.8	−1.3
Turnout		45,452	89.5	
Two-party-preferred result
Labor	Martha Haylett	22,438	53.0	+0.2
Liberal	Louise Staley	19,903	47.0	–0.2
Labor notional hold		Swing	+0.2	

  - Note: 2021 redistribution turned this seat to a notional Labor seat with 2.8% margin.

=== Elections in the 2010s ===
2018 Victorian state election: Ripon
Party	Candidate	Votes	%	±%
Liberal	Louise Staley	15,594	38.93	+6.18
Labor	Sarah De Santis	15,280	38.15	+3.05
Shooters, Fishers, Farmers	Peter Fava	2,622	6.55	+6.55
Justice	Sandra Gibbs	1,929	4.82	+4.82
Greens	Serge Simic	1,667	4.16	−2.97
Democratic Labour	Peter Mulcahy	1,315	3.28	+2.06
Animal Justice	Anna Hills	835	2.08	+2.08
Independent	Jeff Truscott	377	0.94	+0.94
Victorian Socialists	Bronwyn Jennings	219	0.55	+0.55
Independent	Maria Mayer	217	0.54	+0.54
Total formal votes		40,055	91.74	−1.87
Informal votes		3,606	8.26	+1.87
Turnout		43,661	91.39	−3.39
Two-party-preferred result
Liberal	Louise Staley	20,035	50.02	−0.99
Labor	Sarah De Santis	20,020	49.98	+0.99
Liberal hold		Swing	−0.99	

2014 Victorian state election: Ripon
Party	Candidate	Votes	%	±%
Labor	Daniel McGlone	14,059	35.1	−3.7
Liberal	Louise Staley	13,118	32.8	+4.2
National	Scott Turner	7,342	18.3	−2.7
Greens	Rod May	2,856	7.1	+1.2
Family First	Danielle Fowler	897	2.2	−0.7
Country Alliance	Trevor Domaschenz	495	1.2	−1.5
Democratic Labour	Mitchell Lee	490	1.2	+1.2
Rise Up Australia	Peter Mulcahy	448	1.1	+1.1
Christians	Kevin Loiterton	352	0.9	+0.9
Total formal votes		40,057	93.6	−1.6
Informal votes		2,732	6.4	+1.6
Turnout		42,789	94.8	+1.8
Two-party-preferred result
Liberal	Louise Staley	20,329	50.8	−0.9
Labor	Daniel McGlone	19,728	49.2	+0.9
Liberal notional hold		Swing	−0.9	

  - Note: 2013 redistribution turned this seat to a notional Liberal seat with 1.6% margin.

2010 Victorian state election: Ripon
Party	Candidate	Votes	%	±%
Labor	Joe Helper	14,169	42.06	−4.73
Liberal	Vic Dunn	11,596	34.42	−0.84
National	Wendy McIvor	3,850	11.43	+2.92
Greens	Steve Morse	2,084	6.19	+0.23
Country Alliance	Scott Watts	1,211	3.59	+3.59
Family First	Jesse Boer	776	2.30	−1.18
Total formal votes		33,686	95.36	−0.94
Informal votes		1,640	4.64	+0.94
Turnout		35,326	93.90	−0.17
Two-party-preferred result
Labor	Joe Helper	17,777	52.72	−1.63
Liberal	Vic Dunn	15,940	47.28	+1.63
Labor hold		Swing	−1.63	

=== Elections in the 2000s ===
2006 Victorian state election: Ripon
Party	Candidate	Votes	%	±%
Labor	Joe Helper	15,461	46.8	−5.6
Liberal	Vic Dunn	11,650	35.3	+1.4
National	Robyn Smith	2,811	8.5	+0.7
Greens	Steven Morse	1,970	6.0	+1.2
Family First	Leanne Rawson	1,149	3.5	+3.5
Total formal votes		33,041	96.3	−0.9
Informal votes		1,268	3.7	+0.9
Turnout		34,309	94.1	
Two-party-preferred result
Labor	Joe Helper	17,964	54.3	−3.1
Liberal	Vic Dunn	15,090	45.7	+3.1
Labor hold		Swing	−3.1	

2002 Victorian state election: Ripon
Party	Candidate	Votes	%	±%
Labor	Joe Helper	17,439	52.4	+3.1
Liberal	Rob de Fegely	11,278	33.9	−9.5
National	Kevin Erwin	2,588	7.8	+2.8
Greens	Phil Millar	1,581	4.8	+4.6
Independent	John McCallum	367	1.1	+1.1
Total formal votes		33,253	97.2	−0.3
Informal votes		967	2.8	+0.3
Turnout		34,220	94.9	
Two-party-preferred result
Labor	Joe Helper	19,097	57.4	+5.8
Liberal	Rob de Fegely	14,155	42.6	−5.8
Labor hold		Swing	+5.8	

=== Elections in the 1990s ===
1999 Victorian state election: Ripon
Party	Candidate	Votes	%	±%
Labor	Joe Helper	15,579	52.6	+8.8
Liberal	Steve Elder	14,045	47.4	−5.0
Total formal votes		29,624	97.8	−0.5
Informal votes		668	2.2	+0.5
Turnout		30,292	95.5	
Labor gain from Liberal		Swing	+7.2	

1996 Victorian state election: Ripon
Party	Candidate	Votes	%	±%
Liberal	Steve Elder	15,678	52.5	−1.2
Labor	Hilary Hunt	13,098	43.8	+7.2
Call to Australia	Kingston Eldridge	564	1.9	+1.9
Natural Law	Martin Magee	548	1.8	+1.8
Total formal votes		29,888	98.3	+0.5
Informal votes		522	1.7	−0.5
Turnout		30,410	95.6	
Two-party-preferred result
Liberal	Steve Elder	16,303	54.6	−2.5
Labor	Hilary Hunt	13,567	45.4	+2.5
Liberal hold		Swing	−2.5	

1992 Victorian state election: Ripon
Party	Candidate	Votes	%	±%
Liberal	Steve Elder	16,028	53.7	−0.3
Labor	Hilary Hunt	10,922	36.6	−6.7
Independent	Gwenda Allgood	2,902	9.7	+9.7
Total formal votes		29,852	97.8	+0.0
Informal votes		664	2.2	−0.0
Turnout		30,516	96.5	
Two-party-preferred result
Liberal	Steve Elder	17,057	57.1	+1.1
Labor	Hilary Hunt	12,795	42.9	−1.1
Liberal hold		Swing	+1.1	

=== Elections in the 1980s ===
1988 Victorian state election: Ripon
Party	Candidate	Votes	%	±%
Liberal	Tom Austin	16,120	56.90	+0.38
Labor	John McQuilten	12,208	43.10	−0.38
Total formal votes		28,328	97.59	−0.66
Informal votes		699	2.41	+0.66
Turnout		29,027	94.62	−0.88
Liberal hold		Swing	+0.38	

1985 Victorian state election: Ripon
Party	Candidate	Votes	%	±%
Liberal	Tom Austin	15,861	56.5	+2.1
Labor	John McQuilten	12,204	43.5	−2.0
Total formal votes		28,065	98.2	
Informal votes		501	1.8	
Turnout		28,566	95.5	
Liberal hold		Swing	+2.0	

1982 Victorian state election: Ripon
Party	Candidate	Votes	%	±%
Liberal	Tom Austin	13,974	54.7	+7.8
Labor	Ian Bryant	11,553	45.3	+2.7
Total formal votes		25,527	98.1	−0.1
Informal votes		485	1.9	+0.1
Turnout		26,012	95.2	−0.2
Liberal hold		Swing	−0.5	

=== Elections in the 1970s ===
1979 Victorian state election: Ripon
Party	Candidate	Votes	%	±%
Liberal	Tom Austin	11,738	46.9	+8.7
Labor	Alex Pope	10,664	42.6	+4.2
National	Robert Peck	2,637	10.5	−10.0
Total formal votes		25,039	98.2	−0.3
Informal votes		446	1.8	+0.3
Two-party-preferred result
Liberal	Tom Austin	13,819	55.2	−4.7
Labor	Alex Pope	11,220	44.8	+4.7
Liberal hold		Swing	−4.7	

1976 Victorian state election: Ripon
Party	Candidate	Votes	%	±%
Labor	Alexander Pope	9,277	38.4	−9.0
Liberal	Tom Austin	9,216	38.2	+4.8
National	Rob Borbidge	4,941	20.5	+6.5
Democratic Labor	Francis O'Brien	713	2.9	−2.3
Total formal votes		24,147	98.5	
Informal votes		366	1.5	
Turnout		24,513	95.4	
Two-party-preferred result
Liberal	Tom Austin	14,473	59.9	+10.3
Labor	Alexander Pope	9,674	40.1	−10.3
Liberal gain from Labor		Swing	+10.3	

=== Elections in the 1950s ===
1952 Victorian state election: Ripon
Party	Candidate	Votes	%	±%
Labor	Ernie Morton	8,726	59.9	+10.9
Liberal and Country	Rutherford Guthrie	5,846	40.1	+0.6
Total formal votes		14,572	99.1	−0.5
Informal votes		133	0.9	+0.5
Turnout		14,705	95.5	−0.3
Labor hold		Swing	+8.4	

1950 Victorian state election: Ripon
Party	Candidate	Votes	%	±%
Labor	Ernie Morton	6,991	49.0	+2.9
Liberal and Country	Rutherford Guthrie	5,640	39.5	+9.7
Country	Allan Vanstan	1,642	11.5	−12.6
Total formal votes		14,273	99.6	+0.1
Informal votes		50	0.4	−0.1
Turnout		14,323	95.8	−0.5
Two-party-preferred result
Labor	Ernie Morton	7,351	51.5	+3.7
Liberal and Country	Rutherford Guthrie	6,922	48.5	−3.7
Labor gain from Liberal and Country		Swing	+3.7	

=== Elections in the 1940s ===
1947 Victorian state election: Ripon
Party	Candidate	Votes	%	±%
Labor	Ernie Morton	6,338	46.1	−5.5
Liberal	Rutherford Guthrie	4,103	29.8	+29.8
Country	Leonard Rodda	3,319	24.1	−24.3
Total formal votes		13,760	99.5	+0.1
Informal votes		73	0.5	−0.1
Turnout		13,833	96.3	+6.3
Two-party-preferred result
Liberal	Rutherford Guthrie	7,185	52.2	+52.2
Labor	Ernie Morton	6,575	47.8	−3.8
Liberal gain from Labor		Swing	N/A	

1945 Victorian state election: Ripon
Party	Candidate	Votes	%	±%
Labor	Ernie Morton	6,424	51.6	
Country	Alec McDonald	6,031	48.4	
Total formal votes		12,455	99.4	
Informal votes		69	0.6	
Turnout		12,524	90.0	
Labor gain from Country		Swing		
