= List of places of worship in Northern Grampians Shire =

This is a list of places of worship in the Shire of Northern Grampians, a local government area in the state of Victoria, Australia. The list includes active and former churches and other religious buildings representing a variety of Christian denominations and other faiths.

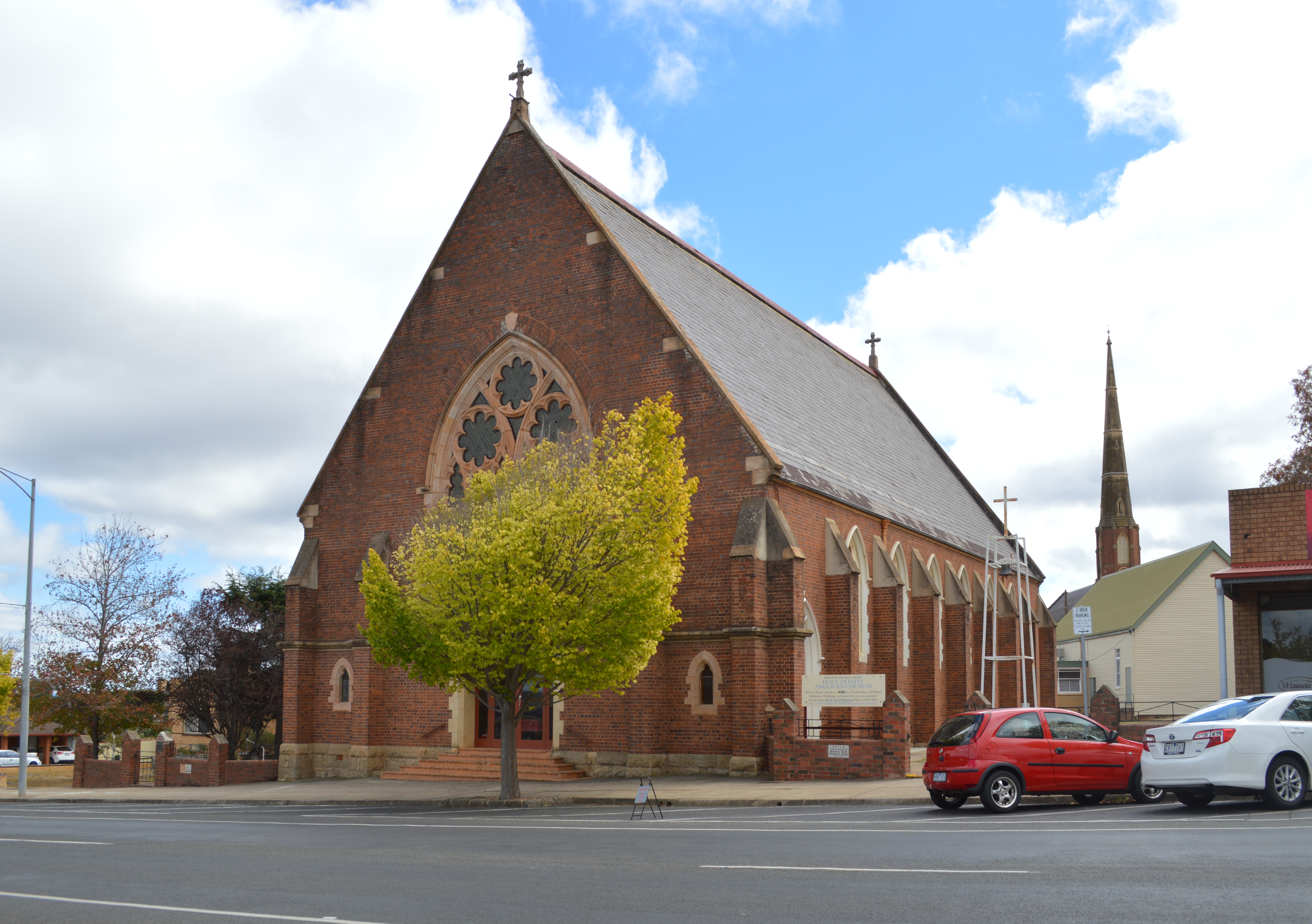
Holy Trinity Anglican Church, Stawell

== Heritage listing status ==
| Style | Status |
|---|---|
| Yes | Listed on the Victorian Heritage Register |
| – | Not listed |

== Current places of worship ==
Current places of worship
| Name | Image | Location | Denomination/ Affiliation | Heritage listing | Notes | Refs |
|---|---|---|---|---|---|---|
| St Arnaud Uniting Church | | St Arnaud; 36.617586°S 143.257802°E | Uniting (formerly Presbyterian) | Yes | | |
| St Arnaud Church of Christ | | St Arnaud; 36.614871°S 143.253840°E | Church of Christ | – | | |
| Christ Church Old Cathedral | | St Arnaud; 36.616273°S 143.255121°E | Anglican | Yes | Former cathedral | |
| Immaculate Conception Catholic Church | | St Arnaud; 36.615646°S 143.253382°E | Catholic | Yes | | |
| Stawell Seventh-day Adventist Church | | Stawell; 37.057481°S 142.778845°E | Seventh-day Adventist | – | | |
| Holy Trinity Anglican Church, Stawell | | Stawell; 37.056938°S 142.778415°E | Anglican | – | | |
| St Matthew's Uniting Church | | Stawell; 37.055981°S 142.778240°E | Uniting (formerly Presbyterian) | Yes | | |
| Stawell Church of Christ | | Stawell; 37.056609°S 142.781936°E | Church of Christ | – | | |
| St Peter's Lutheran Church | | Stawell; 37.055261°S 142.779612°E | Lutheran | – | | |
| St Patrick's Catholic Church, Stawell | | Stawell; 37.057321°S 142.785786°E | Catholic | – | | |
| St John's Anglican Church, Halls Gap | | Halls Gap; 37.134250°S 142.522205°E | Anglican | – | | |
| St Peter's Anglican Church (Pebble Church) | | Carapooee; 36.703837°S 143.310586°E | Anglican | Yes | | |
| Christ Church, Great Western | | Great Western; 37.149108°S 142.852304°E | Anglican | – | | |

== Former places of worship ==
Former places of worship
| Name | Image | Location | Denomination/ Affiliation | Heritage listing | Notes | Refs |
|---|---|---|---|---|---|---|
| St Patrick's Catholic Church, St Arnaud | | St Arnaud; 36.618387°S 143.257024°E | Catholic | – | | |
| Marnoo Uniting Church | | Marnoo; 36.670159°S 142.868807°E | Uniting | – | Relocated | |
| St Andrew's Presbyterian Church, Marnoo | | Marnoo; 36.669093°S 142.868610°E | Presbyterian | – | | |
| Stawell Baptist Church | | Stawell; 37.055728°S 142.778641°E | Baptist | – | | |
| Stawell Seventh-day Adventist Church (old) | | Stawell; 37.055016°S 142.772014°E | Seventh-day Adventist | – | | |
| Stawell United Methodist Church | | Stawell; 37.062071°S 142.776721°E | Methodist | – | | |
| Christ Church, Navarre | | Navarre; 36.899968°S 143.117475°E | Anglican | – | | |
| Navarre Uniting Church | | Navarre; 36.900692°S 143.112958°E | Uniting (formerly Presbyterian) | – | | |
| Great Western Uniting Church | | Great Western; 37.152548°S 142.852572°E | Uniting (formerly Methodist) | – | | |
| St Augustine's Catholic Church | | Great Western; 37.149930°S 142.851460°E | Catholic | – | | |
| Stuart Mill Uniting Church | | Stuart Mill; 36.809671°S 143.284473°E | Uniting (formerly Presbyterian) | – | | |
| St John's Catholic Church | | Stuart Mill; 36.808487°S 143.285358°E | Catholic | – | | |
| St James' Anglican Church | | Glenorchy; 36.906848°S 142.663524°E | Anglican | – | | |
| St Joseph's Catholic Church, Glenorchy | | Glenorchy; 36.908461°S 142.656615°E | Catholic | – | | |
| All Saints' Anglican Church, Emu | | Emu; 36.730578°S 143.445654°E | Anglican | Yes | | |
| St Bernard's Catholic Church | | Gooroc; 36.466604°S 143.198794°E | Catholic | Yes | | |
| Banyena Catholic Church | | Banyena; 36.573074°S 142.821863°E | Catholic | – | | |
| Glenorchy Uniting Church | | Glenorchy; 36.911475°S 142.662647°E | Uniting (formerly Presbyterian) | – | | |
| Paradise Uniting Church | | Paradise; 36.832105°S 143.110467°E | Uniting (formerly Presbyterian) | – | | |

== See also ==
- List of places of worship in Golden Plains Shire
- List of places of worship in Southern Grampians Shire
- List of places of worship in the City of Greater Geelong
