= Gowar East =

- Town
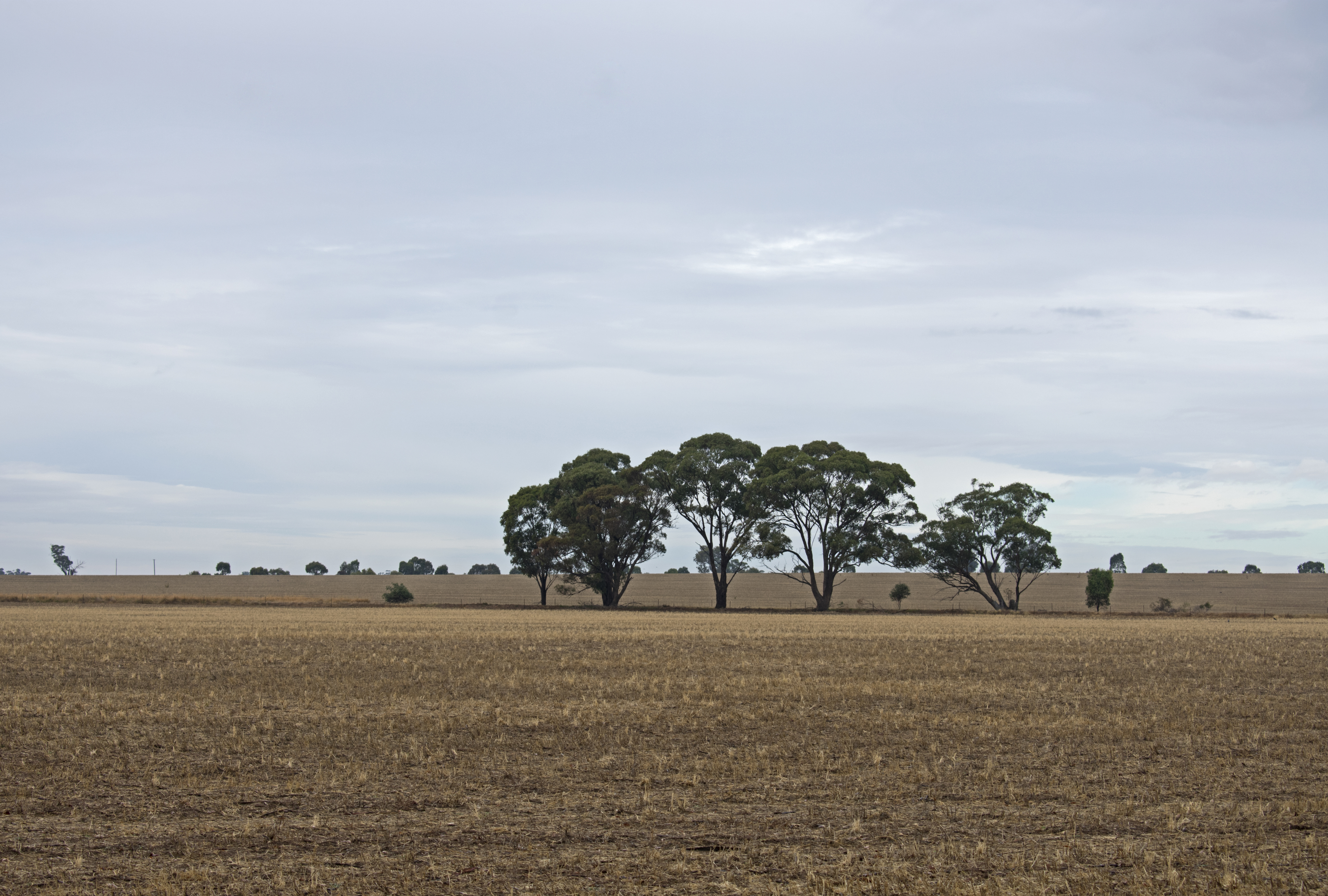
- Trees south of Wedderburn Road

- Coordinates: 36°33′43″S 143°23′15″E
- Country: Australia
- State: Victoria
- LGAs: Shire of Northern Grampians; Shire of Loddon

Government
  - State electorate: Ripon
  - Federal division: Mallee

Population
  - Total: 23 (2021 census)
- Postcode: 3477

Gowar East is a locality in the Shire of Loddon and Shire of Northern Grampians, Victoria, Australia. At the 2021 census, Gowar East had a population of 23.

== History ==
Gowar East is located on the lands of the Dja Dja Wurrung people.

During the 1890s, wheat and oats were the principal crops grown in the Gowar East district, with Algerian and potato oats favoured over the later-maturing Tartarian variety. In June 1890, the Berrimal branch of the Victorian Farmers' Progressive Association, based in the area, advocated for a railway line from Wedderburn to St Arnaud via Conooer Bridge. Harvests in the mid-1890s were poor, with low yields and grain quality, and farmers struggled to cover their expenses. Rabbits and foxes were also causing problems in the district, with foxes killing poultry and rabbits being targeted through poisoning and trapping.
