= Kooreh =

- Town
- Coordinates: 36°38′58″S 143°24′10″E
- Country: Australia
- State: Victoria
- LGA: Shire of Northern Grampians

Government
  - State electorate: Ripon
  - Federal division: Mallee

Population
  - Total: 29 (2021 census)
- Postcode: 3477

Kooreh is a locality in the Shire of Northern Grampians, Victoria, Australia. At the 2021 census, Kooreh had a population of 29.

== History ==
On 24 April 1915, the new Kooreh school was formally opened.
