= Traynors Lagoon =

- Town
- Coordinates: 36°35′0″S 142°58′56″E
- Country: Australia
- State: Victoria
- LGA: Shire of Northern Grampians

Government
  - State electorate: Ripon
  - Federal division: Mallee

Population
  - Total: 22 (2021 census)
- Postcode: 3477

Traynors Lagoon is a locality in the Shire of Northern Grampians, Victoria, Australia. At the 2021 census, Traynors Lagoon had a population of 22.
