= Callawadda =

Callawadda Victoria
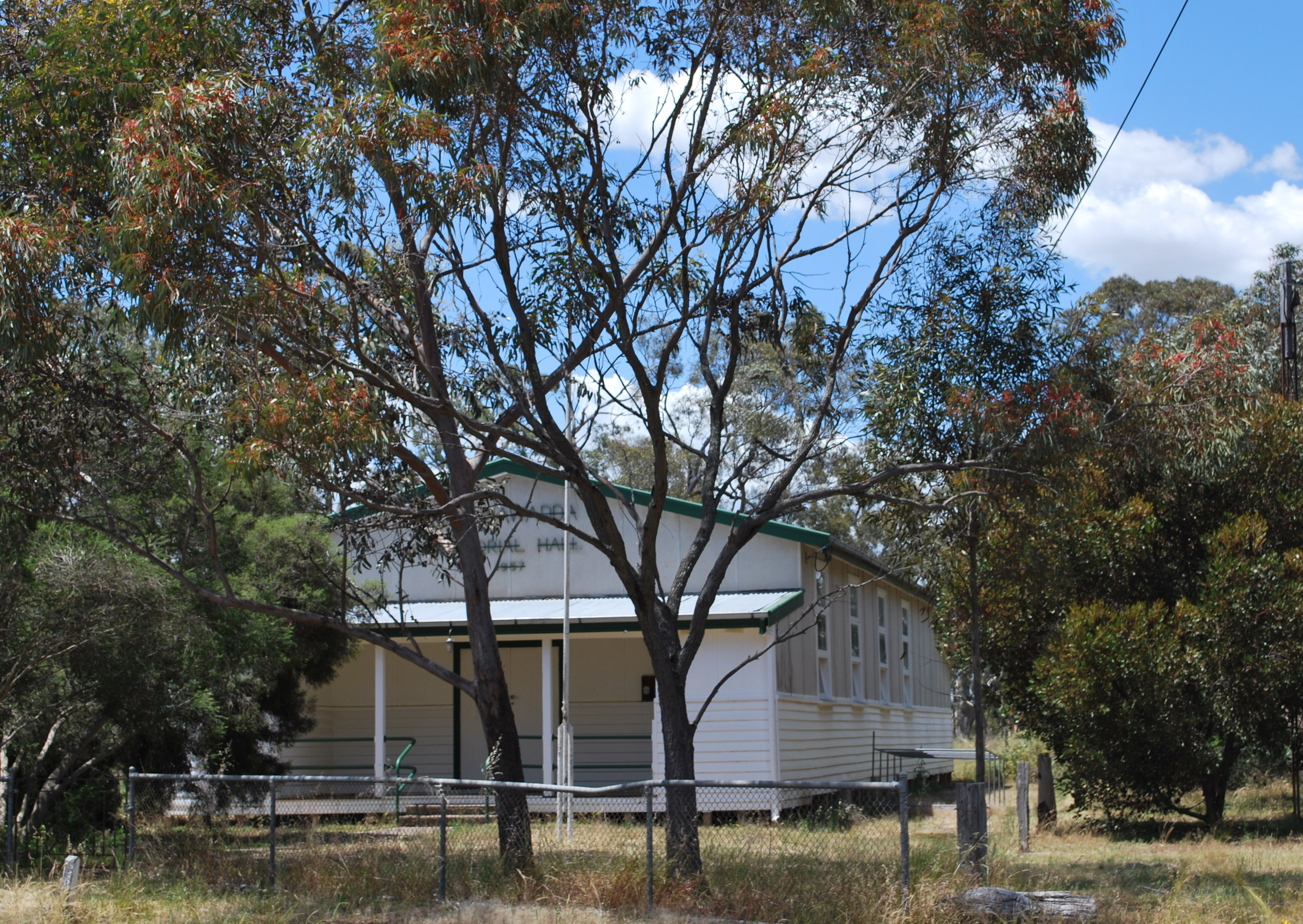
- Memorial hall at Callawadda, built in 1957

- Coordinates: 36°48′47″S 142°47′10″E
- Population: 43 (2016 census)
- Established: June 19, 1865
- Postcode(s): 3387
- Location: 262 km (163 mi) NW of Melbourne; 75 km (47 mi) E of Horsham; 23 km (14 mi) S of Marnoo
- LGA(s): Shire of Northern Grampians
- State electorate(s): Ripon
- Federal division(s): Mallee

Callawadda is a locality in the Wimmera region of western Victoria, Australia. The locality is in the Shire of Northern Grampians, 262 kilometres (163 mi) west of the state capital, Melbourne.

At the 2016 census, Callawadda had a population of 43.
