= St Arnaud East =

- Town
- Coordinates: 36°37′33″S 143°19′31″E
- Country: Australia
- State: Victoria
- LGA: Shire of Northern Grampians

Government
  - State electorate: Ripon
  - Federal division: Mallee

Population
  - Total: 100 (2021 census)
- Postcode: 3477

St Arnaud East is a locality in the Shire of Northern Grampians, Victoria, Australia. At the 2021 census, St Arnaud East had a population of 100.
