= Rich Avon West =

- Town
- Coordinates: 36°30′17″S 142°48′53″E
- Country: Australia
- State: Victoria
- LGA: Shire of Northern Grampians

Government
  - State electorates: Ripon; Lowan
  - Federal division: Mallee

Population
  - Total: 34 (2021 census)
- Postcode: 3480

Rich Avon West is a locality in the Shire of Northern Grampians, Victoria, Australia. At the 2021 census, Rich Avon West had a population of 34.
