= Joel Joel =

Joel Joel Victoria
- Coordinates: 37°00′S 143°00′E
- Population: 17 (SAL 2021)
- Postcode(s): 3381
- Location: 229 km (142 mi) WNW of Melbourne; 116 km (72 mi) NW of Ballarat; 42 km (26 mi) N of Ararat; 23 km (14 mi) E of Stawell
- LGA(s): Shire of Northern Grampians
- State electorate(s): Ripon
- Federal division(s): Wannon

Joel Joel is a locality in the Shire of Northern Grampians, 23 km east of Stawell in the Wimmera region of Victoria, Australia.

== History ==
=== Before European settlement ===
The traditional owners of the area are the Dja Dja Wurrung or Jaara people who are part of the larger Kulin nation.

=== Early years ===
Joel Joel Post Office opened on 19 August 1892, closed in 1895, reopened in 1902 and closed again in 1965.

=== Modern period ===
In 1914 a railway line was established to connect Joel Joel and other nearby towns to the main line to the south which ran between Ararat and Avoca.

== Facilities and Attractions ==
A new CFA Fire Station was opened on 18 March 2011 by Parliamentary Secretary Bill Tilley MP.
