= Sutherland, Victoria =

Sutherland
- Town
- Coordinates: 36°32′2″S 143°11′53″E
- Country: Australia
- State: Victoria
- LGA: Shire of Northern Grampians

Government
  - State electorate: Ripon
  - Federal division: Mallee

Population
  - Total: 16 (2021 census)
- Postcode: 3477

Sutherland is a locality in the Shire of Northern Grampians, Victoria, Australia. At the 2021 census, Sutherland had a population of 16.
