= Navarre, Victoria =

Navarre Victoria
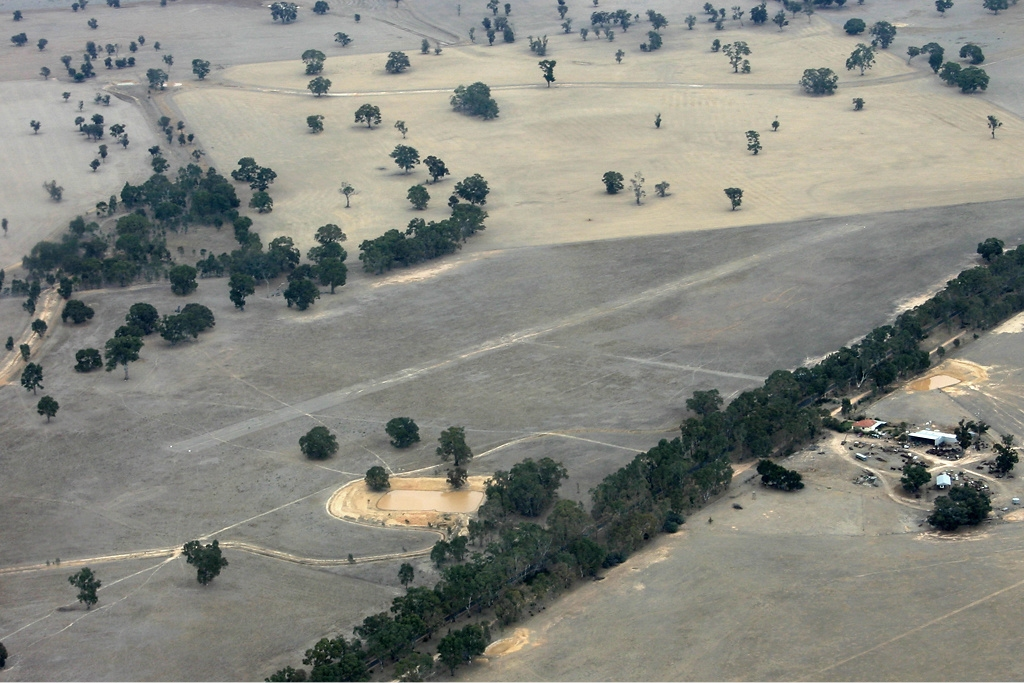
- Navarre Airfield

- Coordinates: 36°54′0″S 143°06′48″E
- Population: 99 (2021 census)
- Established: 1861
- Postcode(s): 3384
- Location: 227 km (141 mi) NW of Melbourne; 114 km (71 mi) NW of Ballarat; 37 km (23 mi) NE of Stawell; 38 km (24 mi) S of St Arnaud
- LGA(s): Shire of Northern Grampians; Shire of Pyrenees
- State electorate(s): Ripon
- Federal division(s): Mallee

Navarre is a town in the Wimmera region of the Australian state of Victoria. The town is in the Shire of Northern Grampians and Shire of Pyrenees local government areas, 227 kilometres (141 mi) north west of the state capital, Melbourne and 37 kilometres (23 mi) north east of the regional centre of Stawell. At the 2021 census, Navarre and the surrounding area had a population of 99.

Navarre began as the site of an inn established in 1848 alongside a stock route. This was joined by a second inn in 1850. The discovery of gold at Mount Alexander in 1851 saw the inns become a popular stopping point for miners on their way to the diggings. The town was surveyed in 1855 and renamed after the medieval European Kingdom of Navarre. Navarre Post Office opened on 2 February 1856. The town was officially proclaimed in 1861 and in 1868 was host to a store, post office and school.

In May 1914 a railway station, weighbridge and repair area were constructed to service the newly opened Navarre - Crowlands Railway. For forty years it carried passengers, cargo, livestock and timber to the connecting stations to its south. In 1954 the line was closed and the station and service facilities quickly fell into ruin; little remains today to the casual observer. In aerial photographs parch marks are clearly visible across the nearby countryside and indicate the original route of the line.

Navarre today is a farming community, surrounded by prime agricultural land. The town is serviced by a co-operative general store, public hall and primary school.

Navarre Football Club play in the Maryborough Castlemaine District Football League.
