= Emu, Victoria =

Emu
- Town
- Coordinates: 36°44′9″S 143°26′40″E
- Country: Australia
- State: Victoria
- LGAs: Shire of Northern Grampians; Shire of Loddon

Government
  - State electorate: Ripon
  - Federal division: Mallee

Population
  - Total: 37 (2021 census)
- Postcode: 3475

Emu is a locality in the Shire of Loddon and the Shire of Northern Grampians, Victoria, Australia. At the 2021 census, Emu had a population of 37.
