= Stuart Mill, Victoria =

Stuart Mill Victoria
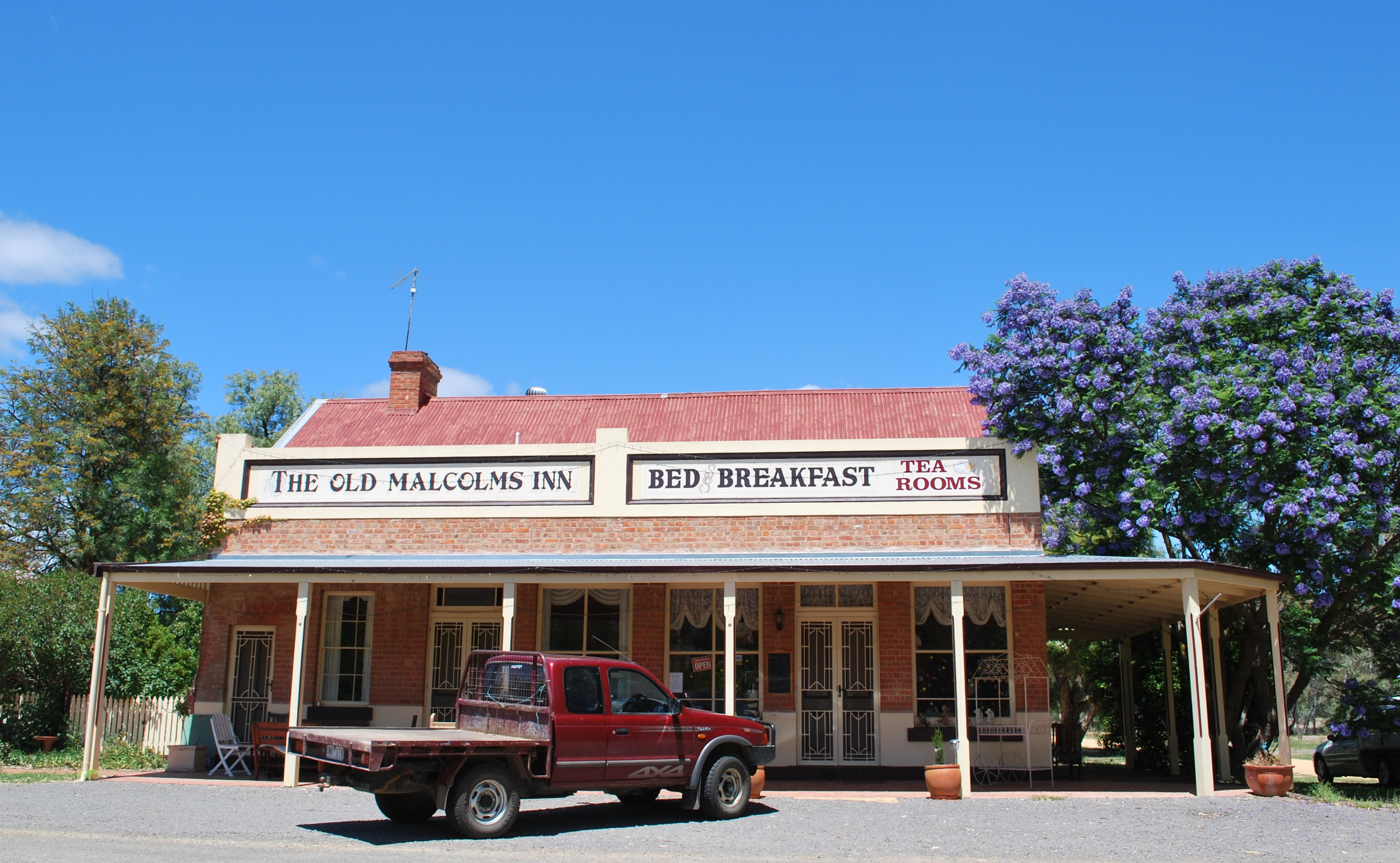
- The Old Malcolms Inn, now a Bed and breakfast

- Coordinates: 36°47′0″S 143°12′0″E
- Population: 78 (2021 census)
- Postcode(s): 3478
- Location: 223 km (139 mi) NW of Melbourne; 110 km (68 mi) NW of Bendigo; 23 km (14 mi) S of St Arnaud, Victoria
- LGA(s): Shire of Northern Grampians
- State electorate(s): Ripon
- Federal division(s): Mallee

Stuart Mill is a town in north western Victoria, Australia. It is located in the Shire of Northern Grampians and on the Sunraysia Highway, 232 kilometres (144 mi) north west of the state capital of Melbourne. At the 2021 census, Stuart Mill had a population of 78.

The town is named after the British philosopher John Stuart Mill.
