= Zumsteins =

Zumsteins Victoria
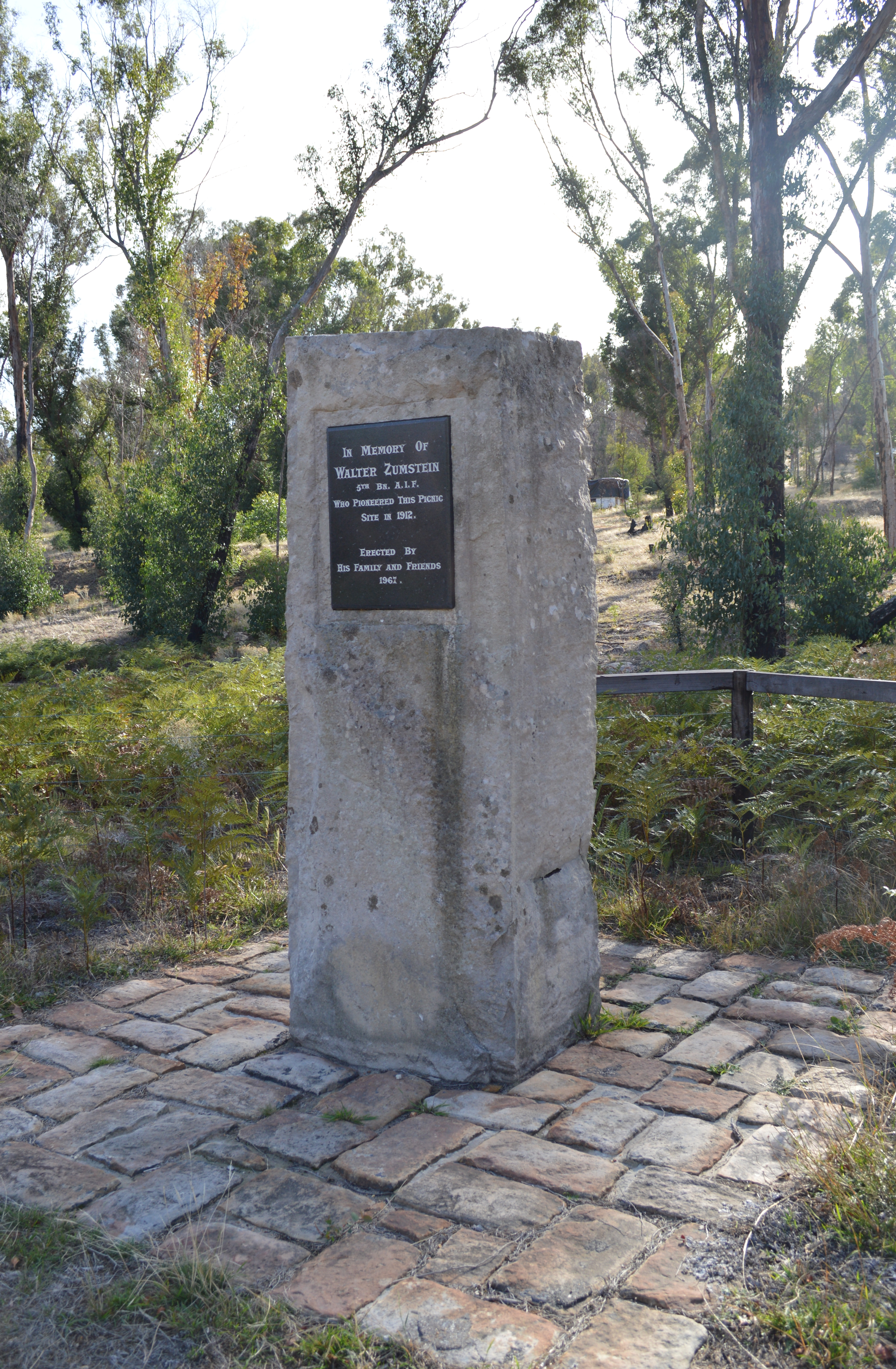
- The Walter Zumstein Memorial

- Coordinates: 37°05′34″S 142°23′07″E
- Population: 0 (2021 census)
- Postcode(s): 3401
- Location: 274 km (170 mi) NW of Melbourne; 52 km (32 mi) E of Horsham; 23 km (14 mi) NW of Halls Gap
- LGA(s): Shire of Northern Grampians
- State electorate(s): Lowan
- Federal division(s): Mallee

Zumsteins is a locality in western Victoria, Australia. The locality is in the Shire of Northern Grampians, 262 kilometres (163 mi) west of the state capital, Melbourne—entirely inside the Grampians National Park.

At the 2021 census, there were no permanent residents at Zumsteins.

== History ==
Zumsteins was one of Australia's first holiday retreats. Walter Zumstein first visited this site in 1906 while working as a young beekeeper for Barnes Honey. In 1910, he established his own apiary, with 60 hives and a small timber cottage. He saw active service in World War I, and when he returned to Australia with his Scottish wife Jean, he decided to supplement their modest income by establishing a small 'tourist retreat'.

During the 1930s the couple built three pisé, or rammed earth cottages, plus a tennis court and a large swimming pool. Water for the pool was taken from the nearby MacKenzie River. Soil excavated to create the swimming pool was used to build the cottages. The cottages are recognised on the Victorian Heritage Register as some of the very few pisé buildings using local materials from the early 20th century.

The couple remained at Zumsteins until the late 1950s, when they moved to Horsham. Walter and his wife were perceived as a gentle couple who, through hard work, had created an oasis that they loved and wanted others to enjoy too. Walter Zumstein died in October 1963. His ashes were scattered at Zumsteins.

In the 1960s, the campground was extended upstream, with a toilet block and a kiosk near the river. At its peak, up to 200 tents and caravans squeezed in, sometimes only a metre or so from the road. Then, with the declaration of the Grampians National Park in 1984, a new focus on the area's natural and cultural values led to growing concern about pollution to the river, and the eventual closure of the campground in 1994.

== Gallery ==
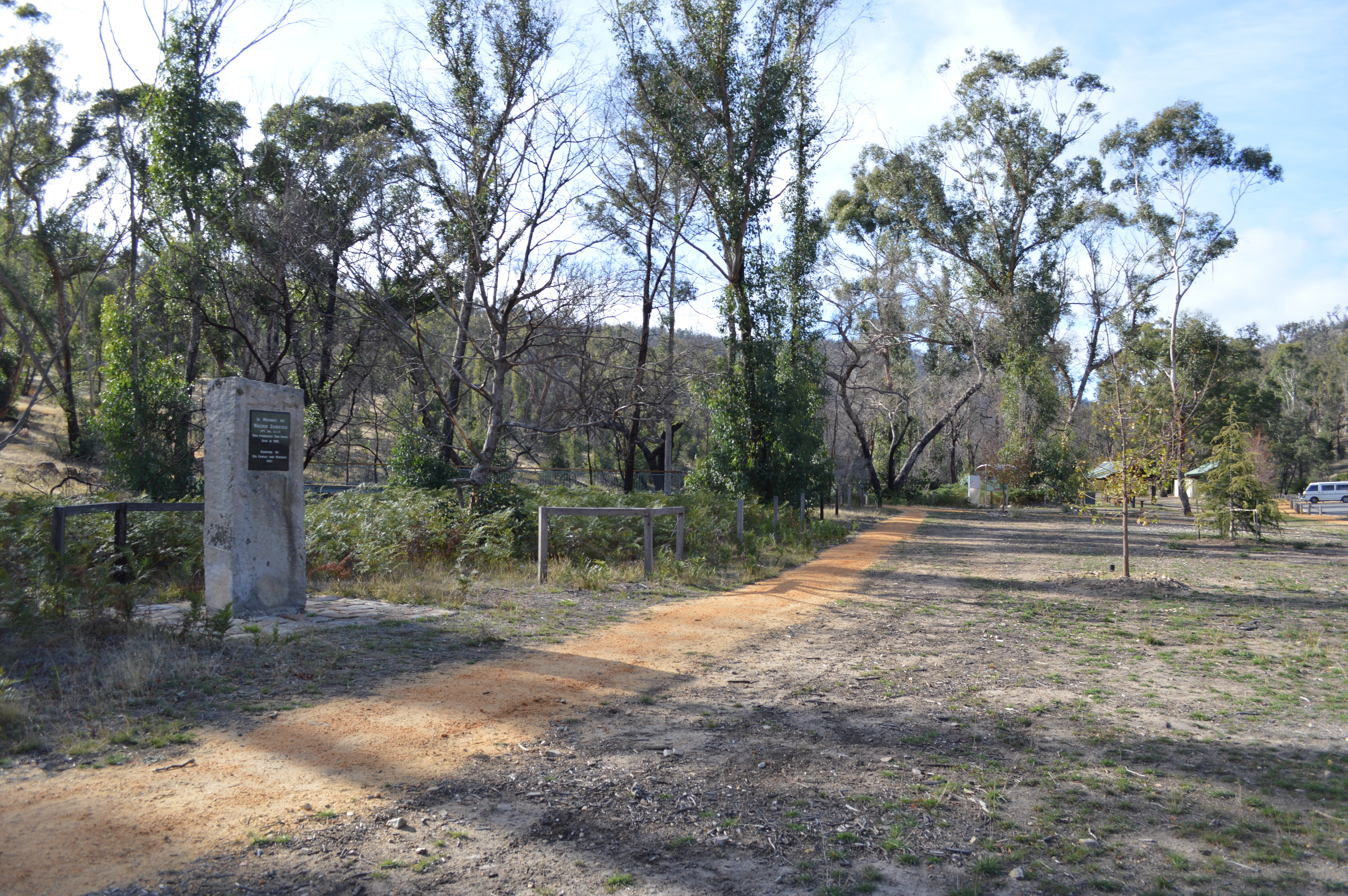
Zumsteins picnic area

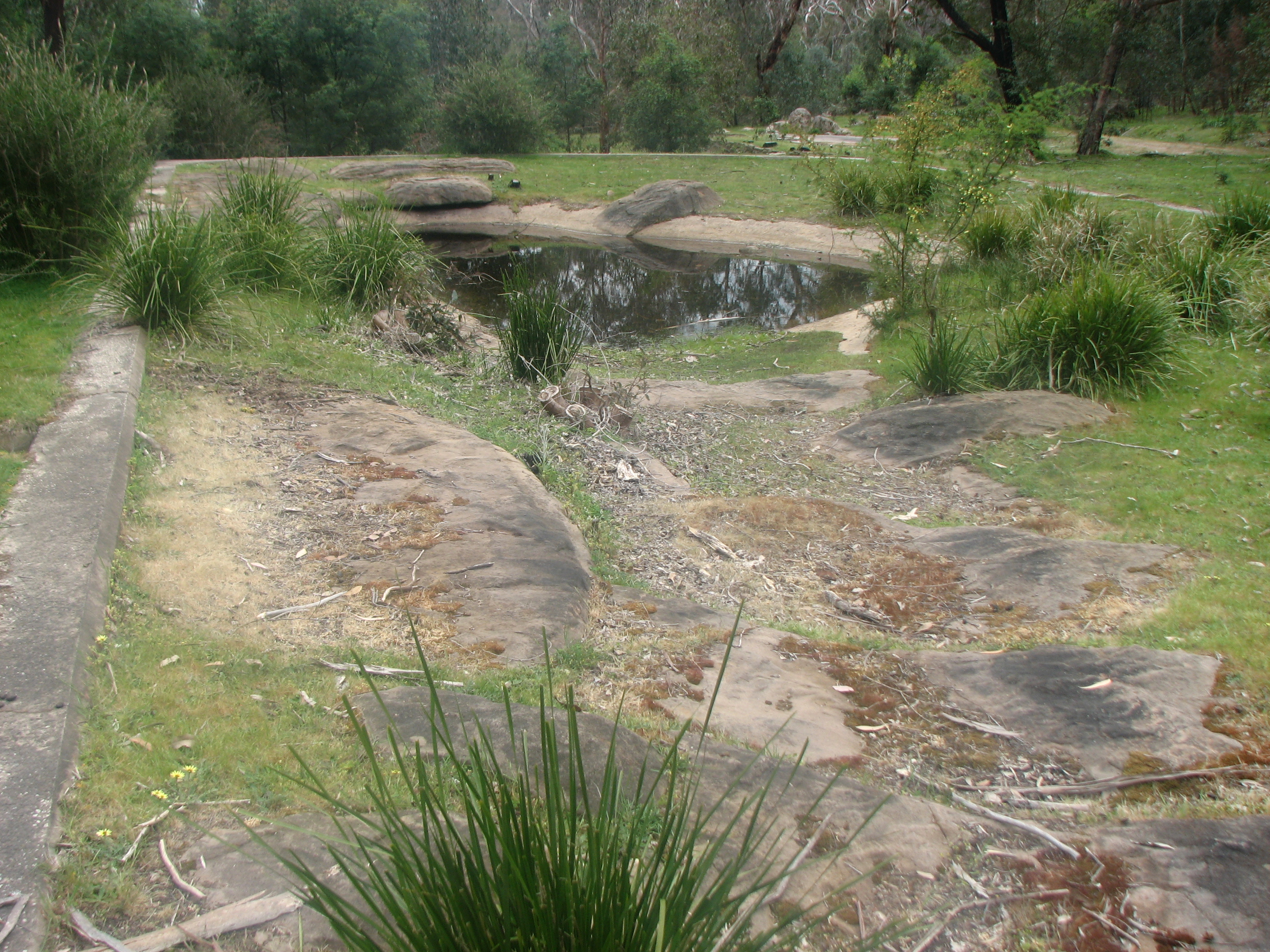
The pool constructed by the Zumsteins for use by visitors to the holiday park

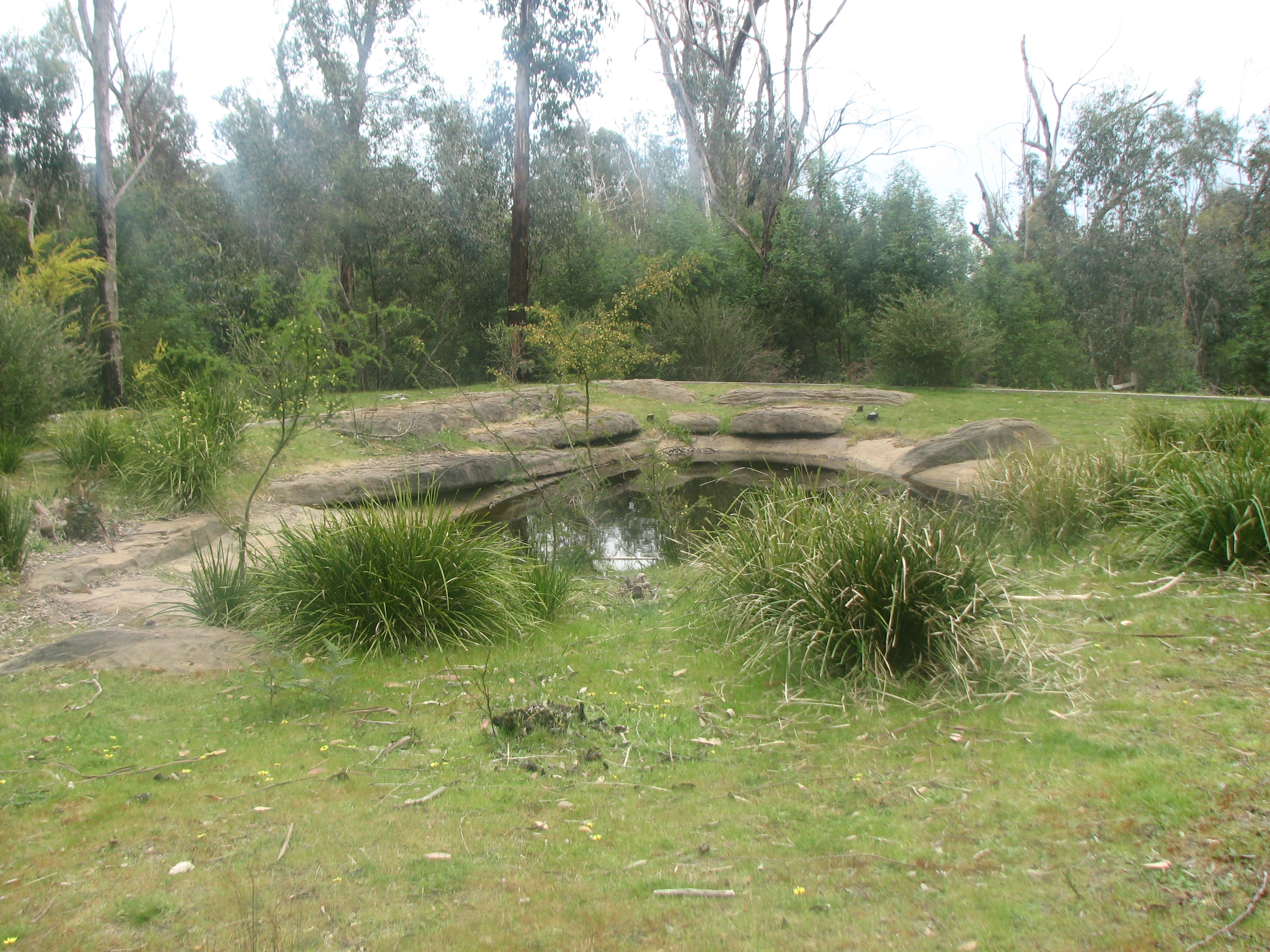
The pool constructed by the Zumsteins for use by visitors to the holiday park

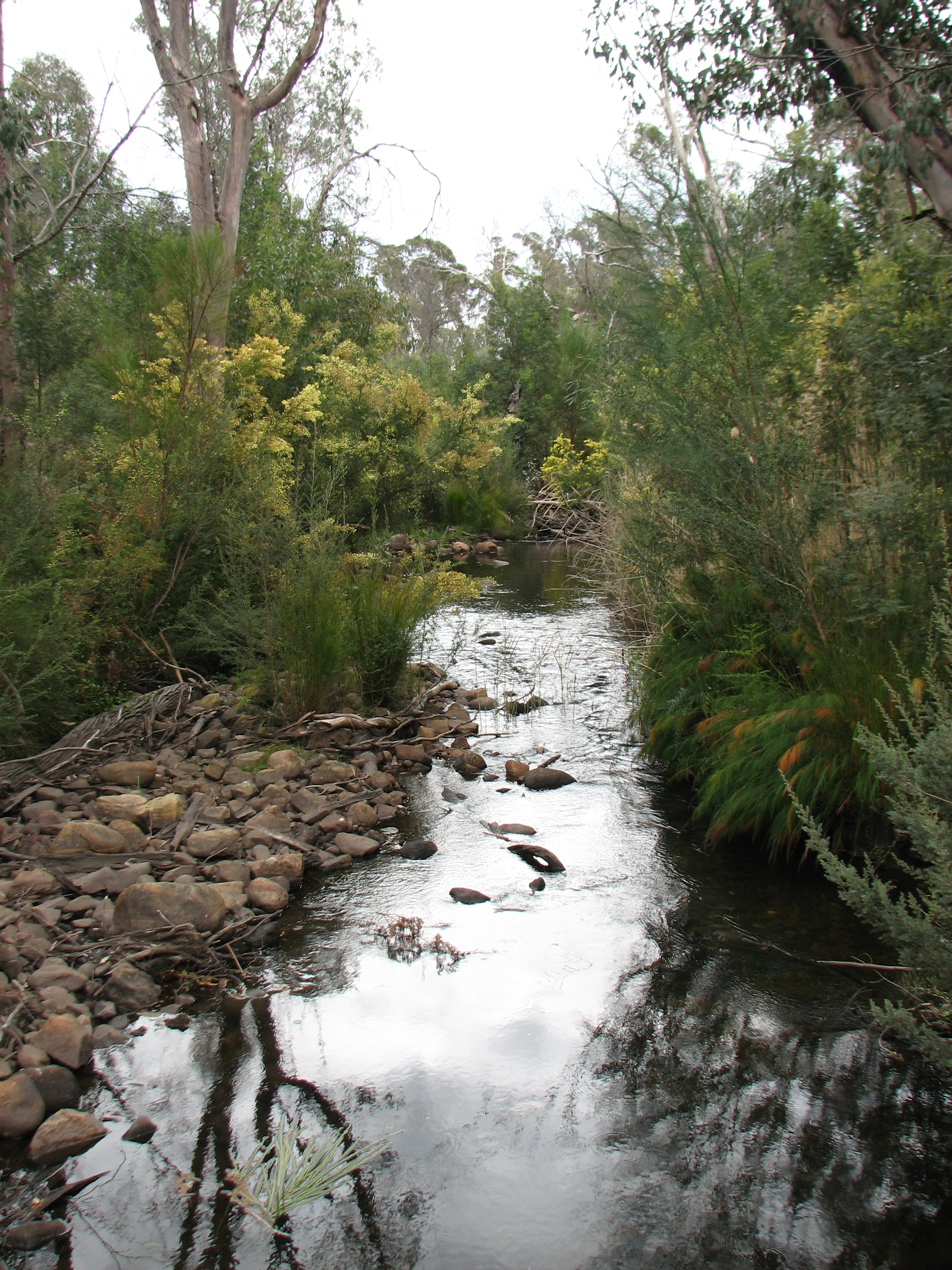
The MacKenzie River running through Zumsteins picnic area was used to fill the pool in the holiday park.
