= Louise Staley =

Australian politician

Louise Staley MP

Member of the Victorian Legislative Assembly for Ripon
- In office 29 November 2014 – 26 November 2022
- Preceded by: Joe Helper
- Succeeded by: Martha Haylett

Personal details
- Born: 9 August 1965 (age 61)
- Party: Liberal Party
- Education: University of Melbourne
- Occupation: Grain grower
- Website: http://louisestaley.com.au

Louise Eileen Staley (born 9 August 1965) is an Australian politician. She was elected as Liberal Party member of the Victorian Legislative Assembly in November 2014, representing the Legislative Assembly seat of Ripon until her defeat in 2022.

Staley variously served as the Shadow Treasurer, Shadow Minister for Roads and Shadow Minister for Transport Infrastructure.

== Early life ==
Staley attended Korowa Anglican Girls School, graduating in 1982. She then attended Melbourne University, where she completed her Bachelor of Arts. While at university, Staley was involved in student politics.

Staley completed a Post Graduate Diploma in Applied Finance from the Securities Institute, a Post Graduate Diploma in Finance from Melbourne University, a Chartered Financial Analyst accreditation through the CFA Institute USA and a Masters in Public Policy at Flinders University.

== Early career ==
Following a career in finance, Staley joined her partner Stephen at Willaura, where they farmed cereals and canola. In 2007, Staley called for reform to the wheat industry’s single desk system.

Staley has held several positions, including serving as President of the East Grampians Health Service.

Staley was also a director of the Grampians Medicare Local, a director of Networking Health Victoria, and a Director of the Food and Environment Unit at the Institute of Public Affairs.

Staley was convicted of drink driving in 2000, having a blood alcohol content of twice the legal limit. She was subsequently accused of covering up the crime from the Liberal Party when seeking pre-selection for the seat of Menzies, an accusation she denied.

== Political career ==
Louise Staley became a member of the Liberal Party in 1985 and has held various positions within the party since, including as State Vice President from 1996 until 2000.

Staley was elected as the Liberal Party member for Ripon in November 2014. She was re-elected in the November 2018 election by just 15 votes, the closest result of that election.

Staley was defeated at the 2022 Victorian state election after eight years in Opposition.

In June 2023, The Australian Financial Review reported that Staley had been engaged to revive the H. R. Nicholls Society, a right-wing think tank, to "support growing business opposition to Labor's upcoming laws to regulate gig workers, labour hire and casual employment".

In 2023 Staley ran for the positions of State director of the Victorian Liberal Party, and to fill a casual vacancy in the Legislative Council caused by the resignation of Matthew Bach, but was unsuccessful in both attempts.

Victorian Legislative Assembly
Preceded by Joe Helper	Member for Ripon; 2014–2022	Succeeded by Martha Haylett
