= Great Western, Victoria =

Great Western
- Town
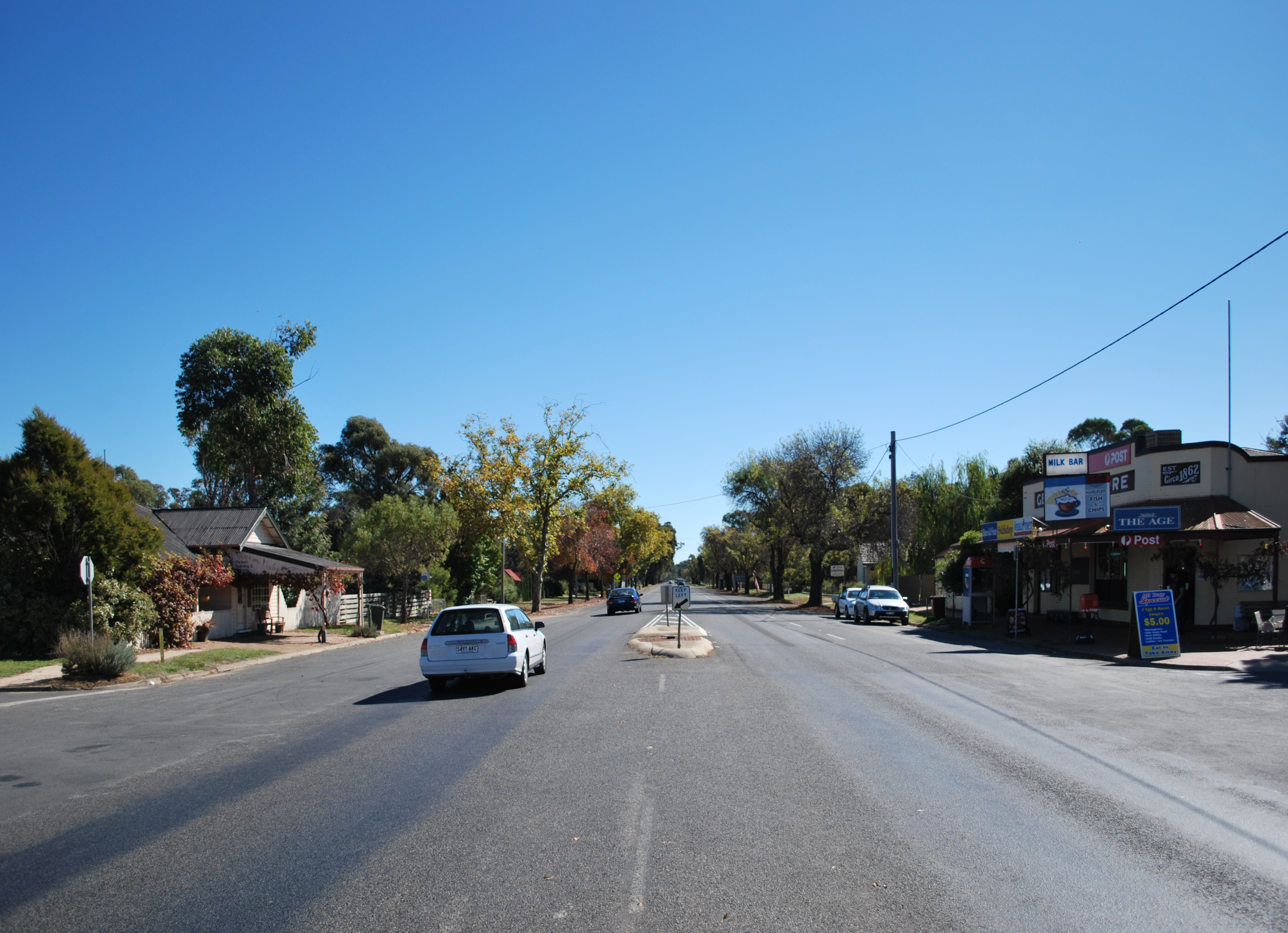
- The Western Highway at Great Western

- Coordinates: 37°09′0″S 142°51′0″E
- Country: Australia
- State: Victoria
- LGA: Shire of Northern Grampians
- Location: 225 km (140 mi) north west of Melbourne; 111 km (69 mi) north west of Ballarat; 19 km (12 mi) north of Ararat; 16 km (9.9 mi) south east of Stawell

Government
  - State electorate: Ripon
  - Federal division: Wannon

Population
  - Total: 425 (2021 census)
- Postcode: 3377

Great Western is a town in the east of the Wimmera region of Victoria, Australia. The town is located on the Western Highway, in the Shire of Northern Grampians local government area, 225 kilometres north west of the state capital, Melbourne. The town has a population of 425.

The first European settlers in the Great Western area were sheep graziers in the 1840s and closer settlement began with the discovery of gold during the Victorian gold rush, the Post Office opening on 1 June 1858. . The first vineyards in the Great Western area were established by two Frenchmen who met at the gold diggings at Daylesford. Following their example, Joseph Best and his brother Henry established vineyards in 1865. Following Joseph's death in 1888, the property was purchased by Hans Irvine. Irvine imported staff from France and dedicated himself to establishing a sparkling wine of comparable quality to French champagne. In 1918, Irvine sold the winery to his friend and Australian wine pioneer, Benno Seppelt. For decades Seppelt's "Great Western" and Penfolds' "Minchinbury" were strong contenders for Australia's premier Champagne-style sparkling wine.

Today, Great Western is the wine and food village of the Grampians. Wineries are still producing quality sparkling wines including Seppelt Salinger at the Seppelt winery, now owned by Treasury Wine Estates. The Ahchow Family have been custodians of the Seppelt Great Western estate since 2016. The Seppelt cellars include over 3 kilometres of labyrinthine tunnels ("drives") originally constructed by out of work gold miners. The underground cellars were used to allow the sparkling wine to rest and develop. Sparkling Shiraz was first made at the now Seppelt site in Great Western. The other major vineyard in the area is the Concongella vineyard, operated by Best's Wines, producing a wide variety of wine types. Table shiraz, including some from pre-phylloxera root stocks, is also produced by wineries in the area. The development of a water recycling program transferring waste water from nearby Ararat to wineries at Great Western has allowed recent expansion of the wine industry in the area.

The horse racing club, the Wimmera Racing Club, holds the Great Western Cup meeting on Australia Day (26 January), and a rodeo is also held annually.

The town has an Australian Rules football team competing in the Mininera & District Football League.

== Gallery ==
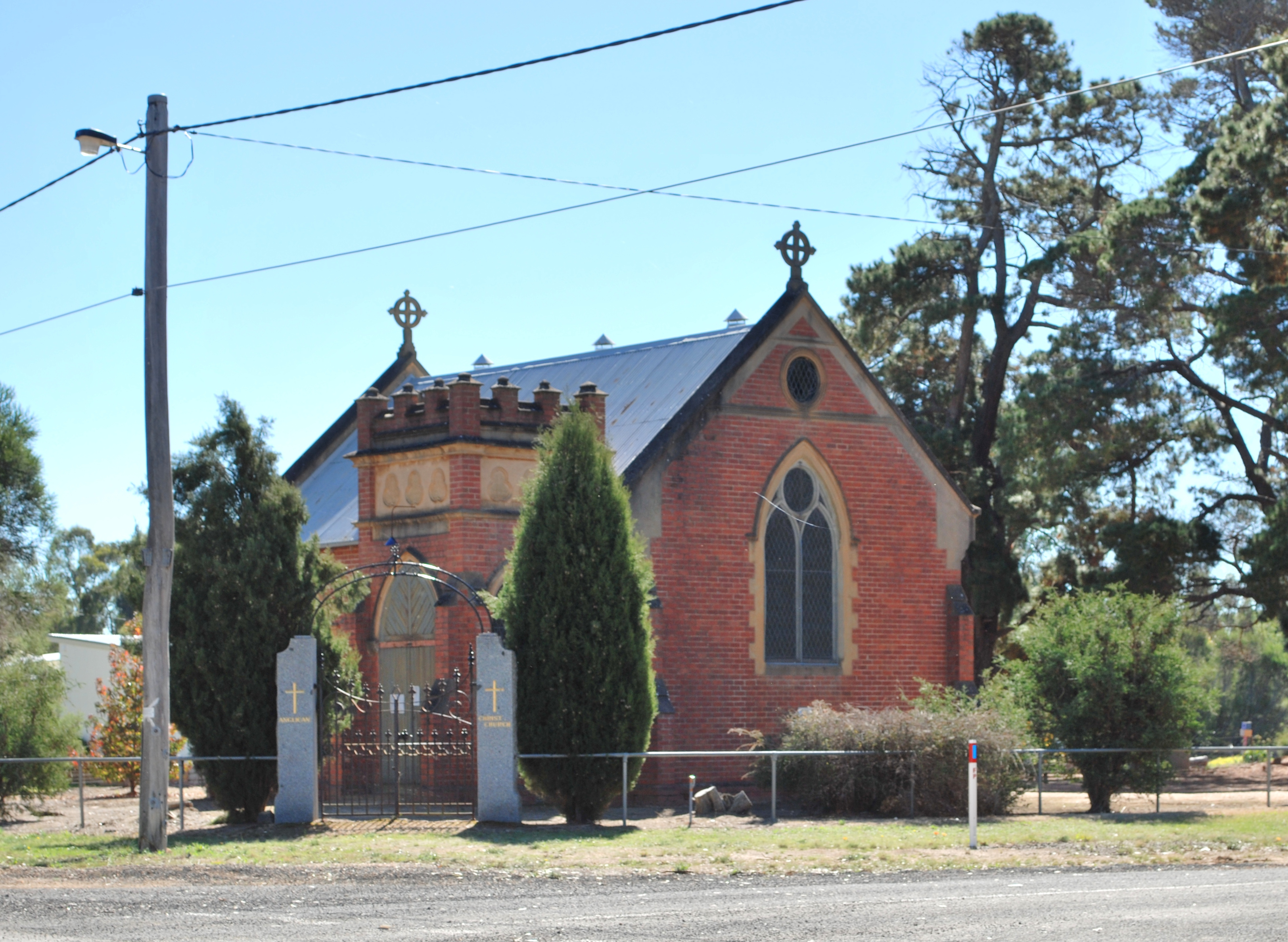
Anglican Church

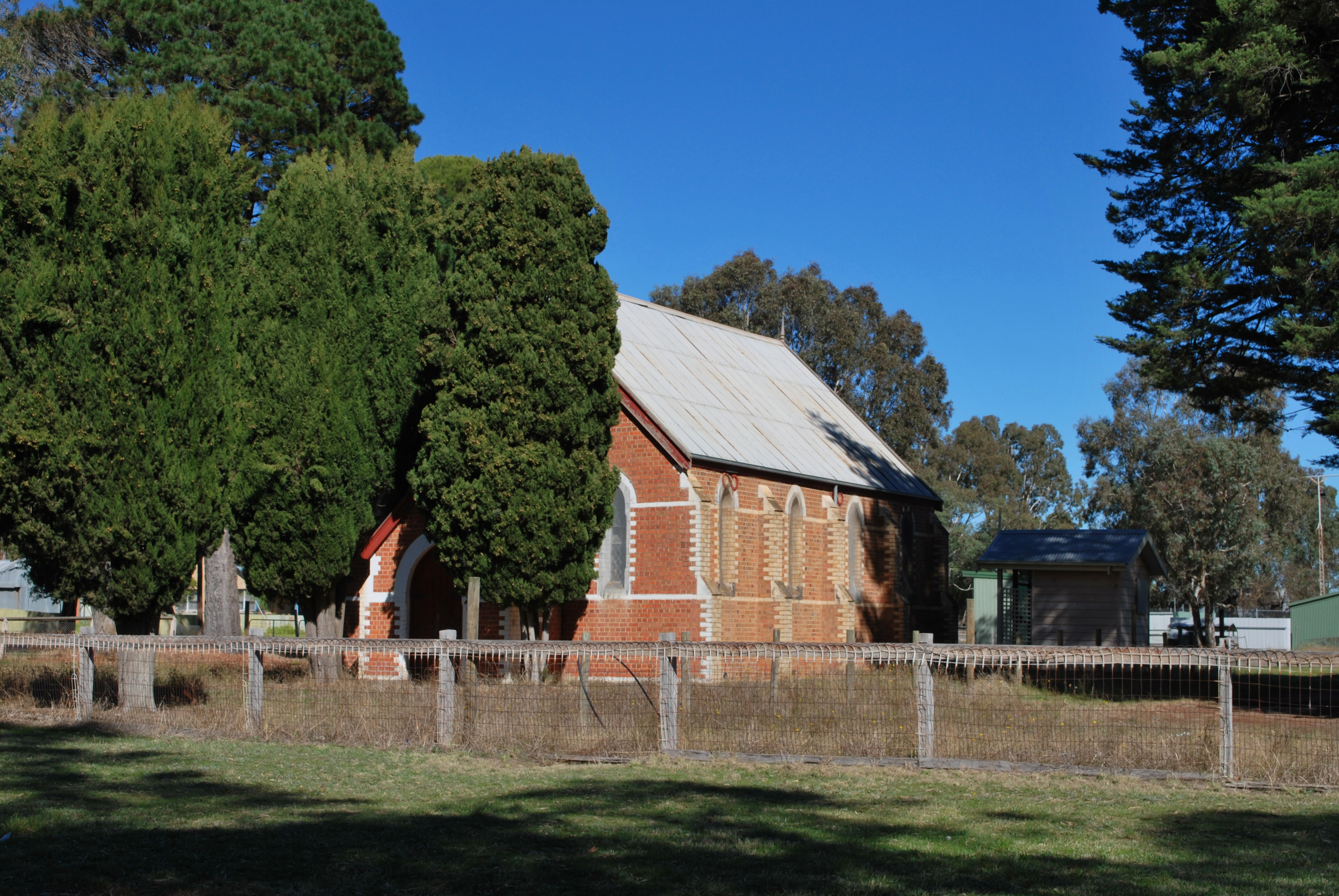
Church building

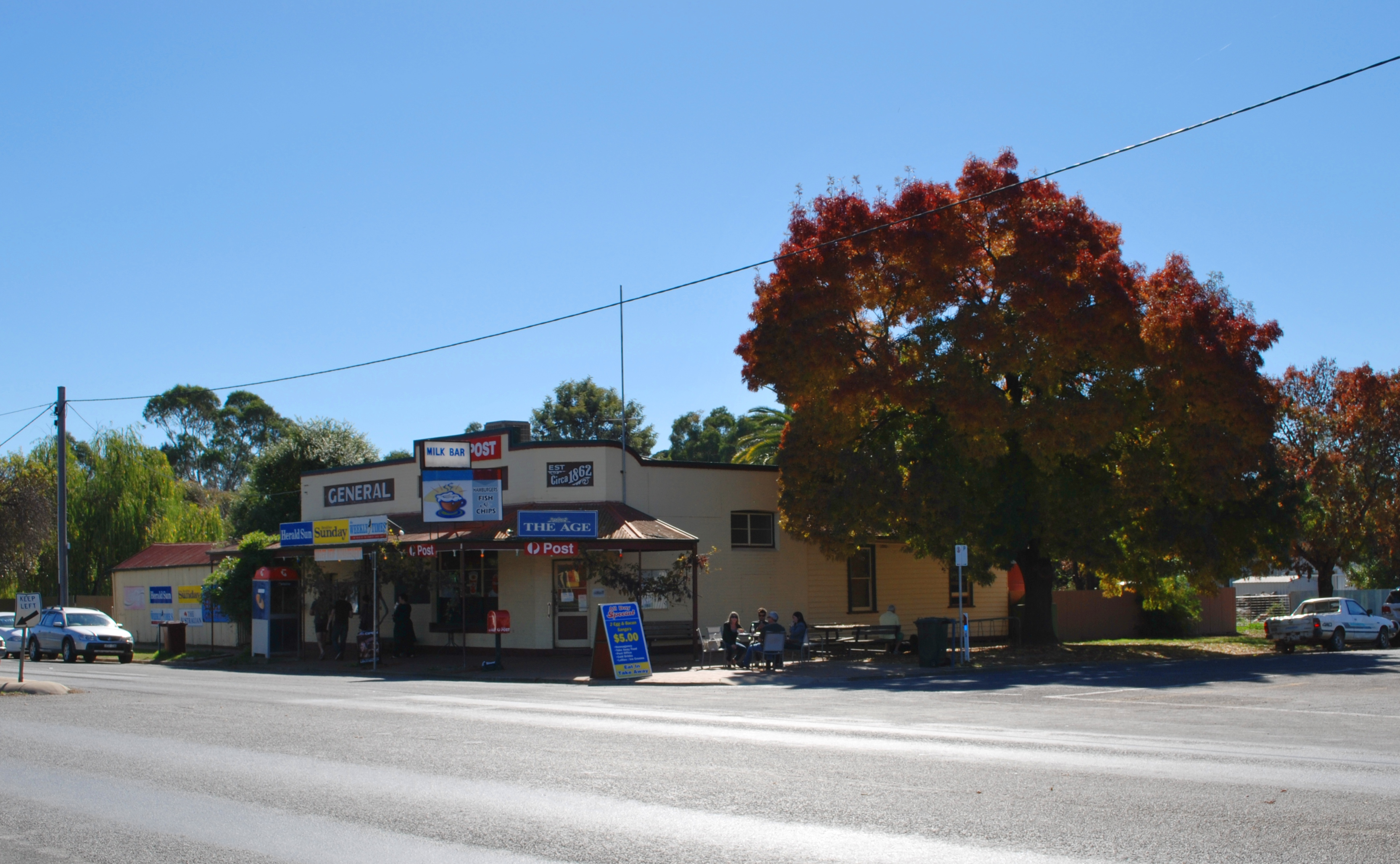
General Store

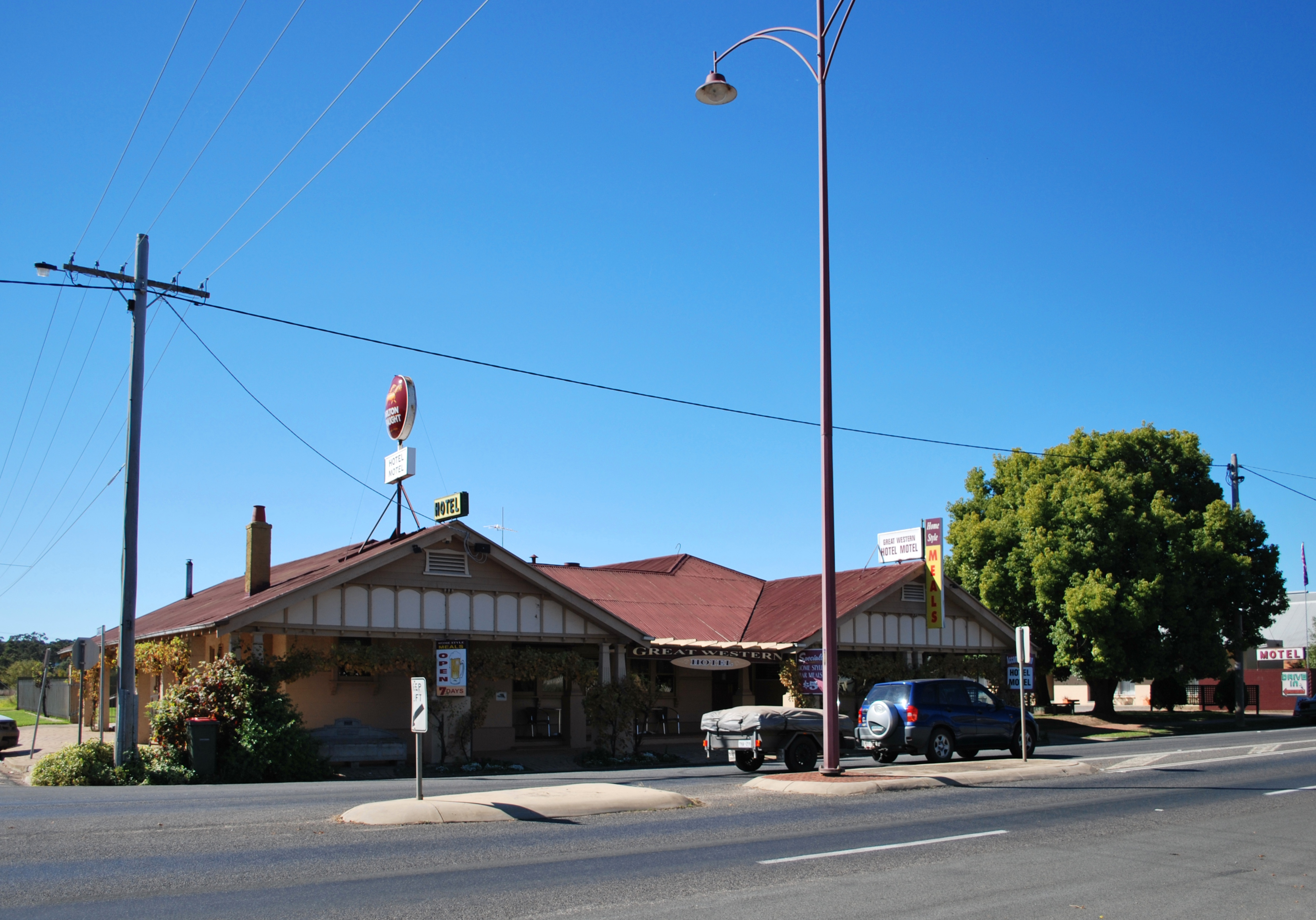
Great Western Hotel

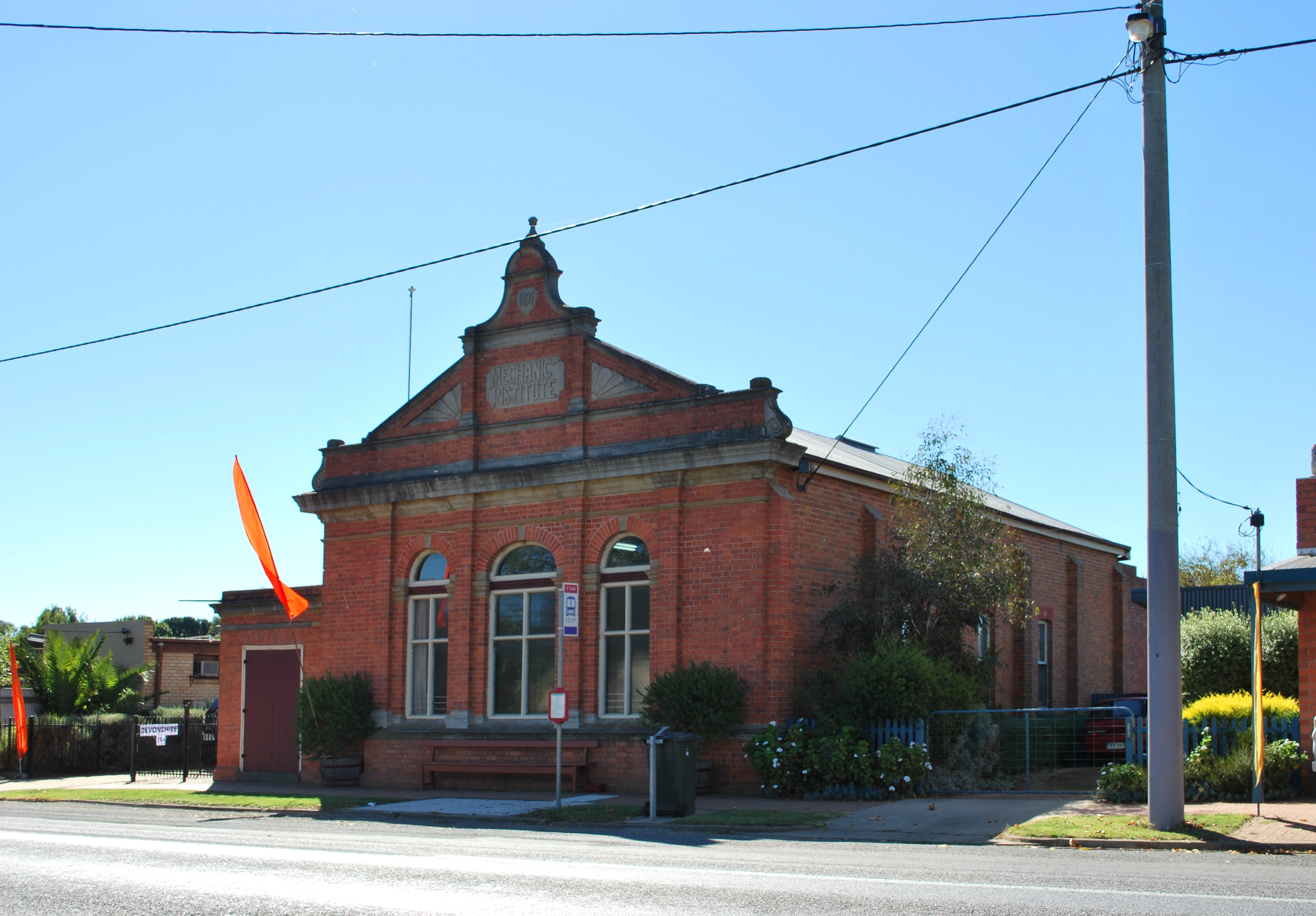
Mechanics Institute

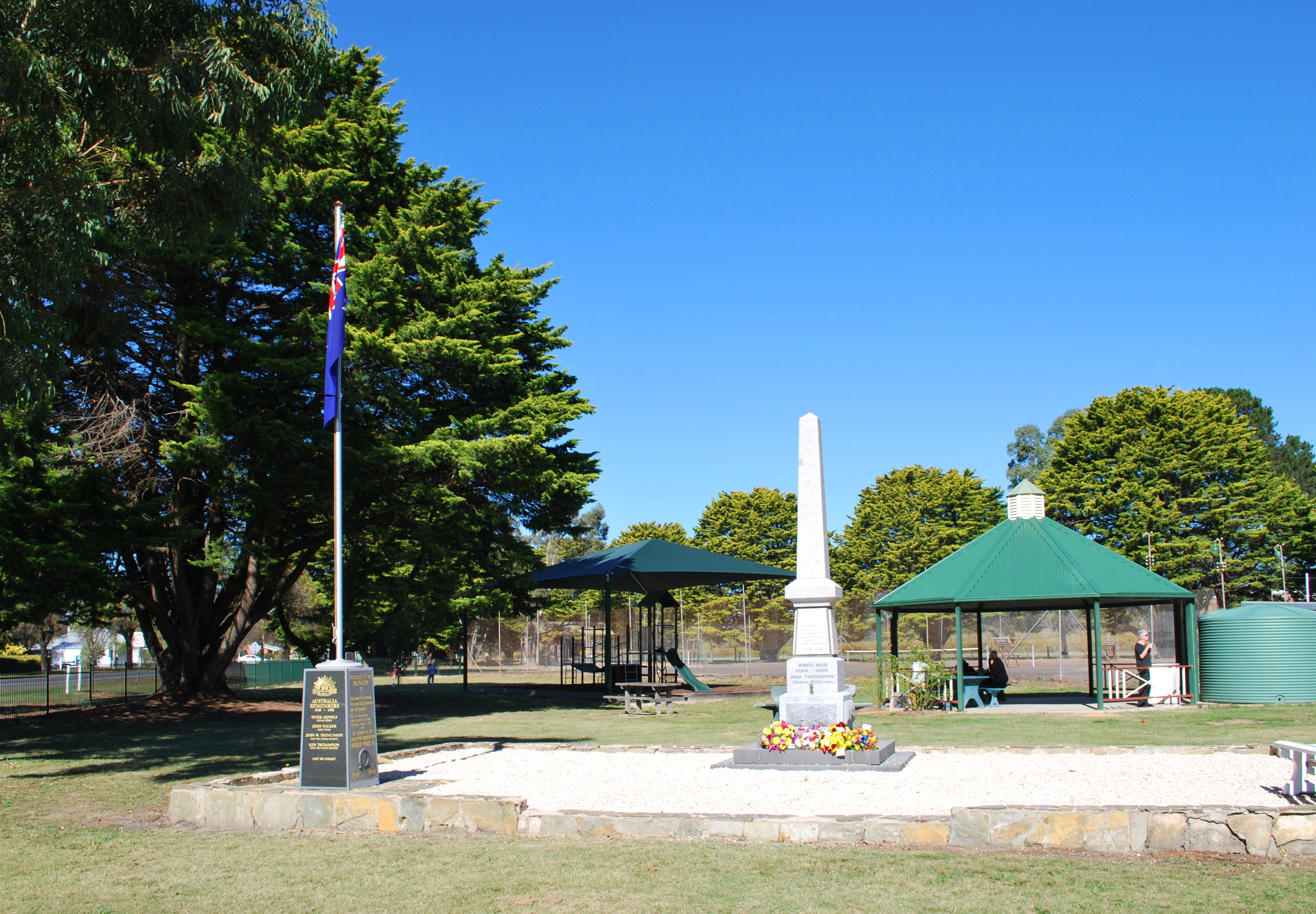
War memorial gates

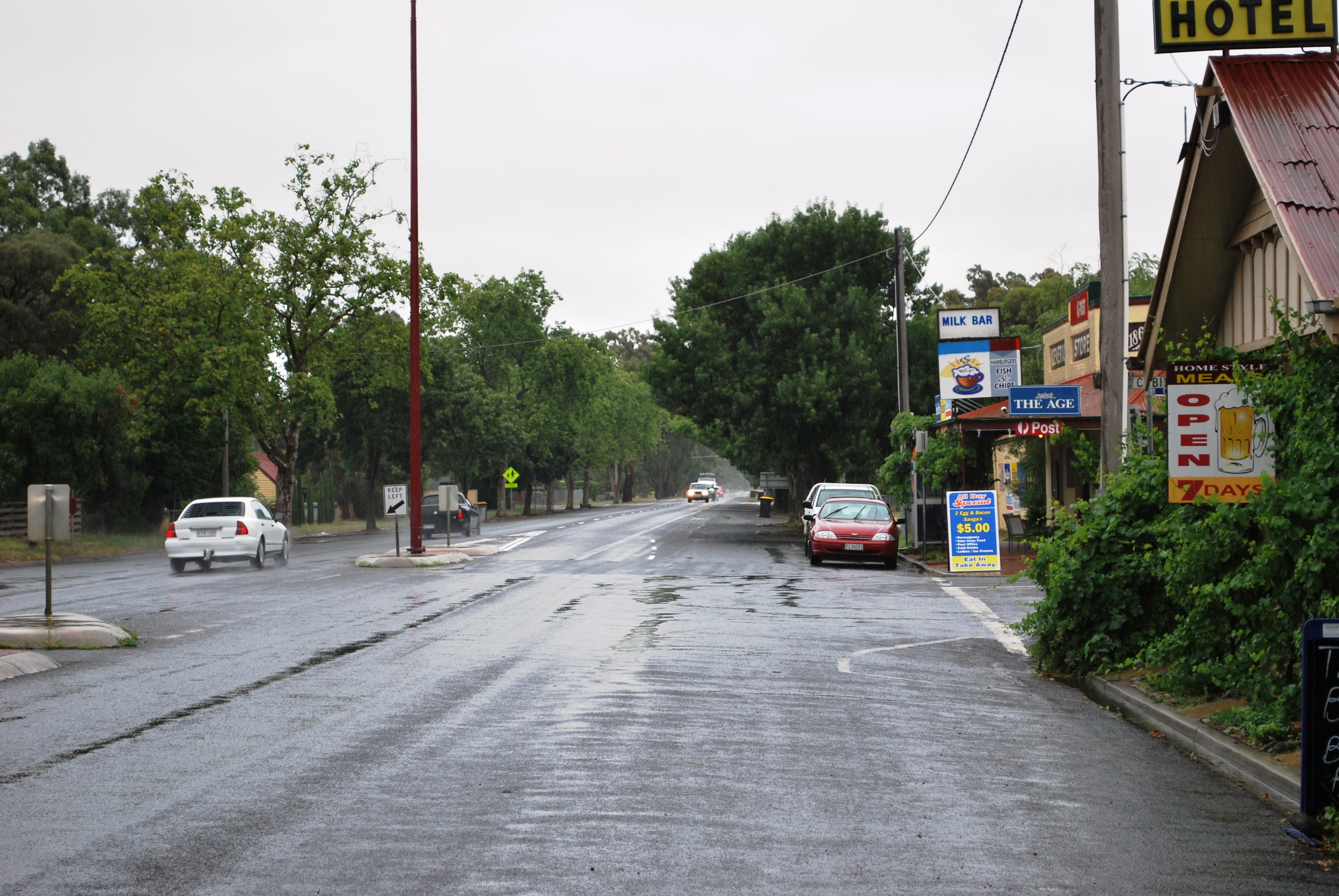
Main Street
