= Joe Helper =

Australian politician

The Honourable Joe Helper

Member of the Victorian Legislative Assembly for Ripon
- In office 18 September 1999 – 29 November 2014
- Preceded by: Steve Elder
- Succeeded by: Louise Staley

Personal details
- Born: 29 September 1959 (age 66) Germany
- Party: Labor Party

Jochen "Joe" Helper (born 29 September 1959) is an Australian politician who represented Ripon in the Victorian Legislative Assembly from 1999 to 2014, representing the Labor Party.

Helper was first elected in the 1999 election on the back of the anti-Kennett rural swing and has held this normally Liberal seat until his resignation in 2014. After the 2006 election Helper was appointed to the cabinet as Minister for Agriculture. He gained the small business portfolio in a reshuffle in August 2007 following the accession of John Brumby to the premiership.

Parliament of Victoria
Preceded by Steve Elder	Member for Ripon; 1999–2014	Succeeded by Louise Staley
Political offices
Preceded by Keith Hamilton	Minister for Agriculture; 2006–2010	Succeeded by Peter Walsh
Preceded by Theo Theophanous	Minister for Small Business; 2007–2010	Succeeded by Louise Asher
