= Martha Haylett =

Australian politician

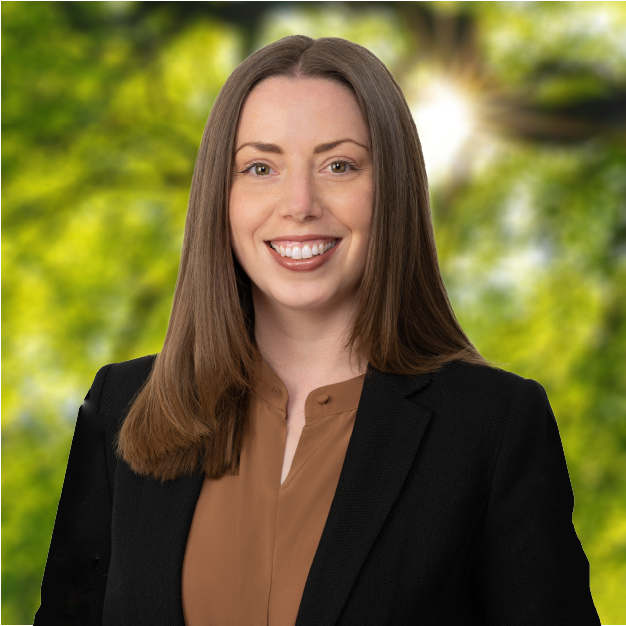

Member of the Victorian Legislative Assembly for Ripon
- Incumbent
- Assumed office 26 November 2022
- Preceded by: Louise Staley
- Majority: Labor

Personal details
- Born: 7 January 1991 (age 35)
- Party: Labor

Martha Haylett is an Australian politician who is the member for the electorate of Ripon in the Victorian Legislative Assembly. She represents the Labor Party and was elected in the 2022 state election, after defeating incumbent Liberal MLA Louise Staley.

== Personal Life ==
Haylett grew up in central Victoria. Before entering Parliament she worked in affordable housing, employment support and regional transport.

Her parliamentary biography says she led campaigns for more social and affordable housing in Victoria.

Haylett lives in Creswick with her husband and their son.

== Political career ==
Haylett announced her candidacy for Ripon on 21 January 2022, and was elected with a margin of 2.7%.

In Haylett’s first speech she labelled the Western Renewables Link project a “disgrace” and demanded that it be fixed.

Haylett has also consistently stated that the VNI west project lacked social license, despite the government’s position on the project.

Haylett has raised road conditions on many occasions since her election in 2022, including in her first speech where she called for substantial upgrades across the district. In August 2026, she asked the Minister for Roads and Road Safety when state-managed roads in her electorate would be repaired, saying road conditions was the issue most often raised with her.

Haylett has also overseen the largest increase in funding for local health services in Ripon’s history. This includes $115 million to redevelop Maryborough Hospital redevelopment, over $16 million for upgrades at Ararat hospital, and the $655 million Ballarat Base Hospital redevelopment.

In August 2026, Haylett was appointed Parliamentary Secretary for Regional and Rural Development.
