= Rutherford Guthrie =

Australian politician

Sir Rutherford Campbell Guthrie CMG (28 November 1899 – 20 February 1990) was an Australian politician.

He was born in Donald to grazier Thomas Oliver Guthrie, brother of Senator James Guthrie, and Jenny Hannah. He attended Melbourne Grammar School and then the University of Cambridge, interrupting his studies to serve in World War I with the Royal Field Artillery. After receiving his Bachelor of Arts in 1921, he returned to Australia in 1922 and became a farmer near Linton. On 29 November 1927 he married Rhona Mary McKellar, with whom he had two sons. During World War II he served with the 9th Division's Cavalry regiment and was wounded at El Alamein. From 1946 to 1974 he served on Ripon Shire Council with three terms as president (1951–52, 1954–55, 1963–64). He also served one term (1947–50) in the Victorian Legislative Assembly as the Liberal member for Ripon, and was Minister of Lands and Soldier Settlement from 1948 to 1950. He was state president of the Liberal and Country Party from 1956 to 1960, and was appointed Companion of the Order of St Michael and St George in 1960. He was state treasurer of the party from 1960 to 1963 and was knighted in 1968. He retired in 1973, settling in Gisborne. Guthrie died in 1990.

Victorian Legislative Assembly
Preceded by Ernie Morton	Member for Ripon; 1947–1950	Succeeded by Ernie Morton
