= Ernie Morton =

Australian politician

Earnest Morton (12 January 1896 – 8 September 1991) was an Australian politician.

He was born in Corowa to labourer David Drysdale Morton and Annie Margaret Ellis. He grew up in Dookie and served with the 6th Light Horse in World War I. On his return he was a local government officer. On 24 June 1922 he married Winifred Keir, with whom he had three children. From 1932 to 1934 he was town clerk at Port Fairy, and from 1934 to 1946 shire secretary at Ararat. In 1945 he was elected to the Victorian Legislative Assembly as the Labor member for Ripon. Defeated in 1947, he was re-elected in 1950 and served as Deputy Speaker from 1952 to 1955. His seat was abolished in 1955 and he was defeated contesting Hampden. He had been widowed in 1949 and on 25 September 1950 had married Daisy Coad. He was shire secretary at Maryborough from 1955 to 1956 and town clerk at Ararat until 1957. From 1953 to 1956 he served on Ararat City Council. He was shire secretary at Dundas from 1957 to 1961 and at Arapiles in 1961. Morton died in 1991.

Victorian Legislative Assembly
New seat	Member for Ripon; 1945–1947	Succeeded by Rutherford Guthrie
Preceded by Rutherford Guthrie	Member for Ripon; 1950–1955	Abolished
