= Marnoo =

Marnoo Victoria
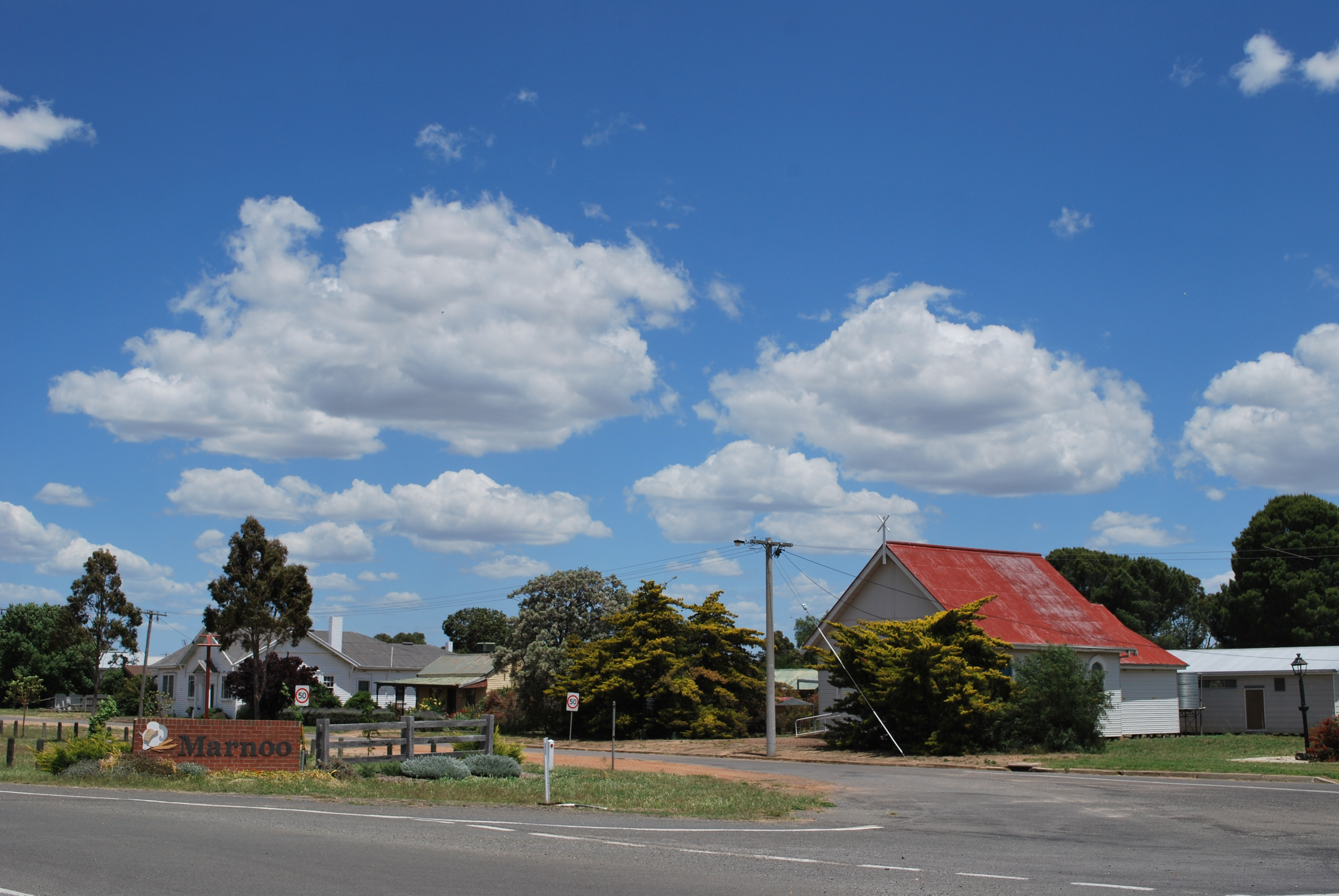
- Entering Marnoo

- Coordinates: 36°39′0″S 142°53′0″E
- Population: 99 (2021 census)
- Postcode(s): 3387
- Location: 288 km (179 mi) NW of Melbourne; 174 km (108 mi) NW of Ballarat; 69 km (43 mi) E of Horsham; 29 km (18 mi) W of St Arnaud
- LGA(s): Shire of Northern Grampians
- State electorate(s): Ripon
- Federal division(s): Mallee

Marnoo is a town in the Wimmera region of Victoria, Australia. Its postal code is 3387. At the 2021 census, Marnoo and the surrounding area had a population of 99.

== Gallery ==
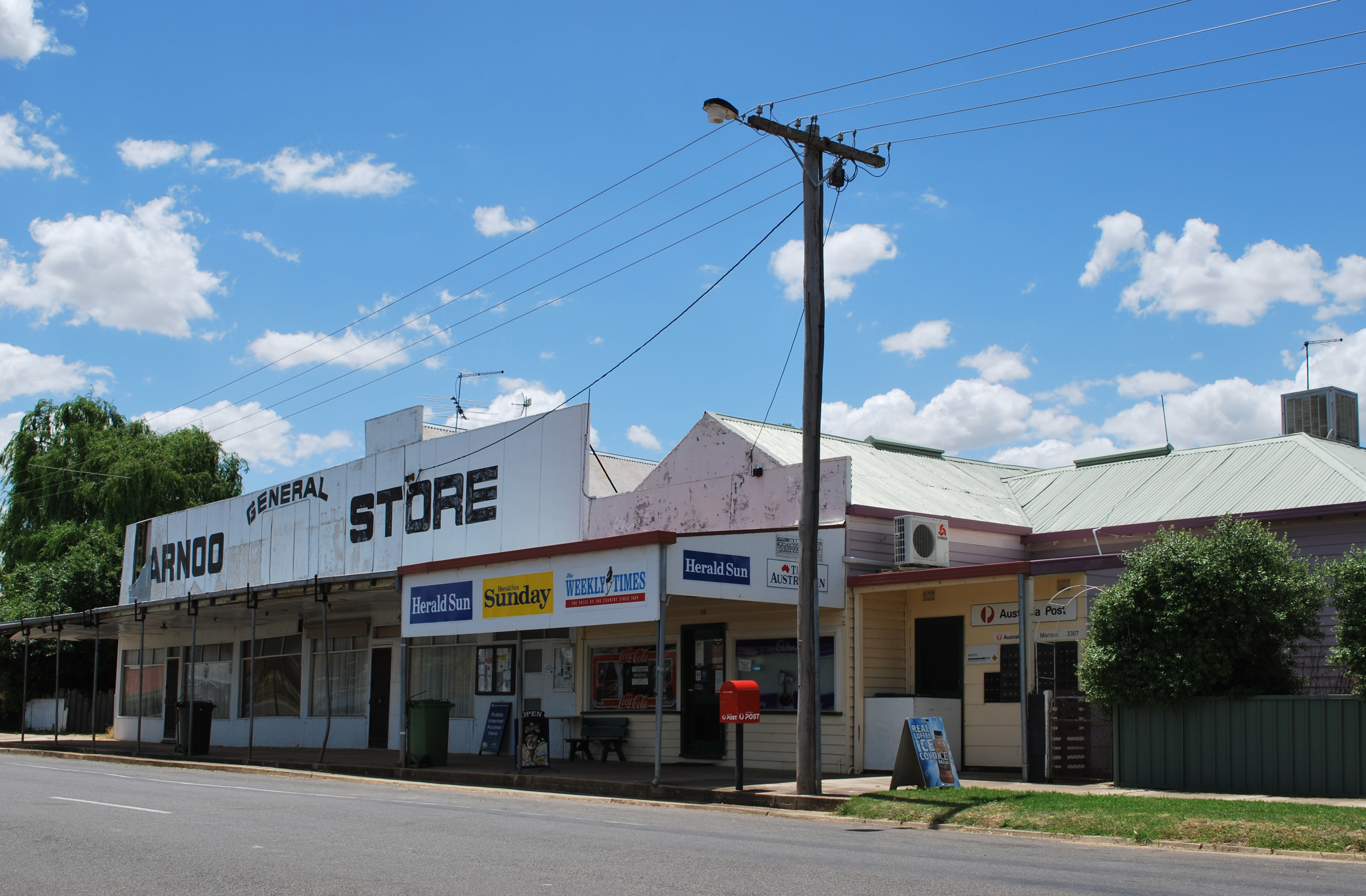
General store in Marnoo

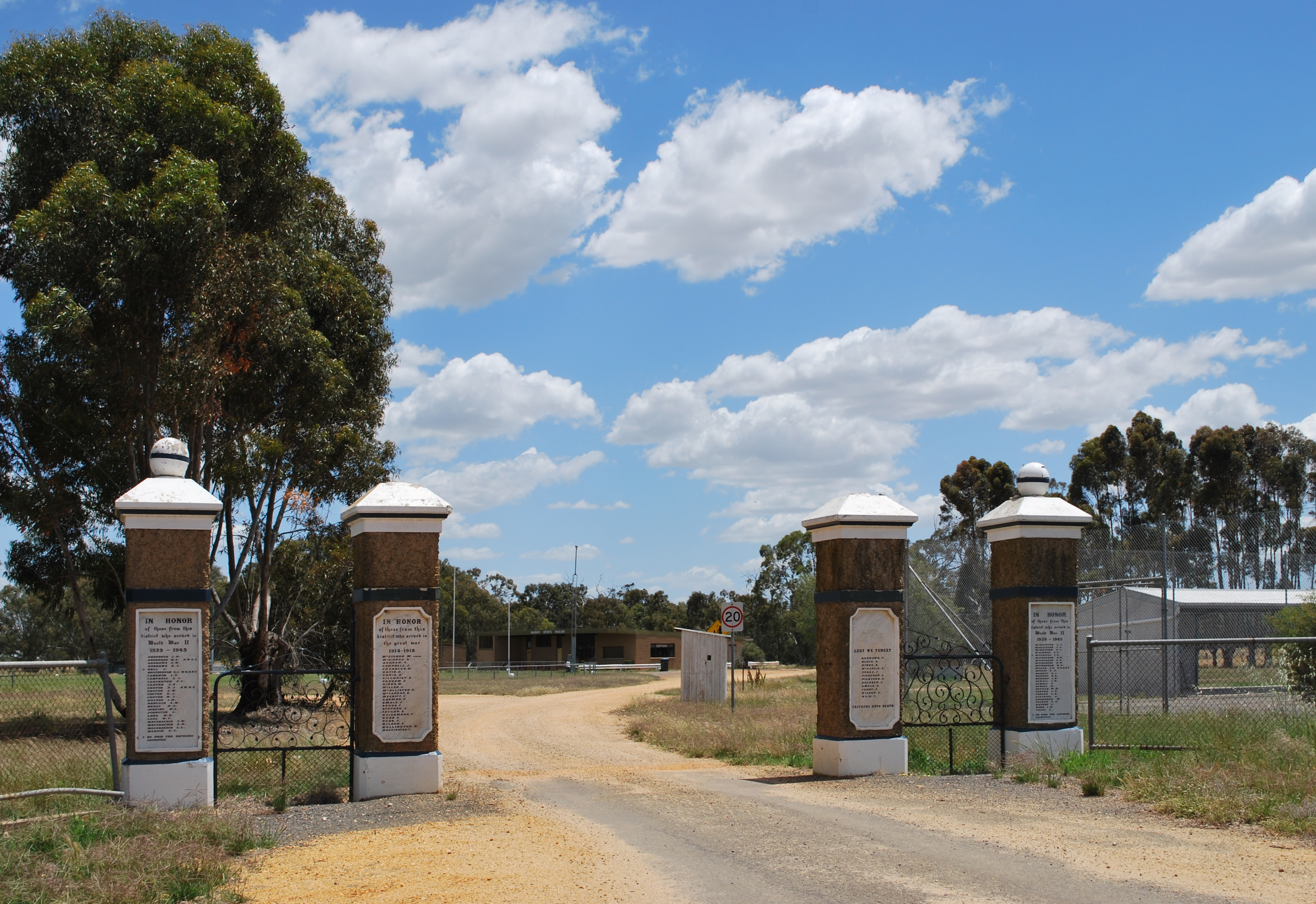
Marnoo War Memorial

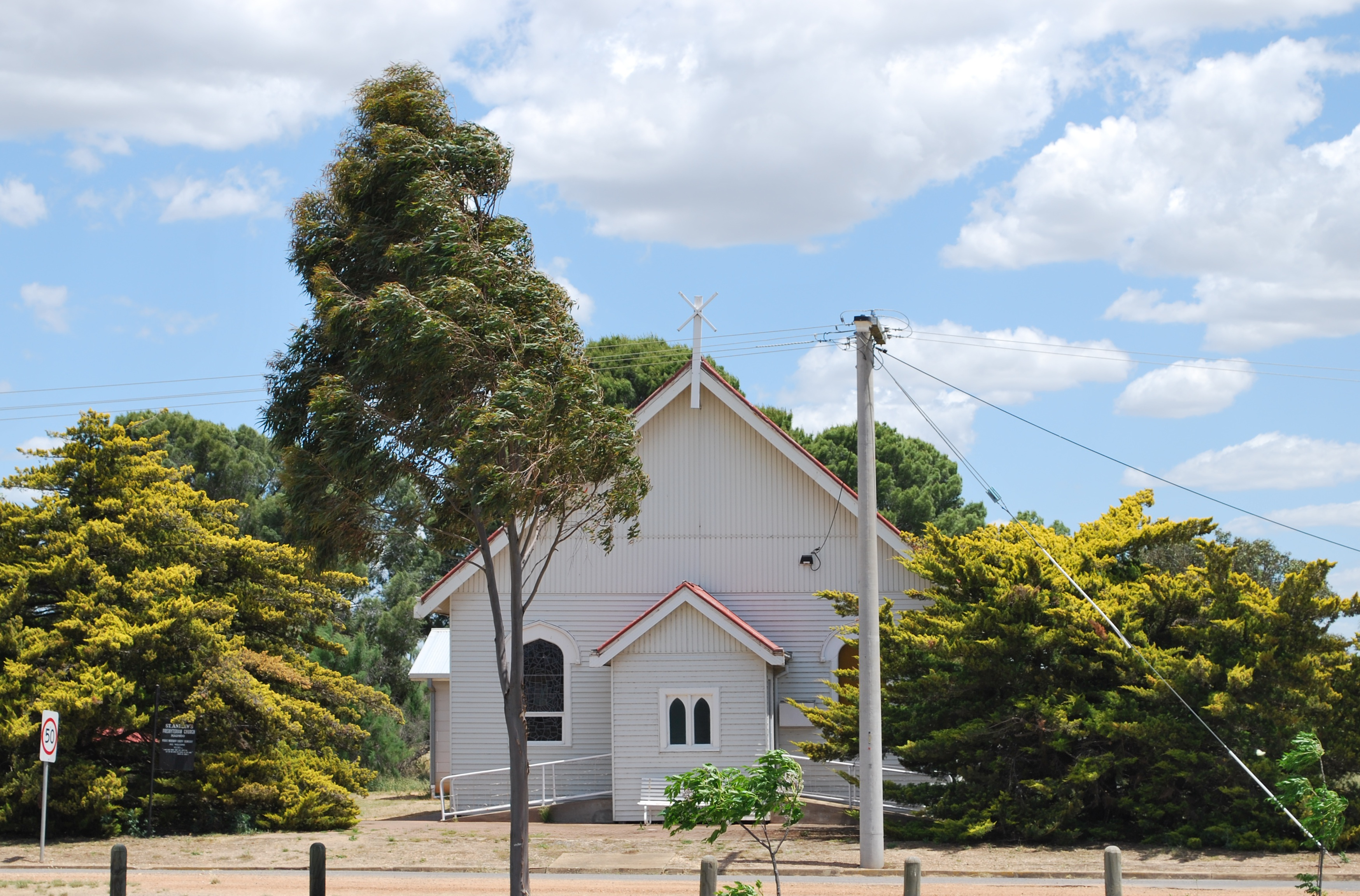
Marnoo Presbyterian Church

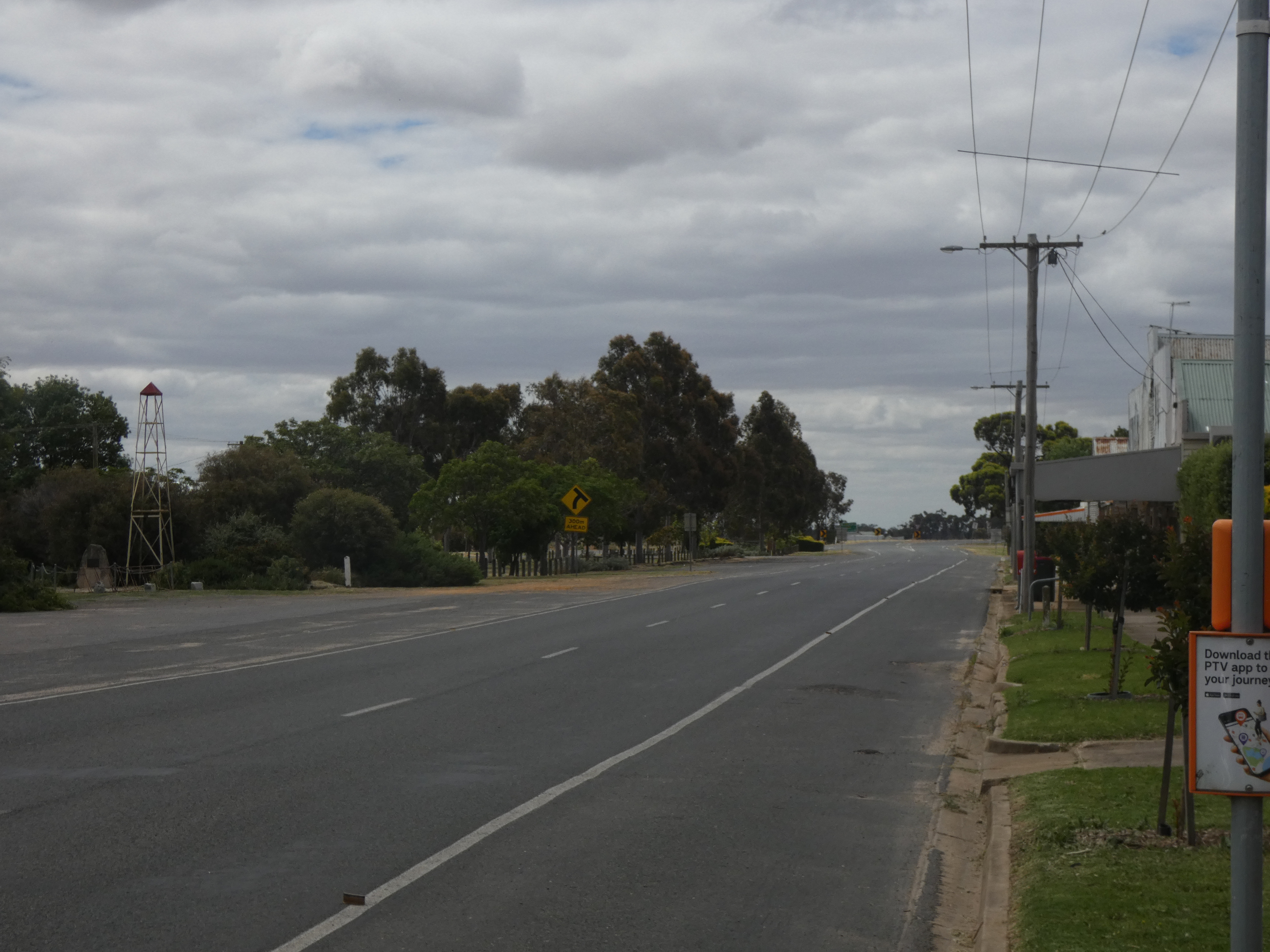
Newall Street
