= Glenorchy, Victoria =

Glenorchy Victoria
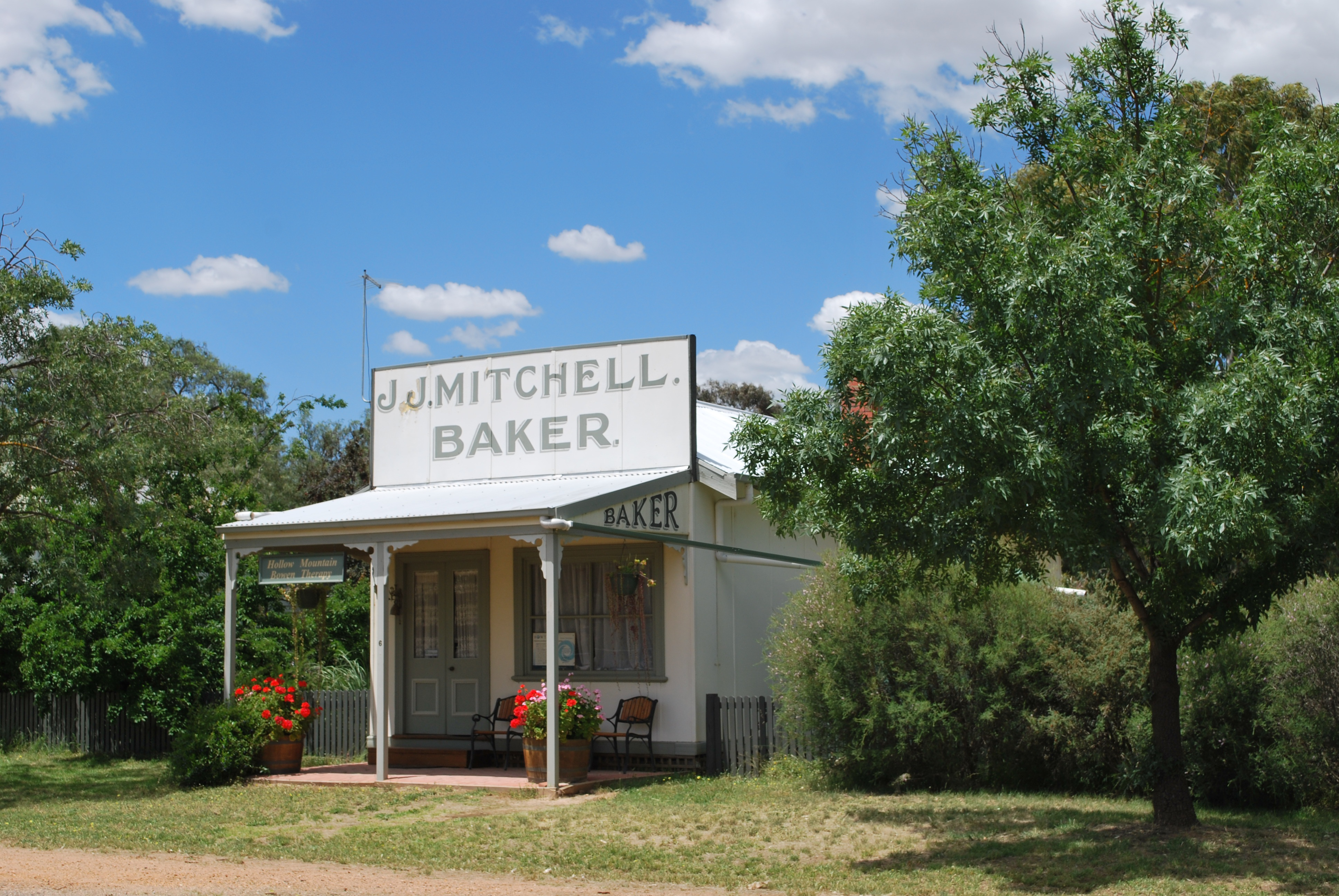
- The former bakery in Glenorchy, now a residence

- Coordinates: 36°54′0″S 142°40′0″E
- Population: 131 (2021 census)
- Postcode(s): 3385
- Location: 257 km (160 mi) NW of Melbourne; 144 km (89 mi) NW of Ballarat; 53 km (33 mi) SE of Horsham; 23 km (14 mi) NW of Stawell
- LGA(s): Shire of Northern Grampians
- State electorate(s): Lowan
- Federal division(s): Wannon

Glenorchy is a town in the Wimmera district of the Australian state of Victoria. The town in located in the Northern Grampians Shire and on the Wimmera River, 257 kilometres (160 mi) north-west of the state capital, Melbourne. At the 2021 census, Glenorchy had a population of 131.

The town was established around the "Four Posts Inn", opened in 1847 and within two years boasted a store, smithy and post office. The town was surveyed in 1850 by Robert Buchanan who named it after Glen Orchy in Scotland.

In 2010, Glenorchy was subjected to flooding after the Wimmera River broke its banks.
