= Shire of Northern Grampians =

Coordinates: 36°39′00″S 143°01′00″E

- Local government area
- Location in Victoria

- Interactive map of Shire of Northern Grampians
- Country: Australia
- State: Victoria
- Region: Grampians
- Established: 1995
- Council seat: Stawell

Government
  - Mayor: Cr Karen Hyslop
  - State electorates: Lowan; Ripon
  - Federal division: Mallee

Area
  - Total: 5,730 km^{2} (2,210 sq mi)

Population
  - Total: 11,431 (2018)
  - Density: 1.9949/km^{2} (5.167/sq mi)
- Gazetted: 20 January 1995
- Website: Shire of Northern Grampians
LGAs around Shire of Northern Grampians
| Yarriambiack | Buloke | Loddon |
| Horsham | Shire of Northern Grampians | Central Goldfields |
| Southern Grampians | Ararat | Pyrenees |

The Shire of Northern Grampians is a local government area in the Wimmera region of Victoria, Australia, located in the western part of the state. It covers an area of 5,730 square kilometres (2,210 mi^{2}) and in June 2018 had a population of 11,431, having fallen from 12,087 in 2008. It includes the city of Stawell, the towns of St Arnaud, Great Western, Marnoo, Glenorchy, Stuart Mill, and Navarre, and the tourist town of Halls Gap.

The Shire is governed and administered by the Northern Grampians Shire Council; its seat of local government and administrative centre is located at the council headquarters in Stawell, it also has a service centre located in St Arnaud. The Shire is named after the major geographical feature in the region, The Grampians, and that the northern part of this feature occupies the southern part of the LGA.

The local economy is based on a diverse range of industries including agriculture, tourism, wine production, gold mining, brick manufacturing and meat production.

== History ==
The Shire of Northern Grampians was formed in 1995 from the amalgamation of the City of Stawell, Town of St Arnaud, Shire of Stawell, Shire of Kara Kara, the Grampians section of the Shire of Wimmera, and parts of the Shire of Dunmunkle and Shire of Donald. Additionally, the Shire of Avoca contributed the southern half of Navarre township, the Shire of Ararat contributed an area on the outskirts of Halls Gap, and the Shire of Arapiles contributed its share of the Grampians National Park.

In January 1996, part of the Richardson River catchment east and south of Rupanyup was transferred from Northern Grampians to the Shire of Yarriambiack after a further Local Government Board review.

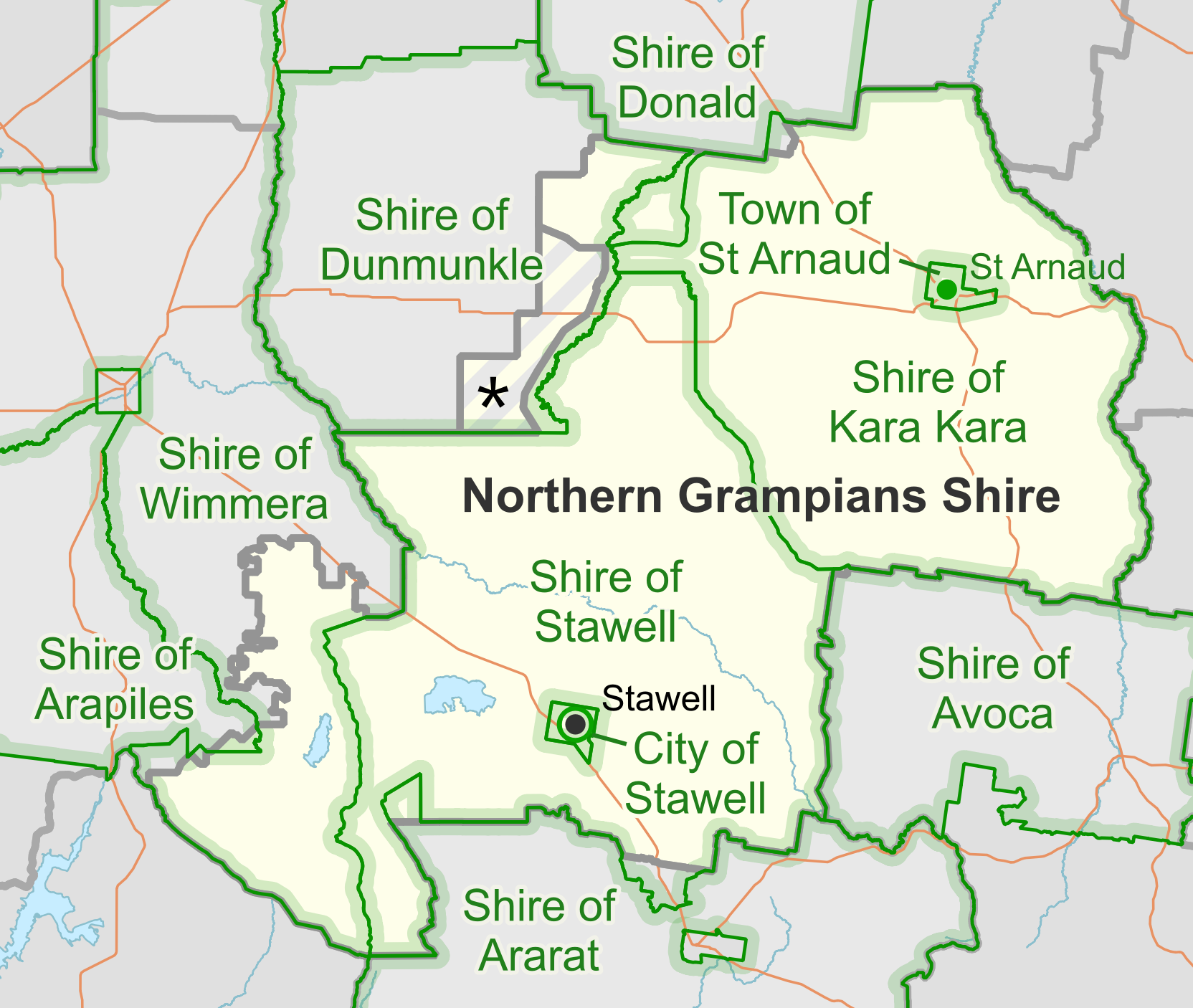
Northern Grampians Shire's predecessor LGAs (green) as they were in 1994. The administrative centres of the former LGAs are marked by green dots. 🞲 Area transferred to Yarriambiack Shire in 1996

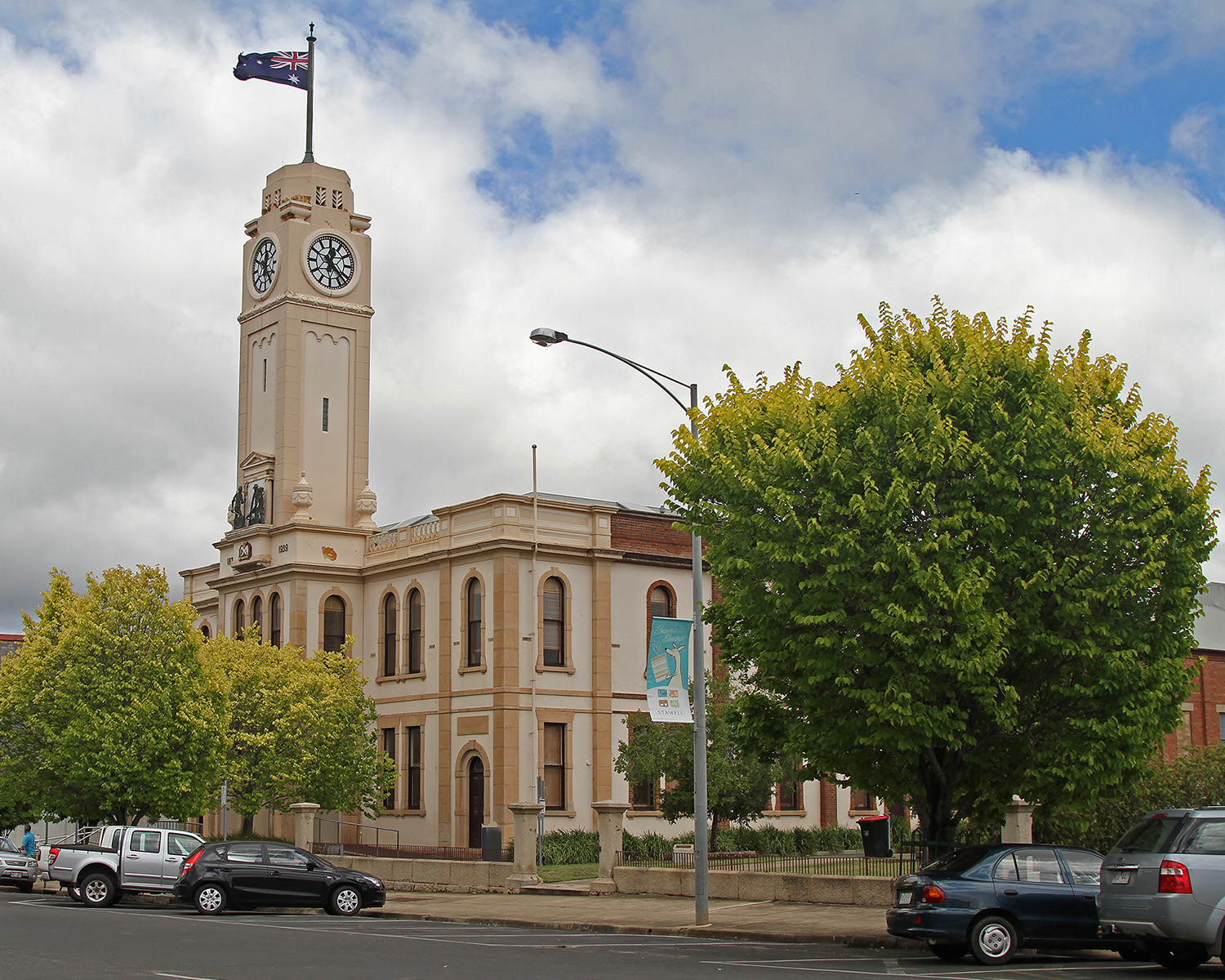
Stawell Town Hall complex, a seat of local government for the Northern Grampians Shire Council

== Council ==
=== Current composition ===
2024 ward boundaries. Expand the map and click on a ward to see the ward name.

The council is composed of three wards and six councillors, with two councillors elected to represent each ward

| Ward | Councillor | Party | Notes |
|---|---|---|---|
| Central | Karen Hyslop | Australian Democrats | Mayor |
| Central | Jenny Greenberger | Independent | |
| Kara Kara | Karen Probst | Independent | |
| Kara Kara | Murray Emerson | Independent | |
| Grampians | Justine Hide | Independent | Deputy Mayor |
| Grampians | Jack Blake | Independent | |

=== Administration and governance ===
The council meets in the council chambers at the council headquarters in the Stawell Town Hall Offices, which is also the location of the council's administrative activities. It also provides customer services at both its administrative centre in Stawell, and its service centre in St Arnaud.

== Traditional owners ==
The traditional owners of the Northern Grampians are the Djab Wurrung, Jardwadjali and Dja Dja Wurrung.

== Cities, towns and localities ==
The 2021 census, the shire had a population of 11,948 up from 11,439 in the 2016 census

Population
| Locality | 2016 | 2021 |
|---|---|---|
| Archdale^ | 21 | 23 |
| Archdale Junction^ | 6 | 12 |
| Avon Plains | 7 | 8 |
| Banyena | 28 | 27 |
| Barkly^ | 43 | 49 |
| Beazleys Bridge | 25 | 24 |
| Bellellen | 57 | 59 |
| Bellfield | * | # |
| Black Range^ | 189 | 274 |
| Bolangum | 0 | 4 |
| Brimpaen^ | 79 | 80 |
| Bulgana | 37 | 19 |
| Callawadda | 43 | 45 |
| Campbells Bridge | 27 | 21 |
| Carapooee | 64 | 60 |
| Carapooee West | 21 | 40 |
| Cherrypool^ | 3 | 3 |
| Concongella | 133 | 146 |
| Coonooer Bridge^ | 31 | 30 |
| Coonooer West | 16 | 18 |
| Cope Cope^ | 58 | 42 |
| Crowlands^ | 89 | 72 |
| Dadswells Bridge^ | 71 | 69 |
| Dalyenong | 0 | 0 |
| Deep Lead | 204 | 210 |
| Dunneworthy^ | 19 | 15 |
| Emu^ | 32 | 37 |
| Fyans Creek | 38 | 47 |
| Germania | 12 | 17 |
| Glenisla^ | 16 | 23 |
| Glenorchy | 125 | 131 |
| Gooroc | 19 | 19 |
| Gowar East^ | 20 | 23 |
| Grays Bridge | 3 | 0 |
| Gre Gre | 19 | 10 |
| Gre Gre North | 19 | 13 |
| Gre Gre South | 13 | 19 |
| Great Western^ | 400 | 425 |
| Greens Creek | 52 | 52 |
| Halls Gap^ | 430 | 495 |
| Illawarra | 82 | 80 |
| Joel Joel | 22 | 17 |
| Joel South | 25 | 26 |
| Kanya | 12 | 17 |
| Kooreh | 31 | 29 |
| Laen^ | * | 4 |
| Laharum^ | 196 | 162 |
| Lake Fyans | 27 | 23 |
| Lake Lonsdale | 43 | 58 |
| Landsborough West^ | 41 | 49 |
| Ledcourt | 44 | 43 |
| Logan^ | 53 | 59 |
| Lubeck^ | 36 | 40 |
| Marnoo | 122 | 99 |
| Marnoo East | 4 | 6 |
| Marnoo West | 17 | 11 |
| Mokepilly | 14 | 6 |
| Moolerr | 18 | 23 |
| Morrl Morrl | 4 | 0 |
| Mount Dryden | 6 | 8 |
| Moyreisk | 30 | 31 |
| Natte Yallock^ | 94 | 89 |
| Navarre^ | 98 | 99 |
| Paradise | 42 | 41 |
| Pomonal^ | 322 | 356 |
| Redbank^ | 94 | 102 |
| Riachella | 3 | 13 |
| Rich Avon East | 3 | 7 |
| Rich Avon West | 29 | 34 |
| Roses Gap | 3 | 7 |
| Rostron | 16 | 10 |
| Rupanyup^ | 536 | 545 |
| Shays Flat^ | 13 | 3 |
| Slaty Creek^ | 37 | 34 |
| St Arnaud | 2,193 | 2,318 |
| St Arnaud East | 81 | 100 |
| St Arnaud North | 44 | 43 |
| Stawell | 6,032 | 6,220 |
| Stuart Mill | 79 | 78 |
| Sutherland | 22 | 16 |
| Swanwater | 18 | 10 |
| Swanwater West | 14 | 17 |
| Tottington | 6 | 5 |
| Traynors Lagoon | 29 | 22 |
| Tulkara | 3 | 9 |
| Wal Wal | 27 | 37 |
| Wallaloo | 16 | 11 |
| Wallaloo East | 9 | 12 |
| Wartook^ | 84 | 88 |
| Wattle Creek^ | 0 | 0 |
| Winjallok | 17 | 18 |
| York Plains | 0 | 0 |
| Zumsteins | 0 | 0 |

^ - Territory divided with another LGA
* - Not noted in 2016 Census # - Not noted in 2021 Census

== See also ==
- List of places of worship in Northern Grampians Shire
- List of localities (Victoria)
