= Electoral district of Ripon =

State electoral district of Victoria, Australia

Ripon Victoria—Legislative Assembly
- Interactive map of electoral district boundaries from the 2022 state election
- State: Victoria
- Dates current: 1945–1955; 1976–present
- MP: Martha Haylett
- Party: Labor
- Namesake: Shire of Ripon
- Electors: 47,774 (2018)
- Area: 14,444 km^{2} (5,576.9 sq mi)
- Demographic: Rural
- Coordinates: 36°57′0″S 143°15′36″E
Electorates around Ripon:
Lowan	Mildura	Murray Plains; Bendigo East
Lowan	Ripon	Bendigo West; Macedon
Lowan	Eureka; Polwarth	Wendouree; Eureka

Ripon is a single member electoral district of the Victorian Legislative Assembly. It is a rural electorate based in western Victoria. In 1946 the electoral district of Ripon was first contested but then abolished in the 1955 election after being held by Labor for seven of these years. Ripon was re-created in 1976, essentially as a replacement for Hampden and Kara Kara.

Ripon has an area of 16,761 square kilometres. It includes the towns of Amphitheatre, Ararat, Avoca, Bealiba, Beaufort, Borung, Bridgewater on Loddon, Buangor, Cardigan, Carisbrook, Charlton, Clunes, Creswick, Dunolly, Eddington, Elmhurst, Glenorchy, Great Western, Inglewood, Landsborough, Lexton, Lucas, Marnoo, Maryborough, Miners Rest, Moonambel, Newbridge, Snake Valley, St Arnaud, Stawell, Stuart Mill, Talbot, Tarnagulla and Wedderburn. The main population centres are Creswick, Ararat, Maryborough, Beaufort, Avoca, Bridgewater on Loddon, St Arnaud and Stawell. This district is known for agriculture, wine making, timber industries, manufacturing, wool production, paper milling, knitting mills and tourism.

It has been held by the Liberal Party for most of its history. However, it was one of several country seats that unexpectedly fell to Labor Party in 1999 as part of Labor's shock victory that year. Labor would hold the seat until 2014, and reclaimed it in 2022. The 2018 result was the subject of a legal challenge by the second placed Labor candidate.

In the 2021 redistribution, the boundaries of Ripon moved southeast, losing Donald and Charlton to Mildura, and Stawell to Lowan, and also gaining rural towns to the north, west and southwest of Ballarat from the abolished district of Buninyong. As a result, it is estimated that Ripon would be a Labor marginal seat from results of the 2018 election with a margin of 2.8%.

== Members ==
First incarnation (1945–1955)
Member	Party	Term
Ernie Morton	Labor	1945–1947
Rutherford Guthrie	Liberal	1947–1950
Ernie Morton	Labor	1950–1955

Second incarnation (1976–present)
Member	Party	Term
Tom Austin	Liberal	1976–1992
Steve Elder	Liberal	1992–1999
Joe Helper	Labor	1999–2014
Louise Staley	Liberal	2014–2022
Martha Haylett	Labor	2022–present

== Election results ==
2022 Victorian state election: Ripon
Party	Candidate	Votes	%	±%
Labor	Martha Haylett	16,321	38.5	−2.5
Liberal	Louise Staley	15,305	36.2	–0.6
Shooters, Fishers, Farmers	Luke Smith	3,606	8.5	+3.1
Greens	Earl James	2,524	6.0	+1.3
Family First	Craig George	1,316	3.1	+3.1
Animal Justice	Holly Sitters	1,145	2.7	+0.3
Justice	Wren Louise Wilson	940	2.2	−1.8
Independent	Wayne Rigg	872	2.1	+2.1
Independent	Bernard Quince	312	0.7	+0.7
Total formal votes		42,341	93.2	+1.4
Informal votes		3,111	6.8	−1.4
Turnout		45,452	89.5	−3.7
Two-party-preferred result
Labor	Martha Haylett	22,438	53.0	+0.2
Liberal	Louise Staley	19,903	47.0	–0.2
Labor notional hold		Swing	+0.2	
