= Shire of Charlton =

Coordinates: 36°16′S 143°21′E

Shire of Charlton Victoria
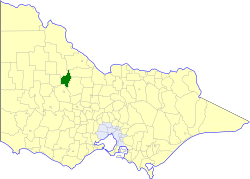
- Location in Victoria
- The Shire of Charlton as at its dissolution in 1995
- Population: 1,850 (1992)
  - Density: 1.574/km^{2} (4.078/sq mi)
- Established: 1895
- Area: 1,175 km^{2} (453.7 sq mi)
- Council seat: Charlton
- Region: Mallee
- County: Gladstone, Kara Kara, Tatchera
LGAs around Shire of Charlton:
Wycheproof	Kerang	Gordon
Donald	Shire of Charlton	Korong
Kara Kara	Kara Kara	Korong

The Shire of Charlton was a local government area about 240 kilometres (149 mi) north-northwest of Melbourne, the state capital of Victoria, Australia. The shire covered an area of 1,175 square kilometres (453.7 sq mi), and existed from 1895 until 1995.

== History ==
Charlton was first incorporated as a shire on 28 May 1895, upon the severance of portions of the Shires of Gordon, Kerang and St Arnaud.

On 20 January 1995, the Shire of Charlton was abolished, and along with the Shires of Birchip, Donald and Wycheproof, and parts of the Shire of Kara Kara, was merged into the newly created Shire of Buloke.

== Wards ==
The Shire of Charlton was divided into three ridings on 25 May 1988, each of which elected three councillors:

- North Riding
- South Riding
- West Riding

== Towns and localities ==
- Barrakee
- Buckrabanyule
- Charlton*
- Coonooer Bridge
- Dooboobetic
- Glenloth
- Nareewillock
- Teddywaddy
- Terrappee
- Wooroonook
- Yawong
- Yeungroon

* Council seat.

== Population ==
Year	Population
1954	2,350
1958	2,510*
1961	2,492
1966	2,492
1971	2,226
1976	2,120
1981	2,063
1986	1,968
1991	1,749

* Estimate in the 1958 Victorian Year Book.
