= Shire of Birchip =

Coordinates: 35°59′S 142°56′E

- Local government area
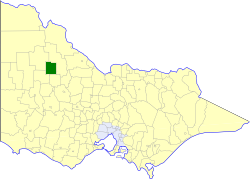
- Location in Victoria
- The Shire of Birchip as at its dissolution in 1995
- Country: Australia
- State: Victoria
- Region: Mallee
- Established: 1895
- Council seat: Birchip

Area
  - Total: 1,468 km^{2} (567 sq mi)

Population
  - Total: 1,270 (1992)
  - Density: 0.865/km^{2} (2.241/sq mi)
- County: Tatchera, Karkarooc, Borung
LGAs around Shire of Birchip
Karkarooc	Wycheproof	Wycheproof
Karkarooc	Shire of Birchip	Wycheproof
Warracknabeal	Donald	Donald

The Shire of Birchip was a local government area about 170 kilometres (106 mi) northwest of Bendigo, in northwestern Victoria, Australia. The shire covered an area of 1,468 square kilometres (566.8 sq mi), and existed from 1895 until 1995.

== History ==
Birchip was first incorporated as a shire on 6 April 1895. It was originally gazetted as the Shire of Wirmbirchip, with the error being fixed on 8 November 1895. On 22 May 1896, it annexed parts of the Shire of Borung.

On 20 January 1995, the Shire of Birchip was abolished, and along with the Shires of Charlton, Donald and Wycheproof, and parts of the Shire of Kara Kara, was merged into the newly created Shire of Buloke.

== Wards ==
The Shire of Birchip was divided into three ridings on 31 May 1988, each of which elected three councillors:

- North Riding
- South Riding
- West Riding

== Towns and localities ==
- Ballapur
- Birchip*
- Curyo
- Jil Jil
- Karyrie
- Kinnabulla
- Lake Tchum
- Morton Plains
- Reedy Dam
- Warmur
- Watchupga
- Whirily
- Wilkur South

* Council seat.

== Population ==
Year	Population
1954	1,745
1958	1,860*
1961	1,899
1966	1,921
1971	1,739
1976	1,555
1981	1,466
1986	1,339
1991	1,249

* Estimate in the 1958 Victorian Year Book.
