= Shire of Wycheproof =

Coordinates: 36°05′S 143°13′E

- Local government area
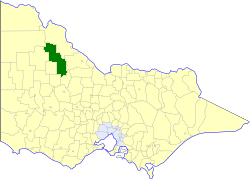
- Location in Victoria
- The Shire of Wycheproof as at its dissolution in 1995
- Country: Australia
- State: Victoria
- Region: Mallee
- Established: 1894
- Council seat: Wycheproof

Area
  - Total: 4,110.3 km^{2} (1,587.0 sq mi)

Population
  - Total: 3,130 (1992)
  - Density: 0.7615/km^{2} (1.972/sq mi)
- County: Borung, Tatchera, Karkarooc, Kara Kara
LGAs around Shire of Wycheproof
Walpeup	Swan Hill	Swan Hill
Karkarooc	Shire of Wycheproof	Kerang
Birchip	Donald	Charlton

The Shire of Wycheproof was a local government area about 130 kilometres (81 mi) northwest of Bendigo in northwestern Victoria, Australia. The shire covered an area of 4,110.3 square kilometres (1,587.0 sq mi), and existed from 1894 until 1995.

== History ==
Wycheproof was originally part of the St Arnaud Road District, which was incorporated in 1861, and became a Shire in 1864. On 27 April 1894, the North Riding of the Shire was severed and proclaimed as the Shire of Wycheproof, after a successful petition from the residents of Wycheproof to the Commissioner of Public Works. Over the years, several boundary changes occurred:

- 31 May 1897 - Parts of the Shire of Castle Donnington was annexed as the Tyrrell Riding.
- 28 April 1898 - Parts of the Shire of Donald was annexed to the South Riding.
- 31 May 1906 - Wycheproof lost parts of its Tyrrell Riding to the Shire of Karkarooc.
- 21 December 1936 - Parts of the Shire of Swan Hill annexed as part of the Tyrrell Riding
- 10 May 1949 - Wycheproof lost parts of its Central Riding to the Shire of Birchip.

On 20 January 1995, the Shire of Wycheproof was abolished, and along with the Shires of Birchip, Charlton, Donald and parts of the Shire of Kara Kara, was merged into the newly created Shire of Buloke.

== Wards ==
Wycheproof was divided into four ridings, each of which elected three councillors, except for Bunguluke which elected two councillors.

- Bunguluke Riding
- Myall Riding
- Thalia Riding
- Tyrrell Riding

== Towns and localities ==
- Banyan
- Berriwillock
- Boigbeat
- Bunguluke
- Carapugna
- Culgoa
- Dumosa
- Fairview
- Glenloth
- Kalpienung
- Nandaly
- Narraport
- Ninda
- Nullawil
- Nyarrin
- Pier Milan
- Sea Lake
- Thalia
- Towaninnie
- Tyrrell Creek
- Warne
- Willangie
- Winston
- Wycheproof*

* Council seat.

== Population ==
Year	Population
1954	4,548
1958	4,760*
1961	4,747
1966	4,775
1971	4,413
1976	4,161
1981	3,783
1986	3,322
1991	3,008

* Estimate in the 1958 Victorian Year Book.
