= List of places of worship in Buloke Shire =

This is a list of places of worship in the Shire of Buloke, a local government area in the state of Victoria, Australia. The list includes active and former churches and other religious buildings representing a variety of Christian denominations and other faiths.

St Andrew's Uniting Church, Donald

== Heritage listing status ==
Style	Status
Yes	Listed on the Victorian Heritage Register
–	Not listed

== Current places of worship ==
Current places of worship
Name	Image	Location	Denomination/ Affiliation	Heritage listing	Notes	Refs
St George's Anglican Church		Donald; 36.371116°S 142.985084°E	Anglican	–		
St Mary's Catholic Church, Donald		Donald; 36.373393°S 142.985605°E	Catholic	–		
St Andrew's Uniting Church, Donald (Donald Uniting Church)		Donald; 36.372165°S 142.984488°E	Uniting (formerly Presbyterian)	–		
Charlton Uniting Church		Charlton; 36.267650°S 143.347066°E	Uniting (formerly Methodist)	–		
St Martin's Anglican Church		Charlton; 36.269773°S 143.349488°E	Anglican	–		
St Joseph's Catholic Church, Charlton		Charlton; 36.271461°S 143.351219°E	Catholic	–		
St Paul's Anglican Church		Birchip; 35.982855°S 142.919194°E	Anglican	–		
St Mary's Catholic Church, Birchip		Birchip; 35.984654°S 142.918128°E	Catholic	–		
Birchip Uniting Church		Birchip; 35.979102°S 142.914971°E	Uniting (formerly Presbyterian)	–		
Wycheproof Uniting Church		Wycheproof; 36.075460°S 143.227564°E	Uniting (formerly Methodist)	–		
St Michael's Catholic Church		Wycheproof; 36.076203°S 143.221010°E	Catholic	–		
Sea Lake Uniting Church		Sea Lake; 35.504541°S 142.853657°E	Uniting	–		
St Mary's Catholic Church, Sea Lake		Sea Lake; 35.501881°S 142.849953°E	Catholic	–		
Berriwillock Anglican & Uniting Church		Berriwillock; 35.636409°S 142.992615°E	Anglican & Uniting (formerly Uniting)	–		
Nullawil Uniting Church		Nullawil; 35.853874°S 143.178576°E	Uniting (formerly Methodist)	–		
St Joseph's Catholic Church, Nullawil		Nullawil; 35.852081°S 143.178864°E	Catholic	–		
St Joseph's Catholic Church, Nandaly		Nandaly; 35.311062°S 142.699485°E	Catholic	–		

== Former places of worship ==
Former places of worship
Name	Image	Location	Denomination/ Affiliation	Heritage listing	Notes	Refs
Jeffcott Methodist Church		Donald; 36.374821°S 142.871895°E	Methodist	–		
St Andrew's Presbyterian Church, Charlton		Charlton; 36.268000°S 143.348246°E	Presbyterian	Non-existent		
Willangie Anglican Church		Willangie; 35.719550°S 142.796748°E	Anglican	–		
St Aidan's Anglican Church		Watchem; 36.148377°S 142.860415°E	Anglican	–		
St Joseph's Catholic Church, Watchem		Watchem; 36.150566°S 142.859356°E	Catholic	–		
Watchem Uniting Church		Watchem; 36.148814°S 142.860669°E	Uniting (formerly Methodist)	–		
Wycheproof Anglican Church		Wycheproof; 36.076637°S 143.227460°E	Anglican	–		
St Andrew's Presbyterian Church, Wycheproof		Wycheproof; 36.077421°S 143.228891°E	Presbyterian	–		
Sea Lake Lutheran Church		Sea Lake; 35.503946°S 142.858702°E	Lutheran	–		
Sea Lake Christian Fellowship		Sea Lake; 35.502327°S 142.853645°E	Non-denominational	–		
St Aidan's Anglican Church, Sea Lake		Sea Lake; 35.501822°S 142.852425°E	Anglican	–		
Corack East Uniting Church		Corack East; 36.166184°S 143.042964°E	Uniting (formerly Methodist)	–		
Culgoa Uniting Church (St John's Presbyterian Church)		Culgoa; 35.715637°S 143.105658°E	Uniting (formerly Presbyterian)	–		
Sacred Heart Catholic Church, Culgoa		Culgoa; 35.714557°S 143.106421°E	Catholic	–		
St John's Anglican Church, Berriwillock		Berriwillock; 35.636747°S 142.992721°E	Anglican	Non-existent		

== See also ==
- List of places of worship in Golden Plains Shire
- List of places of worship in Southern Grampians Shire
- List of places of worship in the City of Greater Geelong
