= Lake Marmal =

- Town
- Coordinates: 36°09′03″S 143°31′53″E
- Country: Australia
- State: Victoria
- LGAs: Shire of Loddon; Shire of Buloke
- Location: 224 km (139 mi) NW of Melbourne; 109 km (68 mi) W of Echuca; 18 km (11 mi) SW of Boort

Government
  - State electorate: Mildura
  - Federal division: Mallee

Population
  - Total: 21 (2021 census)
- Postcode: 3525
Localities around Lake Marmal
Glenloth East	Barraport West	Catumnal
Nareewillock	Lake Marmal	Terrappee
Nareewillock	Buckrabanyule	Terrappee

Lake Marmal is a locality in the Shire of Buloke and the Shire of Loddon, Victoria, Australia. At the 2021 census, Lake Marmal had a population of 21.

== History ==
The post office opened on 17 August 1878 and was closed on 28 February 1959.
