= Bunguluke =

Bunguluke Victoria
- Coordinates: 36°03′16″S 143°23′12″E
- Population: 21 (2016 census)
- Postcode(s): 3527
- Location: 271 km (168 mi) from Melbourne; 17 km (11 mi) from Wycheproof; 27 km (17 mi) from Charlton
- LGA(s): Shire of Buloke
- State electorate(s): Mildura
- Federal division(s): Mallee
Localities around Bunguluke:
Towaninny South	Jeruk	Glenloth East
Wycheproof	Bunguluke	Glenloth East
Wycheproof	Glenloth	Nareewillock

Bunguluke is a locality in Victoria, Australia, located approximately 17 km from Wycheproof, Victoria.

Bunguluke used to be known as Bungeluke. Bungeluke Post Office opened on 18 October 1875 and closed in 1942. A post office was open at Bungeluke North from 1878 until 1895 and from 1902 until 1930. A Bungeluke Railway Station office opened in 1884 and was renamed Fairview some months later and a Bungeluke West office opened in 1880 became Tyrrell Creek in 1882.

Bunguluke is located near a section of the Avoca River, which runs through the middle of the locality.
