= Brisbane Street Art Festival =

Public art festival in Brisbane, Australia (2016–2025)

- Genre: Street art and public art festival
- Frequency: Annual
- Locations: Brisbane, Queensland, Australia
- Years active: 2016–2025
- Inaugurated: February 2016
- Founders: Lincoln Savage, David Don
- Organiser: Vast Yonder
- Website: bsafest.com.au

The Brisbane Street Art Festival (BSAF) is an annual street art and public art festival held in Brisbane, Queensland, Australia, between 2016 and 2025. Over ten editions the festival commissioned local, interstate and international artists to paint large-scale murals and present exhibitions, workshops and tours across the city. The festival did not proceed in 2026 after organisers were unable to secure sufficient funding, with organisers stating they intended to return in 2027.

== History ==
The inaugural festival was held over a week in February 2016, organised by Lincoln Savage and David Don. More than 25 artists painted walls across Brisbane using about 1,400 cans of paint, with participants including Guido van Helten, Drapl, Sofles and Joel Fergie ("The Zookeeper"). Organisers framed the event as a way to break down stereotypes about graffiti artists by letting the public watch works being created and speak with the artists.

The festival returned in subsequent years with a growing program. The 2018 edition ran until mid-April and drew attention to the participation of female street artists. By 2019 the festival produced more than 60 artworks in a single edition, and its program that year included murals by female Indigenous artists encouraging enrolment in a First Nations business program.

In 2020 the festival expanded beyond Brisbane for the first time, presenting a program of murals in Ipswich. As part of creative activations for the Cross River Rail project, the festival curated the Albert Street Outdoor Art Gallery, a temporary installation of works by emerging and established artists on a city-centre construction site. A festival mural in Albert Street by Maiawali, Karuwali, Pitta Pitta and Gomeroi artist Dylan Bolger depicted the macaranga plant as a symbol of Aboriginal culture regenerating after colonisation.

The 2022 edition brought about 50 new large-scale murals to the city. During that festival, Russian artist Viktoria Veisbrut painted a mural depicting her vision of peace at Howard Smith Wharves amid Russia's invasion of Ukraine. The festival was also featured in an episode of the ABC television arts program Art Works.

In 2024, festival director Lincoln Savage said the event attracted between 25 and 50 artists each year from South America, China, Hong Kong, Europe, the United States and Australia.

The tenth edition, held from 10 to 18 May 2025, marked the festival's ten-year milestone. Its program spanned Northshore, Spring Hill, the central business district, Fish Lane and other precincts, and included the Australian return of the international graffiti event Meeting of Styles. Participating artists included Fintan Magee, Sofles, Leans, Carley Cornelissen, Dean Tyson, Rossella RZ and Simon Degroot.

In March 2026 organisers announced the festival would not be held that year, citing an inability to secure the government and partner investment required for a free, large-scale public art festival. Organisers described the cancellation as "a pause, not a full stop" and said they would focus on returning in 2027.

== Format ==
The festival has been described as an annual multi-week public art festival providing a platform for emerging and established artists. Alongside mural painting, programs have included exhibitions, artist demonstrations, workshops in aerosol techniques, lettering and other media, and street art tours.
