= Terrappee =

- Town
- Coordinates: 36°09′17″S 143°34′35″E
- Country: Australia
- State: Victoria
- LGAs: Shire of Loddon; Shire of Buloke
- Location: 221 km (137 mi) NW of Melbourne; 92 km (57 mi) SW of Bendigo; 23 km (14 mi) SE of Charlton

Government
  - State electorate: Mildura
  - Federal division: Mallee

Population
  - Total: 20 (2021 census)
- Postcode: 3525
Localities around Terrappee
Lake Marmal	Catumnal	Boort
Lake Marmal	Terrappee	Boort
Buckrabanyule	Buckrabanyule	Wychitella North

Terrappee is a locality in the Shire of Buloke and the Shire of Loddon, Victoria, Australia. At the 2021 census, Terrappee had a population of 20.

== History ==
The name is of Djadjawurrung origin. The post office there opened as Terrapee [sic] on 13 October 1887 and was closed on 1 December 1927.
