= City of Stawell =

Coordinates: 37°03′S 142°46′E

City of Stawell Victoria
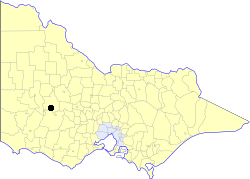
- Location in Victoria
- The City of Stawell as at its dissolution in 1995
- Population: 6,640 (1992)
  - Density: 279.81/km^{2} (724.7/sq mi)
- Established: 1869
- Area: 23.73 km^{2} (9.2 sq mi)
- Council seat: Stawell
- Region: Grampians
- County: Borung

The City of Stawell was a local government area about 230 kilometres (143 mi) west-northwest of Melbourne, the state capital of Victoria, Australia. The city covered an area of 23.73 square kilometres (9.2 sq mi), and existed from 1869 until 1995. Its area was surrounded by the separate and largely rural Shire of Stawell.

== History ==
Stawell was incorporated as a borough on 12 November 1869, and became a town on 18 September 1957. It was proclaimed a city on 12 November 1989.

On 20 January 1995, the City of Stawell was abolished, and along with the Town of St Arnaud and parts of the Shires of Ararat, Avoca, Donald, Dunmunkle, Kara Kara, Stawell and the Grampians National Park section of the Shire of Wimmera, was merged into the newly created Shire of Northern Grampians.

=== Wards ===
The City of Stawell was at one stage divided into wards, but they were abolished on 27 January 1965, after which the twelve councillors represented the entire area.

== Population ==
Year	Population
1954	5,463
1958	5,810*
1961	5,506
1966	5,904
1971	5,800
1976	5,830
1981	6,160
1986	6,252
1991	6,339

* Estimate in the 1958 Victorian Year Book.

== See also ==
- List of mayors of Stawell
