= Jeruk =

- Town
- Coordinates: 36°01′04″S 143°24′30″E
- Country: Australia
- State: Victoria
- LGA: Shire of Buloke
- Location: 17 km (11 mi) NE of Wycheproof; 56 km (35 mi) SW of Kerang; 242 km (150 mi) NW of Melbourne

Government
  - State electorate: Mildura
  - Federal division: Mallee

Population
  - Total: 14 (2016 census)
- Postcode: 3527
Localities around Jeruk
Towaninny South	Ninyeunook	Barraport West
Bunguluke	Jeruk	Barraport West
Bunguluke	Bunguluke	Glenloth East

Jeruk is a located in the local government area of the Shire of Buloke, Victoria, Australia. The post office there opened on 10 August 1880, was closed on 2 September 1901, reopened in 1904 and closed on 31 May 1930.
