= List of acts of the Parliament of Victoria from 1907 =

This is a list of acts of the Parliament of Victoria, Australia for the year 1907.

== 1907 ==
Short title, or popular name	Citation	Royal assent
Long title
Constitution Act 1906 (Note: Although passed in the year 1906, and given a short title ending '...Act 1906', the need to obtain approval for this act from the United Kingdom meant it was not proclaimed until the year 1907.) (repealed)	6 Edw. VII. No. 2075	26 January 1907 (Note: This act was reserved for approval by His Majesty.)
An Act to abolish the Separate Representation in Parliament of Public Officers and Railways Officers. (Repealed by Constitution Act Amendment Act 1915 (6 Geo. V. No. 2632))
	7 Edw. VII. No. 2076	11 July 1907
An Act to apply out of the Consolidated Revenue the sum of One million and twenty-five thousand seven hundred and forty pounds to the service of the year One thousand nine hundred and seven and One thousand nine hundred and eight.
	7 Edw. VII. No. 2077	31 July 1907
An Act to apply out of the Consolidated Revenue the sum of One hundred and fifty-two thousand one hundred and two pounds to the service of the year One thousand nine hundred and six and One thousand nine hundred and seven.
Tocumwal Railway Extension Act 1907	7 Edw. VII. No. 2078	13 August 1907
An Act to authorize the Construction of an Extension of the Strathmerton towards Tocumwal Railway to Tocumwal in the State of New South Wales and to ratify an Agreement in reference thereto between the Governments of Victoria and New South Wales.
Companies Act 1907	7 Edw. VII. No. 2079	13 August 1907
An Act to further amend the Companies Acts.
Municipal Association Act 1907	7 Edw. VII. No. 2080	27 August 1907
An Act for the incorporation of an Association called the Municipal Association of Victoria.
Default Summonses Act 1907 (repealed)	7 Edw. VII. No. 2081	10 September 1907
An Act to provide for the payment of fees for the Service of certain Default Summonses. (Repealed by Justices Act 1915 (6 Geo. V. No. 2675))
	7 Edw. VII. No. 2082	12 September 1907
An Act to apply out of the Consolidated Revenue the sum of Four hundred and twenty-one thousand two hundred and sixty-four pounds to the service of the year One thousand nine hundred and seven and One thousand nine hundred and eight.
Vacant Unclaimed Lands Act 1907 (repealed)	7 Edw. VII. No. 2083	24 September 1907
An Act to amend the Vacant Unclaimed Lands Act 1906. (Note: Vacant Unclaimed Lands Act 1906 (6 Edw. VII. No. 2056)) (Repealed by Land Act 1915 (6 Geo. V. No. 2676))
Brim Registers Act 1907	7 Edw. VII. No. 2084	24 September 1907
An Act to validate certain Registers and Certificates of Births or Deaths at Brim. (Note: Brim, Victoria.)
Surplus Revenue Act 1907	7 Edw. VII. No. 2085	24 September 1907
An Act relating to the Surplus Revenue of the Financial Year ended on the thirtieth day of June One thousand nine hundred and seven.
Real Property Act 1907 (repealed)	7 Edw. VII. No. 2086	24 September 1907
An Act with respect to the Limitation of Actions relating to Real and other Property and for other purposes. (Repealed by Real Property Act 1915 (6 Geo. V. No. 2719))
Ancient Lights Declaratory Act 1907 (repealed)	7 Edw. VII. No. 2087	8 October 1907
An Act to declare the Law with respect to Ancient Lights. (Repealed by Real Property Act 1915 (6 Geo. V. No. 2719))
Old-age Pensions Act 1907	7 Edw. VII. No. 2088	8 October 1907
An Act to increase the Maximum Rate of Old-age Pensions.
Administration and Probate Duties Act 1907 (repealed)	7 Edw. VII. No. 2089	8 October 1907
An Act relating to Duties payable under the Administration and Probate Acts. (Repealed by Administration and Probate Act 1915 (6 Geo. V. No. 2611))
Income Tax Act 1907 (repealed)	7 Edw. VII. No. 2090	8 October 1907
An Act to declare the Rates of Income Tax for the Year ending on the thirty-first day of December One thousand nine hundred and eight and to continue the Income Tax Acts. (Repealed by Income Tax Act 1915 (6 Geo. V. No. 2668))
	7 Edw. VII. No. 2091	11 October 1907
An Act to apply out of the Consolidated Revenue the sum of Seven hundred and eighty-eight thousand seven hundred and eighty-two pounds to the service of the year One thousand nine hundred and seven and One thousand nine hundred and eight.
Marine Stores and Old Metals Act 1907 (repealed)	7 Edw. VII. No. 2092	22 October 1907
An Act to amend the Marine Stores and Old Metals Act 1890. (Note: Marine Stores and Old Metals Act 1890 (54 Vict. No. 1114)) (Repealed by Marine Stores and Old Metals Act 1915 (6 Geo. V. No. 2689))
Police Offences Act 1907 (repealed)	7 Edw. VII. No. 2093	22 October 1907
An Act to amend the Police Offences Acts. (Repealed by Police Offences Act 1912 (3 Geo. V. No. 2422))
Transfer of Land Act 1907 (repealed)	7 Edw. VII. No. 2094	6 November 1907
An Act relating to Attesting Documents under the Transfer of Land Act 1890. (Note: Transfer of Land Act 1890 (54 Vict. No. 1149)) (Repealed by Transfer of Land Act 1915 (6 Geo. V. No. 2740))
Forests Act 1907 (repealed)	7 Edw. VII. No. 2095	6 November 1907
An Act to provide for the Management and Protection of State Forests. (Repealed by Forests Act 1915 (6 Geo. V. No. 2655))
Collins-street Independent Church Lands Act 1907	7 Edw. VII. No. 2096	6 November 1907
An Act to define the Trusts and Powers affecting certain Lands held in trust for The Collins-street Independent Church.
Dandenong Lands Act 1907	7 Edw. VII. No. 2097	18 November 1907
An Act to amend the Dandenong Lands Act 1892 (Note: Dandenong Lands Act 1892 (56 Vict. No. 1267)) and for other purposes.
Mandurang Lands Act 1907	7 Edw. VII. No. 2098	18 November 1907
An Act to provide for the Resumption by the Crown of certain Land in the Parish of Mandurang.
	7 Edw. VII. No. 2099	18 November 1907
An Act to alter the Hour of Closing at Polling for Legislative Council Elections.
Roman Catholic Trusts Act 1907	7 Edw. VII. No. 2100	18 November 1907
An Act to provide for the Creation of Corporate Bodies of Trustees in which Property belonging to the Roman Catholic Church in Victoria may be vested and for other purposes.
Sherwood Lands Act 1907	7 Edw. VII. No. 2101	18 November 1907
An Act to revoke the Permanent Reservation of certain Lands in the Parish of Sherwood as Sites for Military and other public purposes.
Infant Life Protection Act 1907 (repealed)	7 Edw. VII. No. 2102	18 November 1907
An Act to amend the Infant Life Protection Act 1890. (Note: Infant Life Protection Act 1890 (54 Vict. No. 1198)) (Repealed by Infant Life Protection Act 1915 (6 Geo. V. No. 2670))
Licensing Act 1907 (repealed)	7 Edw. VII. No. 2103	29 November 1907
An Act to amend the Licensing Acts and for other purposes. (Repealed by Licensing Act 1915 (6 Geo. V. No. 2683))
Alexandra Railway Construction Act 1907	7 Edw. VII. No. 2104	3 December 1907
An Act to authorize the Construction by the State of a Line of Railway from Alexandra-road to Alexandra Township.
Justices Act 1907 (repealed)	7 Edw. VII. No. 2105	3 December 1907
An Act relating to Applications for Orders to Review Decisions of Courts of Petty Sessions or Justices. (Repealed by Justices Act 1915 (6 Geo. V. No. 2675))
Indeterminate Sentences Act 1907 (repealed)	7 Edw. VII. No. 2106	3 December 1907
An Act to provide for Indeterminate Sentences and for the Detention and Control of Habitual and other Criminals. (Repealed by Crimes Act 1915 (6 Geo. V. No. 2637))
Friendly Societies Act 1907 (repealed)	7 Edw. VII. No. 2107	3 December 1907
An Act to further amend the Friendly Societies Acts. (Repealed by Friendly Societies Act 1915 (6 Geo. V. No. 2656))
	7 Edw. VII. No. 2108	10 December 1907
An Act to apply a sum out of the Consolidated Revenue to the service of the year ending on the thirtieth day of June One thousand nine hundred and eight and to appropriate the Supplies granted in this Session of Parliament.
Geelong Municipal Waterworks Act 1907 (repealed)	7 Edw. VII. No. 2109	16 December 1907
An Act to provide for the Constitution of a Municipal Waterworks Trust for the Supply of Water to Geelong and District and for other purposes. (Repealed by Geelong Waterworks and Sewerage Act 1915 (6 Geo. V. No. 2661))
Money Lenders Act 1907 (repealed)	7 Edw. VII. No. 2110	16 December 1907
An Act to amend the Money Lenders Act 1906. (Note: Money Lenders Act 1906 (6 Edw. VII. No. 2061)) (Repealed by Money Lenders Act 1915 (6 Geo. V. No. 2701))
Chief Engineer For Railway Construction Act 1907 (repealed)	7 Edw. VII. No. 2111	16 December 1907
An Act to alter the style or title of the Engineer-in-Chief or Acting Engineer-in-Chief of Victorian Railways to that of Chief Engineer for Railway Construction. (Repealed by Railway Lands Acquisition Act 1915 (6 Geo. V. No. 2715))
Studley Park Bridge Land Act 1907	7 Edw. VII. No. 2112	16 December 1907
An Act to authorize the re-vesting in the Crown of certain Land granted to Trustees as and for a Road and Approaches to Studley Park Bridge and as and for a Site for a Toll House and Out Offices in connexion with such Bridge the Cancellation of the Crown Grant and for other purposes.
	7 Edw. VII. No. 2113	16 December 1907
An Act to further continue the Voting by Post Acts. (Repealed by Constitution Act Amendment Act 1915 (6 Geo. V. No. 2632))
Mallee Leases Act 1907 (repealed)	7 Edw. VII. No. 2114	16 December 1907
An Act to further extend the Term of certain Mallee Allotment Leases. (Repealed by Land Act 1915 (6 Geo. V. No. 2676))
Consolidated Revenue Application Act 1907	7 Edw. VII. No. 2115	16 December 1907
An Act to authorize the Treasurer to pay to the Commissioners of Savings Banks and the Trust Funds Trustees certain moneys not later than the last day of July One thousand nine hundred and eight.
Victorian Railway Loan Act 1907	7 Edw. VII. No. 2116	16 December 1907
An Act to authorize the raising of Money for Railways and other purposes.
Railway Loan Application Act 1907	7 Edw. VII. No. 2117	16 December 1907
An Act to sanction the issue and application of certain sums of Money available under Loan Acts for Railways.
Water Supply Loans Application Act 1907	7 Edw. VII. No. 2118	16 December 1907
An Act to sanction the issue and application of certain Sums of Money available under Loan Acts for Water Supply in Country Districts and for other purposes.
Railways Act 1907 (repealed)	7 Edw. VII. No. 2119	16 December 1907
An Act to further amend the Laws relating to the Victorian Railways. (Repealed by Railway Lands Acquisition Act 1915 (6 Geo. V. No. 2715))
Administration and Probate Act 1907 (repealed)	7 Edw. VII. No. 2120	16 December 1907
An Act to further amend the Administration and Probate Act 1890 (Note: Administration and Probate Act 1890 (54 Vict. No. 1060)) and for other purposes. (Repealed by Administration and Probate Act 1915 (6 Geo. V. No. 2611))
Land Draining Facilities Act 1907	7 Edw. VII. No. 2121	16 December 1907
An Act to empower Municipal Councils to scour cleanse and keep open certain Drains constructed by Owners of Lands.
Old Colonists Association Act 1907 (repealed)	7 Edw. VII. No. 2122	16 December 1907
An Act to vest in "The Old Colonists Association" Land situated in the City of Fitzroy whereof the "Australasian Dramatic and Musical Association" is the Crown Grantee in pursuance of an Agreement between the said Associations and for other purposes. (Repealed by Statute Law Revision Act 1984 (No. 10087))
Murray Settlements Act 1907 (repealed)	7 Edw. VII. No. 2123	16 December 1907
An Act to provide for Settlement on certain Crown Lands situate in the Mallee Border and the Mallee Country and near the Murray River and for other purposes. (Repealed by Land Act 1915 (6 Geo. V. No. 2676))
Rupanyup and Marnoo Railway Construction Act 1907	7 Edw. VII. No. 2124	23 December 1907
An Act to authorize the Construction by the State of a Line of Railway from Rupanyup to Marnoo.
Nyora and Woolamai Railway Construction Act 1907	7 Edw. VII. No. 2125	23 December 1907
An Act to authorize the Construction by the State of a Line of Railway from Nyora to Woolamai.
Health Act 1907 (repealed)	7 Edw. VII. No. 2126	23 December 1907
An Act to further amend the Health Acts. (Repealed by Health Act 1915 (6 Geo. V. No. 2665))
Mines Act 1907 (repealed)	7 Edw. VII. No. 2127	23 December 1907
An Act to further amend the Mines Acts. (Repealed by Mines Act 1915 (6 Geo. V. No. 2698))
Closer Settlement Act 1907 (repealed)	7 Edw. VII. No. 2128	23 December 1907
An Act to further amend the Closer Settlement Act 1904. (Note: Closer Settlement Act 1904 (4 Edw. VII. No. 1962)) (Repealed by Closer Settlement Act 1915 (6 Geo. V. No. 2629))
Municipal Endowment Act 1907	7 Edw. VII. No. 2129	23 December 1907
An Act relating to Municipal Endowment and the Reclassification of Shires and Boroughs.
Prahran and Malvern Tramways Trust Act 1907	7 Edw. VII. No. 2130	23 December 1907
An Act for the Confirmation of an Agreement between the City of Prahran and the Town of Malvern and for the Constitution of the Prahran and Malvern Tramways Trust.
Railways Standing Committee Act 1907 (repealed)	7 Edw. VII. No. 2131	23 December 1907
An Act to amend the Railways Standing Committee Acts. (Repealed by Railways Standing Committee Act 1915 (6 Geo. V. No. 2717))
Terang Land Act 1907	7 Edw. VII. No. 2132	23 December 1907
An Act to revoke the Permanent Reservation of portion of certain Land reserved as a Site or Public Purposes at Terang.
Railway Funds Act 1907	7 Edw. VII. No. 2133	23 December 1907
An Act to establish Two Permanent Railway Reserve Funds.
Drainage of Land Act 1907 (repealed)	7 Edw. VII. No. 2134	23 December 1907
An Act to amend the Drainage of Land Act 1890. (Note: Drainage of Land Act 1890 (54 Vict. No. 1085)) (Repealed by Drainage of Land Act 1915 (6 Geo. V. No. 2643))
Municipalities' Powers Extension Act 1907 (repealed)	7 Edw. VII. No. 2135	23 December 1907
An Act to empower Municipal Councils to provide and maintain Sheep Dips and to contribute towards Public Agricultural and other Schools and Colleges. (Repealed by Local Government Act 1915 (6 Geo. V. No. 2686))
Tolmie Railway Act 1907 (repealed)	7 Edw. VII. No. 2136	23 December 1907
An Act to authorize the Construction by the State of Railways for developing Settlement in the Tolmie District and for other purposes. (Repealed by Transport Act 1983 (No. 9921))
Factories and Shops Act 1907 (repealed)	7 Edw. VII. No. 2137	23 December 1907
An Act to amend the Factories and Shops Acts. (Repealed by Factories and Shops Act 1912 (3 Geo. V. No. 2386))
Gold Buyers Act 1907 (repealed)	7 Edw. VII. No. 2138	23 December 1907
An Act to amend the Law relating to Gold Buyers. (Repealed by Gold Buyers Act 1915 (6 Geo. V. No. 2662))

== Sources ==
- "1907 Victorian Historical Acts". AustLII.
