= Marmal =

Marmal may refer to:

- Lake Marmal, a locality in the local government area of the Shire of Buloke and Shire of Loddon, Victoria, Australia
- Camp Marmal, the largest base of the Bundeswehr outside of Germany, in Mazar-i-Sharif, Afghanistan
