= Richmond Plains =

- Town
- Coordinates: 36°23′49″S 143°28′31″E
- Country: Australia
- State: Victoria
- LGAs: Shire of Loddon; Shire of Buloke

Government
  - State electorate: Ripon
  - Federal division: Mallee

Population
  - Total: 9 (2021 census)
- Postcode: 3518

Richmond Plains is a locality in the Shire of Loddon and the Shire of Buloke, Victoria, Australia. At the 2021 census, Richmond Plains had a population of 9.

== History ==
Richmond Plains is located on the lands of the Dja Dja Wurrung people.

On 18 December 1934, a cyclone struck Richmond Plains, causing considerable damage to the local state school.
