= List of places on the Victorian Heritage Register in the Shire of Buloke =

This is a list of places on the Victorian Heritage Register in the Shire of Buloke in Victoria, Australia. The Victorian Heritage Register is maintained by the Heritage Council of Victoria.

The Victorian Heritage Register, as of 2021, lists the following four state-registered places within the Shire of Buloke:

Place name	Place #	Location	Suburb or Town	Co-ordinates	Built	State registered	Photo
Georgie's Hut (Chinese Market Garden)	H0873	Jeffcott Road	Donald	36.357841°S 142.999178°E	c. 1927-28	11 October 2007	
Taggerty Buffet Car	H2318	34-40 Hammill Street	Donald	36.366624°S 142.985512°E	1910	13 February 2014	
Wycheproof Court House	H1656	38 High Street	Wycheproof	36.076850°S 143.227450°E	1889	20 August 1982	
Wycheproof railway station	H1601	Railway Place	Wycheproof	36.082080°S 143.228240°E	1887	20 August 1982	
