= Woosang =

- Town
- Coordinates: 36°19′37″S 143°28′23″E
- Country: Australia
- State: Victoria
- LGAs: Shire of Buloke; Shire of Loddon

Government
  - State electorate: Ripon
  - Federal division: Mallee

Population
  - Total: 12 (2021 census)
- Postcode: 3518

Woosang is a locality in the Shire of Loddon and the Shire of Buloke, Victoria, Australia. At the 2021 census, Woosang had a population of 12.

== History ==
Woosang is located on the lands of the Dja Dja Wurrung people.
