= Town of St Arnaud =

Coordinates: 36°36′S 143°15′E

- Local government area
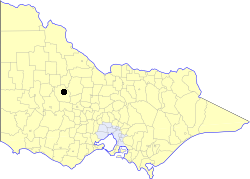
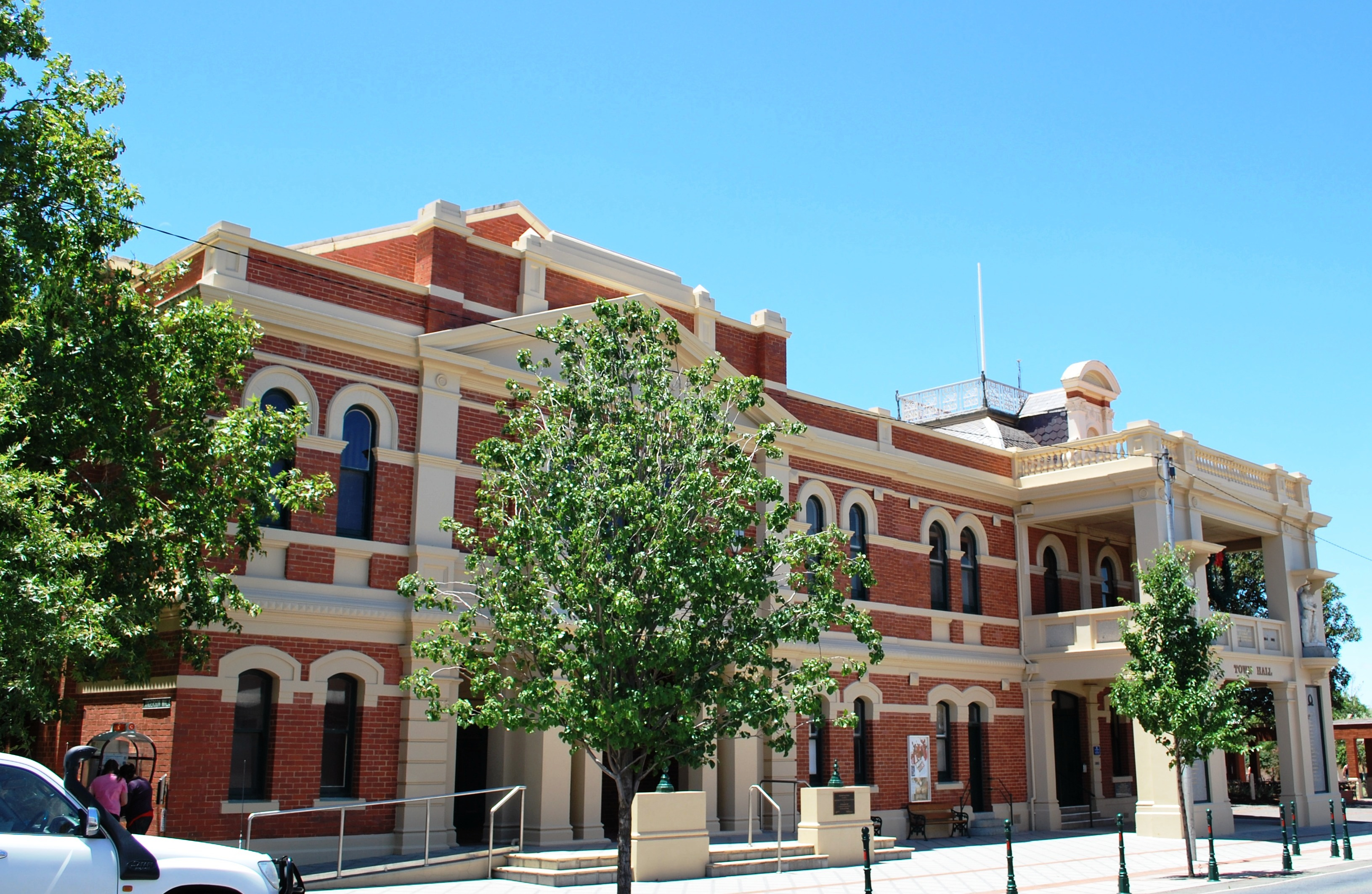
- Location in Victoria Town Hall
- The Town of St Arnaud as at its dissolution in 1995
- Country: Australia
- State: Victoria
- Region: Wimmera
- Established: 1861
- Council seat: St Arnaud

Area
  - Total: 25.92 km^{2} (10.01 sq mi)

Population
  - Total(s): 2,910 (1992)
  - Density: 112.27/km^{2} (290.8/sq mi)
- County: Kara Kara

The Town of St Arnaud was a local government area about 240 kilometres (149 mi) northwest of Melbourne, the state capital of Victoria, Australia. The town covered an area of 25.92 square kilometres (10.0 sq mi), and existed from 1861 until 1994. Its area was surrounded by the Shire of Kara Kara.

== History ==
St Arnaud was first incorporated as a municipal district on 16 August 1861. It became a borough on 1 October 1863, and a town on 17 October 1950.

On 20 January 1995, the Town of St Arnaud was abolished, and along with the City of Stawell and parts of the Shires of Ararat, Avoca, Donald, Dunmunkle, Kara Kara, Stawell and the Grampians National Park section of the Shire of Wimmera, was merged into the newly created Shire of Northern Grampians.

=== Wards ===
The Town of St Arnaud was not subdivided into wards, and the nine councillors represented the entire area.

== Population ==
Year	Population
1954	3,037
1958	3,170*
1961	3,150
1966	3,003
1971	2,779
1976	2,786
1981	2,721
1986	2,692
1991	2,741

* Estimate in the 1958 Victorian Year Book.
