= Shire of Stawell =

Coordinates: 37°03′S 142°46′E

- Local government area
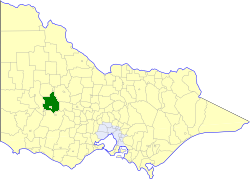
- Location in Victoria

- The Shire of Stawell as at its dissolution in 1995
- Country: Australia
- State: Victoria
- Region: Grampians
- Established: 1861
- Council seat: Stawell

Area
  - Total: 2,606 km^{2} (1,006 sq mi)

Population
  - Total: 2,620 (1992)
  - Density: 1.0054/km^{2} (2.604/sq mi)
- County: Borung, Kara Kara
LGAs around Shire of Stawell
Dunmunkle	Dunmunkle	Kara Kara
Wimmera	Shire of Stawell	Kara Kara
Dundas	Ararat	Avoca

The Shire of Stawell was a local government area about 230 kilometres (143 mi) west-northwest of Melbourne, the state capital of Victoria, Australia. The shire covered an area of 2,606 square kilometres (1,006.2 sq mi), and existed from 1861 until 1995.

Stawell itself was managed by a separate entity, the City of Stawell.

== History ==
Stawell was first incorporated as a road district on 29 January 1861, and became a shire on 30 December 1864. On 26 October 1926, it annexed part of the North Riding of the Shire of Ararat.

On 20 January 1995, the Shire of Stawell was abolished, and along with the City of Stawell, the Town of St Arnaud, parts of the Shires of Ararat, Avoca, Donald, Kara Kara, Dunmunkle and the Grampians National Park section of the Shire of Wimmera, was merged into the newly created Shire of Northern Grampians. The Armstrong district was transferred into the Rural City of Ararat.

== Wards ==
The Shire of Stawell was divided into four ridings, each of which elected three councillors:

- North Riding
- East Riding
- West Riding
- North-East Riding

== Towns and localities ==
- Armstrong
- Bellfield
- Callawadda
- Campbells Bridge
- Deep Lead
- Concongella
- Glenorchy
- Great Western
- Greens Creek
- Halls Gap
- Illawarra
- Kanya
- Lake Fyans
- Landsborough
- Ledcourt
- Marnoo
- Wallaloo

== Population ==
Year	Population
1954	2,286
1958	2,370*
1961	2,193
1966	2,355
1971	2,034
1976	2,050#
1981	2,375
1986	2,552
1991	2,754

* Estimate in the 1958 Victorian Year Book.
# 1981 census says 2,306 for 1976.

== See also ==
- List of mayors of Stawell
