= Glenloth East =

- Town
- Coordinates: 36°03′33″S 143°27′26″E
- Country: Australia
- State: Victoria
- LGA: Shire of Buloke
- Location: 236 km (147 mi) NW of Melbourne; 80 km (50 mi) S of Swan Hill; 20 km (12 mi) E of Wycheproof

Government
  - State electorate: Mildura
  - Federal division: Mallee

Population
  - Total: 13 (2016 census)
- Postcode: 3527
Localities around Glenloth East
Jeruk	Jeruk	Barraport West
Bunguluke	Glenloth East	Barraport West
Nareewillock	Nareewillock	Lake Marmal

Glenloth East is a locality in the Shire of Buloke and the Shire of Loddon, Victoria, Australia.
