= Alex Martinez (graffiti artist) =

United States-born international artist

Shine
- Born: Alexander Martinez; United States
- Movement: Street art
- Relatives: Adalberto Martínez Chávez
- Website: Alex Martinez on Instagram

Alex Martinez (also known by his Tag name SHINE) is a United States-born international artist who specializes in graffiti art. He has worked as an illustrator and muralist in Greece and the UK. His uncle is the Mexican actor/dancer Adalberto Martinez.

== Career ==
Martinez is best known for his UK work in and around London's Notting Hill where he maintains a studio. Martinez was commissioned by Madame Tussauds for the Tupac Shakur exhibition, in which he exhibited both Wildstyle and signature spray can techniques. He attended the Meeting of Styles graffiti event in 2008. Martinez has created community murals in W11. He curated the first two mobile graffiti exhibitions (Canvas and found Ply-board works) for the Portobello Film Festival. His mural of Samuel Beckett, on Blenheim Crescent in London, has been used for book jackets and postcards. Martinez spends much of his time working abroad. Martinez has written on graffiti and street art under the pen name SHINE.

== See also ==
- List of Street Artists
- List of Greek Americans
- List of Mexican Americans
