= List of mayors of Stawell =

This is a list of the mayors of the Shire of Stawell, a former local government area in Victoria, Australia.

== Mayors (Borough) (1870–1994) ==
Mayors	Term
Ronald Carmichael Campbell	1870
Benjamin S. Dawson	1872
Mr. Rickards	1873
G. C. Purcell	1873–74
Alexander Brown	1875–78
Thomas Young Smith	1879
W. Thompson	
Thomas Gilbert Crerar	1886
Charles Alfred Akins	1889
William John McMullin	1897–98
William Whiteside	1900
Gustav Mahnke	1904–07
George Barnes	1910–11
J. Paton	1922
Dave Mitchell	1928
Mr. Brown	1930
S. P. Freeland	1935–36
A. Oliver	1936-37
Mr Bull	1937-38
M.J. Cowman	1938
A. Waterfield	1949
T. Gray	1952

== Mayors (Northern Grampians) (1995–2011) ==
Mayors	Term	
Dela hunting	Don Gardiner	1997
Kevin Erwin	2008–10	
Ray Hewitt	2010–11	

== See also ==
- City of Stawell
- Shire of Stawell
