= Richardson River (Victoria) =

Richardson
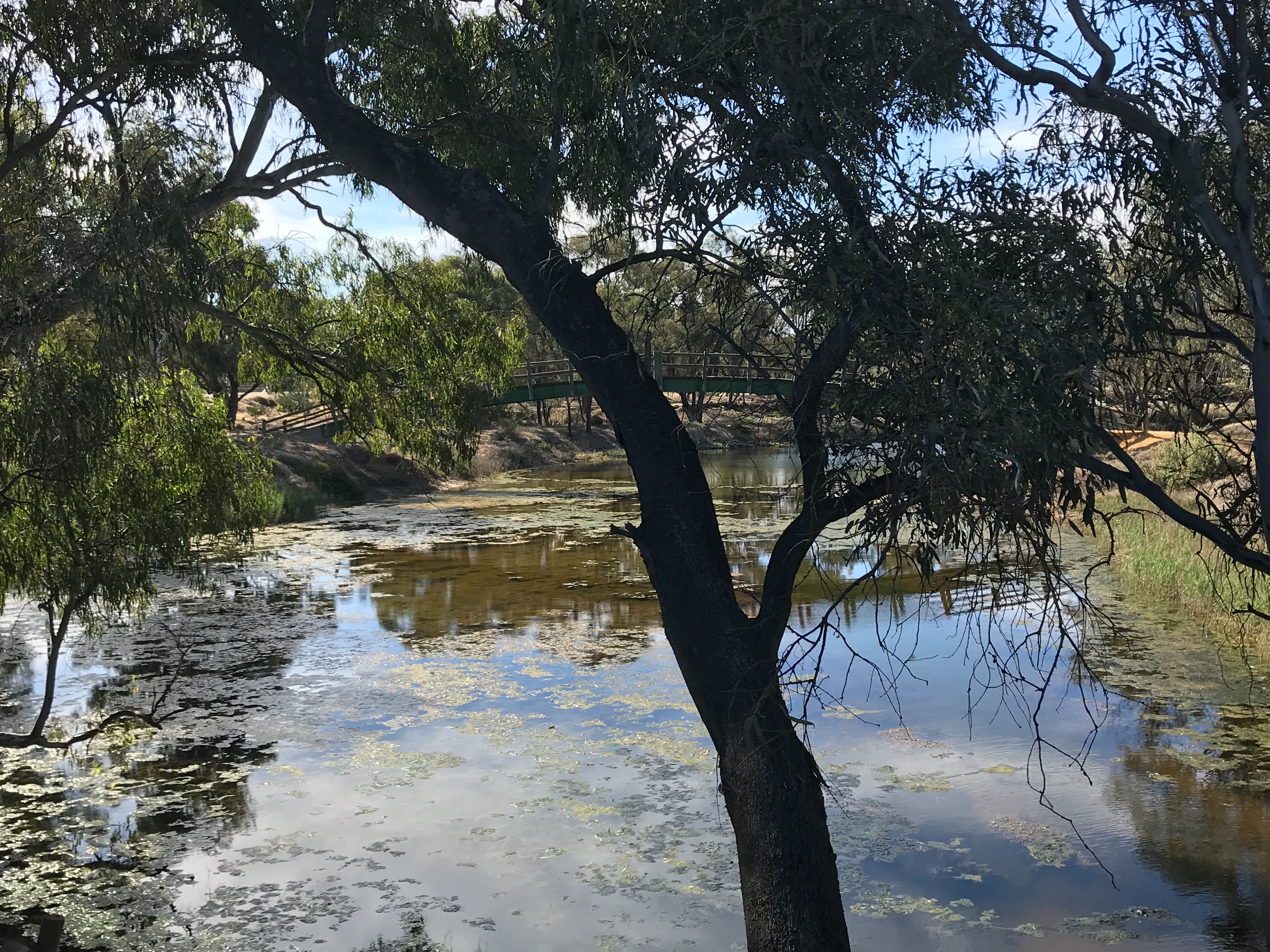
- Richardson River at Donald, December 2018

- Location of the Richardson River mouth in Victoria
- Native name: Larning; Witjibar; Wallamyer; Barnunung; Kurakibiyal (Djadjawurrung); Larning; Witjibar; Wallamyer; Barnunung; Willaring (Wemba Wemba); Barnunung (Wergaia); Wirchilleba

Location
- Country: Australia
- State: Victoria
- Region: Murray Darling Depression (IBRA), Wimmera
- Local government area: Northern Grampians
- Towns: Donald

Physical characteristics
- Source: Great Dividing Range
  - location: Mori Mori Nature Conservation Reserve
  - coordinates: 36°50′9.8″S 142°59′40″E
  - elevation: 295 m (968 ft)
- Mouth: Lake Buloke
  - location: north of Donald
  - coordinates: 36°18′25.8″S 142°56′54.4″E
  - elevation: 107 m (351 ft)
- Length: 119 km (74 mi)

Basin features
- River system: Wimmera catchment
- Tributaries
  - right: Wallaloo Creek, Avon River (Grampians)

The Richardson River, an inland intermittent river of the Wimmera catchment, in the Grampians and Wimmera regions of the Australian state of Victoria. Rising on the northern slopes of the Great Dividing Range, the Richardson River flows generally north and drains into Lake Buloke, one of a series of ephemeral lakes that, whilst they do not directly empty into a defined watercourse, form part of the Murray River catchment of the Murray-Darling basin.

== Location and features ==
The Richardson River rises on the northern slopes of the Great Dividing Range in the Mori Mori Nature Conservation Reserve. The river flows in a highly meandering course generally west by north and then east by north, joined by two tributaries including the Avon River, before reaching its mouth in Lake Buloke; north of Donald. The Richardson River descends 187 metres (614 ft) over its 119-kilometre (74 mi) course.

== Etymology ==
The river is named after John Matthew Richardson who fell from his horse during Thomas Mitchell's 1836 expedition.

In the Aboriginal Djadjawurrung and Jardwadjali languages, the river is named Larning, meaning "your camp"; Witjibar, meaning "basket grass river"; and Wallamyer with no defined meaning. In the Djadjawurrung, Jardwadjali, and Wergaia languages, the river is named Barnunung, meaning "smouldering away". In the Djadjawurrung language, the river is named Kurakibiyal with kurak meaning "sand"" and biyal meaning "red gum". In the Jardwadjali language, the river is named Willaring, with wille meaning a "common silver grey possum". In an unspecified Aboriginal language, the river is called Wirchilleba meaning "a dry watercourse".

== See also ==
- List of rivers of Victoria
