= Lake Buloke =

Lake in Australia

Lake Buloke (Banyenong)
- Location in Victoria
- Location: Wimmera, Victoria
- Coordinates: 36°19′26.5″S 142°55′54.5″E
- Type: Eutrophic
- Primary inflows: Richardson River
- Primary outflows: Evaporation
- Basin countries: Australia
- Surface area: 4,300 ha (11,000 acres)

Lake Buloke is a eutrophic lake in the Wimmera region of north-western Victoria, Australia. The lake is fed by the Richardson River and is located adjacent to the township of Donald. Lake Buloke is also one of the most popular duck shooting lakes in Victoria. The Lake Buloke area comprises wetland habitat of high significance for waterbirds, particularly waterfowl and waders. The bull oak casuarina is found in the Shire and around Lake Buloke.

In the Aboriginal Jardwadjali language, the river is named Banyenong, with banye meaning the "burning of roots and stumps" and nong meaning "the past", and also Buluk, meaning "lake". In the 1870s, the lake was known as Lake Banyenong, as buloke was a word meaning lake.

The Shire of Buloke derives its name from the lake.

== See also ==
- Lakes and other water bodies of Victoria
