= Dooboobetic =

- Town
- Coordinates: 36°22′S 143°12′E
- Country: Australia
- State: Victoria
- LGA: Shire of Buloke
- Location: 276 km (171 mi) from Melbourne; 19 km (12 mi) from Donald; 27 km (17 mi) from Charlton; 134 km (83 mi) from Bendigo

Population
  - Total: 9 (2016 census)
- Postcode: 3478

Dooboobetic is a locality in Victoria, Australia, located approximately 19 km east of Donald. It was the site of McAuley College, a Roman Catholic secondary school, from 1986 to 2003.
