= Avon River (Grampians, Victoria) =

River in Victoria, Australia

Avon
- Location of the Avon River mouth in Victoria
- Native name: Wityellibar (Wathawurrung); Kurakibiyal (Djadjawurrung)

Location
- Country: Australia
- State: Victoria
- Region: Murray Darling Depression (IBRA), Wimmera
- Local government area: Northern Grampians

Physical characteristics
- Source: Great Dividing Range
- Source confluence: Avon Creek and Sandy Creek
  - location: Beazleys Bridge; west of St Arnaud
  - coordinates: 36°41′59.9″S 143°10′2.9″E
  - elevation: 195 m (640 ft)
- Mouth: confluence with the Richardson River
  - location: Banyena; northwest of Marnoo
  - coordinates: 36°34′16″S 142°49′33″E
  - elevation: 133 m (436 ft)
- Length: 64 km (40 mi)

Basin features
- River system: Wimmera catchment
- Tributaries
  - left: Faulkner Creek

The Avon River, an inland intermittent river of the Wimmera catchment, in the Grampians and Wimmera regions of the Australian state of Victoria. Rising on the northern slopes of the Great Dividing Range, the Avon River flows north-westerly to reach its confluence with the Richardson River. The rivers of the Wimmera catchment drain into a series of ephemeral lakes that, whilst they do not directly empty into a defined watercourse, form part of the Murray River catchment of the Murray-Darling basin.

== Location and features ==
The Avon River rises on the northern slopes of the Great Dividing Range, near Beazleys Bridge, west of St Arnaud. The rivers flows in a highly meandering course generally west by north, joined by one minor tributary, before reaching its mouth to flow into the Richardson River at Banyena; northwest of Marnoo. The Avon River descends 62 metres (203 ft) over its 64-kilometre (40 mi) course.

== Etymology ==
In a western Kulin Aboriginal language the river and surrounding country is named Wityellibar, from witji "basket grass" bar "river"; and in the Djadjawurrung language, Kurakibiyal, with kurak meaning "sand" and biyal, meaning "red gum".

== See also ==
- List of rivers of Victoria
