= Warmur =

- Town
- Coordinates: 36°04′58″S 142°45′50″E
- Country: Australia
- State: Victoria
- LGA: Shire of Buloke
- Location: 274 km (170 mi) NW of Melbourne; 109 km (68 mi) SW of Swan Hill; 37 km (23 mi) NE of Warracknabeal

Government
  - State electorate: Mildura
  - Federal division: Mallee

Population
  - Total: 31 (SAL 2021)
- Postcode: 3482
Localities around Warmur
Wilkur	Ballapur	Birchip West
Wilkur	Warmur	Morton Plains
Wilkur	Watchem West	Watchem

Warmur is a locality in the local government area of the Shire of Buloke, Victoria, Australia. There is a rural CFA station in Warmur. The post office there opened as Warmur West State School on 1 July 1905, renamed to Warmur West in 1907 and was closed in 1930.
