= Shire of Donald =

Coordinates: 36°22′S 142°59′E

- Local government area
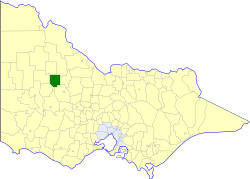
- Location in Victoria
- The Shire of Donald as at its dissolution in 1995
- Country: Australia
- State: Victoria
- Region: Mallee
- Established: 1861
- Council seat: Donald

Area
  - Total: 1,448 km^{2} (559 sq mi)

Population
  - Total: 2,540 (1992)
  - Density: 1.754/km^{2} (4.543/sq mi)
- County: Borung, Kara Kara
LGAs around Shire of Donald
Birchip	Birchip	Wycheproof
Warracknabeal	Shire of Donald	Charlton
Dunmunkle	Kara Kara	Kara Kara

The Shire of Donald was a local government area about 140 kilometres (87 mi) west-northwest of Bendigo, in western Victoria, Australia. The shire covered an area of 1,448 square kilometres (559.1 sq mi), and existed from 1861 until 1995.

== History ==
Donald was originally incorporated as the St Arnaud Road District on 25 June 1861, which became a shire on 22 November 1864. It was originally home to several other districts, which split away prior to 1900:

- 20 October 1884 - the East Riding became the Shire of Kara Kara;
- 30 January 1891 - the West Riding became the Shire of Borung, which later became the Shire of Warracknabeal;
- 27 April 1894 - the North Riding became the Shire of Wycheproof;
- 5 April 1895 - parts of the Central Riding became the Shire of Birchip;
- 31 May 1895 - parts of the South Riding joined with parts of other shires, to become the Shire of Charlton.

On 11 February 1897, it was officially renamed to the Shire of Donald, after the largest town which remained. It annexed territory from the Shire of Dunmunkle on 26 May 1916, and from the Shire of Kara Kara on 27 April 1920.

On 20 January 1995, the Shire of Donald was abolished, and along with the Shires of Birchip, Charlton and Wycheproof, and parts of the Shire of Kara Kara, was merged into the newly created Shire of Buloke.

== Wards ==
The Shire of Donald was divided into three wards, each of which elected three councillors:

- South Ward
- East Ward
- West Ward

== Towns and localities ==
- Banyenong
- Buloke
- Carron
- Chirrip
- Corack
- Corack East
- Donald*
- Laen East
- Laen North
- Lake Buloke
- Litchfield
- Massey
- Mount Jeffcott
- Watchem

* Council seat.

== Population ==
Year	Population
1954	2,864
1958	3,060*
1961	2,921
1966	2,948
1971	2,639
1976	2,724
1981	2,597
1986	2,357
1991	2,385

* Estimate in the 1958 Victorian Year Book.
