= Morton Plains =

- Town
- Coordinates: 36°04′44″S 142°53′01″E
- Country: Australia
- State: Victoria
- LGA: Shire of Buloke
- Location: 267 km (166 mi) NW of Melbourne; 102 km (63 mi) SW of Swan Hill; 30 km (19 mi) W of Wycheproof

Government
  - State electorate: Mildura
  - Federal division: Mallee

Population
  - Total: 9 (2016 census)
- Postcode: 3482
Localities around Morton Plains
Birchip West	Birchip	Narraport
Warmur	Morton Plains	Thalia
Warmur	Watchem	Corack

Morton Plains is a locality in the local government area of the Shire of Buloke, Victoria, Australia. A post office opened on 1 August 1864 and was closed on 9 May 1931.
