= Birchip West =

- Town
- Coordinates: 36°00′45″S 142°49′43″E
- Country: Australia
- State: Victoria
- LGA: Shire of Buloke
- Location: 276 km (171 mi) NW of Melbourne; 99 km (62 mi) SW of Swan Hill; 8 km (5.0 mi) SW of Birchip

Government
  - State electorate: Mildura
  - Federal division: Mallee

Population
  - Total: 3 (2016 census)
- Postcode: 3483
Localities around Birchip West
| Ballapur | Karyrie | Birchip |
| Ballapur | Birchip West | Birchip |
| Warmur | Warmur | Morton Plains |

Birchip West is a locality in the Shire of Buloke, Victoria, Australia.
