= Yeungroon =

- Town
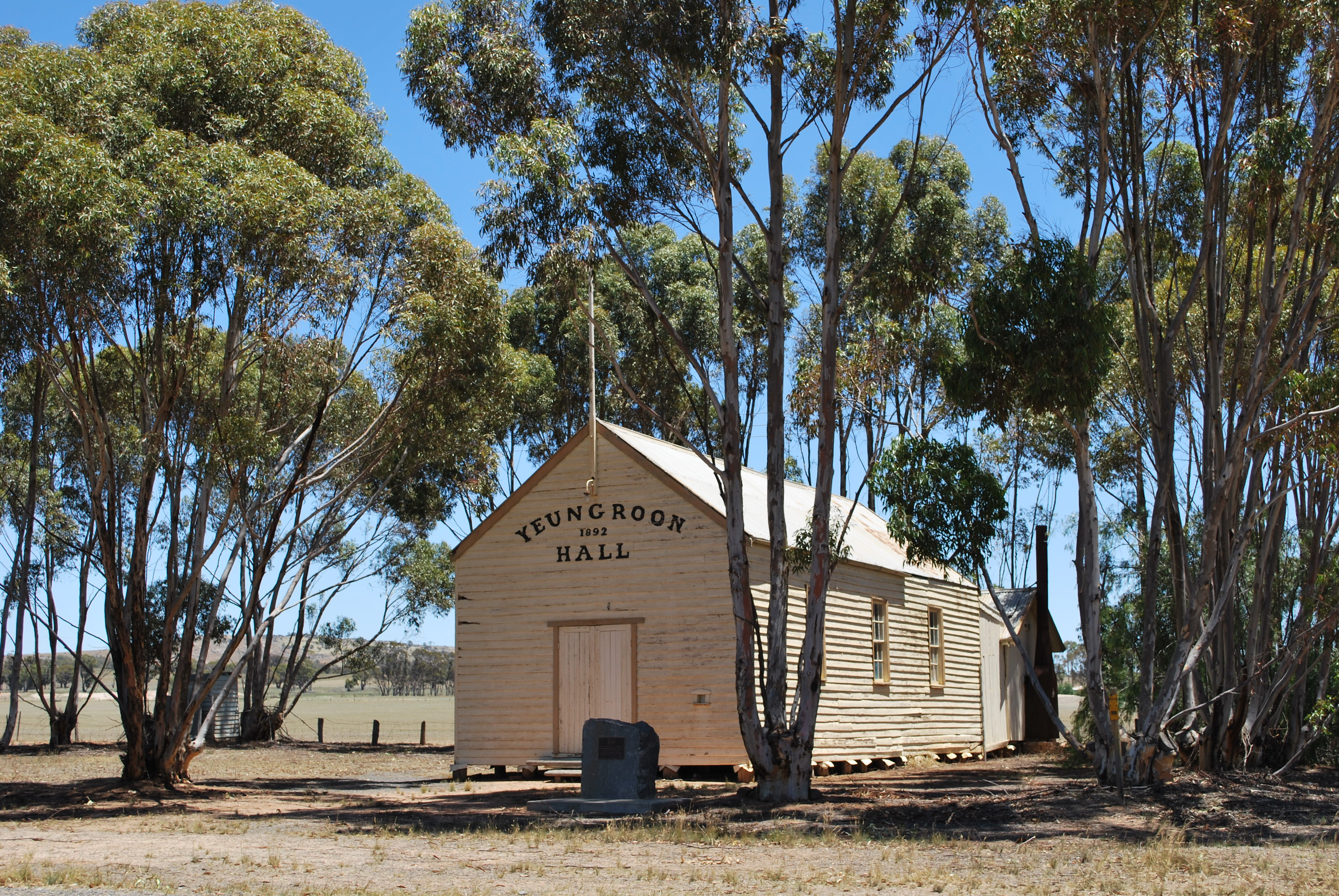
- Public hall, Yeungroon

- Coordinates: 36°23′S 143°17′E
- Country: Australia
- State: Victoria
- LGA: Shire of Buloke
- Location: 253 km (157 mi) NW of Melbourne; 124 km (77 mi) WNW of Bendigo; 14 km (8.7 mi) S of Charlton

Government
  - State electorate: Ripon
  - Federal division: Mallee

Population
  - Total: 34 (2021 census)
- Postcode: 3525

Yeungroon is a locality in north central Victoria, Australia. The locality is in the Shire of Buloke, on the Avoca River, 253 kilometres (157 mi) north west of the state capital, Melbourne.

At the 2021 census, Yeungroon had a population of 34.
