= Nareewillock =

Nareewillock Victoria
- Coordinates: 36°09′31″S 143°26′03″E
- Population: 24 (SAL 2021)
- Postcode(s): 3525
- Location: 228 km (142 mi) NW of Melbourne; 92 km (57 mi) S of Swan Hill; 64 km (40 mi) SW of Kerang
- LGA(s): Shire of Buloke
- State electorate(s): Mildura
- Federal division(s): Mallee
Localities around Nareewillock:
Bunguluke	Bunguluke	Glenloth East
Glenloth	Nareewillock	Lake Marmal
Teddywaddy	Charlton	Buckrabanyule

Nareewillock is a locality in the Shire of Buloke, Victoria, Australia.

The post office there opened as Narrewillock [sic] on 1 November 1881, closed on 1 July 1895, reopened in 1902, closed on 1 December 1919, reopened again on 1 January 1921 and was closed on 30 June 1942.
