= Reedy Dam =

- Town
- Coordinates: 35°57′53″S 142°38′34″E
- Country: Australia
- State: Victoria
- LGA: Shire of Buloke
- Location: 291 km (181 mi) NW of Melbourne; 108 km (67 mi) SW of Swan Hill; 24 km (15 mi) W of Beulah

Government
  - State electorate: Mildura
  - Federal division: Mallee

Population
  - Total: 28 (SAL 2021)
- Postcode: 3395
Localities around Reedy Dam
Whirily	Kinnabulla	Kinnabulla
Beulah	Reedy Dam	Ballapur
Beulah	Wilkur	Wilkur

Reedy Dam is a locality in the Shire of Buloke, Victoria, Australia. There is a rural CFA station in the locality. A post office was opened in 1902 and closed on 31 July 1929.
