= Wilkur =

- Town
- Coordinates: 36°02′53″S 142°40′51″E
- Country: Australia
- State: Victoria
- LGAs: Shire of Buloke; Shire of Yarriambiack
- Location: 282 km (175 mi) NW of Melbourne; 112 km (70 mi) SW of Swan Hill; 85 km (53 mi) NE of Horsham

Government
  - State electorate: Mildura
  - Federal division: Mallee

Population
  - Total: 28 (2021 census)
- Postcode: 3393
Localities around Wilkur
Beulah	Reedy Dam	Ballapur
Brim	Wilkur	Warmur
Bangerang	Areegra	Watchem West

Wilkur is a locality in the Shire of Buloke and Shire of Yarriambiack, Victoria, Australia. Wilkur post office there opened in 1905, closed on 30 September 1912 reopened on 1 February 1926 and later closed on 27 May 1950. Wilkur South post office opened on 28 June 1920 and was closed on 31 July 1957. Cameron's post office opened on 1 October 1904 renamed Beyal in April 1911 and was closed on 31 August 1929.
