= Coonooer Bridge =

Coonooer Bridge Victoria
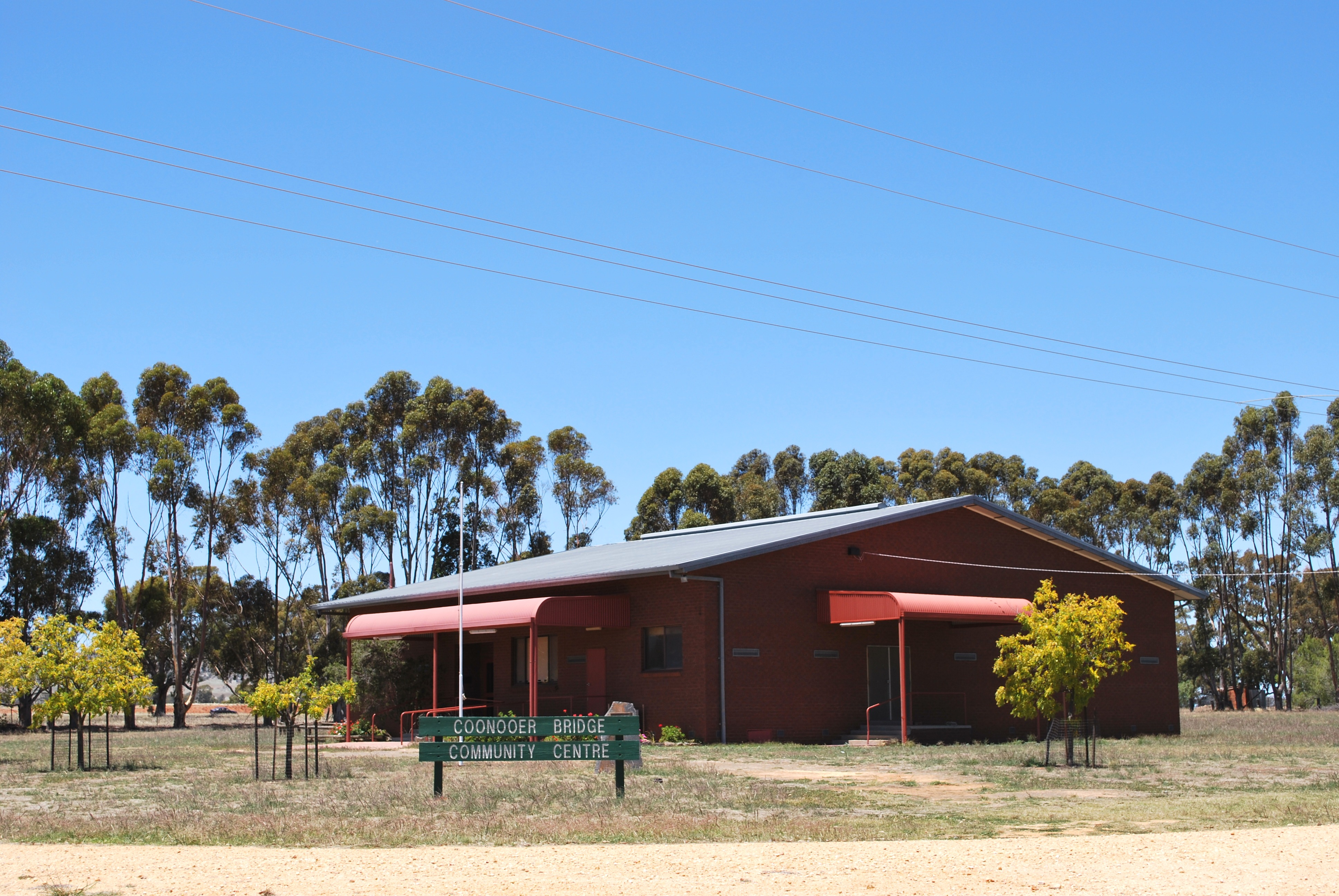
- Community centre

- Coordinates: 36°28′0″S 143°19′0″E
- Population: 30 (2021 census)
- Postcode(s): 3477
- Location: 263 km (163 mi) NW of Melbourne; 108 km (67 mi) W of Bendigo; 125 km (78 mi) E of Horsham; 17 km (11 mi) N of St Arnaud
- LGA(s): Shire of Buloke
- State electorate(s): Ripon
- Federal division(s): Mallee
Mean max temp	Mean min temp	Annual rainfall
27 °C; 81 °F	10 °C; 50 °F	450 mm 17.7 in

Coonooer Bridge is a locality in the Shire of Buloke, 263 kilometres (163 mi) north west of the state capital, Melbourne.

Coonooer Bridge Methodist Church was built in 1875 and still stands today as one of the oldest buildings in the shire.

The Coonooer Bridge Community Centre was built in 1984 and opened in October of that year. It was built on the site of the Coonooer Bridge State School which closed in 1964.

A War Memorial erected by local citizens in 1920 commemorates servicemen and women from the local area serving in the Great War and World War 2.

Coonooer Bridge Post Office opened around January 1879 and closed in 1966. A Conover (an alternative spelling of Coonooer) office was open nearby between 1873 and 1895.
