= Guido van Helten =

Australian artist (born 1986)

- Born: 1986 (age 39–40); Brisbane, Australia
- Education: Southern Cross University
- Known for: Large-scale photorealistic murals
- Style: Photorealism
- Movement: Street art (former graffiti artist)

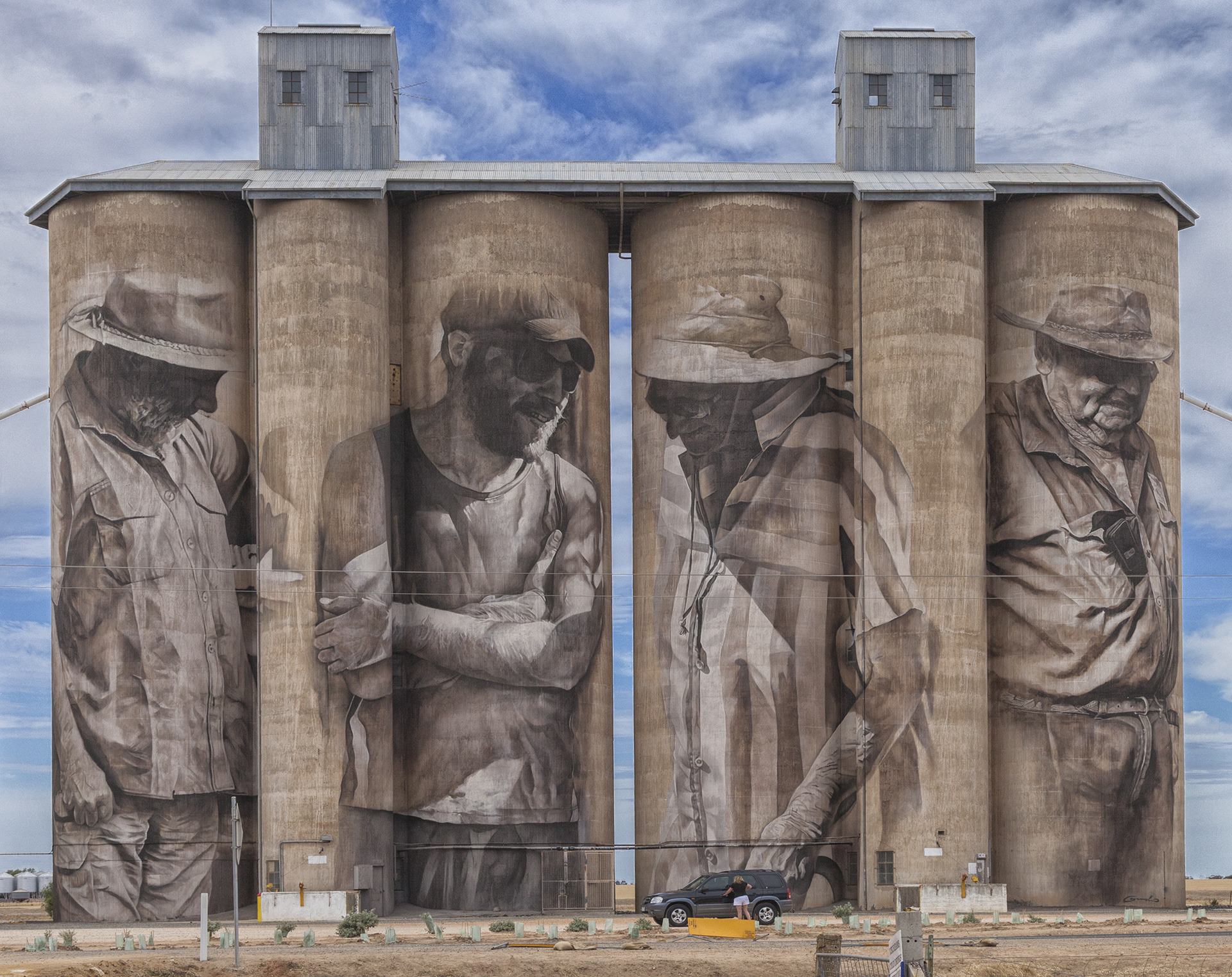
Brim Silo Art project (2015)

Guido van Helten (born 1986) is an Australian artist, known for his photorealistic murals.

Van Helten was raised in Brisbane and was a graffiti artist in his youth. He moved to Lismore, New South Wales to study visual arts at Southern Cross University, majoring in printmaking.

== Works ==
- Van Helten's work Brim Silo Art project, a large mural painted on the grain silos at Brim, Victoria, an example of the growing genre of silo art, was a finalist in 2016 Sulman Prize.
- Van Helten painted a mural on the former BB&T building in downtown Greenville, South Carolina, "to give voice to traditionally Black communities on the west side of Greenville", after a commission in 2019.
- During the 30th anniversary of the Chernobyl disaster, Van Helten painted of a photograph of the reactor taken in 1986 on the side of a cooling tower.
- In 2021, he was commissioned as the lead artist to paint 16 murals in and around the small Western Australian town of Collie, which included an 8,000-square-metre mural at the Wellington Dam Hydro Power Station.
