= Ballapur =

- Town
- Coordinates: 35°57′53″S 142°46′50″E
- Country: Australia
- State: Victoria
- LGA: Shire of Buloke
- Location: 283 km (176 mi) NW of Melbourne; 99 km (62 mi) SW of Swan Hill; 12 km (7.5 mi) W of Birchip

Government
  - State electorate: Mildura
  - Federal division: Mallee

Population
  - Total: 10 (2016 census)
- Postcode: 3483
Localities around Ballapur
Kinnabulla	Kinnabulla	Kinnabulla
Reedy Dam	Ballapur	Karyrie
Wilkur	Warmur	Birchip West

Ballapur is a locality in the local government area of the Shire of Buloke, Victoria, Australia. The post office there opened as Ballapur State School in 1902, renamed Ballapur in 1907 and was closed on 10 March 1916.
