= Teddywaddy =

- Town
- Coordinates: 36°11′45″S 143°20′26″E
- Country: Australia
- State: Victoria
- LGA: Shire of Buloke
- Location: 230 km (140 mi) NW of Melbourne; 73 km (45 mi) SW of Kerang; 16 km (9.9 mi) SE of Wycheproof

Government
  - State electorate: Mildura
  - Federal division: Mallee

Population
  - Total: 23 (SAL 2021)
- Postcode: 3527
Localities around Teddywaddy
Wycheproof	Glenloth	Glenloth
Teddywaddy West	Teddywaddy	Nareewillock
Teddywaddy West	Charlton	Charlton

Teddywaddy is a locality in the Shire of Buloke, Victoria, Australia. The name derives from the language of the original inhabitants of the area, the Djadjawurrung people, and is traditionally translated as "muddy water".

In the early 20th century, when the size of farms was relatively small, the population of Teddywaddy was about 230, but the consolidation of farming properties since then has resulted in the population dropping to 23 by 2021.

Teddywaddy post office opened on 1 August 1881, and was closed on 31 July 1973.

A rural CFA station is located on 'Lot 1 Teddywaddy Road.

Teddywaddy is signposted in the 1976 film Oz.
