= Wychitella North =

- Town
- Coordinates: 36°12′17″S 143°47′2″E
- Country: Australia
- State: Victoria
- LGA: Shire of Loddon

Government
  - State electorate: Ripon
  - Federal division: Mallee

Population
  - Total: 18 (2021 census)
- Postcode: 3525

Wychitella North is a locality in the Shire of Loddon, Victoria, Australia. At the 2021 census, Wychitella North had a population of 18.
