= Brim, Victoria =

Brim
- Town
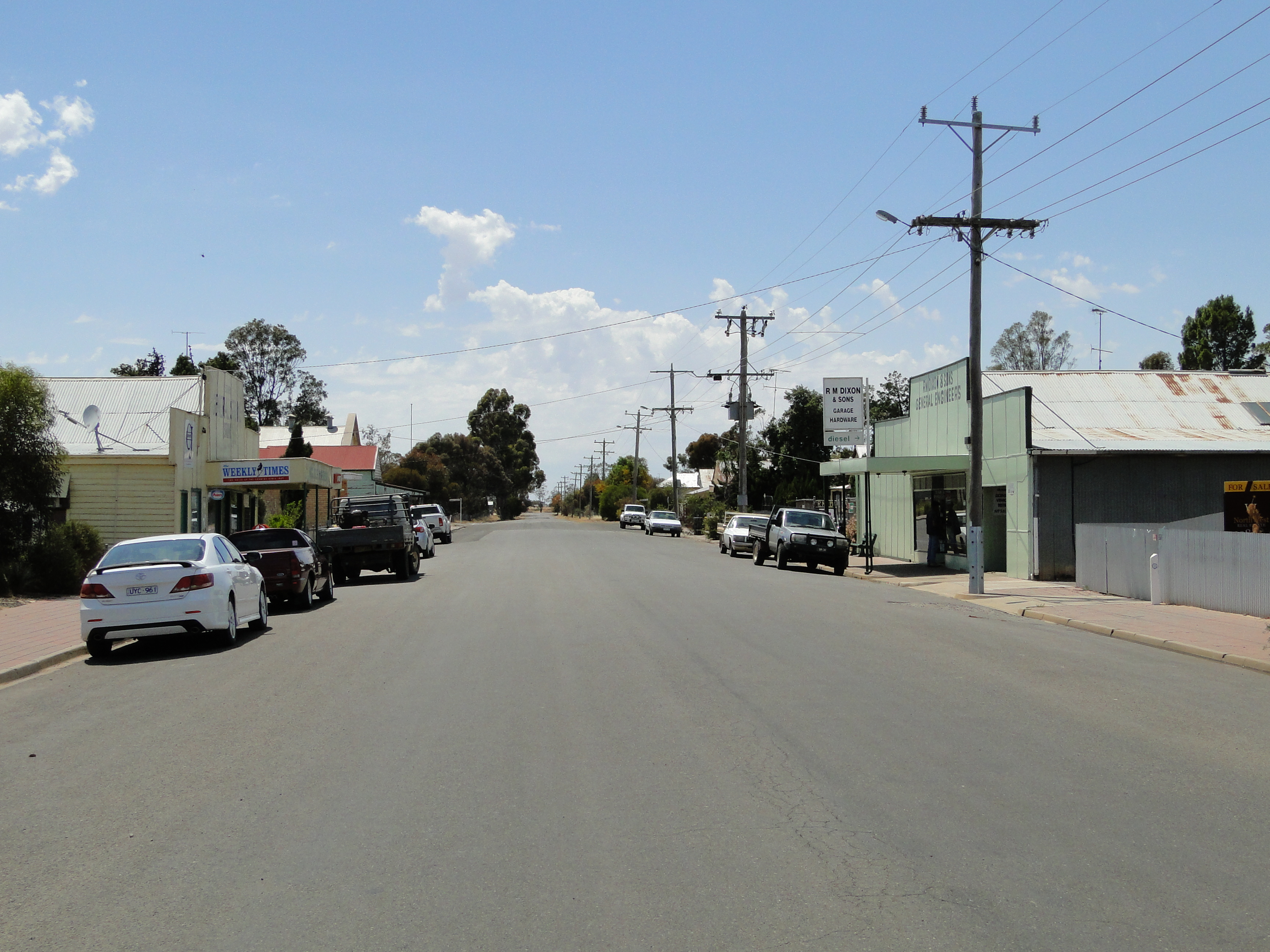
- Swann Street, the main street of Brim

- Coordinates: 36°04′S 142°25′E
- Country: Australia
- State: Victoria
- LGA: Shire of Yarriambiack
- Location: 359 km (223 mi) NW of Melbourne; 76 km (47 mi) N of Horsham; 20 km (12 mi) N of Warracknabeal
- Established: 1890

Government
  - State electorate: Lowan
  - Federal division: Mallee

Population
  - Total: 171 (2016 census)
- Postcode: 3391
Localities around Brim
Willenabrina	Beulah	Wilkur
Willenabrina	Brim	Wilkur
Crymelon	Lah	Bangerang

Brim is a town in the Wimmera region of Victoria, Australia. The town is located 359 kilometres (223 mi) north west of the state capital, Melbourne on the Henty Highway. It is on the banks of the Yarriambiack Creek. It is in the Shire of Yarriambiack local government area. At the 2016 census, Brim had a population of 171.

== History ==
The area was first settled by Europeans in 1846 when the Brim station was established on the banks of the Yarriambiack Creek. When the town was surveyed in 1890, it was laid out over part of the station cemetery. One grave, that of James Simson, is still in good condition on the side of the road now called Simson Street. The station homestead, Willowbank, was built about 1870, and is still standing. There are also stables and other outbuildings from this era.

The Post Office opened on 3 October 1890. The railway arrived in 1893 on the line from Murtoa to Hopetoun. The railway station is no longer standing, but there are large grain silos on the railway station site. The railway tracks were converted to standard gauge in 1995 to allow large trains carrying mineral sands from Hopetoun to Hamilton.

Brim Football Club won the 1914 Mallee Football Association premiership.

== Today ==
Golfers play at the Brim Golf Club at the Recreation Reserve. The Brim Memorial Lawn Bowling club is also located in town playing in the local competition against clubs in nearby towns including Hopetoun and Warracknabeal. There is only one hotel in town, the Commercial Hotel, which is located on the corner of Swann and Dixon streets.

A recent addition to the town (2015) is the painting by the Brisbane artist Guido van Helten of a large scale mural on the grain silo which is a prominent feature of the town.

== Gallery ==
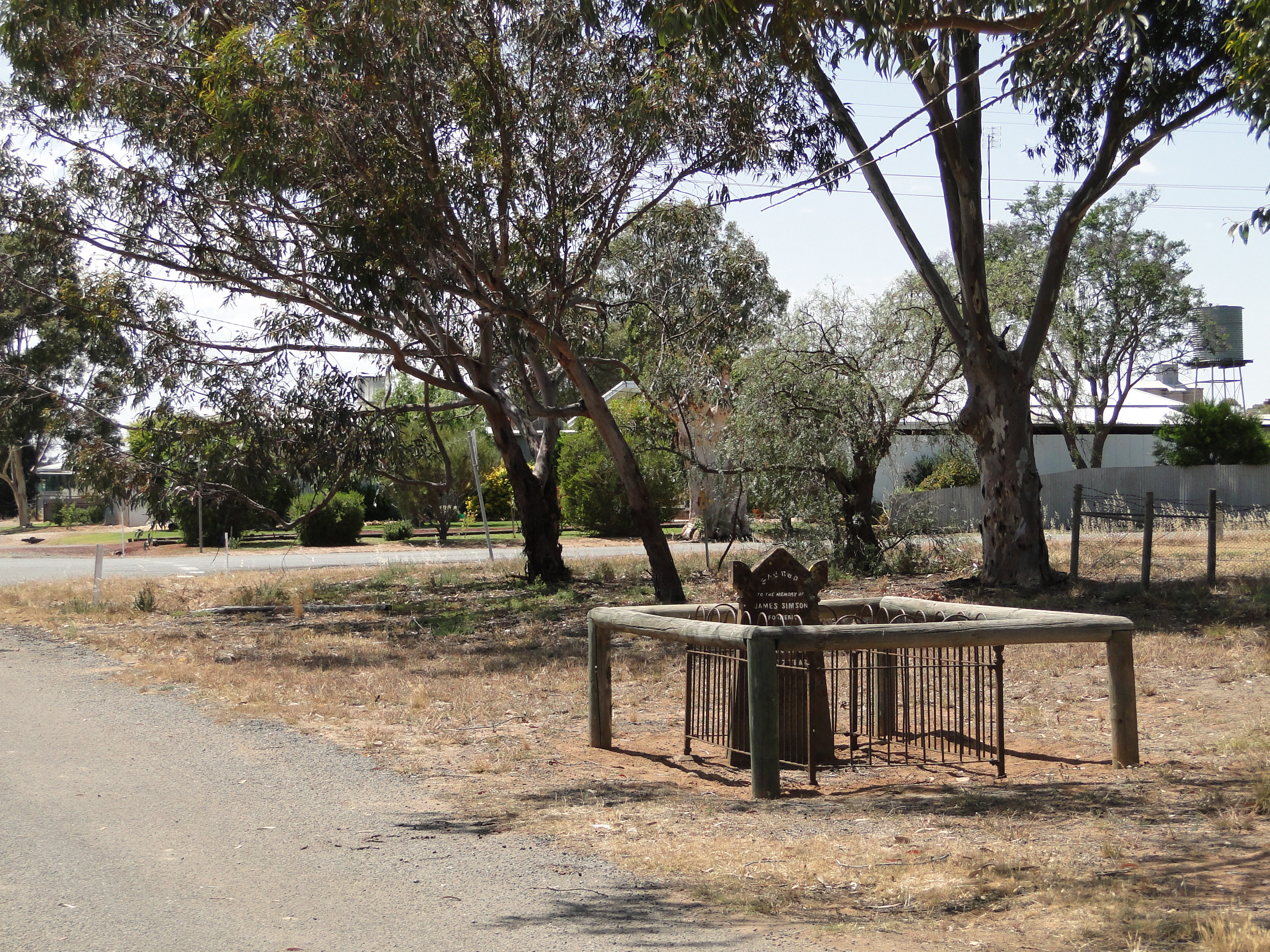
James Simson's grave (1858)

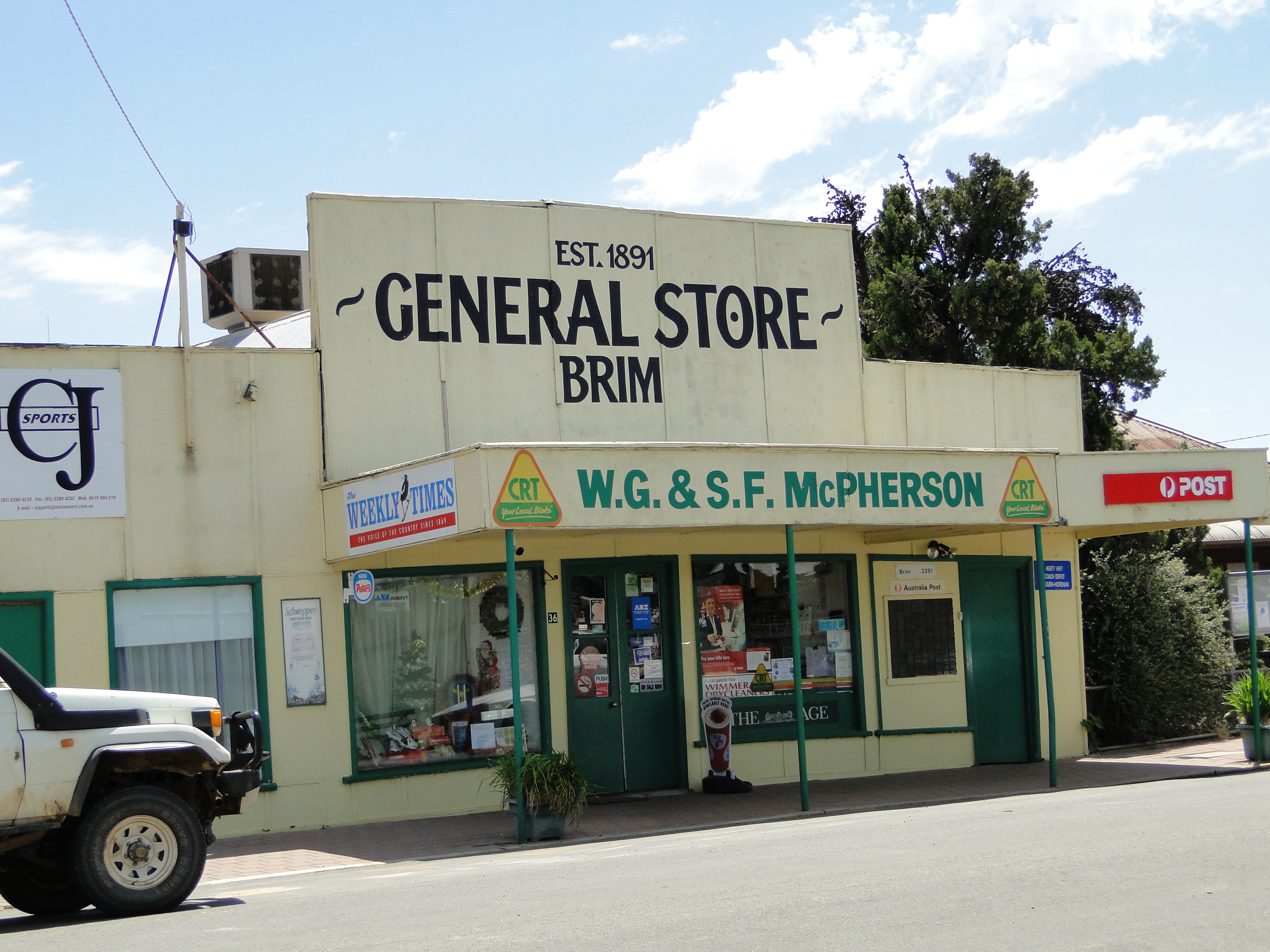
Brim general store (1891)

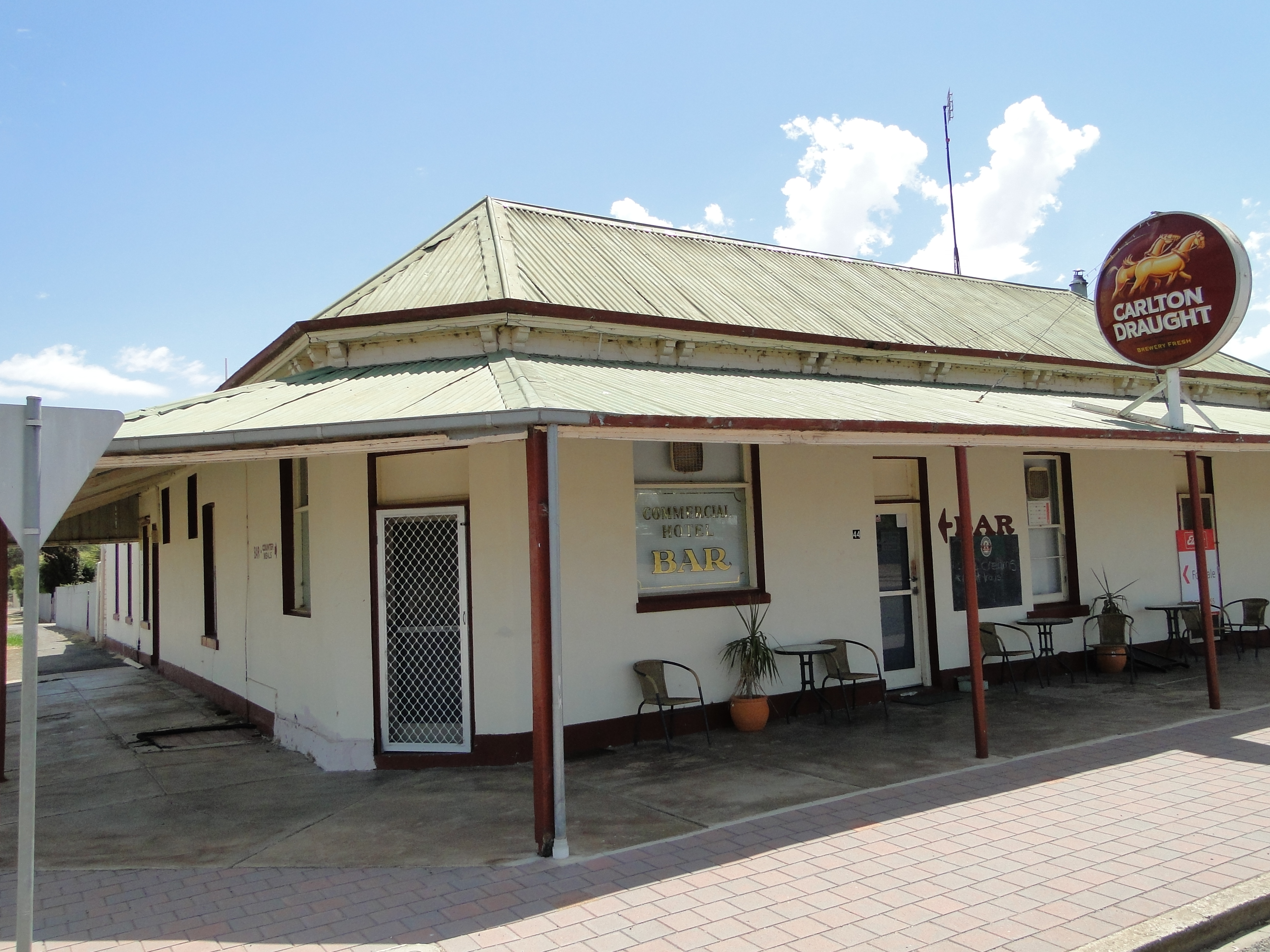
Commercial Hotel

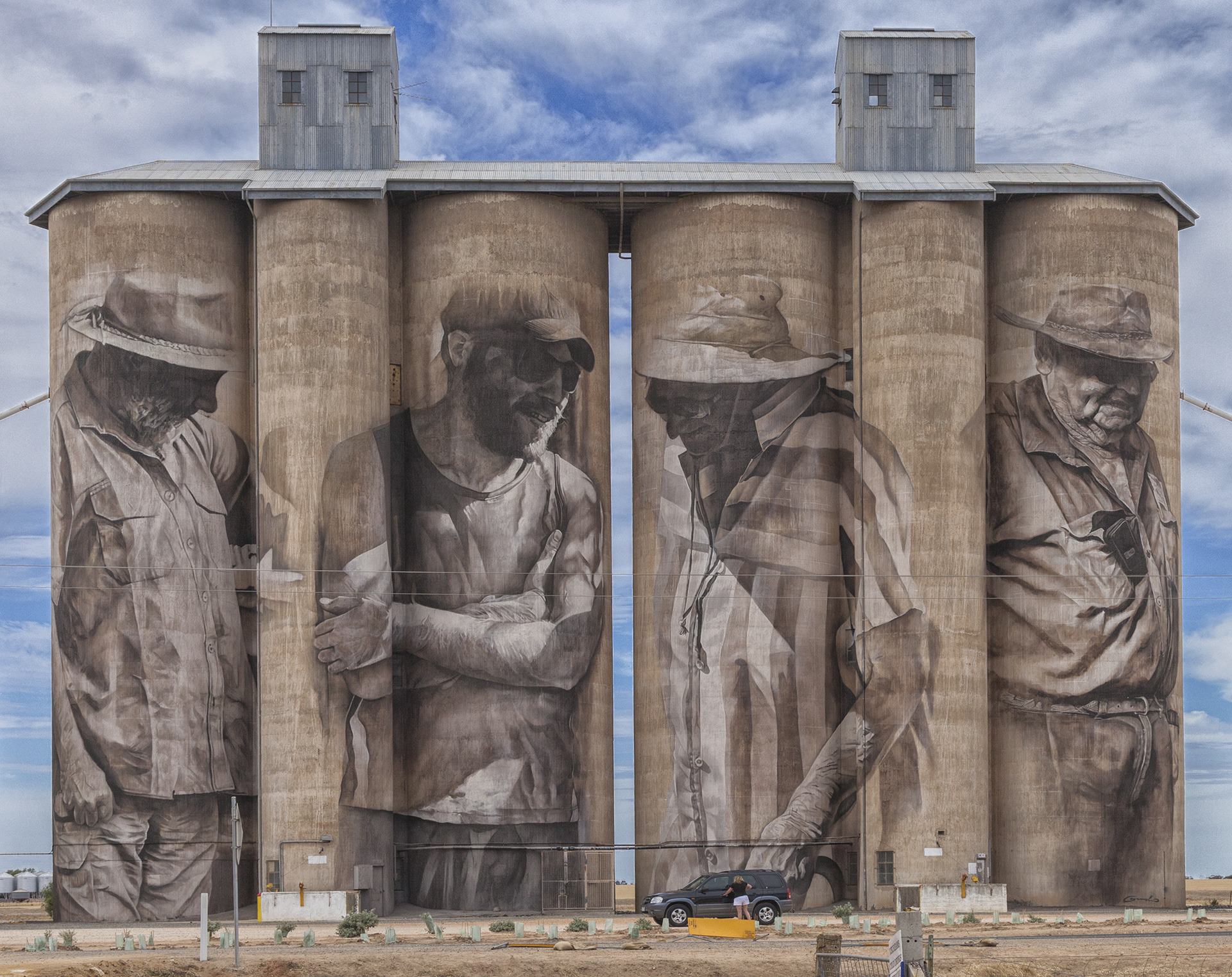
Silo mural, painted by Guido van Helten in December 2015
