= Meeting of Styles =

International network of graffiti artists and supporters

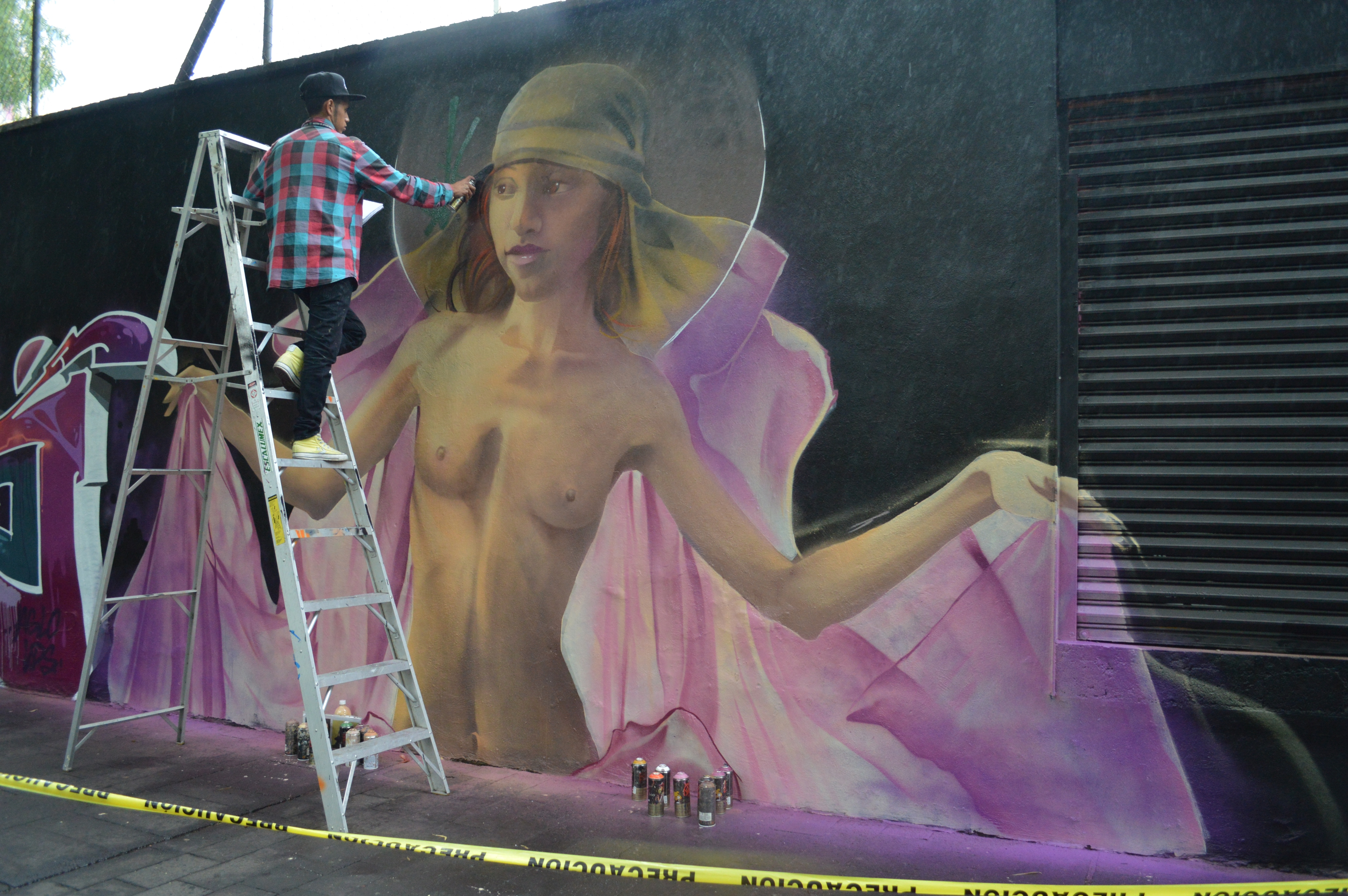
- Artist participating in a local event
- Founded at: Wiesbaden, Germany
- Purpose: Promote graffiti art

Meeting of Styles is an international network of graffiti artists and supporters, which sponsors graffiti mural creation events in over sixteen countries. The purpose of the events is to promote and legitimize the art form. The idea surged in 1995 in Germany, reorganized under the current name in 2002. Events create murals in various kinds of locations, which can include public spaces such as subways. However, there have been conflicts with authorities during and even after events.

== Organization and events ==
Graffiti artists working on a piece in the historic center of Mexico City at the 2015 event

Meeting of Styles refers to an international network of graffiti artists and fans, which exists to gain legitimacy for graffiti artists and their work. Internationally it is a non-profit organization, with local affiliates which sponsor graffiti events, and is one of the most important organizations of its type in the world. Events have been held in over sixteen countries in Europe, Russian Asia and the Americas. The events are announced ahead of time with flyers, press releases to the general public as well as the graffiti artist community, and attracts spectators, local media as well as graffiti artists.

These events attract veteran graffiti and well-known artists, who have often gained their reputation with illegal works, from countries such as Spain, Greece, Germany, Brazil, the United States, Canada, Costa Rica and the United Kingdom. These events are not only for graffiti but also supports other kinds of street art. Spaces for murals and other works range from temporary walls on construction sites to walls inside the Mexico City Metro. However, the organizing of local events is challenged by local politics, with various levels of support, and the need for sponsors.

== History ==
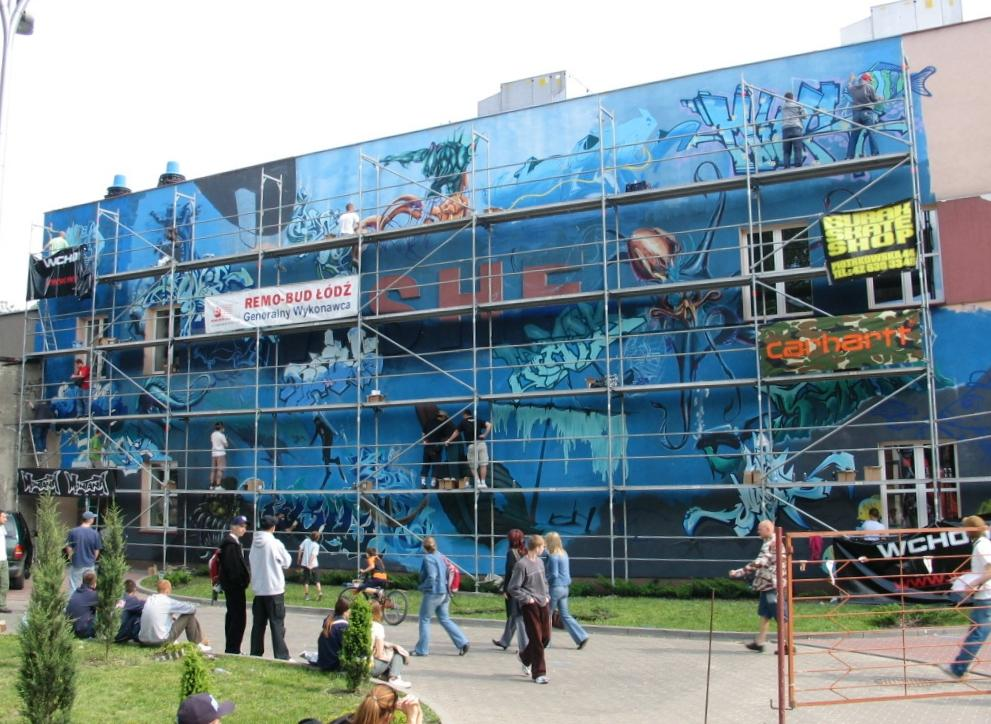
Mural in progress at the 2006 event in Łódź, Poland

Meeting of styles began as an international meeting of graffiti artists held at the Kulturzentrum Schlachthof in Wiesbaden Hall of Fame, an abandoned and very large structure. The idea emerged in 1995, but the first event took place in 1997 under the name "Wall Street Meeting". By 2000, the event was drawing more than 10,000 people but began to have trouble with the authorities when participants began tagging nearby train cars. When police responded, rocks were thrown. In 2001, the building was torn down.

The current organization was founded in 2002, and since then, has sponsored over 250 events worldwide. However, events related to this organization have not been without controversy. An event was organized in 2007 for the concrete channel walls of the Arroyo Seco Confluence of the Los Angeles River. After the event, the county government stated that the permit process for the event was not finalized and that the murals would have to be taken down. Organizers refused, and in 2008, the county painted over the murals, causing charges of censorship, among other accusations.
