= Catumnal =

- Town
- Coordinates: 36°04′50″S 143°37′28.4″E
- Country: Australia
- State: Victoria
- LGA: Shire of Loddon

Government
  - State electorate: Murray Plains
  - Federal division: Mallee

Population
  - Total: 14 (2021 census)
- Postcode: 3537

Catumnal is a locality in the Shire of Loddon, Victoria, Australia. At the 2021 census, Catumnal had a population of 14.
