= Shire of Kara Kara =

Coordinates: 36°36′S 143°15′E

- Local government area
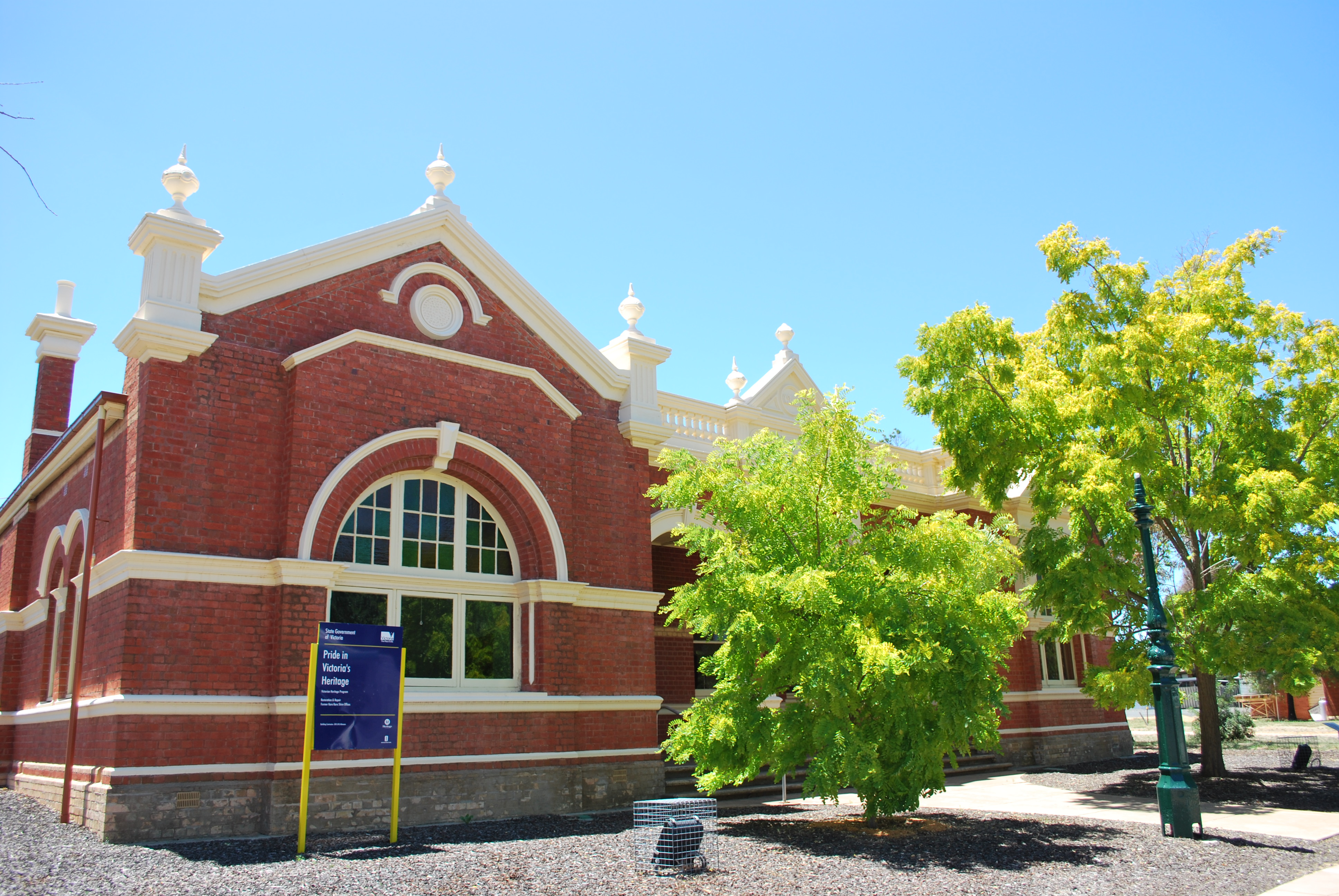
- Former Shire offices in St Arnaud
- The Shire of Kara Kara as at its dissolution in 1995
- Country: Australia
- State: Victoria
- Region: Wimmera
- Established: 1861
- Council seat: St Arnaud

Area
  - Total: 2,292.79 km^{2} (885.25 sq mi)

Population
  - Total(s): 1,160 (1992)
  - Density: 0.5059/km^{2} (1.310/sq mi)
- County: Kara Kara
LGAs around Shire of Kara Kara
Donald	Charlton	Charlton
Dunmunkle	Shire of Kara Kara	Korong
Stawell	Avoca	Bet Bet

The Shire of Kara Kara was a local government area about 240 kilometres (149 mi) northwest of Melbourne, the state capital of Victoria, Australia. The shire covered an area of 2,292.79 square kilometres (885.3 sq mi), and existed from 1861 until 1995.

== History ==
Kara Kara was first incorporated as the St Arnaud Road District on 25 June 1861, which became a shire on 14 November 1864. It was renamed as Kara Kara on 20 October 1884.

On 20 January 1995, the Shire of Kara Kara was abolished, and along with the City of Stawell, the Town of St Arnaud, and parts of the Shires of Ararat, Avoca, Donald, Dunmunkle, Stawell and the Grampians National Park section of the Shire of Wimmera, was merged into the newly created Shire of Northern Grampians. The Cope Cope district was transferred to the newly created Shire of Buloke.

== Wards ==
The Shire of Kara Kara was divided into three ridings, each of which elected three councillors:

- South Riding
- East Riding
- West Riding

== Towns and localities ==
- Avon Plains
- Beazleys Bridge
- Carapooee
- Coonooer West
- Cope Cope
- Emu
- Gooroc
- Gowar East
- Gre Gre
- Kooreh
- Moolerr
- Paradise
- Rostron
- Slaty Creek
- Stuart Mill
- St Arnaud North
- Sutherland
- Swanwater
- Tottington
- Traynors Lagoon
- Winjallok

== Population ==
Year	Population
1954	1,663
1958	1,680*
1961	1,421
1966	1,360
1971	1,193
1976	1,099
1981	1,069
1986	1,142
1991	1,123

* Estimate in the 1958 Victorian Year Book.
