= Watchem =

Watchem Victoria
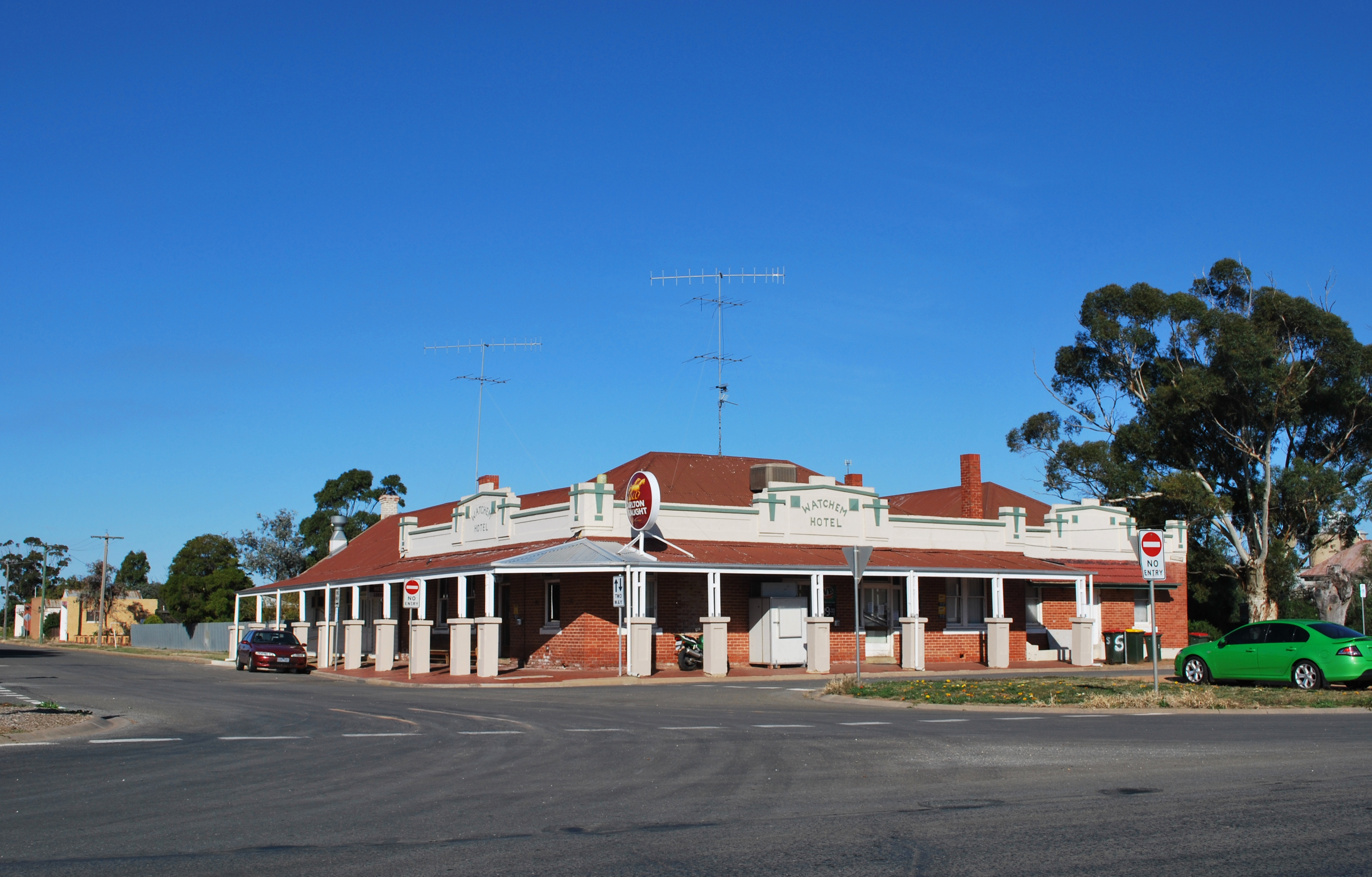
- Watchem Hotel

- Coordinates: 36°09′0″S 142°51′0″E
- Population: 124 (2021 census)
- Postcode(s): 3482
- Location: 307 km (191 mi) NW of Melbourne; 167 km (104 mi) NW of Bendigo; 104 km (65 mi) NE of Horsham; 48 km (30 mi) E of Warracknabeal; 35 km (22 mi) N of Donald
- LGA(s): Shire of Buloke
- State electorate(s): Mildura
- Federal division(s): Mallee

Watchem is a town in north western Victoria, Australia. The town is in the Shire of Buloke local government area and on the Sunraysia Highway, 307 kilometres (191 mi) north west of the state capital, Melbourne and 35 kilometres (22 mi) from nearby Donald. At the 2021 census, Watchem and the surrounding area had a population of 124.

Watchem has a thriving lake based within walking distance from the town centre.

The Post Office opened on 2 November 1889.

With its neighbouring township Birchip, Watchem has a football team (Birchip-Watchem) competing in the North Central Football League.

Watchem also has a cricket team named the Watchem Panthers. They play at the Watchem Cricket Ground and compete in the Wimmera-Mallee Cricket Association B Grade. In the 2024/2025 season the Watchem Panthers won the Grand Final against Donald-Jeffcott C.C played at Marnoo Cricket Ground (M.C.G).

== History ==
There are many stories told on how the name Watchem came to be, one of the more plausible stories being that the name came from the Aboriginal name for wattle, which has been known to grow near Watchem Lake. Another story is that 'Watchem' came from the aboriginal word “place the hop bush (Dodonaea) grows”

However, the name came to be the one designated to the town according to early documentation such as “land Department maps, road surveys and building applications” has been around since at least the 1860s.

The land was also home to the Banynong tribe who were situated alongside the Watchem Lake area.

According to early documentation, the first “land selection” was realised by the Donohue family in 1873. In 1874, Martin Donohue completed the first wool clip for this area, covering several properties on the route between Watchem and Ballarat. Additionally, he was also responsible for the first wheat delivery to Dunolly in 1875.

By 1875, the town had reached its peak in population, whereby many families from towns south of Watchem moved into the area, some of which are still located there today.

By the end of 1875 the town was officially recognised as a settlement and gained township status.

== Watchem Lake ==
The Watchem Lake is located 3 km west of Watchem on the Warracknabeal road and consists of a playground, camping places, a BBQ area and the lake proper.

Watchem Lake area was upgraded in 2018 with the upgrades finishing on 22 December, in time for the Christmas holidays. These updates made way for better campgrounds, toilets and a playground.

== Watchem Swimming Pool ==
The Watchem Pool is another major attraction to this small town. The swimming pool has free admission to anyone, and has no memberships. When open, swimmers may simply show up with a towel and suitable swimwear.It is completely outdoors, although it still offers seated arrangements under the shade. Other areas of this complex include a shower and bathroom area and a storage area where spare swimming equipment is kept.

The complex comprises three different size swimming pools: a baby pool, a smaller child's pool and the main pool, which has both a shallow and a deep end.
