= Barraport West =

- Town
- Coordinates: 36°1′3″S 143°32′4″E
- Country: Australia
- State: Victoria
- LGA: Shire of Loddon

Government
  - State electorate: Murray Plains
  - Federal division: Mallee

Population
  - Total: 10 (2016 census)
- Postcode: 3537

Barraport West is a locality in Shire of Loddon, Victoria, Australia. At the 2016 census, Barraport West had a population of 10.
