= Glenloth =

Glenloth Victoria
- Coordinates: 36°06′0″S 143°19′0″E
- Population: 6 (2016 census)
- Postcode(s): 3527
- Location: 262 km (163 mi) from Melbourne; 191 km (119 mi) from Bendigo; 15 km (9 mi) from Wycheproof
- LGA(s): Shire of Buloke
- State electorate(s): Mildura
- Federal division(s): Mallee
Localities around Glenloth:
Wycheproof	Bunguluke	Bunguluke
Wycheproof	Glenloth	Nareewillock
Teddywaddy	Teddywaddy	Nareewillock

Glenloth is a locality in the Shire of Buloke, Victoria, Australia, located approximately 121 kilometres (75 mi) from Bendigo.

Glenloth Post Office opened on 22 October 1879; Glenloth Railway Station Post Office opened on 1 March 1884. In 1910 the railway station office was renamed Glenloth, and Glenloth became Glenloth East.
