= Buckrabanyule =

- Town
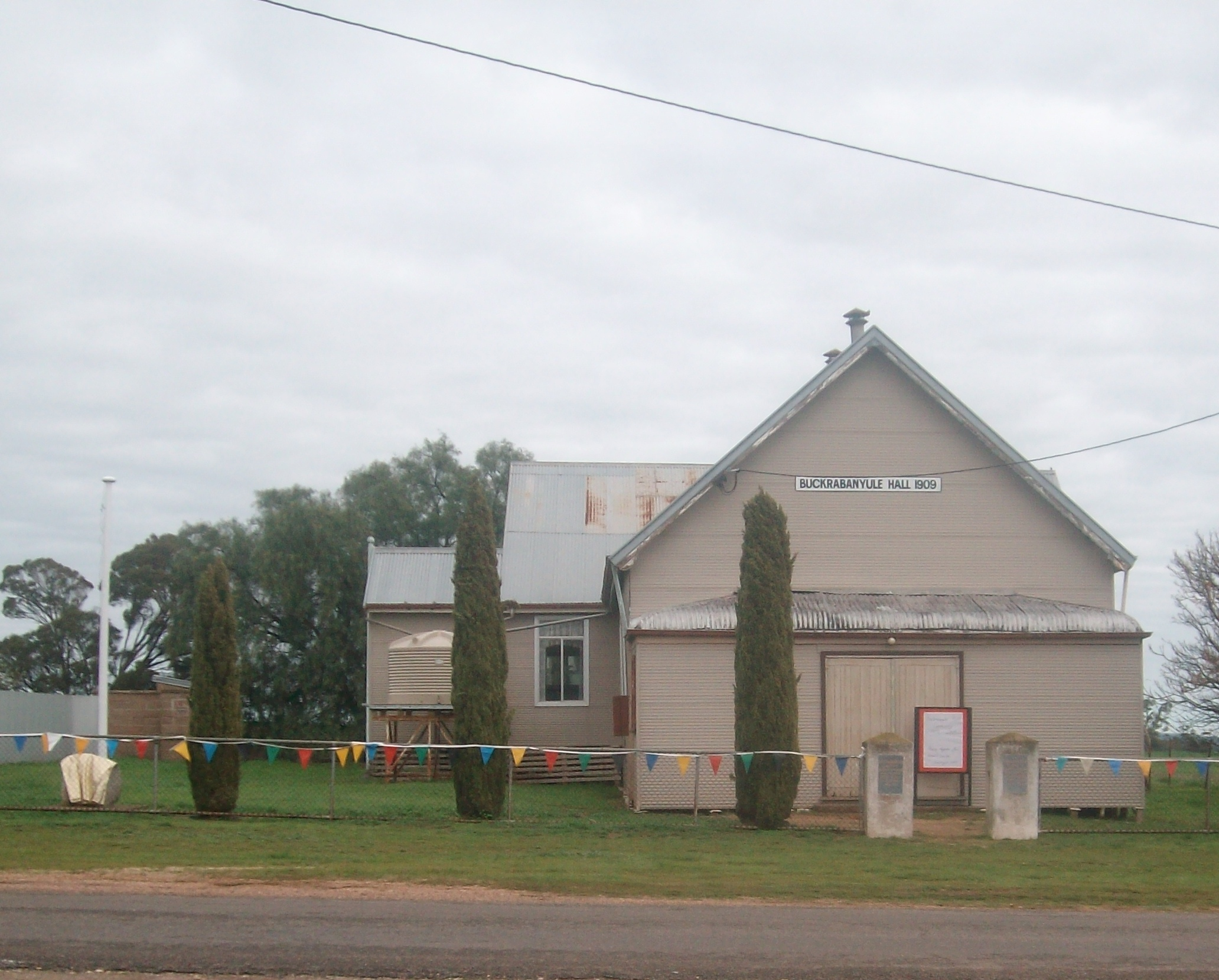
- The Buckrabanyule Hall on the day of the centenary celebrations

- Coordinates: 36°15′0″S 143°31′0″E
- Country: Australia
- State: Victoria
- LGAs: Shire of Buloke; Shire of Loddon
- Location: 237 km (147 mi) NW of Melbourne; 97 km (60 mi) NW of Bendigo; 18 km (11 mi) E of Charlton

Government
  - State electorate: Mildura
  - Federal division: Mallee

Population
  - Total: 52 (2021 census)
- Postcode: 3525

Buckrabanyule is a locality the Shire of Buloke and the Shire of Loddon, Victoria in Australia. It is 237 kilometres (147 mi) from Melbourne, Victoria's capital city. At the 2021 census, Buckrabanyule had a population of 52.

== History ==
Buckrabanyule is an Australian Aboriginal name meaning "last of the hills" or "last of the ranges", which is a rather appropriate description, since geographically, Mount Buckrabanyule (which lies just north of the locality) is at the very end of the north-eastern extension of the Great Dividing Range. Standing atop Mount Buckrabanyule and looking north, the landscape is very flat all the way to the horizon.

The Post Office opened on 23 November 1875. It was renamed Hallam in 1884 when an office named Buckrabanyule R.S (for Railway Station) was opened some distance away.

This latter office became Buckrabanyule in 1902 and closed in 1992.

The remains of a Community Hall, Fire Station, Post Office and grain silos beside the railway line are all that is left. A church used to operate but was destroyed in a windstorm.

The primary school records are available for the earlier stages of the community history.

On 2 August 2009, the community celebrated 100 years of the Buckrabanyule Hall, which was built in 1909 and officially opened on 31 July 1909. The hall is still regularly used by locals for meetings, community get-togethers and the annual Christmas tree.
