= Shire of Buloke =

Coordinates: 36°00′00″S 142°59′16″E

Buloke Shire Council
- Local government area
- Location in Victoria

- Interactive map of Buloke Shire Council
- Country: Australia
- State: Victoria
- Region: Loddon Mallee
- Established: 1995
- Council seat: Wycheproof

Government
  - Mayor: Cr Graeme Milne
  - State electorate: Mildura
  - Federal division: Mallee

Area
  - Total: 8,000 km^{2} (3,100 sq mi)

Population
  - Total: 6,201 (2021)
  - Density: 0.78/km^{2} (2.01/sq mi)
- Gazetted: 20 January 1995
- Website: Buloke Shire Council
LGAs around Buloke Shire Council
Mildura	Swan Hill	Gannawarra
Yarriambiack	Buloke Shire Council	Loddon
Yarriambiack	Northern Grampians	Loddon

The Shire of Buloke is a local government area in Victoria, Australia, located in the western part of the state. It covers an area of 8,000 square kilometres (3,100 mi^{2}) and, in August 2021, had a population of 6,201. It includes the towns of Birchip, Charlton, Donald, Sea Lake and Wycheproof.

The Shire is governed and administered by the Buloke Shire Council; its seat of local government and administrative centre is located at the Council headquarters in Wycheproof, it also has service centres located in Birchip, Charlton, Donald and Sea Lake. The Shire is named after a major geographical feature in the region, Lake Buloke, which is located in the south of the LGA; the name also comes from the "buloke" or "bulloak" tree Allocasuarina luehmannii, which is common in the region.

Within the Shire, agriculture, particularly grain production, is the predominant source of income and employment.

== History ==
The Shire of Buloke was formed in 1995 from the amalgamation of the Shire of Wycheproof, Shire of Birchip, Shire of Charlton, Shire of Donald, and parts of the Shire of Kara Kara.

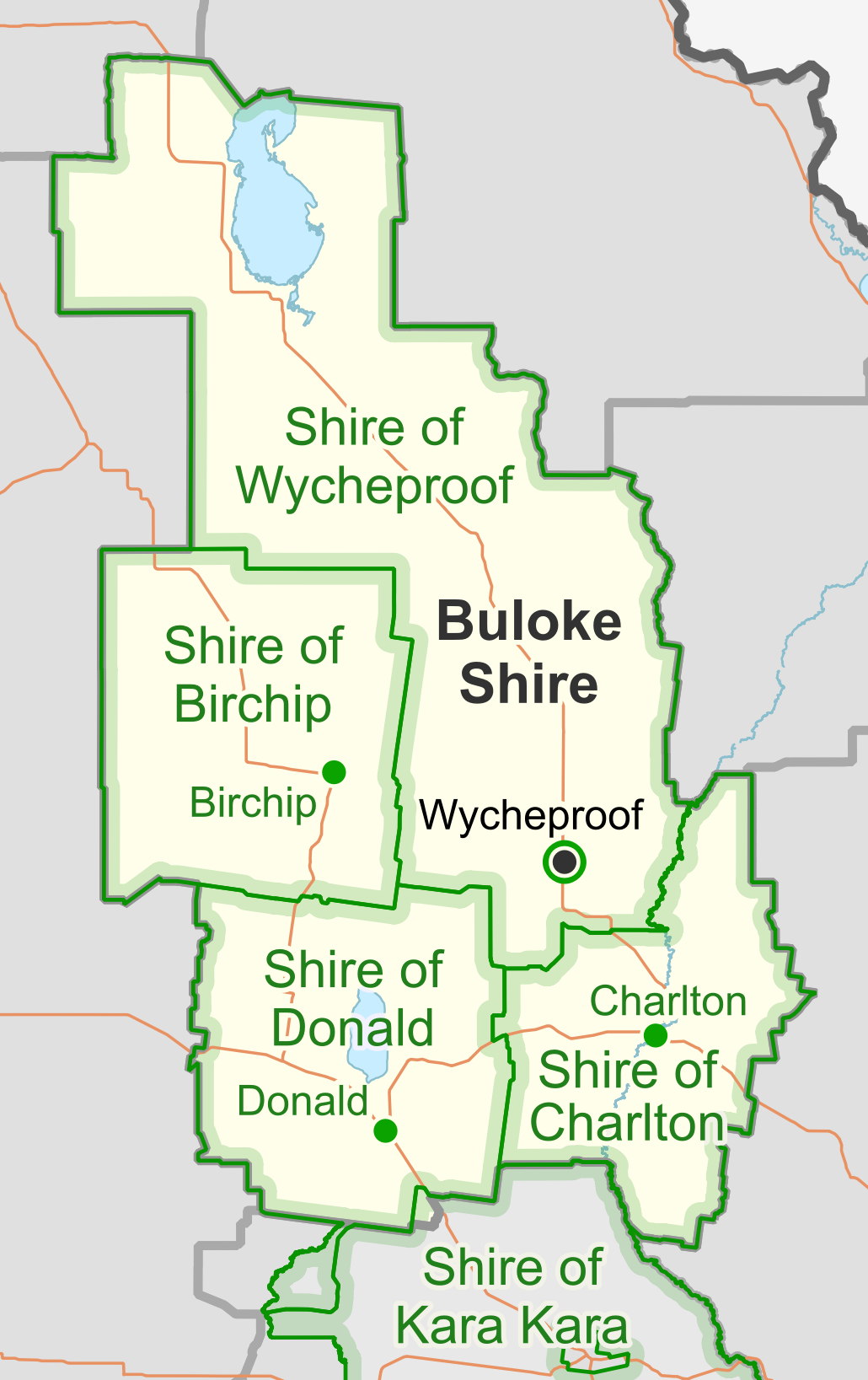
Buloke Shire's predecessor LGAs (green) as they were in 1994. The administrative centres of the former LGAs are marked by green dots.

== Council ==
=== Current composition ===
The council is composed of three wards and six councillors, with two councillors elected to represent each of the wards.

Ward	Councillor	Notes
Lower Avoca	Bruce Stafford	
Lower Avoca	Stephen Barratt	
Mallee	Bernadette Hogan	
Mallee	Alan Getley	
Mount Jeffcott	Graeme Milne	Mayor
Mount Jeffcott	Charmaine Delaney	

=== Administration and governance ===
The council meets in the council chambers at the council headquarters in the Wycheproof Municipal Offices, which is also the location of the council's administrative activities. It also provides customer services at its administrative centre in Wycheproof.

== Election results ==
=== 2024 ===
2024 Victorian local elections: Buloke
Party	Votes	%	Swing	Seats	Change
Independent	2,589	100.00	0.00	6	Steady
Formal votes	2,589	98.18			
Informal votes	48	1.82			
Total	2,637	100.00			
Registered voters / turnout	3,085	85.48			

=== 2020 ===
2020 Victorian local elections: Buloke
Party	Votes	%	Swing	Seats	Change
Independent	1,346	100.0		7	Steady
Formal votes	1,346	99.12			
Informal votes	12	0.88			
Total	1,358	100.00			

== Towns and localities ==
In the 2021 census, the shire's population was 6,178, down from 6,201 in the 2016 census.

Population
Locality	2016	2021
Ballapur	10	19
Banyan	25	22
Barrakee	18	22
Berriwillock	184	180
Bimbourie	9	11
Birchip	702	694
Birchip West	3	9
Boigbeat	8	19
Buckrabanyule^	51	52
Bunguluke	21	18
Carron	18	18
Charlton	1,050	1,095
Chirrip	8	8
Cokum	3	0
Coonooer Bridge^	31	30
Cope Cope^	58	42
Corack	23	33
Corack East	22	10
Culgoa	101	86
Curyo	26	20
Donald	1,498	1,472
Dooboobetic	9	13

Population
Locality	2016	2021
Dumosa	24	18
Gil Gil	12	23
Glenloth	6	7
Glenloth East^	13	14
Granite Flat	*	#
Jeffcott	34	34
Jeffcott North	9	18
Jeruk	14	6
Jil Jil	18	17
Kalpienung	28	28
Karyrie	20	15
Kinnabulla	32	26
Laen^	*	4
Laen East	11	6
Laen North	15	14
Lake Marmal^	21	21
Lake Tyrrell	0	0
Lawler^	19	16
Litchfield	51	36
Marlbed	0	6
Massey	10	23
Morton Plains	9	10

Population
Locality	2016	2021
Myall	10	17
Nandaly	39	30
Nareewillock	23	24
Narraport	46	50
Ninda	14	9
Nine Mile^	22	19
Nullawil	93	92
Nyarrin	24	17
Pier Milan	8	6
Reedy Dam	24	28
Rich Avon	3	3
Richmond Plains^	3	9
Sea Lake	640	619
Springfield	3	9
Straten	4	11
Sutton	3	3
Teddywaddy	17	23
Teddywaddy West	15	12
Terrappee^	22	20
Thalia	10	4
Tittybong^	3	3
Towaninny^	11	4

Population
Locality	2016	2021
Towaninny South	0	0
Turriff East	3	7
Tyenna	3	4
Tyrrell^	13	16
Tyrrell Downs	11	9
Wangie	5	11
Warmur	16	31
Warne	4	13
Watchem	114	124
Watchem West^	18	29
Watchupga	41	43
Whirily	30	25
Wilkur^	49	28
Willangie	35	35
Wooroonook	20	26
Woosang^	11	12
Wycheproof	635	610
Wycheproof South	12	6
Yawong Hills	0	5
Yeungroon	31	34
Yeungroon East^	16	11

^ - Territory divided with another LGA
* - Not noted in 2016 Census
# - Not noted in 2021 Census

== Traditional owners ==
The traditional owners of this area are the Wotjobaluk, Jaadwa, Jadawadjali, Wergaia and Jupagalk and Dja Dja Wurrung.

== See also ==
- List of places of worship in Buloke Shire
- List of places on the Victorian Heritage Register in the Shire of Buloke
