= Donald, Victoria =

Donald
- Town
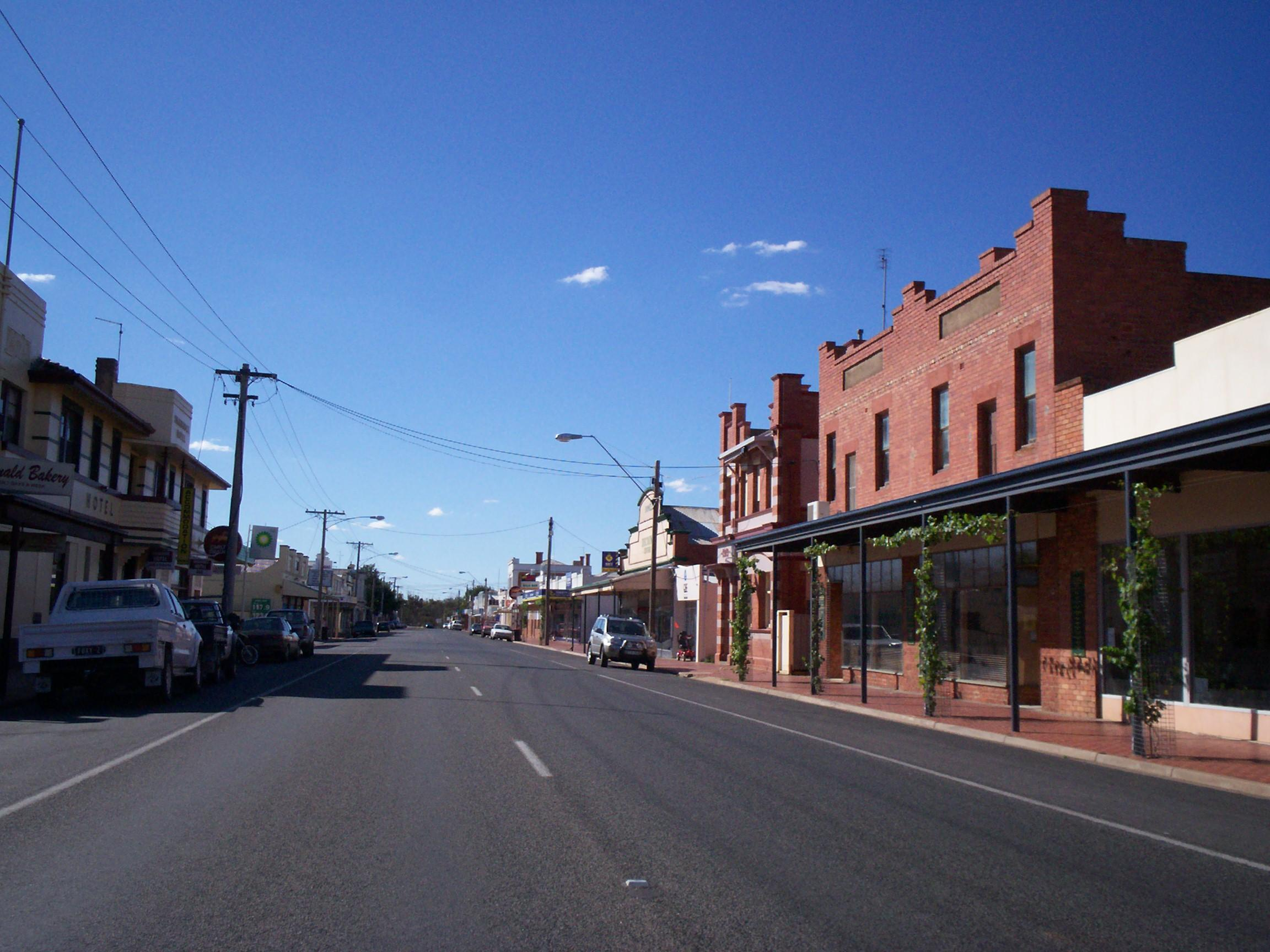
- The main street, 2007

- Coordinates: 36.3157°S 142.9526°E
- Country: Australia
- State: Victoria
- LGA: Shire of Buloke
- Location: 282 km (175 mi) from Melbourne; 144 km (89 mi) from Bendigo; 90 km (56 mi) from Horsham

Government
  - State electorate: Mildura, Northern Victoria
  - Federal division: Mallee
- Elevation: 114 m (374 ft)

Population
  - Total: 1,472 (2021 census)
- Postcode: 3480
- Mean max temp: 21.3 °C (70.3 °F)
- Mean min temp: 8.8 °C (47.8 °F)
- Annual rainfall: 385.6 mm (15.18 in)

Donald is a town in Victoria, Australia, located on the Richardson River, at the junction of Sunraysia Highway and Borung Highway, in the Shire of Buloke. At the 2021 census, it had a population of 1,472.

== History ==
The town is named after William Donald, a Scottish pastoralist who was the first settler in the area in 1844. At the 2021 census, Donald had a population of 1,472. The earliest township was known as Richardson Bridge until surveyed as Donald in 1866. The Donald Post Office opened on 1 August 1870 replacing that of nearby Mount Jeffcott which had operated since 1860.

The town grew steadily boosted by the closer settlement of the surrounding countryside and the arrival of the railway in 1882.

Sir Albert Dunstan, Premier of Victoria 1935–43, was born in Donald in July 1882.

On 26 September 2006, Donald was the scene of the Borung Highway collision in which seven people died.

Donald is occasionally affected by floods. Major floods have occurred in August 1909, 1918, 1956, 1975, 1992 and January 2011. The area also suffered a major drought period in the 1990s and 2000s, significantly impacting the community which primarily relies on crop farming to survive.

== Traditional ownership ==
The formally recognised traditional owners for the area in which Donald sits are the Wotjobaluk, Jaadwa, Jadawadjali, Wergaia and Jupagik nations. These nations are represented by the Barengi Gadjin Land Council Aboriginal Corporation.

== Demographics ==
As of the 2021 census, 1,472 people resided in Donald. The median age of persons in Donald was 52 years. Children aged 0–14 years made up 15.7% of the population. People over the age of 65 years made up 31.7% of the population There were slightly more females than males with 50.5% of the population female and 49.5% male. The average household size is 2.1 persons per household. The average number of children per family for families with children is 1.9.

82.3% of people were born in Australia. Of all persons living in Donald, 2.5% (37 persons) were Aboriginal and/or Torres Strait Islander people. This is higher than for the state of Victoria (1.0%) but lower than the national average (3.2%). The most common ancestries in Donald were English 43.1%, Australian 39.8%, Scottish 13.2%, Irish 13.2% and German 3.6%. 87.1% of people spoke only English at home.

The most common responses in the census for religion were No Religion 38.9%, Catholic 18.1%, Uniting Church 14.6%, and Anglican 8.9%.

== Sports and activities ==
Donald has a local newspaper called the Buloke Times which is published each Tuesday and Friday, focusing on local events in the Buloke area, with an emphasis on sporting achievements.

The town hosts a 3-day lawn tennis championship on Labour Day weekend. It has an annual show on the Friday and Saturday of the 2nd week of October, and hosts Off Road Racing Australia's annual event the Donald 500 in April.

Donald has a field hockey club, an Australian rules football club called the Donald Royal Blues and a netball club named the Donald Netball Club, all competing in the North Central Football League, the region's major sports league. The horse racing club, the Wimmera Racing Club, schedules around six race meetings a year at Donald including the Donald Cup meeting in November.

Golfers play at the Donald Golf Club on Golf Links Road.

== Attractions ==
The township successfully bid at auction to purchase a metal sculpture of the Nassau Grouper fish, which was used during the 2006 Melbourne Commonwealth Games to represent the country of Belize.

The Bullock's Head is a tree with a growth on it in the shape of a head of a bullock, signposted from the Sunraysia Highway. Though this was badly damaged in a storm, with the top of the tree falling down, it was re-erected using a metal pole and concrete. When the Richardson River floods, the water level has been known to almost reach the Bullock's mouth.

Waterskiing and camping facilities were available at the now dried up Lake Batyo Catyo.

== Transport ==
The Mildura railway line passes through Donald, but only freight services run on it. Donald railway station was closed in 1993, one hundred years after it opened. Buses run through Donald daily from major centres such as Ballarat and Melbourne.

== Climate ==
Donald has a cold semi-arid climate (BSk) with warm to hot, dry summers and cool, cloudy winters, with most of the rain falling in winter and early spring. The town features 82.6 clear days annually.

Climate data for Donald (temperatures 1966–2000; rainfall 1966–2024)
Month	Jan	Feb	Mar	Apr	May	Jun	Jul	Aug	Sep	Oct	Nov	Dec	Year
Record high °C (°F)	44.4 (111.9)	42.4 (108.3)	39.8 (103.6)	35.1 (95.2)	28.0 (82.4)	21.8 (71.2)	23.4 (74.1)	27.4 (81.3)	31.4 (88.5)	35.6 (96.1)	40.4 (104.7)	40.8 (105.4)	44.4 (111.9)
Mean daily maximum °C (°F)	29.6 (85.3)	29.8 (85.6)	26.2 (79.2)	21.7 (71.1)	17.2 (63.0)	14.0 (57.2)	13.3 (55.9)	14.8 (58.6)	17.1 (62.8)	20.8 (69.4)	24.3 (75.7)	27.3 (81.1)	21.3 (70.3)
Mean daily minimum °C (°F)	14.0 (57.2)	14.4 (57.9)	12.3 (54.1)	9.0 (48.2)	6.8 (44.2)	4.6 (40.3)	3.9 (39.0)	4.7 (40.5)	6.1 (43.0)	7.9 (46.2)	9.9 (49.8)	12.3 (54.1)	8.8 (47.8)
Record low °C (°F)	3.1 (37.6)	4.9 (40.8)	3.1 (37.6)	−0.2 (31.6)	−2.6 (27.3)	−4.4 (24.1)	−6.5 (20.3)	−4.5 (23.9)	−3.3 (26.1)	−1.1 (30.0)	1.0 (33.8)	3.6 (38.5)	−6.5 (20.3)
Average precipitation mm (inches)	29.9 (1.18)	21.1 (0.83)	20.7 (0.81)	25.3 (1.00)	37.3 (1.47)	36.3 (1.43)	37.7 (1.48)	41.4 (1.63)	38.9 (1.53)	37.8 (1.49)	31.2 (1.23)	27.5 (1.08)	385.0 (15.16)
Average precipitation days	4.5	3.3	4.6	5.7	9.0	11.1	13.4	12.7	10.3	8.4	6.6	5.7	95.2
Average afternoon relative humidity (%)	32	32	37	44	57	66	65	58	55	44	39	34	47
