= Woomelang-Lascelles Football Club =

Names
- Full name: Woomelang-Lascelles Football Club
- Nickname: Cats

Club details
- Founded: 1951; 75 years ago
- Dissolved: 2015
- Colours
- Competition: Mallee Football League
- Premierships: 1957, 1960, 1968, 1971, 1988, 1993, 2013 (7)
- Ground: Woomelang Recreation Reserve (capacity: 5,000)

Uniforms
Home

Other information
- Official website: Woomelang-Lascelles FNC

The Woomelang-Lascelles Football Club was an Australian rules football club based in Woomelang, Victoria. With its neighbouring township Lascelles, Woomelang formed a merged football team in 1951 that initially competed in the Southern Mallee Football League, from 1951 to 1996, then played in the Mallee Football League from 1997 until the league folded at the end of the 2015 season. The Cats won a senior football premiership in 2013.

== History ==
The Woomelang-Lascelles Football Club (WLFC) was formed in 1951 when neighbouring townships merged to form the one football club and competed in the Southern Mallee Football League, from 1951 to 1996, then played in the Mallee Football League (Victoria) from 1997 until the league folded at the end of the 2015 season from the recommendation of the AFL - North West Structural Review Committee

WLFC did consider playing in the Golden Rivers Football League in 2016, but the vast travel factor was a major reason why the club decided to fold at the end of the 2015 season.

== Football Premierships ==
Seniors

- Southern Mallee Football League
  - 1957, 1960, 1968, 1971, 1988 & 1993
- Mallee Football League (Victoria)
  - 2013

Reserves

- Mallee Football League (Victoria)
  - 2001

== League Best & Fairest ==
Mallee Football League (Victoria)

Seniors

- Russ Gravestocks Medal
  - 2013 - Trent Donnan: 18 votes
  - 2015 - Trent Donnan: 17 votes

Reserves

- Hook Brain Medal
  - 2013 - Matthew Symes: 16 votes

Thirds / Under 16's

- Bryant Barry Medal
  - 2009 - Trent Donnan: 30 votes
  - 2011 - Brodie Adcock: 39 votes

== Club honour board ==
Officer Bearers
Senior & Reserves Football
Stan Donnan Senior Football Best & Fairest Award

Season	President	Secretary	Senior Coach	1sts B&F	2nds B&F
1951	H Cox	P Gale	R Gregor		
1952	E A Barbary	A Mercer	Tom Arklay	P Bett	
1953	T Purdie	G May	N Hiskens		
1954	T Purdie	G May	R Bett		
1955	H Pohnler	A Anderson	A Lewis		
1956	T Purdie &	A Anderson	J Foott	A Roberts	
	H Ackland				
1957	H Cox	K Odgers	D Wright		
1958	P Barbary	K Odgers	D Wright	B Gale	
1959	J Cossens	N Jenkins	K McLean	T Cox	R Williams
1960	J Cossens	N Jenkins	K McLean	T Cox	A Wilkins
1961	J Cossens	N Jenkins	K McLean	T Cox	B Pohnler
1962	J Cossens	N Jenkins	K Reither	K McLean	W Murphy
1963	D Doran	N Jenkins	J Doran	A Roberts	G Duthie
1964	D Doran	M Holmes	J Doran	A Roberts	L Blythman
1965	D Doran	N Jenkins	I Hinks	L Knights	N Anderson
1966	D Doran	N Jenkins	J Simpson	D Simpson	S Mitchell
1967	D Doran	F Fry	I Ryan	A Roberts	G Wright
1968	D Doran	F Fry	I Ryan	L Knights	R Pratt
1969	B Pohnler	R Watson	G Rowan	T Cox	R Pratt
1970	B Pohnler	R Watson	A Roberts	D Simpson	R Stannard
1971	B Pohnler	R Watson	A Ryan &	S Mitchell	M Rogers
			J Simpson		
1972	L Knights	H Ackland	R Doran	R Gregor	K McDowall
1973	L Knights	I Michael	R Doran	R Doran	W Neville
1974	B Pohnler	B Kelly	R Doran	J Ackland	W Neville
1975	L Knights	K French	P Robins	R Doran	K Rickard
1976	L Knights	H Ackland	R Loft	J Ackland	K McDowall
1977	F Primmer	G Lewis	P Robins	J Ackland	G Symes
1978	F Primmer	V Kelly	G Hatcher	P Robins	J Conheady
1979	L Knights	H Ackland	R Dixon &	J Ackland	K Rickard
			M Robertson		
1980	L Knights	H Ackland	P Scarrott	J Ackland	K Rickard
1981	R Doran	H Ackland	C Symes	P Scarrott	G White
1982	R Doran	J Hibberd	L Eastman	R Stannard	D Wright
1983	R Doran	J Hibberd	L Eastman	L Eastman	A McClelland
1984	S Donnan	G Wright	L Eastman	R Morrish	A McNamara
1985	S Donnan	G Wright	N Blandthorn	R Stannard	G Kelly
1986	J Simpson	Colin Barber	C Barbary	R Stannard	M Jansen
1987	J Simpson	C Barber	C Barbary	C Barbary	C Poulton
1988	J Simpson	C Barber	R Pearce	K Jolly	C Poulton
1989	N Mott	C Barber	P Cody	P Cody	C Barber
1990	N Mott	C Barber	P Cody	A Donnan	P Mitchell
1991	C Symes	C Barber	D Solly	A Donnan	D Duggan
1992	C Symes	C Barber	T Doran	W Mott	C Barber
1993	D Poulton	C Barber	T Doran	A Donnan	C Barber
1994	D Poulton	C Barber	T Doran	B Hogan	C Barber
1995	T McPhee	C Barber	R Boswood &	W Mott	C Barber
			P Robins		
1996	T McPhee	C Barber	G Kerr	M McPhee	C Barber
1997	K Bett	D Price	G Kerr	C Robins	I Hulland
1998	K Bett	D Price	B Walters	S Hullard	C Barber
1999	W Shannon	C Barber	A Donavan &	S Hullard	L Doran
			B Doran		
2000	W Shannon	C Barber	B Doran	N Hullard	D Mott
2001	K Bett	C Barber	B Cooper	B Cooper	A Hulland
2002	K Bett	C Barber	B Cooper	B Cooper	A Hulland
2003	D Mott	C Barber	C Robins	C Robins	A Hulland
2004	D Mott	C Barber	C Robins	M Dedini	R Russell
2005	A Donnan	C Barber	C Robins	M Dedini	B Gould
2006	A Donnan	C Barber	C Robins	M Dedini	D Bailey
2007	T Dedini	C Barber	B Hogan	R Hogan	A Hulland
2008	D Adcock	C Barber	B Hogan	R Free	A Hulland
2009	D Adcock	C Barber	T Beasy	J Donnan	A Hulland
2010	A Donnan	C Barber	D Quinn	T Donnan	A Hulland
2011	A Donnan	C Barber	D Quinn	A Foott	M Symes
2012	T McClelland	C Barber	J Kruger &	A Lonergan	H Wooding
			A Lonergan		
2013	T McClelland	C Barber	J Kruger &	C McMahon	H Wooding
			A Lonergan		
2014	S Michael	C Barber	A Foott	J Shannahan	H Wooding
2015	S Michael	C Barber	J Davies &	T Donnan	D Murray
			J Lonergan		
2016					Club folded after '15.
Season	President	Secretary	Senior Coach	1sts B&F	2nds B&F
