= Northern Mallee Football League =

Australian rules football league

The Northern Mallee Football League (NMFL) was an Australian rules football formed in 1979 from the merging of the now defunct Tyrrell Football League with the Mallee Football League

== History ==
The Northern Mallee Football League (NMFL) was an Australian rules football formed in 1979 from the merging of the Tyrrell Football League with the Mallee Football League (not to be confused with the later version nor the South Australian league of the same name).

The competition finished after the 1996 season when it was announced that the Tempy-Gorya-Patchewallock Football Club and the Ouyen Rovers would merge in early 1997, which would leave the NMFL with only four clubs. As a result, the NMFL merged with the Southern Mallee Football League to form the Mallee Football League.

The league featured three grades in the Australian rules football competition, being First-Grade, Reserve-Grade and Under 16s.

== Clubs ==
=== Final clubs ===
Club	Colours	Nickname	Home Ground	Former League	Est.	Years in NMFL	NMFL Premierships		Fate
Club	Colours	Nickname	Home Ground	Former League	Est.	Years in NMFL	Total	Years	Fate
Manangatang		Saints	Manangatang Rec. Reserve, Manangatang	TFL	1900s	1979-1996	3	1989, 1994, 1996	Formed Mallee FL in 1997
Ouyen Rovers		Rovers	Blackburn Park, Ouyen	–	1982	1982-1996	5	1985, 1986, 1987, 1990, 1993	Merged with T-G-P to form Ouyen United in Mallee FL in 1997
Sea Lake-Nandaly		Seagulls	Sea Lake Rec. Reserve, Sea Lake	–	1994	1994-1996	1	1995	Formed Mallee FL in 1997
Tempy-Gorya-Patchewollock (T-G-P)		Tigers	Tempy Memorial Park, Tempy and Patchewollock Recreation Reserve, Patchewollock	–	1971	1979-1996	4	1980, 1981, 1983, 1984	Merged with Ouyen Rovers to form Ouyen United in Mallee FL in 1997
Walpeup-Underbool		Roos	Underbool Rec. Reserve, Underbool	–	1982	1982-1996	0	-	Formed Mallee FL in 1997

=== Former clubs ===
Club	Colours	Nickname	Home Ground	Former League	Est.	Years in NMFL	NMFL Premierships		Fate
Club	Colours	Nickname	Home Ground	Former League	Est.	Years in NMFL	Total	Years	Fate
Kiamal		Magpies		MFL	1919	1979-1981	0	-	Merged with Tiega to form Ouyen Rovers in 1982
Nandaly		Bombers	Nandaly Rec. Reserve, Nandaly	TFL	1919	1979-1993	1	1979	Merged with Sea Lake to form Sea Lake-Nandaly in 1994
Ouyen		Demons	Blackburn Park, Ouyen	SFNL	1937	1983-1984	0	-	Folded in 1984
Sea Lake		Seagulls	Sea Lake Rec. Reserve, Sea Lake	TFL	1894	1979-1993	4	1982, 1988, 1991, 1992	Merged with Nandaly in 1994 to form Sea Lake-Nandaly
Tiega		Tigers	Blackburn Park, Ouyen	MFL	1910s	1979-1981	0	-	Merged with Kiamal to form Ouyen Rovers in 1982
Underbool		Roos	Underbool Rec. Reserve, Underbool	MFL	1910s	1979-1981	0	-	Merged with Walpeup to form Walpeup-Underbool in 1982
Walpeup		Roos	Walpeup Rec. Reserve, Walpeup	MFL	1910s	1979-1981	0	-	Merged with Underbool to form Walpeup-Underbool in 1982

== Football Premierships ==
Seniors

Year	Premier	Score	Runner-up	Score
1979	Nandaly	18.20.128	Manangatang	14.13.97
1980	T-G-P	21.22.148	Manangatang	12.13.85
1981	T-G-P	21.13.139	Manangatang	18.9.127
1982	Sea Lake	21.24.150	T-G-P	20-9-129
1983	T-G-P	22.11.143	Manangatang	13.7.85
1984	T-G-P	19.12.126	Sea Lake	18.13.121
1985	Ouyen Rovers	23.12.150	Sea Lake	17.11.113
1986	Ouyen Rovers	15.20.110	Manangatang	15.15.105
1987	Ouyen Rovers	11.13.79	Sea Lake	8.7.55
1988	Sea Lake	13.6.84	T-G-P	6.9.45
1989	Manangatang	12.17.89	Walpeup-Underbool	11.08
1990	Ouyen Rovers	16.13.109	Manangatang	14.19.103
1991	Sea Lake	16.12.108	Manangatang	12.12.84
1992	Sea Lake	16.18.114	Ouyen Rovers	7.9.51
1993	Ouyen Rovers	13.12.90	Sea Lake	12.11.83
1994	Manangatang	19.22.136	Walpeup-Underbool	11.10.76
1995	Sea Lake-Nandaly	13.18.96	T-G-P	11.10.76
1996	Manangatang	9.12.66	Walpeup-Underbool	8.16.64

== See also ==
- Southern Mallee Football League
- Mallee Football League (Victoria)
- North Central Football League
