= Tom Arklay =

Australian rules footballer, born 1914

Thomas Donovan Arklay

Personal information
- Born: 26 March 1914
- Died: 11 January 2002 (aged 87)
- Original team: North Geelong
- Height: 179 cm (5 ft 10 in)
- Weight: 83 kg (183 lb)

Playing career^{1}
Years	Club	Games (Goals)
1933–1941, 1944	Geelong	137 (45)

Coaching career
Years	Club	Games (W–L–D)
1944	Geelong	18 (1–17–0)
- ^{1} Playing statistics correct to the end of 1944.

Career highlights
- VFL premiership player: 1937; Geelong FC - Best & Fairest: 1938 & 1940

Tom Arklay (26 March 1914 – 11 January 2002) was an Australian rules footballer who played for Geelong in the Victorian Football League (VFL).

== Career ==
A Geelong local, Arklay made his senior debut 1933. He was a tough and physical player, mostly used on the half back flank and also as a ruck rover. In both 1938 and 1940 he won Geelong's best and fairest and was a premiership player in 1937.

Arklay left the club after the 1941 VFL season which he had spent as captain. In 1944 however he made a comeback, as captain-coach before retiring at the season's end.

Arklay later coached in rural Victoria for a number of years at - Casterton, Lascelles, Warracknabeal, Woomelang-Lascelles and King Valley, winning four premierships during that time - Casterton - 1945, Lascelles - 1946 and 1949 and Warracknabeal in 1947.

Arklay was still playing club and representative football in 1951 for Woomelang-Lascelles in the Southern Mallee Football League.
