= Tom Keough =

Australian rules footballer

Personal information
- Full name: Thomas Keough
- Born: 10 October 1991 (age 35); Pinnaroo, South Australia
- Original team: Pinnaroo Supa Roos
- Height: 194 cm (6 ft 4 in)
- Weight: 91 kg (201 lb)
- Other occupation: PE Teacher

Playing career
Years	Club	Games (Goals)
2012–2015 & 2017-2022	West Adelaide	141 (96)
2016	Gold Coast Suns Reserves	14 (1)
Total		155 (97)

Representative team honours
Years	Team	Games (Goals)
2015-2022	South Australia	3 (0)
Total		3 (0)

Career highlights
- 2015 Fos Williams Medal

Tom Keough (born 10 October 1991) is an Australian rules football player. He captained South Australian National Football League (SANFL) club West Adelaide in 2018.

Keough grew up in the Murray Mallee and played junior football for the Pinnaroo Supa Roos in the Mallee Football League. He was recruited to the West Adelaide Football Club in the South Australian National Football League (SANFL) and played in its 2015 premiership side. In the 2016 AFL rookie draft he was selected by the Gold Coast Suns. He returned to West Adelaide after the 2016 season.

Keough won the Fos Williams Medal as the best South Australian player in their Inter-State match in 2015 against Western Australia.
