= Rodney Maynard =

Australian rules footballer (born 1966)

Personal information
- Born: 21 September 1966 (age 60); Lameroo, South Australia
- Original team: Norwood
- Height: 188 cm (6 ft 2 in)
- Weight: 80 kg (176 lb)

Playing career^{1}
Years	Club	Games (Goals)
1991–1995	Adelaide	81 (24)
- ^{1} Playing statistics correct to the end of 1995.

Career highlights
- South Australian Football Hall of Fame (2015 inductee); Adelaide Team of the Decade - Interchange

Rodney "Rocket" Maynard (born 21 September 1966) is a former professional Australian rules footballer who played for the Adelaide Football Club in the Australian Football League (AFL)

== Early life ==
Maynard grew up in Lameroo, South Australia, he played football for Lameroo North Football Club then attended Prince Alfred College wherein 1984 he was recruited by the Norwood Football Club.

== SANFL career ==
Rodney Maynard joined his older brother Brenton at Norwood who played in the under 19s Premiership and won the best and fairest. Maynard made his SANFL debut on 17 March 1984 v Glenelg at age 17, however mainly played in the Reserves for the next three seasons, and was a member of the 1985 and 1986 Reserve Premiership teams alongside his brother Brenton.

In 1987 Maynard became a regular member of the SANFL team, winning the most improved player award. The following season he continued his fine form winning the club leading goalkicker and was runner-up in the Norwood Best and Fairest. Rodney had his finest season in 1989 playing centre half forward and centre half back, winning the club best & fairest and being selected for the state squad.

For seven seasons Rodney and Brenton drove two hours to Adelaide from the family farm at Lameroo to train on Thursdays. They would return to the farm that night, work on the Friday and come back to Adelaide in time to play on the Saturday. Brenton retired from the SANFL in 1989.

== AFL career ==
At age 24 Maynard played in the Adelaide Crows' inaugural AFL game in 1991, in which they defeated that season's eventual premiers Hawthorn by 86 points at Football Park in Adelaide. Maynard played in the back pocket and, remarkably, kicked three goals. Maynard would play in all of Adelaide's games in 1991 and 1992, mainly playing centre half back. Rodney won the first-ever Best Team Man award for Adelaide in 1991. He played 16 games in 1993 including Adelaide's loss to Essendon in the preliminary final and was the first Crow to play 50 games for the club. 1994 saw a change of role for Maynard as he played 16 games. However 1995 would be Maynard's final season in the AFL as injuries restricted him to only five games and he retired at 29 to return home to the family farm.

He was later chosen on the interchange bench in the club's official 'Team of the Decade'. Between 1991 and 1995, Rodney Maynard played 81 games and kicked 24 goals for the Crows.

After leaving the AFL in 1996, Maynard returned to Lameroo where he played 206 senior games for the Lameroo Hawks between 1996 and 2011 (as Lameroo North and South merged in 1991) and went on to win six Mail Medals for the best and fairest in the Mallee Football League in 1996, 1997, 1998, 2001, 2002 and 2004. Rodney won the final Mail Medal at age 37. Remarkably his brother Brenton won 3 Mail medals in previous years to Rodney in 1991, 1993 and 1994. During his time playing for Lameroo he won ten best and fairests and seven premierships. During this time he also coached Lameroo, represented the South Australian Country team in the Australian Country Championships several times, and was captain-coach of the side twice.

Maynard regularly competes in the West End Slowdown which consists of former Crows and Port Adelaide players in facing off in a game for charity.

In 2015, Maynard was inducted into the South Australian Football Hall of Fame.
