= Greg Kennedy (footballer) =

Australian rules footballer

Personal information
- Born: 28 July 1949 (age 77)
- Original teams: Wycheproof / Narraport, NCFL, Eaglehawk (Bendigo FL)
- Debut: Round 1, 1972, Carlton vs. Fitzroy, at Princes Park
- Height: 187 cm (6 ft 2 in)
- Weight: 76 kg (168 lb)

Playing career^{1}
Years	Club	Games (Goals)
1972–1975	Carlton	48 (143)
- ^{1} Playing statistics correct to the end of 1975.

Career highlights
- 1972 Best First Year Player Award; Carlton Leading Goalkicker 1972

Greg Kennedy (born 28 July 1949) is a former Australian rules footballer who played in the early 1970s with VFL club Carlton.

Kennedy was initially from the Wychproof/Narraport Football Club, where he was the North Central Football League's leading goal kicker in 1966 (87 goals), 1967 (121) and 1968 (48). Kennedy also won the North Central Football League's best and fairest award, the Feeney Medal in 1967.

Kennedy was recruited from Eaglehawk in the Bendigo Football League, after kicking 125 goals in 1970, then in 1971, kicking 152 goals and also winning the league best and fairest award, the Michelsen Medal.

Kennedy made his VFL debut with Carlton in round 1, 1972, at the age of 22. Playing at full forward or on a half-forward flank, Kennedy ended his first year as Carlton's leading goalkicker with a tally of 79—including a near-club record of 12.3 in round 21 against Hawthorn—winning the club's Best First Year Player award.

The following season, Kennedy suffered a back injury which affected his performance, and he managed only 30 goals, the same injury keeping him on the sidelines for the entirety of the 1974 season.

He returned to play in 1975 but failed to recapture his best form and was delisted the same year, having kicked 143 goals for the Blues in 48 games, an average of just under 3 goals per game.
