= Tyrrell Football League =

Australian football league

The Tyrell Football League (TFL) was an Australian rules football and competition that finished in 1978 with clubs based in the Mallee region of Victoria, Australia. The league featured three grades in the Australian rules football competition, being First-Grade, Reserve-Grade and Under 16s (starting in 1966).

== History ==
The Tyrrell Football League was formed in 1946 and competed through to 1978 until the league folded and all clubs joined new and neighbouring leagues in the area.

== Clubs ==
=== Final clubs ===
Club	Colours	Nickname	Home Ground	Former League	Est.	Years in comp	TFL Senior Premierships		Fate
Club	Colours	Nickname	Home Ground	Former League	Est.	Years in comp	Total	Years	Fate
Berri-Culgoa		Tigers	Berriwillock Rec. Reserve, Berriwillock; Culgoa Rec. Reserve, Culgoa	–	1975	1975-1978	0	-	Moved to Southern Mallee FL in 1979
Manangatang		Saints	Manangatang Rec. Reserve, Manangatang	MFL	1900s	1958-1978	2	1963, 1967	Moved to Northern Mallee FL in 1979
Nandaly		Bombers	Nandaly Rec. Reserve, Nandaly	MFL	1919	1952-1978	1	1974	Moved to Northern Mallee FL in 1979
Nullawil		Maroons	Nullawil Rec. Reserve, Nullawil	WDFA	1900s	1946-1978	9	1964, 1966, 1971, 1972, 1973, 1975, 1976, 1977, 1978	Moved to Southern Mallee FL in 1979
Sea Lake		Seagulls	Sea Lake Rec. Reserve, Sea Lake	WDFA	1894	1946-1978	7	1946, 1947, 1959, 1965, 1968, 1969, 1970	Moved to Northern Mallee FL in 1979
Ultima		Roos	Ultima Rec. Reserve, Ultima	MMFL	1900s	1955-1978	0	-	Moved to Kerang and District FL in 1979

=== Former clubs ===
Club	Colours	Nickname	Home Ground	Former League	Est.	Years in comp	TFL Senior Premierships		Fate
Club	Colours	Nickname	Home Ground	Former League	Est.	Years in comp	Total	Years	Fate
Berriwillock		Bullfrogs	Berriwillock Rec. Reserve, Berriwillock	WDFA	1890s	1946-1974	7	1954, 1955, 1956, 1957, 1958, 1960, 1961	Merged with Culgoa to form Berri-Culgoa in 1975
Birchip		Swans	Birchip Recreation Reserve, Birchip	WDFA		1946-1952	1	1950	Moved to North Central FL in 1953
Chinkapook		Magpies		MFL	1913	1958-1970	0	-	Absorbed by Manangatang in 1970
Culgoa			Culgoa Recreation Reserve, Culgoa	WDFA	1890s	1946-1975	1	1953	Merged with Berriwillock to form Berri-Culgoa in 1975
Curyo				NCFL	1890s	1946-1957	0	-	Folded
Narraport			Narraport Recreation Reserve, Narraport	WDFA	1890s	1946-1952	2	1949, 1952	Moved to North Central FL in 1953
Wycheproof		Demons	Wycheproof Recreation Reserve, Wycheproof	WDFA	1890s	1946-1951	2	1948, 1951	Moved to North Central FL in 1952

== Premierships ==
Year	Premier	Score	Runner-up	Score
1946	Sea Lake	17-14-116	Narraport	15-15-105
1947	Sea Lake	12-10-82	Narraport	10-15-75
1948	Wycheproof			
1949	Narraport	13-11-89	Sea Lake	4-9-33
1950	Birchip	8-13-61	Narraport	9-6-60
1951	Wycheproof	10-12-72	Narraport	10-8-68
1952	Narraport	14-11-95	Nullawil	7-8-50
1953	Culgoa	9-10-64	Berriwillock	6-5-41
1954	Berriwillock	8-12-60	Culgoa	8-7-55
1955	Berriwillock	11-8-74	Nullawil	5-14-44
1956	Berriwillock	10-14-74	Nandaly	9-8-62
1957	Berriwillock	14-11-95	Nullawil	7-8-50
1958	Berriwillock	14-14-98	Manangatang	6-13-49
1959	Sea Lake	14-9-93	Nandaly	7-11-53
1960	Berriwillock	16-10-106	Nandaly	8-11-59
1961	Berriwillock	9-9-63	Nullawil	9-8-62
1962	Culgoa	8-10-58	Nullawil	6-10-46
1963	Manangatang	9-6-60	Nullawil	7-11-53
1964	Nullawil	7-14-56	Chinkapook	8-7-55
1965	Sea Lake	7-8-50	Berriwillock	6-6-42
1966	Nullawil	14-9-93	Sea Lake	9-6-60
1967	Manangatang	11-13-79	Nandaly	10-15-75
1968	Sea Lake	10-16-76	Culgoa	9-9-63
1969	Sea Lake	7-13-55	Nullawil	8-2-50
1970	Sea Lake	10-16-76	Nullawil	6-9-45
1971	Nullawil	8-6-54	Sea Lake	2-14-26
1972	Nullawil	13-11-89	Ultima	7-10-52
1973	Nullawil	19-10-124	Nandaly	13-12-90
1974	Nandaly	18-10-118	Nullawil	17-14-116
1975	Nullawil	14-15-99	Ultima	14-14-98
1976	Nullawil	21-12-138	Berri-Culgoa	9-9-63
1977	Nullawil	14-13-97	Berri-Culgoa	8-14-62
1978	Nullawil	12-23-95	Nandaly	6-14-50
