= North Central Football League =

Australian rules football league in North Central Victoria, Australia

North Central Football Netball League
- Current season, competition or edition: 2026
- Formerly: North Central District Football League (1926 - 29)
- Sport: Australian rules football Netball
- Founded: 1930; 96 years ago
- First season: 1930
- CEO: Tom King
- President: Tim Lockhart
- No. of teams: 8
- Country: Australia
- Most recent champion: Wedderburn (2026)
- Sponsor: Goldacres
- Website: https://www.northcentralfl.com

The North Central Football League is an Australian rules football league based in North Central Victoria, Australia.

== History ==
At a Delegate's meeting in April 1930 of the North Central District Football League, the following club's had withdrew from the competition - Birchip, Donald, St Arnaud and Watchem and it was decided to abandoned the NCDFL for 1930.

The North Central Football League was then formed around May 1930 from the following clubs - Birchip, Donald, St. Arnaud and Watchem.

In 1937, the North Central FL decided on playing their competition on the Wednesday afternoon half holiday day, which meant that Birchip and Woomelang clubs were forced to apply for admission to the Ouyen Football League. In 1937, Birchip ended up playing in the Wychproof Football league.

The North Central FL ended up with a three team competition in 1937 consisting of - Donald, St Arnaud and Watchem.

In 1938, Woomelang FC returned to the North Central FL after playing in the FL in 1937.

In 1940, the North Central FL comprised the following clubs - Charlton, Donald, Laen-Carron, St Arnaud, Watchem and Wooroonook.

Early Local Football History

In May 1908, the North Western Football Association was formed, comprising Charlton, Glenloth, Wooroonook and Wycheproof.

In September 1913, the North Western Football Association defeated the Maryborough Football Association by 10 points at Princes Park, Maryborough.

In April 1915, the Birchip, Donald, St. Arnaud and Watchem Football Club's formed the North Western District Football Association. Then in early May 1915, Donald pulled out, due to their restricted radius imposed on them by the association. St. Arnaud then joined the Gower East Football Association.

In September 1926, the premiers of both the North Western Football Association (St Arnaud) and Wycheproof District Football Association (Charlton) played each other. Scores were - Charlton: 13.8 - 86 d St Arnaud: 5.5 - 35.

In 1929, the North Central District Football League comprised the following clubs - Birchip, Donald, St Arnaud, Watchem and Woomelang.

Some of the previous leagues in the area were the -

- Birchip Football Association (as it was last called until it disbanded in 1919),
- North-Western Football Association (1910–1912)
- Donald & District Football Association (1913)
- North-Western Football Association (1914)
- North-Western District Football Association (1915–1925), and the
- North Central District Football League (1926–1929)

== Clubs ==
=== Current ===
Locations of the current NCFL clubs. The orange pogs represent the Calder United Lions, who have multiple home grounds in Wycheproof and Nullawil.

Club	Colours	Nickname	Home Grounds	Former League	Est.	Years in NCFL	NCFL Senior Premierships	
Club	Colours	Nickname	Home Grounds	Former League	Est.	Years in NCFL	Total	Years
Birchip-Watchem		Bulls	George Cartwright Oval, Birchip	–	1997	1997–	2	2001, 2022
Boort		Magpies	Boort Park, Boort	GRFL	1889	1951–	3	1954, 1982, 2008
Calder United Lions		Lions	Nullawil Recreation Reserve, Nullawil and Wycheproof Recreation Reserve, Wycheproof	–	2024	2025–	1	2025
Charlton		Navies	Charlton Park, Charlton	KFL	1880	1940–	13	1940, 1946, 1947, 1950, 1966, 1973, 1974, 1989, 1990, 2003, 2005, 2009, 2016
Donald		Royal Blues	Donald Recreation Reserve, Donald	NCDFL, DDFA	1882	1930, 1932–	13	1936, 1937, 1939, 1949, 1963, 1979, 1980, 1987, 1992, 1993, 2002, 2004, 2006
Sea Lake-Nandaly Tigers		Tigers	Sea Lake Recreation Reserve, Sea Lake	MFL	2003	2016–	3	2019, 2023, 2024
St Arnaud	(1980s-2011) (2012-)	Saints	Lord Nelson Park, St Arnaud	NCDFL, DDFA	1877	1930, 1932–	11	1930, 1932, 1933, 1934, 1948, 1958, 1978, 1988, 1998, 1999, 2015
Wedderburn	(?-2010) (2011-)	Redbacks	Donaldson Park, Wedderburn	KFL	1882	1950–	9	1951, 1968, 1970, 2007, 2011, 2012, 2013, 2014, 2026

== Former clubs ==
Club	Colours	Nickname	Home Ground	Former League	Est.	Years in NCFL	NCFL Senior Premierships		Fate
Club	Colours	Nickname	Home Ground	Former League	Est.	Years in NCFL	Total	Years	Fate
Birchip		Swans	Birchip Recreation Reserve, Birchip	NCDFL, SMFL, TFL		1930, 1934-1936, 1953-1996	2	1986, 1994	Recess in 1931. Played in Southern Mallee FL in 1932-33. Moved to Wycheproof DFA in 1937. Merged with Watchem-Corack to form Birchip-Watchem following 1996 season
Cope Cope				KKFL	c.1870s	1945-1949	0	-	Merged with Laen-Litchfield to form Laen-Cope Cope-Litchfield following 1950 season
Corack			Corack Recreation Reserve, Corack East	DJFA, BJFL	1893	1933, 1945	0	-	Moved to Birchip JFL in 1934. Merged with Watchem following 1945 season to form Watchem-Corack
Curyo				BJFL	c.1890s	1938-1939	0	-	Moved to Tyrrell FL in 1946
Laen				–	c.1919	1933-1934	0	-	Merged with Litchfield to form Laen-Litchfield following 1934 season
Laen-Cope Cope-Litchfield			Litchfield Recreation Reserve, Litchfield	–	1949	1951-1954	0	-	Absorbed by Donald in 1954
Laen-Litchfield			Litchfield Recreation Reserve, Litchfield	–	1934	1934, 1940, 1945-1949	1	1935	Played merged with Watchem between 1935-39. Merged with Cope Cope to form Laen-Cope Cope-Litchfield following 1950 season
Leitchville Gunbower		Bombers	Leitchville Recreation Reserve, Leitchville and Gunbower Recreation Reserve, Gunbower	NEFL	1995	1997-2001	0	-	Moved to Central Murray FNL following 2001 season
Narraport			Narraport Recreation Reserve, Narraport	TFL	c.1890s	1953-1963	1	1956	Merged with Wycheproof to form Wycheproof-Narraport following 1963 season
Nullawil		Maroons	Nullawil Recreation Reserve, Nullawil	GRFL	c.1900s	2023–2024	0	-	Merged with Wycheproof-Narraport to form Calder United Lions following 2024 season
Swanwater				DDFA	c.1900s	1932	0	-	Folded
Watchem			Watchem Recreation Reserve, Watchem	NCDFL, BJFL	c.1880s	1930, 1932-1934, 1940	0	-	Recess in 1931. Played merged with Laen-Litchfield between 1935-39. Merged with Corack following 1945 season to form Watchem-Corack
Watchem-Corack		Panthers	Watchem Recreation Reserve, Watchem	–	1946	1946-1996	6	1953, 1960, 1961, 1962, 1969, 1971	Merged with Birchip to form Birchip-Watchem following 1996 season
Watchem-Litchfield				–	1935	1935-1939	1	1938	De-merged into Watchem and Laen-Litchfield following 1939 season
Woomelang			Woomelang Recreation Reserve, Woomelang	MFA, SMFL	c.1900s	1935-1936, 1938-1939	1	1935	Played in Southern Mallee FL in 1937. Moved to Southern Mallee FA in 1940
Wooroonook (Jeffcott 1932-34)		Lakers	Jeffcott Recreation Reserve, Jeffcott	DDFA	c.1870s	1932-1934, 1940-1947	0	-	Recess 1935-37. Re-formed in Wycheproof & District FL in 1938. Folded after 1947 season
Wycheproof		Demons	Wycheproof Recreation Reserve, Wycheproof	TFL	c.1890s	1952-1963	2	1955, 1957	Merged with Narraport to form Wycheproof-Narraport following 1963 season
Wycheproof-Narraport		Demons	Wycheproof Recreation Reserve, Wycheproof	–	1964	1964–2024	19	1964, 1965, 1967, 1972, 1975, 1976, 1977, 1981, 1983, 1984, 1985, 1991, 1995, 1996, 1997, 2000, 2010, 2017, 2018	Merged with Nullawil to form Calder United Lions following 2024 season

== List of NCFL premiers ==
- 1930 St Arnaud
- 1931 No NCFL competition
- 1932 St Arnaud
- 1933 St Arnaud
- 1934 St Arnaud
- 1935 Woomelang
- 1936 Donald
- 1937 Donald
- 1938 Watchem-Litchfield
- 1939 Donald
- 1940 Charlton
- 1941 – 1944 > WWII
- 1945 Laen-Litchfield
- 1946 Charlton
- 1947 Charlton
- 1948 St Arnaud
- 1949 Donald
- 1950 Charlton
- 1951 Wedderburn
- 1952 Wycheproof
- 1953 Watchem-Corack
- 1954 Boort
- 1955 Wycheproof
- 1956 Narraport
- 1957 Wycheproof
- 1958 St Arnaud
- 1959 Birchip
- 1960 Watchem-Corack
- 1961 Watchem-Corack
- 1962 Watchem-Corack
- 1963 Donald
- 1964 Wycheproof-Narraport
- 1965 Wycheproof-Narraport
- 1966 Charlton
- 1967 Wycheproof-Narraport
- 1968 Wedderburn
- 1969 Watchem-Corack
- 1970 Wedderburn
- 1971 Watchem-Corack
- 1972 Wycheproof-Narraport
- 1973 Charlton
- 1974 Charlton
- 1975 Wycheproof-Narraport
- 1976 Wycheproof-Narraport
- 1977 Wycheproof-Narraport
- 1978 St Arnaud
- 1979 Donald
- 1980 Donald
- 1981 Wycheproof-Narraport
- 1982 Boort
- 1983 Wycheproof-Narraport
- 1984 Wycheproof-Narraport
- 1985 Wycheproof-Narraport
- 1986 Birchip
- 1987 Donald
- 1988 St Arnaud
- 1989 Charlton
- 1990 Charlton
- 1991 Wycheproof-Narraport
- 1992 Donald
- 1993 Donald
- 1994 Birchip
- 1995 Wycheproof-Narraport
- 1996 Wycheproof-Narraport
- 1997 Wycheproof-Narraport
- 1998 St Arnaud
- 1999 St Arnaud
- 2000 Wycheproof-Narraport
- 2001 Birchip-Watchem
- 2002 Donald
- 2003 Charlton
- 2004 Donald
- 2005 Charlton
- 2006 Donald
- 2007 Wedderburn
- 2008 Boort
- 2009 Charlton
- 2010 Wycheproof-Narraport
- 2011 Wedderburn
- 2012 Wedderburn
- 2013 Wedderburn
- 2014 Wedderburn
- 2015 St Arnaud
- 2016 Charlton
- 2017 Wycheproof-Narraport
- 2018 Wycheproof-Narraport
- 2019 Sea Lake-Nandaly Tigers
- 2020 NCFL in recess > COVID-19 pandemic
- 2021 No Finals series > COVID-19 pandemic
- 2022 Birchip-Watchem
- 2023 Sea Lake-Nandaly Tigers
- 2024 Sea Lake-Nandaly Tigers
- 2025 Calder United Lions
- 2026 Wedderburn

== Football Grand Finals ==
North Central FL - Seniors

Year	Premier	G	B	Pts	Runner Up	G	B	Pts
1930	St. Arnaud	11	7	73	Birchip	7	4	46
1931	NCFL in recess							
1932	St. Arnaud	14	10	94	Jeffcott	9	16	70
1933	St. Arnaud	15	12	102	Laen	9	13	67
1934	St. Arnaud	12	15	87	Birchip	12	5	77
1935	Woomelang	12	11	83	Birchip	8	9	65
1936	Donald	11	8	74	Woomelang	5	11	41
1937	Donald	13	14	92	Watchem	8	14	62
1938	Watchem - Litchfield	12	11	83	Woomelang	7	16	58
1939	Donald (defeated)				Woomelang	by	25	pts
1940	Charlton	15	16	106	Laen-Litchfield	5	13	43
1941-44	NCFL in recess >				WW2			
1945	Laen-Litchfield	9	10	64	Corack	5	14	44
1946	Charlton	16	16	112	Laen-Litchfield	12	11	83
1947	Charlton	11	16	82	Laen-Litchfield	11	8	74
1948	St Arnaud	13	10	88	Watchem-Corack	12	9	81
1949	Donald	9	13	67	Watchem-Corack	6	13	49
1950	Charlton	18	10	118	Watchem-Corack	11	15	81
1951	Wedderburn	9	12	66	Watchem-Corack	8	7	55
1952	Wycheproof	15	17	107	Donald	4	9	33
1953	Watchem-Corack	8	11	59	Narraport	7	3	45
1954	Boort	8	8	56	Wycheproof	6	17	53
1955	Wycheproof	9	19	73	Birchip	10	11	71
1956	Narraport	14	8	92	Charlton	7	6	48
1957	Wycheproof	7	12	54	St Arnaud	5	9	39
1958	St Arnaud	12	13	85	Narraport	8	13	61
1959	Birchip	10	10	70	Watchem-Corack	6	6	42
1960	Watchem-Corack	7	11	53	Birchip	5	5	35
1961	Watchem-Corack	14	5	89	Charlton	10	9	69
1962	Watchem-Corack	15	11	101	Birchip	7	14	56
1963	Donald	5	17	47	Birchip	6	5	41
1964	Wycheproof-Narraport	6	11	47	Watchem-Corack	3	6	24
1965	Wycheproof-Narraport	17	15	117	Donald	15	10	100
1966	Charlton	12	8	80	Wycheproof-Narraport	11	6	72
1967	Wycheproof-Narraport	18	19	127	Watchem-Corack	8	9	57
1968	Wedderburn	16	10	106	Watchem-Corack	14	11	95
1969	Watchem-Corack	13	10	88	Birchip	11	18	84
1970	Wedderburn	17	10	112	Charlton	1	5	11
1971	Watchem-Corack	8	8	56	Charlton	3	9	27
1972	Wycheproof-Narraport	19	9	123	St Arnaud	11	14	80
1973; Replay	Charlton; Charlton	17; 12	8; 13	110; 85	St Arnaud; St Arnaud	15; 9	20; 11	110; 65
1974	Charlton	9	9	63	Wedderburn	4	7	31
1975	Wycheproof-Narraport	13	9	87	Charlton	10	12	72
1976	Wycheproof-Narraport	15	11	101	St Arnaud	10	15	75
1977	Wycheproof-Narraport	15	11	101	St Arnaud	10	9	69
1978	St Arnaud	16	11	107	Donald	9	19	73
1979	Donald	20	14	134	Charlton	5	9	39
1980	Donald	13	13	91	Wycheproof-Narraport	11	12	78
1981	Wycheproof-Narraport	20	14	134	Boort	14	13	97
1982	Boort	26	14	170	Wycheproof-Narraport	10	22	82
1983	Wycheproof-Narraport	15	17	107	Donald	13	17	95
1984	Wycheproof-Narraport	16	14	110	Birchip	15	6	96
1985	Wycheproof-Narraport	20	17	137	Charlton	10	7	67
1986	Birchip	18	12	120	Wycheproof-Narraport	16	11	107
1987	Donald	19	12	126	St Arnaud	12	15	87
1988	St Arnaud	21	7	133	Charlton	13	9	87
1989	Charlton	14	15	99	Boort	7	7	49
1990	Charlton	9	16	70	St Arnaud	9	15	69
1991	Wycheproof-Narraport	12	10	82	St Arnaud	9	14	68
1992	Donald	13	13	91	St Arnaud	12	9	81
1993	Donald	14	14	98	Wycheproof-Narraport	12	13	85
1994	Birchip	11	11	77	Wycheproof-Narraport	6	15	51
1995	Wycheproof-Narraport	9	5	59	Birchip	5	4	34
1996	Wycheproof-Narraport	10	11	71	Donald	8	7	55
1997	Wycheproof-Narraport	15	5	95	Donald	14	10	94
1998	St Arnaud	13	19	97	Donald	6	8	44
1999	St Arnaud	14	11	95	Wycheproof-Narraport	12	9	81
2000	Wycheproof-Narraport	16	15	111	Wedderburn	2	12	24
2001	Birchip-Watchem	18	17	125	Wedderburn	11	12	78
2002	Donald	15	22	112	Birchip-Watchem	11	5	71
2003	Charlton	15	10	100	St Arnaud	7	12	54
2004	Donald	16	9	105	Wycheproof-Narraport	13	11	89
2005	Charlton	13	11	89	Wycheproof-Narraport	8	7	55
2006	Donald	17	19	121	Boort	12	14	86
2007	Wedderburn	20	15	135	Charlton	11	15	81
2008	Boort	11	15	81	Wedderburn	10	6	66
2009	Charlton	11	11	77	Donald	9	11	65
2010	Wycheproof-Narraport	13	9	87	Boort	6	7	43
2011	Wedderburn	18	16	124	Wycheproof-Narraport	17	13	115
2012	Wedderburn	16	12	108	St Arnaud	15	17	107
2013	Wedderburn	12	13	85	Charlton	10	13	73
2014	Wedderburn	11	17	83	Charlton	12	10	82
2015	St Arnaud	13	8	86	Charlton	11	12	78
2016	Charlton	10	10	70	Wycheproof-Narraport	9	9	63
2017	Wycheproof-Narraport	9	9	63	Birchip-Watchem	7	9	51
2018	Wycheproof-Narraport	8	8	56	Birchip-Watchem	2	10	22
2019	Sea Lake-Nandaly Tigers	10	13	73	Birchip-Watchem	8	6	54
2022	Birchip-Watchem	10	18	78	Donald	8	9	57
2023	Sea Lake-Nandaly Tigers	10	16	76	Nullawil	9	8	62
2024	Sea Lake-Nandaly Tigers	7	5	47	Birchip-Watchem	4	10	34
2025	Calder United	11	14	80	Birchip-Watchem	10	10	70
2026	Wedderburn	12	10	82	Sea Lake-Nandaly Tigers	8	8	56

== Grand Final Results: 1900 to 1929 ==
Below is a list of grand final results from former local North Central Victorian football associations / leagues, who all played an important part in providing local football competitions prior to the formation of the North Central Football League in 1930.

Wooroonook Football Association

- 1900 - ?

North Western Football Association

- 1900 - Donald
- 1905 - Charlton: 3.9 - 27 d Buckrabanyule: 2.3 - 15
- 1908 - Charlton: 80 d Wooroonook: 26 (Barry's Trophy)
- 1909 - Charlton: 6.15 - 51 d Woosang: 3.2 - 20
- 1910 - Charlton: 2.12 - 24 d Wooroonook: 1.5 - 11

Birchip Football Association

- 1909 - 1st: St. Arnaud: 2nd: Birchip:

St. Arnaud Football Association

- 1910 - 1st: St. Arnaud: 2nd: Birchip

Woomelang District Football Association

- 1911 - Woomelang
- 1912 -

Watchem Football Association

- 1911 -
- 1912 -
- 1913 - 1st: Birchip: 2nd: Watchem

Wycheproof and Charlton Football Association

- 1904 - 1st: Corak
- 1911 - 1st: Corak: 2nd Charlton
- 1912 - Narraport: 6.13 - 49 d Charlton: 2.7 - 19
- 1913 -
- 1914 - Charlton: 4.14 - 38 d Narraport: 2.12 - 24

Boort Football Association

- 1913 - Marmal: 2.5 - 17 d Boort: 1.4 - 10

Donald District Football Association

- 1914 - Birchip: 14.16 - 100 d Donald: 4.13 - 37

North Western Football Association

- 1915 - 1918: NWFA in recess > World War 2

Birchip District Football Association

- 1918 - Whirily: 7.8 - 50 d Watchem: 2.5 - 17

North Western Football Association

- 1919 - St. Arnaud: 4.10 - 34 d Donald: 4.9 - 33 (Protest)
- 1919 - St. Arnaud: d Donald: (Grand Final Reply)

North Western District Football Association

- 1920 - Donald:
- 1921 - Watchem: d St. Arnaud:
- 1922 - Watchem: 10.20 - 80 d Donald: 4.9 - 33
- 1923 - St. Arnaud: 6.8 - 44 d Watchem: 4.6 - 30
- 1924 - Donald: 10.8 - 68 d Birchip: 4.6 - 30
- 1925 - Birchip: 15.12 - 102 d Donald: 10.7 - 67

North Central District Football League

- 1926 - St. Arnaud: 8.17 - 65 d Donald: 5.7 - 37
- 1927 - St. Arnaud: 8.15 - 63 d Watchem: 5.8 - 38
- 1928 - Birchip: 9.13 - 67 d Woomelang: 9.11 - 65
- 1929 - Birchip: 15.19 - 109 d Woomelang: 12.16 - 88

Wycheproof & District Football Association

- 1909 - Corack: 4.5 - 29 drew with Wycheproof: 3.11 - 29
- 1912 - Narraport: 6.13 - 49 d Charlton: 2.7 - 19
- 1913 -
- 1914 - Charlton: 4.14 - 38 d Narraport: 2.12 - 24
- 1915 - 1918: WDFA in recess > World War One
- 1919 - Wycheproof: 4.10 - 34 d Narraport: 3.7 - 25
- 1920 - Wycheproof: 6.10 - 46 d Charlton: 6.4 - 40

Nullawili / Narraport Football Association

- 1921 - Narraport: 9.17 - 71 d Whirily: 5.6 - 36

Northern District Football Association

- 1921 - Wycheproof: 6.10 - 46 d Sea Lake: 6.5 - 35
- 1922 - Charlton
- 1923 - Woosang: 6.11 - 47 d Wycheproof: 6.8 - 44
- 1924 - Narraport: 8.13 - 61 d Woosang: 6.10 - 46
- 1925 - Narraport: 9.5 - 53 d Wycheproof: 4.7 - 31
- 1926 - Charlton: 8.9 - 57 d Narraport: 7.5 - 47

Gladstone Football Association

- 1925 - Boort:

Northern Mallee Football Association

- 1927 - Narraport: 6.13 - 49 d Nullawil: 6.8 - 44
- 1928 - Nullawil: 7.5 - 47 d Charlton: 5.7 - 37
- 1929 - Wycheproof: 12.21 - 93 d Nullawil: 7.4 - 46
- 1930 - Wycheproof: 13.12 - 90 d Culgoa: 10.4 - 64

Wycheproof / Sea Lake Football Association

- 1931 - Nullawil: 4.8 - 32 d Wycheproof: 2.8 - 20

Wycheproof Football Association

- 1932 - Wycheproof: 5.9 - 39 d Narraport: 4.12 - 36
- 1933 - Wycheproof
- 1934 - Narraport
- 1935 - Narraport
- 1936 - Charlton: 18.7 - 115 d Narraport: 9.13 - 67
- 1937 - Nullawil
- 1938 - Culgoa
- 1939 - Narraport
- 1940 - Narraport

Best & Fairest Award

- 1937 - Ray Allan - Narraport FC

== Senior Football Best and Fairest / Feeny Medal Winners ==
When football resumed in the North Central FL after World War Two, Mr. J.J. Feeny, himself a former renown local footballer, made available a best and fairest award each year from 1947 onwards.

Feeny began his local football career in 1897, at the age of 17 and he played until he was in his mid forties. Feeny played for a number of local clubs including - Goorac, Sutherland, Saltwater, Donald, Traynors Island, Watchem, Coonooer Bridge, St. Arnaud and Cope Cope. Some of these clubs played football on a Wednesday afternoon and / or a Saturday, so at times he played twice a week.

After his retirement from playing, Feeny spent 33 years on the North Central FL Independent Tribunal.

Seniors

North Central FL Senior Football - Best & Fairest
J J Feeney Medal
Year	Winner	Club	Votes
1947	Gerry Melican	Laen / Litchfield	?
1948	Wally Shearer	Donald	
1949	Jim Brennan	Watchem / Corack	
1950	Jim Brennan	Watchem / Corack	
1951	Wally Shearer	Donald	
1952	Alex Denney	Wycheproof	34
1953	Jim Brennan	Watchem / Corack	23
1954	Ron Lunn	Birchip	28
1955	Max Evans	Birchip	15
1956	Arthur Lacey	Birchip	27
1957	W. Bill Gordon	Wycheproof	28
1958	Mancel Giddings	Narraport	25
1959	Frank Fitzpatrick	Boort	24
1960	Mancel Giddings	Narraport	27
1961	Mancel Giddings	Narraport	22
1962	Ewan Gardner	Watchem / Corack	21
1963	Daryl Campbell	Watchem / Corack	16
1964	John Chisholm	St. Arnaud	19
1965	Ian Fithall	St. Arnaud	18
1966	Mancel Giddings	Wycheproof/Narraport	27
1967	Greg Kennedy	Wycheproof/Narraport	25
1968	Daryl Campbell	Watchem / Corack	19
1969	Brendan Keane	Charlton	28
1970	Tom Speedie	Charlton	25
1971	Tom Speedie	Charlton	22
1972	Ken Lowden	Watchem / Corack	22
1973	John Boyle	Watchem / Corack	20
1974	John Boyle	Watchem / Corack	24
1975	Jim Jess	St Arnaud	31
1976	Hugh Delahunty	Donald	17
1977	Robert White	Wycheproof/Narraport	21
1978	Mark Hannan	Donald	22
1979	Peter Moore	Donald	19
1980	Frank Scarce	St Arnaud	23
1981	Tony Southcombe	Boort	19
1982	John Bond &	Birchip	12
	Warren Coles	Wycheproof/Narraport	12
1983	Gary Young	Donald	30
1984	Keiran Lourey &	Wycheproof/Narraport	19
	Rod Wardle	Birchip	19
1985	Tony Doran &	Birchip	17
	Steve McDougall &	Charlton	17
	Neville Lyons	Donald	17
1986	Shane Palmer	Birchip	19
1987	Glenn Westerland	Donald	18
1988	Heath Campbell	Watchem / Corack	20
1989	Peter Hynes	Boort	24
1990	Chris Wall	St Arnaud	21
1991	Chris Wall	St Arnaud	19
1992	Paul Brooks	Donald	29
1993	Peter Bish	Wycheproof/Narraport	23
1994	Robbie Lee	Birchip	18
1995	Tony Graham	Wycheproof/Narraport	22
1996	Peter Bish	Wycheproof/Narraport	22
1997	Tony Cashin	Donald	20
1998	Dean Bennett	Birchip / Watchem	25
1999	Josh Martin &	Wycheproof/Narraport	23
	Simon McLean	St Arnaud	23
2000	Mark O'Meara	Charlton	26
2001	Shayne Ward	Wedderburn	18
2002	Scott Baxter	Birchip / Watchem	21
2003	Danny O'Bree	Wycheproof/Narraport	28
2004	Glenn Wlikins	Donald	21
2005	James Coatsworth	Wycheproof/Narraport	24
2006	Rick Andrews	Charlton	25
2007	James Scambler	Birchip / Watchem	16
2008	Brett Jeffrey	Boort	17
2009	Glenn Handley &	Wedderburn	17
	Michael Henningsen	Boort	17
2010	Travis Ruyg &	Donald	20
	Aaron Walklate	Boort	20
2011	Ben DeAraugo	Wedderburn	27
2012	James McNamee &	St Arnaud	20
	Brett Strange	Wedderburn	20
2013	Corey Jones	Wycheproof/Narraport	24
2014	Mark Lloyd	Wedderburn	19
2015	Luke Fisher	Donald	20
2016	James Orr	Boort	29
2017	Ryan O'Sullivan	Sea Lake Nandaly	33
2018	Lochlan Sirett	Birchip/Watchem	20
2019	Mitchell Gleeson	Charlton	19
2020	NCFL in recess >	COVID-19	
2021	Jordan Hargreaves	Wedderburn	16
2022	Ross Young	Donald	25
2023	Trent Donnan &	Sea Lake Nandaly	20
	Nicholas Rippon	Birchip/Watchem	20
2024	Wade Donnan	Sea Lake Nandaly	25
2025	Wade Donnan &	Sea Lake Nandaly	24
	Hamish Hosking	Birchip/Watchem	24
2026	Hamish Lockhart	Wedderburn	25

Reserves

North Central FL RESERVES Football - Best & Fairest
James & Jenny Goldsmith Trophy
Year	Winner	Club	Votes
1948	Bernie Hartney	Watchem / Corack	?
1949	Bernie Hartney	Watchem / Corack	
1950	Kevin Porter	Donald	
1951	Alec Shearer	Donald	
1952	Alan Dunstan	L C L	
1953	D English &	Watchem / Corack	13
	Ian Ashton	St Arnaud	13
1954	Ron Bell	Birchip	10
1955	R Sutton	Boort	23
1956	L Jones	Boort	14
1957	J Mayberry	Boort	14
1958	K May	St Arnaud	25
1959	J Storey	Wycheproof	
1960	J Postlewaite	St Arnaud	16
1961	Alan Matheson	Narraport	
1962	Eddie Kick	Donald	20
1963	C Andrews	Weddernburn	19
1964	J Connolly	Weddernburn	
1965	J Mayberry	Boort	12
1966	K Matheson	Wycheproof/Narraport	
1967	W Kelly	Wycheproof/Narraport	12
1968	I Jackson	Weddernburn	
1969	H Mitchell	Birchip	13
1970	K Connolly	Birchip	13
1971	Doug Mitchell	Birchip	13
1972	Graeme Johnson	St Arnaud	13
1973	T Davis	Boort	
1974	Peter Vallance &	Watchem / Corack	16
	L Mulquiny*	Charlton	(16)
1975	Ross Loats	Donald	19
1976	Frank Scare	St Arnaud	15
1977	Barry Andrews	Weddernburn	15
1978	Kelvin Adamson	Donald	
1979	Les Wilson	Birchip	23
1980	Kevin Ward	St Arnaud	16
1981	Greg McNally	St Arnaud	18
1982	Colin Franklin	Donald	14
1983	Shane O'Donnell &	Charlton	11
	Royce Ross	Weddenburn	11
	Carron Bourke	Watchem / Corack	11
1984	Bruce Campbell &	Watchem / Corack	
	John Lovell	St Arnaud	
1985	Rod Stevenson	Charlton	17
1986	Bruce Campbell	Watchem / Corack	
1987	Bruce Campbell	Watchem / Corack	22
1988	Tony Stevenson	Donald	14
1989	Tom Turner	Wycheproof/Narraport	17
1990	Trevor Bell	Birchip	15
1991	Danny Arnold	Wycheproof/Narraport	23
1992	Trevor Bell	Birchip	23
1993	Tony Meade	St Arnaud	20
1994	Kerrin Griffths	Donald	22
1995	Stephen Boyle	Boort	28
1996	Stephen Boyle	Boort	22
1997	David Weaver	Boort	17
1998	Tim Hewitt	St Arnaud	24
1999	Rob Grundy &	Leitchville/Gunbower	24
	Julian Story	Charlton	24
2000	Alan Bish	Wycheproof/Narraport	26
2001	Mark O'Shea	Leitchville/Gunbower	20
2002	Andrew Harris	Charlton	13
2003	Alan Fish	Wycheproof/Narraport	21
2004	Alan Last	Wedderburn	16
2005	Tim Lockhart	Wedderburn	20
2006	Andrew Lee	Birchip/Watchem	17
2007	Jim Sheahan	Birchip/Watchem	21
2008	Heath Griffith	Donald	15
2009	Leigh Funcke	Donald	15
2010	Geoff Berry	Donald	18
2011	Chris Duffy	Wycheproof/Narraport	22
2012	Wayne Maxted	Boort	20
2013	Beau Knight	St. Arnaud	22
2014	Zach Notting	St. Arnaud	18
2015	Andrew Brett	Wedderburn	24
2016	Dion Hawkes &	Donald	19
	Nathan Gooding	Boort	19
2017	Andrew Brett	Wedderburn	26
2018	Andrew Brett	Wedderburn	22
2019	Andrew Brett	Wedderburn	19
2020	NCFL in recess >	COVID-19	
2021	Jack Ryan	Birchip-Watchem	16
2022	Jack Ryan	Birchip-Watchem	22
2023	Callan Noonan	Sea Lake Nandaly	18
2024	Connor Michael	Sea Lake Nandaly	18
2025	Alex Cockerell &	Boort	15
	Brody Weir	Sea Lake Nandaly	15
2026	Kurtis Torney	St Arnaud	25

- 1974 - L Mulquiny (Charlton) lost on a countback, but has never received a retrospective medal.

== Senior Leading Goal Kicking Winners ==
Seniors - The Richmond Trophy

The Richmond trophy was donated by former Watchem player, Alf Richmond in 1947, who was the Watchem / Corack FC Vice President and club delegate.

	North Central FNL: Senior Football Leading & Century Goalkickers				
Year	Winner	Club	Season Goals	Goals in finals	Total Goals
1930					
1931	NCFL in recess				
1932					
1933					
1934					
1935					
1936					
1937					
1938					
1939					
1940					
1941-44	NCFL in recess >	WW2			
1945					
1946					
1947	Frank Alexander	St Arnaud	65	9	74
1948	Frank Alexander	St Arnaud	68	10	78
1949	Con Fanning	Charlton	78		
1950	Con Fanning	Charlton	70	14	84
1951	Geoff Richmond	Watchem / Corack	40		
1952	M Morrison	Wycheproof	40		
1953	Geoff Richmond	Watchem / Corack	80		
1954	Wally Shearer	Donald	64		
1955	Ron Lunn	Birchip	46		
1956	W Miller	Wycheproof	60		
1957	W Bartholomew	St Arnaud	49		
1958	W Miller	Wycheproof	50		
1959	Jim Brennan	Watchem / Corack	87	6	93
1960	Dick O'Bree	Wycheproof	65	5	70
1961	Roger Brennan	Watchem / Corack	44	2	46
1962	John Billings	St. Arnaud	46		
1963	Jock Schofield	Birchip	38		
1964	D Clarke	Donald	53		
1965	Ken Mitchell	Watchem / Corack	45		
1966	Greg Kennedy	Wycheproof / Narraport	77	10	87
1967	Greg Kennedy	Wycheproof / Narraport	113	8	121
1968	Greg Kennedy	Wycheproof / Narraport	48		
1969	Ian Fithall	St. Arnaud	47		
1970	Ross Jackson	Wedderburn	56	1	57
1971	Murray Gilmour	Donald	56	4	60
1972	Ron Best	Charlton	72	8	79
1973	Alan Jackson	Wedderburn	61	2	63
1974	Alan Jackson	Wedderburn	71	3	74
1975	Alan Jackson	Wedderburn	76	6	82
1976	Alan Jackson	Wedderburn	89	10	99
1977	Warren Coles	Wycheproof / Narraport	103	12	115
1978	Brian Livingstone	Boort	86		
1979	Robert Earl	Wedderburn	87		
1980	Alan Jackson	Wedderburn	132	1	133
1981	Ron Best	Boort	86	14	100
1982	Brian Livingstone	Boort	85	13	98
1983	Greg Anderson	Wycheproof / Narraport	107	4	111
1984	Kerin Lourey	Wycheproof / Narraport	72	18	90
1985	Tony Doran	Birchip	108	2	110
1986	Oscar Aertssen	Donald	99	10	109
1987	Tony Doran	Birchip	98		
1988	John Goode	St Arnaud	56	1	57
1989	Mick McCarthy	St Arnaud	65	5	70
1990	Bill Keane	Wycheproof / Narraport	60	3	63
1991	Luke Taylor	Wycheproof / Narraport	77	14	91
1992	Paul Morgan	Donald	123	5	128
1993	Paul Morgan	Donald	89	15	104
1994	Paul Morgan	Donald	84	8	92
1995	Paul Morgan	Donald	112	8	120
1996	Tony Keane	Wycheproof / Narraport	78	4	82
1997	Lee Hall	Wedderburn	69		
1998	Bruce Hando	St Arnaud	117	2	119
1999	Stewart Egan	St Arnaud	85	6	91
2000	Kristian Shevlin	Wedderburn	102	7	109
2001	Kristian Shevlin	Wedderburn	118	7	125
2002	Phil Bramley	Charlton	88		
2003	Phil Bramley	Charlton	103	14	117
2004	Phil Bramley	Charlton	98	12	110
2005	David McCormick	Wedderburn	76	5	81
2006	Cliff Ryan	Birchip Watchem	114	10	124
2007	Darren Stenhouse	Wedderburn	97	8	105
2008	Mark Perryman	Boort	109	19	128
2009	Jarrod Tyler	Birchip Watchem	90	7	97
2010	Mark Perryman	Boort	87	12	99
2011	Sam Barnes	Wedderburn	83	12	95
2012	Sam Barnes	Wedderburn	90	13	103
2013	Sam Barnes	Wedderburn	59	23	82
2014	Sam Barnes	Wedderburn	94	6	100
2015	Seamus Young	Donald	66	8	74
2016	Corey Jones	Wycheproof / Narraport	76	15	91
2017	Corey Jones	Wycheproof / Narraport	68	3	71
2018	Stephen Paulke	Birchip Watchem	63	5	68
2019	Billy McInness	Sea Lake Nandaly	65	6	71
2020	NCFL in recess >	COVID-19			
2021	Billy McInness	Sea Lake Nandaly	28		28
2022	Billy McInness	Sea Lake Nandaly	58	4	62
2023	Sam Dunstan	Donald	89	4	93
2024	Ben Edwards	Birchip Watchem	97	5	102
2025	Ben Edwards	Birchip Watchem	123	8	131
2026	Max Cahoon	Sea Lake Nandaly	72	3	75
Year	Winner	Club	Season Goals	Goals in finals	Total Goals

== Season Ladders ==
=== 2004 Ladder ===
North Central FL	Wins	Byes	Losses	Draws	For	Against	%	Pts	Final	Team	G	B	Pts	Team	G	B	Pts
Wycheproof-Narraport	15	3	1	0	1700	1119	151.92%	60	1st Semi	Charlton	18	11	119	Boort	11	15	81
Donald	10	3	6	0	1532	1404	109.12%	40	2nd Semi	Wycheproof-Narraport	16	10	106	Donald	9	9	63
Boort	8	3	8	0	1343	1370	98.03%	32	Preliminary	Donald	8	6	54	Charlton	6	7	43
Charlton	7	3	8	1	1458	1242	117.39%	30	Grand	Donald	16	9	105	Wycheproof-Narraport	13	11	89
Wedderburn	7	3	9	0	1483	1632	90.87%	28									
Birchip-Watchem	5	3	11	0	1259	1471	85.59%	20									
St Arnaud	3	3	12	1	1239	1776	69.76%	14									

=== 2005 Ladder ===
North Central FL	Wins	Byes	Losses	Draws	For	Against	%	Pts	Final	Team	G	B	Pts	Team	G	B	Pts
Wedderburn	12	3	4	0	1794	1303	137.68%	48	1st Semi	Wycheproof-Narraport	18	8	116	Donald	7	13	55
Charlton	12	3	4	0	1737	1293	134.34%	48	2nd Semi	Charlton	17	13	115	Wedderburn	17	11	113
Wycheproof-Narraport	11	3	5	0	1425	1227	116.14%	44	Preliminary	Wycheproof-Narraport	11	11	77	Wedderburn	9	9	63
Donald	9	3	7	0	1536	1474	104.21%	36	Grand	Charlton	13	11	89	Wycheproof-Narraport	8	7	55
Boort	7	3	9	0	1365	1535	88.93%	28									
St Arnaud	4	3	12	0	1382	1787	77.34%	16									
Birchip-Watchem	1	3	15	0	1113	1733	64.22%	4									

=== 2006 Ladder ===
North Central FL	Wins	Byes	Losses	Draws	For	Against	%	Pts	Final	Team	G	B	Pts	Team	G	B	Pts
Boort	14	3	2	0	2245	1132	198.32%	56	1st Semi	Birchip-Watchem	13	22	100	Charlton	9	5	59
Donald	13	3	3	0	2359	1250	188.72%	52	2nd Semi	Boort	10	13	73	Donald	8	12	60
Birchip-Watchem	9	3	6	0	1999	1199	166.72%	36	Preliminary	Donald	19	18	132	Birchip-Watchem	12	12	84
Charlton	9	3	5	0	1779	1490	119.40%	36	Grand	Donald	17	19	121	Boort	12	14	86
Wedderburn	5	3	10	0	1447	1762	82.12%	20									
St Arnaud	3	3	13	0	1208	2448	49.35%	12									
Wycheproof-Narraport	1	3	15	0	814	2600	31.31%	4									

=== 2007 Ladder ===
North Central FL	Wins	Byes	Losses	Draws	For	Against	%	Pts	Final	Team	G	B	Pts	Team	G	B	Pts
Wedderburn	13	3	3	0	1697	1259	134.79%	52	1st Semi	Charlton	19	14	128	St Arnaud	11	10	76
Birchip-Watchem	11	3	5	0	1785	1345	132.71%	44	2nd Semi	Wedderburn	14	17	101	Birchip-Watchem	7	17	59
Charlton	10	3	6	0	1573	1211	129.89%	40	Preliminary	Charlton	17	14	116	Birchip-Watchem	14	14	98
St Arnaud	8	3	8	0	1564	1698	92.11%	32	Grand	Wedderburn	20	15	135	Charlton	11	15	81
Boort	7	3	9	0	1569	1322	118.68%	28									
Wycheproof-Narraport	4	3	12	0	1102	1856	59.38%	16									
Donald	3	3	13	0	1092	1691	64.58%	12									

=== 2008 Ladder ===
North Central FL	Wins	Byes	Losses	Draws	For	Against	%	Pts	Final	Team	G	B	Pts	Team	G	B	Pts
Boort	15	3	1	0	1980	975	203.08%	60	1st Semi	Birchip-Watchem	11	8	74	Charlton	7	7	49
Wedderburn	13	3	3	0	1889	1113	169.72%	52	2nd Semi	Wedderburn	19	9	123	Boort	13	16	94
Birchip-Watchem	11	3	5	0	1835	1128	162.68%	44	Preliminary	Boort	18	14	122	Birchip-Watchem	11	11	77
Charlton	8	3	8	0	1207	1391	86.77%	32	Grand	Boort	11	15	81	Wedderburn	10	6	66
St Arnaud	5	3	11	0	1542	2120	72.74%	20									
Donald	2	3	14	0	1137	2033	55.93%	8									
Wycheproof-Narraport	2	3	14	0	951	1781	53.40%	8									

=== 2009 Ladder ===
North Central FL	Wins	Byes	Losses	Draws	For	Against	%	Pts	Final	Team	G	B	Pts	Team	G	B	Pts
Donald	12	3	4	0	1720	1109	155.09%	48	1st Semi	Charlton	13	15	93	Boort	7	6	48
Birchip-Watchem	12	3	4	0	1524	1082	140.85%	48	2nd Semi	Donald	12	18	90	Birchip-Watchem	11	10	76
Charlton	11	3	5	0	1626	1153	141.02%	44	Preliminary	Charlton	13	12	90	Birchip-Watchem	12	11	83
Boort	10	3	6	0	1411	1177	119.88%	40	Grand	Donald	9	11	65	Charlton	11	11	77
Wycheproof-Narraport	7	3	9	0	1232	1292	95.36%	28									
Wedderburn	4	3	12	0	1013	1614	62.76%	16									
St Arnaud	0	3	16	0	1041	2140	48.64%	0									

=== 2010 Ladder ===
North Central FL	Wins	Byes	Losses	Draws	For	Against	%	Pts	Final	Team	G	B	Pts	Team	G	B	Pts
Donald	13	3	3	0	1605	1181	135.90%	52	1st Semi	Boort	16	12	108	Wedderburn	9	6	60
Wycheproof-Narraport	12	3	4	0	1734	1318	131.56%	48	2nd Semi	Wycheproof-Narraport	13	5	83	Donald	7	9	51
Boort	11	3	5	0	1589	1117	142.26%	44	Preliminary	Boort	13	16	94	Donald	11	11	77
Wedderburn	11	3	5	0	1609	1165	138.11%	44	Grand	Wycheproof-Narraport	13	9	87	Boort	6	7	43
Charlton	4	3	12	0	939	1780	52.75%	16									
St Arnaud	3	3	13	0	1444	1880	76.81%	12									
Birchip-Watchem	2	3	14	0	1082	1561	69.31%	8									

=== 2011 Ladder ===
North Central FL	Wins	Byes	Losses	Draws	For	Against	%	Pts	Final	Team	G	B	Pts	Team	G	B	Pts
Wedderburn	13	3	3	0	2192	1095	200.18%	52	1st Semi	Boort	16	14	110	Donald	11	12	78
Wycheproof-Narraport	13	3	3	0	1769	1088	162.59%	52	2nd Semi	Wedderburn	17	8	110	Wycheproof-Narraport	13	15	93
Boort	12	3	3	1	1485	1131	131.30%	50	Preliminary	Wycheproof-Narraport	21	15	141	Boort	9	7	61
Donald	7	3	8	1	1511	1338	112.93%	30	Grand	Wedderburn	18	16	124	Wycheproof-Narraport	17	13	115
Charlton	7	3	9	0	1310	1473	88.93%	28									
Birchip-Watchem	2	3	12	2	876	1524	57.48%	12									
St Arnaud	0	3	16	0	962	2456	39.17%	0									

=== 2012 Ladder ===
North Central FL	Wins	Byes	Losses	Draws	For	Against	%	Pts	Final	Team	G	B	Pts	Team	G	B	Pts
Wedderburn	15	0	1	0	2104	1088	193.38%	60	1st Semi	St Arnaud	16	13	109	Wycheproof-Narraport	16	8	104
Birchip-Watchem	9	0	7	0	1443	1323	109.07%	36	2nd Semi	Wedderburn	22	15	147	Birchip-Watchem	8	11	59
Wycheproof-Narraport	9	0	7	0	1434	1434	100.00%	36	Preliminary	St Arnaud	18	5	113	Birchip-Watchem	9	12	66
St Arnaud	8	0	8	0	1564	1570	99.62%	32	Grand	Wedderburn	16	12	108	St Arnaud	15	17	107
Charlton	8	0	8	0	1158	1416	81.78%	32									
Donald	5	0	11	0	1203	1549	77.66%	20									
Boort	2	0	14	0	1094	1620	67.53%	8									

=== 2013 Ladder ===
North Central FL	Wins	Byes	Losses	Draws	For	Against	%	Pts	Final	Team	G	B	Pts	Team	G	B	Pts
Charlton	12	0	4	0	1640	860	190.70%	48	1st Semi	Wedderburn	15	19	109	Wycheproof-Narraport	11	7	73
St Arnaud	11	0	5	0	1624	1179	137.74%	44	2nd Semi	Charlton	17	16	118	St Arnaud	13	12	90
Wycheproof-Narraport	11	0	5	0	1342	1172	114.51%	44	Preliminary	Wedderburn	23	16	154	St Arnaud	9	11	65
Wedderburn	10	0	5	1	1532	1226	124.96%	42	Grand	Wedderburn	12	13	85	Charlton	10	13	73
Donald	5	0	10	1	1174	1428	82.21%	22									
Boort	5	0	11	0	1069	1438	74.34%	20									
Birchip-Watchem	1	0	15	0	725	1803	40.21%	4									

=== 2014 Ladder ===
North Central FL	Wins	Byes	Losses	Draws	For	Against	%	Pts	Final	Team	G	B	Pts	Team	G	B	Pts
Wedderburn	14	0	2	0	2145	951	225.55%	56	1st Semi	St Arnaud	20	20	140	Birchip-Watchem	6	5	41
Charlton	12	0	4	0	1515	1001	151.35%	48	2nd Semi	Wedderburn	10	14	74	Charlton	4	11	35
St Arnaud	11	0	5	0	1626	1498	108.54%	44	Preliminary	Charlton	10	7	67	St Arnaud	8	12	60
Birchip-Watchem	7	0	8	1	1352	1518	89.06%	30	Grand	Wedderburn	11	17	83	Charlton	12	10	82
Boort	7	0	8	1	1374	1603	85.71%	30									
Wycheproof-Narraport	4	0	12	0	1115	1488	74.93%	16									
Donald	0	0	16	0	933	2001	46.63%	0									

=== 2015 Ladder ===
North Central FL	Wins	Byes	Losses	Draws	For	Against	%	Pts	Final	Team	G	B	Pts	Team	G	B	Pts
St Arnaud	12	0	4	0	1789	1240	144.27%	48	1st Semi	Donald	11	10	76	Birchip-Watchem	10	12	72
Charlton	10	0	6	0	1377	1015	135.67%	40	2nd Semi	Charlton	14	18	102	St Arnaud	8	7	55
Birchip-Watchem	10	0	6	0	1287	979	131.46%	40	Preliminary	St Arnaud	12	17	89	Donald	10	6	66
Donald	10	0	6	0	1357	1033	131.36%	40	Grand	St Arnaud	13	8	86	Charlton	11	12	78
Wycheproof-Narraport	9	0	7	0	1373	1003	136.89%	36									
Wedderburn	5	0	11	0	1042	1314	79.30%	20									
Boort	0	0	16	0	562	2203	25.51%	0									

=== 2016 Ladder ===
North Central FL	Wins	Byes	Losses	Draws	For	Against	%	Pts	Final	Team	G	B	Pts	Team	G	B	Pts
Wycheproof-Narraport	15	0	1	0	1633	1076	151.77%	60	1st Semi	Donald	8	10	58	Birchip-Watchem	9	9	63
Charlton	12	0	4	0	1530	1142	133.98%	48	2nd Semi	Charlton	8	13	61	Wycheproof-Narraport	7	8	50
Donald	11	0	5	0	1393	1040	133.94%	44	Preliminary	Wycheproof-Narraport	17	6	108	Birchip-Watchem	9	5	59
Birchip-Watchem	9	0	7	0	1267	1133	111.83%	36	Grand	Charlton	10	10	70	Wycheproof-Narraport	9	9	63
Boort	7	0	9	0	1111	1324	83.91%	28									
Sealake-Nandaly Tigers	5	0	10	1	1250	1316	94.98%	22									
St Arnaud	3	0	12	1	1140	1725	66.09%	14									
Wedderburn	1	0	15	0	912	1480	61.62%	4									

=== 2017 Ladder ===
North Central FL	Wins	Losses	Draws	For	Against	%	Pts	Final	Team	G	B	Pts	Team	G	B	Pts
Wycheproof-Narraport	14	1	1	1836	764	240.31%	58	1st Semi Final	Sea Lake Nandaly	18	14	122	Boort	6	6	42
Birchip-Watchem	11	5	0	1294	875	147.89%	44	2nd Semi Final	Birchip-Watchem	15	8	98	Wycheproof-Narraport	8	8	56
Sea Lake Nandaly	11	5	0	1477	1179	125.28%	44	Preliminary Final	Wycheproof-Narraport	13	11	89	Sea Lake Nandaly	10	8	68
Boort	10	5	1	1143	981	116.51%	42	Grand Final	Wycheproof-Narraport	9	7	61	Birchip-Watchem	7	9	51
Donald	9	7	0	1131	1130	100.08%	36									
Wedderburn	4	12	0	932	1388	67.15%	16									
Charlton	3	13	0	962	1490	64.56%	12									
St. Arnaud	1	15	0	1062	1797	59.10%	4									

=== 2018 Ladder ===
North Central FL	Wins	Losses	Draws	For	Against	%	Pts	Final	Team	G	B	Pts	Team	G	B	Pts
Wycheproof-Narraport	14	2	0	1357	957	141.79%	56	1st Semi Final	Sea Lake Nandaly	12	18	90	Donald	13	9	87
Birchip-Watchem	12	4	0	1625	804	202.11%	48	2nd Semi Final	Wycheproof-Narraport	10	14	74	Birchip-Watchem	8	12	60
Donald	9	7	0	1152	1154	99.83%	36	Preliminary Final	Birchip-Watchem	18	12	120	Sea Lake Nandaly	12	10	82
Sea Lake Nandaly	8	8	0	1218	1154	105.55%	32	Grand Final	Wycheproof-Narraport	8	8	56	Birchip-Watchem	2	10	22
Wedderburn	7	8	1	1262	1289	97.91%	28									
St. Arnaud	6	9	1	1110	1484	74.80%	24									
Charlton	5	11	0	1029	1344	76.56%	20									
Boort	2	14	0	1058	1552	68.17%	8									

=== 2019 Ladder ===
North Central FL	Wins	Losses	Draws	For	Against	%	Pts	Final	Team	G	B	Pts	Team	G	B	Pts
Sea Lake Nandaly	15	1	0	1916	569	336.73%	60	1st Semi Final	Charlton	10	9	69	Donald	6	5	41
Birchip-Watchem	15	1	0	1621	640	253.28%	60	2nd Semi Final	Sea Lake Nandaly	15	10	100	Birchip-Watchem	10	13	73
Charlton	10	6	0	1297	941	137.83%	40	Preliminary Final	Birchip-Watchem	8	4	52	Charlton	3	11	29
Donald	9	7	0	1186	1060	111.89%	36	Grand Final	Sea Lake Nandaly	10	13	73	Birchip-Watchem	8	6	54
Wedderburn	8	8	0	1435	1060	135.38%	32									
St. Arnaud	5	11	0	986	1436	68.66%	20									
Wycheproof-Narraport	2	14	0	741	1690	43.85%	8									
Boort	0	16	0	440	2332	18.87%	0									

=== 2020 Ladder ===
NCFL in Recess - COVID-19 Pandemic

=== 2021 Ladder ===
North Central FL	Wins	Losses	Draws	Abandoned	For	Against	%	Pts	Final	Team	G	B	Pts	Team	G	B	Pts
Sea Lake Nandaly	8	1	0	2	1047	342	306.14%	36	1st Semi Final								
Birchip-Watchem	9	2	0	0	975	500	195.00%	36	2nd Semi Final								
Wedderburn	8	2	1	0	821	583	140.82%	34	Preliminary Final								
Donald	5	4	1	1	755	601	125.62%	24	Grand Final								
Charlton	4	7	0	0	580	852	68.08%	16									
Boort	3	7	0	1	529	822	64.36%	14									
St. Arnaud	2	9	0	0	521	1013	51.43%	8									
Wycheproof-Narraport	1	8	0	2	404	919	43.96%	8									

2021 Season was affected by COVID-19 lockdowns, resulting in a number of rounds and matches being abandoned. Finals eventually cancelled. Sea Lake Nandaly were named as Minor Premiers

=== 2022 Ladder ===
North Central FL	Wins	Losses	Draws	For	Against	%	Pts	Final	Team	G	B	Pts	Team	G	B	Pts
Birchip-Watchem	15	1	0	1762	687	247.48%	60	1st Semi Final	Sea Lake Nandaly	15	11	101	Wedderburn	4	10	34
Donald	14	2	0	1845	725	254.48%	56	2nd Semi Final	Birchip-Watchem	17	8	110	Donald	10	13	73
Sea Lake Nandaly	12	4	0	1944	680	285.89%	48	Preliminary Final	Donald	15	11	101	Sea Lake Nandaly	10	8	68
Wedderburn	10	6	0	1275	1133	112.53%	40	Grand Final	Birchip-Watchem	10	18	78	Donald	8	9	57
Wycheproof-Narraport	5	11	0	987	1289	76.58%	20									
Boort	5	11	0	763	1657	46.05%	20									
St. Arnaud	3	13	0	737	1691	43.58%	12									
Charlton	0	16	0	555	2005	27.68%	0									

=== 2023 Ladder ===
North Central FL	Wins	Losses	Draws	For	Against	%	Pts	Final	Team	G	B	Pts	Team	G	B	Pts
Sea Lake Nandaly	16	0	0	1783	656	271.80%	64	1st Semi Final	Nullawil	13	12	90	Donald	9	8	62
Birchip-Watchem	12	4	0	1621	894	181.32%	48	2nd Semi Final	Sea Lake Nandaly	17	9	111	Birchip-Watchem	10	12	72
Donald	11	5	0	1336	1046	127.72%	44	Preliminary Final	Nullawil	10	8	68	Birchip-Watchem	8	7	55
Nullawil	10	6	0	1418	957	148.17%	40	Grand Final	Sea Lake Nandaly	10	16	76	Nullawil	9	8	62
Wycheproof-Narraport	7	8	1	1003	1202	83.44%	30									
Wedderburn	7	9	0	1332	1251	106.47%	28									
Boort	4	11	1	990	1273	77.77%	18									
Charlton	4	12	0	901	1714	52.57%	16									
St. Arnaud	0	16	0	521	1912	27.25%	0									

=== 2024 Ladder ===
North Central FL	Wins	Losses	Draws	For	Against	%	Pts	Final	Team	G	B	Pts	Team	G	B	Pts
Sea Lake Nandaly	14	2	0	1686	732	230.33%	56	1st Semi Final	Wedderburn	7	13	55	Donald	6	7	43
Birchip-Watchem	13	2	1	1650	830	198.80%	54	2nd Semi Final	Birchip-Watchem	10	15	75	Sea Lake Nandaly	10	13	73
Wedderburn	9	6	1	1210	1016	119.09%	38	Preliminary Final	Sea Lake Nandaly	11	6	72	Wedderburn	5	10	40
Donald	9	6	1	1129	1052	107.32%	38	Grand Final	Sea Lake Nandaly	7	5	47	Birchip-Watchem	4	10	34
Nullawil	9	7	0	1427	1281	111.40%	36									
Boort	7	8	1	1187	1300	91.31%	30									
Wycheproof-Narraport	6	9	1	1070	1211	88.36%	24									
St. Arnaud	2	14	0	656	1554	42.21%	8									
Charlton	0	15	1	620	1659	37.37%	0									

=== 2025 Ladder ===
North Central FL	Wins	Losses	Draws	For	Against	%	Pts	Final	Team	G	B	Pts	Team	G	B	Pts
Birchip-Watchem	16	0	0	2068	645	320.62%	64	1st Semi Final	Sea Lake Nandaly	15	11	101	Boort	7	5	47
Calder United	12	4	0	1874	653	286.98%	48	2nd Semi Final	Birchip Watchem	8	6	54	Calder United	10	5	65
Sea Lake Nandaly	12	4	0	1817	662	274.47%	48	Preliminary Final	Birchip-Watchem	8	17	65	Sea Lake Nandaly	8	7	55
Boort	10	6	0	1539	1065	144.51%	40	Grand Final	Calder United	11	14	80	Birchip-Watchem	10	10	70
Wedderburn	8	8	0	1355	949	142.78%	32									
Charlton	4	12	0	537	1953	27.50%	16									
St Arnaud	2	14	0	640	1775	36.06%	8									
Donald	0	16	0	288	2416	11.92%	0									

=== 2026 Ladder ===
North Central FL	Wins	Losses	Draws	For	Against	%	Pts	Final	Team	G	B	Pts	Team	G	B	Pts
Wedderburn	15	1	0	1702	763	223.07%	60	1st Semi Final	Calder United	5	8	38	Birchip-Watchem	16	13	109
Sea Lake Nandaly	14	2	0	1896	876	216.44%	56	2nd Semi Final	Wedderburn	8	9	57	Sea Lake Nandaly	10	15	75
Calder United	10	6	0	1541	1137	135.53%	40	Preliminary Final	Wedderburn	11	13	79	Birchip-Watchem	9	4	58
Birchip-Watchem	9	6	1	1531	958	159.81%	38	Grand Final	Sea Lake Nandaly	8	8	56	Wedderburn	12	10	82
St Arnaud	7	9	0	1323	1379	95.94%	28									
Boort	5	11	0	1323	1594	83.00%	20									
Donald	3	12	1	1124	1460	76.99%	14									
Charlton	0	16	0	343	2616	13.11%	0									
