= Wally Shearer =

Australian rules footballer, born 1918

Personal information
- Full name: Wally Shearer
- Born: 29 September 1918
- Died: 29 May 2000 (aged 81)
- Original team: Donald
- Height: 178 cm (5 ft 10 in)
- Weight: 70 kg (154 lb)
- Position: rover

Playing career^{1}
Years	Club	Games (Goals)
1941–42	Footscray	20 (18)
- ^{1} Playing statistics correct to the end of 1942.

Wally Shearer (29 September 1918 – 29 May 2000) was a former Australian rules footballer who played with Footscray in the Victorian Football League (VFL).

Shearer initially played several practice matches in 1939 prior to making his VFL debut in round four, 1941.

Shearer won the 1948 and 1951 North Central Football League's best and fairest award, the Feeney Medal and was a former captain-coach of Donald.
