= Southern Mallee Football League =

Former Australian rules football league

The Southern Mallee Football League (SMFL) was an Australian rules football competition that finished in 1996 based in the Mallee region of Victoria, Australia. The league featured three grades in the Australian rules football competition, being First-Grade, Reserve-Grade and Under 16s.

== History ==
Southern Mallee Football Association

The Southern Mallee Football Association (SMFA) was formed in the 1932 and continued until 1996 when it merged with the Northern Mallee Football League to form the Mallee Football League (Victoria).

In the 1937 SMFA grand final, E McCarthy kicked 15 goals for Hopetoun Football Club to help them defeat Kenmare.

In April, 1938 the SMFA was renamed the SMF League at its annual general meeting.

A Reserves / Second Eighteen football competition was introduced by the SMFL in 1948.

The thirds competition may have been introduced in 1969 and ran as an under 16 boys competition.

Southern Mallee Football League - 1932 to 1937

From 1932 to 1937, there was also a Southern Mallee Football League (SMFL).

The SMFL also had a junior competition in 1936.

Prior to the start of the 1937 SMFL season, there was a number of clubs considering moving to another league, which caused a delay to the start of the season.

The SMFL folded prior to the start of the 1938 season, with a number of clubs wishing to move to other neighbouring leagues and with Sea Lake going onto play in the Manangatang Waitchie Football League.

== Clubs ==
=== Southern Mallee Football League (1932-1996) ===
Known as Southern Mallee Football Association from 1932 - 1937.

==== Final clubs ====
Club	Colours	Nickname	Home Ground	Former League	Est.	Years in SMFL	SMFL Senior Premierships		Fate
Club	Colours	Nickname	Home Ground	Former League	Est.	Years in SMFL	Total	Years	Fate
Berri-Culgoa		Tigers	Berriwillock Rec. Reserve, Berriwillock and Culgoa Recreation Reserve, Culgoa	–	1975	1979-1996	3	1994, 1995, 1996	Formed Mallee FL in 1997
Beulah		Blues	Beulah Rec. Reserve, Beulah	MFA	1893	1932-1996	18	1933, 1935, 1947, 1950, 1953, 1954, 1955, 1956, 1961, 1962, 1964, 1975, 1981, 1982, 1985, 1989, 1990, 1992	Formed Mallee FL in 1997
Brim		Eagles	Brim Rec. Reserve, Brim	MFA	1890s	1932-1996	5	1932, 1948, 1951, 1952, 1987	Formed Mallee FL in 1997
Hopetoun		Devils	Hopetoun Rec. Reserve, Hopetoun	MFA	1890s	1936-1996	13	1937, 1938, 1939, 1965, 1966, 1969, 1972, 1973, 1975, 1976, 1983, 1984, 1991	Formed Mallee FL in 1997
Jeparit		Redbacks	Sir Robert Menzies Park, Jeparit	WFL	1900s	1990-1996	0	-	Merged with Rainbow to form Jeparit-Rainbow in Mallee FL 1997
Nullawil		Maroons	Nullawil Rec. Reserve, Nullawil	TFL	1900s	1979-1996	3	1979, 1980, 1986	Formed Mallee FL in 1997
Rainbow		Saints	Rainbow Rec. Reserve, Rainbow	JDFL	1900s	1937-1996	3	1959, 1963, 1970	Merged with Jeparit to form Jeparit-Rainbow in Mallee FL 1997
Woomelang-Lascelles		Combine, Cats	Woomelang Rec. Reserve, Woomelang	–	1951	1951-1996	6	1957, 1960, 1968, 1971, 1988, 1993	Formed Mallee FL in 1997
Yaapeet		Purples	Yaapeet Rec. Reserve, Yaapeet	JDFL	1900s	1946-1996	4	1958, 1967, 1977, 1978	Formed Mallee FL in 1997

==== Former clubs ====
Club	Colours	Nickname	Home Ground	Former League	Est.	Years in SMFL	SMFL Senior Premierships		Fate
Club	Colours	Nickname	Home Ground	Former League	Est.	Years in SMFL	Total	Years	Fate
Kenmare				RFA	1900s	1932–1940, 1946-1954	1	1936	Disbanded after 1954 season
Lascelles		Cats	Lascelles Rec. Reserve, Lascelles	NMFL	1900s	1946-1950	2	1946, 1949	Merged with Woomelang to form Woomelang-Lascelles in 1951
Rosebery			Rosebery Rec. Reserve, Rosebery	SMFA	1894	1951-1954	0	-	Moved to Mallee FL in 1955
Warracknabeal Seconds		Lions	Warracknabeal Rec. Reserve, Warracknabeal	WFL	1870s	1957-1959	0	-	Returned to Wimmera FL in 1960
Woomelang		Magpies	Woomelang Rec. Reserve, Woomelang	NCFL	1900s	1940-1950	1	1940	Merged with Lascelles to form Woomelang-Lascelles in 1951

=== Southern Mallee Football Association (1932-1937) ===
==== Final clubs ====
Club	Colours	Nickname	Home Ground	Former League	Est.	Years in SMFA	SMFA Senior Premierships		Fate
Club	Colours	Nickname	Home Ground	Former League	Est.	Years in SMFA	Total	Years	Fate
Berriwillock		Bullfrogs	Berriwillock Rec. Reserve, Berriwillock	NMDFA	1890s	1932-1937	2	1933, 1936	Moved to Wycheproof District FL in 1938
Lalbert			Lalbert Rec. Reserve, Lalbert	LMFA	1904	1936-1937	0	-	Moved to Northern District FA in 1938
Quambatook		Tigers	Quambatook Rec. Reserve, Quambatook	KFA	1910s	1937	0	-	Moved to Wycheproof District FL in 1938
Rosebery				MFA	1894	1932-1937	1	1934	Moved to Southern Mallee FL in 1938
Sea Lake		Seagulls	Sea Lake Rec. Reserve, Sea Lake	NMDFA	1894	1932-1937	3	1934, 1935, 1937	Moved to Manangatang Waitchie FL in 1938
Ultima		Roos	Ultima Recreation Reserve, Ultima	NDFA	1900s	1936-1937	0	-	Moved to Northern District FA in 1938
Woomelang			Woomelang Rec. Reserve, Woomelang	MFA	1900s	1937	0	-	Moved to North Central FL in 1938

==== Former clubs ====
Club	Colours	Nickname	Home Ground	Former League	Est.	Years in SMFA	SMFA Senior Premierships		Fate
Club	Colours	Nickname	Home Ground	Former League	Est.	Years in SMFA	Total	Years	Fate
Birchip		Swans	Birchip Rec. Reserve, Birchip	NCFL		1932-1933	0	-	Returned to North Central FL in 1934
Culgoa			Culgoa Rec, Reserve, Culgoa	NMDFA	1890s	1932-1936	0	-	Moved to Wycheproof District FL in 1937
Nullawil		Maroons	Nullawil Rec. Reserve, Nullawil	NMDFA	1900s	1932-1936	0	-	Moved to Wycheproof District FL in 1937
Wycheproof		Demons	Wycheproof Recreation Reserve, Wycheproof	NMDFA	1890s	1932	1	1932	Moved to Charlton Wycheproof FL in 1933

== Senior Football Premierships ==
Southern Mallee Football Association
1932 - 1937
Southern Mallee Football League
1938 - 1996
Seniors

Year	Premiers	Score	Runner-up	Score
1932	Brim	7.12.54	Beulah	6.4.40
1933	Beulah	11.14.80	Rosebery	8.4.52
1934	Rosebery	9.9.63	Beulah	8.10.58
1935	Beulah	10.4.64	Brim	4.9.33
1936	Kenmare	9.20.74	Brim	5.8.38
1937	Hopetoun	21.17.143	Kenmare	6.7.43
1938	Hopetoun	21-11-137	Rainbow	11-6-72
1939	Hopetoun	15-5-95	Brim	11-9-75
1940	Woomelang	18.4.112	Hopetoun	11.14.80
1941-1945	Competition in recess due to World War Two			
1946	Lascelles	14.18.102	Kenmare	8.11.59
1947	Beulah	11.15.81	Kenmare	8.23.71
1948	Brim	8.16.64	Hopetoun	8.14.62
1949	Lascelles	13.11.89	Beulah	6.12.48
1950	Beulah	7.13.55	Lascelles	4.12.36
1951	Brim	13.16.94	Beulah	11.15.81
1952	Brim	14.18.102	Beulah	9.11.65
1953	Beulah	10.18.78	Hopetoun	11.10.76
1954	Beulah	13.19.97	Hopetoun	8.13.61
1955	Beulah	5.14.44	Hopetoun	3.9.27
1956	Beulah	17.12.114	Yaapeet	16.4.100
1957	Woomelang-Lascelles	6.12.48	Beulah	6.10.46
1958	Yaapeet	13.9.87	Hopetoun	11.14.80
1959	Rainbow	14.11.95	Woomelang-Lascelles	8.16.64
1960	Woomelang-Lascelles	5.14.44	Rainbow	3.16.34
1961	Beulah	15.10.100	Hopetoun	8.13.61
1962	Beulah	13.16.94	Rainbow	14.8.92
1963	Rainbow	9.20.74	Woomelang-Lascelles	10.12.72
1964	Beulah	17.11.113	Yaapeet	8.8.56
1965	Hopetoun	14.16.100	Beulah	10.13.73
1966	Hopetoun	14.12.96	Yaapeet	9.7.61
1967	Yaapeet	12.10.82	Hopetoun	11.15.81
1968	Woomelang-Lascelles	13-11-89	Rainbow	11-10-76
1969	Hopetoun	11.12.78	Rainbow	7.11.53
1970	Rainbow	13.12.90	Hopetoun	13.10.88
1971	Woomelang-Lascelles	16.10.106	Hopetoun	15.13.103
1972	Hopetoun	20.19.139	Woomelang-Lascelles	9.10.64
1973	Hopetoun	33.13.211	Beulah	13.6.84
1974	Beulah	10-16-76	Hopetoun	9-12-66
1975	Hopetoun	20.24.144	Beulah	12.7.79
1976	Hopetoun	16.18.114	Beulah	14.9.93
1977	Yaapeet	21.10.136	Hopetoun	16.16.112
1978	Yaapeet	16.11.107	Woomelang-Lascelles	10.15.75
1979	Nullawil	18.15.123	Beulah	13.11.89
1980	Nullawil	15-14-104	Hopetoun	11-12-78
1981	Beulah	17-19-121	Hopetoun	17-8-110
1982	Beulah	13-21-99	Nullawil	8-12-60
1983	Hopetoun	19-14-128	Nullawil	11-15-81
1984	Hopetoun	18-19-127	Nullawil	9-9-63
1985	Beulah	21-14-140	Yaapeet	12-10-82
1986	Nullawil	12-10-82	Beulah	10-7-67
1987	Brim	17.13.115	Nullawil	14.10.94
1988	Woomelang-Lascelles	8-15-63	Berri-Culgoa	3-13-31
1989	Beulah	14-7-91	Berri-Culgoa	10-12-72
1990	Beulah	18-13-121	Hopetoun	13-6-84
1991	Hopetoun	17-16-118	Beulah	16-9-105
1992	Beulah	10.12.72	Berri-Culgoa	7.19.61
1993	Woomelang-Lascelles	15-11-101	Beulah	12-11-83
1994	Berri-Culgoa	24.20-164	Nullawil	11-4-70
1995	Berri-Culgoa	16-19-115	Jeparit	7-11-53
1996	Berri-Culgoa	22-21-153	Nullawil	7-10-52

Southern Mallee Football League
1932 to 1937

Year	Premiers	Score	Runner-up	Score
1932	Wycheproof	14.17 - 10	Sea Lake	6.7 - 43
1933	Berriwillock	10.8 - 68	Sea Lake	7.15 - 57
1934	Sea Lake	14.14 - 98	Berriwillock	11.12 - 78
1935	Sea Lake	8.6 - 54	Berriwillock	7.11 - 53
1936	Berriwillock	10.11 - 71	Sea Lake	5.29 - 59
1937	Sea Lake	9.7 - 61	Lalbert	8.12 - 60

== Reserves Football Premierships ==
Southern Mallee Football League
Reserves - 1948 to 1996

Year	Premiers	Score	Runner-up	Score
1962	Rosebery	9.10.64	Woomelang - Lascelles	7.12.54
1963	Rainbow	11.7.73	Woomelang - Lascelles	3.15.33
1964	Hopetoun	6.18.54	Beulah	7.6.48
1965	Woomelang - Lascelles	20.14.134	Hopetoun	9.11.65
1966				
1967				
1968	Rainbow	11.18.82	Woomelang - Lascelles	6.9.51
1969	Hopetoun	11.12.78	Beulah	7.3.45
1970				
1971				
1972	Hopetoun	14.15.99	Brim	5.9.39
1973				
1974	Beulah	12.14.86	Yaapeet	8.4.52
1975	Woomelang - Lascelles	13.13.91	Hopetoun	10.11.71
1976				
1977				
1978				
1979	Nullawil	14.17.101	Yaapeet	7.9.51
1980	Brim	14.11.95	Beulah	13.16.94
1981	Brim	17.9.111	Beulah	11.18 - 84
1982	Beulah	15.15.105	Berri - Culgoa	14.14.98
1983	Berri - Culgoa	23.20.158	Beulah	12.8.80
1984	Hopetoun	13.12.90	Beulah	11.13.79
1985	Hopetoun	18.11.107	Brim	15.10.100
1986				
1987				
1988				
1989	Yaapeet	14.14.98	Hopetoun	7.10.52
1990				

== Thirds Football Premierships ==
Southern Mallee Football League
Thirds / Under 16's - 1969 ? to 1996

Year	Premiers	Score	Runner-up	Score
1969	Hopetoun	7.4.46	Beulah	7.3.45
1970				
1971				
1972				
1973				
1974				
1975	Rainbow	12.12.84	Hopetoun	5.5.35
1976				
1977				
1978				
1979	Woomelang - Lascelles	11.5.71	Hopetoun	7.9.51
1980				
1981	Hopetoun	8.8.56	Woomelang - Lascelles	1.3.9
1982	Hopetoun	13.5.83	Beulah	4.7.31
1983				
1984	Beulah	7.10.52	Hopetoun	5.4.34
1985	Beulah	10.5.65	Hopetoun	5.5.35
1986				
1987				
1988				
1989	Woomelang - Lascelles	18.5.113	Hopetoun	3.0.18
1990				

== Fourths Football Premierships ==
Southern Mallee Football League
Fourths / Under 13's - 1984 to 1996

Year	Premiers	Score	Runner-up	Score
1984	Hopetoun	2.2.14	Brim	1.1.7

== Football Best and Fairest Award ==
Southern Mallee Football Association - 1932 to 1939
Southern Mallee Football League - 1946 - 1996
Robert Ford Memorial Trophy
Seniors

Year	B & F Winner	Club	Votes	Runner up	Club	Votes
1934	H Boschen	Rosebery	17	W Male	Kenmare	15
1946	Jim Gull	Kenmare				
1948	Jack Kranz	Beulah				
1951	Bill Heath	Rosebery				
1985	Leon Krelle	Yaapeet	20	G Clayton	Brim	19

== Links ==
- 1932 - Southern Mallee Football League Premiers: Wycheproof FC team photo
- 1933 - Southern Mallee Football Association Premiers: Beulah FC team photo
- 1934 - Southern Mallee Football Association Premiers: Rosebery FC team photo
- 1934 - Southern Mallee Football League Premiers: Sea Lake FC team photo
- 1947 - Southern Mallee Football League Premiers: Beulah FC team photo
- Mallee Football League (Victoria)
- Northern Mallee Football League
