= Trent Sporn =

Australian rules footballer (born 1982)

Personal information
- Born: 23 September 1982 (age 44)
- Original team: North Adelaide (SANFL)
- Debut: Round 2, 6 April 2002, Carlton vs. Sydney Swans, at Optus Oval
- Height: 188 cm (6 ft 2 in)
- Weight: 85 kg (187 lb)

Playing career^{1}
Years	Club	Games (Goals)
2002–2006	Carlton	50 (8)
- ^{1} Playing statistics correct to the end of 2006.

Career highlights
- Carlton NAB AFL Rising Star nominee 2003.; Carlton Pre-Season premiership side 2005.

Trent Sporn (born 23 September 1982) is a former Australian rules footballer who played in the Australian Football League (AFL).

Sporn was recruited as the number 11 draft pick in the 2000 AFL draft from North Adelaide. Although recruited from South Australia, he grew up in the Victorian town of Murrayville.

Primarily a defender, Sporn made his debut for the Carlton Football Club in Round 2, 2002 against the Sydney Swans. Sporn had a horror run with injuries throughout his career and had his best season in 2003 when he managed to play 14 games and receive up a Rising Star nomination. In six seasons on the Carlton list, Sporn managed 50 games, playing his 50th game in Round 22, 2006 against the Sydney Swans. He was delisted at the end of the season.

Sporn returned to North Adelaide in 2007 and played until 2010, retiring in the middle of the season after suffering recurring hamstring injuries. He played a total of 53 games for the Roosters, and was the club's vice-captain at the time of his retirement. After retiring from the SANFL, Sporn played for his junior club, Murrayville, in the Mallee Football League, before retiring due to injury at the end of 2013.
