= Mallee Football League (Victoria) =

Australian rules football and netball competition

- Founded: 1997
- Folded: 2015
- No. of teams: 5

The Mallee Football Netball League (MFNL) was an Australian rules football and netball competition finishing in 2015 with just five clubs based in the Mallee region of northwestern Victoria, Australia. The league featured three grades in the Australian rules football competition, being First-Grade, Reserve-Grade and Under 16s. It is not to be confused with the identically named Mallee Football League (South Australia).

== History ==
The Mallee Football League was formed in 1997 from the merger of the Northern Mallee Football League and Southern Mallee Football League. The Northern Mallee Football League had been reduced to four clubs after Ouyen Rovers and Tempy-Gorya-Patchewollock merged to form Ouyen United in September 2015.

The Mallee Football League was disbanded at the end of the 2015 season due to insufficient member clubs.

== Clubs ==
=== Final clubs ===
Club	Jumper	Nickname	Home Ground	Former League	Est.	Years in Competition	MFL Senior Premierships		Fate
Club	Jumper	Nickname	Home Ground	Former League	Est.	Years in Competition	Total	Years	Fate
Ouyen United		Demons	Blackburn Park, Ouyen	–	1997	1997-2015	3	1998, 2006, 2011	Merged with Walpeup-Underbool in 2016 to form Ouyen United Kangaroos in the Sunraysia FL
Sea Lake-Nandaly Tigers		Tigers	Sea Lake Rec. Reserve, Sea Lake; Berriwillock Rec. Reserve, Berriwillock and Culgoa Recreation Reserve, Culgoa	–	2003	2003-2015	3	2009, 2014, 2015	Moved to North Central FL in 2016
Southern Mallee Giants		Giants	Beulah Rec. Reserve, Beulah and Hopetoun Rec. Reserve, Hopetoun	–	2015	2015	0	-	Moved to Horsham & District FL in 2016
Walpeup-Underbool		Kangaroos	Underbool Rec. Reserve, Underbool	NMFL	1982	1997-2015	4	2001, 2007, 2008, 2012	Merged with Ouyen United in 2016 to form Ouyen United Kangaroos in the Sunraysia FL
Woomelang-Lascelles		Cats	Woomelang Rec. Reserve, Woomelang	SMFL	1951	1997-2015	1	2013	Folded when the league finished in 2016

=== Former clubs ===
Club	Jumper	Nickname	Home Ground	Former League	Est.	Years in Competition	MFL Senior Premierships		Fate
Club	Jumper	Nickname	Home Ground	Former League	Est.	Years in Competition	Total	Years	Fate
Berri-Culgoa		Tigers	Berriwillock Rec. Reserve, Berriwillock and Culgoa Recreation Reserve, Culgoa	SMFL	1975	1997-2002	1	1999	Merged with Sea Lake-Nandaly in 2003 to form Sea Lake-Nandaly Tigers
Beulah		Blues	Beulah Rec. Reserve, Beulah	SMFL	1893	1997-2014	5	2000, 2003, 2004, 2005, 2010	Merged with Hopetoun to form Southern Mallee Giants in 2015
Brim		Eagles	Brim Rec. Reserve, Brim	SMFL	1890s	1997-2001	0	-	Merged with Warracknabeal in 2002 to form Warrack Eagles in Wimmera FL
Hopetoun		Devils	Hopetoun Rec. Reserve, Hopetoun	SMFL	1890s	1997-2014	0	-	Merged with Beulah to form Southern Mallee Giants in 2015
Jeparit-Rainbow		Lakers	Sir Robert Menzies Park, Jeparit and Rainbow Rec. Reserve, Rainbow	–	1996	1997-2014	1	1997	Moved to Horsham & District FL in 2015
Manangatang		Saints	Manangatang Rec. Reserve, Manangatang	NMFL	1900s	1997-2003	1	2002	Merged with Tooleybuc in 2004 to form Tooleybuc-Manangatang in the Central Murray FL
Nullawil		Maroons	Nullawil Rec. Reserve, Nullawil	SMFL	1900s	1997	0	-	Moved to Golden Rivers FL in 1998
Sea Lake-Nandaly		Seagulls	Sea Lake Rec. Reserve, Sea Lake	NMFL	1993	1997-2002	0	-	Merged with Berri-Culgoa in 2003 to form Sea Lake-Nandaly Tigers
Yaapeet		Purples	Yaapeet Rec. Reserve, Yaapeet	SMFL	1900s	1997-1999	0	-	Folded in 2000

== Football Premierships ==
Seniors

- 1997 Jeparit-Rainbow
- 1998 Ouyen United
- 1999 Berri-Culgoa
- 2000 Beulah
- 2001 Walpeup-Underbool
- 2002 Managatang
- 2003 Beulah
- 2004 Beulah
- 2005 Beulah
- 2006 Ouyen United
- 2007 Walpeup-Underbool
- 2008 Walpeup-Underbool: 20.24 - 144 d Sea Lake-Nandaly Tigers: 9.9 - 63
- 2009 Sea Lake-Nandaly Tigers: 19.19 - 133 d Ouyen United: 14.16 - 100
- 2010 Beulah: 14.14 - 98 d Ouyen United: 10.12 - 72
- 2011 Ouyen United: 17.14 - 116 d Sea Lake-Nandaly Tigers: 8.12 - 60
- 2012 Walpeup-Underbool: 26.13 - 169 d Sea Lake-Nandaly Tigers: 9.6 - 60
- 2013 Woomelang-Lascelles: 15.14 - 104 d Sea Lake-Nandaly Tigers: 16.6 - 102
- 2014 Sea Lake-Nandaly Tigers: 11.14 - 80 d Woomelang Lascelles: 9.8 - 62
- 2015 Sea Lake-Nandaly Tigers: 18.17 - 125 d Ouyen United: 10.11 - 71

Reserves

- 2014 Beulah: 14.7 - 91 d Sea Lake Nandaly Tigers: 7.10 - 52
- 2015 Walpeup-Underbool: 25.11 - 161 d Sea Lake Nandaly Tigers: 5.6 - 36

Thirds / Under 16's

- 2014 Ouyen United: 12.14 - 86 d Woomelang Lascelles: 4.4 - 28
- 2015 Ouyen United: 9.9 - 63 d Sea Lake Nandaly Tigers: 7.9 - 51

== Leading Goal Kickers ==
Seniors

Year	Player	H&A goals	Finals goals	Total Goals
1997	Tony Doran (Nullawil)	110	2	112
1998	Anthony Perkins (Jeparit Rainbow)	75	1	76
1999	Joel Robins (Beulah)	121	19	140
2000	Greg Barras (Sea Lake Nandaly)	100	10	110
2001	Joel Robins (Beulah)	81	7	88
2002	Jarrod Arentz (Manangatang)	132	19	151
2003	Jarrod Arentz (Manangatang)	75	17	92
2004	Tom Vadljo (Ouyen United)	79	0	79
2005	Ben Zanker (Jeparit Rainbow)	80	0	80
2006	Robert Lindsey (Ouyen United)	105	0	105
2007	Mattre Brown (Walpeup-Underbool)	67	0	67
2008	Simon Weekley (Sea Lake Nandaly)	97	0	97
2009	Nathan Wight (Sea Lake Nandaly)	81	0	81
2010	Bryce Wellington (Hopetoun)	67	0	67
2011	Robert Lindsey (Ouyen United)	98	13	111
2012	David King (Beulah)	69	0	69
2013	Cliff Ryan (Sea Lake Nandaly)	98	12	110
2014	Cliff Ryan (Sea Lake Nandaly)	74	3	77
2015	Jordan Doering (Sea Lake Nandaly)	69	13	82

== League Best & Fairest ==
Seniors
Russ Gravestocks Medal.

Russel Frederick "Russ" Gravestocks was a former long serving secretary of the former Southern Mallee Football League and Mallee Football League.

Year	Winner	Club	Votes	Runner up	Club	Votes
1997						
1998						
1999						
2000						
2001						
2002						
2003						
2004						
2005						
2006						
2007						
2008						
2009	Scott Weekley	Sea Lake Nandaly Tigers	21	Daniel O'Bree	Ouyen United	19
2010	Scott Smith	Beulah	24	Peter Caldow	Ouyen United	22
2011	Colin Durie	Sea Lake Nandaly Tigers	17	Glen Joyce	Ouyen United	15
	Kain Robins	Hopetoun	17			
	Dale Shannon	Beulah	17			
2012	Colin Durie	Sea Lake Nandaly Tigers	19	Stephen Saunders	Beulah	18
2013	Trent Donnan	Woomelang Lascelles	18	Micah Buchanan	Beulah	16
2014	Tyler Lehmann	Beulah	20	Peter Caldow	Ouyen United	16
2015	Trent Donnan	Woomelang Lascelles	17	Arnold Kirby	Woomelang Lascelles	15

Reserves

- Tom Ryan Medal
- Hook Brain Medal

Year	Winner	Club	Votes	Runner up	Club	Votes
1997						
1998						
1999						
2000						
2001						
2002	Brad Ballantyne	Sea Lake Nandaly	15	Chris Colbert	Beulah	13
2003						
2004						
2005						
2006						
2007						
2008						
2009	John Guthrie	Sea Lake Nandaly Tigers	23	Scott Clarke	Ouyen United	18
2010	Michael Saunders	Beulah	21	Phillip Cox	Sea Lake Nandaly Tigers	20
2011	Jason Hutson	Jeparit Rainbow	16	Matthew Symes	Woomelang Lascelles	15
2012	Nathan Grayling	Walpeup Underbool	19	Lea McKenzie	Beulah	17
2013	Matthew Symes	Woomelang Lascelles	16	Harrison Wooding	Woomelang Lascelles	15
2014	Nathan Wight	Sea Lake Nandaly Tigers	19	Jason Kreuger &	Woomelang Lascelles	16
				Chris Vorwerk	Walpeup Underbool	16
2015	Ryan Monaghan	Ouyen United	17	Matthew Brown &	Walpeup Underbool	12
				Damon Carra	Southern Mallee Giants	12

Thirds / Under 16's

- Bryant Barry Medal

Year	Winner	Club	Votes	Runner up	Club	Votes
1997						
1998						
1999						
2000						
2001						
2002	Cory Waldron	Jeparit-Rainbow	41	Daniel Weuffen	Ouyen United	13
2003						
2004						
2005						
2006						
2007						
2008						
2009	Trent Donnan	Woomelang Lascelles	30	Dallas Willsmore	Walpeup-Underbool	26
2010	Devan Pohlner	Outen United	31	Nathan Cocks	Jeparit Rainbow	24
2011	Brodie Adcock	Woomelang Lascelles	39	Harry Conway	Hopetoun	25
2012	Thomas Considine &	Sea Lake Nandaly Tigers	25	Tobias Fisher	Hopetoun	24
	Samual Mead	Walpeup Underbool	25			
2013	Thomas Considine	Sea Lake Nandaly Tigers	32	Ethan Davies	Walpeup-Underbool	31
2014	Matthew Cresp	Ouyen United	27	Wade Donnan &	Woomelang Lascelles	23
				Jack Poulton	Woomelang Lascelles	23
2015	Lou White	Southern Mallee Giants	23	Wade Donnan	Woomelang Lascelles	21

== AFL Players ==
The following former Mallee FNL footballers were drafted and or played senior AFL football, with the year indicating their AFL debut.

- 2000 - Kane Munro: West Coast. From Walpeup-Underbool
- 2007 - Mark Austin: Carlton, Western Bulldogs. From Jeparit Rainbow
- 2014 - Dallas Willsmore: Hawthorn. From Walpeup-Underbool

== 2008 Ladder ==
Mallee FL	Wins	Byes	Losses	Draws	For	Against	%	Pts	Final	Team	G	B	Pts	Team	G	B	Pts
Walpeup-Underbool	14	3	2	0	2097	1058	198.20%	56	1st Semi	Beulah	13	13	91	Jeparit-Rainbow	12	10	82
Sealake-Nandaly Tigers	13	3	3	0	1945	1013	192.00%	52	2nd Semi	Walpeup-Underbool	6	5	41	Sealake-Nandaly Tigers	5	4	34
Beulah	12	3	4	0	1519	1061	143.17%	48	Preliminary	Sealake-Nandaly Tigers	15	9	99	Beulah	13	12	90
Jeparit-Rainbow	6	3	10	0	1094	1586	68.98%	24	Grand	Walpeup-Underbool	20	24	144	Sealake-Nandaly Tigers	9	9	63
Hopetoun	5	3	11	0	1105	1606	68.80%	20									
Ouyen United	4	3	12	0	1072	1714	62.54%	16									
Woomelang-Lascelles	2	3	14	0	1097	1891	58.01%	8									

== 2009 Ladder ==
Mallee FL	Wins	Byes	Losses	Draws	For	Against	%	Pts	Final	Team	G	B	Pts	Team	G	B	Pts
Sealake-Nandaly Tigers	15	3	1	0	2023	783	258.37%	60	1st Semi	Walpeup-Underbool	14	12	96	Beulah	9	16	70
Ouyen United	12	3	4	0	1772	1227	144.42%	48	2nd Semi	Sea Lake Nandaly Tigers	14	12	96	Ouyen United	10	4	64
Walpeup-Underbool	10	3	5	1	1683	1088	154.69%	42	Preliminary	Ouyen United	11	10	76	Walpeup-Underbool	9	12	66
Beulah	9	3	6	1	1341	1228	109.20%	38	Grand	Sea Lake Nandaly Tigers	19	19	133	Ouyen United	14	16	100
Hopetoun	5	3	11	0	1047	1549	67.59%	20									
Jeparit-Rainbow	4	3	12	0	1017	1776	57.26%	16									
Woomelang-Lascelles	0	3	16	0	913	2145	42.56%	0									

== 2010 Ladder ==
Mallee FL	Wins	Byes	Losses	Draws	For	Against	%	Pts	Final	Team	G	B	Pts	Team	G	B	Pts
Beulah	16	3	0	0	2159	859	251.34%	64	1st Semi	Jeparit-Rainbow	20	11	131	Hopetoun	13	24	102
Ouyen United	14	3	2	0	2102	998	210.62%	56	2nd Semi	Beulah	17	10	112	Ouyen United	15	7	97
Hopetoun	9	3	7	0	1578	1616	97.65%	36	Preliminary	Ouyen United	13	14	92	Jeparit-Rainbow	8	13	61
Jeparit-Rainbow	8	3	8	0	1580	1383	114.24%	32	Grand	Beulah	14	14	98	Ouyen United	10	12	72
Sealake-Nandaly Tigers	7	3	9	0	1503	1423	105.62%	28									
Walpeup-Underbool	2	3	14	0	1169	1868	62.58%	8									
Woomelang-Lascelles	0	3	16	0	636	2580	24.65%	0									

== 2011 Ladder ==
Mallee FL	Wins	Byes	Losses	Draws	For	Against	%	Pts	Final	Team	G	B	Pts	Team	G	B	Pts
Ouyen United	14	3	2	0	2218	1196	185.45%	56	1st Semi	Sealake-Nandaly Tigers	14	19	103	Hopetoun	12	10	82
Beulah	13	3	3	0	1823	1218	149.67%	52	2nd Semi	Ouyen United	23	15	153	Beulah	6	14	50
Hopetoun	8	3	8	0	1475	1575	93.65%	32	Preliminary	Sealake-Nandaly Tigers	14	15	99	Beulah	10	13	73
Sealake-Nandaly Tigers	6	3	10	0	1238	1438	86.09%	24	Grand	Ouyen United	17	14	116	Sealake-Nandaly Tigers	8	12	60
Walpeup-Underbool	6	3	10	0	1321	1685	78.40%	24									
Woomelang-Lascelles	6	3	10	0	1342	1716	78.21%	24									
Jeparit-Rainbow	3	3	13	0	1157	1746	66.27%	12									

== 2012 Ladder ==
Mallee FL	Wins	Byes	Losses	Draws	For	Against	%	Pts	Final	Team	G	B	Pts	Team	G	B	Pts
Walpeup-Underbool	14	3	2	0	1905	1329	143.34%	68	1st Semi	Sealake-Nandaly Tigers	18	8	116	Beulah	13	11	89
Hopetoun	10	3	5	1	1930	1527	126.39%	54	2nd Semi	Walpeup-Underbool	22	7	139	Hopetoun	18	12	120
Sealake-Nandaly Tigers	10	3	6	0	1622	1436	112.95%	52	Preliminary	Sealake-Nandaly Tigers	14	7	91	Hopetoun	11	13	79
Beulah	9	3	7	0	1515	1305	116.09%	48	Grand	Walpeup-Underbool	26	13	169	Sealake-Nandaly Tigers	9	6	60
Ouyen United	6	3	10	0	1570	1849	84.91%	36									
Jeparit-Rainbow	4	3	12	0	1285	2014	63.80%	28									
Woomelang-Lascelles	2	3	13	1	1330	1697	78.37%	22									

== 2013 Ladder ==
Mallee FL	Wins	Byes	Losses	Draws	For	Against	%	Pts	Final	Team	G	B	Pts	Team	G	B	Pts
Sealake-Nandaly Tigers	14	3	2	0	1933	1100	175.73%	68	1st Semi	Woomelang-Lascelles	19	6	120	Walpeup-Underbool	16	9	105
Beulah	13	3	3	0	2070	1347	153.67%	64	2nd Semi	Sealake-Nandaly Tigers	15	19	109	Beulah	8	12	60
Walpeup-Underbool	11	3	5	0	1844	1406	131.15%	56	Preliminary	Woomelang-Lascelles	19	14	128	Beulah	14	16	100
Woomelang-Lascelles	8	3	8	0	1533	1378	111.25%	44	Grand	Woomelang-Lascelles	15	14	104	Sealake-Nandaly Tigers	16	6	102
Ouyen United	7	3	9	0	1642	1710	96.02%	40									
Jeparit-Rainbow	2	3	14	0	946	2159	43.82%	20									
Hopetoun	1	3	15	0	1282	2150	59.63%	16									

== 2014 Ladder ==
Mallee FL	Wins	Byes	Losses	Draws	For	Against	%	Pts	Final	Team	G	B	Pts	Team	G	B	Pts
Beulah	15	3	1	0	1927	882	218.48%	60	1st Semi	Woomelang-Lascelles	16	10	106	Ouyen United	7	13	55
Sea Lake-Nandaly Tigers	14	3	2	0	1578	1063	148.45%	56	2nd Semi	Beulah	10	14	74	Sea Lake-Nandaly Tigers	18	9	117
Woomelang-Lascelles	10	3	6	0	1519	1332	114.04%	40	Preliminary	Beulah	10	14	74	Woomelang-Lascelles	14	8	92
Ouyen United	9	3	7	0	1583	1306	121.21%	36	Grand	Sea Lake-Nandaly Tigers	11	14	80	Woomelang-Lascelles	9	8	62
Hopetoun	4	3	12	0	942	1617	60.73%	16									
Walpeup-Underbool	3	3	13	0	1127	1602	70.35%	12									
Jeparit-Rainbow	1	3	15	0	868	1782	48.71%	4									

== 2015 Ladder ==
Mallee FL	Wins	Byes	Losses	Draws	For	Against	%	Pts	Final	Team	G	B	Pts	Team	G	B	Pts
Sea Lake-Nandaly Tigers	14	4	2	0	1721	1046	164.53%	56	1st Semi	Southern Mallee Giants	7	17	59	Ouyen United	10	9	69
Woomelang-Lascelles	9	4	7	0	1594	1303	122.33%	36	2nd Semi	Sea Lake-Nandaly Tigers	20	15	135	Woomelang-Lascelles	7	8	50
Southern Mallee Giants	9	4	7	0	1614	1575	102.48%	36	Preliminary	Woomelang-Lascelles	9	14	68	Ouyen United	17	11	113
Ouyen United	5	4	11	0	1244	1692	73.52%	20	Grand	Sea Lake-Nandaly Tigers	18	17	125	Ouyen United	10	11	71
Walpeup-Underbool	3	4	13	0	1138	1695	67.14%	12									
