= Woomelang =

- Town
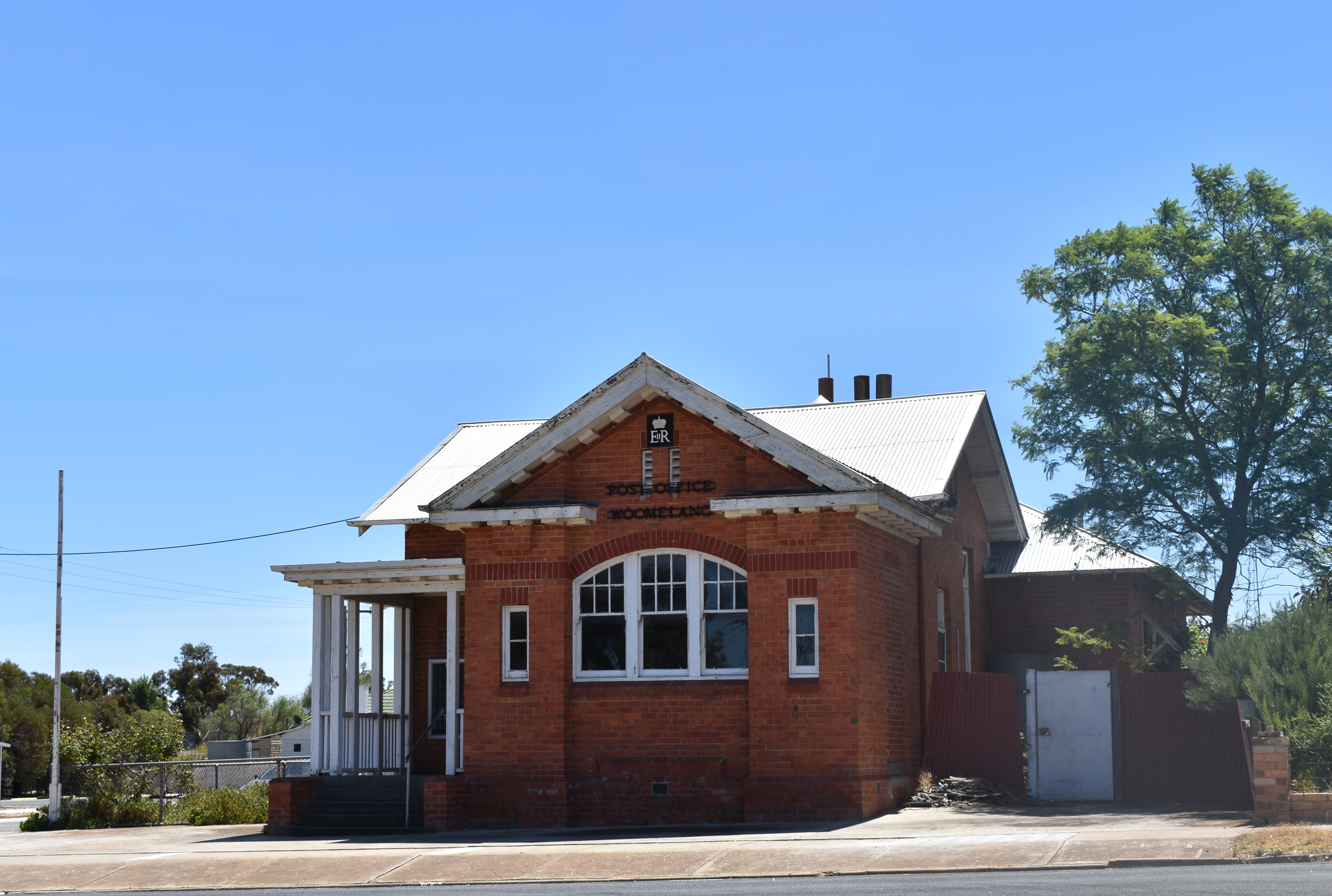
- Post office, 2018

- Coordinates: 35°41′0″S 142°40′0″E
- Country: Australia
- State: Victoria
- LGA: Shire of Yarriambiack
- Location: 359 km (223 mi) NW of Melbourne; 183 km (114 mi) SE of Mildura; 154 km (96 mi) N of Horsham

Government
  - State electorate: Mildura
  - Federal division: Mallee

Population
  - Total: 191 (2021 census)
- Postcode: 3485

Woomelang is a town in the Mallee region of Victoria, Australia. The town is in the Shire of Yarriambiack local government area and on the Sunraysia Highway, 359 kilometres (223 mi) north-west of the state capital, Melbourne, 183 kilometres (114 mi) south-east of Mildura and 154 kilometres (96 mi) north of Horsham. At the 2011 census, Woomelang and the surrounding area had a population of 191.

As with most towns in the Mallee region, the main industry is dryland agriculture and woolgrowing. The population has been slowly declining, from 290 at the 1981 census to 211 people in 2001, 195 in 2006, and 191 in 2011.

Woomelang Post Office opened on 10 August 1900.

Woomelang Magistrates' Court closed on 1 May 1981, having not been visited by a Magistrate since 1971.

An interesting attraction to the south of Woomelang is a shearing shed constructed during World War II. Due to wartime shortages, the shed is made of compacted kerosene tins.

== Sport ==
The Woomelang Football Club was founded around 1904 and initially played in the Woomelang District Football Association in 1911 and in 1912 and were undefeated premiers.

Woomelang FC were premiers of the North Western Football Association in 1921, 1922, 1926 and runners up in 1923.

Woomelang FC were runners up to Birchip in the North Central Football League in 1928 and 1929.

In 1934, Woomelang FC defeated Lascelles in the Mallee Football League preliminary final, but lost the 1934 grand final to Gorya and in 1935, Woomelang won the North Central Football League premiership.

In 1940 Woomelang defeated Hopetoun in the Southern Mallee Football League grand final.

Woomelang FC merged with Lascelles FC in 1951 and competed in the Southern Mallee Football League from 1951 to 1996, winning six senior football premierships in - 1957, 1960, 1968, 1971, 1988 and 1993 and were runners in - 1959, 1963, 1972 and 1978.

With its neighbouring township Lascelles, Woomelang had a football team (Woomelang-Lascelles) competing in the Mallee Football League, from 1997, until the league folded at the end of the 2015 season, winning a senior football premiership in 2013.

Golfers play at the course of the Woomelang Golf Club on Sunraysia Highway.

== Railway station ==
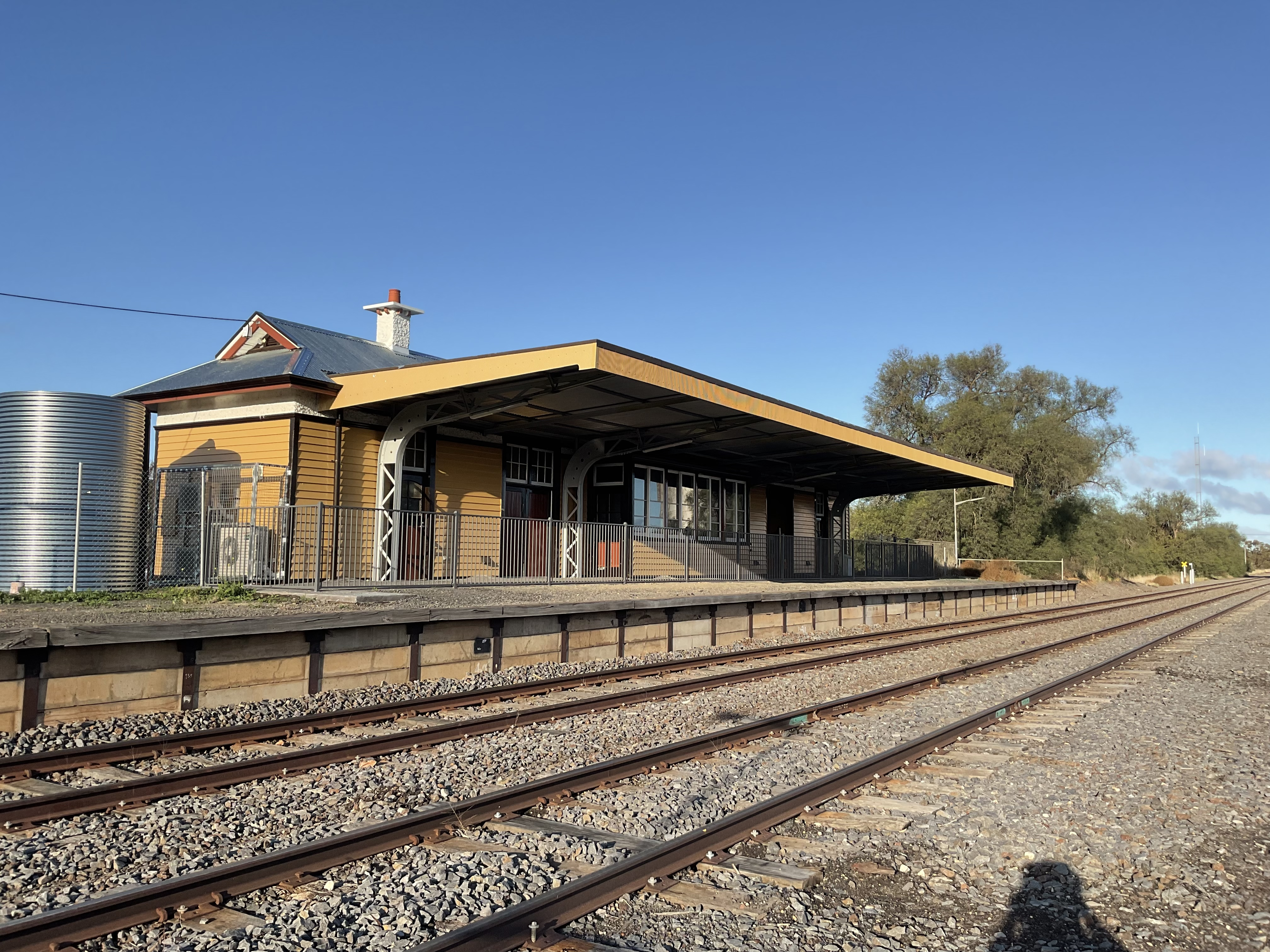
Up platform looking southbound, June 2023

Woomelang station (35°40′58″S 142°39′50″E) was opened in 1899 and was closed in 1993, when passenger services were discontinued on the Mildura line. In 1991, both the top and the bottom of the track were shortened.

Although the station is no longer in use as a passenger stop, the station building and two passenger platforms remain. Grain silos also remain in the station yard. In 2024, it was remodelled to become "affordable spaces for community use". This renovation earned a 2024 National Architecture Award from the Australian Institute of Architects.
