= Jim Brennan (Australian footballer) =

Australian rules footballer

Personal information
- Full name: Jim Brennan
- Born: 16 June 1927
- Died: 25 June 2013 (aged 86)
- Original team: Watchem-Corack
- Height: 178 cm (5 ft 10 in)
- Weight: 80 kg (176 lb)

Playing career^{1}
Years	Club	Games (Goals)
1952	Richmond	2 (0)
- ^{1} Playing statistics correct to the end of 1952.

Jim Brennan (16 June 1927 – 25 June 2013) was a former Australian rules footballer who played with Richmond in the Victorian Football League (VFL).
