= Lascelles, Victoria =

Lascelles
- Town
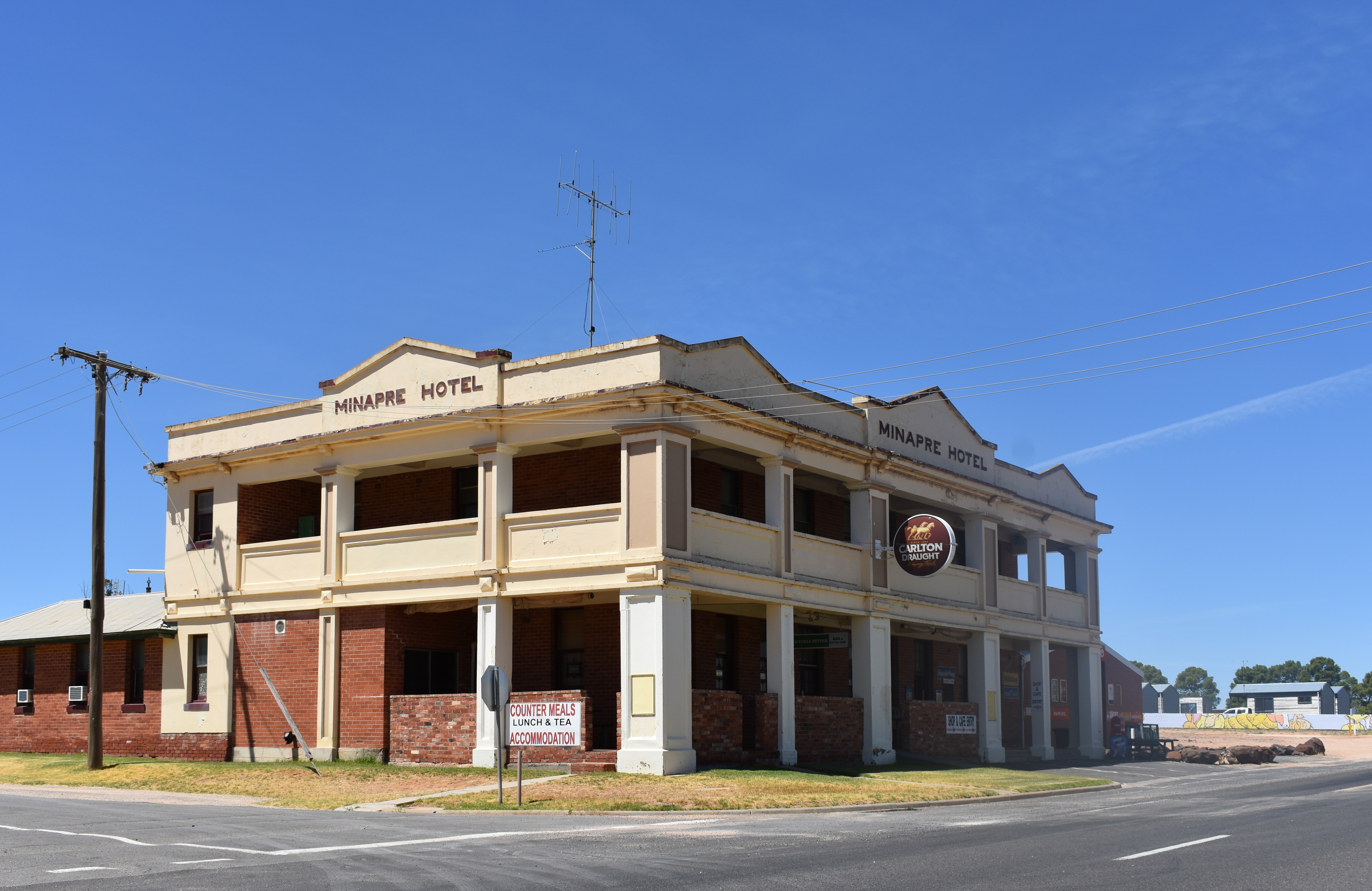
- Minapre Hotel, Lascelles

- Coordinates: 35°37′S 142°35′E
- Country: Australia
- State: Victoria
- LGA: Shire of Yarriambiack
- Location: 374 km (232 mi) from Melbourne; 169 km (105 mi) from Mildura; 113 km (70 mi) from Swan Hill; 65 km (40 mi) from Ouyen

Population
  - Total: 93 (2016 census)
- Postcode: 3487

Lascelles is a town in Victoria, Australia, located approximately 113 km from Swan Hill, Victoria. In the 2016 census the state suburb of Lascelles had a population of 93.

The township was established as a station on the Mildura railway line and was named after Edward Harewood Lascelles, owner of the Minapre grazing property in the area and a partner of wool-brokers Dennys-Lascelles. Lascelles Post Office opened in 1903 when the railway arrived.

With its neighbouring township Woomelang, Lascelles had a football team (Woomelang-Lascelles) competing in the Mallee Football League until the league folded in 2015.

In 1917, after an abnormally warm winter, the mouse population of Lascelles was so large that mice filled every square inch of ground. More than 1,500 tons of mice - it is estimated that there were over a hundred million - were slain before the outbreak was finally tamed.
