= Mallee Football League (South Australia) =

- Founded: 1994
- Folded: 2022
- No. of teams: 6

The Mallee Football League (MFL) was an Australian rules football competition in South Australia. The league comprised teams located in south eastern South Australia and one team (Murrayville) located in western Victoria.

The football season started after Easter and ended in early September. The local newspaper The Border Times had extensive coverage of each week's results of the MFL. Coverage was also provided on WIN SA and Flow FM during the season. During the Queens Holiday Weekend, the MFL selected a team to represent the Mallee against the Riverland. The league's Best & Fairest award was called the Mail Medal. Prominent players to play at a higher level include Nathan D. Brown (Melbourne FC, Australian Football League), Trent Sporn (Carlton FC), Martin Mattner (Adelaide FC) and Rodney Maynard (Adelaide FC, AFL). The league was within the West Adelaide Football Club's regional recruiting zone.

== Final season clubs ==
Club	Jumper	Nickname	Home Ground	Former League	Est.	Years in MFL	MFL Senior Premierships		Fate
Club	Jumper	Nickname	Home Ground	Former League	Est.	Years in MFL	Total	Years	Fate
Border Downs/Tintinara		Crows	Tintinara Football Oval, Tintinara and Coonalpyn Football Oval, Coonalpyn	RMFL	1993	2001–2022	12	2004, 2006, 2007, 2010, 2011, 2012, 2013, 2014, 2016, 2018, 2019, 2021	Merged with Meningie to form Coorong Cats in the River Murray FL
Karoonda Districts		Magpies	Karoonda Oval, Karoonda	–	1994	1994–2022	0	-	Merged with Peake to form Mallee District in the River Murray FL
Lameroo	(1994-?)(?-2022)	Hawks	Lameroo Sport Club, Lameroo	L&DFA	1991	1994–2022	10	1994, 1995, 1996, 1998, 1999, 2000, 2002, 2008, 2009, 2015	Merged with Pinnaroo to form the Southern Mallee Suns in the River Murray FL
Murrayville		Bulldogs	Murrayville Football Oval, Murrayville	L&DFA	1960	1994–2022	2	2003, 2005	Moved to the Murray Valley FNL
Peake & District	(1994-?)(2000s)(?-2022)	Lions	Peake Oval, Peake	MLFL	1978	1994–2022	1	2017	Merged with Karoonda to form Mallee District in the River Murray FL
Pinnaroo		Supa Roos	Pinnaroo Oval, Pinnaroo	L&DFA	1908	1994–2022	3	1997, 2001, 2022	Merged with Lameroo to form the Southern Mallee Suns in the River Murray FL

=== Former clubs ===
Club	Jumper	Nickname	Home Ground	Former League	Est.	Years in MFL	MFL Senior Premierships		Fate
Club	Jumper	Nickname	Home Ground	Former League	Est.	Years in MFL	Total	Years	Fate
Ngallo		Demons	Pinnaroo Oval, Pinnaroo (formerly Panitya Recreation Reserve, Panitya)	L&DFA	1910	1994–2000	0	-	Folded in 2001
Parilla-Geranium		Roosters	Parilla Sports Club, Parilla	L&DFA	1991	1994–1997	0	-	Folded in 1998

=== Border Downs/Tintinara Crows ===
Located in Tintinara and Coonalpyn, the Crows were in the MFL between 2001 and 2022. BDT FC was formed after the Border Downs and the Tintinara clubs merged. BDT were one of only two teams in the league to not be on the Mallee Highway, with the other being Karoonda.

Prior to their amalgamation in 1993 Border Downs had competed in the River Murray Football League since 1955, while Tintinara had been a member of the Tatiara Football League for the same length of time. Before joining the TFL Tintinara had enjoyed premiership success on three occasions in the Lakes District Football Association. The club later added a solitary TFL flag in 1977. Border Downs’ record was undistinguished as the club’s senior grade team never once made it as far as a grand final. Following the merger the Crows spent seven seasons competing in the RMFL before crossing to the South Australian version of the Mallee Football League. Since joining the MFL the club has been successful across all levels winning more premierships than any other club since the turn of the century.

Border Downs Tintinara are considered to be one of the most successful teams in South Australian Country football, winning 5 premierships in a row from 2010–14. Then adding to their total again in 2016.

Border Downs Tintinara played their final season in the MFL in 2022 after agreeing to merge with Meningie to form the Coorong Cats Football Club and play in the River Murray Football League in 2023.

=== Karoonda Magpies ===
Football started in Karoonda in the year 1914, two years after the town was settled. The first team was called Karoonda Football Club. In 1977 Borrika Football club (situated 16 km east of Karoonda) merged with Karoonda Football Club to be called Karoonda Borrika Football Club. In 1994 United (situated 12 km south of Karoonda) and Wynarka (situated 15 km west of Karoonda) Football Clubs merged with Karoonda Borrika Football Club to form Karoonda Districts Football Club. On 10 June 2005 Karoonda was hit by a freak tornado which semi demolished the clubrooms. With support from the local council and many community and regional people and businesses the club rebuilt and improved the clubrooms to the excellent standard they are now, after spending the 2005 and 2006 seasons in portable rooms behind the western goals. Karoonda agreed to merge with Peake & Districts to join the River Murray Football League in 2023.

=== Lameroo Hawks ===
Based in Lameroo, 200 kilometres east of Adelaide. Lameroo football club is the home of former Adelaide Crows player Rodney Maynard, who still plays an active part in the club.

=== Murrayville Bulldogs ===
Based in Murrayville in Victoria, the Bulldogs are the only Victorian team in an otherwise South Australian league. The club's colours were red, white and blue.

Prior to 1994 the club competed in various different competitions, with its most notable achievements coming during its stint in the Lameroo and Districts Football League. Between 1979 and 1993 the Bulldogs qualified for the ultimate match of the season on no fewer than nine occasions, emerging victorious against Ngallo in 1980, and Lameroo North the following year as well as three seasons straight between 1984 and 1986. Since joining the MFL in 1994 Murrayville have generally been a mid-table team, however they had a great run of results between 2001–07, winning two of the five Grand Finals they played in.

Sadly in recent years junior numbers have dwindled with some of its under age teams not being able to compete due to low numbers in some years. This has seen a number of former Murrayville juniors move to neighbouring football clubs in Pinnaroo and Ouyen United (formerly Underbool-Walpeup).

Murrayville agreed to join the Murray Valley Football League in 2023.

=== Peake Lions ===
The Peake & District Football club is based in Peake and include the surrounding towns of Geranium, Jabuk, Parrakie and Peake. The Club's colours are red, blue and yellow. The Peake Oval is most famous for being on a gradual downhill slant, which has created many mixed strategies to play effective football.

Peake & District agreed to merge with Karoonda to join the River Murray Football League in 2023.

=== Pinnaroo Supa Roos ===
Based in Pinnaroo, South Australia, the Pinnaroo Football Club plays its home games at the Pinnaroo Showgrounds. The Club has four teams in the Mallee Football League: "A" Grade, Reserves ("B" Grade), Senior Colts (Under 16's), and the Junior Colts (Under 13's). The colours of the Pinnaroo Supa Roos are red, white and black.

The original Pinnaroo Football Club was established in 1908 and had won a total of half a dozen premierships by the time it split into two separate teams, North Pinnaroo and South Pinnaroo, in 1925. In 1944 these two teams amalgamated and the resultant club, known as Pinnaroo, won premierships both that year and in 1946 before splitting in two again in 1947. This is how things remained until 1974 when North and South joined forces once more, giving birth to today’s Pinnaroo Supa Roos. Between 1974 and 1993 Pinnaroo was affiliated with the Lameroo and Districts Football League. The seniors won a premiership in their very first season, but thereafter the closest they got was runners-up in 1975, 1990 and 1993. Since commencing in the Mallee Football League in 1994 the Supa Roos have had mixed results across all levels, being one of the few teams in the league relying almost entirely on local players rather buying in players from other regions and Adelaide.

The Pinnaroo Football Club shared the Pinnaroo Showgrounds with the Ngallo Demons Football Club in its final years until it went into recess in 2000. Ngallo's presence is still seen with the visitors rooms and interchanges bench in the navy and blue of the Demons. In 2007 the Pinnaroo Showgrounds suffered great damage after a mini-tornado hit the historic show pavilion and grandstand, fortunately after its demolition a smaller pavilion was built in its place at the same time the clubrooms received a significant upgrade. Pinnaroo won the Mallee Football League's final A Grade premiership in 2022, breaking a 21 year drought.

== Brief history ==
The Mallee Football League was formed in 1994 when the Lameroo & Districts Football League and the Murraylands Football League amalgamated.

There were 7 clubs involved with Karoonda Districts, Lameroo, Murrayville, Ngallo, Parilla / Geranium, Peake & District and Pinnaroo.

Parilla / Geranium went into recess in 1998 and Ngallo followed in 2001. Border Downs Tintinara joined the Mallee League in 2002, winning 12 A grade premierships.

After the majority of clubs agreed to move to neighbouring leagues, the Mallee Football League folded at the conclusion of the 2022 season.

== Premiers ==
Season	Premier	Runner up	Score	Mail Medal (Season's Best & Fairest)
1994	Lameroo	Karoonda Districts	27.16 (178) – 12.9 (81)	
1995	Lameroo	Murrayville	16.13 (109) - 12.13 (85)	
1996	Lameroo	Pinnaroo	23.14(152) – 13.9 (87)	
1997	Pinnaroo	Lameroo	17.16 (118) – 16.7 (103)	
1998	Lameroo	Karoonda Districts	13.16 (94) – 8.11 (59)	
1999	Lameroo	Ngallo	23.15 (153) – 11.8 (74)	
2000	Lameroo	Pinnaroo	11.13 (79) - 8.12 (60)	
2001	Pinnaroo	Murrayville	7.10 (52) – 4.7 (31)	
2002	Lameroo	Border Downs/Tintinara	15.15 (105) – 8.10 (58)	
2003	Murrayville	Pinnaroo	15.9 (99) – 6.5 (41)	
2004	Border Downs/Tintinara	Murrayville	23.15 (153) – 5.3 (33)	
2005	Murrayville	Karoonda Districts	18.10 (118) – 14.10 (94)	
2006	Border Downs/Tintinara	Lameroo	14.9 (93) – 8.10 (58)	Sunyl Vogt (Pinn) & Josh Richardson (BDT)
2007	Border Downs/Tintinara	Murrayville	16.17 (113) – 15.14 (104)	Shaun Walker (Lame) & Josh Richardson (BDT)
2008	Lameroo	Border Downs/Tintinara	17.17 (119) – 13.9 (87)	Josh Richardson (BDT)
2009	Lameroo	Border Downs/Tintinara	14.8 (92) – 8.7 (55)	Ben Greiger (Lame)
2010	Border Downs/Tintinara	Karoonda Districts	20.20 (140) – 7.4 (46)	Josh Keller (BDT)
2011	Border Downs/Tintinara	Murrayville	14.11 (95) – 12.6 (78)	Corey Knight (Kar)
2012	Border Downs/Tintinara	Karoonda Districts	16.14 (110) – 4.7 (31)	Michael Worsman (M/ville)
2013	Border Downs/Tintinara	Lameroo	14.16 (100) – 8.5 (53)	Patrick Barrett (BDT)
2014	Border Downs/Tintinara	Peake & District	17.9 (111) – 12.7 (79)	Hayden Thorpe (Lame)
2015	Lameroo	Border Downs/Tintinara	15.11 (101) – 12.7 (79)	Patrick Barrett (BDT)
2016	Border Downs/Tintinara	Peake & District	12.17 (89) – 10.9 (69)	Gabe Phillips (Pke)
2017	Peake & District	Pinnaroo	7.11 (53) – 7.6 (48)	Tyson Jenner (Pinn)
2018	Border Downs/Tintinara	Karoonda Districts	14.17 (101) – 6.7 (43)	Alex Stidiford (BDT)
2019	Border Downs/Tintinara	Pinnaroo	10.10 (70) – 8.13 (61)	Nathan Brown (Kar)
2020 season suspended due to COVID-19 pandemic
2021	Border Downs/Tintinara	Pinnaroo	6.8 (44) – 6.6 (42)	Nathan Brown (Kar)
2022	Pinnaroo	Border Downs/Tintinara	9.14 (68) – 4.5 (29)	Ben Moroney (Pinn)

== Season format ==
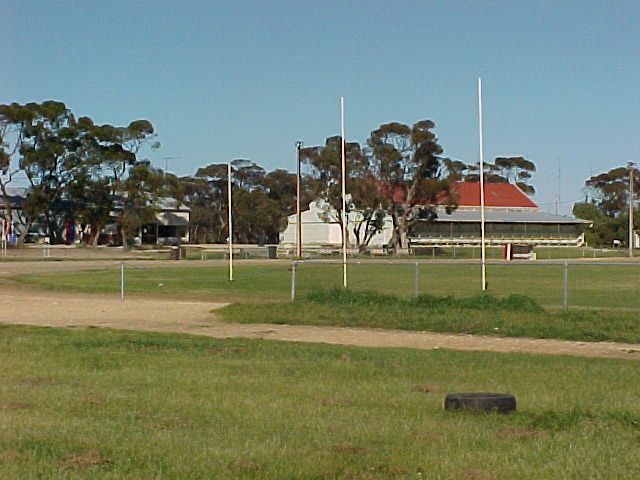
Pinnaroo Showgrounds, home of the Pinnaroo Supa Roos

The Mallee Football League's season usually starts shortly after Easter. The season usually consists of 15 Rounds of three games, always on Saturdays (each team plays every other team three times) and two breaks during the season for the Queens Birthday weekend and the other for the SA Country Carnival. Recently the MFL introduced one night game a year, usually at Murrayville. The finals series is based on a top four system: The top two play each other and the winner goes through to the Grand Final, the loser plays the winner of the match between the 3rd and 4th placed team. then the winner of that game goes through to the grand final. the winner of the Grand Final is declared the premiers.

=== Notable former players ===
AFL Players

- Rodney Maynard, Lameroo FC. Played for Norwood and the Adelaide Crows.
- Nathan Brown, Pinnaroo FC. Played for West Adelaide and the Melbourne Demons
- Trent Sporn, Murrayville FC. Played for North Adelaide and the Carlton Blues.
- Martin Mattner, Peake & District FC. Played for Sturt, the Adelaide Crows, and the Sydney Swans. Premiership coach for Sturt (2016-17).
- Sam Durdin, Karoonda FC. Played for North Melbourne and Carlton.
- Tom Keough, Pinnaroo FC. Premiership player with West Adelaide, and a rookie with the Gold Coast Suns in 2016.

== Books ==
- Encyclopedia of South Australian country football clubs / compiled by Peter Lines. ISBN 9780980447293
- South Australian country football digest / by Peter Lines ISBN 9780987159199
