= Korong =

Korong may refer to:

- Shire of Korong, a former local government area in Victoria, Australia
- Korong Vale, Victoria, a town within the Shire of Korong
- Korong Vale railway station, a former railway station in the town
- Electoral district of Korong, the state parliamentary electorate for the area
- Korong Station, a pastoral lease in the Goldfields of Western Australia.
- Mount Korong, the former name of the town of Wedderburn, Victoria
