= Wedderburn railway station =

Former railway station in Victoria, Australia

Coordinates: 36°25′09″S 143°36′25″E

Wedderburn

General information
- Line: Robinvale
- Platforms: 1
- Tracks: 1

Other information
- Status: Closed

Services
Preceding station	Disused railways	Following station
Inglewood	Robinvale line	Korong Vale
	List of closed railway stations in Victoria	
Location

Wedderburn is a former railway station, serving the town of Wedderburn, Victoria, Australia. It was the only station on a short branch line from the Robinvale railway line, the junction itself being named Wedderburn Junction.

The passenger platform was shortened from 35.5m to 6m in 1976.
