= Inglewood railway station =

Former railway station in Victoria, Australia

Coordinates: 36°34′26″S 143°52′02″E

Inglewood

General information
- Line: Robinvale
- Platforms: 1
- Tracks: 1

Other information
- Status: Closed

Services
Preceding station	Disused railways	Following station
Dunolly	Robinvale line	Wedderburn
Junction	Eaglehawk - Inglewood line	Bridgewater
	List of closed railway stations in Victoria	
Location

Inglewood is a closed railway station on the Robinvale railway line in Victoria, Australia. Currently freight trains go past the station on freight duties up to Boort and Quambatook. Passenger services ended in 1978.
