= Charlton railway station, Victoria =

Former railway station in Victoria, Australia

Coordinates: 36°16′00″S 143°21′08″E

Charlton
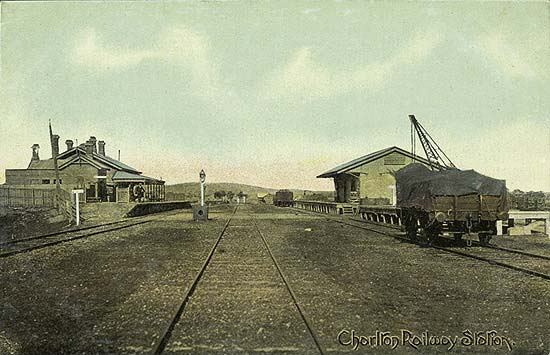
- The station c. 1910, with three tracks running between passenger and goods shed platforms

General information
- Line: Kulwin
- Platforms: 1
- Tracks: 1

Other information
- Status: Closed

Services
Preceding station	Disused railways	Following station
Korong Vale	Kulwin line	Wycheproof
	List of closed railway stations in Victoria	
Location

Charlton is a closed railway station on the Kulwin railway line, located in the town of Charlton, Victoria, Australia. The platform remains intact although it is unused, with freight trains passing through on the way to Sea Lake and other destinations north.

Charlton is located in the northwest of Victoria, 254 km from Melbourne. The first settlers, Robert Cay and William Kaye, gave the area its name in 1848, likely naming it for the village of Charlton Marshall in Greenwich, England. Their run was divided into East Charlton and West Charlton, separated by the Avoca River, with each section governed by different commissioners of crown lands. When a town developed on the eastern side of the river, it became known as East Charlton. In 1863, an inn was built, and by 1867, a bridge was constructed across the Avoca River, facilitating the spread of the settlement to both sides of the riverbank. This rendered the name "East Charlton" redundant, but it retained that name until 1879, following the renaming of another town formerly called Charlton to Chute.

In the 1870s, large landholdings were opened to selectors, leading to the establishment of widespread grain-growing and the construction of two flour mills in the area. The Shire of Charlton was created on 28 May 1895, and in 1897, the Shire issued a commemorative medal for Queen Victoria's Diamond Jubilee, with C.A. Foreman serving as Shire President and E.F. Gilchrist as Shire Secretary. Today, Charlton is primarily known for its large grain silos, reflecting the focus of its local industry. Additionally, it hosts the largest beef cattle feedlot in Victoria, with wool and fat lamb production also contributing significantly to the local economy.

In 1986 the grain loading facilities were declared a Central Receiving Point, and thus upgraded such that 20 VHGY bogie grain wagons could be loaded with grain; the new sidings were constructed on a slope so that each wagon could be loaded then pushed with gravity assistance, without needing a rail tractor or locomotive to shunt the yard. Two new steel silos were provided, each with 10,000 m^{3} (350,000 cu ft) grain capacity, providing a loading capacity of 480 t (470 long tons; 530 short tons) per hour.
