= Eaglehawk–Inglewood railway line =

Railway line in Australia

Eaglehawk – Inglewood

Overview
- Status: disused
- Stations: 3

Service
- Type: Branch

History
- Opened: 1876
- Closed: 25th May 2007

Technical
- Line length: 50 kilometres
- Number of tracks: 1

The Eaglehawk–Inglewood line is a disused railway line in northern Victoria, Australia. It links the Piangil line to the Manangatang and Sea Lake lines and was opened in 1876.

== Operations ==
The line operated using the Train Order Working system of safeworking. A crossing loop was provided at Bridgewater. The maximum speed limit was 50 km/h, with all mainline locomotives permitted, albeit with some speed restrictions.

The line was booked out of service in May 2007, but the last train service/excursion to use the line was in October 2008, with R761 and T356 hauling a 'Steaming Up Broadway' Tour to Wycheproof and then heading to Newport via the line to Eaglehawk. Flooding in January 2011 resulted in damage to bridges and ballast washaways on several sections of track, which had not been repaired as of July 2018.

Sections of rail near Bridgewater have been pulled up to be reused in several standard gauge conversion projects in that part of Victoria.

As of December 2022, the junction at Eaglehawk was disconnected from the Swan Hill line and ripped up, with the line no longer able to be accessed.

== Locations ==
Location	Distance From Melbourne
Eaglehawk	170.11 km
Marong	181.05 km
Leichardt	188.79 km
Derby	195.40 km
Bridgewater	203.45 km
Inglewood	210.629 km
