= Kulwin railway station =

Railway station in Victoria, Australia

Coordinates: 35°01′53″S 142°37′53″E

Kulwin

General information
- Line: Kulwin
- Platforms: 1
- Tracks: 1

Other information
- Status: Demolished

Services
| Preceding station | Disused railways | Following station |
|---|---|---|
| Sea Lake | Kulwin line | Terminus |
| | List of closed railway stations in Victoria | |
Location

Kulwin is terminus of the Kulwin line in Victoria, Australia. The original station was demolished in 1973, and only a mound exists of the original station today. However, grain silos are provided at this location.
