= Eric Chalmers =

Australian rules footballer

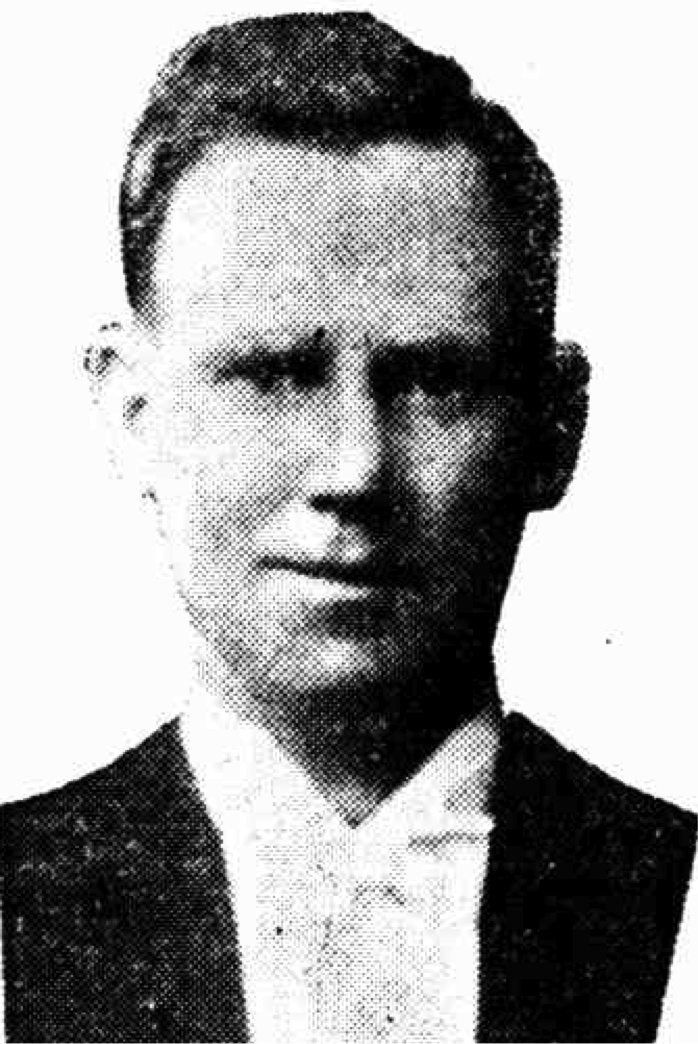

Personal information
- Full name: Eric Henry Chalmers
- Born: 29 November 1900; Boort, Victoria
- Died: 14 September 1930 (aged 29); Perth, Western Australia
- Height: 168 cm (5 ft 6 in)

Playing career
Years	Club	Games (Goals)
1921–1923; 1926	South Fremantle	?
1924	Richmond	6 (4)

Eric Henry Chalmers (29 November 1900 – 14 September 1930) was an Australian rules footballer who played with South Fremantle in the West Australian Football League (WAFL) and Richmond in the Victorian Football League (VFL).

== Biography ==
=== Early life and family ===
Born on 29 November 1900 in Victoria, Chalmers was one of four children. Their maternal grandfather was a Scottish blacksmith, from Dundee, who came to Clunes, Victoria in 1854 to search for gold.

His father, Alexander James Chalmers (known as James), was a wheat farmer, who moved the family to Fremantle, Western Australia soon after Eric's birth. James Chalmers became well known in the area as the proprietor of the Fremantle Foundry and later became a local councillor. In his younger years, Chalmers had been a Footscray footballer.

Christina Frances Chalmers, Eric's mother, died in 1917, as did one of his brothers William Fraser Chalmers, killed in action on the Western Front.

When not playing football, Chalmers worked as an engineer.

=== Football career ===
Chalmers started his football career in the West Australian Football League, where he played for South Fremantle, as a rover and in the forward-line. Graduating from the juniors in 1921, Chalmers played senior football for South Fremantle until 1924, when he was cleared to Richmond at the beginning of the 1924 VFL season.

Chalmers, who wore number 23 for Richmond, debuted in round two against Geelong at Corio Oval and played five further senior games in what would be his only season of VFL football.

He rejoined South Fremantle midway through the 1926 WAFL season and played for a short time.

=== Stabbing death ===
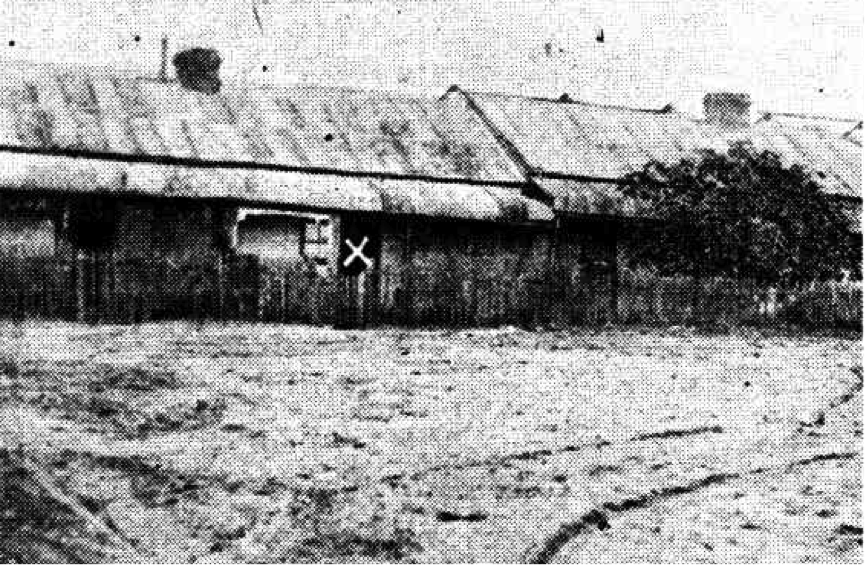
The "sand patch" on Fitzgerald Street

On the night of 13 September 1930, Chalmers was stabbed during a confrontation with a 55-year-old hawker, Maurice Alexander, near West Perth's Clarendon Hotel, in an area known locally as the "sand patch". Earlier in the night, Chalmers had eaten dinner at the hotel and it was there that he met George Maloney, with whom he walked to the sand patch, a vacant block on Fitzgerald Street. The pair were there to search for Maloney's hat, which had been lost when Maloney was involved in a fight that afternoon, with a man named Bob Brown. At the scene, Chalmers began talking to Alexander, who had an adjoining property, which they both headed to. Maloney eventually gave up on finding his hat and went over to Chalmers, who was by then involved in a fight with Alexander on the verandah. Maloney intervened and was stabbed by Alexander with a table knife, along with Chalmers. Both Chalmers and Maloney, the latter with non life-threatening injuries, fled towards the Clarendon Hotel, where they were given medical assistance by the manager, before being taken to hospital.

At the hospital, Chalmers made a deposition, in which he identified Alexander as the man who stabbed him.

Chalmers, who had suffered wounds to his arm and abdomen, died of his injuries the following day.

Alexander was found guilty of manslaughter and sentenced to six year imprisonment, which was less than would have been imposed had the jury not recommended mercy, on account of "extreme provocation". It was argued by the crown by Chalmers had struck Alexander because he believed he was "behaving indecently".

At the time of his death, Chalmers had been employed as a foreman with Shell Oil, a job he had held since returning to Western Australia.
