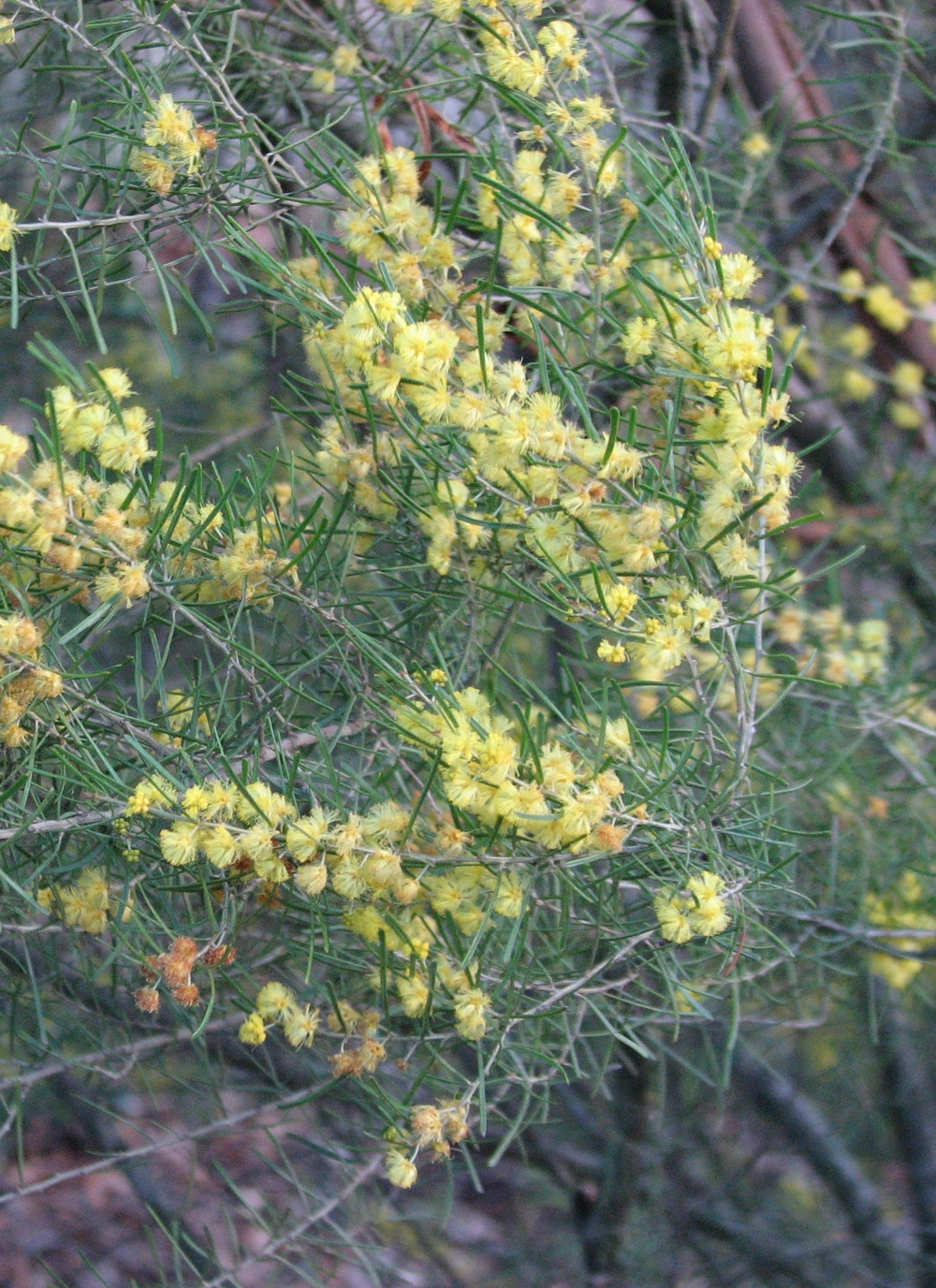

Scientific classification
- Kingdom: Plantae
- Clade: Tracheophytes
- Clade: Angiosperms
- Clade: Eudicots
- Clade: Rosids
- Order: Fabales
- Family: Fabaceae
- Subfamily: Caesalpinioideae
- Clade: Mimosoid clade
- Genus: Acacia
- Species: A. flexifolia

Binomial name
- Acacia flexifolia A.Cunn. ex. Benth.
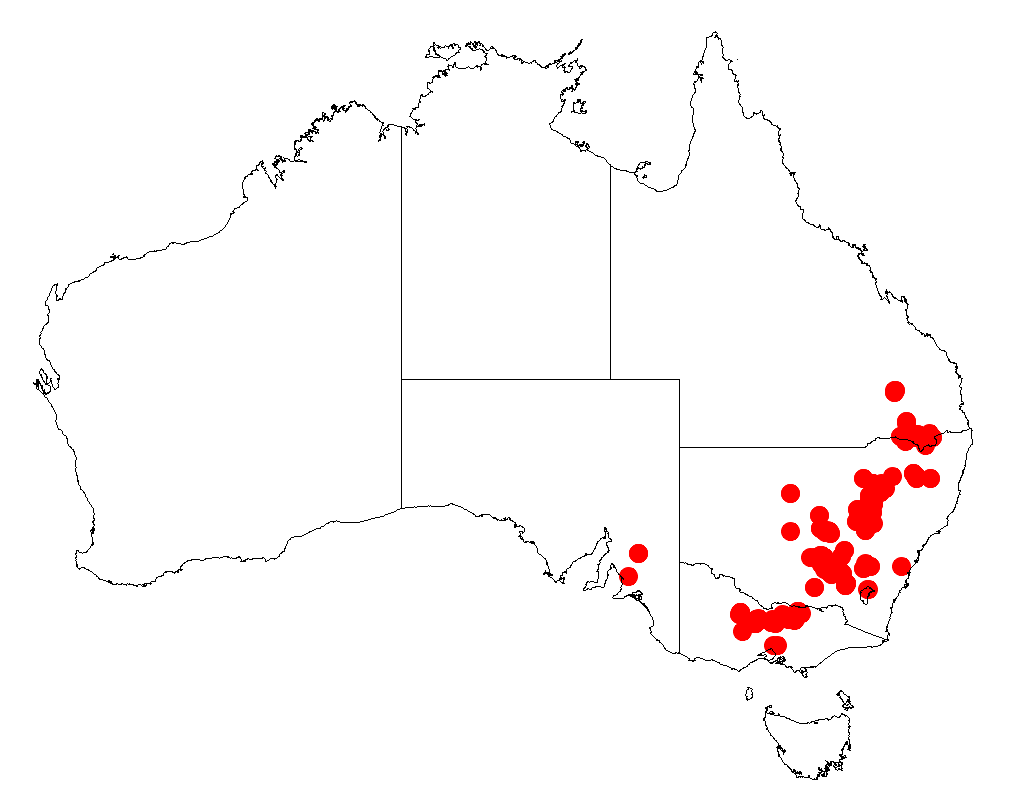
- Occurrence data from AVH

Synonyms
- Racosperma flexifolium (Benth.) Pedley

= Acacia flexifolia =

Bent-leaf wattle

Species of legume

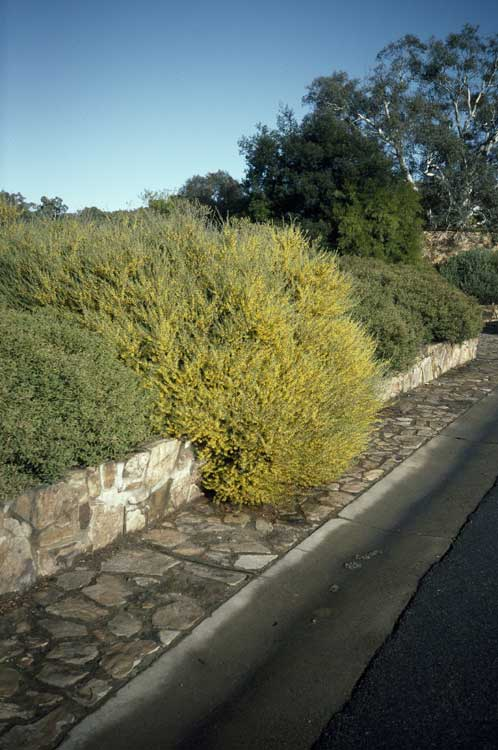
Habit in the ANBG

Acacia flexifolia, commonly known as bent-leaf wattle, bent-leaved wattle or small winter wattle, is a species of flowering plant in the family Fabaceae and is endemic to the east coast of Australia. It is a low-lying or spreading shrub with ascending to erect, linear to narrowly linear or lance-shaped phyllodes with the narrower end towards the base, spherical heads of pale yellow or lemon yellow flowers and narrowly linear, thinly leathery, curved pods.

== Description ==
Acacia flexifolia is a low-lying, spreading to bushy shrub that typically grows to a height of 0.3–1.5 m (1 ft 0 in – 4 ft 11 in) and has a branchlets angled at the ends with tiny hairs pressed against the surface between resinous ridges. Its phyllodes are ascending to erect, linear to narrowly linear or lance-shaped phyllodes with the narrower end towards the base, 10–25 mm (0.39–0.98 in) long, 1.2–2 mm (0.047–0.079 in) wide and glabrous. The midrib in markedly raised and very near the lower edge of the phyllodes. The flowers are usually borne in two spherical heads in axils, on a peduncles 2–4 mm (0.079–0.157 in) long, each head with three to ten pale yellow or lemon yellow flowers. Flowering usually occurs between June and September, and the pods are narrowly linear, thinly leather and curved, up to 100 mm (3.9 in) long and 2–3 mm (0.079–0.118 in) wide, brown and glabrous. The seeds are oblong, 4–5 mm (0.16–0.20 in) long and shiny brown with an aril on the end.

== Taxonomy ==
Acacia flexifolia was first formally described in 1842 by the botanist George Bentham in Hooker's London Journal of Botany after an unpublished description by Allan Cunningham. The specific epithet (flexifolia) means 'bent or curved leaves'.

== Distribution and habitat ==
Bent-leaf wattle is scattered along the inland slopes of the Great Dividing Range and adjacent plains from near Miles in Queensland through central western New South Wales to Wedderburn in Victoria where it usually grows in open forest, woodland or mallee scrub in shallow soil.

== See also ==
- List of Acacia species
