= Korong Vale railway station =

Former railway station in Victoria, Australia

Coordinates: 36°21′22″S 143°42′18″E

Korong Vale
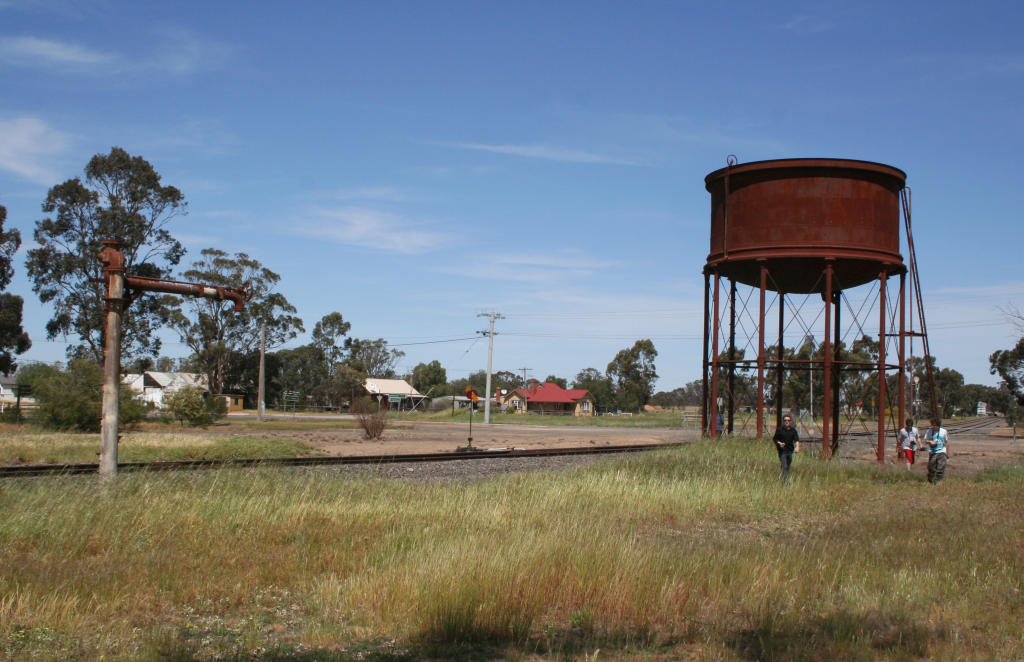
- Water tank and standpipe at the junction, looking up the line, points for the crossing loop are in the foreground.

General information
- Location: Australia
- Lines: Robinvale, Kulwin
- Tracks: 1

Other information
- Status: Closed

Services
Preceding station	Disused railways	Following station
Wedderburn	Robinvale line	Boort
Junction	Kulwin line	Charlton
	List of closed railway stations in Victoria	
Location

Korong Vale is a demolished railway station, located at the junction of the Robinvale and Kulwin railway lines, in the township of Korong Vale, Victoria, Australia. Only freight trains use the line though the station.

At the peak of operations, the station had an island platform with footbridge access, two signal boxes, a marshalling yard, goods platform and shed, and a weighbridge. Rationalisation was carried out in the 1980s.

At the southern (Melbourne) end of the station site is a passing loop, while at the northern end is the junction of the two lines. A water tower and standpipe for steam locomotives is also located at the station.

During rationalisation, on 30 June 1987, the staff and ticket between Korong Vale and Charlton/Wycheproof was replaced with electric staff.
