= Berriwillock railway station =

Former railway station in Victoria, Australia

Coordinates: 35°38′07″S 142°59′44″E

Berriwillock

General information
- Line: Kulwin
- Platforms: 1
- Tracks: 1

Other information
- Status: Closed

Services
Preceding station	Disused railways	Following station
Wycheproof	Kulwin line	Sea Lake
	List of closed railway stations in Victoria	
Location

Berriwillock is a closed railway station on the Kulwin railway line, Victoria, Australia. The platform remains in a reasonable condition, though shelter is very limited. A telephone is also provided at the station.
