= Boort railway station =

Former railway station in Victoria, Australia

Coordinates: 36°06′22″S 143°43′19″E

Boort
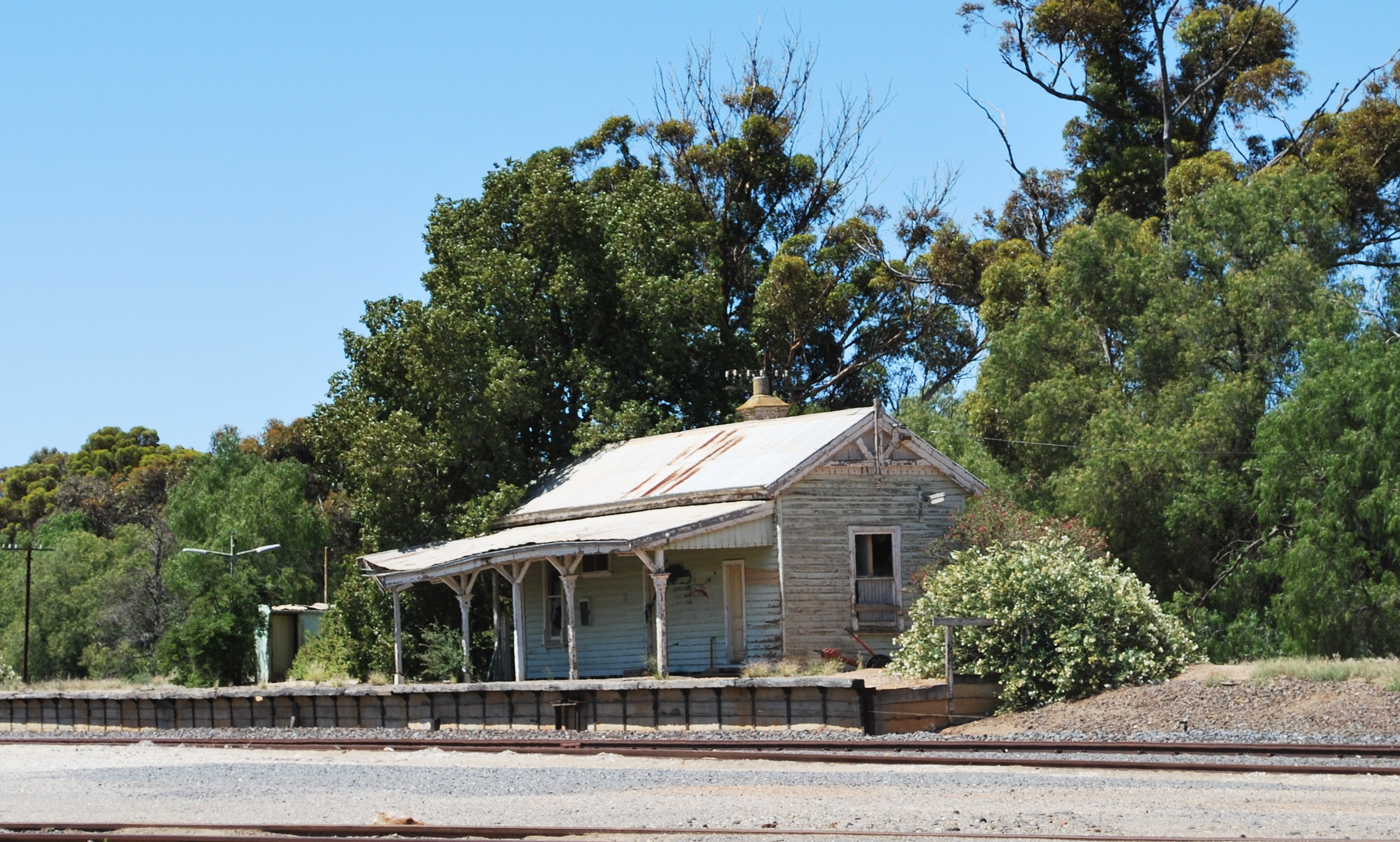
- Station building, 2009

General information
- Line: Robinvale
- Platforms: 1
- Tracks: 1

Other information
- Status: Closed

History
- Opened: 2 July 1883

Services
Preceding station	Disused railways	Following station
Korong Vale	Robinvale line	Quambatook
	List of closed railway stations in Victoria	
Location

Boort railway station is a closed and unused railway station located on the Robinvale railway line at Boort, Victoria, Australia. There are no passenger services to the station, but it is passed by freight trains to there and Quambatook.
