= Quambatook railway station =

Former railway station in Victoria, Australia

Coordinates: 35°51′02″S 143°31′10″E

Quambatook

General information
- Line: Robinvale
- Platforms: 1
- Tracks: 1

Other information
- Status: Closed

Services
Preceding station	Disused railways	Following station
Boort	Robinvale line	Gowanford
	List of closed railway stations in Victoria	
Location

Quambatook is a disused railway station on the Robinvale railway line.
