= Ernie Vernon =

Australian rules footballer

Personal information
- Full name: Ernest Alfred Vernon
- Born: 3 September 1895; Korong Vale, Victoria
- Died: 31 January 1949 (aged 53); Rockbank, Victoria
- Original team: Leitchville

Playing career^{1}
Years	Club	Games (Goals)
1920	St Kilda	3 (0)
- ^{1} Playing statistics correct to the end of 1920.

Ernest Alfred Vernon (3 September 1895 – 31 January 1949) was an Australian rules footballer who played with St Kilda in the Victorian Football League (VFL).
