= Sea Lake railway station =

Former railway station in Victoria, Australia

Coordinates: 35°30′18″S 142°50′49″E

Sea Lake
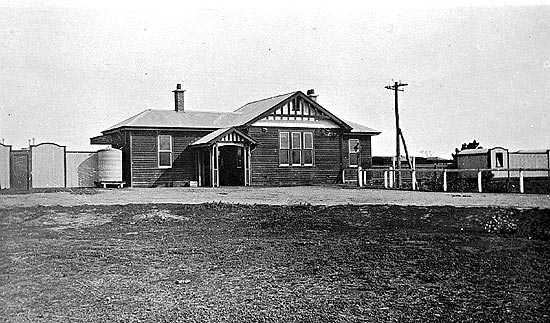
- Street side of the station circa 1920

General information
- Line: Kulwin
- Platforms: 1
- Tracks: 1

Other information
- Status: Closed

Services
Preceding station	Disused railways	Following station
Berriwillock	Kulwin line	Kulwin
	List of closed railway stations in Victoria	
Location

Sea Lake is a closed railway station on the Kulwin railway line located in the town of Sea Lake, Victoria, Australia. The last regular passenger service ran from Bendigo to Sea Lake on 7 May 1977 and was operated by a DERM. It retains a weatherboard building and the passenger platform.

The station is a destination for grain trains operated by companies such as El Zorro, to the AWB GrainFlow terminal.
