= Marong railway station =

Former railway station in Victoria, Australia

Coordinates: 36.7358°S 144.1308°E

Marong

General information
- Line: Eaglehawk–Inglewood
- Tracks: 1

Other information
- Status: Closed

History
- Opened: 19 September 1876; 149 years ago
- Closed: 12 February 1987; 39 years ago

Services
Preceding station	Disused railways	Following station
Leichardt	Eaglehawk - Inglewood line	Eaglehawk
	List of closed railway stations in Victoria	
Location

Marong is a former railway station on the disused Eaglehawk–Inglewood railway line in Victoria, Australia. Opened in 1876, the station remained staffed until around 1979 before being closed in 1987.

== Incidents ==
On 14 September 1888, at approximately 9pm, a passenger train from Sandhurst was struck by a goods train from Inglewood as passengers were alighting at the station. The driver of the goods train, E. Evans, had passed a signal at danger. Seeing an inevitable collision, Norton, the driver of the passenger train, sounded the whistle and immediately backed out to soften the impact of the collision. Several passengers were injured, however no fatalities were recorded. Norton's actions were praised by the passengers as having likely prevented any fatalities from occurring. The engine of the goods train was later sent for testing as Evans had complained about it being uncontrollable. A report considered by the Railway Commissioners blamed Evans for the accident and he was later dismissed.

== Proposed reopening ==
In 2024, the City of Greater Bendigo adopted the Marong Township Structure Plan in which there is a formal proposal to construct a new railway station in Marong to serve the town. The plan identifies a site for a proposed station adjacent to the existing, but currently disused, Eaglehawk–Inglewood line. The proposal is part of a long-term plan for the township to accommodate a population of up to 8,000 people. The station site is located within a planned mixed-use precinct where medium-density residential development is encouraged. The implementation of the station is listed as a long-term infrastructure project, and its delivery would be subject to a future approved business case and state government funding.
