= Bridgewater railway station, Victoria =

Former railway station in Victoria, Australia

Coordinates: 36.6023°S 143.9458°E

Bridgewater

General information
- Line: Eaglehawk–Inglewood
- Tracks: 1

Other information
- Status: Closed

History
- Opened: 19 September 1876; 150 years ago
- Closed: 25 May 2007; 19 years ago

Services
Preceding station	Disused railways	Following station
Inglewood	Eaglehawk - Inglewood line	Derby
	List of closed railway stations in Victoria	
Location

Bridgewater is a closed railway station on the disused Eaglehawk–Inglewood railway line in Victoria, Australia. Opened in 1876, the station remained in operation until the line was abolished in 2007.
