= Boort Secondary College =

Coordinates: 36°06′35″S 143°43′37.5″E

- Boort, Victoria; Australia

Information
- School type: Public, co-educational, secondary day school
- Motto: Who Rises High Sees Far
- Grades: 7–12
- Enrolment: ~200
- Website: www.boortsc.vic.edu.au/

Boort District School F12 is a state school located in the town of Boort which is located next to Lake Boort, in the Shire of Loddon.

== About the school ==
Boort District School is a Foundation to Year 12 school.

Like most rural schools, Boort District School is designated a school which is under-represented in the university undergraduate population, and its students can apply for special eligibility. Additionally, universities such as Flinders University, offer bonus points for university access to students from rural and isolated areas.

== History ==
The current F12 school was formed from the amalgamation of the Boort Primary School and the Boort High School.
