= Leichardt railway station =

Former railway station in Victoria, Australia

Coordinates: 36.6906°S 144.0667°E

Leichardt

General information
- Line: Eaglehawk–Inglewood
- Tracks: 1

Other information
- Status: Closed

History
- Opened: 19 September 1876; 149 years ago
- Closed: 25 May 2007; 19 years ago

Services
Preceding station	Disused railways	Following station
Derby	Eaglehawk - Inglewood line	Marong
	List of closed railway stations in Victoria	
Location

Leichardt is a closed railway station on the disused Eaglehawk–Inglewood railway line in Victoria, Australia. Opened in 1876, the station remained staffed until 1939, with passenger services being terminated on 6 May 1963. A siding for goods remained at the site before the line was abolished in 2007.
