= Derby railway station, Victoria =

Former railway station in Victoria, Australia

Coordinates: 36.6474°S 144.0141°E

Derby

General information
- Line: Eaglehawk–Inglewood
- Tracks: 1

Other information
- Status: Closed

History
- Opened: 19 September 1876; 149 years ago
- Closed: 1 April 1972; 54 years ago

Services
Preceding station	Disused railways	Following station
Bridgewater	Eaglehawk - Inglewood line	Leichardt
	List of closed railway stations in Victoria	
Location

Derby is a closed railway station on the disused Eaglehawk–Inglewood railway line in Victoria, Australia. Opened in 1876, the station remained staffed until 1954, with passenger services being terminated on 8 June 1959. A siding for goods remained at the site before the station was closed to all traffic on 1 April 1972, with the siding abolished three days later.
