= Wycheproof railway station =

Former railway station in Victoria, Australia

Coordinates: 36°04′55″S 143°13′41″E

Wycheproof
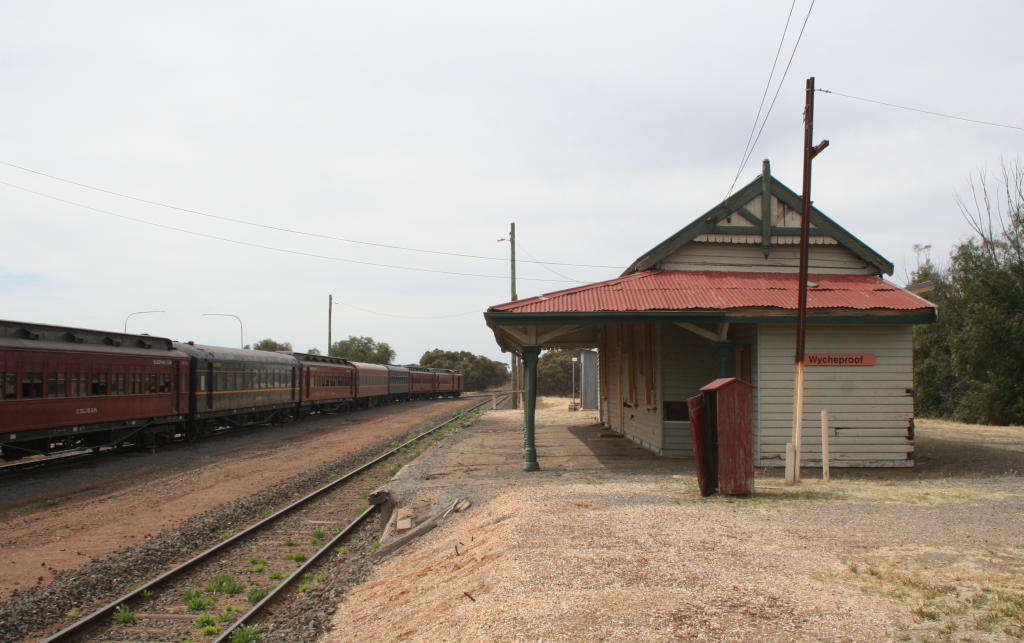
- The station with a Steamrail Victoria train, 2008

General information
- Line: Kulwin
- Platforms: 1
- Tracks: 1

Other information
- Status: Closed

Services
Preceding station	Disused railways	Following station
Charlton	Kulwin line	Berriwillock
	List of closed railway stations in Victoria	
Location

Wycheproof is a closed railway station on the Kulwin line in Wycheproof, Victoria, Australia. The line that runs through the town, partly on the road is unique in Victoria, as it runs through the middle of the main street. Freight trains pass through the station on their way to various locations along the line.

A number of home signals at the station were abolished on 5 January 1994.

The station and platform were renovated in 2010, the goods shed in 2015 and the 70' long turntable that has been leased to Steamrail Victoria, was re-opened it to rail traffic in 2021. K class steam locomotive K167 is also statically preserved in a nearby park.

== Gallery ==
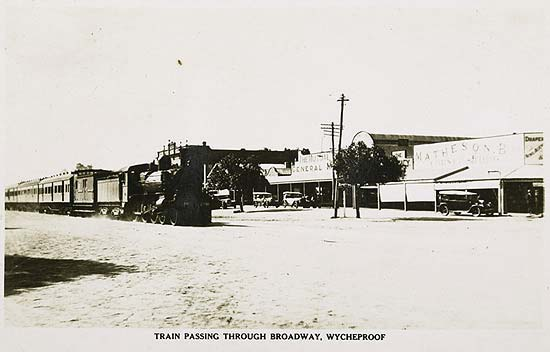
Train headed down the main street of Broadway
