= Wedderburn Junction =

- Town
- Coordinates: 36°25′26″S 143°41′15″E
- Country: Australia
- State: Victoria
- LGA: Shire of Loddon

Government
  - State electorate: Ripon
  - Federal division: Mallee

Population
  - Total: 20 (2021 census)
- Postcode: 3518

Wedderburn Junction is a locality in the Shire of Loddon, Victoria, Australia. At the 2021 census, Wedderburn Junction had a population of 20.
