= Avoca River =

River in Victoria, Australia

Avoca
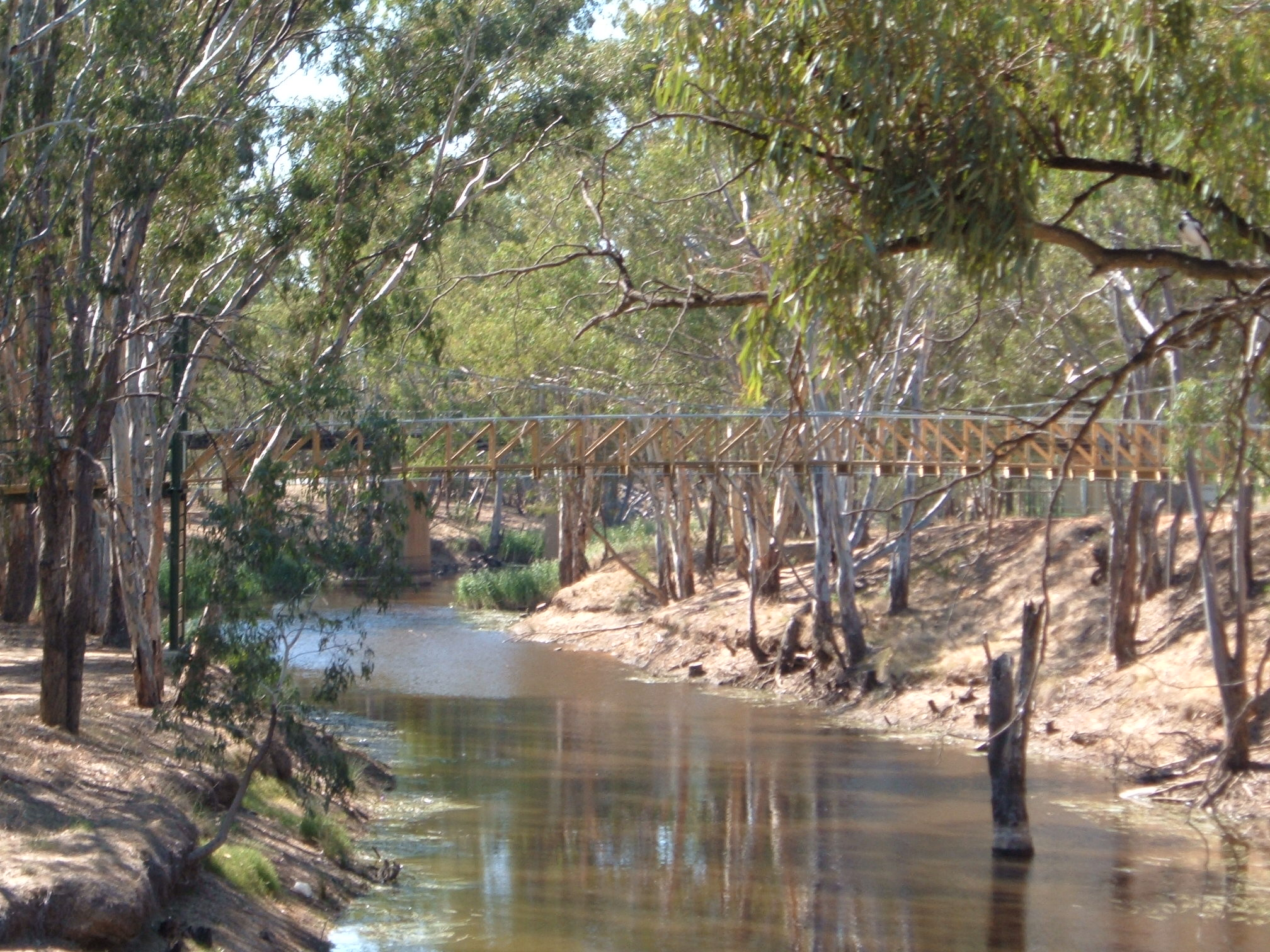
- Avoca River at Charlton

- Course of the Avoca River
- Native name: Natte yaluk, Boca, Bangyeno Banip, Djub-djub-galg, Witchelliba, Yangeba

Location
- Country: Australia
- State: Victoria
- Region: Riverina bioregion (IBRA), Central Highlands, Wimmera
- Local government areas: Buloke, Gannawarra
- Towns: Avoca, Logan, Charlton, Quambatook

Physical characteristics
- Source: Pyrenees Ranges, Great Dividing Range
  - location: below Mount Lonarch
  - coordinates: 37°14′03″S 143°24′21″E
  - elevation: 307 m (1,007 ft)
- Mouth: Lake Bael Bael, Kerang Lakes
  - location: Kerang
  - coordinates: 35°41′57″S 143°44′32″E
  - elevation: 74 m (243 ft)
- Length: 270 km (170 mi)
- Basin size: 12,352 km^{2} (4,769 sq mi)
- Discharge
  - average: 5 m^{3}/s (180 cu ft/s)

Basin features
- River system: North–central catchment, Murray-Darling basin
- Tributaries
  - left: Glenlogie Creek, Number Two Creek, Mountain Creek (Victoria), Cherry Tree Creek, Smoky Creek, Tarpaulin Creek, Campbell Creek (Victoria)
  - right: Sandy Creek (Victoria), Brown Hill Creek (Victoria), Fentons Creek (Victoria), Sandy Creek (Victoria), Yeungroon Creek, Mosquito Creek (Victoria)

The Avoca River, an inland intermittent river of the north–central catchment, part of the Murray-Darling basin, is located in the lower Riverina bioregion and Central Highlands and Wimmera regions of the Australian state of Victoria. The headwaters of the Avoca River rise on the northern slopes of the Pyrenees Range and descend to flow into the ephemeral Kerang Lakes.

== Features and location ==
The Avoca River drains a substantial part of central Victoria. It rises at the foot of Mount Lonarch, near the small town of Amphitheatre, and flows north for 270 kilometres (170 mi) joined by thirteen minor tributaries, and through the towns of Avoca, Charlton and Quambatook. Two major distributaries leave the Avoca River between Charlton and Quambatook: Tyrrell Creek, flowing to Lake Tyrrell, and Lalbert Creek flowing to Lake Lalbert.

Although the Avoca River basin is part of the Murray-Darling basin, the Avoca River does not empty into the Murray. Nowhere a large stream, it dwindles as it flows north, eventually terminating in the Kerang Lakes, a network of ephemeral swamps west of Kerang and about 20 kilometres (12 mi) south of the Murray River.

Although the Avoca River has a substantial 12,000-square-kilometre (4,600 sq mi) catchment area, the fifth-largest in Victoria, most of that area is on the northern plains where rainfall averages only about 350 millimetres (14 in) per year, and where there is little runoff because the terrain is very flat. The mean annual runoff of 137 gigalitres (30×10^{9} imp gal; 36×10^{9} US gal) per annum accounts for only 0.67% of Victoria's runoff. Most of the water flowing in the Avoca River originates in the small upper portion of the catchment area, where rainfall averages about 600 millimetres (24 in) per year, most of it falling in the winter and spring.

Of all the Victorian rivers in the Murray-Darling basin, the Avoca River is the most variable. The average annual flow is 85 gigalitres (19×10^{9} imp gal; 22×10^{9} US gal), but recorded actual flows have varied from almost five times the average figure in very wet years, when the river can flood, to 0.5% of the average in drought years, when the flow is less than 50 megalitres (11×10^{6} imp gal; 13×10^{6} US gal) per day. In dry years, the flow can stop for many months.

Although it is the only river of significance in the area, no major water storages have been constructed on it, but there are six weirs of only local significance. Little use of the river is made for irrigation because, during the peak demand periods of summer and autumn, it is often not flowing. During low-flow periods, the water is usually too saline to use on crops, but can still provide drinking water for sheep and cattle.

The river is crossed by the Pyrenees Highway at Avoca, and the Borung Highway and the Calder Highway at Charlton.

== Etymology ==
As the river is relatively long, Aboriginal peoples from various cultural groups lived near the river course. In the Djadjawurrung, Wathawurrung, Wergaia, and Wembawemba languages, the river has several names, including Natte yaluk and Boca, both with no clearly defined meaning; Bangyeno Banip, meaning bunyip waterholes; Djub-djub-galg, meaning a place where melaleuca was abundant; Witchelliba, with witji meaning basket grass and bar meaning river; and Yangeba, with no clearly defined meaning.

== See also ==
- List of rivers of Australia § Victoria
