= Charlton, Victoria =

Charlton
- Town
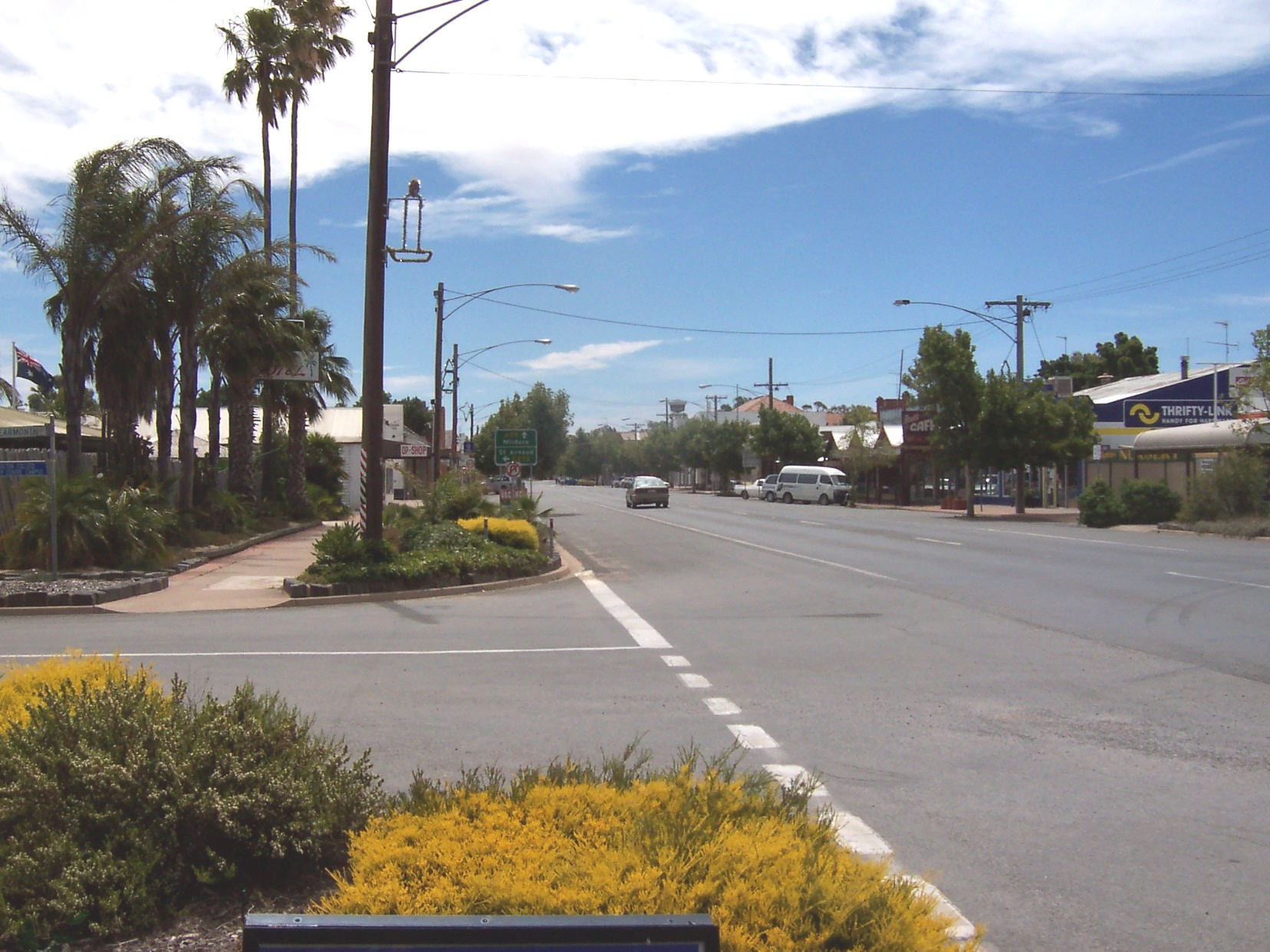
- Charlton's High Street

- Coordinates: 36°16′08″S 143°21′00″E
- Country: Australia
- State: Victoria
- LGA: Shire of Buloke
- Location: 245 km (152 mi) NW of Melbourne; 105 km (65 mi) NW of Bendigo; 305 km (190 mi) SE of Mildura
- Council seat: Auburn

Government
  - State electorate: Mildura
  - Federal division: Mallee
- Elevation: 117 m (384 ft)

Population
  - Total: 1,095 (2021 census)
- Postcode: 3525
- Mean max temp: 21.9 °C (71.4 °F)
- Mean min temp: 8.4 °C (47.1 °F)
- Annual rainfall: 430.7 mm (16.96 in)

Charlton is a town in western Victoria, Australia. It is a small agricultural community straddling the Avoca River, located at the junction of the Calder Highway (A79) and Borung Highway (C239) and positioned in the last of the foothills of the Great Dividing Range. Halfway between Melbourne and Mildura, Charlton is a popular tourist stop. Charlton is host to the OK Motels Music festival held in February.

== History ==
The traditional owners of the region are the Jaara people, part of the Djadjawurrung language group of the Kulin nation. They called the area "Youanduk", meaning a basin in a rock, because there were a number of depressions in the local rocks providing a reliable water supply. The names of surrounding agricultural districts reflect the legacy of the First Nations inhabitants: Barrakee, Buckrabanyule, Woosang, Wooroonook and Yeungroon.

After extensive travels throughout the region by Major Thomas Mitchell, settlement by Europeans commenced in 1848 when the squatters Robert Cay and William Kaye established a station and named the region after Charlton near Greenwich, England. Unlike many other towns in the region, Charlton was not established as a result of gold mining, but for pastoral purposes and the proximity to a permanent water supply provided by the Avoca River. The town was originally named East Charlton due to its location on the eastern banks of the Avoca River, and because another Victoria town was already named Charlton (renamed Chute in 1879). The East Charlton Post Office opened on 21 December 1876 (renamed Charlton in 1879) replacing an earlier (1854) office nearby named Yowen Hill.

The first bridge crossing the river was erected in 1867 by James Paterson, allowing expansion on both sides of the river. Throughout the history of Charlton, the Avoca River has been known for its regular flooding after heavy rain. Floods have often surrounded the town or, on rare occasions, flooded the town itself. Levee banks were constructed to their present levels in the 1950s, but parts of the town were flooded in September 2010. Minor flooding occurred again in December 2010, with the highest-ever recorded flood level inundating the town in January 2011, some homes within the town being inundated by water more than 1.6 metres above floor level.

A prominent landmark is the former hotel, the "Vale of Avoca", built in 1879 by James and Elizabeth Egan, on the site of an early bark hut inn. Constructed on a reef of stone, Mrs Egan named the building as being in the "vale" or valley of the nearby Avoca River. Delicensed as a hotel in 1942, the building was restored in the 1990s and currently provides bed and breakfast.

The first issue of the local newspaper, the Tribune, was published on 20 May 1876, the founders being H. T. Henningsen and his step-son, R. M. Klunder. In 1925, the business was purchased by Messrs Hogan and Gardiner and then followed other proprietors, Herbert Davies and John S. Richardson, and then, after his death in 1954, his widow, Rena M. Richardson. For many years the Tribune was published twice weekly – Wednesdays and Saturdays – but, during World War II, a shortage of staff and paper necessitated the change to weekly publication. In February 1960, Rena Richardson married William Wood and, in 1961, she sold the Tribune to Ian and Coral Cameron. In 1981, the newspaper was sold by the Camerons to the St. Arnaud Mercury, and the Mercury and Tribune were combined to become the North Central News.

Charlton Magistrates' Court closed on 1 January 1983.

== Demographics ==
Charlton is the second largest town in the Shire of Buloke. At the 2021 census, its "suburbs and localities" population, which includes some surrounding areas, was 1,095. Government department downsizing in addition to regional economic decline led to the largest percentage decline in population within Victoria between the mid-1980s and the mid-1990s with an estimated 18.3% loss in population. Recent agricultural developments (such as the AWB Limited facilities), a sharp increase in house prices within larger urban areas, in addition to economic recovery, have resulted in a shift towards stabilisation and a subsequent increase in population. However, more than 60% of all local businesses are for sale or remain closed.

== Economy ==
The economic backbone of Charlton is agriculture and services. Several massive grain silos dominate the town skyline, evidence of the town's rich history in various grains including wheat, canola, oats and barley. Sheep and cattle farming are also prolific with the largest beef feedlot in the state, situated in Yeungroon just south of the town. Recent additions to the region, including an olive farm and winery have diversified the town's agricultural applications.

Major employers in the Charlton area are:

- AWB Limited (Grains)
- Boral (Quarry - Mostly for road aggregate)
- Buloke Shire Council
- Charlton Feedlot (Livestock)
- Charlton P-12 College, Cluster Centre and Saint Joseph's Primary School (Education)
- Graincorp (Grains)
- Lake Marmal Vineyards (Grapes)
- Timbercorp (Olives)

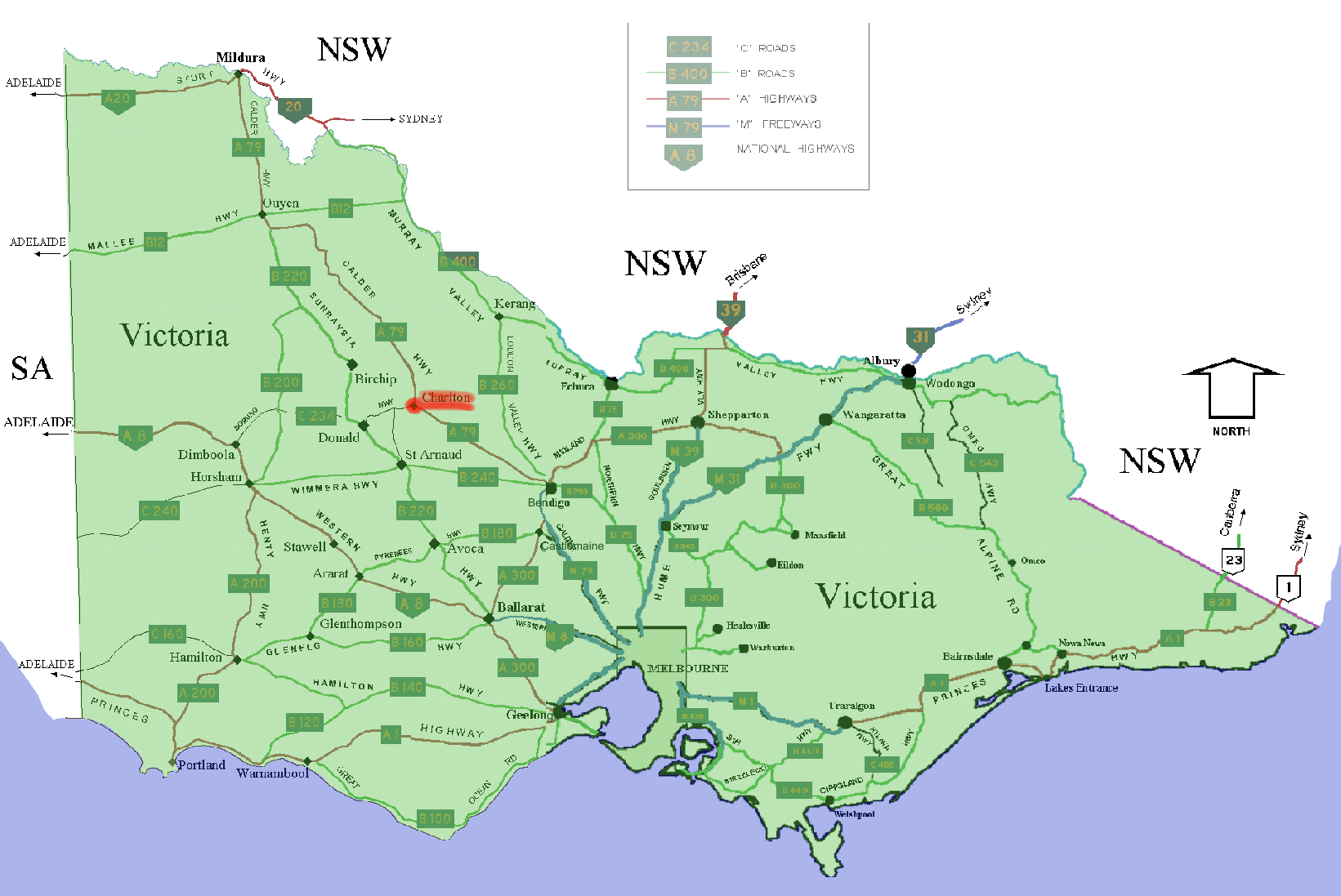
Location of Charlton in Victoria (red)

== Transport ==
Charlton has one public transport connection to Melbourne, a single V/Line coach service serving the town, once a day, five days per week which connects with a train service at Bendigo that goes to Melbourne. Charlton used to have its own railway station on the Kulwin line, although a bare platform remains and no passenger services operate on the line. The line only carries wheat trains.

== Climate ==
Charlton enjoys a temperate Mediterranean style climate, with warm dry summers and cool cloudy winters. Deep blue skies are regular throughout much of the year as are crystal clear starry nights; though winter skies tend to feature low heavy cloud and fog, as evident from the afternoon humidity readings.

Charlton's January average max/min temperatures are 30.4 °C (86.7 °F)/13.8 °C (56.8 °F) and July average max/min temperatures are 13.4 °C (56.1 °F)/3.4 °C (38.1 °F). Annual precipitation is 430.4 mm (16.94") (Source: Bureau of Meteorology ). During the Black Saturday period in 2009, Charlton recorded a temperature of 47.2 °C, just short of the state temperature record of 48.8 °C.

Climate data for Charlton Post Office (1899–1971, rainfall 1882–1976); 117 m AMSL; 36.30° S, 143.40° E
Month	Jan	Feb	Mar	Apr	May	Jun	Jul	Aug	Sep	Oct	Nov	Dec	Year
Mean daily maximum °C (°F)	30.4 (86.7)	30.2 (86.4)	26.7 (80.1)	21.9 (71.4)	17.4 (63.3)	13.9 (57.0)	13.4 (56.1)	15.0 (59.0)	17.1 (62.8)	21.4 (70.5)	25.5 (77.9)	28.7 (83.7)	21.8 (71.2)
Mean daily minimum °C (°F)	13.8 (56.8)	14.3 (57.7)	11.8 (53.2)	8.5 (47.3)	6.0 (42.8)	4.1 (39.4)	3.4 (38.1)	4.0 (39.2)	5.5 (41.9)	7.5 (45.5)	10.0 (50.0)	12.4 (54.3)	8.4 (47.2)
Average precipitation mm (inches)	24.3 (0.96)	27.2 (1.07)	28.4 (1.12)	31.9 (1.26)	42.7 (1.68)	48.1 (1.89)	43.2 (1.70)	45.2 (1.78)	42.6 (1.68)	41.8 (1.65)	28.4 (1.12)	26.8 (1.06)	430.4 (16.94)
Average precipitation days	3.7	3.5	4.0	5.7	8.3	10.0	10.9	11.5	9.2	8.5	5.6	4.6	85.5
Average afternoon relative humidity (%)	30	33	41	48	58	72	68	64	60	47	39	33	50
Source: Australian Bureau of Meteorology

== Facilities ==
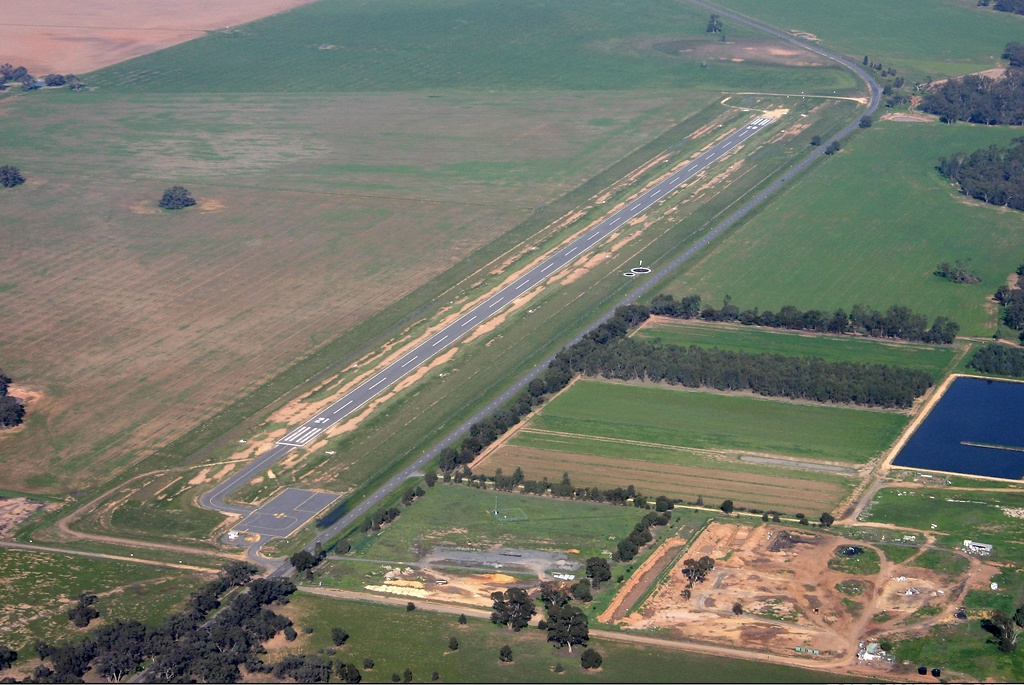
Charlton Airfield overview

Charlton's central location to the North Central region has resulted in the town being the beneficiary of considerable services not typically associated with such small localities.

- Charlton Park provides sporting, recreation, and community facilities, including an Australian rules football and cricket sportsground, netball courts, a hockey field, tennis facilities, and a 9-hole golf course. The complex also includes a harness racing track.
- The Traveller's Rest is an iconic 'toilet block', held very proudly by the locals, situated in the heart of the town within easy walking of shops and restaurants. Containing picnic facilities, a wishing well, gazebo, views of the river, a footbridge across the river, the Traveller's Rest is a regular stop for tourists, the V/Line bus service and various other tour groups.
- The town exhibits education facilities for residents from kindergarten to the end of high school. There is also a cluster centre that is now part of the P-12 Charlton College, providing additional education services for students and further education for adults.
- East Wimmera Health Service has a Charlton campus which comprises a nursing home, an ambulance station, a hospital and the "Charlton Medical" doctors surgery.

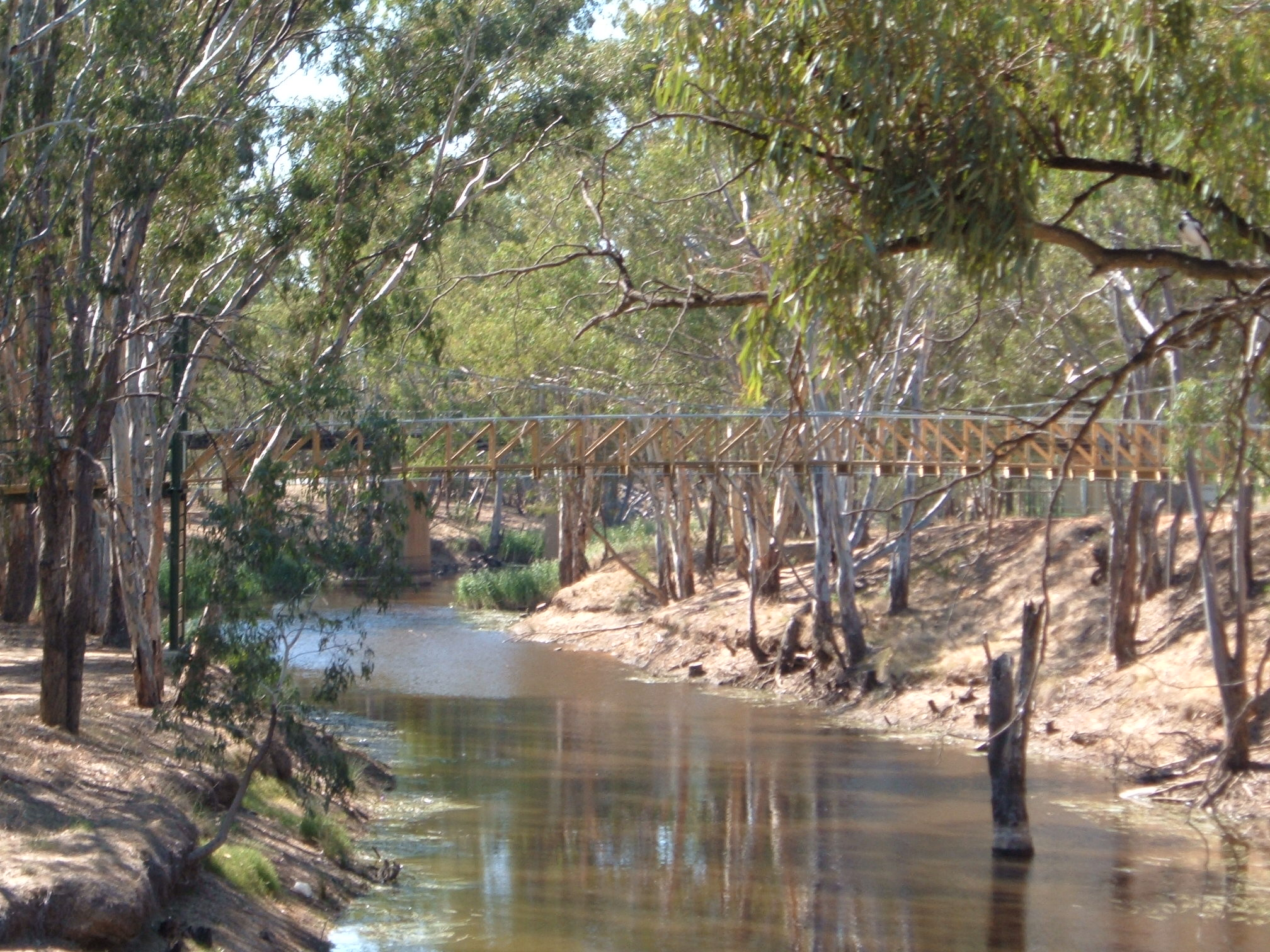
Footbridge over the Avoca River in the centre of Charlton, March 2005

== Recreation and tourism ==
The river winds through the town with trees and parks lining the banks. Along the river is a 2 km walking track connecting High Street to Charlton Park, where sporting and recreational facilities exist.

- The Charlton Golden Grains Museum has information about the town and its history. The museum is open by appointment.
- 2 km west of town is the Charlton golf course. Built in a clover leaf format, containing three arms of six holes each, the golf course is in the nearby Dooboobetic Hills. Kangaroos and other native flora and fauna are seen on the course.
- 5 km southeast of the town, views of the region are to be had from Barrakee Hill, or "Quarry Hill" to the locals.
- 13 km west of the town are the Wooroonook Lakes, which provide camping and boating facilities and are also used for fishing and swimming.
- 25 km east of the town is Wychetella Forest, containing many native animals, including the rare malleefowl.

== Events ==
- Annual Australia Day Tennis Tournament - Held over the Australia Day Long Weekend in January
- Art Show - Held every October
- Charlton A & P Society Annual Show, held the 3rd weekend in October
- Charlton Fishing Competition - Held every November
- Charlton Harness Racing Cup - Held every March
- Redback Rally - Motorcycle rally, held the second weekend of February
- Charlton Film Festival held at the Rex Theatre every February.
- Buloke Shire Council official website
- Charlton weather

== Gallery ==
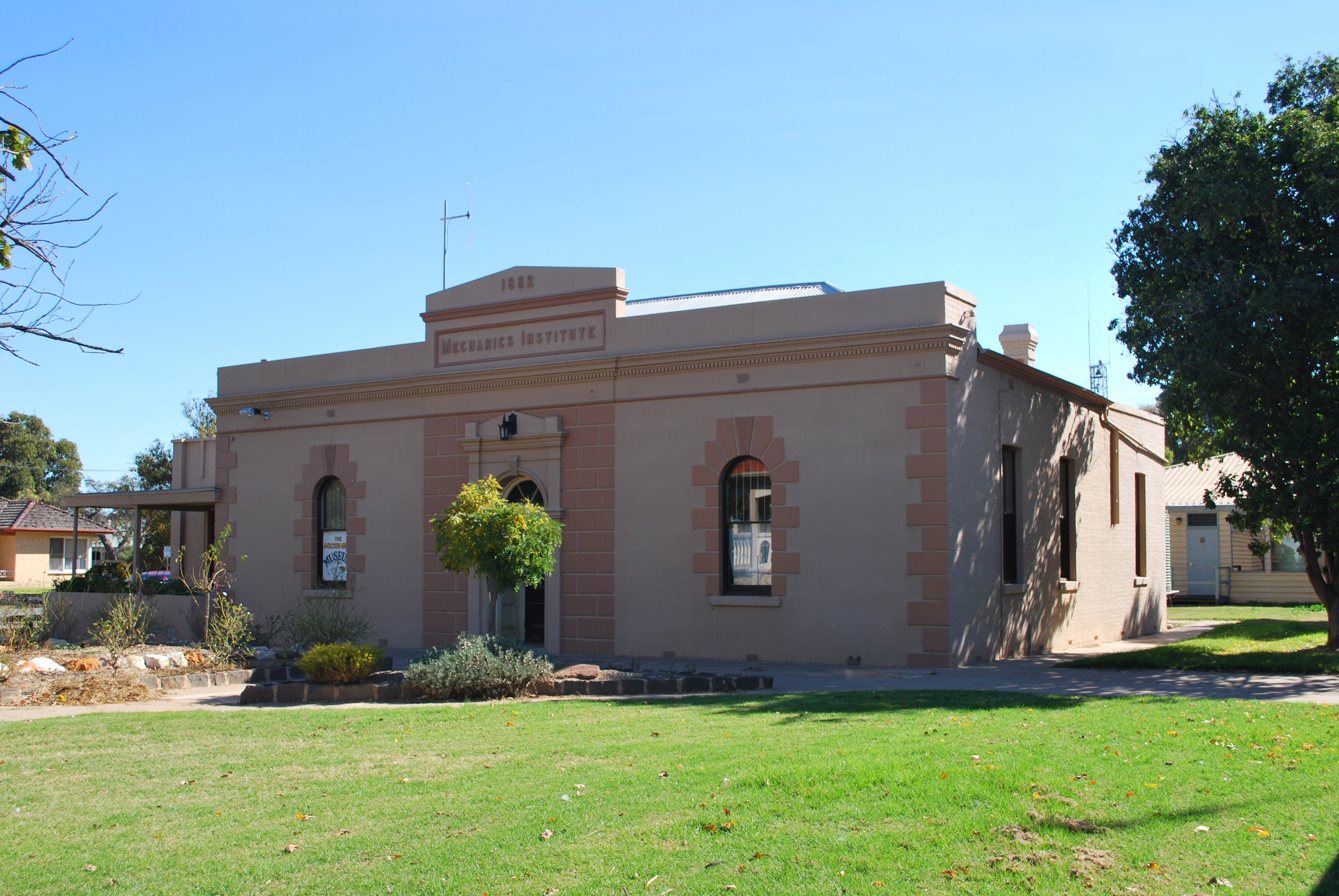
Charlton Mechanics Institute

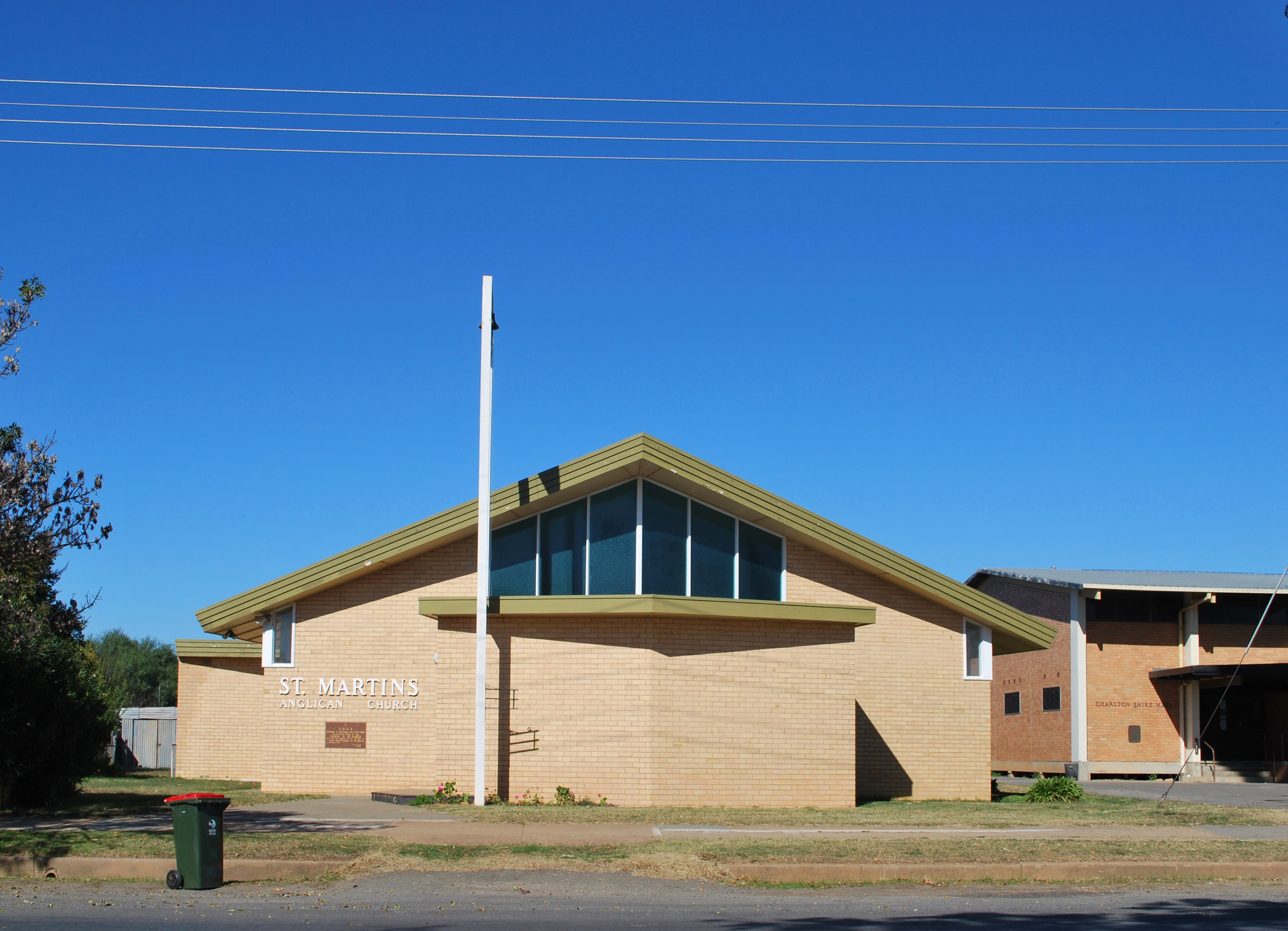
Anglican Church

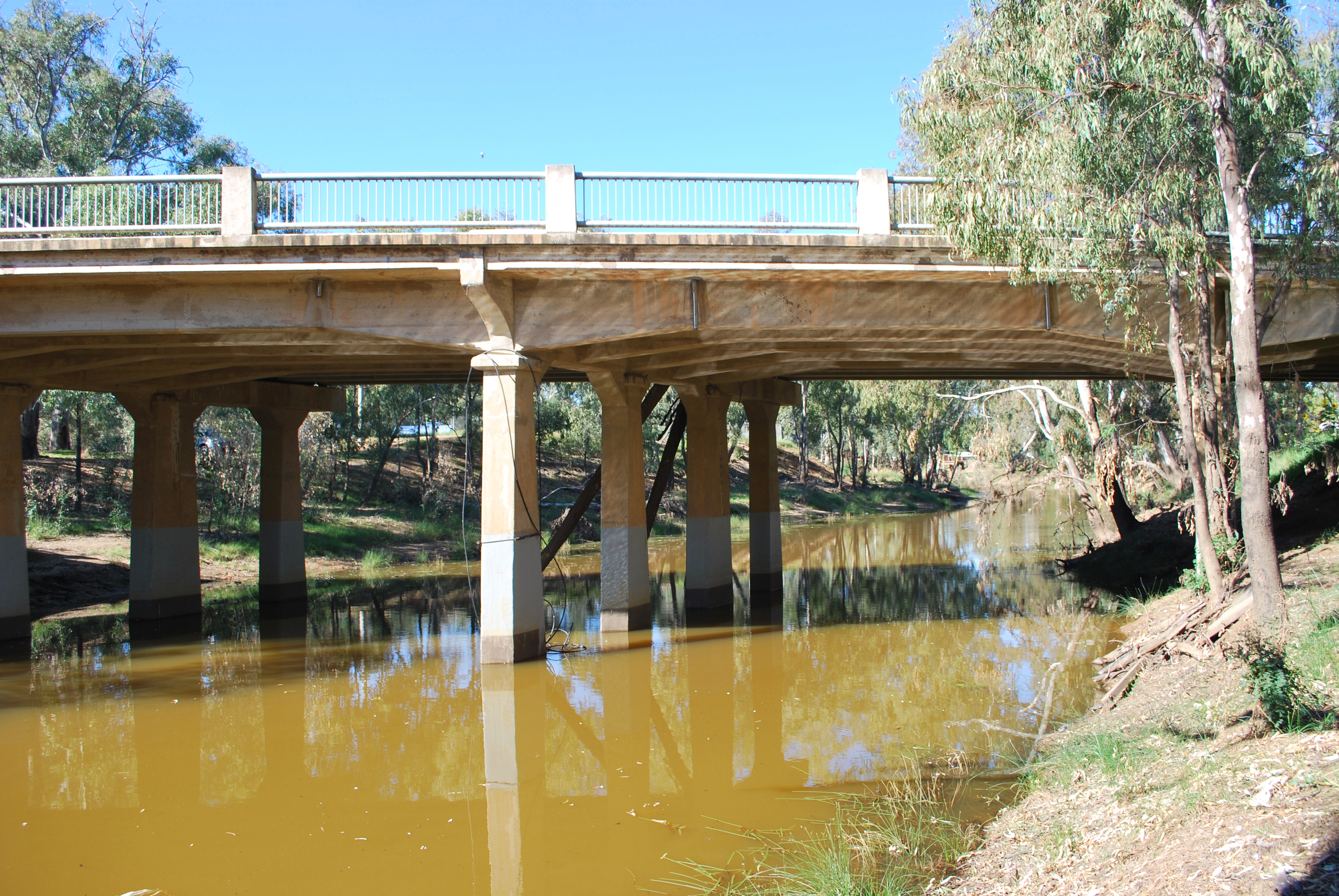
Charlton Avoca River Bridge

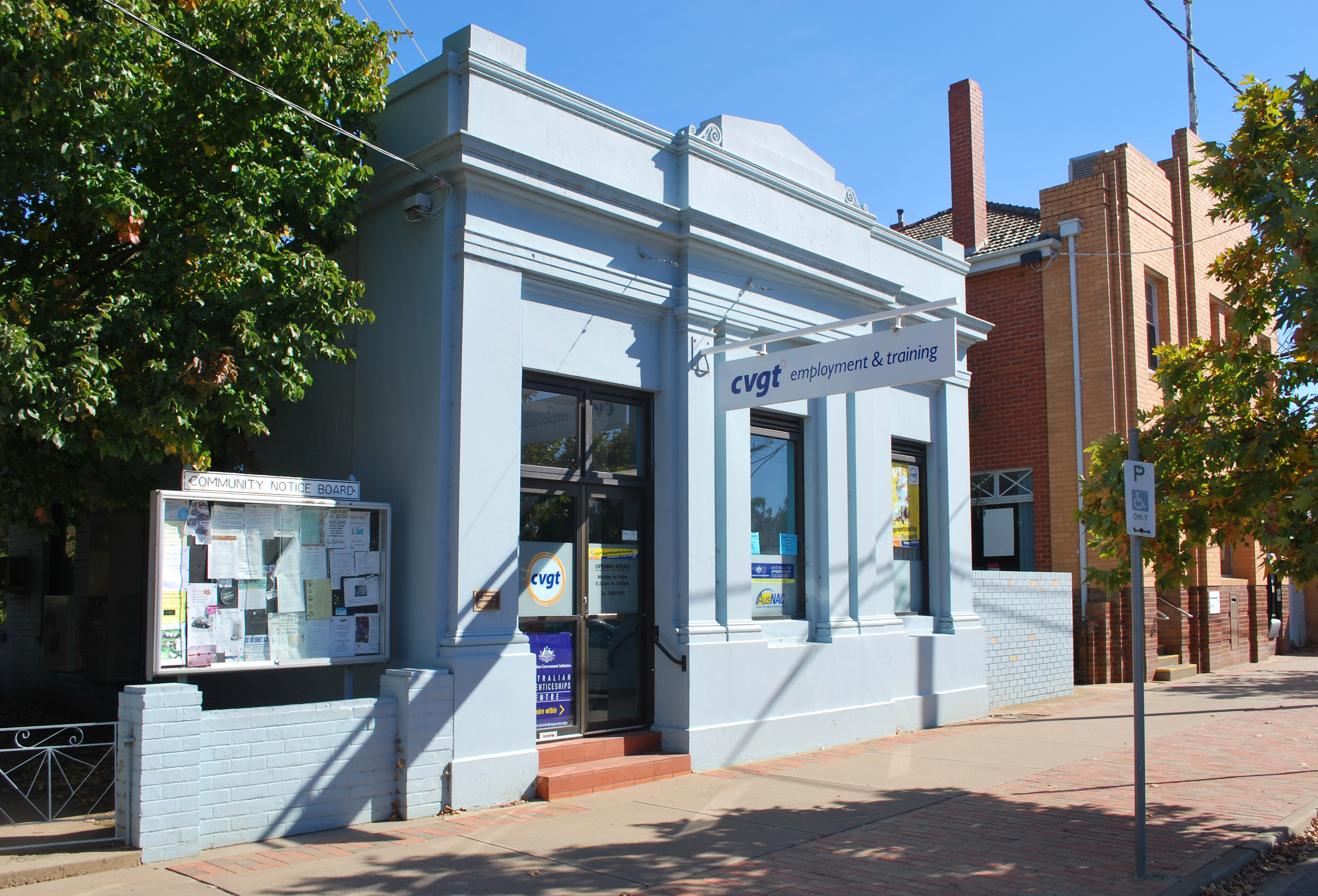
Charlton Bank of Australasia

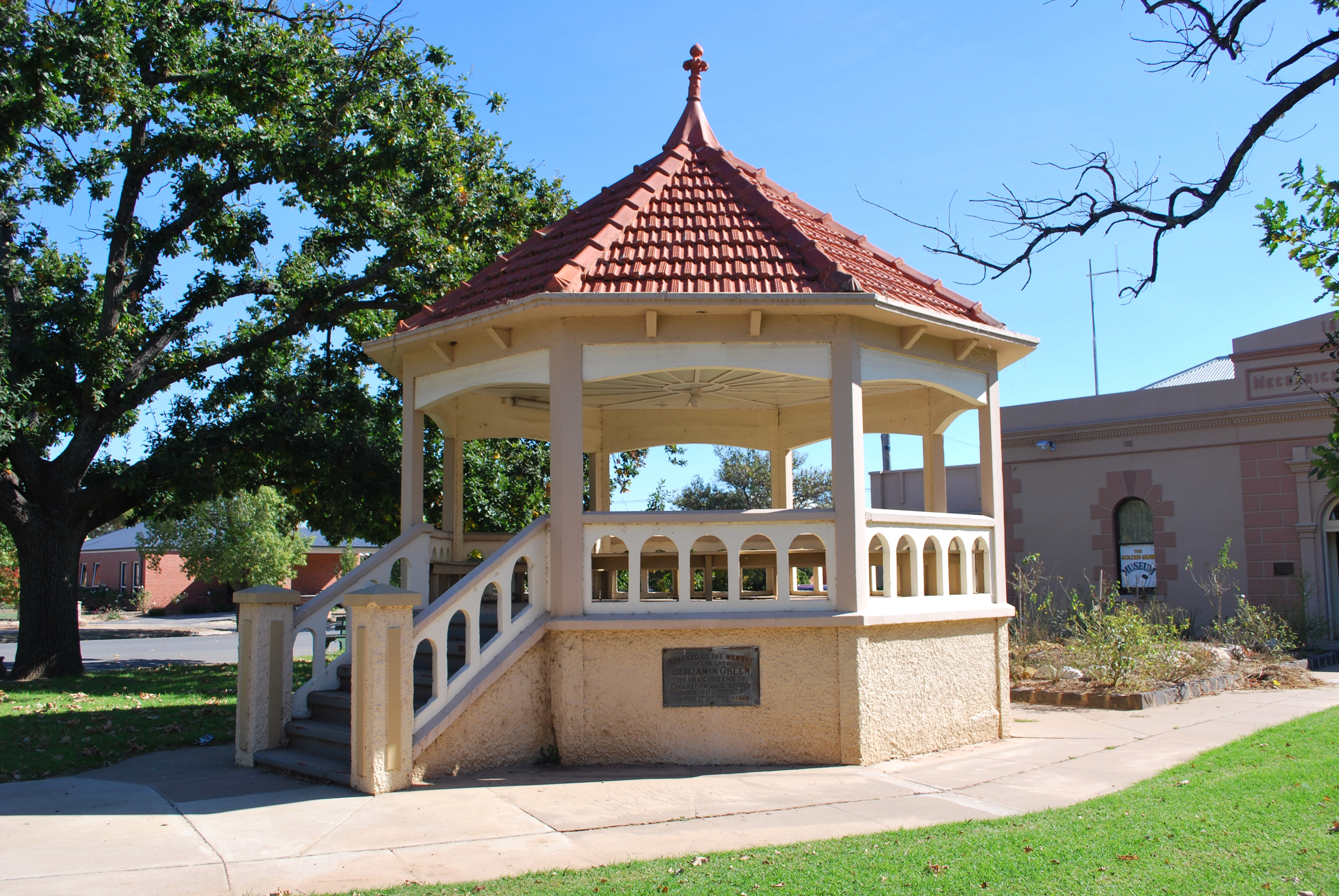
Green Memorial Rotunda

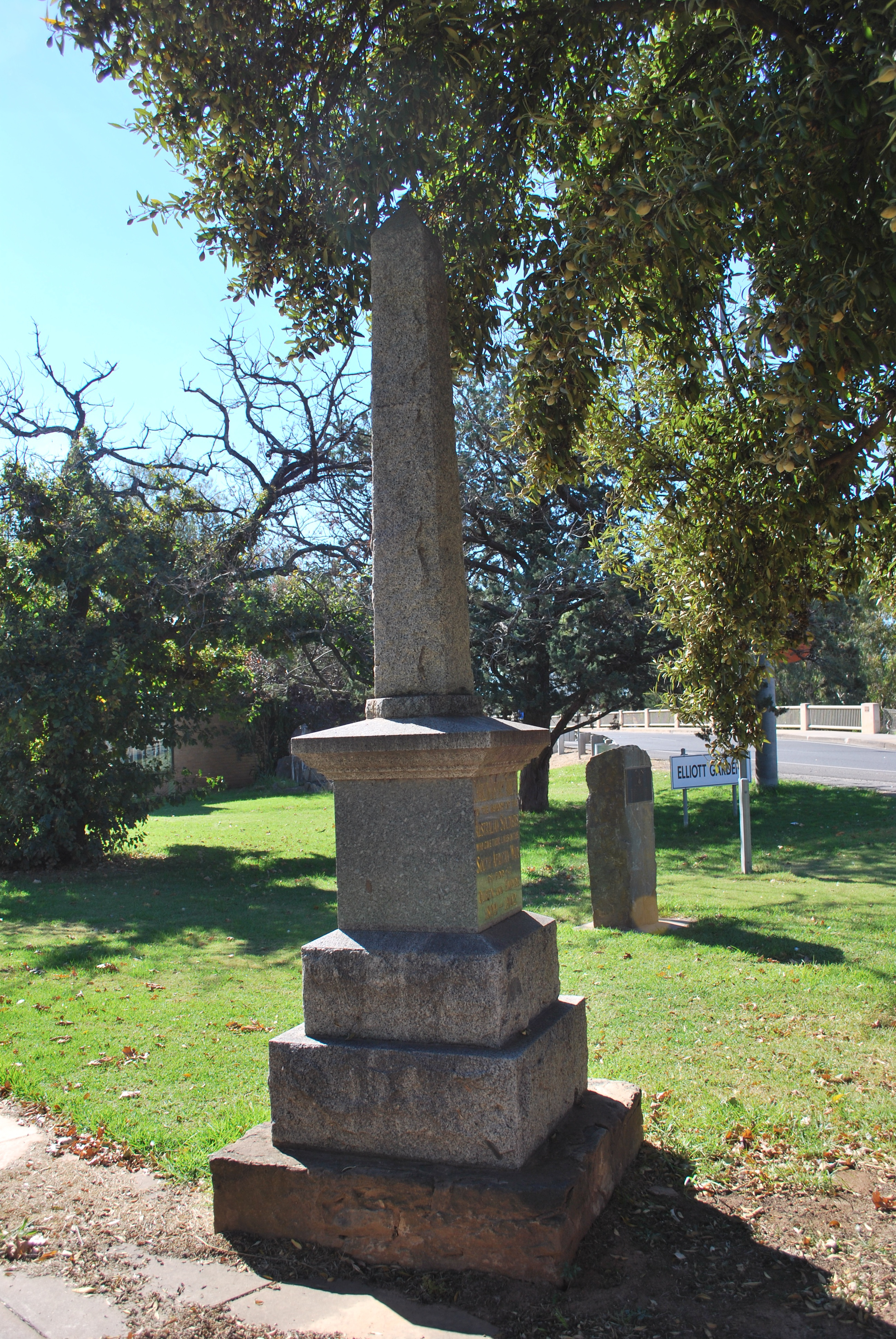
Charlton Boer War Memorial

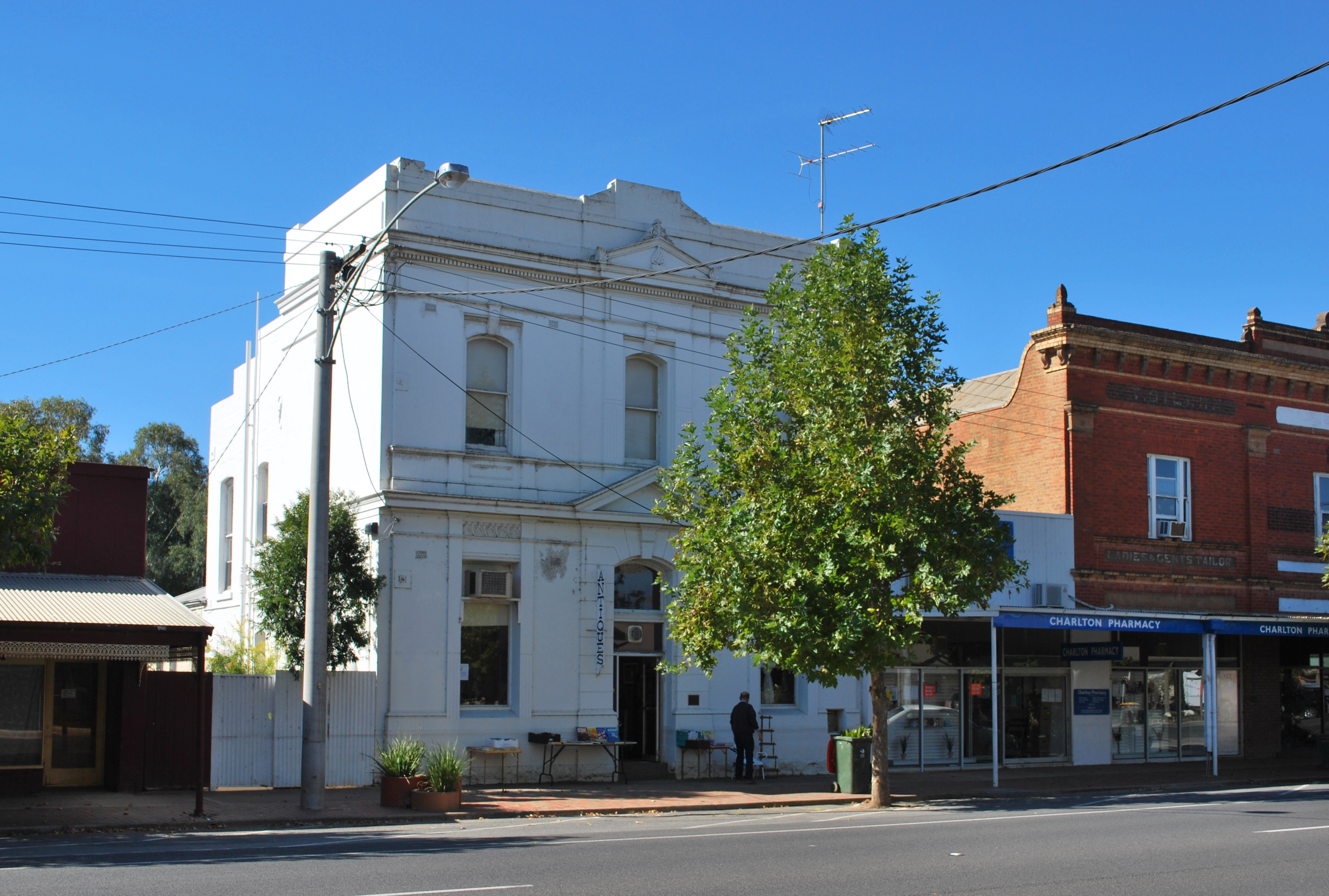
Building
