= Korong Vale =

- Town
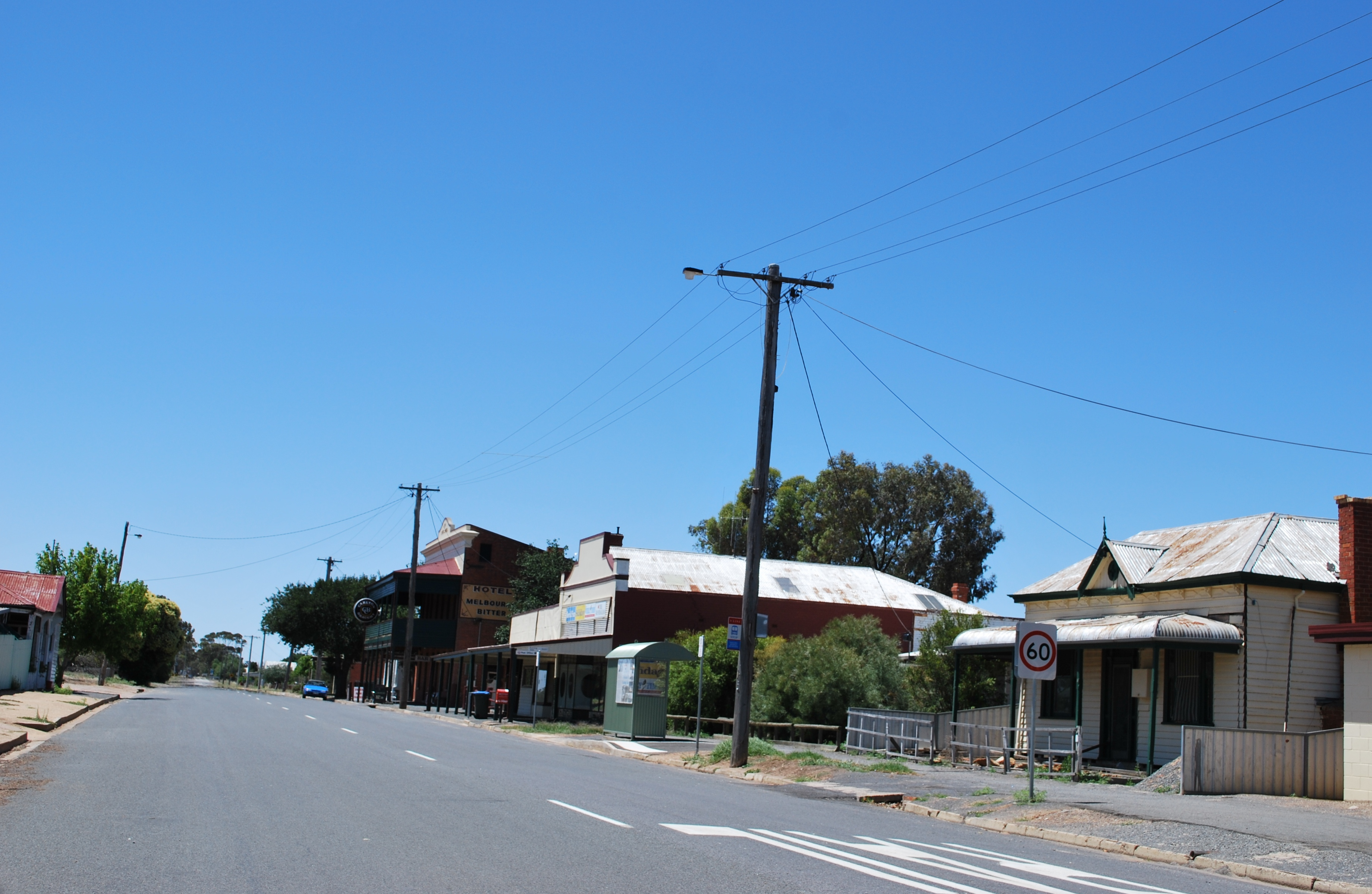
- Main street

- Coordinates: 36°21′0″S 143°42′0″E
- Country: Australia
- State: Victoria
- LGA: Shire of Loddon
- Location: 232 km (144 mi) NW of Melbourne; 85 km (53 mi) NW of Bendigo; 14 km (8.7 mi) NE of Wedderburn

Government
  - State electorate: Ripon
  - Federal division: Mallee

Population
  - Total: 168 (2016 census)
- Postcode: 3520

Korong Vale is a town in north western Victoria. The town is in the Shire of Loddon, 232 kilometres (144 mi) north west of the state capital of Melbourne. At the 2016 census, Korong Vale had a population of 168.

Korongvale Post Office opened on 17 May 1879 and was renamed Korong Vale around 1945.

Korong Vale—as the junction of the Kulwin and Robinvale railway lines—was a major railway town for many years and much of the population was made up of railway staff and their families. The local railway station also had a locomotive depot and railway yard. In 2009 the only rail infrastructure remaining was a single crossing loop and a single point for the junction for the lines to Kulwin and Robinvale.

Post WW2, Korong Vale was a thriving town servicing the railway and farming community. In the town centre, there was Harrisons Hardware Store, a clothing store, a bakery, a butchers, McTaggerts Foundry, Mathews Hotel and a cafe. There was Korong Vale Primary school, bowling green, tennis courts, and Korong Vale football and netball club. The town hall remains.

Golfers play at the course of the Korong Vale Golf Club.
