= Boort =

- Town
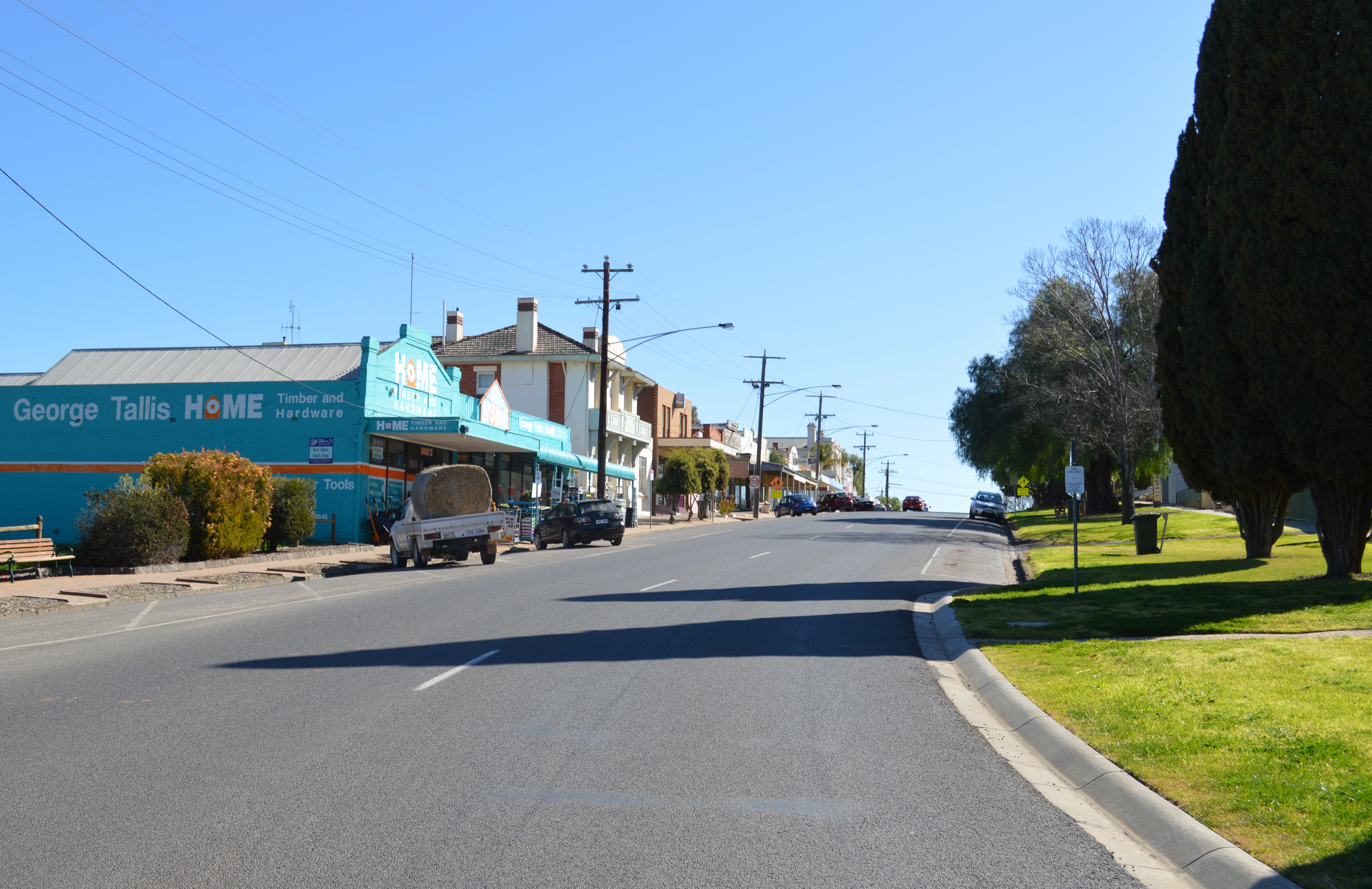
- Godfrey Street, the main street of Boort

- Coordinates: 36°06′S 143°43′E
- Country: Australia
- State: Victoria
- LGA: Shire of Loddon
- Location: 251 km (156 mi) NW of Melbourne; 103 km (64 mi) NW of Bendigo; 106 km (66 mi) S of Swan Hill

Government
  - State electorate: Murray Plains
  - Federal division: Mallee
- Elevation: 90 m (300 ft)

Population
  - Total: 940 (2021 census)
- Postcode: 3537
- Mean max temp: 22.6 °C (72.7 °F)
- Mean min temp: 9.2 °C (48.6 °F)
- Annual rainfall: 395.8 mm (15.58 in)

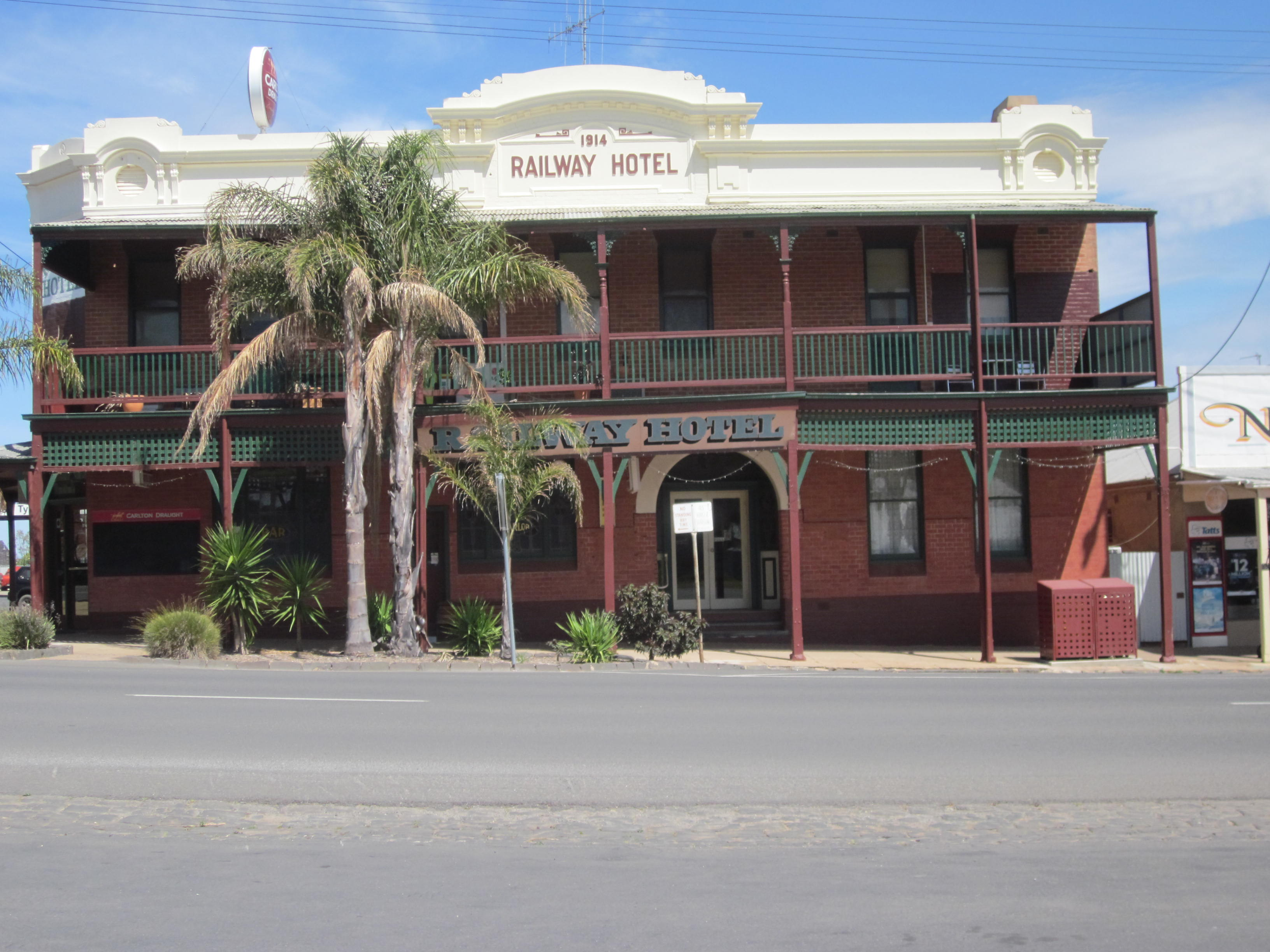
Railway Hotel, Boort in 2018

Boort (/ˈbɔːrt/) is a town in Victoria, Australia, located next to Lake Boort, in the Shire of Loddon. The town is known for its native birdlife.

Main sources of employment are agriculture, health, education, and olive processing. Agriculture is a major industry and employer in the Boort region. Produce includes cereal crops, tomatoes, canola, olives, hay and wool.

== History ==
The traditional owners of Boort are the Djadjawurrung. Boort is a Djadjawurrung word meaning "Smoke from the hill". The area is home to many scar trees which are of cultural significance. It is estimated that there are over five-hundred scar trees in the area.

The township of Boort takes its name from the Boort pastoral run, established in 1846 by John Bear. Initially located southeast of Lake Boort, the Boort homestead marked the area's early European settlement, while the township itself emerged northwest of the lake. In the late 1840s, Frederick Godfrey acquired the pastoral run and diverted water from the Loddon River into Keningapanule Creek, which eventually formed the swampy depression known today as Lake Boort. By the 1870s, farm selections were steadily established in the Boort district, and water infrastructure followed with the creation of the Loddon Waterworks Trust in 1882, later succeeded by a local irrigation trust in 1888. Boort railway station opened in 1883, linking it to Wedderburn Junction and eventually Quambatook.

In 1905, the State Rivers and Water Supply Commission absorbed Boort's irrigation trust and extended the Waranga Eastern Channel to the district in the 1920s, spurring population growth through improved water access and a shift toward urban living. Key developments included a new hospital in 1923, its upgrade to a District Hospital in 1961 and a high school in 1963. Agricultural land west of Boort faced salinity issues from rising water tables, but laser profiling of paddocks has improved drainage and reduced water retention, helping sustain the region’s productivity.

== Population ==
At the 2016 census, Boort had a population of 873. 83.8% of people were born in Australia and 87.9% of people spoke only English at home. The most common responses for religion were No Religion 26.9%, Uniting Church 15.0% and Catholic 12.5%.

== Sporting activities ==
Boort is known as The Northern Oasis. Lake Boort is central to the town and is used for water sports including skiing, sailing, duck hunting, fishing and swimming.

Boort has an Australian rules football team, Boort Football, Hockey, Netball Club competes in the North Central Football League. Notable players from Boort are VFL Brownlow Medallist John Schultz. The team previously recruited ex-AFL player Lance Picioane. The club colours are black and white.

Golfers play at the Boort Golf Club on Charlton Road.

== Infrastructure ==
The Post Office opened on 14 August 1874, and the railway arrived in 1883.

Boort has a hospital, pharmacy, P-12 school, butcher shop, newsagent, hairdresser, supermarket, hardware store, tyre service, mechanic, veterinary service and community centre.

== Notable residents ==
- Prof. Ruth Fincher AM, prominent Australian geographer and university leader, born in Boort 1951.

== Metal Sculpture Competition ==
Boort was the home of John Piccoli (died 22 April 2021), dubbed "The Spanner Man", a farmer who in his spare time created sculptures entirely from discarded spanners. Inspired by his work, Boort hosts an annual competition for artists in metal sculpture, resulting in a trail of works around Little Lake Boort.

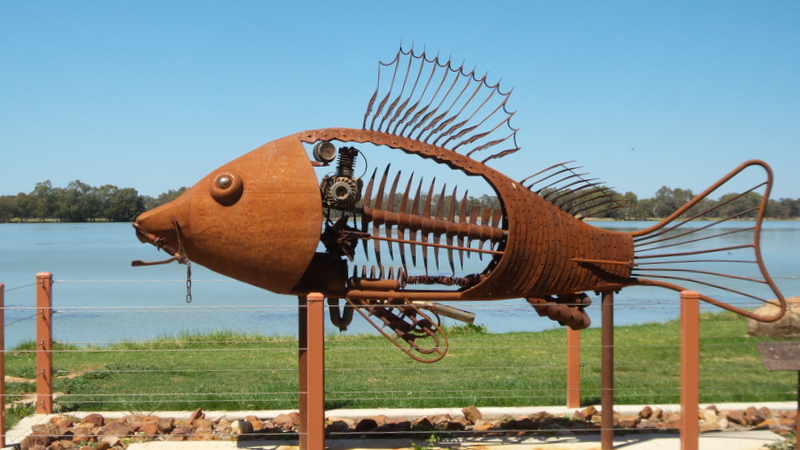
Rusty the Redfin

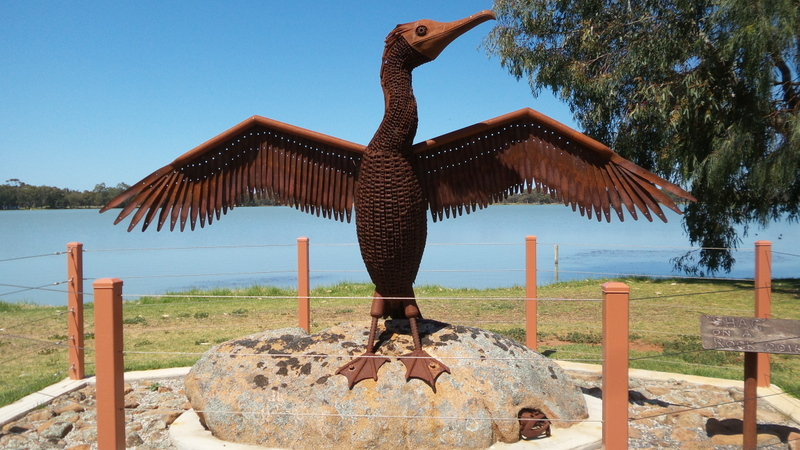
Shag on a Rock

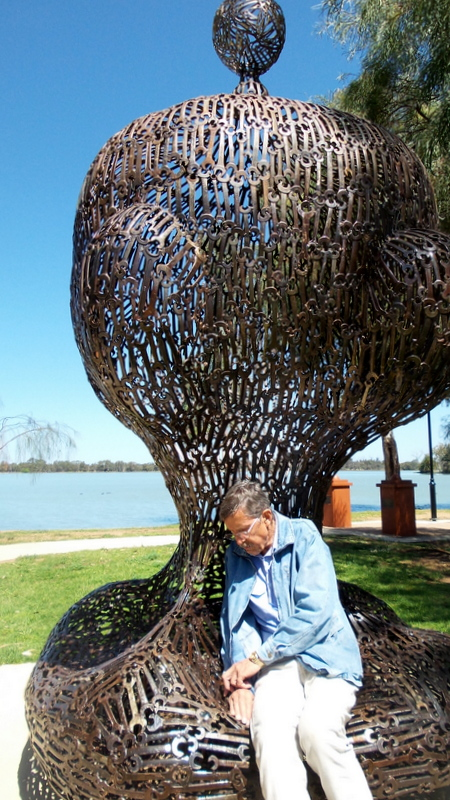
Spanner seat

== Climate ==
Climate data for Boort, elevation 103 m (338 ft)
Month	Jan	Feb	Mar	Apr	May	Jun	Jul	Aug	Sep	Oct	Nov	Dec	Year
Record high °C (°F)	45.0 (113.0)	43.0 (109.4)	39.5 (103.1)	33.2 (91.8)	28.6 (83.5)	21.2 (70.2)	24.2 (75.6)	27.2 (81.0)	33.1 (91.6)	36.5 (97.7)	41.6 (106.9)	42.0 (107.6)	45.0 (113.0)
Mean daily maximum °C (°F)	31.3 (88.3)	31.0 (87.8)	27.6 (81.7)	22.4 (72.3)	17.9 (64.2)	14.4 (57.9)	13.9 (57.0)	15.7 (60.3)	18.6 (65.5)	22.3 (72.1)	26.3 (79.3)	29.5 (85.1)	22.6 (72.7)
Mean daily minimum °C (°F)	14.8 (58.6)	15.3 (59.5)	13.0 (55.4)	9.5 (49.1)	6.8 (44.2)	4.4 (39.9)	3.7 (38.7)	4.6 (40.3)	6.2 (43.2)	8.3 (46.9)	10.8 (51.4)	13.2 (55.8)	9.2 (48.6)
Record low °C (°F)	6.0 (42.8)	7.0 (44.6)	4.2 (39.6)	0.9 (33.6)	−0.5 (31.1)	−3.5 (25.7)	−3.1 (26.4)	−1.0 (30.2)	−0.6 (30.9)	−1.0 (30.2)	2.7 (36.9)	5.5 (41.9)	−3.5 (25.7)
Average rainfall mm (inches)	25.4 (1.00)	26.0 (1.02)	25.8 (1.02)	28.0 (1.10)	37.9 (1.49)	38.6 (1.52)	37.9 (1.49)	41.2 (1.62)	38.1 (1.50)	39.6 (1.56)	33.5 (1.32)	27.3 (1.07)	399.8 (15.74)
Average rainy days (≥ 1.0 mm)	2.5	2.3	2.7	3.4	5.1	6.1	6.7	7.0	5.5	5.2	3.6	3.0	53.1
Source: Australian Bureau of Meteorology

== See also ==
- Boort railway station
- Boort Secondary College
- Richmond L'Ami
- Robinvale railway line
