= Wedderburn, Victoria =

Wedderburn
- Town
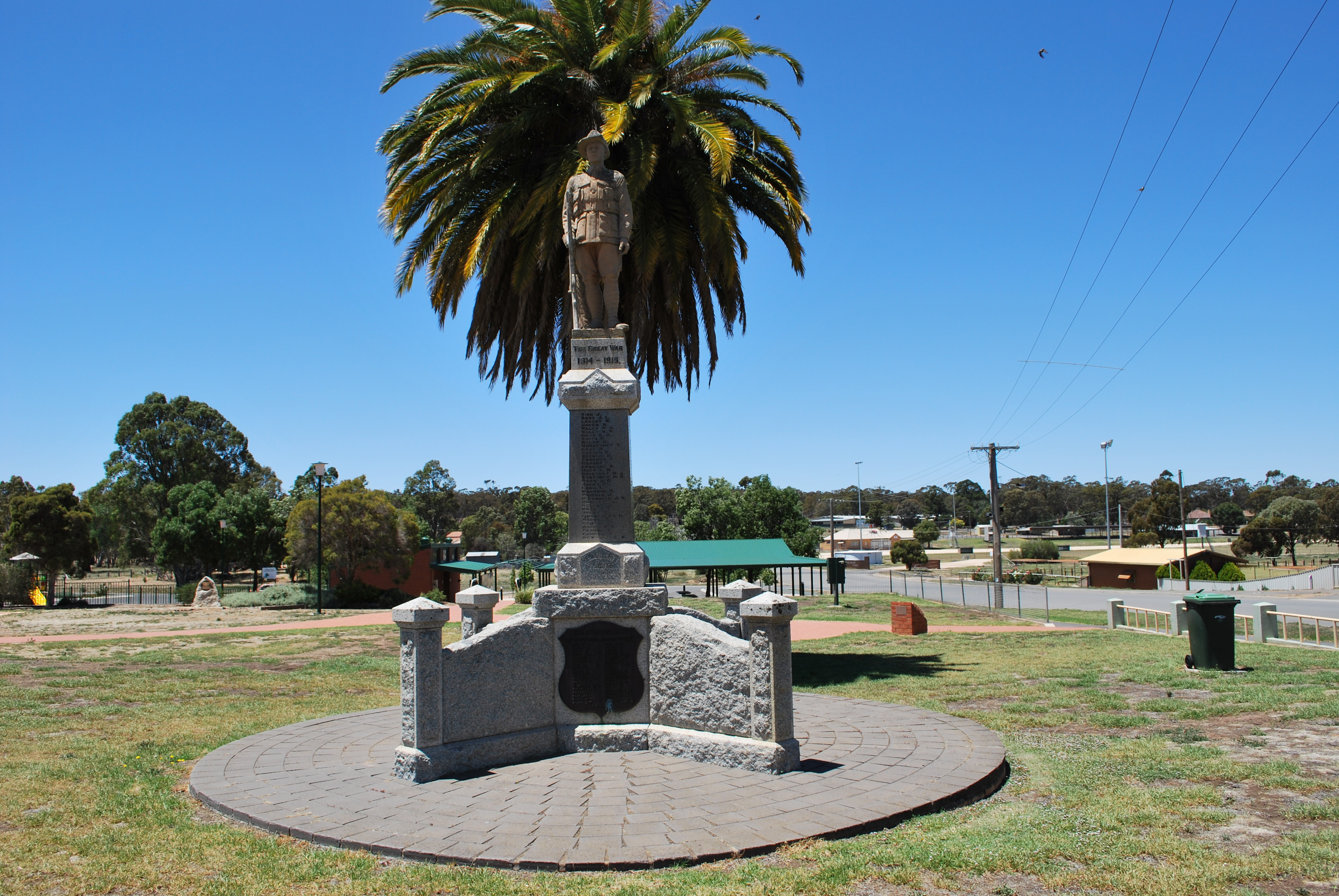
- War memorial at Albert Jacka Park

- Coordinates: 36°25′S 143°37′E
- Country: Australia
- State: Victoria
- LGA: Shire of Loddon
- Location: 217 km (135 mi) NW of Melbourne; 75 km (47 mi) NW of Bendigo; 31 km (19 mi) SE of Charlton

Government
  - State electorate: Ripon
  - Federal division: Mallee
- Elevation: 189 m (620 ft)

Population
  - Total: 951 (2021 census)
- Postcode: 3518

Wedderburn is a town in Victoria, Australia on the Calder Highway, 217 kilometres (135 mi) north of Victoria's capital city, Melbourne. At the 2021 census, Wedderburn had a population of 951. It is mainly a farming community but its early residents were gold miners and prospectors.

== History ==
The post office opened on 1 August 1856, after the first gold rush to the area commenced in 1852, but it was known as Korong until 1858. The railway arrived in 1883, linking Wedderburn with Charlton and Bendigo via Inglewood. In the Bendigo Advertiser of 14 May 1884 it was written: "That well-known locality, Korong Vale, has been re-christened. It has been so determined in consequence of the confusion of names, there being a Korong (now Wedderburn), a Kerang, a Mount Korong, and the Korong Vale. The latter has now received the dignified lordly title of Rosebery or Rosebury, I know not which, but I am disposed to think that its new title will be more in the name than in the reality, and that the word "Vale" will still be generally used."

The Hand of Faith gold nugget, weighing over 27 kilograms was found at Kingower near Wedderburn in 1980. It was sold to the Gold Nugget Casino in Las Vegas for over a million dollars and is currently on display there. This discovery created another gold rush to the Wedderburn area, this time with metal detectors, not picks and shovels.

Old Works, north of Royal George Mine, Emu

== Present day ==
One of the main attractions for tourists is Hard Hill Reserve where, with a bit of imagination, one can feel a sense of what it was like in the 'old days' living in tents on the goldfields. Apart from gold, a number of Eucalyptus stills used to operate in the district and a replica still has been situated on the site and is fired up, by arrangement, for tourist buses. On site is one of the original batteries for crushing the ore and removing the gold. A puddler is also on site and a demonstration of it working can be seen during the annual Detector Jamboree Festival held on the Labor Day long weekend each year.

Wedderburn is a popular location for prospecting, with a 2.7kg gold nugget discovered in 2015.

Wedderburn has an older than average demographic. At the 2016 Census it had a population of 940. The town today is predominantly farming based, though the town includes the head office for the local Shire Council (Loddon), a P-12 school servicing the needs of a number of surrounding towns and communities, a vibrant Community Centre housing a Tourist Information Centre and numerous community services, a Medical Centre and some manufacturing and service businesses. The Donaldson Park Recreation Reserve in the centre of town is a feature of Wedderburn. It includes a football oval, netball courts, hockey field, trotting track, lawn bowling greens, tennis courts and a swimming pool.

Soldiers Memorial Park is located in the centre of Wedderburn. As part of its Commemoration of the Centenary of Anzac program, Loddon Shire Council has commissioned a magnificent bronze sculpture of two of the district's most famous sons, World War One Victoria Cross recipients Albert Borella and Albert Jacka.

In 2015, Wedderburn won the right to host The Race that Slows Down the Nation, a horse-suit race held by radio personalities Hamish & Andy. The race was held as a means to safely slow down the nation for the Melbourne Cup (which is often dubbed "the race that stops the nation"). The winner of the race, "Hoof Hearted", won $2000 in prize money as well as a hamper that featured food and gifts from the Wedderburn region.

Wedderburn has a Visitor Radio Station which can be found at FM 87.6. At the top of the hour, it broadcasts an events bulletin which gives details of community events for the next month.

An increasing number of people are taking up lifestyle opportunities at Wedderburn and living on small rural allotments around the town. This effectively means that the town is larger than appears in census data.

== Sport & Recreation ==
Wedderburn has a football team, the Redbacks, competing in the North Central Football League. The team created a League record when from 2011 to 2014 they won four straight senior premierships. They also have reserves, under 16 and under 14 football teams, a successful Netball Club and a Hockey Club which also compete in the North Central League. In 2018 the football, netball and hockey clubs combined to form the Wedderburn Redbacks Inc.

Premierships - Senior Football

- North Western Football Association
  - 1902, 1907
- Korong District Central Football Association
  - 1911, 1914, 1919, 1921
- Korong Football League
- 1932, 1934, 1935, 1937, 1938, 1939, 1945, 1946, 1948
- North Central Football League
  - 1951, 1968, 1970, 2007, 2011, 2012, 2013, 2014

Golfers play at the course of the Wedderburn Golf Club on Racecourse Road.

== Notable people ==
- Albert Jacka, awarded the Victoria Cross in World War I, lived in Wedderburn from the age of four until he enlisted in 1914. He was the first Australian to be awarded the Victoria Cross in that war. He later became Mayor of St Kilda.
- Albert Borella, another World War I Victoria Cross recipient, was born and raised at Borung, near Wedderburn.
- William Jacka, brother of Albert and also raised in Wedderburn, was another notable World War I soldier. He went on to become Mayor of Footscray.
- Australian rules football champion Cresswell "Mickey" Crisp was born and raised in Wedderburn. Crisp played for Wedderburn from 1923 to 1928, prior to playing with Sandhurst. He later played 183 games with Carlton in the Victorian Football League, winning two club best and fairest awards, played in its 1938 premiership team and captained Victoria.
- Keith Turnbull, a minister in the Bolte government in Victoria, attended Wedderburn State School and later became a farmer at Wedderburn.
