= Robinvale railway line =

Railway line in Victoria, Australia

Robinvale

Overview
- Status: Open for freight to Manangatang, closed beyond Manangatang.
- Connecting lines: Eaglehawk-Inglewood railway line, Kulwin railway line, Mildura line
- Former connections: Wedderburn Line
- Stations: 12 (some demolished)

Service
- Type: VicRail passenger service (former) and freight line
- System: Pacific National
- Services: Grain to Boort, Quambatook and Manangatang, containers from Ultima
- Rolling stock: various

History
- Opened: 1924
- Completed: 1926
- Closed: 18 January 2008 (Manangatang to Robinvale)

Technical
- Line length: 301.346 km (187.2 mi)
- Num of tracks: Single track
- Signalling: Train Order Working
Route map

The Robinvale railway line is a freight only country railway line in north-western Victoria, Australia. The line branches from the Mildura line at Dunolly, and at Inglewood the Eaglehawk – Inglewood line connects with the Piangil line outside Bendigo. The parallel Kulwin line junctions from the Robinvale line at Korong Vale then continues northward.

== History ==
The line was opened from Inglewood to Korong Vale in 1882, and first extended towards Charlton as part of what is now the Kulwin line. The line from Korong Vale to Boort opened in 1883, and to Quambatook in 1894. It was extended to Ultima in 1900, to Chillingollah in 1909, to Manangatang in 1914, to Annuello in 1921, and Robinvale in 1924. In 1930, it was extended to Koorakee, New South Wales, as part of the proposed Lette railway line, although that section was never officially opened for traffic. The extension into New South Wales involved the construction of a lift-span bridge over the Murray River. The section in New South Wales closed in 1943.

Access to Melbourne was originally from the Bendigo line via Bridgewater, until the opening of the Dunolly to Inglewood route to the Mildura line in 1888.

The last regular passenger service on the line, operated by a DERM, ran from Bendigo to Robinvale on 3 June 1978. From 5 June 1978, the service was replaced by Bendigo – Ultima and Swan Hill – Robinvale buses.

=== Lette railway line ===
Lette railway line

Overview
- Status: Closed
- Locale: Victoria and New South Wales, Australia

History
- Opened: never officially opened
- Closed: 12 February 1943 (construction officially ceased)

Technical
- Track gauge: 1,600 mm (5 ft 3 in)

The Lette railway line was a proposed extension running from Robinvale in Victoria to Lette in New South Wales, Australia. The line from Annuello to Robinvale in Victoria was opened on 5 June 1924, and a 60-kilometre (37 mi) extension to Lette was planned, being provided for under the Border Railways Act 1922. The extension, part of a scheme to foster closer settlement of the Riverina district of New South Wales, was to serve the locations of Euston, Benanee, Koorakee, Werimble, Mylatchie and Lette.

==== Construction ====
Work started on the railway in 1926, and the rail-road bridge across the Murray River at Robinvale, built as part of the project, was opened on 14 March 1928. Construction was halted for a time, but recommenced in April 1929, and in April 1930, a special train ran as far as Koorakee. Construction work continued towards Lette, but was never completed, and the section to Koorakee was never officially opened for traffic.

==== Closure ====
Trains on the line were operated by the Railways Construction Branch until construction was officially abandoned on 12 February 1943. The rail-road bridge was replaced in 2006 by a new road bridge. The lifting span of the former bridge has been placed in a nearby park, as a permanent historical display. The remains of the only other bridge on the line still exist today. The line to Robinvale is still open for freight trains, even though the section between Manangatang to Robinvale was closed in 2008.

== Operation ==
Today the line operates using the Train Order Working system of safeworking, with just a single crossing loop at Korong Vale. Speed limits are set between 65 and 40 km/h (40 and 25 mph) to Manangatang, with all Victorian mainline locomotives permitted to run.

In 2008 the line was booked out for upgrades to the track and level crossings from Ultima to Robinvale. In April 2008, it was announced that the Korong Vale – Quambatook section of the line would be upgraded as part of the Victorian core grain network, in a $23.7 million package with six other lines. The Dunolly – Korong Vale section had already been upgraded.

In 2008, the line was cut back to Manangatang, and containers formerly loaded at Boort are now loaded at Donald (Mildura line). The Eaglehawk (Bendigo) - Inglewood link has had traffic suspended, and has been disconnected at the northern end. All trains run via Dunolly on the Mildura line. The line speed was cut to 25 km/h from Korong Vale to Lalbert, due to poor sleeper condition, then 40 km/h beyond. While the Mildura line was being converted to standard gauge, the containers normally loaded at Merbein were loaded at Manangatang.

The line was scheduled to be converted to standard gauge after the conversion of the Mildura and Murrayville lines had been completed. That work was cancelled in 2019, due to the Murray Basin Rail Project, under which the conversion was to be done, running out of money.

Current operations are grain services as required, which are operated by Pacific National and Southern Shorthaul Railroad, as well as a container train service from Ultima to Victoria Dock, which is operated by QUBE Logistics.

== See also ==
- Rail transport in Victoria
- Rail transport in New South Wales
