= Kulwin railway line =

Railway line in Victoria, Australia

Kulwin
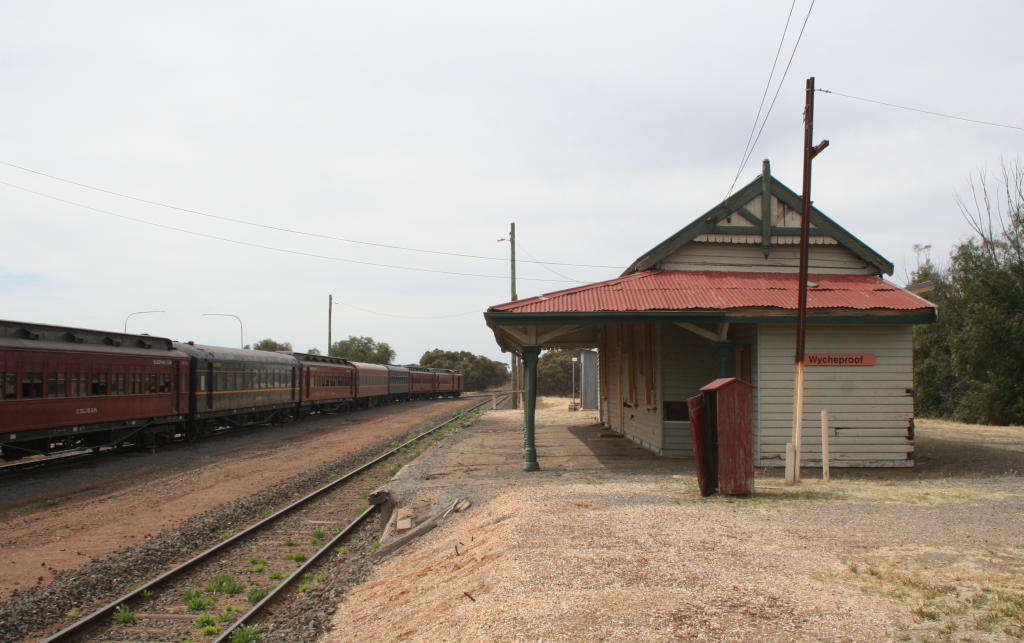
- Wycheproof station with a Steamrail Victoria train in the background

Overview
- Status: Operational as a freight only line to Sea Lake, closed beyond Sea Lake
- Connecting lines: Robinvale railway line
- Stations: 5

Service
- Type: Branch
- System: Pacific National, Southern Shorthaul Railroad, Qube Logistics (formerly)
- Services: Grain to Charlton, Wycheproof, Nullawil, Berriwillock, Sea Lake

History
- Opened: 1883
- Completed: 1920
- Closed: 2010 (Sea Lake to Kulwin)

Technical
- Line length: 199.8 km (124.1 mi)
- Num of tracks: Single track
- Track gauge: Broad
- Signalling: Train Order Working
Route map

The Kulwin railway line is located in north-western Victoria, Australia. It junctions from the Robinvale line at Korong Vale and only sees usage by freight trains.

== History ==
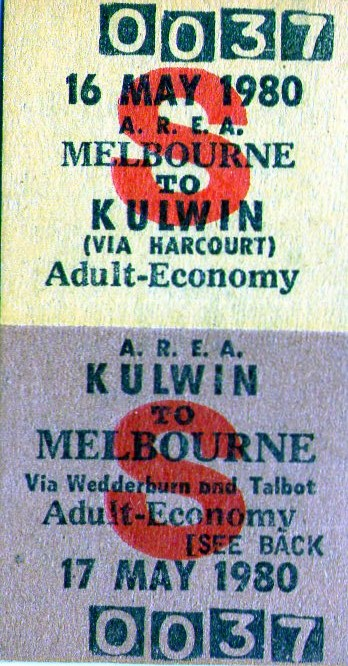
Melbourne-Kulwin rail ticket 1980

The line was opened from Korong Vale to Wycheproof in 1883, and extended to Sea Lake in 1893, to Nandaly in 1914, Mittyack in 1919, and Kulwin in 1920. Access to the line was originally from the Bendigo line via Bridgewater, until the opening of the Dunolly to Inglewood route to the Mildura line in 1888.

The last regular passenger service on the line ran from Bendigo to Sea Lake on 7 May 1977 and was operated by a DERM. In April 2008 it was announced that the Korong Vale – Charlton section of the line would be upgraded as part of the Victorian core grain network, in a $23.7 million package with 6 other lines.

In February 2010, baulks were placed across the line just north of Sea Lake due to the deteriorating condition of the track. As majority of grain trains only go as far as Sea Lake, this made practical sense. Furthermore, the segment between Sea Lake and Kulwin was closed due to sand drifts and sand slides in 2006 and 2008 respectively.

Current operations are as-required grain trains operated by Pacific National and Southern Shorthaul Railroad.
