= Towaninny =

- Town
- Coordinates: 35°49′18″S 143°21′57″E
- Country: Australia
- State: Victoria
- LGAs: Shire of Buloke; Shire of Gannawarra
- Location: 311 km (193 mi) NW of Melbourne; 35 km (22 mi) from Wycheproof; 60 km (37 mi) from Swan Hill

Government
  - State electorate: Mildura
  - Federal division: Mallee

Population
  - Total: 4 (SAL 2021)
- Postcode: 3527
Localities around Towaninny
| Cokum | Tittybong | Quambatook |
| Kalpienung | Towaninny | Quambatook |
| Kalpienung | Towaninny South | Ninyeunook |

Towaninny is a locality in the Victoria, Australia, located approximately 35 km from Wycheproof, Victoria.

Towaninnie [sic] Post Office opened on 1 October 1864 and closed in 1953. The pastoral run here was known as Towaninnie, but when the area was surveyed and gazetted as a parish in 1871 the spelling was Towaninny.

== See also ==
- List of places in Victoria (Australia) named from pastoral runs
