= Towaninny South =

- Town
- Coordinates: 35°56′00″S 143°21′06″E
- Country: Australia
- State: Victoria
- LGA: Shire of Buloke
- Location: 253 km (157 mi) NW of Melbourne; 19 km (12 mi) NE of Wycheproof; 68 km (42 mi) SW of Swan Hill

Government
  - State electorate: Mildura
  - Federal division: Mallee

Population
  - Total: 0 (SAL 2016)
- Postcode: 3527
Localities around Towaninny South
Kalpienung	Towaninny	Towaninny
Dumosa	Towaninny South	Ninyeunook
Wycheproof	Bunguluke	Jeruk

Towaninny South is a locality in the local government area of the Shire of Buloke Victoria, Australia. The pastoral run in Towaninny South was known as Towaninnie, but when the area was surveyed and gazetted as a parish in 1871 the spelling was Towaninny.

== See also ==
- List of places in Victoria (Australia) named from pastoral runs
