= Culgoa =

Culgoa Victoria
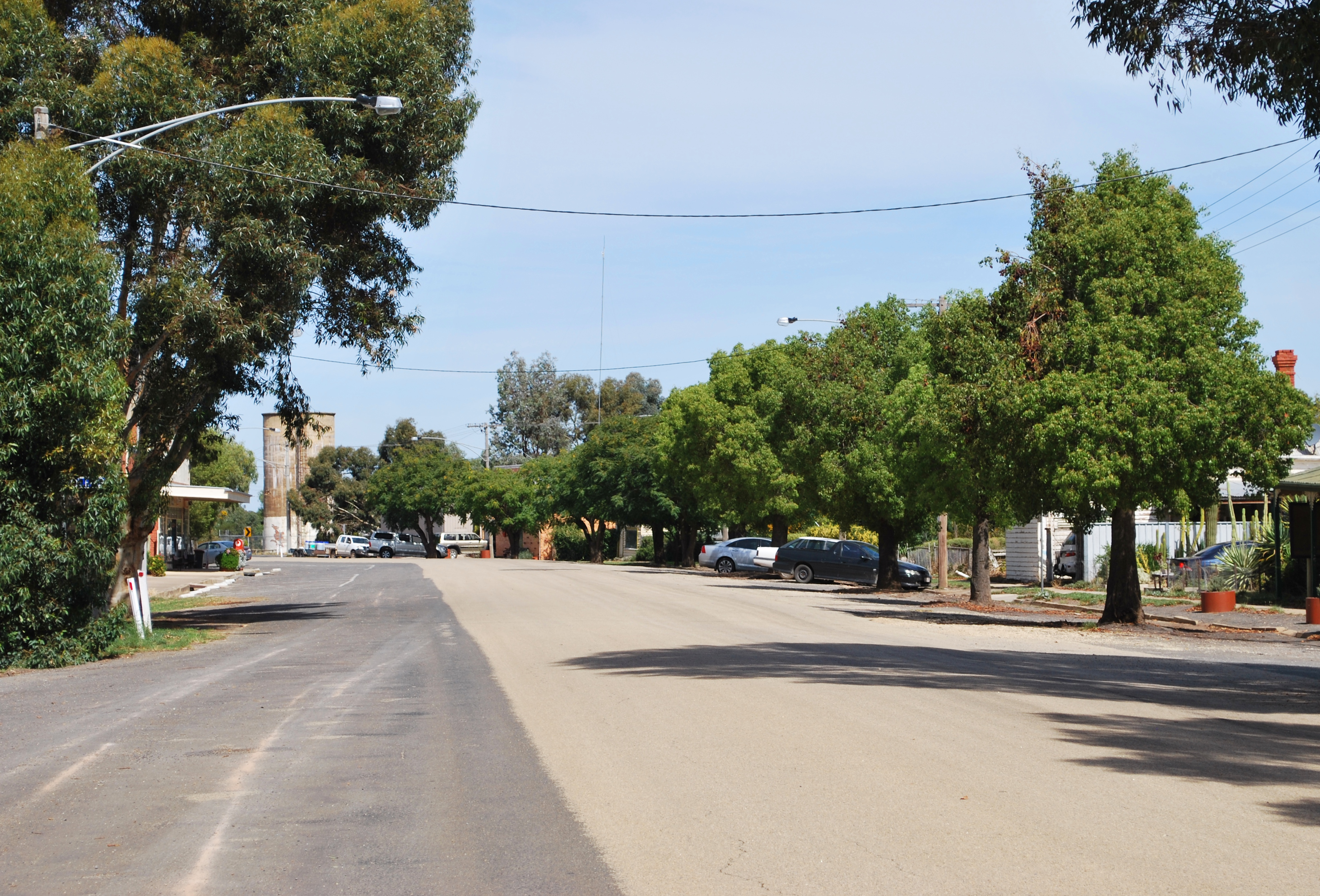
- Main Street, Culgoa

- Coordinates: 35°43′0″S 143°05′0″E
- Population: 86 (2021 census)
- Postcode(s): 3530
- Location: 319 km (198 mi) NW of Melbourne; 179 km (111 mi) NW of Bendigo; 122 km (76 mi) SE of Ouyen; 43 km (27 mi) N of Wycheproof
- LGA(s): Shire of Buloke
Localities around Culgoa:
Berriwillock	Springfield	Murnungin
Sutton	Culgoa	Wangie
Jil Jil	Warne	Cokum

Culgoa is a town in the Mallee region in the north west of the Australian state of Victoria. The town is about 319 kilometres (198 mi) from the state capital, Melbourne. At the 2021 census, Culgoa had a population of 86, declining from 101 in 2016.

Primary production in the area is predominantly wheat and barley, with some legume and oil crops. Sheep numbers have been down since the drought took hold in the early 2000s.

The Post Office opened on 27 May 1893 as Kaneira shortly after the arrival of the railway and was renamed Culgoa in 1920. In 2006 the post office was relocated to the Culgoa Community Store which is a community owned not for profit business to meet the daily needs of the locals.

In 2003 when it looked like the local store would close the community formed a co-operative and purchased the store to run for themselves. The store provides newspapers, bread, milk, groceries and some takeaway. Computer access is also available to the community.

Golfers may play at the Culgoa Golf Club on the Calder Highway. Other sporting venues include tennis, lawn bowls, netball and football.

In 2008, the local primary school closed after 98 years of service to the children of the area.

== Gallery ==
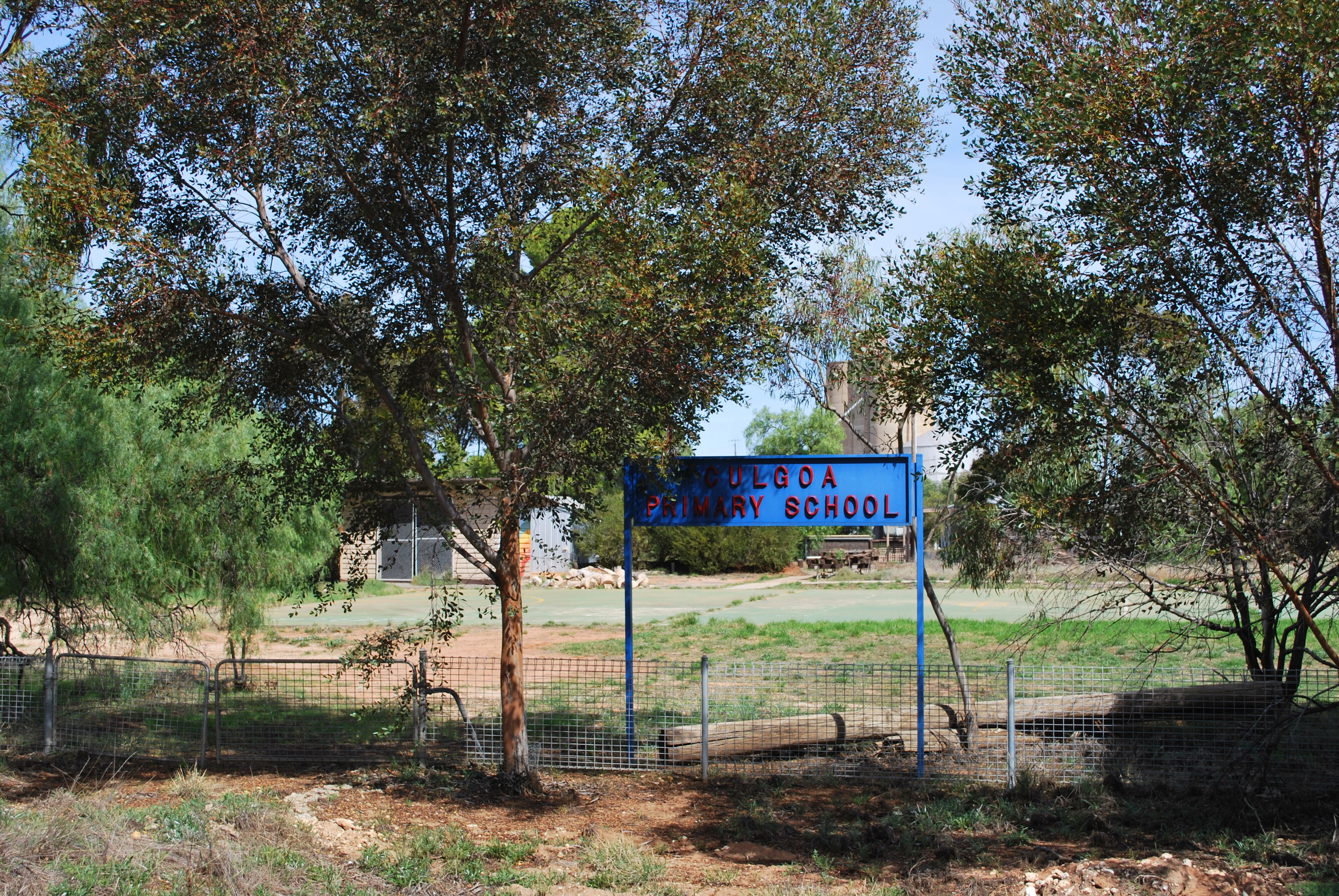
Former primary school

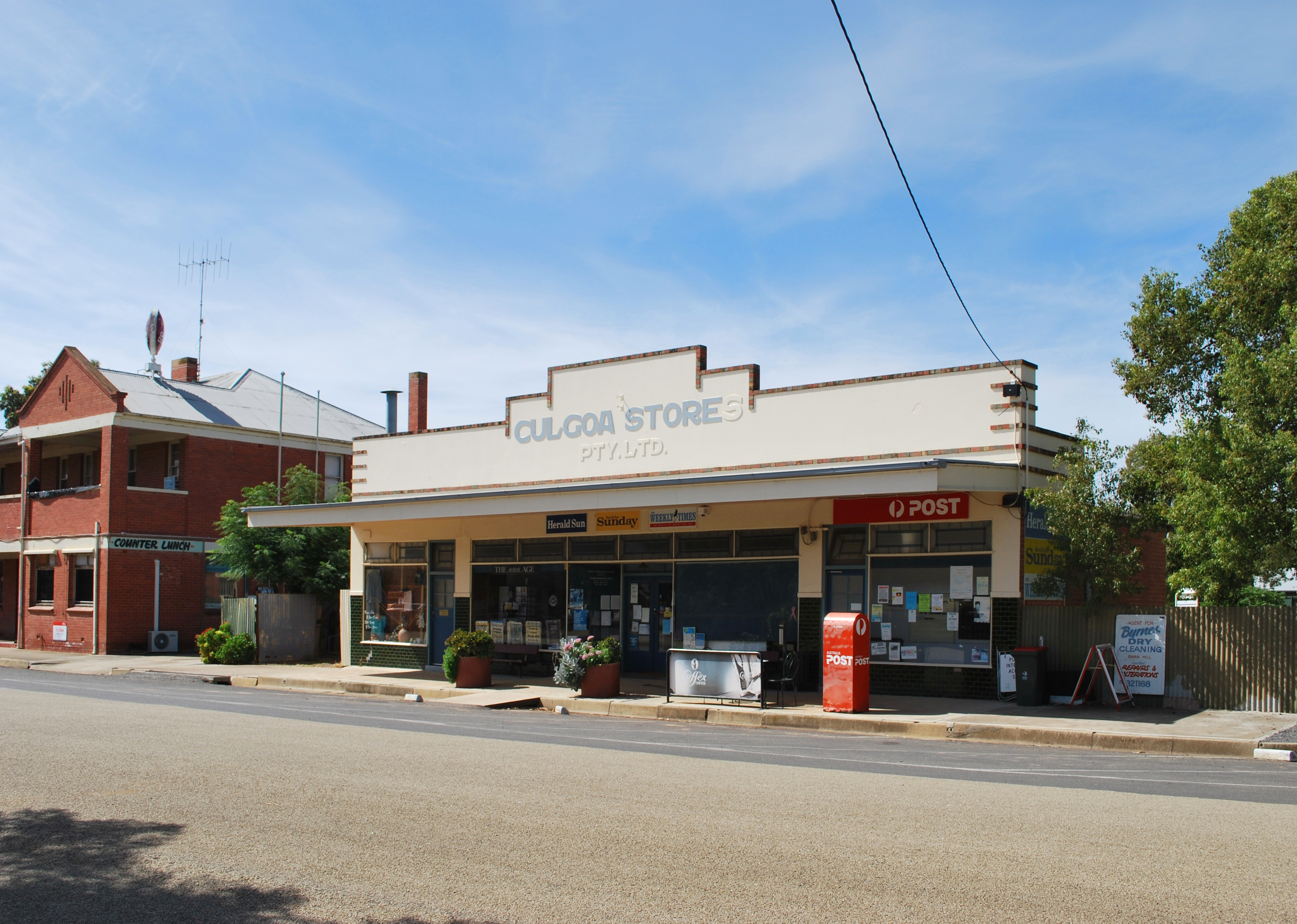
Culgoa community store

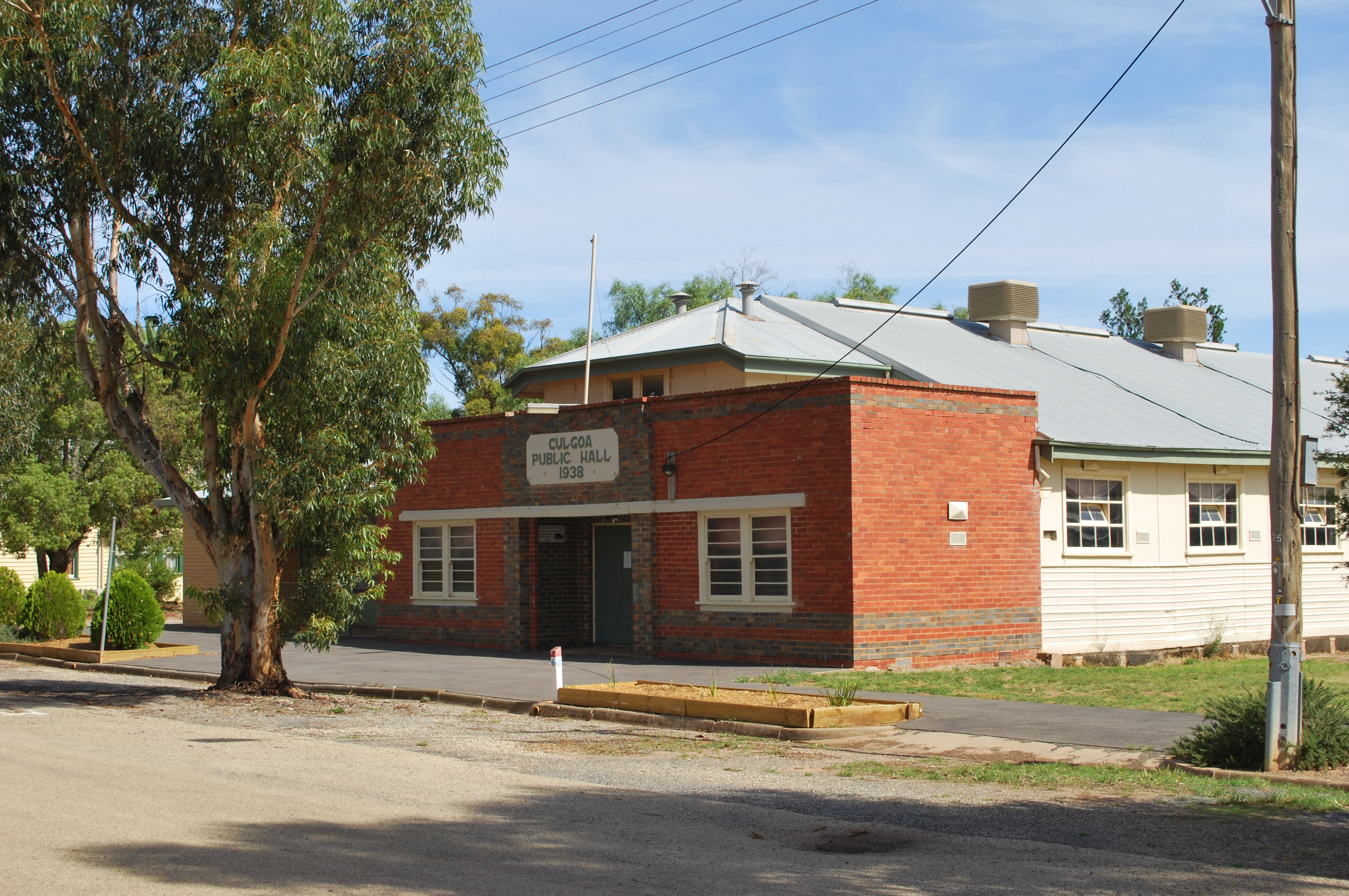
Public hall, built in 1938

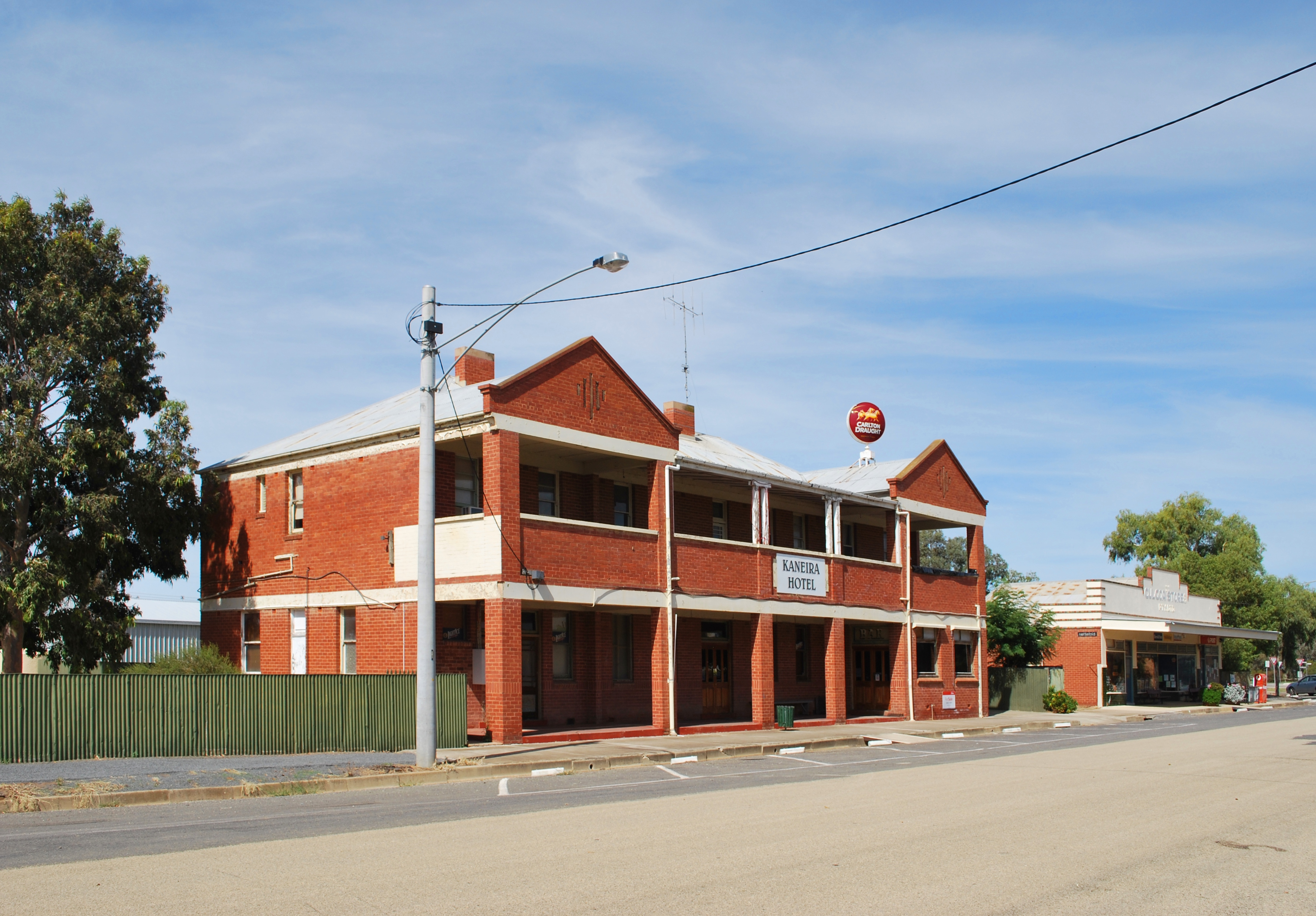
Kaneira Hotel

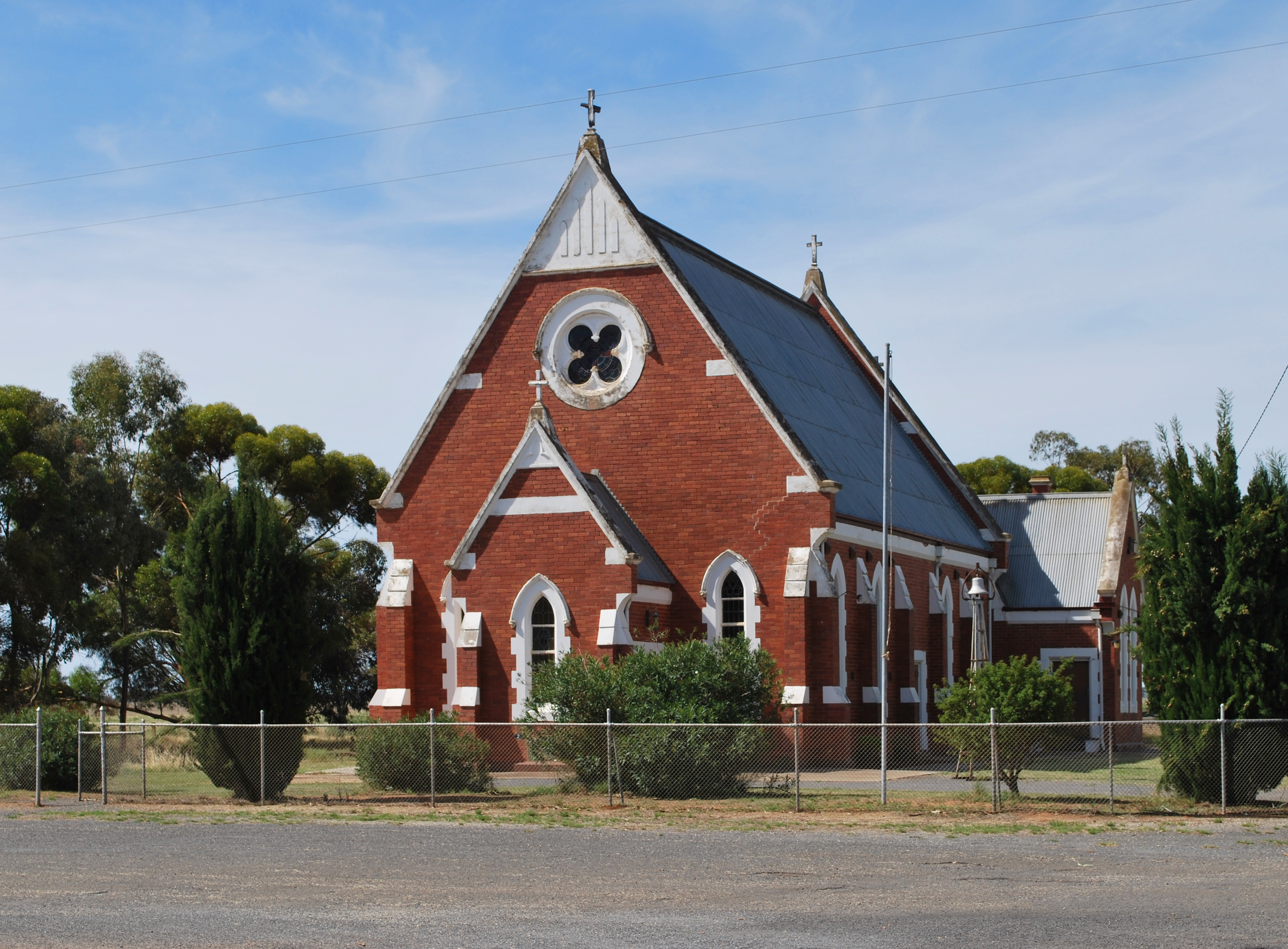
Sacred Heart Roman Catholic church
