= Fingal, Victoria =

Fingal
- Town
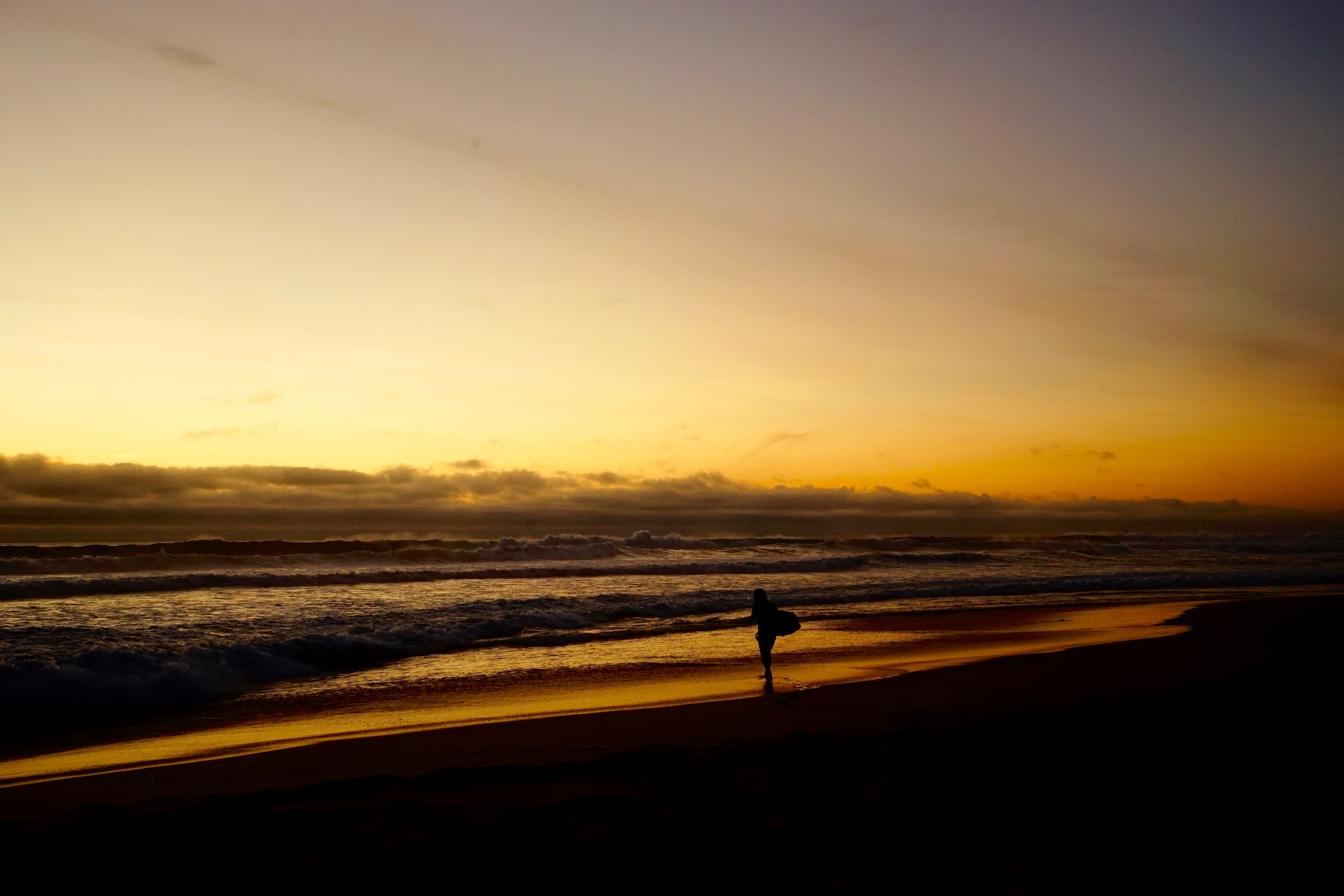
- Gunnamatta Beach, January 2017

- Interactive map of Fingal
- Coordinates: 38°25′16″S 144°51′40″E
- Country: Australia
- State: Victoria
- LGA: Shire of Mornington Peninsula

Government
  - State electorate: Hastings
  - Federal division: Flinders

Population
  - Total: 637 (2021 census)
- Postcode: 3939
Localities around Fingal
Rye	Tootgarook	Boneo
Rye	Fingal	Boneo
St Andrews Beach	Bass Strait	Cape Schanck

Fingal is a locality on the Mornington Peninsula in Melbourne, Victoria, Australia, approximately 66 km (41 mi) south of Melbourne's Central Business District, located within the Shire of Mornington Peninsula local government area. Fingal recorded a population of 637 at the 2021 census.

Fingal abuts Bass Strait along Gunnamatta Beach and is located between the suburbs of Rye and St Andrews Beach.

Fingal is home to many family friendly attractions such as the Peninsula Hot Springs, Moonah Links Golf Course. There are great walking tracks along the beaches to explore.

== See also ==
- Shire of Flinders – Fingal was previously within this former local government area.
- List of Melbourne suburbs
- Mornington Peninsula
