= Teddywaddy West =

Teddywaddy West Victoria
- Coordinates: 36°11′48″S 143°12′16″E
- Population: 12 (SAL 2021)
- Postcode(s): 3527
- Location: 238 km (148 mi) NW of Melbourne; 82 km (51 mi) SW of Kerang; 13 km (8 mi) S of Wycheproof
- LGA(s): Shire of Buloke
- State electorate(s): Mildura
- Federal division(s): Mallee
Localities around Teddywaddy West:
| Chirrip | Wycheproof South | Wycheproof |
| Granite Flat | Teddywaddy West | Teddywaddy |
| Wooroonook | Wooroonook | Charlton |

Teddywaddy West is a locality in the local government area of the Shire of Buloke, Victoria, Australia.
