= Kalpienung =

- Town
- Coordinates: 35°47′0″S 143°16′0″E
- Country: Australia
- State: Victoria
- LGA: Shire of Buloke
- Location: 311 km (193 mi) from Melbourne; 35 km (22 mi) from Wycheproof; 64 km (40 mi) from Charlton; 170 km (110 mi) from Bendigo

Population
  - Total: 28 (2016 census)
- Postcode: 3529
Localities around Kalpienung
Warne	Cokum	Cokum
Nullawil	Kalpienung	Towaninny
Dumosa	Dumosa	Towaninny South

Kalpienung is a locality in Victoria, Australia, located approximately 35 km from Wycheproof, Victoria.

Kalpienung Post Office opened on 8 November 1890 and closed in 1941.
