= Nullawil =

Nullawil Victoria
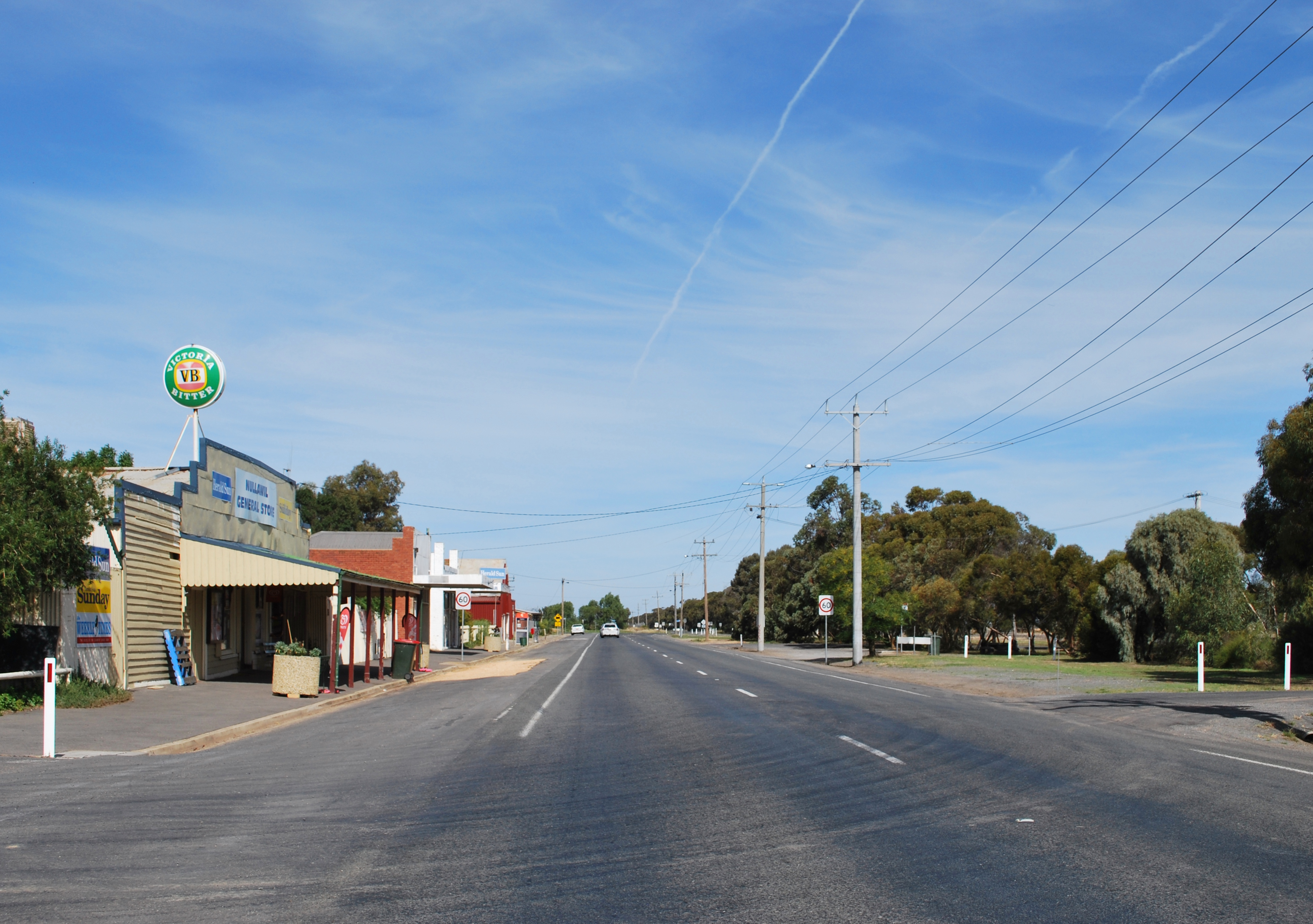
- Calder Highway passing through Nullawil, 2012

- Coordinates: 35°51′0″S 143°11′0″E
- Population: 92 (2021 census)
- Postcode(s): 3529
- Location: 302 km (188 mi) NW of Melbourne; 162 km (101 mi) NW of Bendigo; 80 km (50 mi) SW of Swan Hill; 56 km (35 mi) NW of Charlton; 26 km (16 mi) NW of Wycheproof
- LGA(s): Shire of Buloke
- State electorate(s): Mildura
- Federal division(s): Mallee
Localities around Nullawil:
Warne	Warne	Kalpienung
Jil Jil	Nullawil	Kalpienung
Whirily	Dumosa	Dumosa

Nullawil is a town in Victoria, Australia, located approximately 302 kilometres (188 mi) from the state capital, Melbourne. At the 2021 census, Nullawil had a population of 92.

It is thought that the name of the settlement derives from two Aboriginal words: "nulla", meaning killing stick, and "wil", from "willock", meaning galah.

The railway came to Nullawil in March 1895, when the line was extended from Wycheproof to Sea Lake. Passenger services ceased in May 1977. The post office opened on 26 April 1897.

== Gallery ==
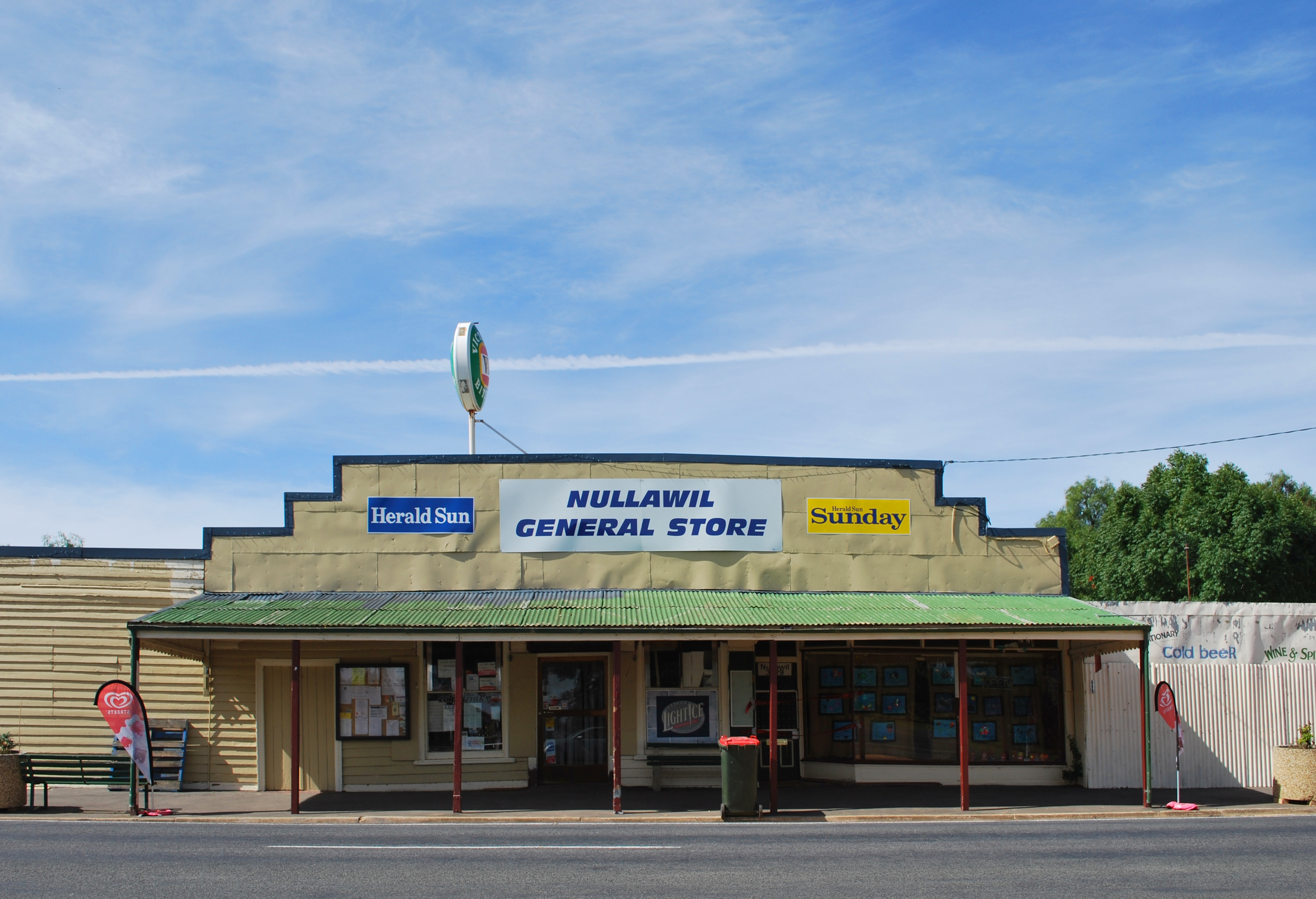
General store, 2012

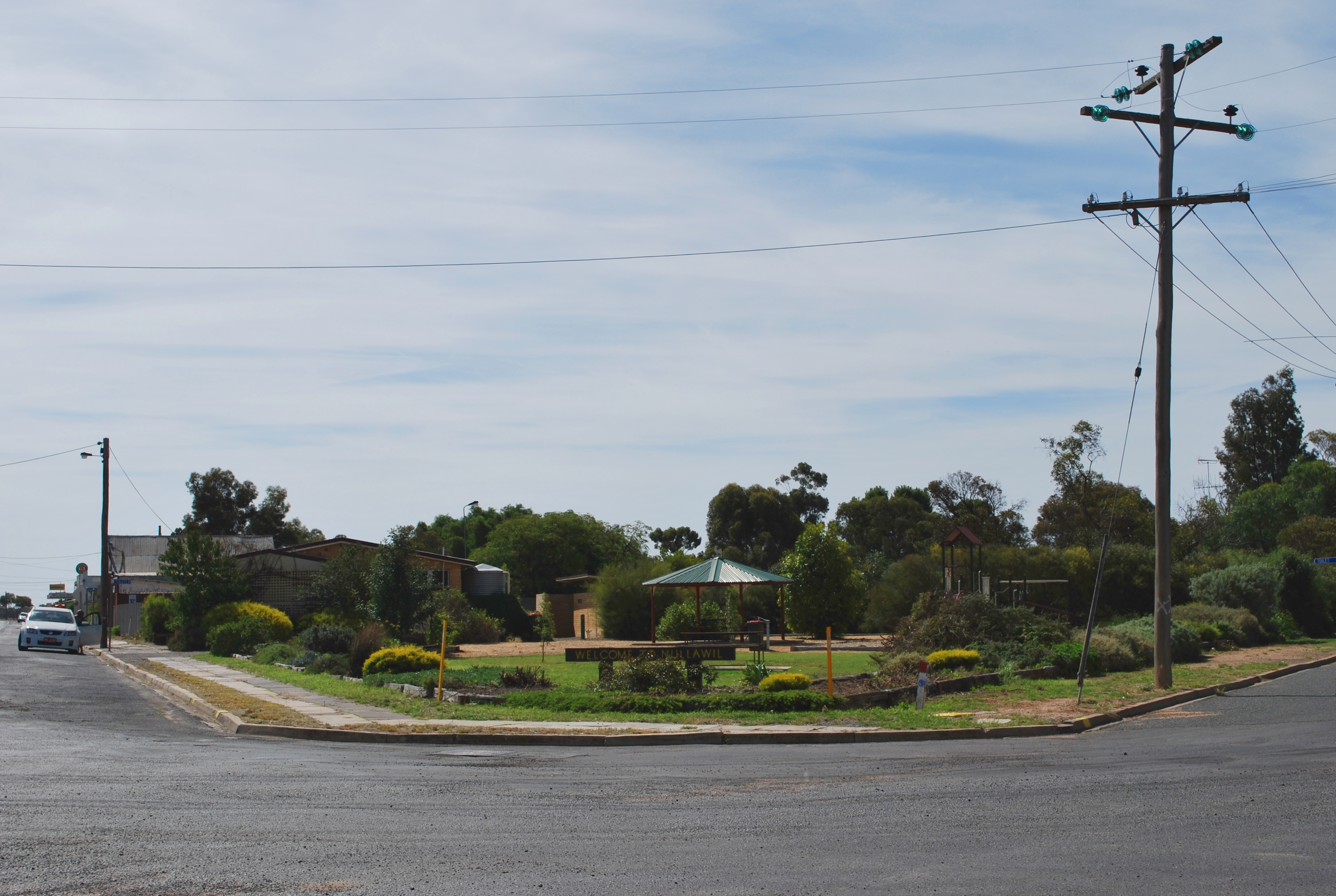
Town park, 2012

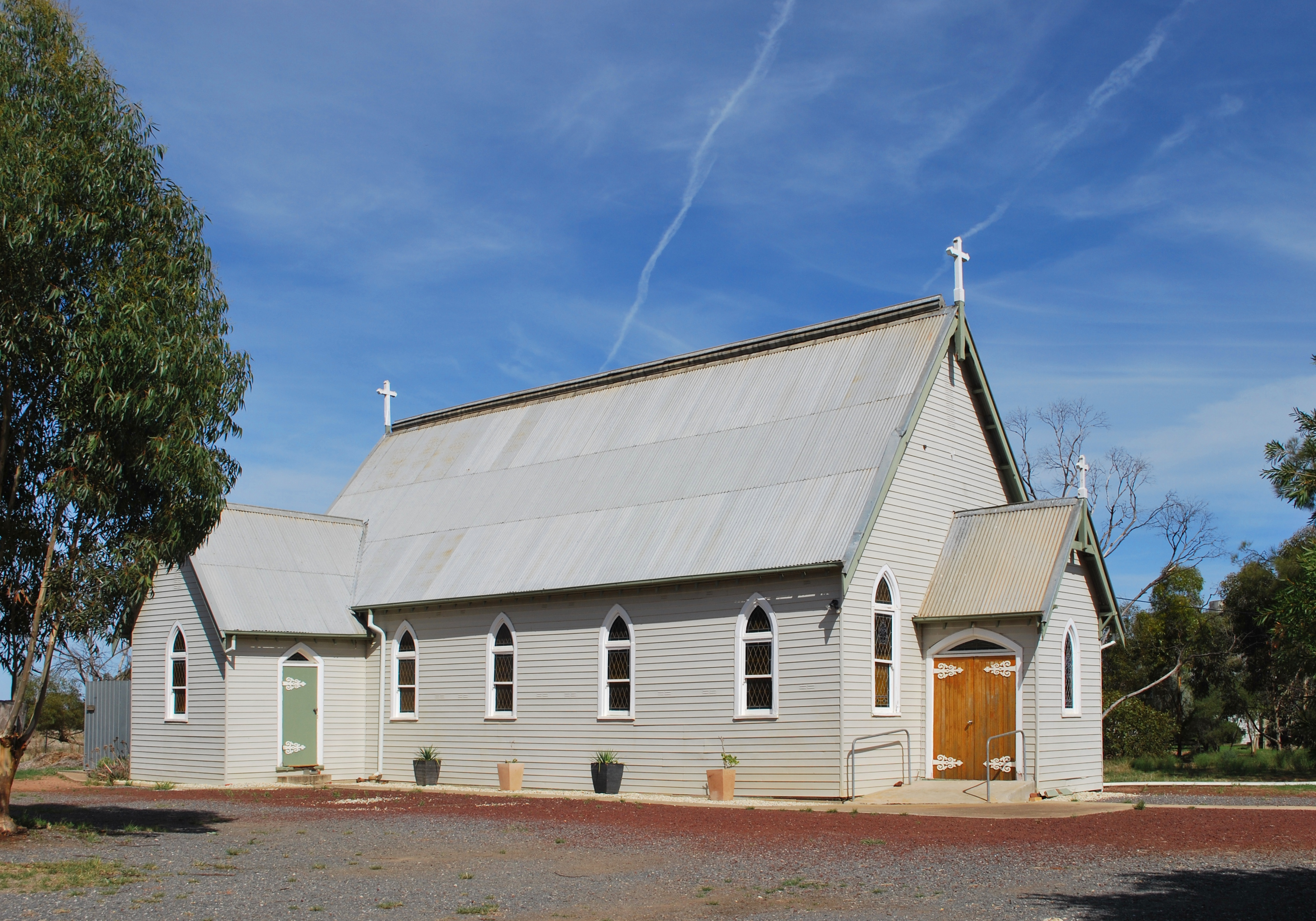
St Joseph's Catholic Church, 2012
