= Karyrie =

- Town
- Coordinates: 35°57′41″S 142°51′27″E
- Country: Australia
- State: Victoria
- LGA: Shire of Buloke

Government
  - State electorate: Mildura
  - Federal division: Mallee

Population
  - Total: 20 (2016 census)
- Postcode: 3483
Localities around Karyrie
Curyo	Marlbed	Jil Jil
Kinnabulla	Karyrie	Whirily
Ballapur	Birchip West	Birchip

Karyrie is a locality in the Shire of Buloke, Victoria, Australia. Karyrie had a station on the Mildura railway line which is now closed between Kinnabulla station and Birchip station. The post office in the locality opened on 19 November 1892 and was closed on 15 November 1919.
