= Corack East =

- Town
- Coordinates: 36°10′04″S 143°02′29″E
- Country: Australia
- State: Victoria
- LGA: Shire of Buloke
- Location: 250 km (160 mi) NW of Melbourne; 96 km (60 mi) SW of Horsham; 59 km (37 mi) SE of Berriwillock

Government
  - State electorate: Mildura
  - Federal division: Mallee

Population
  - Total: 22 (2016 census)
- Postcode: 3480
Localities around Corack East
Thalia	Thalia	Thalia
Corack	Corack East	Chirrip
Corack	Corack	Granite Flat

Corack East is a locality in the Shire of Buloke, Victoria, Australia. A rural CFA station is located in the town. Corack East post office opened on 1 August 1891 and was closed on 24 May 1976.
