= Myall (disambiguation) =

Myall is a group of the Acacia species of plants.

Myall may also refer to:

== People ==
- Douglas Myall (1922–2019), British civil servant and philatelist
- Ivan Myall (born 1947), English swimmer
- Kearnan Myall (born 1986), English rugby player
- Stuart Myall (born 1974), English footballer

== Places ==
- Myall, Victoria, a locality in the Shire of Gannawarra
- Myall, Victoria (Shire of Buloke), a locality
- Myall Creek, New South Wales, a rural locality
  - Myall Creek massacre, in New South Wales
  - Myall Creek Massacre and Memorial Site
- Myall Islands, Antarctica
- Myall Lakes, New South Wales
  - Myall Lakes National Park, New South Wales
- Myall Park, Queensland, a rural locality
  - Myall Park Botanic Garden, Queensland
- Myall River, New South Wales
- Weeping Myall Woodlands, in Queensland and New South Wales
