= Granite Flat =

- Town
- Coordinates: 36°13′04″S 143°08′48″E
- Country: Australia
- State: Victoria
- LGA: Shire of Buloke
- Location: 240 km (150 mi) NW of Melbourne; 100 km (62 mi) NE of Horsham; 17 km (11 mi) SE of Wycheproof

Government
  - State electorate: Mildura
  - Federal division: Mallee

Population
  - Total: N/A (2016 census)
- Postcode: 3525
Localities around Granite Flat
Corack East	Chirrip	Teddywaddy West
Corack	Granite Flat	Teddywaddy West
Jeffcott North	Jeffcott North	Wooroonook

Granite Flat is a locality in the local government area of the Shire of Buloke, Victoria, Australia. Its post office opened in 1902, and was closed on 27 March 1908.
