= Chirrip =

- Town
- Coordinates: 36°10′14″S 143°08′47″E
- Country: Australia
- State: Victoria
- LGA: Shire of Buloke
- Location: 244 km (152 mi) NW of Melbourne; 120 km (75 mi) SW of Bendigo; 12 km (7.5 mi) SW of Wycheproof

Government
  - State electorate: Mildura
  - Federal division: Mallee

Population
  - Total: 8 (2016 census)
- Postcode: 3525
Localities around Chirrip
Thalia	Thalia	Wycheproof South
Corack East	Chirrip	Teddywaddy West
Corack	Granite Flat	Teddywaddy West

Chirrip is a locality in the Shire of Buloke, Victoria, Australia.

The post office there opened as 'Chirrup' [sic] on 6 December 1890, and was closed on 29 February 1964.
