= Banyan, Victoria =

Banyan Victoria
- Coordinates: 35°38′57″S 142°45′54″E
- Population: 25 (2016 census)
- Postcode(s): 3485
- LGA(s): Shire of Buloke
- State electorate(s): Mildura
- Federal division(s): Mallee
Localities around Banyan:
Myall	Sea Lake	Boigbeat
Woomelang	Banyan	Berriwillock
Woomelang	Willangie	Willangie

Banyan is a locality in the Shire of Buloke, Victoria, Australia. A post office operated there from 1 October 1912 until 14 May 1946.
