= Capel Sound =

- Suburb
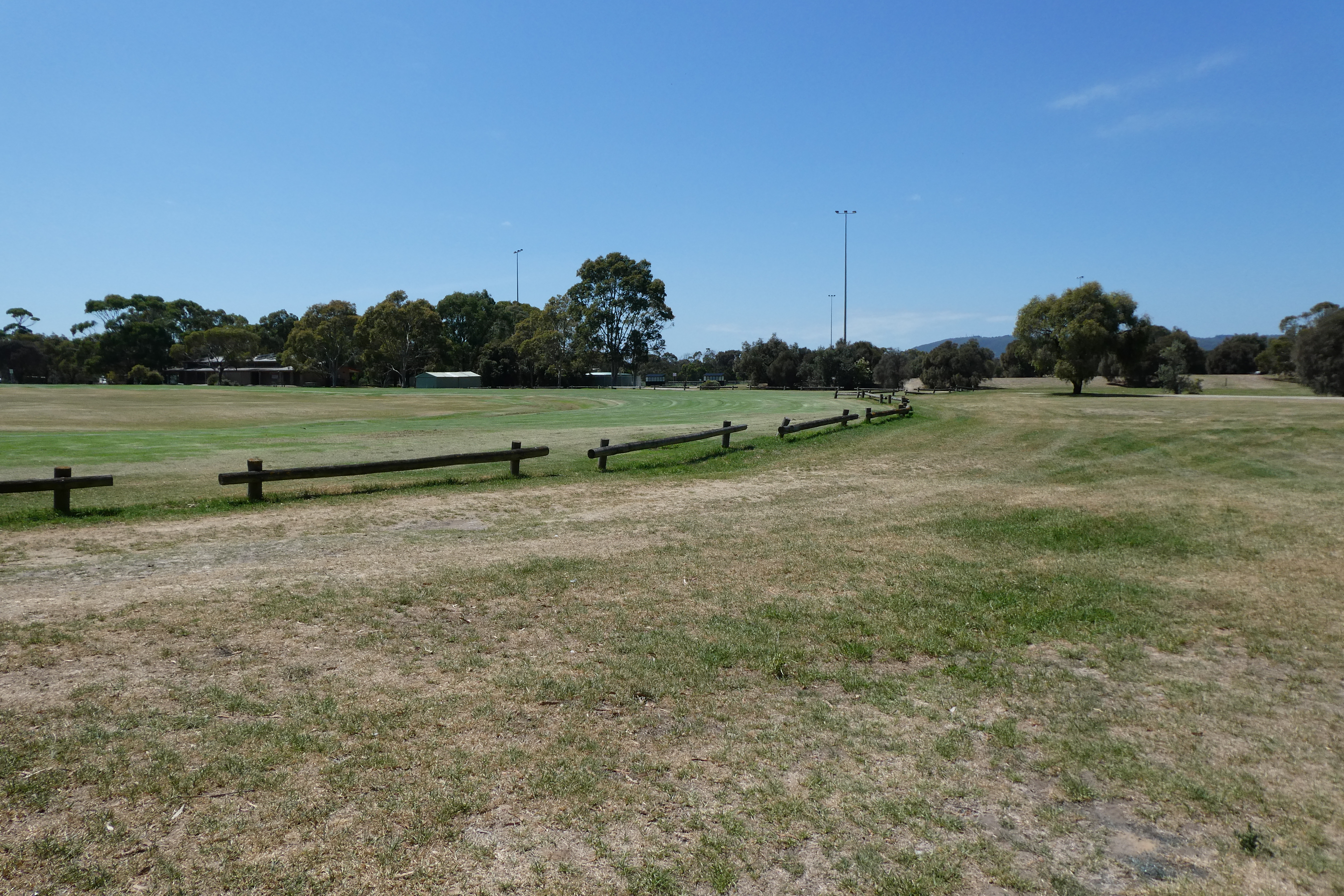
- Truemans Road Recreation Reserve

- Interactive map of Capel Sound
- Coordinates: 38.377°S 144.872°E
- Country: Australia
- State: Victoria
- City: Melbourne
- LGA: Shire of Mornington Peninsula
- Location: 79 km (49 mi) from Melbourne; 4 km (2.5 mi) from Rosebud
- Established: 15 September 2016

Government
  - State electorate: Nepean
  - Federal division: Flinders

Area
  - Total: 4.6 km^{2} (1.8 sq mi)

Population
  - Total: 5,246 (2021 census)
  - Density: 1,140/km^{2} (2,950/sq mi)
- Postcode: 3940
Suburbs around Capel Sound
	Port Phillip
Tootgarook	Capel Sound	Rosebud
	Boneo

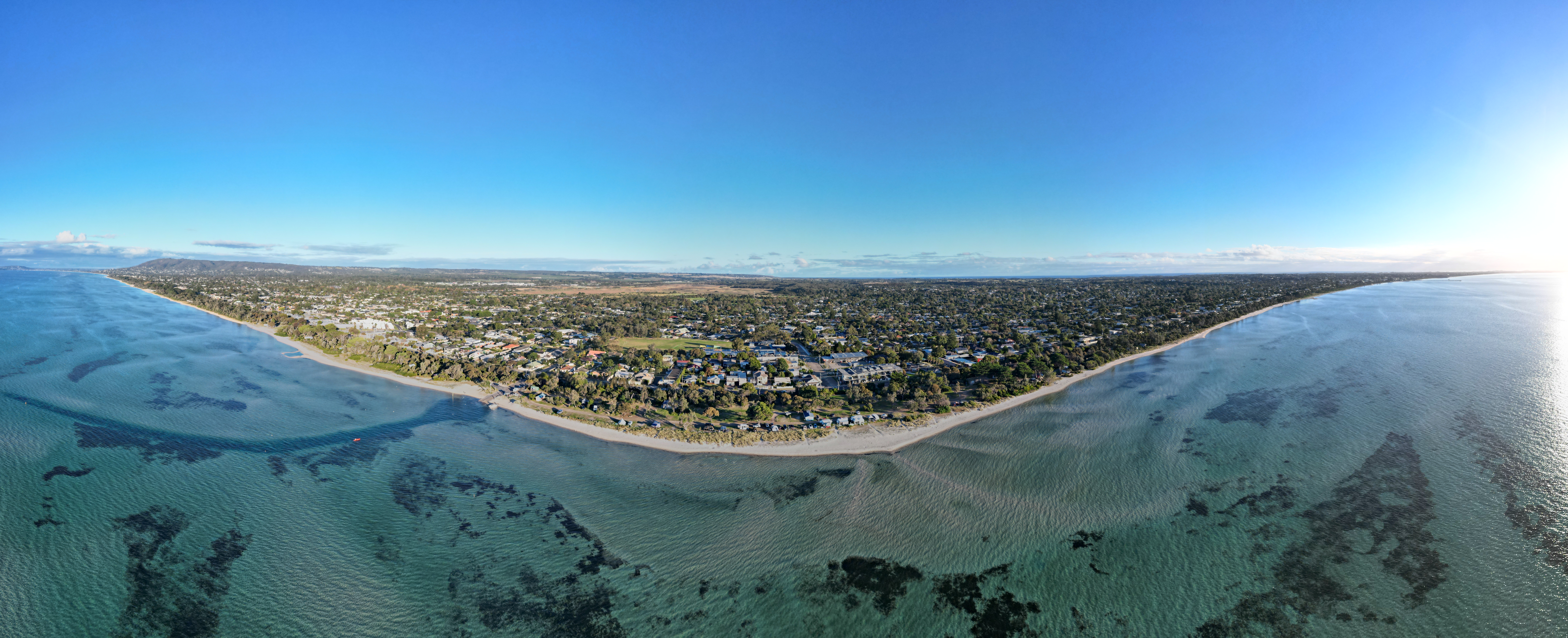
Capel Sound aerial panorama. April 2024.

Capel Sound is a suburb on the Mornington Peninsula in Melbourne, Victoria, Australia, 61 km (38 mi) south of Melbourne's central business district, located within the Shire of Mornington Peninsula local government area. Capel Sound recorded a population of 5,246 at the 2021 census.

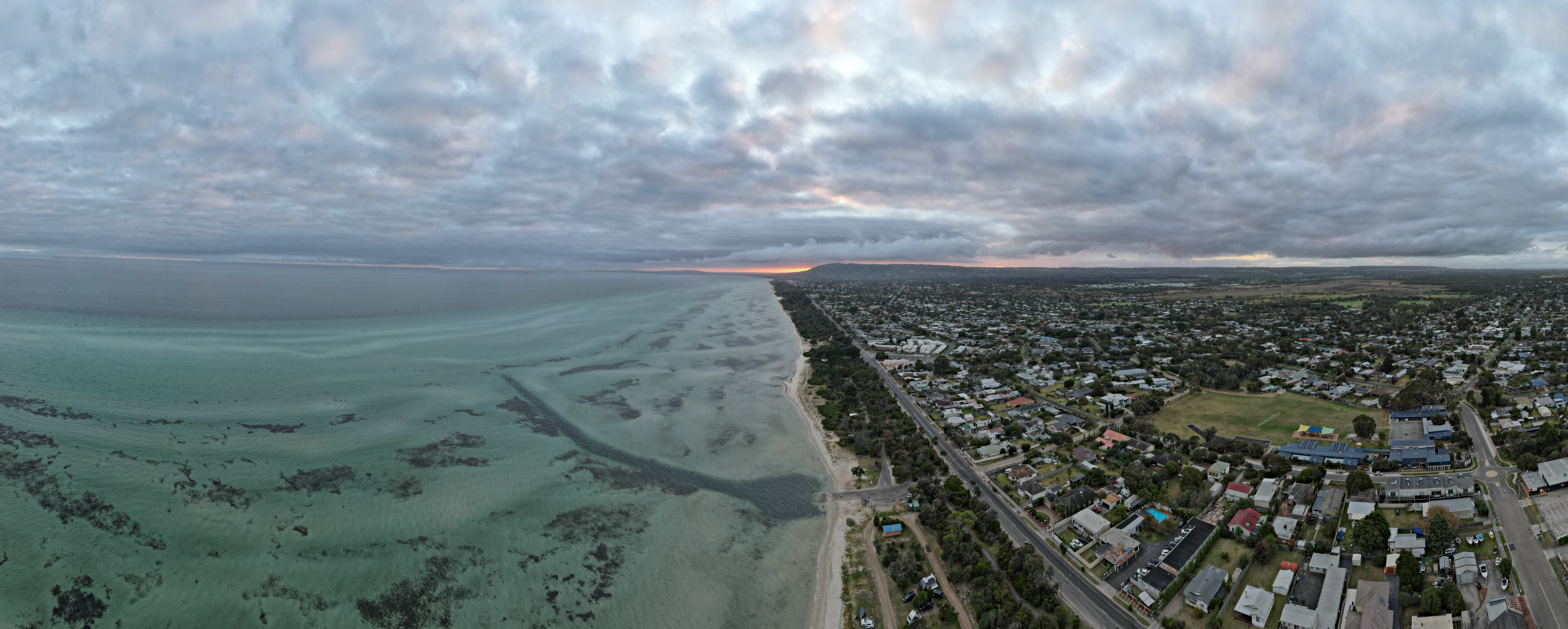
Capel Sound from above during sunrise. April 2024.

A distinguishing landmark feature of Capel Sound is the Tootgarook Swamp, the largest example left of a shallow freshwater marsh in the Port Phillip bay region. The swamp is also described by Melbourne Water as a ground water dependent ecosystem. The 381 hectare swamp is found on the lower section of the Mornington Peninsula in Victoria, Australia. A large portion of the Tootgarook Swamp is zoned as residential and industrial, with roughly half of the actual swamp inside the green wedge and half within the urban growth boundary.

== History ==
Rosebud West Post Office opened on 12 January 1938 and closed around 1996.

The town kept the name of the post office until an effort to change the name began in 2015. Proponents hoped a name change would distance the town from being seen as only an economically disadvantaged suburb of nearby Rosebud. About 56% of residents surveyed voted in favor of the name change. On 15 September 2016, Mornington Peninsula Shire Council officially changed the name from Rosebud West to Capel Sound. The new name was derived from an 1836 survey chart of the area, and was already in use by local businesses such as The Capel Sound Shopping Village.
