= Dumosa =

- Town
- Coordinates: 35°55′0″S 143°13′0″E
- Country: Australia
- State: Victoria
- LGA: Shire of Buloke
- Location: 296 km (184 mi) from Melbourne; 21 km (13 mi) from Wycheproof; 50 km (31 mi) from Charlton; 156 km (97 mi) from Bendigo

Government
  - State electorate: Mildura
  - Federal division: Mallee

Population
  - Total: 24 (2016 census)
- Postcode: 3527
Localities around Dumosa
Whirily	Nullawil	Kalpienung
Whirily	Dumosa	Towaninny South
Narraport	Wycheproof	Wycheproof

Dumosa is a locality in Victoria, Australia, located approximately 21 km from Wycheproof, Victoria.

Dumosa was named after the tree White Mallee (Eucalyptus dumosa) which is common in the area. Dumosa Post Office opened on 6 July 1908 and closed in 1964.
