= Boigbeat =

- Town
- Coordinates: 35°34′0″S 142°55′0″E
- Country: Australia
- State: Victoria
- LGA: Shire of Buloke
- Location: 343 km (213 mi) from Melbourne; 74 km (46 mi) from Swan Hill; 11 km (6.8 mi) from Berriwillock; 9 km (5.6 mi) from Sea Lake
- Elevation: 77 m (253 ft)

Population
  - Total: 8 (2016 census)
- Postcode: 3531
Localities around Boigbeat
Sea Lake	Sea Lake	Springfield
Banyan	Boigbeat	Springfield
Banyan	Berriwillock	Berriwillock

Boigbeat is a locality situated in The Mallee region. It is situated about 9 kilometres south east of Sea Lake and 11 kilometres north west of Berriwillock.

The place name Boigbeat is derived from the traditional Aboriginal word for the location which was Boigbeal with the word beal meaning "redgum" and referring to the only clump of gum trees for many miles.

Boigbeat Post Office opened on 1 July 1898 and closed in 1970.
