= Sutton, Victoria =

Sutton Victoria
- Coordinates: 35°44′14″S 142°58′30″E
- Population: 0 (2016 census)
- Postcode(s): 3530
- LGA(s): Shire of Buloke
- State electorate(s): Mildura
- Federal division(s): Mallee
Localities around Sutton:
Berriwillock	Berriwillock	Culgoa
Willangie	Sutton	Culgoa
Marlbed	Jil Jil	Warne

Sutton is a locality in the local government area of the Shire of Buloke, Victoria, Australia.
