= Myall Islands =

Islands off the coast of Enderby Land, Antarctica

- Location within Antarctica

Geography
- Location: Antarctica
- Coordinates: 67°40′S 45°43′E

Administration
- Administered under the Antarctic Treaty System

Demographics
- Population: Uninhabited

The Myall Islands are an archipelago of two islands lying close west of the Thala Hills, off the coast of Enderby Land. They were first plotted from air photos taken from ANARE (Australian National Antarctic Research Expeditions) aircraft in 1956. Named by Antarctic Names Committee of Australia (ANCA) after Myall the vernacular name for a species of Acacia found in Australia.

== See also ==
- List of Antarctic and sub-Antarctic islands
