= Springfield, Victoria (Shire of Buloke) =

Springfield Victoria
- Coordinates: 35°35′0″S 143°07′0″E
- Population: 3 (2016 census)
- Postcode(s): 3544
- Location: 335 km (208 mi) from Melbourne; 53 km (33 mi) from Swan Hill; 121 km (75 mi) from Ouyen; 225 km (140 mi) from Mildura
- LGA(s): Shire of Buloke
Localities around Springfield:
Tyrrell, Sea Lake	Waitchie	Chinangin
Boigbeat	Springfield	Murnungin
Berriwillock	Culgoa	Wangie

Springfield is a locality in Victoria, Australia, located approximately 53 km from Swan Hill, Victoria.

Springfield Post Office opened in 1902, was renamed Springfield Station around 1907 (there was another Springfield Post Office near Woodend) and closed in 1930.
