= Marlbed =

- Town
- Coordinates: 35°49′23″S 142°51′10″E
- Country: Australia
- State: Victoria
- LGA: Shire of Buloke

Government
  - State electorate: Mildura
  - Federal division: Mallee

Population
  - Total: 6 (SAL 2021)
- Postcode: 3483
Localities around Marlbed
Watchupga	Willangie	Sutton
Curyo	Marlbed	Jil Jil
Kinnabulla	Karyrie	Whirily

Marlbed is a locality in the Shire of Buloke, Victoria, Australia. Marlbed post office opened on 1 August 1888, was renamed Jil Jil on 1 May 1911 and was closed on 31 January 1943.
