= Wangie =

- Town
- Coordinates: 35°41′58″S 143°16′59″E
- Country: Australia
- State: Victoria
- LGA: Shire of Buloke

Government
  - State electorate: Mildura
  - Federal division: Mallee

Population
  - Total: 0 (2021 census)
- Postcode: 3530
Localities around Wangie
Springfield	Murnungin	Lalbert
Culgoa	Wangie	Lalbert
Culgoa	Cokum	Tittybong

Wangie is a town in the local government area of the Shire of Buloke, Victoria, Australia. At the 2021 census, Wangie had a population of 0.
