= Watchupga =

- Town
- Coordinates: 35°45′28″S 142°43′33″E
- Country: Australia
- State: Victoria
- LGA: Shire of Buloke

Government
  - State electorate: Mildura
  - Federal division: Mallee

Population
  - Total: 43 (SAL 2021)
- Postcode: 3485
Localities around Watchupga
Woomelang	Woomelang	Willangie
Hopetoun	Watchupga	Willangie
Beulah	Curyo	Marlbed

Watchupga is a locality in Northern Victoria, Australia. The local government area of Watchupga is the Shire of Buloke. Watchupga has a grain station on the Mildura railway line with a grain silo on the site which is 84 metres tall. However, the station was closed to passenger and parcels traffic on 11 November 1975. Watchupga Post Office opened on 23 July 1900 and was closed on 29 February 1972.
