= Mount Wycheproof =

Shortest mountain in the world, in Wycheproof, Victoria, Australia

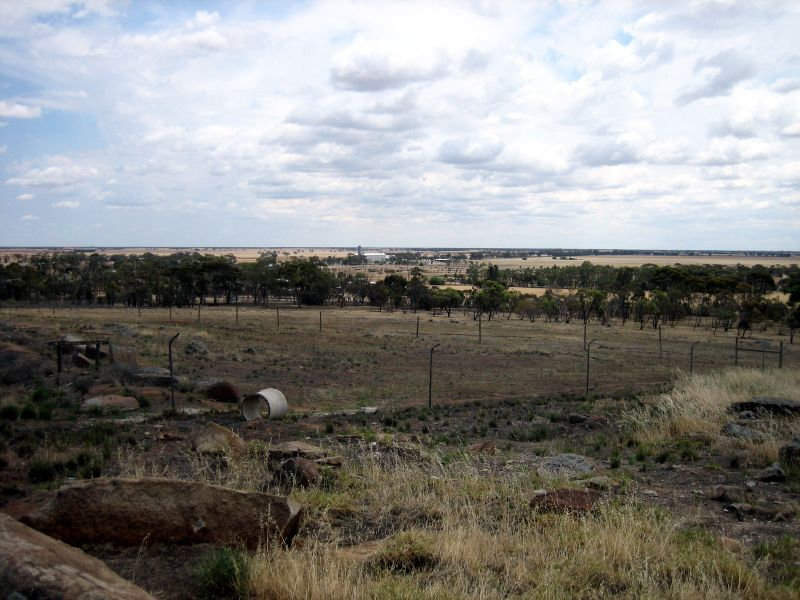
- View from the Mount Wycheproof lookout

Highest point
- Elevation: 148 metres (486 ft) AHD
- Prominence: 42 metres (138 ft) AHD
- Coordinates: 36°4′37″S 143°14′2″E

Geography
- Location within Victoria
- Location: Wycheproof, Victoria, Australia
- Parent range: Terrick Terrick Range

Mount Wycheproof is a location in the small town of Wycheproof, Victoria, Australia, which stands at 42 metres (138 ft) above the surrounding terrain and 147 metres (482 ft) above sea level. The township of Wycheproof is located on the hillside, and a unique geological substance known as Wycheproofite is exclusive to the local area.

== History ==
The township of Wycheproof is located on the mountain’s south western slopes. The settlement was started as early as 1846, but the township was not surveyed until 1875. The name 'Wycheproof' originates from the local Aboriginal language, 'wichi-poorp', meaning 'grass on a hill'. The mountain plays a role in the local community, with annual races to the summit. There are many walking tracks in the area, and local wildlife such as emus and kangaroos can be seen.

== Geology ==
Mount Wycheproof is a granite outcrop. Located in a flat grassland area, the rounded terrain of Mount Wycheproof is consistent with that of the surrounding area. Sharing several similarities to nearby Pyramid Hill, Mount Wycheproof is part of the low-lying Terrick Terrick range. The mountain rises to a height of 147 metres (482 ft) above sea level or only 42 metres (138 ft) above the surrounding plains. The hill is characterised by a rocky, conical peak, common in the western areas of Victoria. Phosphate materials are relatively rare in Victoria, yet the Wycheproof area is known to have its own unique mineral, known as wycheproofite. Wycheproofite can be characterised by its pinkish colour and its transparency.
