= Tootgarook =

Tootgarook Melbourne, Victoria
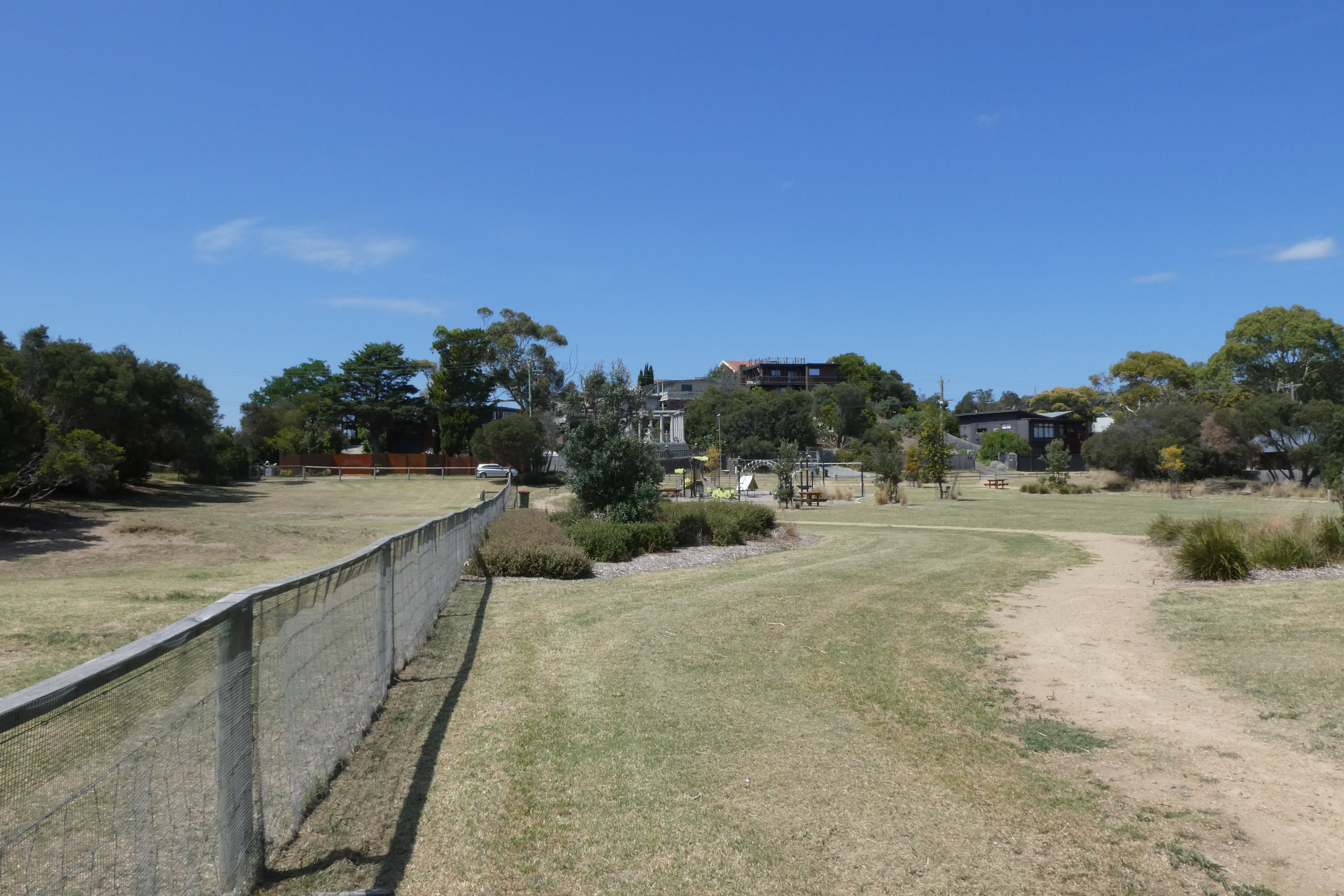
- Tootgarook Recreation Reserve

- Coordinates: 38.374°S 144.849°E
- Population: 3,178 (2021 census)
  - Density: 883/km^{2} (2,290/sq mi)
- Established: 1850
- Postcode(s): 3941
- Area: 3.6 km^{2} (1.4 sq mi)
- Location: 81 km (50 mi) from Melbourne; 7 km (4 mi) from Rosebud
- LGA(s): Shire of Mornington Peninsula
- State electorate(s): Nepean
- Federal division(s): Flinders
Suburbs around Tootgarook:
	Port Phillip
Rye	Tootgarook	Capel Sound
	Cape Schanck	Boneo

Tootgarook (/ˈtʊtɡərʊk/ TUUT-gə-ruuk) is a suburb on the Mornington Peninsula in Melbourne, Victoria, Australia, 62 km (39 mi) south of Melbourne's Central Business District, located within the Shire of Mornington Peninsula local government area. Tootgarook recorded a population of 3,178 at the 2021 census. Tootgarook is located within Boonwurrung Country.

== History ==
Tootgarook is an Aboriginal word meaning "Croaking of frogs". Tootgarook is located within Boonwurrung Country.

The town is named from the pastoral run of J. Purves established adjacent to the west of the Tootgarook Swamp (now Wetland). Purves retained the name as his pre-emptive right.

A Tootgarook Post Office opened in 1858 and was renamed Rye in 1870. A later Tootgarook Post Office opened on 3 April 1956 when some development took place in the suburb, and closed in 1987

== Today ==
In the same suburb, but extending to neighbouring suburbs, is the Tootgarook Wetland. This wetland is about 300 hectares in size and supports many rare and endangered species of flora and fauna. Most of the wetland is in private ownership and some is vulnerable to development.

The local school in the area is Tootgarook Primary School, which currently has 203 students.

== See also ==
- Shire of Flinders – Tootgarook was previously within this former local government area.
- List of places in Victoria (Australia) named from pastoral runs
