= Curyo =

- Town
- Coordinates: 35°51′01″S 142°46′59″E
- Country: Australia
- State: Victoria
- LGA: Shire of Buloke

Government
  - State electorate: Mildura
  - Federal division: Mallee

Population
  - Total: 26 (2016 census)
- Postcode: 3483
Localities around Curyo
Hopetoun	Watchupga	Marlbed
Beulah	Curyo	Marlbed
Beulah	Kinnabulla	Karyrie

Curyo is a locality in the Mallee Ward of the Shire of Buloke, Victoria, Australia. Curyo has a Grain Depot on the Mildura railway line; however, the station closed to passenger and parcels traffic on 11 November 1975. A CFA fire brigade in the area is located on Pratt Road, adjacent to the grain depot. The post office there opened on 20 January 1900 and was closed on 9 January 1976. Curyo used to have a football club and a golf course.
