= Willangie =

- Town
- Coordinates: 35°41′59″S 142°47′47″E
- Country: Australia
- State: Victoria
- LGA: Shire of Buloke

Government
  - State electorate: Mildura
  - Federal division: Mallee

Population
  - Total: 35 (SAL 2016)
- Postcode: 3485
Localities around Willangie
Woomelang	Banyan	Berriwillock
Woomelang	Willangie	Sutton
Watchupga	Marlbed	Jil Jil

Willangie is a town in the Shire of Buloke, Victoria, Australia. Willangie was called 'Lenrich' until it adopted its current name. The post office there opened in 1905, renamed 'Lenrich' on 9 March 1922, renamed back to Willangie on 10 September 1925 and was closed on 31 January 1931.
