= Thalia, Victoria =

Thalia
- Town
- Coordinates: 36°05′57″S 143°04′01″E
- Country: Australia
- State: Victoria
- LGA: Shire of Buloke
- Location: 254 km (158 mi) NW of Melbourne; 151 km (94 mi) W of Echuca; 103 km (64 mi) NW of Horsham

Government
  - State electorate: Mildura
  - Federal division: Mallee

Population
  - Total: 4 (SAL 2021)
- Postcode: 3527
Localities around Thalia
| Narraport | Narraport | Wycheproof |
| Morton Plains | Thalia | Wycheproof South |
| Corack | Corack East | Chirrip |

Thalia is a small town in the Shire of Buloke, Victoria, Australia. Thalia post office opened on 14 October 1892 and was closed on 30 June 1969.

As of the 2021 census, Thalia had a population of just four residents, making it one of the least populated localities in Australia. It is also the only locality in which the Churches of Christ is the most practised religion, with three (75%) of the town's residents being members of the church.
