= Cokum =

- Town
- Coordinates: 35°45′28″S 143°17′16″E
- Country: Australia
- State: Victoria
- LGA: Shire of Buloke

Government
  - State electorate: Mildura
  - Federal division: Mallee

Population
  - Total: 3 (2016 census)
- Postcode: 3542
Localities around Cokum
Culgoa	Wangie	Tittybong
Culgoa	Cokum	Tittybong
Warne	Kalpienung	Towaninny

Cokum is a locality in the Shire of Buloke, Victoria, Australia.
