= Tittybong =

- Town
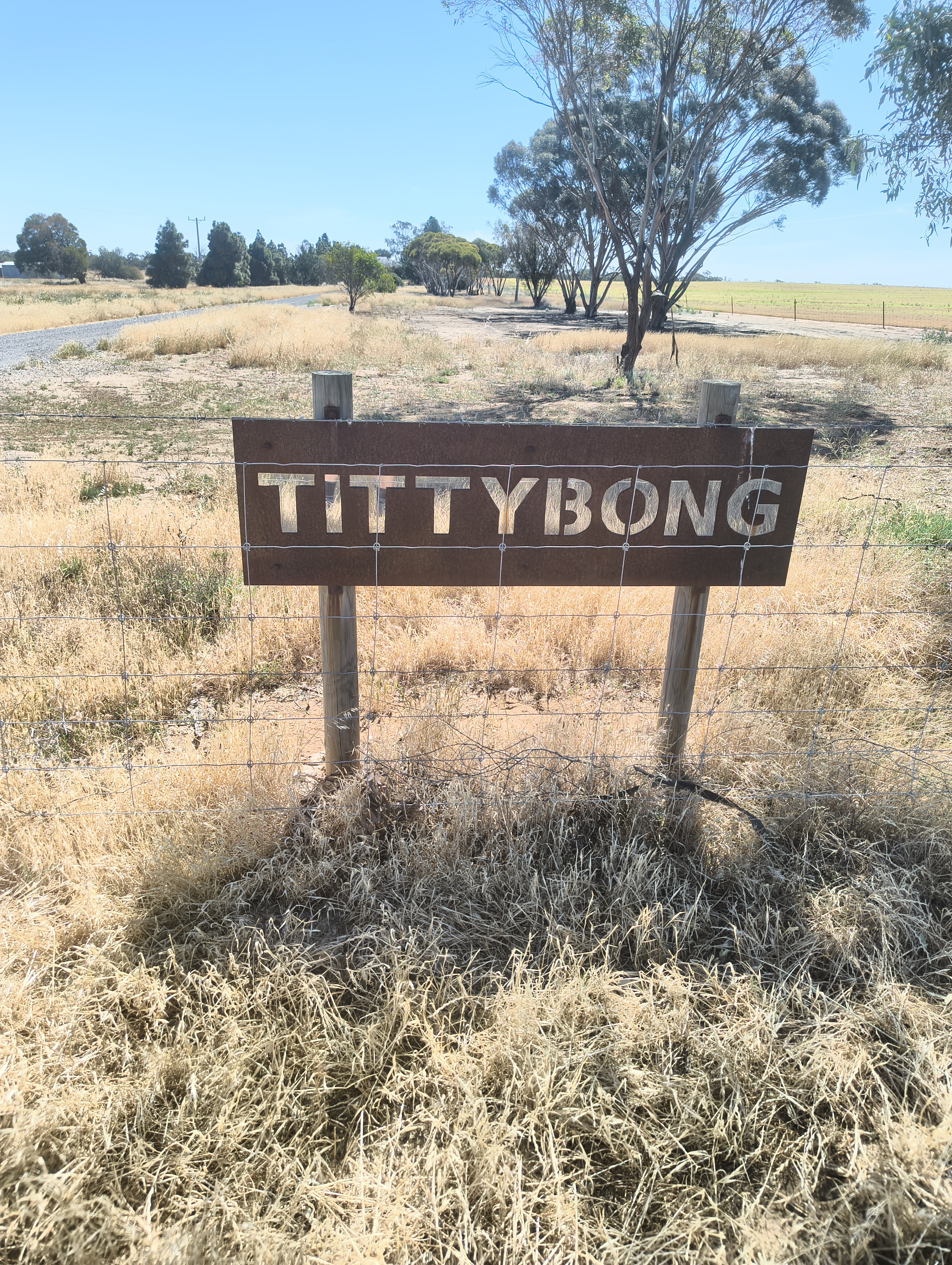

- Coordinates: 35°44′0″S 143°22′0″E
- Country: Australia
- State: Victoria
- LGAs: Shire of Gannawarra; Shire of Buloke

Government
  - State electorate: Murray Plains
  - Federal division: Mallee

Population
  - Total: 3 (2016 census)
- Postcode: 3542
Localities around Tittybong
Wangie	Lalbert	Lalbert
Cokum	Tittybong	Cannie
Towaninny	Towaninny	Quambatook

Tittybong is a locality in the northwest of Victoria, Australia, within the Shires of Gannawarra and Buloke. Tittybong is located west of Kerang and east of the Calder Highway. It is south of Swan Hill, Tittybong's nearest large town. At the 2016 census, Tittybong had a population of 3.

== Name ==
Tittybong has been noted for the explicit connotations of its name. In the 2016 book Mount Buggery to Nowhere Else, summarising the origins of Australian place names, Eamon Evans states that it is unclear where the name Tittybong originates from. One of the early farms in Tittybong was named Cockbum Plains.

== History ==
The Tittybong Post Office opened on 1 January 1884 and closed in 1968. The locality's postcode is 3542.
