= Whirily =

- Town
- Coordinates: 35°54′07″S 142°58′51″E
- Country: Australia
- State: Victoria
- LGA: Shire of Buloke
- Location: 276.5 km (171.8 mi) NW of Melbourne; 10.4 km (6.5 mi) NE of Birchip; 81.7 km (50.8 mi) SW of Swan Hill

Government
  - State electorate: Mildura
  - Federal division: Mallee
- Elevation: 94.88 m (311.3 ft)

Population
  - Total: 25 (2021 census)
- Postcode: 3483
Localities around Whirily
Marlbed	Jil Jil	Nullawil
Karyrie	Whirily	Dumosa
Birchip	Birchip	Narraport

Whirily is a locality in the local government area of the Shire of Buloke, Victoria, Australia. Whirily post office opened on 1 October 1912 and was closed on 1 October 1913.
