= Warne, Victoria =

Warne
- Town
- Coordinates: 35°46′43″S 143°07′10″E
- Country: Australia
- State: Victoria
- LGA: Shire of Buloke

Government
  - State electorate: Mildura
  - Federal division: Mallee

Population
  - Total: 13 (SAL 2021)
- Postcode: 3530
Localities around Warne
Sutton	Culgoa	Cokum
Jil Jil	Warne	Kalpienung
Jil Jil	Nullawil	Nullawil

Warne is a locality in the local government area of the Shire of Buloke, Victoria, Australia. It has a grain station on the Kulwin railway line.
