= Chath Silva =

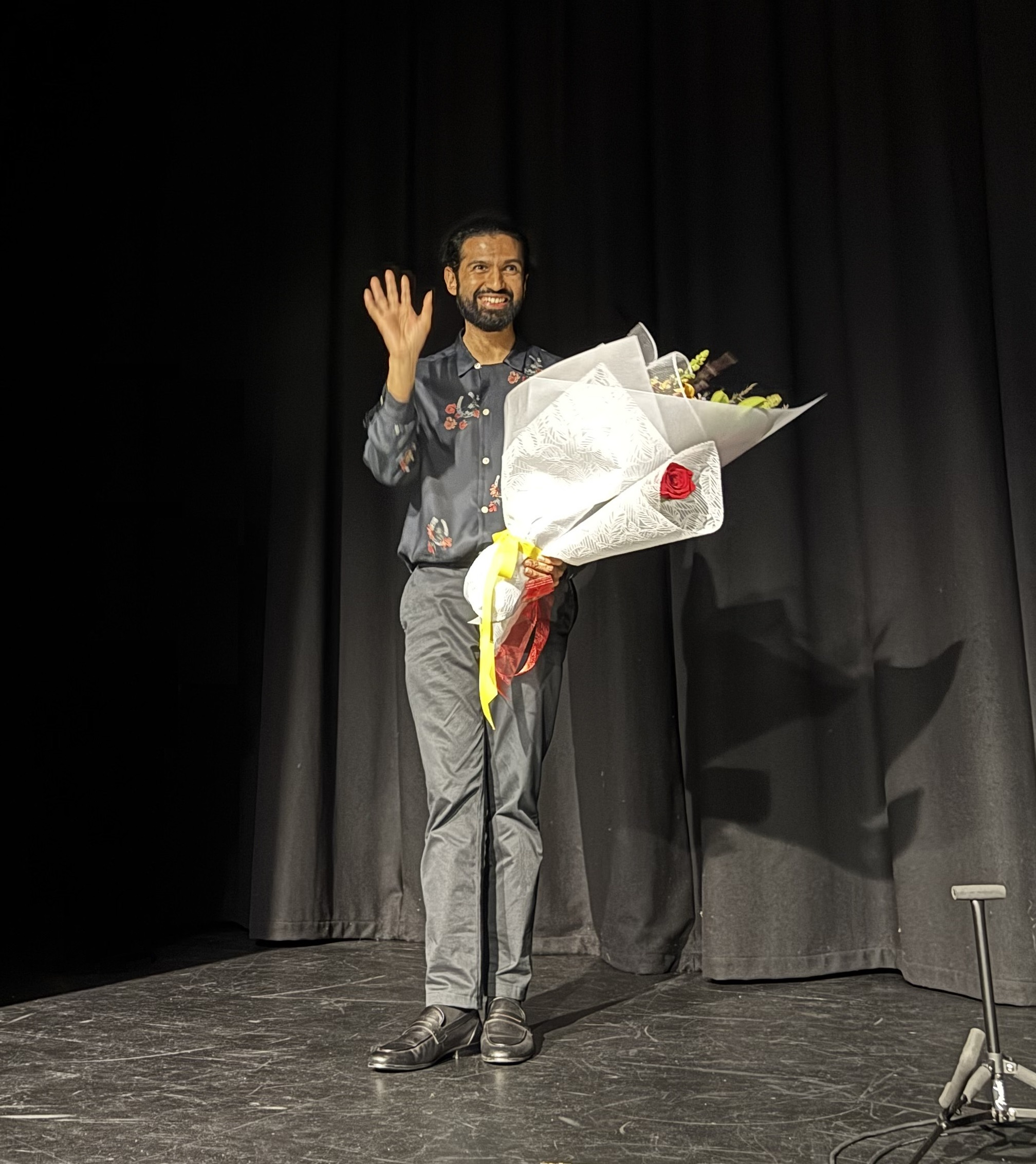
- Silva at Knox Community Arts Centre in Melbourne, 31st May 2025

Background information
- Born: Chathura Saranga Silva; Colombo, Sri Lanka
- Origin: Melbourne, Nationality: Australian
- Genres: Classical music, Contemporary classical
- Occupations: Classical guitarist, Recording artist, Medical doctor
- Instrument: Classical guitar
- Years active: Musician: 2004-present. Medical doctor: 2012-present.
- Label: Distrokid
- Member of: Australasian College of Tropical Medicine (ACTM)

Chath Silva, formally known as Chathura Saranga Silva, is an Australian classical guitarist, recording artist, and medical doctor.

== Early life ==
Chath was born in Colombo, Sri Lanka, to parents Ranjith Silva, a civil engineer, and Rohini Weerakoon, a childcare worker.

He lived and grew up mostly in Birchip, a rural town in the Mallee region of Victoria, Australia. He received his first guitar lessons at Birchip P-12 School from Robyn Ferrier, a music teacher and community leader who served two terms from 2000 to 2008 as mayor for the Buloke Shire Council. Chath was also classically trained by guitarist and iconic figure, Antony Field, now formally known as ‘Mx Tonié Field’, who at the time, was Head of the Classical Guitar Department at the Victorian College of the Arts, and former member of the ARIA award-winning Australian Guitar Quartet, Saffire. Due to scarce resources in rural and remote Victoria, Chath continued to learn music theory via a Victorian Distance Education scheme based in Thornbury, Victoria, now formally known as Virtual School Victoria.

At 15 years of age, after an invitation from the Manager of Rylstone Shire Council, Chath gave his formal debut recital at the Rotary International in the presence of the Governor of New South Wales. At the age of 16, he won second prize for playing Isaac Albeniz's virtuoso piece Asturias (Leyenda) at the Push Start Music Competition, known today as 'Amplify'.

He has also given live performances on ABC Radio, Western Victoria.

== Medical career ==
Chath is a medical doctor (MBBS) who also trained abroad at the Liverpool School of Tropical Medicine in the UK. During this period, he also performed publicly in collaboration with fellow physicians as a guitar quintet named ‘Plasmodium 5 Axe’.

He become a Fellow of the Australasian College of Tropical Medicine (ACTM) before pursuing higher medical studies by graduating with a Master of Medicine in Infection and Immunity from The University of Sydney

== Return to music ==
As a medical student in Australia, he was invited to perform for hospital patients, and also as a medical doctor in work settings as part of a staff Well-Being Program.

His professional concert performances have been described as "enchanting" and of "technical brilliance and heartfelt expression" by The Buloke Times.

He also performs charity concerts, including returning to his home town, whereby proceeds from ticket sales are donated directly to Birchip P-12 School, to be used in their Music Program to educate children.

Throughout his medical career, he also continued to produce numerous solo classical guitar recordings, which are now available to the public on various online music-streaming platforms.

== Discography ==
| Title | Details |
|---|---|
| Complete Preludes (Cello Suites) | Released: May 2023; Label: DistroKid; Format: Online streaming |
| Evocation | Released: January 2021; Label: Distrokid; Format: Online streaming |
| Clair de Lune | Released: September 2019; Label: Distrokid; Format: Online streaming |
| Fantasia on Themes from Verdi's 'La Traviata' | Released: November 2018; Label: Distrokid; Format: Online streaming |
| Caprice No. 24 | Released: May 2018; Label: Distrokid; Format: Online streaming |
| BWV 1007 Prelude | Released: November 2018; Label: Distrokid; Format: Online streaming |
| Aires Andaluces | Released: December 2017; Label: Distrokid; Format: Online streaming |
| Primavera Porteña | Released: July 2016; License: Creative Commons; Format: Online streaming, digital download |
| A La Albéniz | Released: November 2013; License: Creative Commons; Format: Online streaming, digital download |
| God of the Northern Forest | Released: October 2013; License: Creative Commons; Format: Online streaming, digital download |
| BWV 1008 Prelude | Released: August 2013; License: Creative Commons; Format: Online streaming, digital download |
| Preludio No.1 (from Suite à Antiga) | Released: July 2010; License: Creative Commons; Format: Online streaming, digital download |
| Gymnopédie No. 1 | Released: July 2010; License: Creative Commons; Format: Online streaming, digital download |
