= Kinnabulla =

- Town
- Coordinates: 35°53′47″S 142°47′48″E
- Country: Australia
- State: Victoria
- LGA: Shire of Buloke

Government
  - State electorate: Mildura
  - Federal division: Mallee

Population
  - Total: 32 (2016 census)
- Postcode: 3483
Localities around Kinnabulla
Beulah	Curyo	Marlbed
Beulah	Kinnabulla	Karyrie
Reedy Dam	Ballahpur	Karyrie

Kinnabulla is a locality located in the local government area of the Shire of Buloke, Victoria, Australia. The population of the locality is 173 people, 91 being male, and 82 being female. Kinnabulla Railway Station was a station on the Mildura railway line. The station closed to passenger and parcels traffic on 11 November 1975. The post office there opened in 1902 and was closed on 11 November 1973.
