= Narraport =

- Town
- Coordinates: 36°00′01″S 143°03′28″E
- Country: Australia
- State: Victoria
- LGA(s): Shire of Buloke
- Location: 263 km (163 mi) NW of Melbourne; 86 km (53 mi) SW of Swan Hill; 58 km (36 mi) SE of Sea Lake

Government
  - State electorate(s): Mildura
  - Federal division(s): Mallee

Population
  - Total(s): 50 (SAL 2021)
- Postcode: 3483
Localities around Narraport
Whirily	Whirily	Dumosa
Birchip	Narraport	Wycheproof
Morton Plains	Thalia	Wycheproof

Narraport is a locality in the Shire of Buloke, Victoria, Australia.

There is a rural CFA station in Narraport.

== History ==
The post office there opened on 1 February 1879 and was closed on 29 February 1968.

== Links ==
- 1952 - Tyrell FL Seniors & Reserves Premiership Photos; Narraport FC
