= Birchip =

- Town
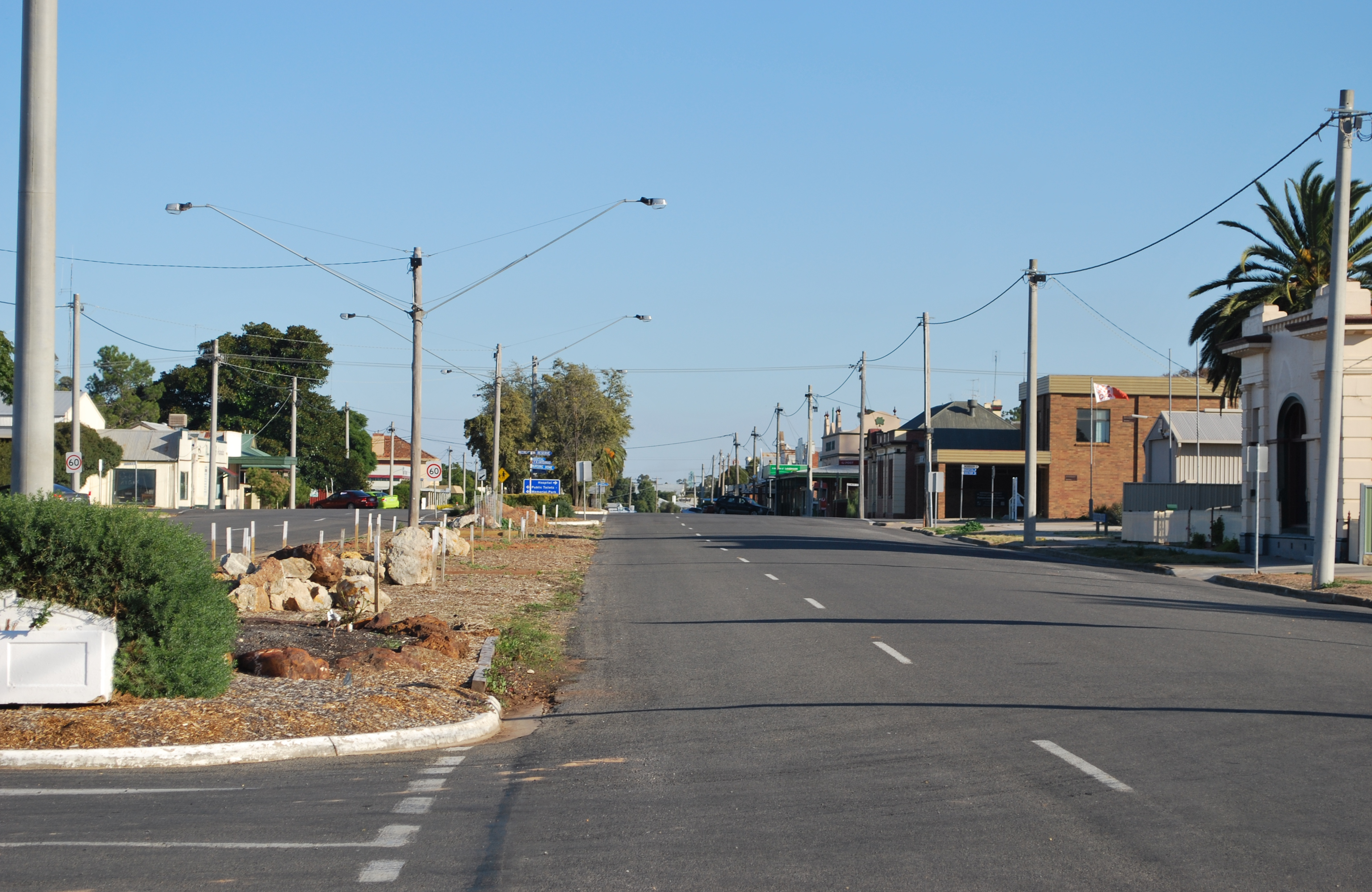
- The main street of Birchip

- Coordinates: 35°59′0″S 142°56′0″E
- Country: Australia
- State: Victoria
- LGA: Shire of Buloke
- Location: 312 km (194 mi) NW of Melbourne; 172 km (107 mi) NW of Bendigo; 137 km (85 mi) NE of Horsham; 116 km (72 mi) SW of Swan Hill; 65 km (40 mi) NW of Warracknabeal

Government
  - State electorate: Mildura
  - Federal division: Mallee
- Elevation: 102 m (335 ft)

Population
  - Total: 694 (2021 census)
- Postcode: 3483
- Mean max temp: 22.2 °C (72.0 °F)
- Mean min temp: 8.6 °C (47.5 °F)
- Annual rainfall: 374.1 mm (14.73 in)
Localities around Birchip
Karyrie	Whirily	Whirily
Karyrie	Birchip	Narraport
Birchip West	Morton Plains	Narraport

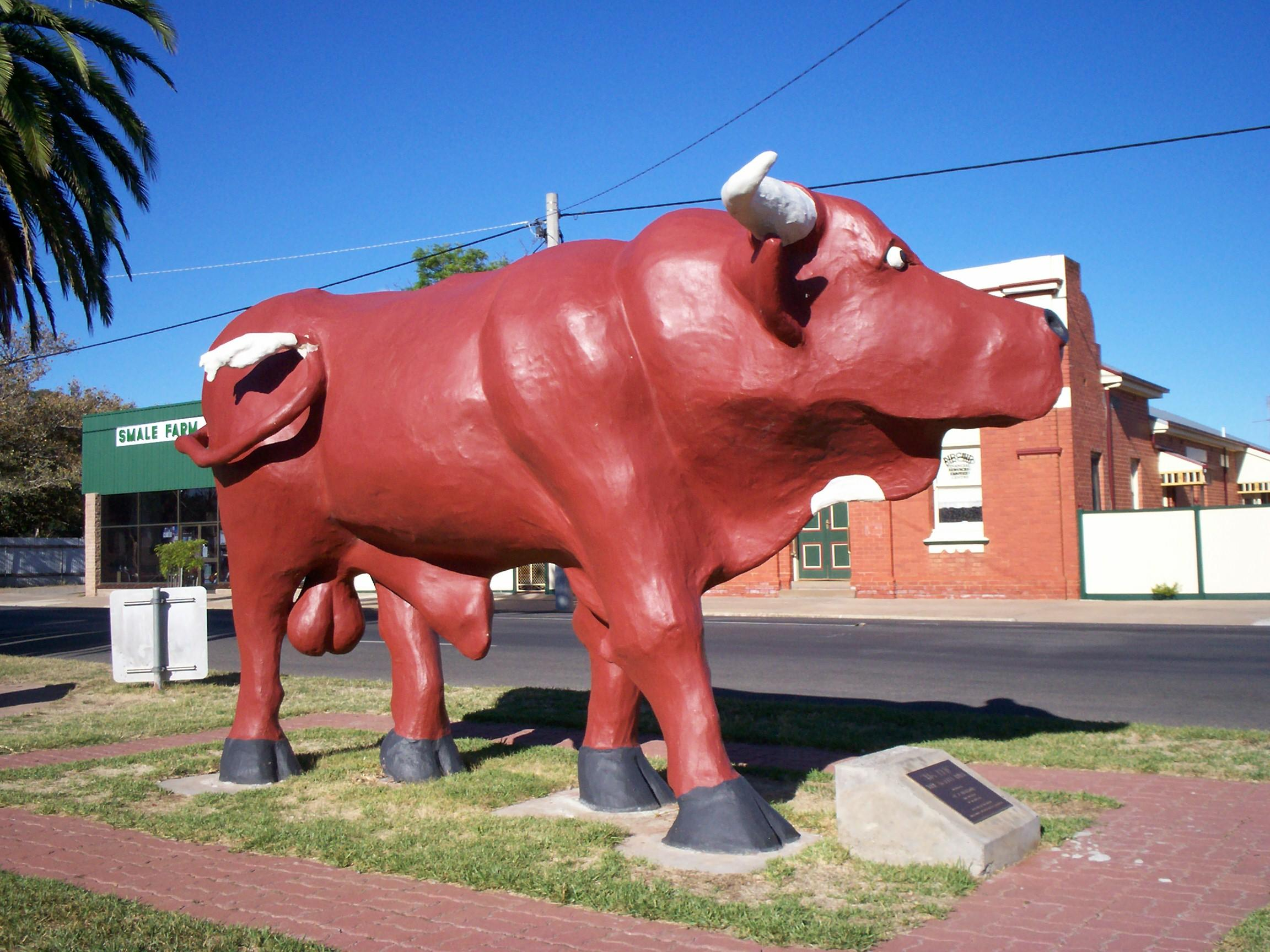
The "Mallee Bull"

Birchip is a town in the Mallee region of Victoria, Australia on the Sunraysia Highway north of Donald. The town is located in the Shire of Buloke local government area. At the 2021 census, Birchip had a population of 694, down from the 2016 figure of 702. It has a P-12 school, and an Australian rules football club called Birchip-Watchem, also known as the Birchip-Watchem Bulls, or just the "Bulls".

== History ==
A pastoral run was established in the region named Wirmburchep and when surveyed a parish was gazetted as Wirmbirchip.

Closer settlement began in the area by then known as around 1882 and a Post Office under that name opened on 2 July 1883 (Birchip from 1 January 1890). The town was surveyed as Birchip in 1887 though known by the inhabitants by the original name for quite some years later.

Birchip Magistrates' Court closed on 1 January 1983, though the court had not sat in Birchip since 1973.

== Birchip today ==
The farms in the area typically grow wheat, barley, canola, and other cereals. Some people have pig sheds, though most livestock in the district are sheep. There is a hospital which shares a lodge for elderly care.

Five main roads enter the town. It is located approximately 312 kilometres (194 mi) northwest of Victoria's capital city Melbourne. A road passes through Birchip that divides the Wimmera region of Victoria (to the south) from the Mallee region of Victoria (to the north). To travel to Birchip from Melbourne there are two preferred routes, one via the outskirts of Ballarat via the Sunraysia Highway and one around Bendigo via the Calder Highway. Each route's travel times are similar and the Ballarat route is more mountainous in some areas. There is an aerodrome for light aircraft.

With its neighbouring township Watchem Birchip has a football team (Birchip-Watchem) competing in the North Central Football League.

Golfers play at the Birchip Golf Club on Watson Street.

Most sport in Birchip is played at the Birchip Community Leisure Centre (BCLC). The BCLC is home to Australian rules football, netball, hockey, cricket, tennis, golf and squash.

Birchip was home to medical doctor and classical guitarist, Chath Silva, who was quoted to have attended Birchip P-12 school at some point in his early life.

Birchip is also home to Sharp's Bakery, known for its vanilla slice, which won awards at the Great Australian Vanilla Slice Triumph. The bakery has won this competition seven times since 2025.
