= List of places in Victoria named from pastoral runs =

This is a list of places in Victoria, Australia that retain the names of pastoral leases or runs that were granted from the late 1830s.

== Introduction ==
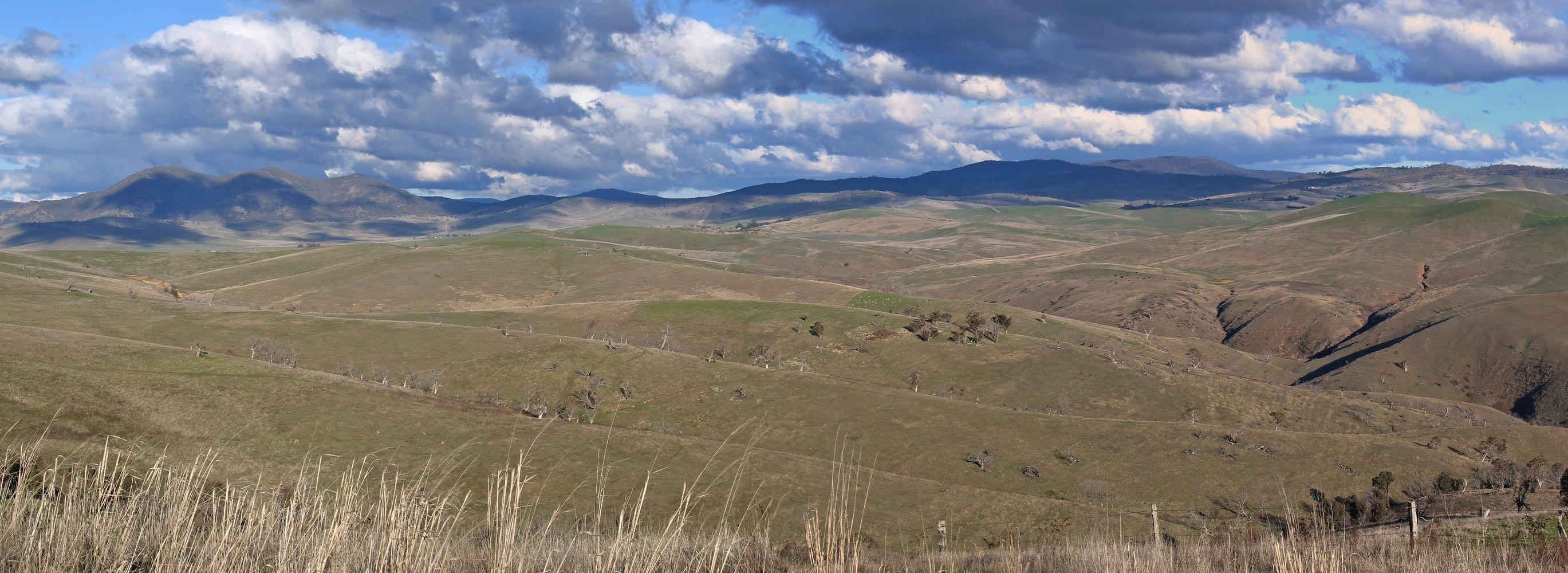
The Omeo Plains near Benambra from Mt Blowhard

The major reference for the leases is from 1866 when they were established throughout Victoria, and while many had been subdivided the original name was still extant. Eighteen pastoral districts existed at that time, the Settled Districts being generally a coastal strip from suburban Melbourne west to Portland where farming development was encouraged and Colony services were provided. The Swan Hill district included most of what is now The Mallee.

Leases bearing names of geographical features are mainly excluded as the name usually preceded the establishment of the run, for instance Mount Eccles or Fitzroy River.

Many localities listed are named from the parish in which they exist, the parish having been surveyed and gazetted later than the pastoral run and named from the run.County and Parish lists, Victoria 1910

Localities are bounded areas as recognised by the Victorian Registrar of Geographic Names acting under the Geographic Place Names Act (1998), although boundaries are the responsibility of each council. Detailed maps showing locality boundaries within a Local Government Area (LGA) are available on the State Government Victoria's, Department of Environment and Primary Industries (DEPI), Land and Survey Spatial Information (LASSI) interactive map website.

Placenames followed by an asterisk are unbounded areas within localities, defined as neighbourhoods.

== The list ==
Locality or place	Local government area	Run name	Pastoral district	Parish
Kotupna	Shire of Moira	Kotupna	Benalla	
Terrick Terrick East	Shire of Campaspe	Terrick Terrick Plains	Echuca	
Bungil	Shire of Towong	Bungil	Beechworth	
Genoa	Shire of East Gippsland	Genoa	North Gipps Land	
Benambra	Shire of East Gippsland	Benambra	Beechworth	
Marysville	Shire of Murrindindi	Maryville	South Gipps Land	
Gelantipy	Shire of East Gippsland	Gelantiby	Omeo	
Rodborough	Shire of Central Goldfields	Rodborough Vale	Castlemaine	
Tarcombe	Shire of Strathbogie	Tarcombe	Benalla	
St Germains	City of Greater Shepparton	St Germain's	Echuca	
Ghin Ghin	Shire of Murrindindi	Ghin Ghin	Benalla	
Birchip	Shire of Buloke	Wirmburchep	East Wimmera	Wirmbirchip
Cornella	Shire of Campaspe	Cornella Creek	Echuca	
Tongala	Shire of Campaspe	Tongala	Echuca	
Bangholme	City of Greater Dandenong	Bangholme	Settled Districts	
Yawong Hills	Shire of Buloke	Yawong or Springs	Castlemaine	
Kergunyah	Shire of Indigo	Kergunia	Beechworth	
Peechelba	Shire of Moira	Peechelba	Benalla	
Windermere	City of Ballarat	Windermere	Castlemaine	
Cobungra	Shire of East Gippsland	Cobungra	Omeo	
Kimbolton	City of Greater Bendigo	Kimbolton	Gisborne	
Kamarooka	Shire of Loddon	Kamarooka	Echuca	
Yabba *	Shire of Towong	Yabba	Beechworth	
Arcadia	City of Greater Shepparton	Arcadia	Benalla	
Moondarra	Shire of Baw Baw	Moondarra	South Gipps Land	
Tarrone	Shire of Moyne	Tarrone	Warrnambool	
Sandmount*	Shire of Moira	Sand Mount	Swan Hill	
Sunset*	Rural City of Mildura	Sunset	Swan Hill	
Prairie	Shire of Loddon	Prairie (or Terrick Terrick East)	Echuca	
Omeo	Shire of East Gippsland	Omeo	Omeo	
Tootgarook	Shire of Mornington Peninsula	Tootgarook	Melbourne	
Lawler	Shire of Buloke	Lawler	East Wimmera	
Glenmore	Shire of Moorabool	Glenmore	Benalla	
Wonwondah	Rural City of Horsham	Wonwondah	West Wimmera	
Wahgunyah	Shire of Indigo	Wahgunyah	Beechworth	
Baynton	Shire of Macedon Ranges	Darlington owner: Thomas Baynton	Gisborne	

== See also ==
- List of localities in Victoria
- History of Victoria
