= Wycheproof South =

- Town
- Coordinates: 36°08′03″S 143°11′22″E
- Country: Australia
- State: Victoria
- LGA: Shire of Buloke
- Location: 244 km (152 mi) NW of Melbourne; 119 km (74 mi) NW of Bendigo; 7 km (4.3 mi) SW of Wycheproof

Government
  - State electorate: Mildura
  - Federal division: Mallee

Population
  - Total: 6 (SAL 2021)
- Postcode: 3527
Localities around Wycheproof South
Thalia	Wycheproof	Wycheproof
Chirrip	Wycheproof South	Wycheproof
Chirrip	Teddywaddy West	Teddywaddy West

Wycheproof South is a locality in the local government area of the Shire of Buloke, Victoria, Australia.
