= Jil Jil =

- Town
- Coordinates: 35°49′56″S 142°59′34″E
- Country: Australia
- State: Victoria
- LGA: Shire of Buloke

Government
  - State electorate: Mildura
  - Federal division: Mallee

Population
  - Total: 17 (2021 census)
- Postcode: 3483
Localities around Jil Jil
| Willangie | Sutton | Culgoa |
| Marlbed | Jil Jil | Warne |
| Marlbed | Whirily | Nullawil |

Jil Jil is a locality in the local government area of the Shire of Buloke, Victoria, Australia. The post office opened as Reseigh on 25 November 1924 and was closed on 1 March 1929.

== See also ==
- List of reduplicated Australian place names
