= Berriwillock =

- Town
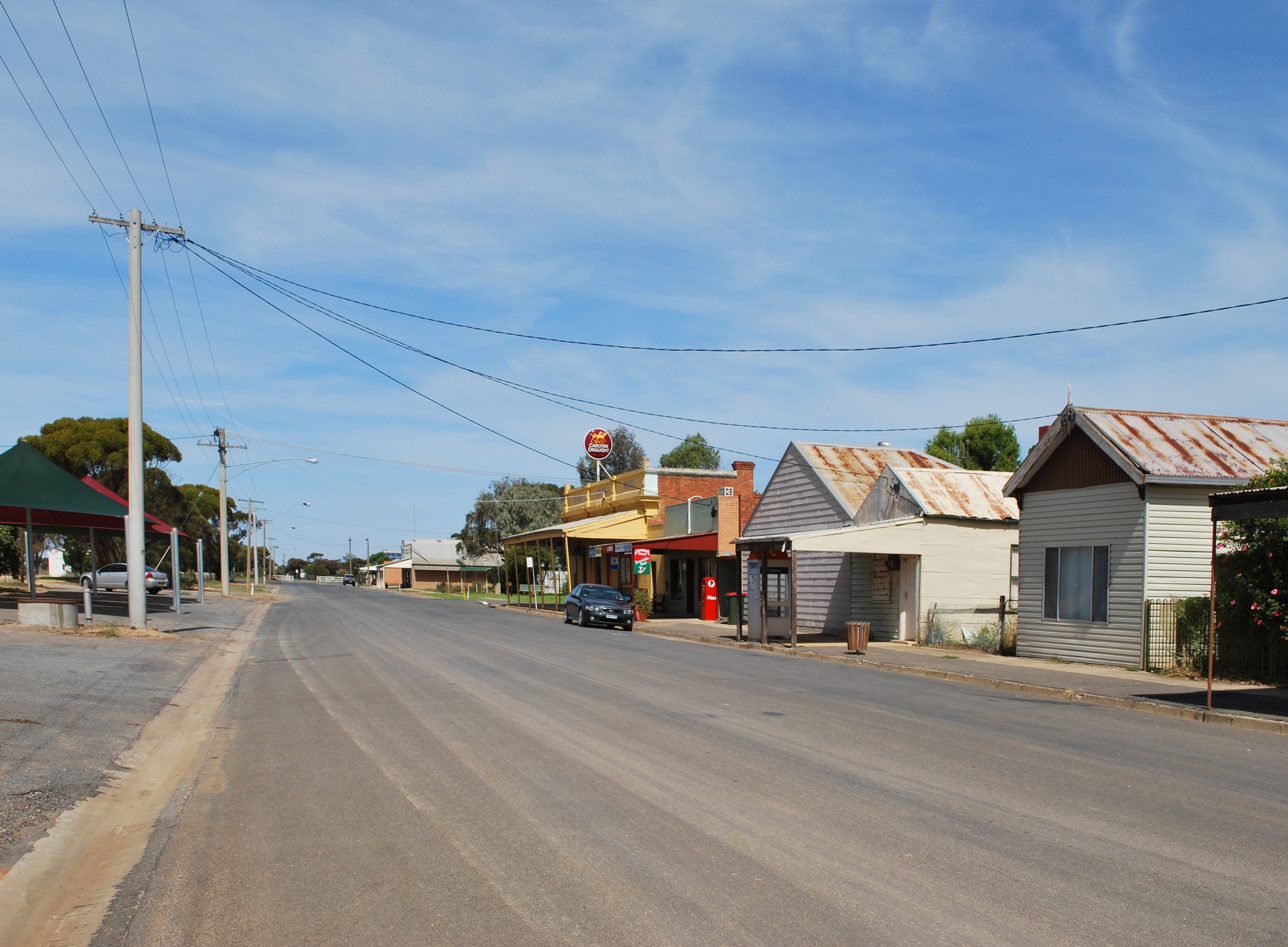
- Taverner Street, the main street of Berriwillock

- Coordinates: 35°38′0″S 143°00′0″E
- Country: Australia
- State: Victoria
- LGA: Shire of Buloke
- Location: 11 km (6.8 mi) from Boigbeat; 13 km (8.1 mi) from Culgoa; 77 km (48 mi) from Swan Hill; 332 km (206 mi) from Melbourne
- Elevation: 83 m (272 ft)

Population
  - Total: 180 (2021 census)
- Postcode: 3531
Localities around Berriwillock
Banyan	Boigbeat	Springfield
Banyan	Berriwillock	Springfield
Willangie	Sutton	Culgoa

Berriwillock is a town in the Mallee region in the north-west of the Australian state of Victoria. Berriwillock is 332 kilometres (206 mi) north-west of the state capital, Melbourne. Nearby towns include Boigbeat (about 11 kilometres (6.8 mi) north west and Culgoa 11 kilometres (6.8 mi) south east.

Berriwillock is 80 kilometres (50 mi) due west of the Murray River and is a vibrant grain producing community.

== Transport ==
Berriwillock is adjacent to the Calder Highway, 334 kilometres (208 mi) northwest of Melbourne. It was formerly served by the Berriwillock railway station on the Kulwin railway line. The line has not carried passenger services since 1977, but is still available for freight (bulk grain), and there are bulk grain silos at the station.

Berriwillock Post Office opened on 16 April 1894 shortly after the arrival of the railway.

== Berriwillock wheat scheme ==
Berriwillock is the home of a charitable scheme where the local farmers grow wheat for charity. In drought years, it may not make a profit to donate, but most years the scheme provides grants to a range of charitable causes. It has been running since 1953. In response to a discussion with the Presbyterian minister, one farmer committed 60 hectares (150 acres) of land and many others contributed the seed, labour and equipment to plant and harvest the land. As technology has improved, what was once a day's work for 30 farmers and a picnic for their families is now only a few hours for one machine. The proceeds are split 50:50 between Australian and international causes. The proceeds of the first year went to underfed people in Europe and Asia, and to the Melbourne Hospital.

== Sport ==
Golfers play at the Berriwillock Golf Club.

The town is part of the Sea Lake Nandaly Football Club and until 2015 had a game played in Berriwillock every year.
