= Boneo =

- Town
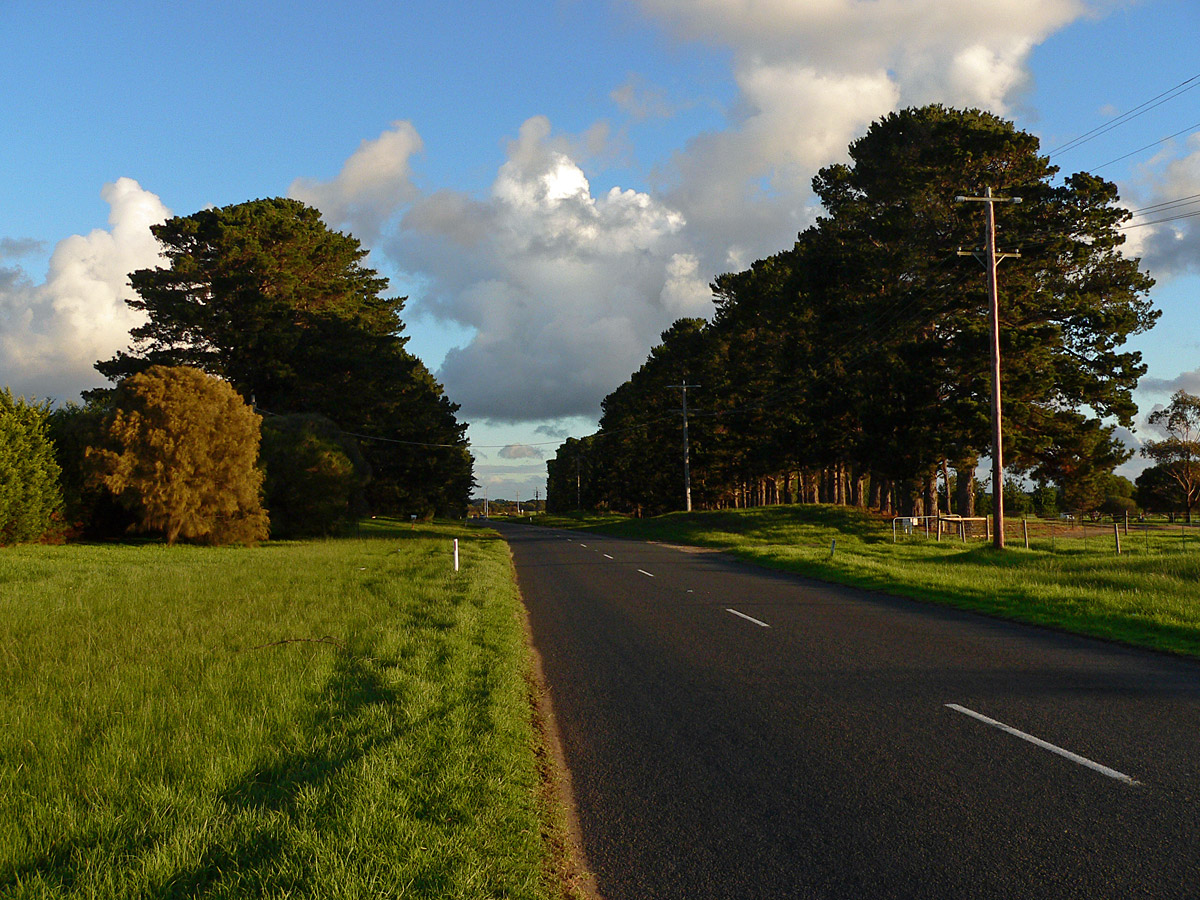
- Old Cape Schanck Road

- Interactive map of Boneo
- Coordinates: 38.413°S 144.888°E
- Country: Australia
- State: Victoria
- LGA: Shire of Mornington Peninsula
- Location: 88 km (55 mi) from Melbourne; 9 km (5.6 mi) from Rosebud

Government
  - State electorate: Nepean
  - Federal division: Flinders

Population
  - Total: 314 (2021 census)
- Postcode: 3939
Localities around Boneo
Rosebud West	Rosebud	Main Ridge
Fingal	Boneo	Flinders
Cape Schanck		Flinders

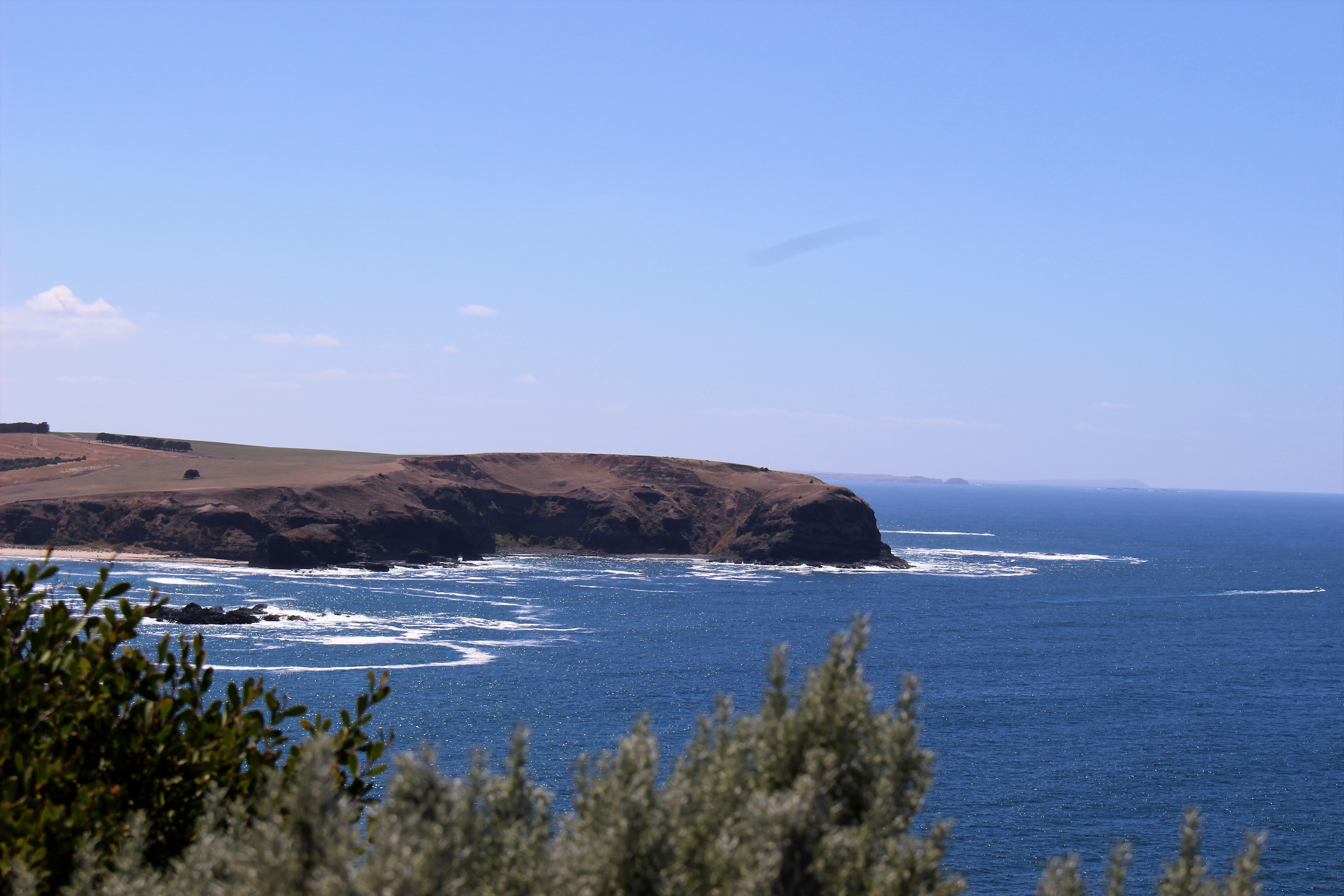
Boneo view

Boneo is a locality on the Mornington Peninsula in Melbourne, Victoria, Australia, approximately 65 km (40 mi) south of Melbourne's Central Business District, located within the Shire of Mornington Peninsula local government area. Boneo recorded a population of 314 at the 2021 census.

Boneo is located south of and inland from Rosebud.

== History ==
Boneo Post Office first opened on 1 July 1874 and closed in 1877. It reopened in 1902 and apart for a short recess was open until 1951.

== Today ==
It is dominated by the Boneo Flats, where market gardens and pastures are located. It contains a recreation reserve, community hall and primary school. A market also operates on the third Saturday of every month.

The eastern part of the locality, alongside Main Creek, is part of the Mornington Peninsula National Park called Greens Bush, a native bushland area first set aside for conservation in 1974 and supporting the largest population of eastern grey kangaroos on the Mornington Peninsula. Several walking tracks provide access to the area.

== See also ==
- Shire of Flinders – Boneo was previously within this former local government area.
