= Myall, Victoria (Shire of Buloke) =

Myall
- Town
- Coordinates: 35°31′59″S 142°44′58″E
- Country: Australia
- State: Victoria
- LGA: Shire of Buloke

Government
  - State electorate: Mildura
  - Federal division: Mallee

Population
  - Total: 17 (SAL 2021)
- Postcode: 3533
Localities around Myall
Lascelles	Ninda	Sea Lake
Lascelles	Myall	Sea Lake
Woomelang	Banyan	Banyan

Myall is a locality in the local government area of the Shire of Buloke, Victoria, Australia. It had a post office that was opened on 24 March 1891, then it was closed on 20 June 1965.
