= Wycheproof =

- Town
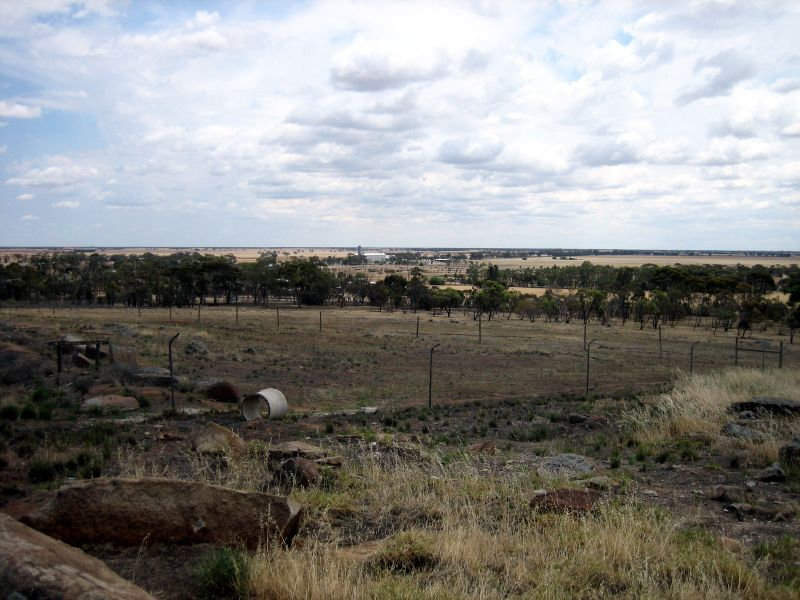
- View from the Mount Wycheproof Lookout

- Coordinates: 36°05′0″S 143°13′0″E
- Country: Australia
- State: Victoria
- LGA: Shire of Buloke
- Location: 276 km (171 mi) NW of Melbourne; 136 km (85 mi) NW of Bendigo; 96 km (60 mi) S of Swan Hill; 31 km (19 mi) NW of Charlton

Government
  - State electorate: Mildura
  - Federal division: Mallee
- Elevation: 113 m (371 ft)

Population
  - Total: 610 (2021 census)
- Postcode: 3527
Localities around Wycheproof
Narraport	Dumosa	Towaninny South
Thalia	Wycheproof	Bunguluke
Wycheproof South	Teddywaddy West, Teddywaddy	Glenloth

Wycheproof /ˈwɪtʃɪpruːf/ is a town in the centre of the Shire of Buloke, in north western Victoria, Australia. As of the 2021 census, it had a population of 610.

== History ==
The name "Wycheproof" originates from an Aboriginal word meaning 'grass on a hill', referring to Mount Wycheproof just off the Calder Highway, which is the smallest registered mountain in the world, standing at 148 metres (486 ft) above sea level or 43 metres (141 ft) above the surrounding plains. The economy of Wycheproof is driven mainly by wheat.

The railway from Bendigo and Korong Vale reached the area in 1883 and was later extended north. The township was established beside the railway and the Post Office opened on 1 April 1884 replacing earlier offices from 1876 serving the rural area named Wycheproof (renamed to Moffat) and Mount Wycheproof. The last regular passenger service though the local railway station was from Bendigo to Sea Lake on 7 May 1977 and was operated by a Diesel Electric railmotor. The town is unusual in that even today the railway line runs along the centre of the main street.

The Wycheproof Magistrates' Court, based in the historic Wycheproof Court House, closed on 1 January 1983.

In an attempt to attract new residents, in 2009 the local community developed a project to offer otherwise vacant farmhouses for rent at A$1 per week. Expressions of interest in the scheme have been heard from Brazil, Argentina, Spain, Austria, Switzerland, Germany, and Ireland as well as most parts of Australia. The project was inspired by a similar program at Cumnock, New South Wales.

== Sport ==
Wycheproof has a proud sporting history. With its neighbouring township Narraport, Wycheproof had an Australian rules football team (Wycheproof-Narraport) competing in the North Central Football League. AFL players from Wycheproof include Corey Jones, Mervyn Keane, Greg Kennedy and Chris Pym.

Wycheproof has a horse racing club, the Mt Wycheproof & District Racing Club, whose one meeting a year is the Mount Wycheproof Cup meeting held on Victoria Derby day in late October or early November.

Golfers play at the course of the Wycheproof Golf Club on the Calder Highway.

== Notable people ==
- Wycheproof is the birthplace of Peta Credlin, who was Chief of Staff for Tony Abbott while he was the Prime Minister of Australia, and leader of the Liberal Party of Australia.
- VFL footballer Greg Kennedy is from the Wycheproof district, and was recruited by Carlton via Eaglehawk Football Club.

== Climate ==
Climate data for Wycheproof, elevation 110 m (360 ft)
Month	Jan	Feb	Mar	Apr	May	Jun	Jul	Aug	Sep	Oct	Nov	Dec	Year
Mean daily maximum °C (°F)	30.5 (86.9)	30.8 (87.4)	27.2 (81.0)	22.4 (72.3)	17.6 (63.7)	13.8 (56.8)	13.5 (56.3)	15.2 (59.4)	18.0 (64.4)	21.9 (71.4)	26.4 (79.5)	29.3 (84.7)	22.2 (72.0)
Mean daily minimum °C (°F)	13.4 (56.1)	13.9 (57.0)	11.7 (53.1)	8.4 (47.1)	5.8 (42.4)	3.4 (38.1)	3.1 (37.6)	3.8 (38.8)	4.7 (40.5)	7.1 (44.8)	9.8 (49.6)	12.0 (53.6)	8.1 (46.6)
Average rainfall mm (inches)	23.3 (0.92)	23.4 (0.92)	23.0 (0.91)	28.1 (1.11)	36.5 (1.44)	38.8 (1.53)	36.1 (1.42)	38.2 (1.50)	37.6 (1.48)	38.1 (1.50)	30.3 (1.19)	25.3 (1.00)	378.2 (14.89)
Average rainy days (≥ 1.0 mm)	2.6	2.4	2.7	3.9	5.6	6.8	7.3	7.3	6.4	5.6	4.0	3.3	57.9
Source: Bureau of Meteorology

== Gallery ==
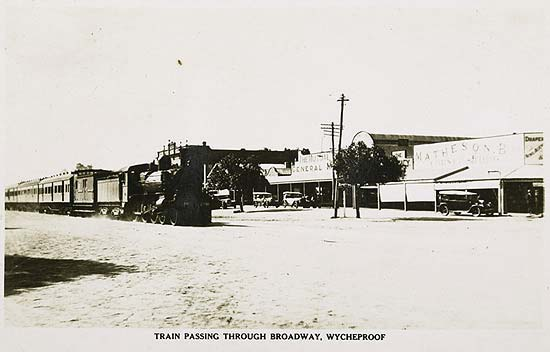
Train headed down the main street of Broadway

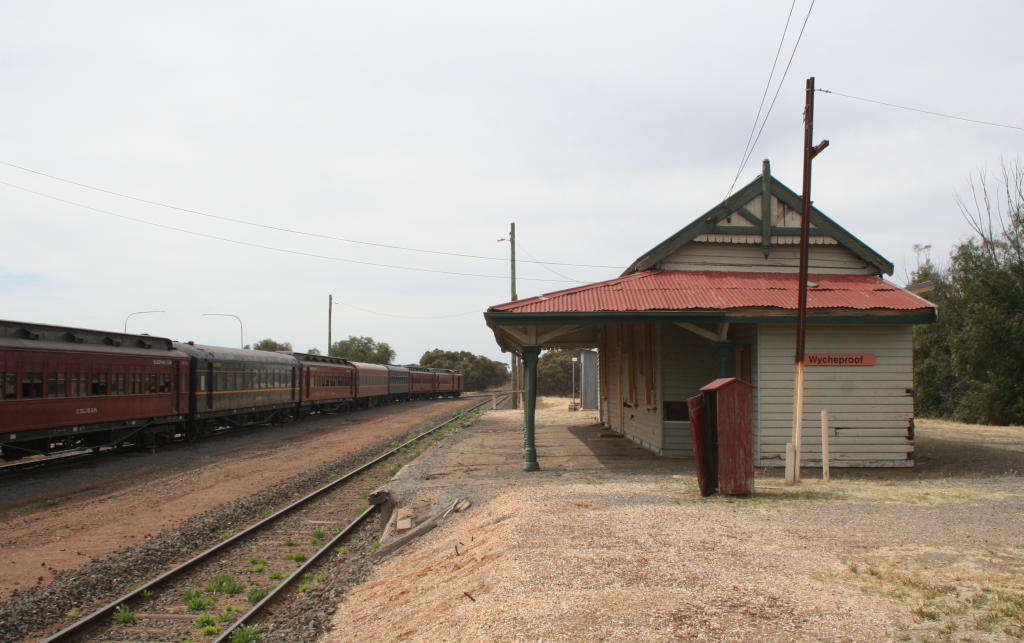
Remains of the railway station, prior to its restoration
