= List of places of worship in West Wimmera Shire =

This is a list of places of worship in the Shire of West Wimmera, a local government area in the state of Victoria, Australia. The list includes active and former churches and other religious buildings representing a variety of Christian denominations and other faiths.

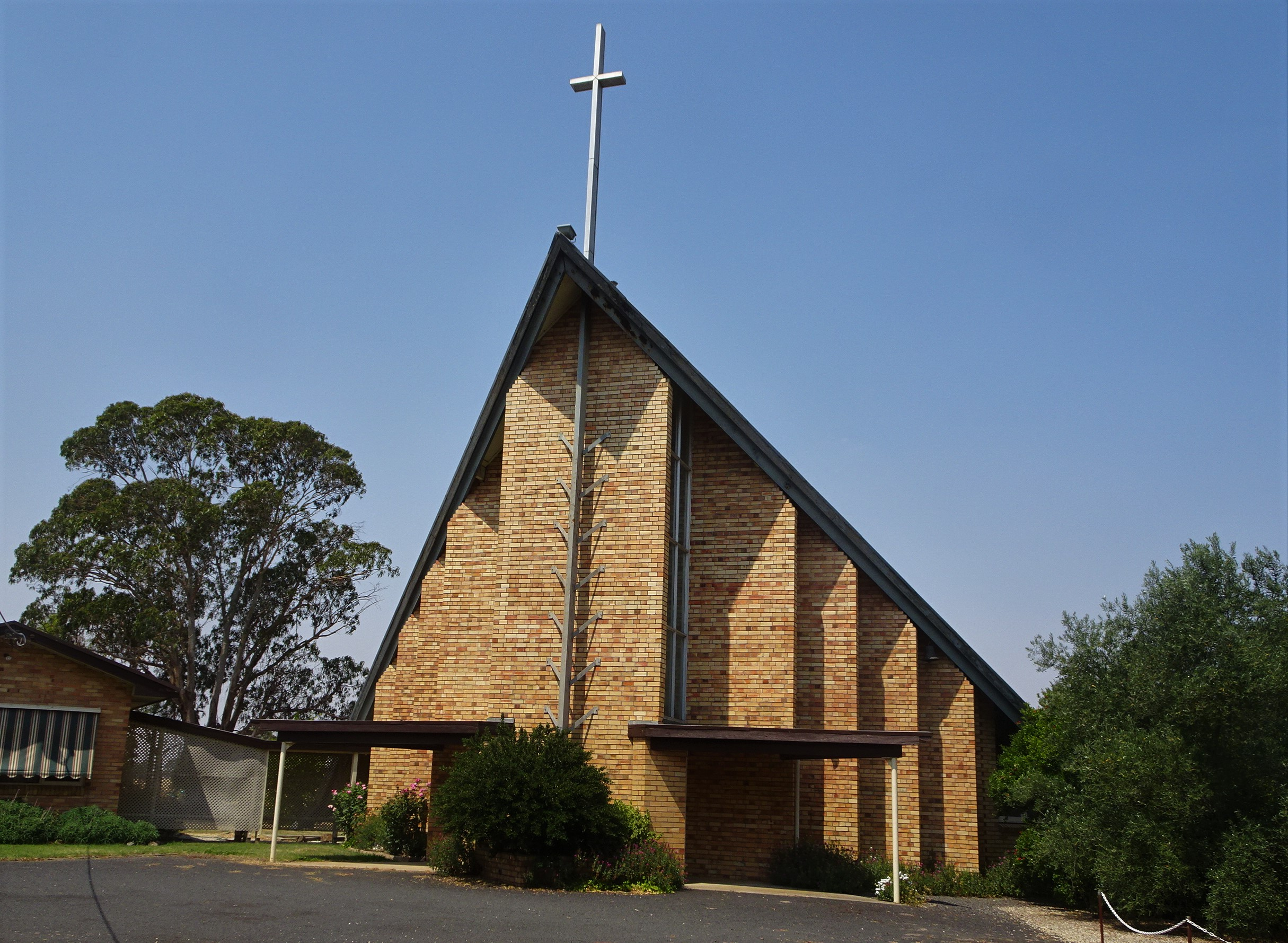
All Souls' Anglican Church, Edenhope

== Heritage listing status ==
Style	Status
Yes	Listed on the Victorian Heritage Register
–	Not listed

== Current places of worship ==
Current places of worship
Name	Image	Location	Denomination/ Affiliation	Heritage listing	Notes	Refs
St Malachy's Catholic Church		Edenhope; 37.035814°S 141.295649°E	Catholic	–		
St Mark's Uniting Church		Edenhope; 37.036072°S 141.298285°E	Uniting (formerly Presbyterian)	–		
Immanuel Lutheran Church		Edenhope; 37.036790°S 141.294549°E	Lutheran (formerly Anglican)	–		
All Souls' Anglican Church		Edenhope; 37.032572°S 141.302108°E	Anglican	–		
Goroke Uniting Church		Goroke; 36.719344°S 141.475025°E	Uniting (formerly Methodist (Wesleyan))	–		
Goroke Lutheran Church (St Peter's Lutheran Church, Goroke)		Goroke; 36.719325°S 141.473383°E	Lutheran	–		
St Paul's Anglican Church, Harrow		Harrow; 37.164351°S 141.592825°E	Anglican	–		
Freedom to Worship Christian Church (formerly Kaniva Citadel (Kaniva Corps))		Kaniva; 36.377952°S 141.242338°E	Non-denominational (formerly Salvation Army)	–		
Kaniva Church of Christ		Kaniva; 36.379584°S 141.243135°E	Church of Christ	–		
St Augustine's Anglican Church		Kaniva; 36.379306°S 141.241204°E	Anglican	–		
St John's Presbyterian Church (Kaniva Presbyterian Church)		Kaniva; 36.379956°S 141.239616°E	Presbyterian	–		
Kaniva Uniting Church		Kaniva; 36.378209°S 141.240868°E	Uniting (formerly Methodist)	–		
Serviceton Uniting Church		Serviceton; 36.376799°S 140.988526°E	Uniting (formerly Methodist)	–		
Serviceton Church of Christ		Serviceton; 36.377882°S 140.988498°E	Church of Christ	–		
Apsley Uniting Church		Apsley; 36.965218°S 141.087040°E	Uniting	–		

== Former places of worship ==
Former places of worship
Name	Image	Location	Denomination/ Affiliation	Heritage listing	Notes	Refs
Dergholm Presbyterian Church		Dergholm; 37.370256°S 141.215573°E	Presbyterian	–		
Goroke Presbyterian Church		Goroke; 36.718832°S 141.472752°E	Presbyterian	Non-existent		
St Michael's Catholic Church		Goroke; 36.719076°S 141.474222°E	Catholic	Non-existent		
St Michael's Catholic Church, Kaniva		Kaniva; 36.380713°S 141.246514°E	Catholic	–		
St Phillip's Anglican Church		Goroke; 36.718916°S 141.474656°E	Anglican	–		
Harrow Uniting Church		Harrow; 37.163777°S 141.593681°E	Uniting (formerly Presbyterian)	Yes		
Karnak Methodist Church		Karnak; 36.823610°S 141.483271°E	Methodist	Non-existent		
Immaculate Conception Catholic Church		Apsley; 36.967395°S 141.083891°E	Catholic	–		
St John's Anglican Church, Apsley		Apsley; 36.967658°S 141.081689°E	Anglican	–		

== See also ==
- List of places of worship in the Rural City of Swan Hill
- List of places of worship in Golden Plains Shire
- List of places of worship in Southern Grampians Shire
- List of places of worship in the City of Greater Geelong
