= A. ellipticus =

A. ellipticus may refer to:

- Abacetus ellipticus, a ground beetle
- Adenanthos ellipticus, a plant found in Western Australia
- Armadilloniscus ellipticus, a woodlouse
- Aspergillus ellipticus, a fungus
