= Nurcoung =

- Town
- Coordinates: 36°44′0″S 141°42′0″E
- Country: Australia
- State: Victoria
- LGA: Shire of West Wimmera
- Location: 41 km (25 mi) from

Government
  - State electorate: Lowan
  - Federal division: Mallee

Population
  - Total: 40 (2016)
- Postcode: 3401

Nurcoung is a locality in Victoria, Australia. It is located in the Shire of West Wimmera local government area. At the 2016 census, Nurcoung recorded a population of 40.

== Nurcoung State School ==
Nurcoung State School was a state school located in the Parish of Nurcoung. The school officially opened on 11 September 1886 to serve the educational needs of children belonging to the new selectors on Spring Hill Station. The surveyed site of the school was in the centre of the Parish of Nurcoung being approximately 37 miles west of Horsham and 12 miles northwest of Mount Arapiles.

According to an official record, the first head teacher was Miss M. Manckton. Before the Nurcoung State School was built, the teachers and students used an old farmhouse of Thomas Sheriff. The school obtained desks from a closed school at Booroopki, west of Goroke. When the Nurcoung school closed down, the building was taken to Goroke P-12 College to be used as a classroom.
