= List of places on the Victorian Heritage Register in the Shire of West Wimmera =

This is a list of places on the Victorian Heritage Register in the Shire of West Wimmera in Victoria, Australia. The Victorian Heritage Register is maintained by the Heritage Council of Victoria.

The Victorian Heritage Register, as of 2021, lists the following four state-registered places within the Shire of West Wimmera:

Place name	Place #	Location	Suburb or Town	Co-ordinates	Built	State registered	Photo
Former Log Lock-Up	H0306	2-6 Blair Street	Harrow	37.163450°S 141.593770°E	1859	9 October 1974	
Kaniva railway station	H1569	Moore Street	Kaniva	36.376970°S 141.242210°E	1887	20 August 1982	
Kout Norien Estate	H0307	47 Harrow-Clear Lake Road	Harrow	37.145560°S 141.624200°E	1848	9 October 1974	
Serviceton railway station	H1592	Elizabeth Street	Serviceton	36.375650°S 140.988520°E	1888	20 August 1982	
