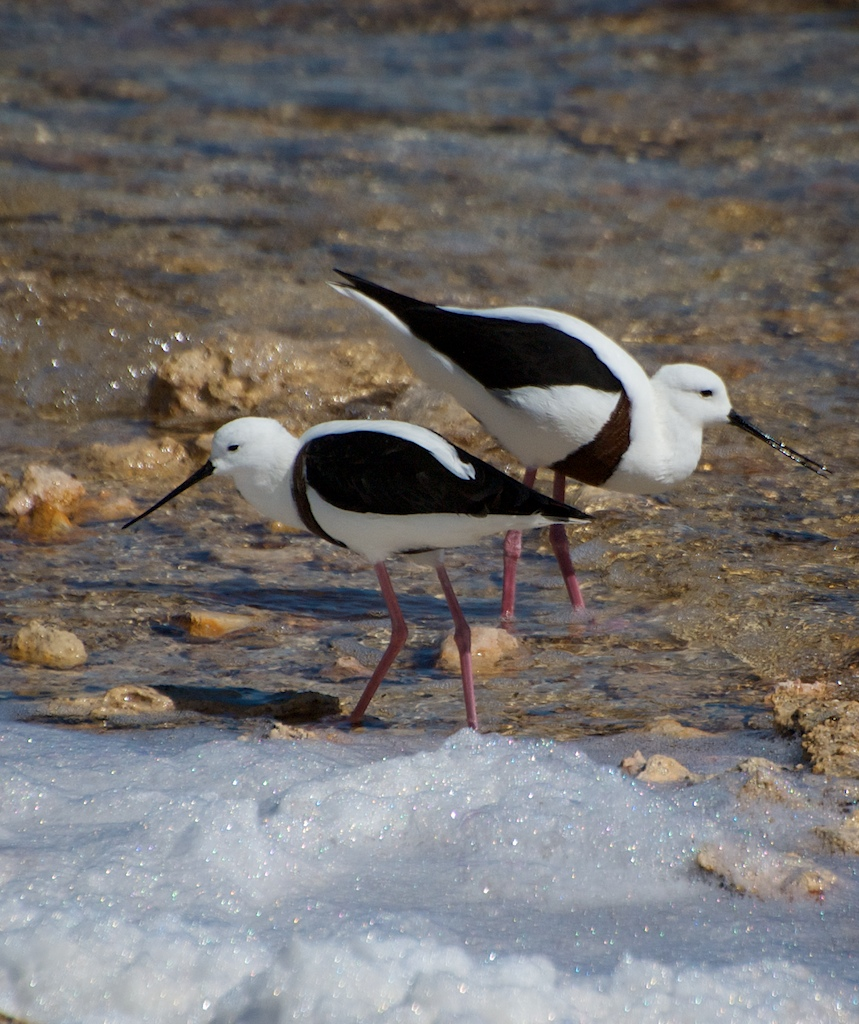
- Banded stilts, Rottnest Island

Conservation status
- Least Concern (IUCN 3.1)

Scientific classification
- Kingdom: Animalia
- Phylum: Chordata
- Class: Aves
- Order: Charadriiformes
- Family: Recurvirostridae
- Genus: Cladorhynchus; G.R. Gray, 1840
- Species: C. leucocephalus

Binomial name
- Cladorhynchus leucocephalus (Vieillot, 1816)
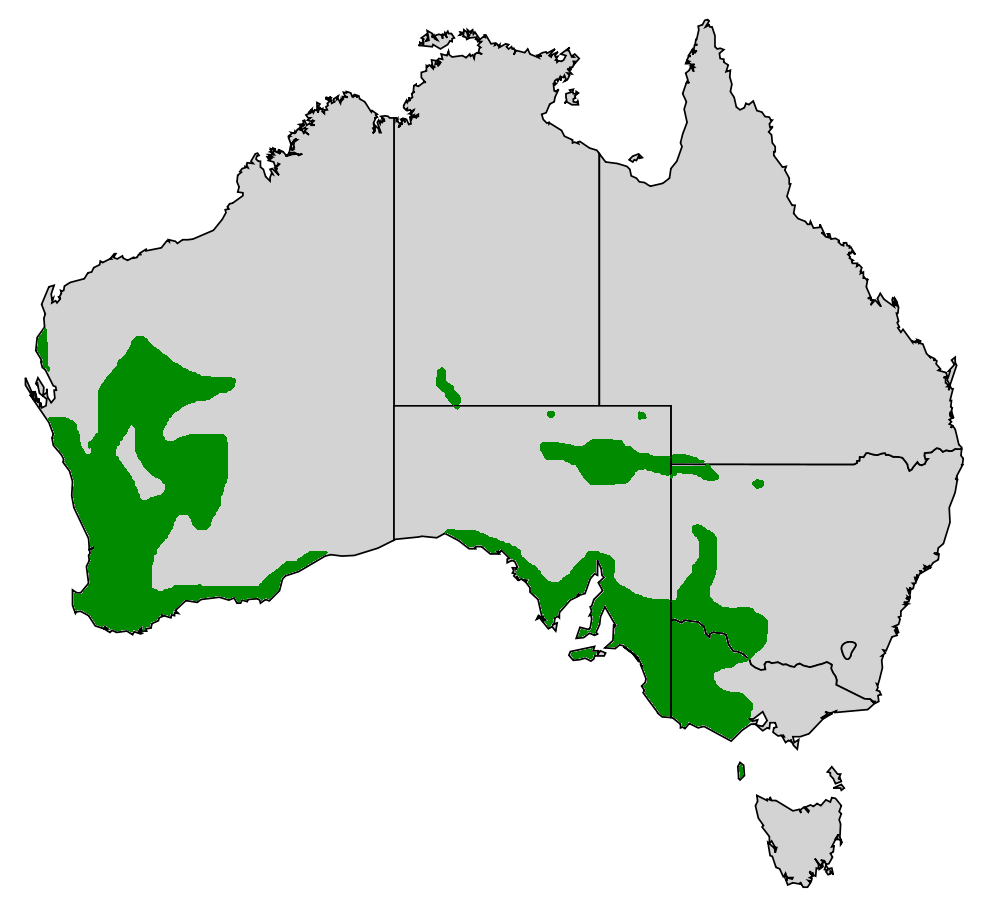
- Banded stilt natural range

Synonyms
- Recurvirostra leucocephala Vieillot; Recurvirostra orientalis Cuvier, 1816; Leptorhynchus pectoralis Du Bus de Gisignies, 1835; Himantopus palmatus Gould; Cladorhynchus australis Lawson; Cladorhynchus leucocephalus rottnesti Mathews; Xiphidiorhynchus pectoralis Ludwig Reichenbach, 1845

= Banded stilt =

Species of Australian bird in the family Recurvirostridae

The banded stilt (Cladorhynchus leucocephalus) is a wader of the stilt and avocet family, Recurvirostridae, native to Australia. It belongs to the monotypic genus Cladorhynchus. It gets its name from the red-brown breast band found on breeding adults, though this is mottled or entirely absent in non-breeding adults and juveniles. Its remaining plumage is pied and the eyes are dark brown. Nestling banded stilts have white down, unlike any other species of wader.

Breeding is triggered by the filling of inland salt lakes by rainfall, creating large shallow lakes rich in tiny shrimp on which the birds feed. A nomadic species, banded stilts migrate to these lakes in large numbers and assemble in large breeding colonies. The female lays three to four brown- or black-splotched whitish eggs on a scrape. If conditions are favourable, a second brood might be laid, though if the lakes dry up prematurely the breeding colonies may be abandoned.

The banded stilt is considered to be a species of least concern by the International Union for Conservation of Nature (IUCN). Under the South Australian National Parks and Wildlife Act 1972, however, this bird is considered to be Vulnerable. This is due to the predation of it by silver gulls, which are considered to be a serious threat. Black falcons and wedge-tailed eagles are also predators, taking the banded stilt and its young.

== Taxonomy ==
French ornithologist Louis Pierre Vieillot described the banded stilt in 1816, classifying it in the avocet genus Recurvirostra and giving it the name Recurvirostra leucocephala, "L'avocette a tete blanche" ("white-headed avocet"). He only recorded the species as being found in terres australes, the meaning of which is unclear. Amateur ornithologist Gregory Mathews interpreted this as Victoria, while Erwin Stresemann concluded this was Rottnest Island in Western Australia. The species name is derived from the Ancient Greek words leukos "white", and kephale "head". French naturalist Georges Cuvier described it as Recurvirostra orientalis the same year. Belgian ornithologist Bernard du Bus de Gisignies described it as a new genus and species, Leptorhynchus pectoralis, to the Royal Academy of Belgium in 1835.

English zoologist George Robert Gray placed the banded stilt in its own genus Cladorhynchus in 1840, noting that the name Leptorhynchus had been previously used. The genus name is from the Ancient Greek klados "twig" and rhynchos "bill". Likewise, German naturalist Johannes Gistel proposed the name Timeta to replace Leptorhynchus in 1848. John Gould had described the banded stilt as Himantopus palmatus in 1837, but recorded it as Cladorhynchus pectoralis in his 1865 work Handbook to the Birds of Australia. Gould also wrote that its distribution was unclear after it was first recorded at Rottnest Island though not elsewhere in Western Australia, and later in South Australia, until large numbers were seen by the British explorer Charles Sturt at Lepson's Lake north of Cooper Creek in what is now western Queensland. German naturalist Ludwig Reichenbach placed it in a new genus, naming it Xiphidiorhynchus pectoralis in 1845. Australian ornithologist Fred Lawson gave it the name Cladorhynchus australis in 1904. Gregory Mathews in his 1913 List of the Birds of Australia synonymised all subsequent genus and species names, using Cladorhynchus australis. He listed his subspecies rottnesti from 1913, though this has not been recognised since. Both Joseph G. Strauch in a 1978 study and Philip C. Chu in a 1995 re-analysis of bone and muscle characters found that the banded stilt was sister taxon to the avocets, with the stilts of the genus Himantopus an earlier offshoot. A 2004 study combining genetics and morphology reinforced its position as sister to the avocet lineage.

English naturalist John Latham gave the bird the name "oriental avocet" in 1824, after Cuvier's description. "Banded stilt" has been designated the official name by the International Ornithological Committee (IOC). Other common names include "Rottnest snipe" and "bishop snipe". The Ngarrindjeri people of the Lower Murray River region in South Australia knew it as nilkani.

== Description ==
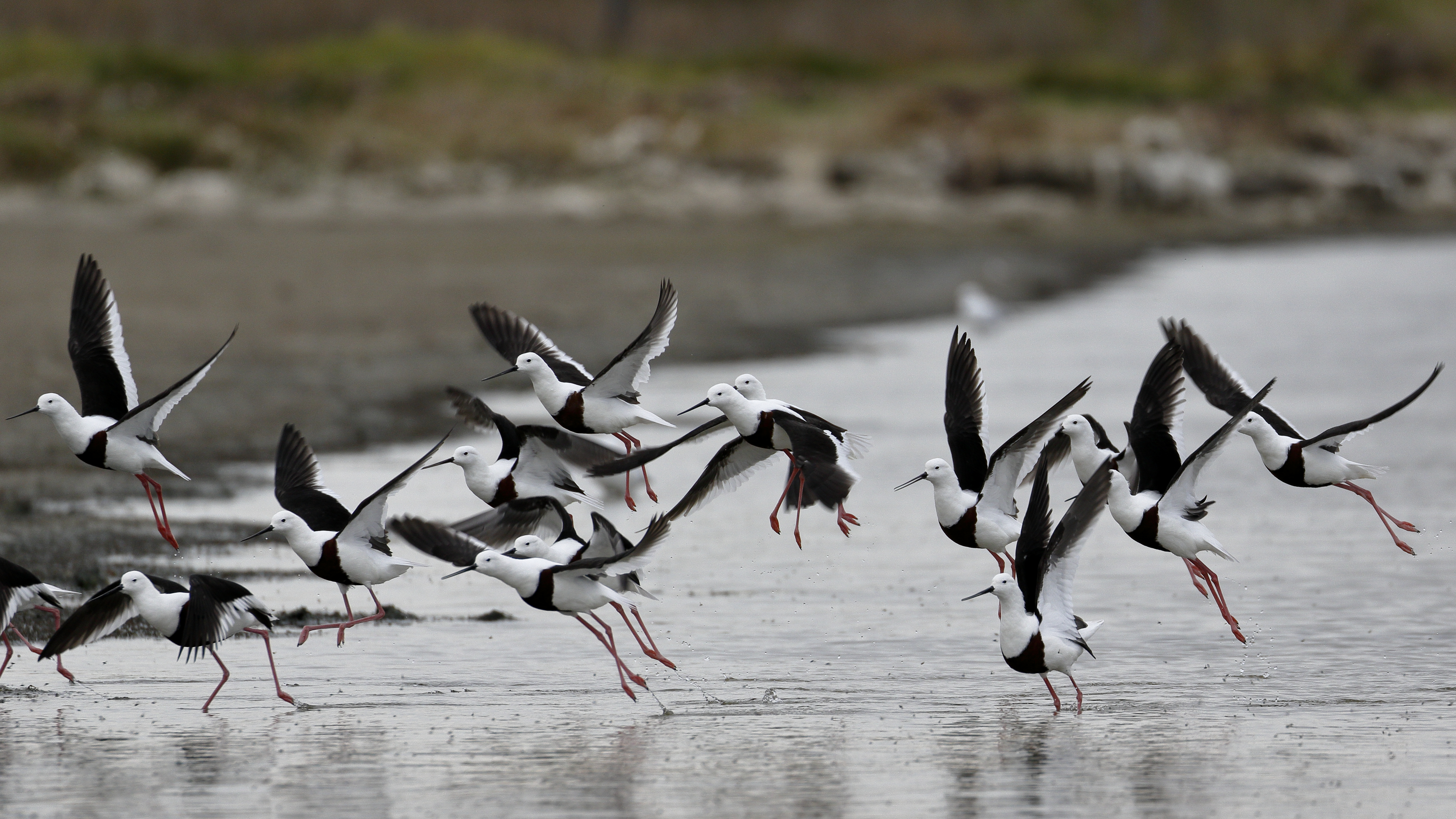
Taking off, Port Fairy

The banded stilt is 35–43 cm (14–17 in) long and weighs 220–260 g (7.8–9.2 oz), with a wingspan of 55–68 cm (22–27 in). Adults in breeding plumage are predominantly white with black wings and a broad well-demarcated u-shaped chestnut band across the breast. The central part of the base of the upper tail is tinted a pale grey-brown. The slender bill is black, relatively straight, and twice as long as the head. The irises are dark brown and the legs and feet are a dark red-pink. The wings are long and slim and have eleven primary flight feathers, with the tenth being the longest. In flight, the wings are mostly black when seen from above, but have a white trailing edge from the tips of the inner primaries. From underneath, the wings are predominantly white with dark tips. White feathers on the head and neck have pale grey bases, which are normally hidden. Non-breeding plumage is similar, but the chest band is less distinct and often diluted to an ashy brown or mottled with white. The legs are a paler- or orange-pink. There is no difference in plumage between the sexes, nor has any geographic variation been recorded.

Juvenile birds resemble adults but have a greyish forehead and lores, duller black wings, and lack the characteristic breast band. Adult plumage is attained in the second year. Their legs and feet are grey, becoming more blotched with pink until adulthood. Nestling banded stilts are covered in white down.

A distinctive bird, the banded stilt is hard to confuse with any other species; the white-headed stilt lacks the breast band, and the red-necked avocet has a chestnut head and neck, and a distinctly upcurved bill.

Adults make a barking call that has been written as cow or chowk, sometimes with two syllables as chowk-uk or chuk-uk. Birds also chatter softly and tunefully while nesting.

== Distribution and habitat ==
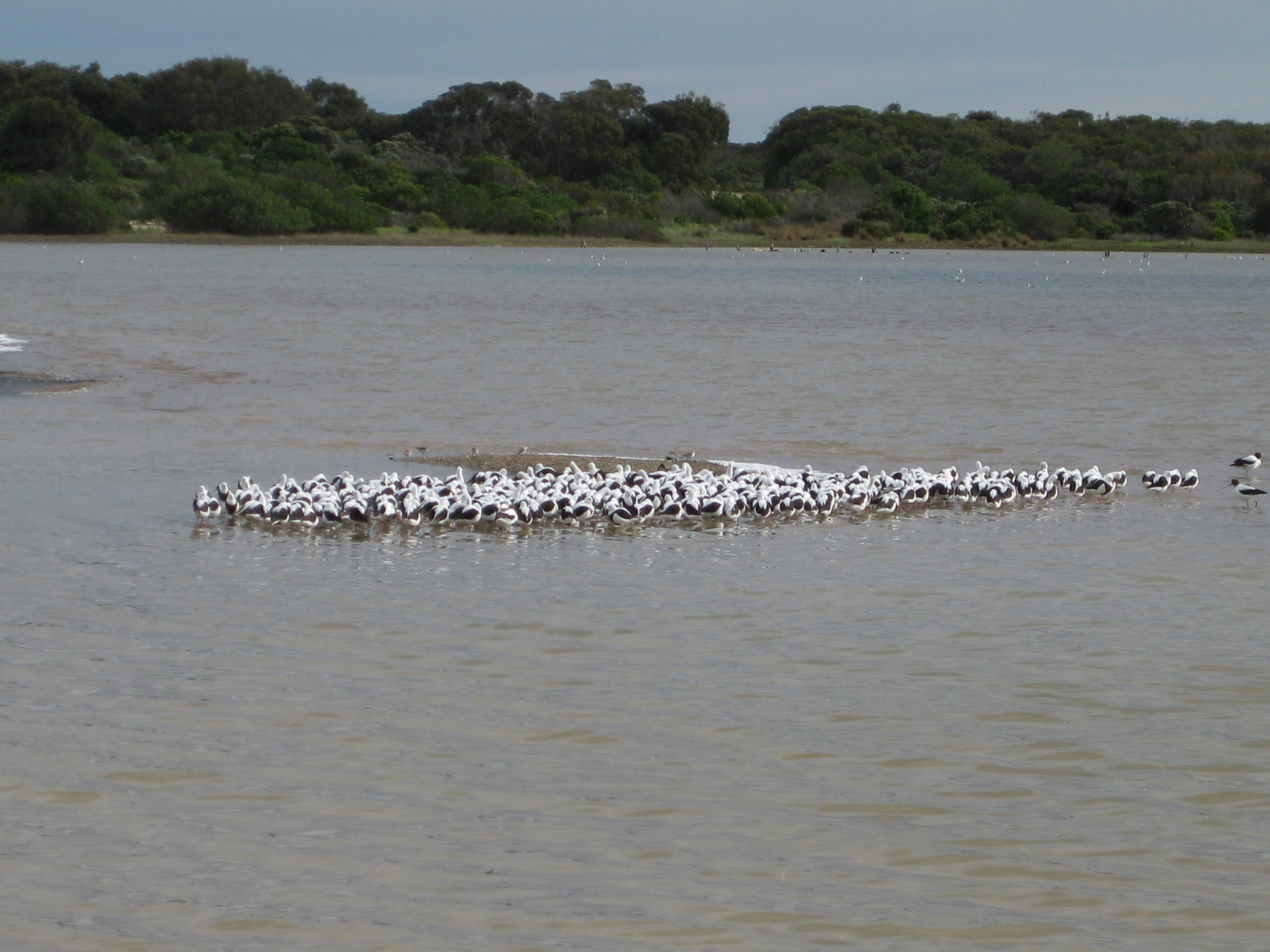
A colony of banded stilts, Coorong, South Australia; some red-necked avocets can be seen at far right.

The banded stilt is generally found in southern Australia. In Western Australia, it is found predominantly in the southwestern corner, though can be as far north as the saltworks in Port Hedland. Breeding took place at Lake Ballard in the Goldfields-Esperance after heavy rainfall from Cyclone Bobby in 1995, and then again after flooding in 2014. In 1933 a large colony had been recorded at Lake Grace, but had succumbed to attack presumably by foxes. The banded stilt has been recorded in southeastern South Australia, as well as the drainage of the Lake Eyre system, and in Victoria west of Port Phillip and the Wimmera. In July 2010 Lake Torrens filled with water, resulting in the influx of around 150,000 banded stilts. The Natimuk-Douglas Wetlands in western Victoria are an important nesting ground for the species, though lower numbers come here if there is flooding elsewhere in southeastern Australia. In New South Wales, it is most commonly found in the Riverina and western parts of the state, and has reached southern Queensland and the Northern Territory, where it has been found at the sewage ponds at Alice Springs and Erldunda. It has been recorded as a vagrant to Tasmania, with significant numbers recorded in 1981.

The preferred habitats are large, shallow saline or hypersaline lakes, either inland or near the coast, including ephemeral salt lakes, salt works, lagoons, salt- or claypans and intertidal flats. The species is occasionally found in brackish or fresh water, including farm dams and sewage ponds.

The banded stilt is highly nomadic, having adapted to the unpredictable climate of Australia's arid interior. Sudden rainfall results in the influx of water to and filling of dry inland salt lakes. The stilts respond by travelling to these areas and breeding, dispersing and returning to the coast once the lakes begin to dry up. How banded stilts on the coast become aware of inland rainfall is unknown. The distances travelled can be large; two birds have been tracked travelling from a drying Lake Eyre in South Australia to a newly filled lake system in Western Australia over 1,500 km (930 mi) away. One of these birds veered northwest over the Gibson Desert, travelling a minimum of 2,263 km (1,406 mi) in 55.9 hours.

== Behaviour ==
The banded stilt is gregarious; birds are almost always encountered in groups, from small troops of tens of birds, to huge flocks numbering in the tens of thousands.

=== Breeding ===
The breeding habits of the banded stilt were unknown until 1930, when a colony was discovered at Lake Grace. Even then they remained poorly known until 2012, when researcher Reece Pedler and colleagues attached tracking devices to 21 birds to gain an insight into the species' movements. They discovered that the birds travel large distances inland and gather at the recently filled bodies of water.

The majority of observed breeding events have occurred at inland salt lakes in South Australia and Western Australia immediately following freshwater inflows. An exception to this exists where some breeding was attempted at The Coorong during a time in which salinity in the Lower Lakes was significantly elevated due to reduced environmental flows down the Murray River. Breeding events are initiated by the filling of shallow inland lakes after rainfall and resultant explosion in numbers of food animals such as Parartemia brine shrimp. This can happen at any time of year. Breeding sites are generally on low islands, of 1–1.5 m (3–5 ft) elevation, or spits on or alongside large lakes, on clay or gravel and generally with sparse or no vegetation. The nests themselves are scrapes in the soil, up to 15 cm (5.9 in) across and 3 cm (1 in) deep, with or without some dead vegetation as lining. Birds on stony soils generally gather vegetation instead of digging scrapes.

Egg clutches number three to four (or rarely five) oval eggs, which vary from fawn to white marked with brown to black splotches. They can be 49–58 mm (1.9–2.3 in) long and 35–48 mm (1.4–1.9 in) wide. Incubation takes 19 to 21 days, with both sexes sharing duties, although the male takes over as sole incubator as the eggs hatch and immediately afterwards. This is thought to allow the females to lay and incubate a second brood if the water and food in the lake persists. Parent birds incubate for one to six days before swapping with the other parent. These intervals are much longer than other waders, and thought to be due to the remoteness of food—either the prey are blown to remote corners of the lakes by the wind or the lakes themselves have receded as they have dried. Parents almost always changeover incubating at night, generally within two hours of nightfall, presumably to avoid predators. On hot days with temperatures over 40 °C (104 °F), incubating birds may leave briefly to wet their brood patches to presumably cool the eggs or young. Birds on nests always face into the wind.

The nestlings are born covered in white down—unlike any other waders—and mobile with open eyes (precocial) and leave the nest soon after hatching (nidifugous). Adults lead the young birds to the water by the time they are two days old. Once in the water, they begin to feed on tiny crustaceans.

=== Nest predators and hazards ===
Banded stilt colonies suffer greatly from predation by silver gulls (Chroicocephalus novaehollandiae), while wedge-tailed eagles (Aquila audax), white-bellied sea eagles (Haliaeetus leucogaster), spot-bellied eagle-owls (Bubo nipalensis) and black falcons (Falco subniger) also take stilts and young. Premature drying of the lakes leads to parents abandoning their eggs or nestlings, resulting in the deaths of many thousands of young.

=== Feeding ===
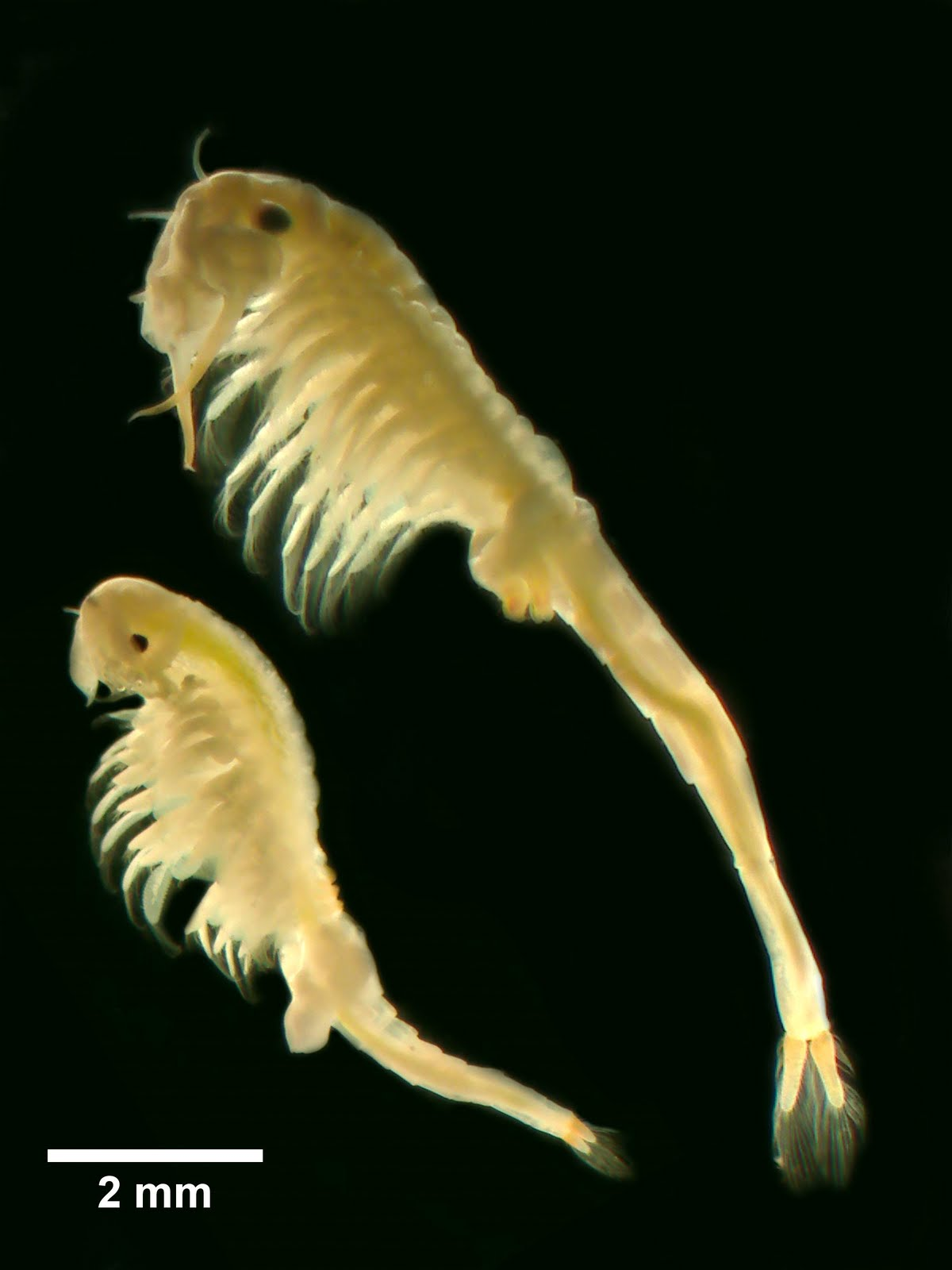
Parartemia zietziana (male + female), a prey item of the banded stilt

The banded stilt forages by walking or swimming in shallow water, pecking, probing or scything into the water or mud. The bulk of its diet is made up of tiny crustaceans, including branchiopods, ostracods (seed shrimp), anostraca (fairy shrimp) such as Artemia salina and members of the genus Parartemia, both genera of notostraca (tadpole shrimp), and isopods such as the genera Deto and Haloniscus. They also eat molluscs, including both gastropods such as the land snail Salinator fragilis and members of the genus Coxiella, and bivalves of the genus Sphaericum, insects (such as bugs, beetles, flies and flying ants, which they glean from the water surface), and plants such as Ruppia. Small fish such as hardyheads (Craterocephalus spp.) have also been reportedly eaten.

== Status and conservation ==
In 2016, the banded stilt was rated as least concern on the IUCN Red List of Endangered species. This was on the basis of its large range—greater than 20,000 km^{2} (7700 mi^{2})—and fluctuating rather than declining population. However, it is listed as Vulnerable under the South Australian National Parks and Wildlife Act 1972. The listing was made after breeding attempts observed at Lake Eyre revealed heavy predation from silver gulls. The Department of Environment, Water and Natural Resources has developed a strategy for managing silver gull predation at chosen banded stilt breeding sites by applying site-specific culling measures. Breeding events observed at ephemeral lakes in Western Australia have proven to be more successful without the need for intervention due to their remoteness.
