= Deto aucklandiae =

Scientific classification
- Kingdom: Animalia
- Phylum: Arthropoda
- Class: Malacostraca
- Order: Isopoda
- Suborder: Oniscidea
- Family: Detonidae
- Genus: Deto
- Species: D. aucklandiae

Binomial name
- Deto aucklandiae (Thomson, 1879)

Species of crustacean

Deto aucklandiae is a species of seashore dwelling woodlouse from the Detonidae family. D. aucklandiae is endemic to a few subantarctic islands in New Zealand.

== Taxonomy ==
Deto aucklandiae was first described in 1879 as Actaecia aucklandiae. In 1906, D. aucklandiae was described again as Deto magnifica and Deto robusta. A. aucklandiae was then moved to the Deto genus in 2003 and D. magnifica and D. robusta were recognized as synonyms.

== Description ==
Deto aucklandiae are a large, sexually dimorphic species, with males reaching 20-24mm in length and females reaching 12-19mm in length. Males have large, thick antennae and a dorsal surface that is covered in spine like tubercles. Females have more slender antennae than the males and can also be distinguished by a slight groove present in segments 2, 3 and 4.

== Distribution ==
Deto aucklandiae occurs in the coastal zone of subantarctic islands in New Zealand. They are known to occur on Auckland Island, Campbell Island and Snares Island.
