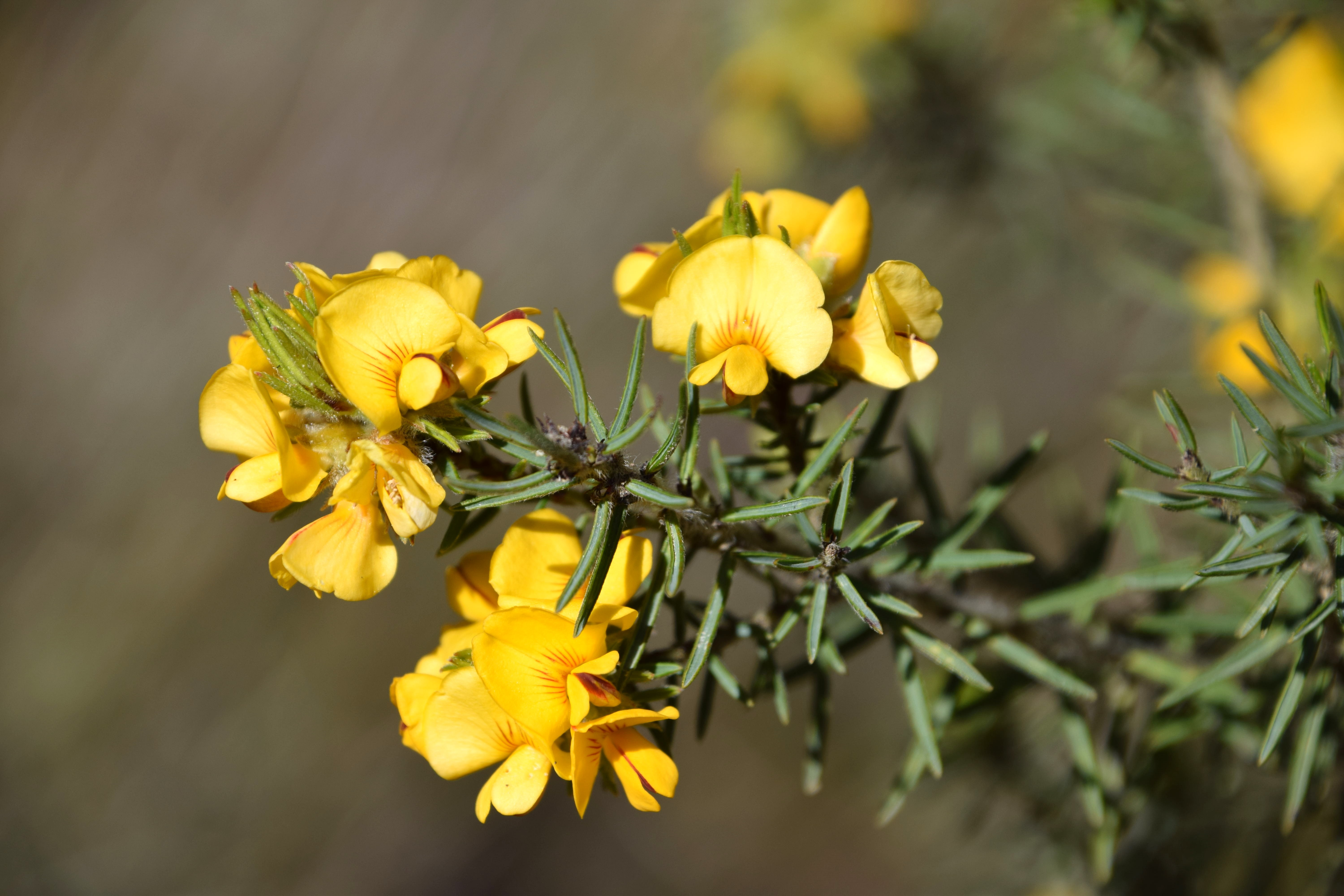
- In the Grampians National Park

Scientific classification
- Kingdom: Plantae
- Clade: Tracheophytes
- Clade: Angiosperms
- Clade: Eudicots
- Clade: Rosids
- Order: Fabales
- Family: Fabaceae
- Subfamily: Faboideae
- Genus: Pultenaea
- Species: P. daltonii

Binomial name
- Pultenaea daltonii H.B.Will.

= Pultenaea daltonii =

Hoary bush-pea

Species of flowering plant

Pultenaea daltonii, commonly known as hoary bush-pea, is a species of flowering plant in the family Fabaceae and is endemic to western Victoria, Australia. It is a spreading shrub with cylindrical leaves, grooved on the upper surface, and clusters of yellow flowers with red markings.

== Description ==
Pultenaea daltonii is an erect shrub that typically grows to a height of up to 1.5 m (4 ft 11 in) and has hairy stems. The leaves are cylindrical with a longitudinal groove on the upper surface and 5–10 mm (0.20–0.39 in) long with triangular to lance-shaped stipules 1.5–3 mm (0.059–0.118 in) long at the base. The flowers are arranged in leaf axils in clusters of eight to sixteen. The sepals are about 6–7 mm (0.24–0.28 in) long with leaf-like, three-lobed bracteoles 5–6 mm (0.20–0.24 in) long at the base of the sepal tube. The standard petal is 8–10 mm (0.31–0.39 in), the ovary is covered with long hairs and the fruit is a hairy pod surrounded by the remains of the sepals.

== Taxonomy and naming ==
Pultenaea daltonii was first formally described in 1922 by Herbert Bennett Williamson in the Proceedings of the Royal Society of Victoria from specimens collected by St. Eloy D'Alton between Nhill and Goroke, Victoria, in 1897. The specific epithet (daltonii) honours the collector of the type specimens.

== Distribution and habitat ==
This pultenaea usually grows in dry rainforest and occurs in scattered locations in western and south-western Victoria.
