= Armadilloniscus lindahli =

Scientific classification
- Kingdom: Animalia
- Phylum: Arthropoda
- Class: Malacostraca
- Order: Isopoda
- Suborder: Oniscidea
- Family: Detonidae
- Genus: Armadilloniscus
- Species: A. lindahli

Binomial name
- Armadilloniscus lindahli (H. Richardson, 1905)

Species of crustacean

Armadilloniscus lindahli is a species of woodlouse in the family Detonidae. It is found in North America and Mexico.
