= Detonella papillicornis =

Scientific classification
- Kingdom: Animalia
- Phylum: Arthropoda
- Class: Malacostraca
- Order: Isopoda
- Suborder: Oniscidea
- Family: Detonidae
- Genus: Detonella
- Species: D. papillicornis

Binomial name
- Detonella papillicornis (H. Richardson, 1904)

Species of crustacean

Detonella papillicornis is a species of woodlouse in the family Detonidae. It is found in North America and temperate Asia.
