= Natimuk-Douglas Wetlands =

Wetland system in Victoria, Australia

Coordinates: 36°49′48″S 141°49′01″E

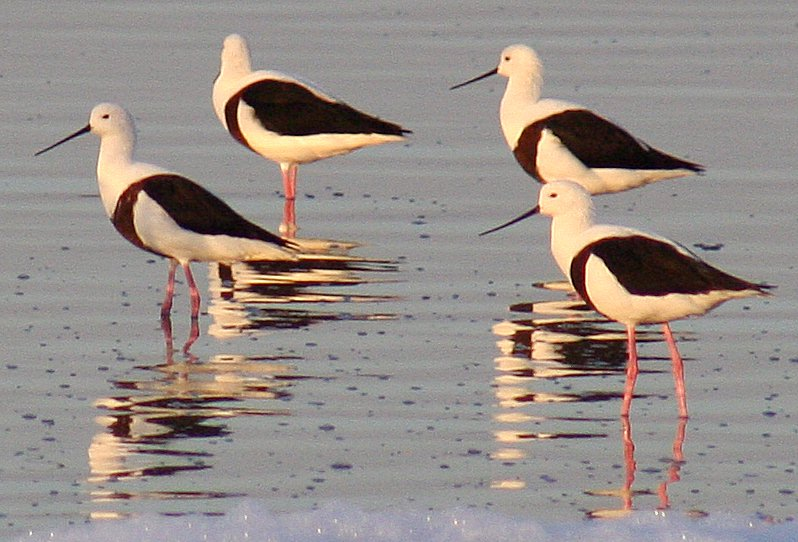
The wetlands are sometimes important for banded stilts

The Natimuk-Douglas Wetlands comprise a chain of freshwater, brackish and saline wetlands in the semi-arid Wimmera region of western Victoria. Australia. They are important for waterbirds.

== Description ==
The wetlands lie between the small towns of Goroke on the west and Natimuk on the east, while the Little Desert National Park lies to the north and the Grampians National Park to the south-east. The Wimmera experiences hot, dry summers and mild, wet winters; waterbird numbers peak between July and November in most years, especially when there has been good local rainfall and when inland Australia is dry. Most of the wetlands are ephemeral and subject to seasonal flooding, but some retain water throughout the year. Many of the wetlands are fringed by saltmarsh; other plant communities such as sedgeland and paperbark forest also occur. Most of the wetlands have some protection in small, individual reserves surrounded by farmland, though seasonal waterfowl hunting is permitted on many.

== Birds ==
The area has been identified by BirdLife International as a highly fragmented 65 km^{2} Important Bird Area (IBA) because it has supported over 1% of the world populations of Australian shelducks, banded stilts, red-necked avocets and red-capped plovers. Other waterbirds sometimes using the site in moderate numbers include musk ducks, black swans, grey teals, hoary-headed grebes and sharp-tailed sandpipers. The saltmarsh provides foraging habitat for blue-winged parrots. red-tailed black cockatoos, flame robins and diamond firetails are occasionally seen.
