= Goroke P-12 College =

Coordinates: 36°42′58″S 141°29′02″E

Goroke P–12 College

Location
- Natimuk Frances Road; Goroke, Victoria, 3412; Australia

Information
- Motto: Vera Pro Gratis
- Established: 28 September 1885
- School number: 6223
- Principal: Dee Kearsley
- Gender: Co-ed
- Enrolment: 80
- Website: Goroke P–12 College

Goroke P–12 College is a public school in Goroke, Victoria, Australia.

== History ==
Goroke School was opened on 28 September 1885. The school first had a class of 10 boys and 10 girls. The original building was leased and of weather board construction with a shingle roof. The citizens of Goroke and district did not gain the present school complex with an unusual exertion of determination. So befitting the pioneering spirit that opened up the land for settlement.

It began in 1881, nine years after the passing of the Education Act of 1872, when citizens of Pleasant Banks asked the Department to look favorably upon their request for a school. The request was granted four years later. Today, more than one hundred years later, during Victoria's Bicentennial Year Celebration we can look back with satisfaction on a job well done.

The Goroke site was complete in 1955 and was named The Goroke Consolidated School then renamed in 1990 as Goroke P–12 College. The consolidation brought together all the schools in the district, such as Minimay, Nurcoung school, Gymbowen, Mitre and the Goroke school. Goroke was one of the original eleven P–12 colleges in Victoria.

Gymbowen School opened on 27 March 1881. It closed in August 1951. James Houston was the first to enrol 8 boys and 10 girls at the Gymbowen School. The 21 students that attended Gymbowen School then transferred to Goroke School when it closed down. Minimay School opened on 2 May 1885. Norman McLeod was the first to enrol 8 boys and 12 girls at the Minimay School. The school closed on 6 February 1951. The school building was removed to Goroke and there it became the library. Nurcoung School opened on 11 September 1886. Marie K. Monckton was the first to enrol 11 boys and 15 girls at the Nurcoung School. The school closed in 1955 and all the students transferred to Goroke School. Mitre School was located on the Mitre Nurcoung Road, Victoria. After the school closed down all the students transferred to Goroke School. Lemon Springs School opened on 4 June 1886. It closed some time during 1951. The school building then transferred to Goroke and the building was then used for the science room and later the art room. Booroopki School opened on 1 May 1886 and closed some time during 1891. It then opened again on 1 March 1909 and closed on 11 September 1951 due to the school's buildings being condemned. All the students then transferred to Goroke School.

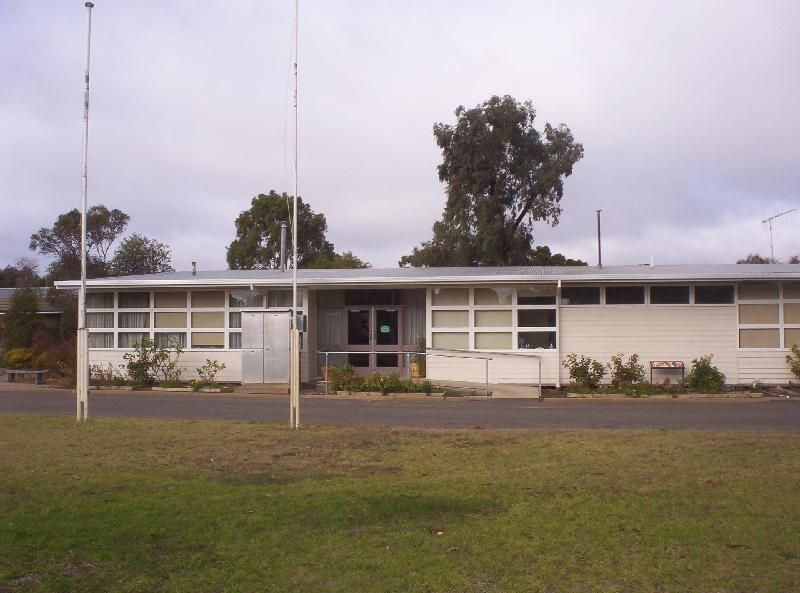
School front entrance

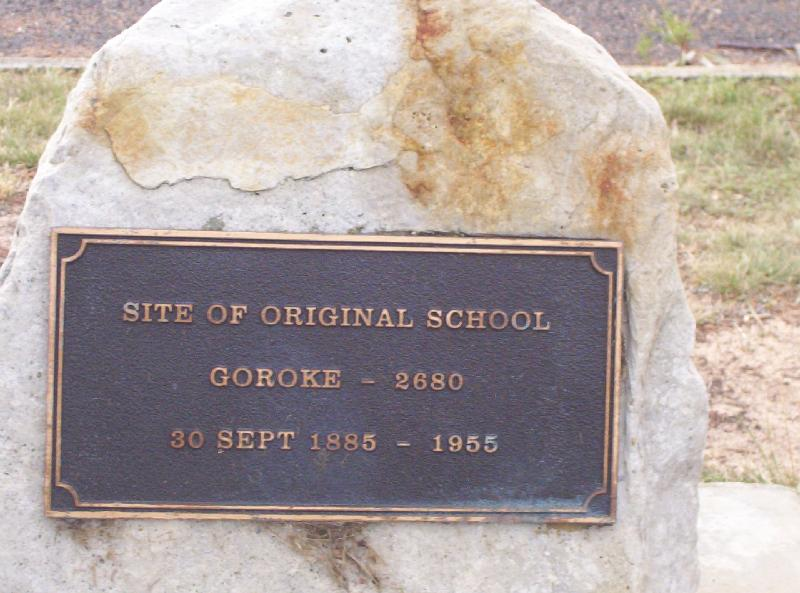
The old school's stone

== Sports and traditions ==
Each year Goroke P–12 College hosts many events including an annual swimming sports carnival and an athletics carnival. The school also attends many sporting carnivals school fete (every second year) and a talent quest (every year that the school fete isn't on). The school also has an end of the year school concert.

== Former principals ==
- Henry H. Pearson 1885
- Alexander Harmer 1886
- Charles S. McPherson 1886–1889
- James Houston 1889–1904
- (No record available from 1905 to 1906)
- William J. H. Fenton 1907–1908
- Mary Aburthnot 1908
- Charles E. Jelbart 1909–1910
- John Lane 1910–1911
- Frederick A. Hughes 1911–1916
- Ernest E. Wilson 1916–1918
- Joseph J. Klippel 1918–1921
- Daniel Griffin 1922–1935
- Frank A. Parker 1935–1938
- Matthew Egan 1938–1943
- Reginald B. Broben 1944–1947
- Jack Binder 1947–1953
- Norman C. Deckert 1953–1963
- Leslie H. Told 1963–1966
- John. A.E. Hellwedge 1966–1969
- Ronald Gordon 1969–1972
- Russell J. Manie 1972–1975
- Barry T. Judd 1975–1978
- Allen L. Rogers 1978–1982
- Raymond A. McCraw 1982–1985
- John Woolls-Cobb 1986–1987
- John Patterson 1987–1993
- Keith Pike 1994–1996
- Barry Hall 1997–2002
- Joy Forbes 2002–2013
- Therese Allen 2014–2018
- Dee Kearsley 2019–
