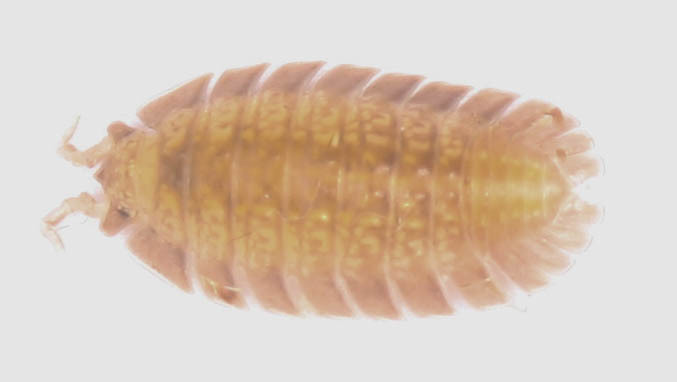
- Top view

Scientific classification
- Kingdom: Animalia
- Phylum: Arthropoda
- Class: Malacostraca
- Order: Isopoda
- Suborder: Oniscidea
- Family: Detonidae
- Genus: Armadilloniscus
- Species: A. holmesi

Binomial name
- Armadilloniscus holmesi Arcangeli, 1933

= Armadilloniscus holmesi =

Species of crustacean

Armadilloniscus holmesi is a species of woodlouse in the family Detonidae. It is found in North America, temperate Asia, and Mexico.

== Dimensions ==
The females have a length of 3.9mm and a width of 2.0, while the smaller males have a length of 2.2mm and a width 1.2mm
