= Minimay =

- Town
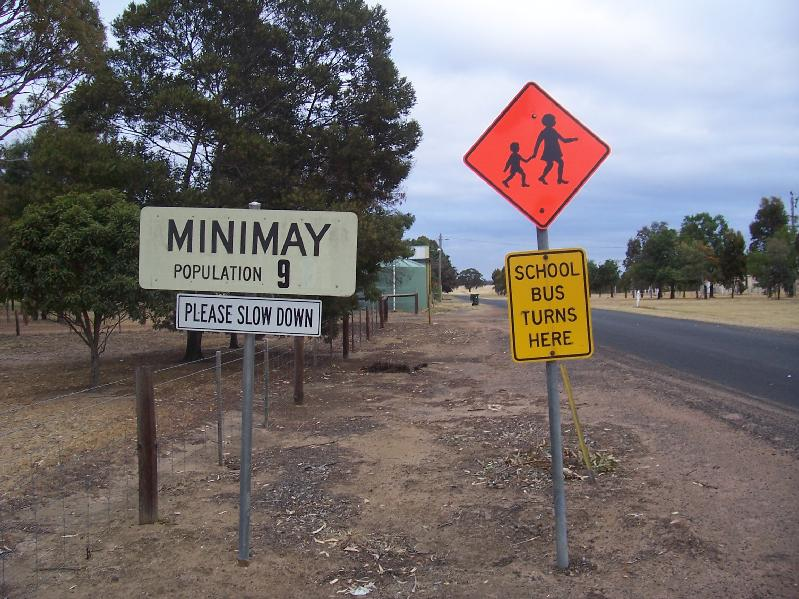
- Entry into Minimay with the population signposted

- Coordinates: 36°43′S 141°11′E
- Country: Australia
- State: Victoria
- LGA: Shire of West Wimmera
- Location: 400 km (250 mi) NW of Melbourne; 352 km (219 mi) SE of Adelaide; 99 km (62 mi) W of Horsham; 30 km (19 mi) W of Goroke; 30 km (19 mi) E of Frances (SA)

Government
  - State electorate: Lowan
  - Federal division: Mallee

Population
  - Total: 64 (2021 census)
- Postcode: 3413

Minimay is a locality located in Victoria, Australia. The locality is in the Shire of West Wimmera 25 kilometres (25,000 m) from the South Australian border, about halfway between Melbourne and Adelaide. At the 2021 census, Minimay and the surrounding area recorded a population of 64. A signpost outside Minimay lists the population at 9.

== Geography ==
Farming is the main industry in Minimay and includes sheep and cattle breeding and arable crops. Center pivot irrigation is used to water crops and has given satellite images of the area a characteristic patchwork pattern of green circles. Before agriculture, the area was quite wooded; at the time trees were cleared, agriculture in Australia was not advanced and initial attempts to grow crops required much manual labour, and Minimay consequently had a higher population.

== Sporting ==
Sports today in Minimay is extinct with locals travelling to other sporting clubs in the district—including football and netball clubs. Minimay once had a golf club, basketball club, tennis club, racecourse, football club and cricket club.

=== Football ===
Border Districts Football Netball Club was originally a combined team with Minimay and Frances and today also includes Goroke. The club plays in the Kowree-Naracoorte-Tatiara Football League. The football ground still exists. Border District football club won premierships in - 1962, 1967, 1975, 1979, 1980, 1981, 1991, 1992 and 1996.

In July 1928 Minimay footballer, Cyril Stephens was fatally injured while playing against Gymbowen in the Koree Football Association.

=== Cricket ===
The Minimay Cricket Club is one of the oldest bodies in the district. Records are poor, but an old minute book suggests that the club was formed before 1896. The Minimay Cricket Club also won premierships during the 1900s. The cricket club now has been extinct for a long time.

=== Tennis ===
Tennis was first played in Minimay on a dirt court in 1913. The Minimay Tennis Club was first formed in 1919. Today the courts are in a different position than what they first were. 1967 they rebuilt the third court. Minimay again won many premierships in Tennis. The courts were last used in 1985 when the sport wasn't played any more.

=== Basketball ===
Minimay Basketball Club started in 1946. The Minimay Basketball team won ten premierships.

Minimay Race Club started in the early 1900s. Minimay Golf Club had a nine-hole course which was founded in 1931 and the Golf Club lasted for only 8 years.

== History ==
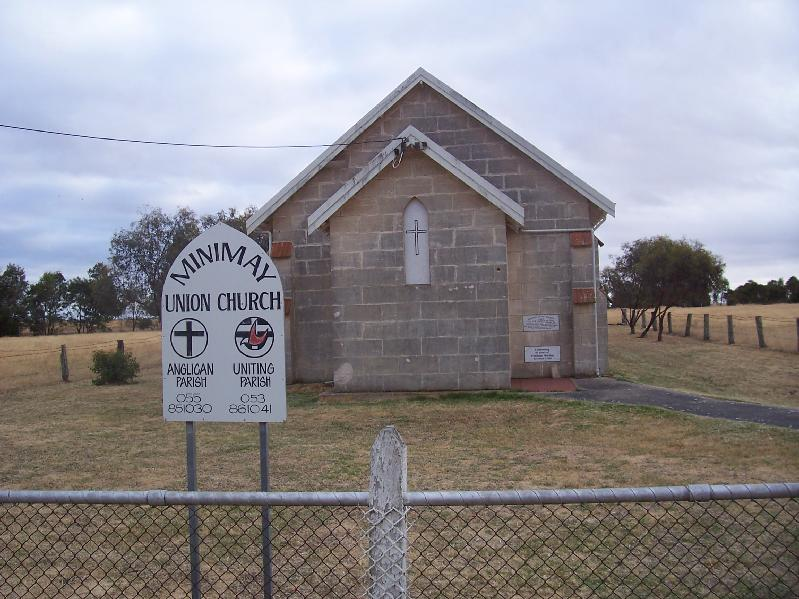
The Union church, a shared Anglican and Uniting church.

There have been two churches in Minimay: the first was Catholic and the second, dating from 1953, is "Union", Uniting and Anglican.

Minimay Post Office opened on 1 November 1877. In the early 1880s, selectors were taking up 320-acre blocks in the Minimay area.

In 1885, a new school in Minimay was designated: Minimay School No.2600. The school consisted of a small room which could hold 30 to 40 children. The school was closed in 1902 while it was painted and repaired. The school had planned to enlarge in 1906; this did not happen until 1911. A new school was built as the old school was infested by white ants. In 1951, the school was closed and most students moved to a school in nearby Goroke.

The poet John Shaw Neilson grew up in Minimay in the 1880s.

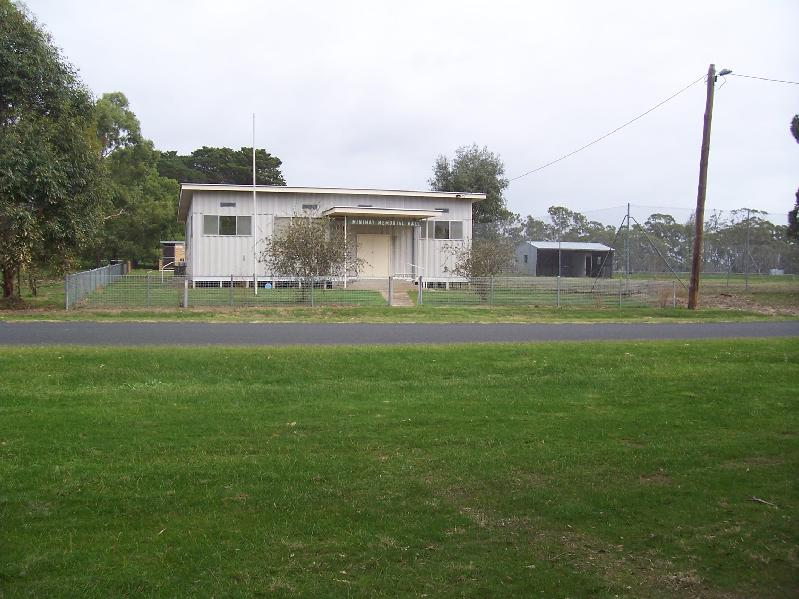
Memorial hall at Minimay

The Minimay Public Hall was built from 1901 to 1975. The Hall opened on 15 February 1991. In 1975, the old Hall was removed to make way for the new Minimay Memorial Hall. For the opening of the Minimay Memorial Hall, the community had a ball. Today, the Hall is still used for fund-raising and community events.

The first general store in Minimay was built in the 1880s. The first owners were from Harrow and they were Mr. and Mrs. Egan. The store had three rooms and a veranda. After a few years, the owners left and the store was destroyed by fire. Mr Carracher from the general store in Frances decided to build a new one in Minimay in 1901. In 1941, the president Mrs. McIntosh purchased the store. The shop was demolished on 12 February 1976. Later, a new Minimay store was built and this still runs. The store sells groceries and is a post office agency.

Work commenced to construct a telephone line, connecting Minimay to Goroke, Victoria, in 1908.
