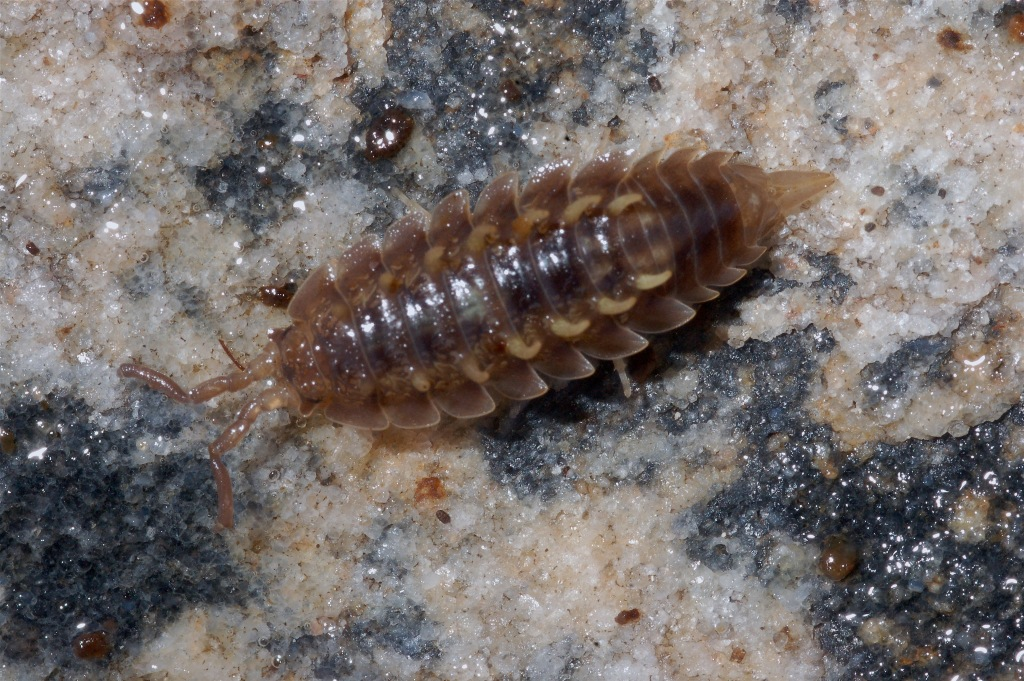

Scientific classification
- Kingdom: Animalia
- Phylum: Arthropoda
- Class: Malacostraca
- Order: Isopoda
- Suborder: Oniscidea
- Family: Detonidae
- Genus: Deto
- Species: D. echinata

Binomial name
- Deto echinata Guérin-Méneville, 1836

Synonyms
- Deto acinosa Budde-Lund, 1885; Deto armata Budde-Lund, 1906

= Deto echinata =

Species of woodlouse

Deto echinata, the horned isopod, is a species of air-breathing isopod, or woodlouse, in the family Detonidae. It inhabits seashores in southern Africa and on some oceanic islands.

== Description ==
Deto echinata is distinguished by a pair of long curved "horns" situated on the back of each segment of the thorax. These horns are substantially longer in males than in females. Horn length in males has been found to be correlated with body condition, and it is hypothesized that this sexual dimorphism acts as an indicator of overall fitness and is the result of sexual selection. Colouration is dark brown on the back, lighter brown in patches, underneath and on the extremities. Males have an average length of 30 mm, females of 22 mm, making the species one of the largest in the suborder.

== Distribution ==
The species occurs on the coast of southern Africa, having been recorded in Namibia, South Africa and Mozambique. It can also be found on Île Amsterdam and Île Saint-Paul in the southern Indian Ocean. It inhabits the intertidal zone, where it occurs on or under rocks, generally associated with kelp and other organic drift material.

== Ecology ==
Deto echinata is placed in the suborder Oniscidea, the woodlice, a group of crustaceans that is adapted to terrestrial rather than aquatic habitats. The species spends its life on shore, feeding mainly on drift algae and other washed-up plant material but also on carrion and small live prey. Where their ranges overlap in western South Africa, individuals are commonly mixed in with groups of the generally much more numerous, distantly related Ligia dilatata.
