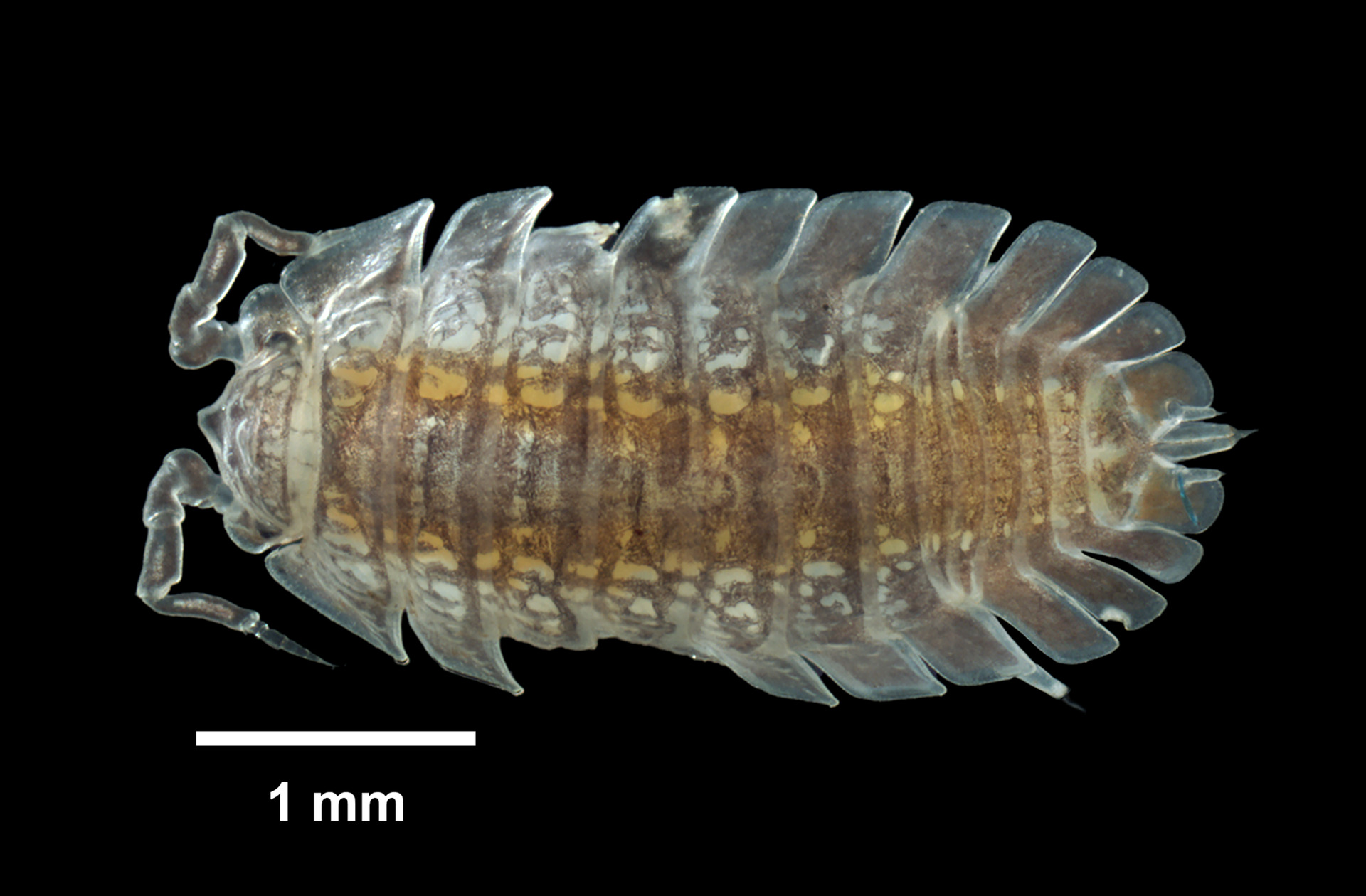

Scientific classification
- Kingdom: Animalia
- Phylum: Arthropoda
- Class: Malacostraca
- Order: Isopoda
- Suborder: Oniscidea
- Family: Detonidae
- Genus: Armadilloniscus; Uljanin, 1875

= Armadilloniscus =

Genus of crustaceans

Armadilloniscus is a genus of woodlice in the family Detonidae. There are more than 30 described species in Armadilloniscus.

== Species ==
These 36 species belong to the genus Armadilloniscus:

- Armadilloniscus aegaeus Schmalfuss, 1981
- Armadilloniscus aestuarii Verhoeff, 1930
- Armadilloniscus albus Nunomura, 1984
- Armadilloniscus amakusaensis Nunomura, 1984
- Armadilloniscus biltoni Taiti & Ferrara, 1989
- Armadilloniscus binodulus Lewis, 1992
- Armadilloniscus brevinaseus Nunomura, 1984
- Armadilloniscus bulgaricus Frankenberger, 1941
- Armadilloniscus candidus Budde-Lund, 1885
- Armadilloniscus caraibicus Paoletti & Stinner, 1989
- Armadilloniscus cecconii Dollfus, 1905
- Armadilloniscus conglobator Taiti & Ferrara, 1989
- Armadilloniscus coronacapitalis Menzies, 1950
- Armadilloniscus ellipticus (Harger, 1878)
- Armadilloniscus hawaiianus Taiti & Ferrara, 1989
- Armadilloniscus holmesi Arcangeli, 1933
- Armadilloniscus hoonsooi Kwon & Wang, 1996
- Armadilloniscus iliffei Taiti & Ferrara, 1989
- Armadilloniscus indicus Ferrara & Taiti, 1983
- Armadilloniscus japonicus Nunomura, 1984
- Armadilloniscus lamellatus Taiti & Ferrara, 1989
- Armadilloniscus lanyuensis Kwon & Wang, 1996
- Armadilloniscus letourneuxi Simon, 1885
- Armadilloniscus lindahli (H. Richardson, 1905)
- Armadilloniscus littoralis Budde-Lund, 1885
- Armadilloniscus malaccensis Taiti & Ferrara, 1989
- Armadilloniscus mekranensis Kazmi, 2004
- Armadilloniscus minutus Budde-Lund, 1879
- Armadilloniscus mirabilis Ferrara, 1974
- Armadilloniscus nasatus Budde-Lund, 1908
- Armadilloniscus ninae Schultz, 1984
- Armadilloniscus notojimensis (Nunomura, 1990)
- Armadilloniscus ornatocephalus Lewis, 1992
- Armadilloniscus quadricornis Vandel, 1970
- Armadilloniscus steptus Schotte & Heard, 1991
- Armadilloniscus tuberculatus (Holmes & Gay, 1909)
