= Shire of West Wimmera =

Coordinates: 36°43′00″S 141°28′00″E

- Local government area
- Location in Victoria

- Interactive map of Shire of West Wimmera
- Country: Australia
- State: Victoria
- Region: Grampians
- Established: 1995
- Council seat: Edenhope

Government
  - Mayor: Cr Bruce Meyer
  - State electorate: Lowan
  - Federal division: Mallee

Area
  - Total: 9,108 km^{2} (3,517 sq mi)

Population
  - Total: 3,862 (2018)
  - Density: 0.42402/km^{2} (1.09821/sq mi)
- Gazetted: 20 January 1995
- Website: Shire of West Wimmera
LGAs around Shire of West Wimmera
Southern Mallee (SA)	Mildura	Hindmarsh
Tatiara (SA)	Shire of West Wimmera	Horsham
Naracoorte Lucindale (SA)	Glenelg	Southern Grampians

The Shire of West Wimmera is a local government area in the western part of the Wimmera region of Victoria, Australia, located in the western part of the state. It covers an area of 9,108 square kilometres (3,517 mi^{2}) and in June 2018 had a population of 3,862. It includes the towns of Apsley, Edenhope, Goroke, Gymbowen, Harrow, Kaniva, Minimay, Nurcoung and Serviceton.

The Shire is governed and administered by the West Wimmera Shire Council; its seat of local government and administrative centre is located at the council headquarters in Edenhope, it also has a service centre located in Kaniva. The Shire is named after the Wimmera region, in which the LGA occupies the western portion. The LGA is also located entirely to the west of the Wimmera River, which actually meanders through the Rural City of Horsham to the east.

== History ==
The Shire of West Wimmera was formed in 1995 from the amalgamation of the Shire of Kaniva, the bulk of the Shire of Kowree, the northern half of the former Shire of Glenelg and part of the Shire of Arapiles.

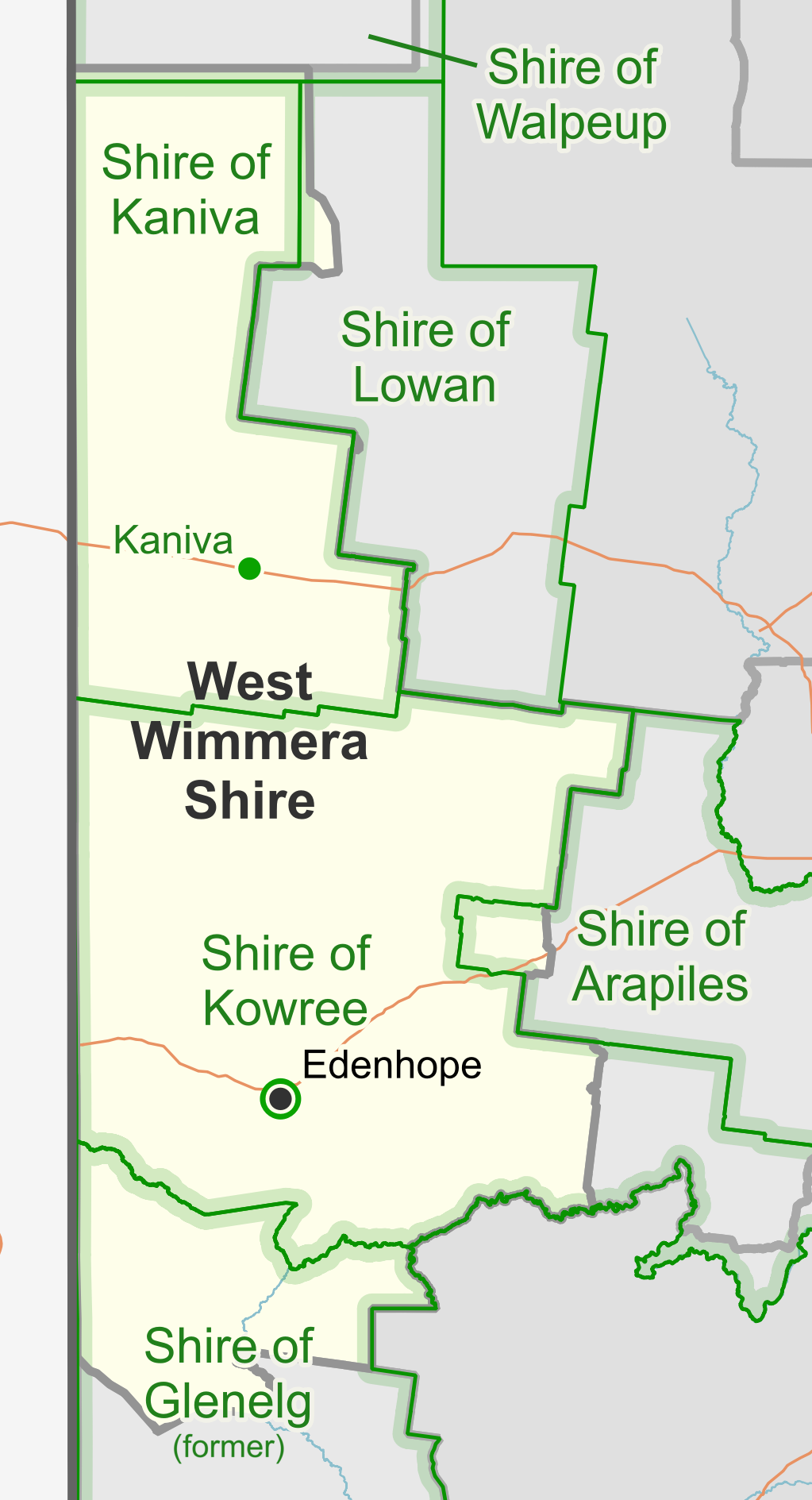
West Wimmera Shire's predecessor LGAs (green) as they were in 1994. The administrative centres of the former LGAs are marked by green dots.

== Council ==
=== Current composition ===
The council is composed of five councillors elected to represent an unsubdivided municipality. Council Composition as of November 2025.

Ward	Councillor	Notes
Unsubdivided	Tim Meyer	Mayor
Unsubdivided	Helen Hobbs	Deputy Mayor
Unsubdivided	Jodie Pretlove	
Unsubdivided	Richard William Hicks	
Unsubdivided	Tom Houlihan	

=== Administration and governance ===
The council meets in the council chambers in the Edenhope and Kaniva Municipal Offices. It also provides customer services at both centres.

=== Controversies ===
In April 2022, Mayor Bruce Meyer caused outrage by likening requests to display the internationally recognised LGBTIQ+ pride flag to mark the International Day Against Homophobia, Biphobia, Intersexism and Transphobia (IDAHOBIT) to the promotion of pedophilia.

== Townships and localities ==
The 2021 census documented the shire's population at 4,006, up from 3,903 in the 2016 census.

Population
Locality	2016	2021
Apsley	277	329
Benayeo	61	69
Big Desert^	3	8
Bringalbert	12	6
Broughton^	145	65
Charam	38	42
Chetwynd^	86	85
Connewirricoo	24	23
Dergholm^	43	57
Dorodong	38	21
Douglas^	65	74
Edenhope	946	937
Goroke	299	295
Grass Flat^	*	#
Gymbowen	52	60
Harrow^	200	184
Kadnook	41	41
Kaniva^	803	891
Karnak	12	9
Langkoop	111	100
Lawloit	15	14
Lillimur	110	112
Miga Lake	28	33
Minimay	84	64
Miram	40	36
Mitre^	69	66
Neuarpurr	55	56
Nurcoung	40	33
Ozenkadnook	30	25
Patyah	62	58
Peronne	48	49
Poolaijelo	40	26
Powers Creek	15	5
Serviceton	120	129
Tarrayoukyan^	21	25
Telopea Downs	45	44
Ullswater	43	47
Wombelano	41	49

^ - Territory divided with another LGA
* - Not noted in 2016 Census
# - Not noted in 2021 Census

== See also ==
- List of places of worship in West Wimmera Shire
- List of places on the Victorian Heritage Register in the Shire of West Wimmera
