= Bringalbert =

- Town
- Coordinates: 36°50′31″S 141°9′19″E
- Country: Australia
- State: Victoria
- LGA: Shire of West Wimmera

Government
  - State electorate: Mildura
  - Federal division: Mallee

Population
  - Total: 12 (2016 census)
- Postcode: 3319

Bringalbert is a locality in the western part of the Wimmera region of Victoria, Australia.
