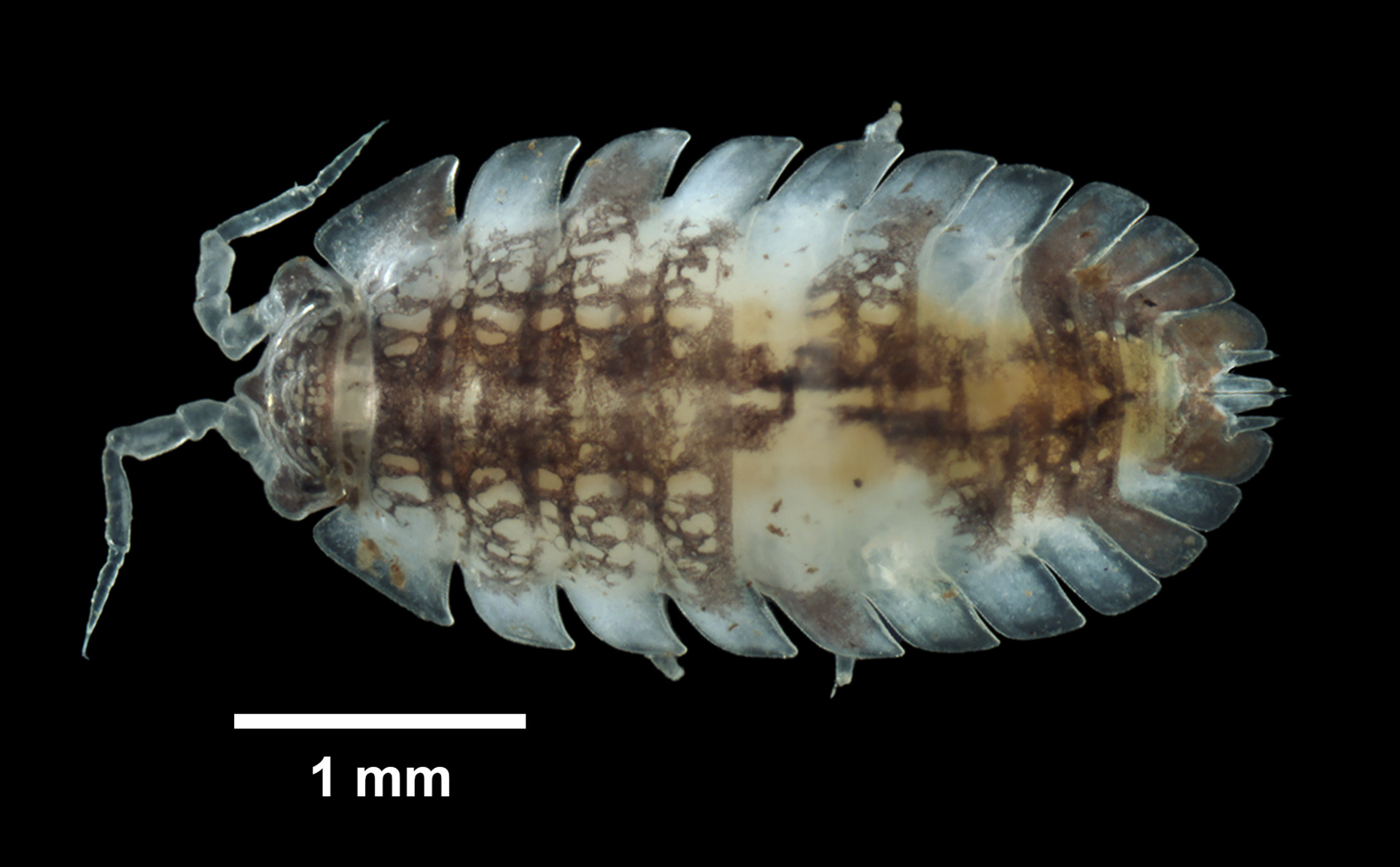

Scientific classification
- Kingdom: Animalia
- Phylum: Arthropoda
- Class: Malacostraca
- Order: Isopoda
- Suborder: Oniscidea
- Family: Detonidae
- Genus: Armadilloniscus
- Species: A. ellipticus

Binomial name
- Armadilloniscus ellipticus (Harger, 1878)

= Armadilloniscus ellipticus =

Species of crustacean

Armadilloniscus ellipticus is a species of woodlouse in the family Detonidae. It is found in North America, Oceania, Europe, temperate Asia, Africa, and the Caribbean.

== Subspecies ==
These two subspecies belong to the species Armadilloniscus ellipticus:

- Armadilloniscus littoralis littoralis
- Armadilloniscus littoralis madeirae Arcangeli, 1957
