= Detonella =

Scientific classification
- Kingdom: Animalia
- Phylum: Arthropoda
- Class: Malacostraca
- Order: Isopoda
- Suborder: Oniscidea
- Family: Detonidae
- Genus: Detonella; Lohmander, 1927

Genus of crustaceans

Detonella is a genus of woodlice in the family Detonidae. There are at least two described species in Detonella.

== Species ==
These two species belong to the genus Detonella:

- Detonella papillicornis (H. Richardson, 1904)
- Detonella sachalina Verhoeff, 1942
