= Charam, Victoria =

Charam Victoria
- Coordinates: 36°59′10″S 141°30′24″E
- Population: 38 (2016 census)
- Postcode(s): 3318
- LGA(s): Shire of West Wimmera
- State electorate(s): Mildura
- Federal division(s): Mallee

Charam is a locality in the western part of the Wimmera region of Victoria, Australia.
