= Benayeo =

- Town
- Coordinates: 36°49′28″S 141°0′29″E
- Country: Australia
- State: Victoria
- LGA: Shire of West Wimmera

Government
  - State electorate: Mildura
  - Federal division: Mallee

Population
  - Total: 69 (2021 census)
- Postcode: 3319

Benayeo is a locality in the western part of the Wimmera region of Victoria, Australia it was home to Lachlan Busiko who currently plays hockey for Australia.

== Demographics ==
As of the 2021 Australian census, 69 people resided in Benayeo, up from 61 in the 2016 census. The median age of persons in Benayeo was 48 years. There were fewer males than females, with 47.1% of the population male and 52.9% female. The average household size was 2.5 people per household.
