= Aspergillus ellipticus =

Scientific classification
- Kingdom: Fungi
- Division: Ascomycota
- Class: Eurotiomycetes
- Order: Eurotiales
- Family: Aspergillaceae
- Genus: Aspergillus
- Species: A. ellipticus

Binomial name
- Aspergillus ellipticus Raper & Fennell (1965)

Synonyms
- Aspergillus helicothrix

Species of fungus

Aspergillus ellipticus (also named A. helicothrix) is a species of fungus in the genus Aspergillus. A. ellipticus belongs to the group of black Aspergilli, which are important industrial workhorses. A. ellipticus belongs to the Nigri section. The species was first described in 1965, and has been shown to produce sclerotia.

The genome of A. ellipticus was sequenced and published in 2014 as part of the Aspergillus whole-genome sequencing project – a project dedicated to performing whole-genome sequencing of all members of the Aspergillus genus. The genome assembly size was 42.87 Mbp.

== Growth and morphology ==
Aspergillus ellipticus has been cultivated on both Czapek yeast extract agar (CYA) plates and Malt Extract Agar Oxoid® (MEAOX) plates. The growth morphology of the colonies can be seen in the pictures below.

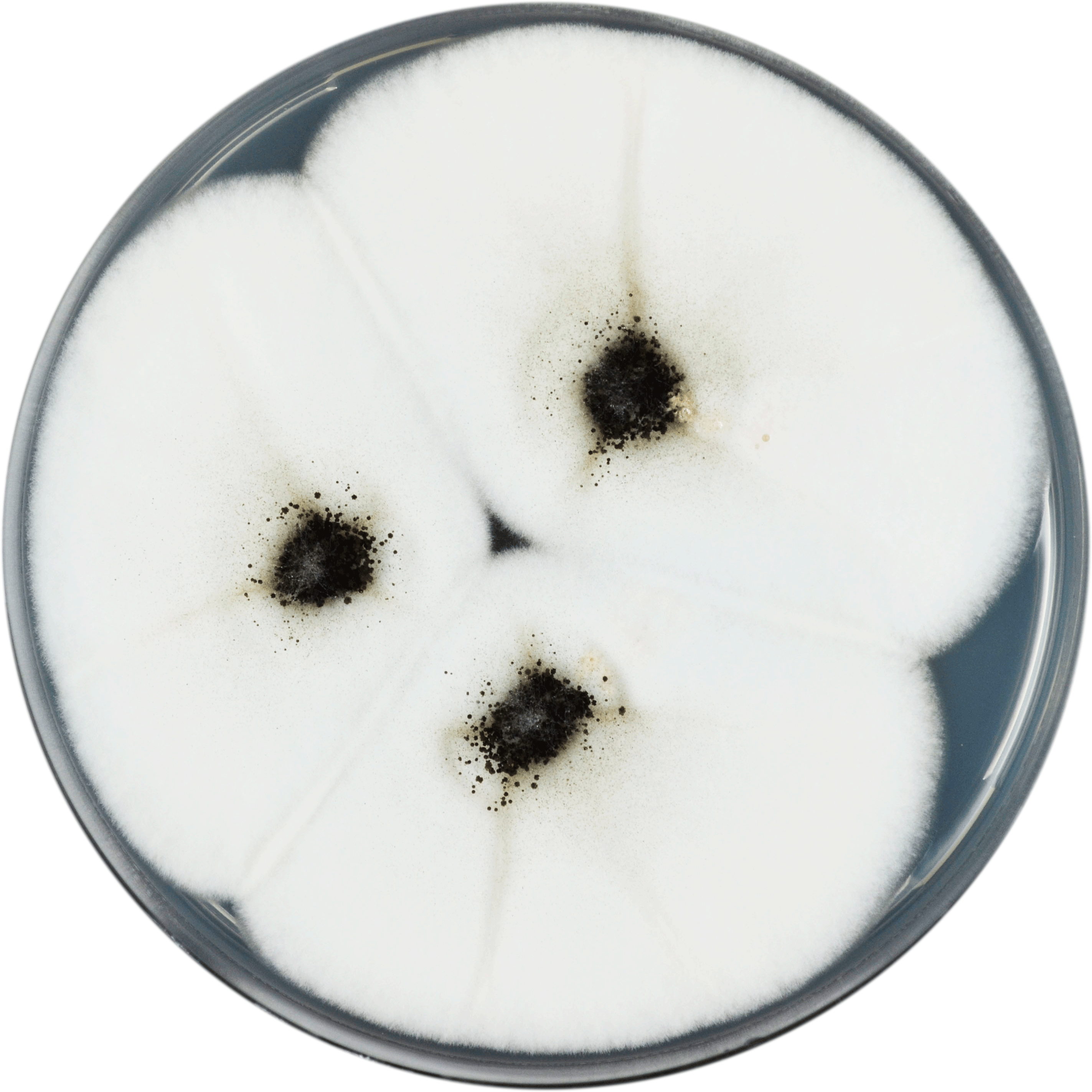
Aspergillus ellipticus growing on CYA plate

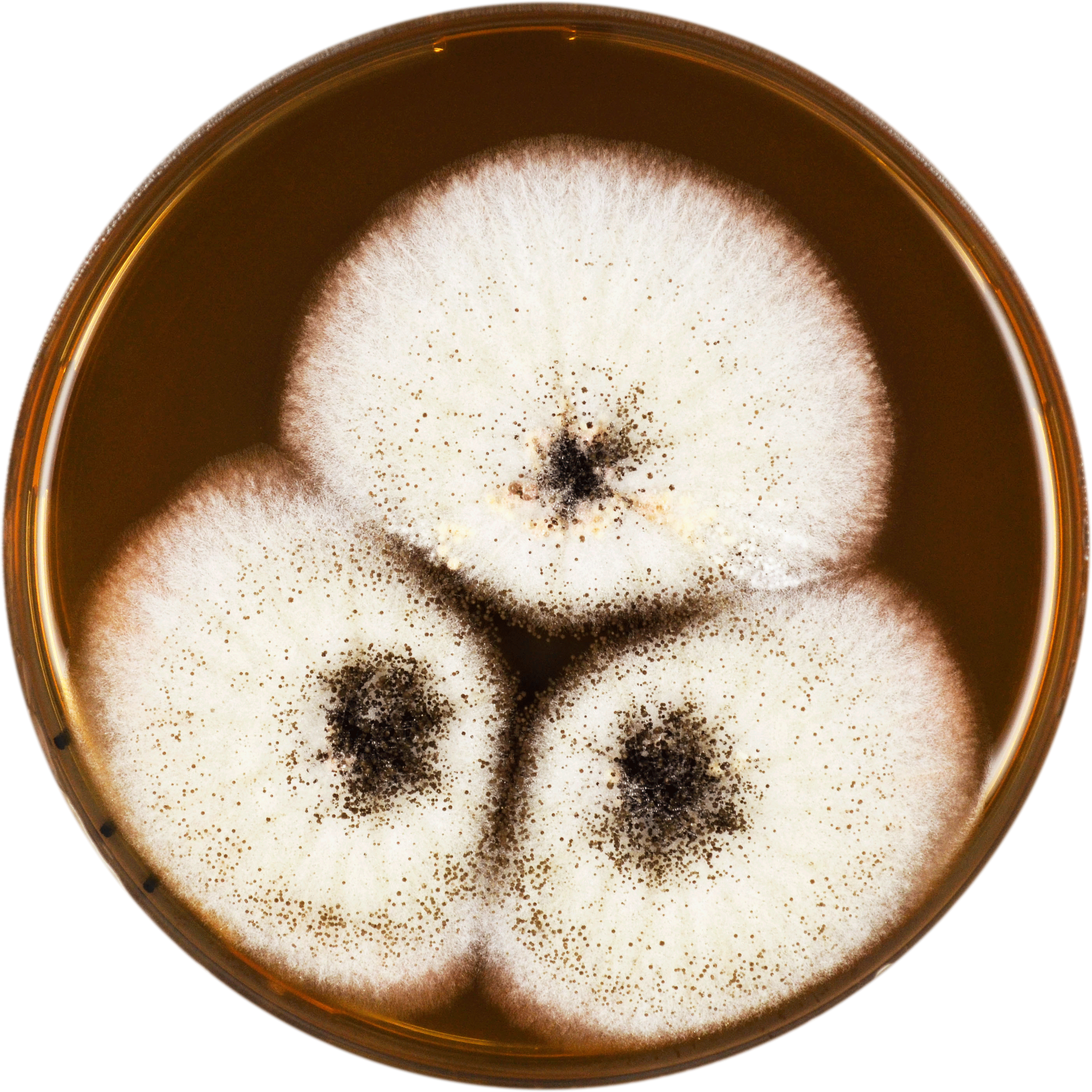
Aspergillus ellipticus growing on MEAOX plate
