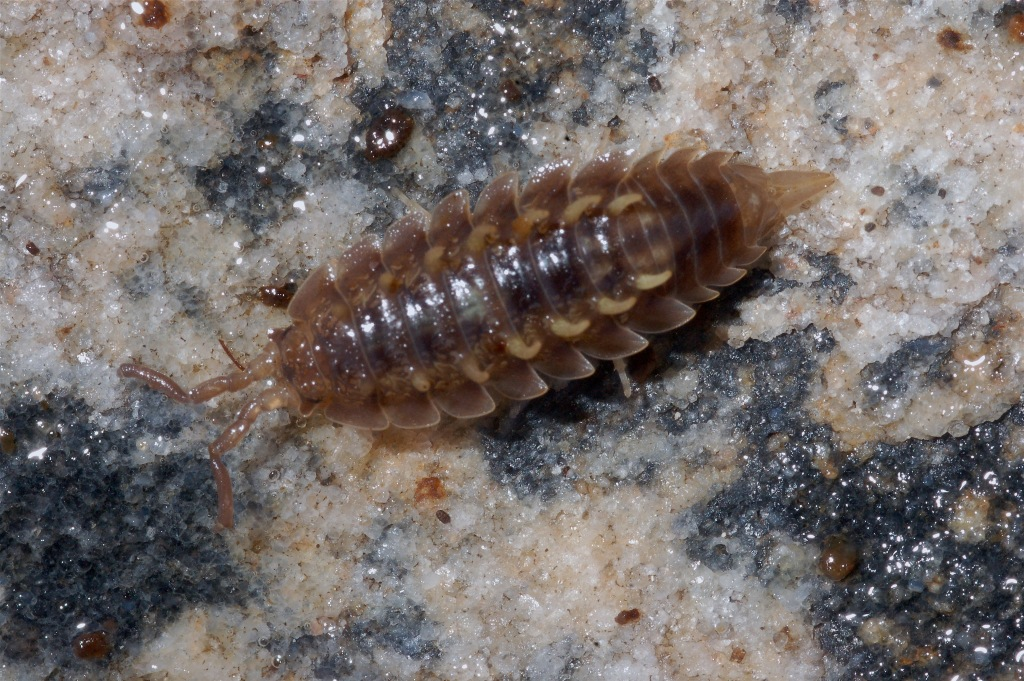
- Deto echinata

Scientific classification
- Kingdom: Animalia
- Phylum: Arthropoda
- Class: Malacostraca
- Order: Isopoda
- Suborder: Oniscidea
- Family: Detonidae
- Genus: Deto; Guérin-Méneville, 1836

= Deto (crustacean) =

Woodlouse genus

Deto is a genus of woodlice in the family Detonidae. Members of this genus can be found along the coasts in areas of New Zealand, Namibia, South Africa and Australia.

== Species ==
As of 2019, five species of Deto are accepted by the World Register of Marine Species. Additionally, one species, Deto spinicornis, is listed as nomen dubium.

- Deto aucklandiae (Thomson, 1879)
- Deto bucculenta (Nicolet, 1849)
- Deto echinata Guérin-Méneville, 1836
- Deto marina (Chilton, 1885)
- Deto whitei Kinahan, 1859
