= Miga Lake =

Miga Lake Victoria
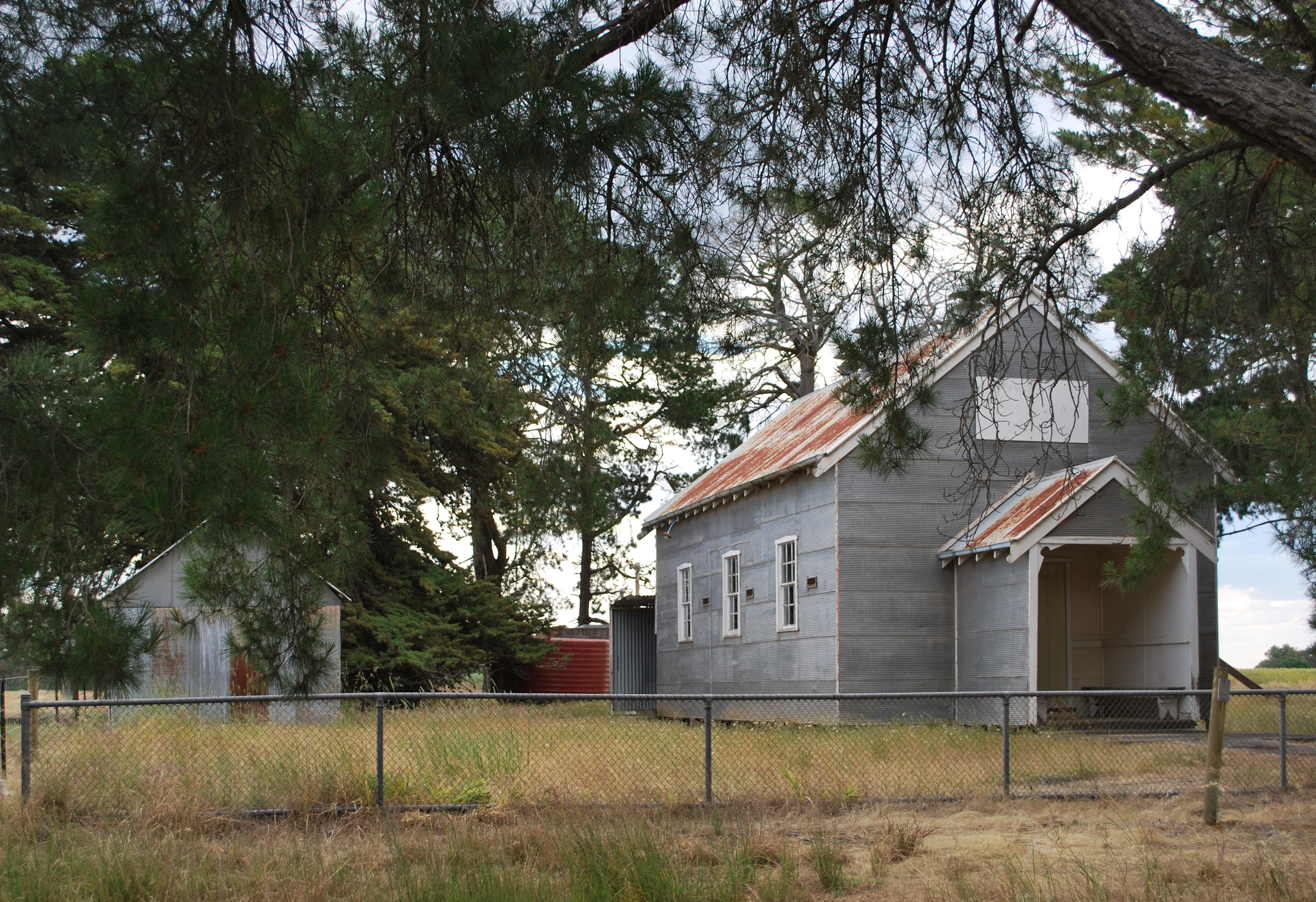
- Public hall, Miga Lake

- Coordinates: 36°55′32″S 141°38′12″E
- Population: 28 (2016 census)
- Postcode(s): 3409
- Location: 360 km (224 mi) WNW of Melbourne; 60 km (37 mi) SW of Horsham; 45 km (28 mi) NW of Edenhope
- LGA(s): Shire of West Wimmera
- State electorate(s): Lowan
- Federal division(s): Mallee

Miga Lake is a locality in western Victoria, Australia. The locality is in the Shire of West Wimmera local government area, 360 kilometres (220 mi) west north west of the state capital, Melbourne.

At the 2016 census, Miga Lake had a population of 28.
