= Gymbowen, Victoria =

Gymbowen
- Town
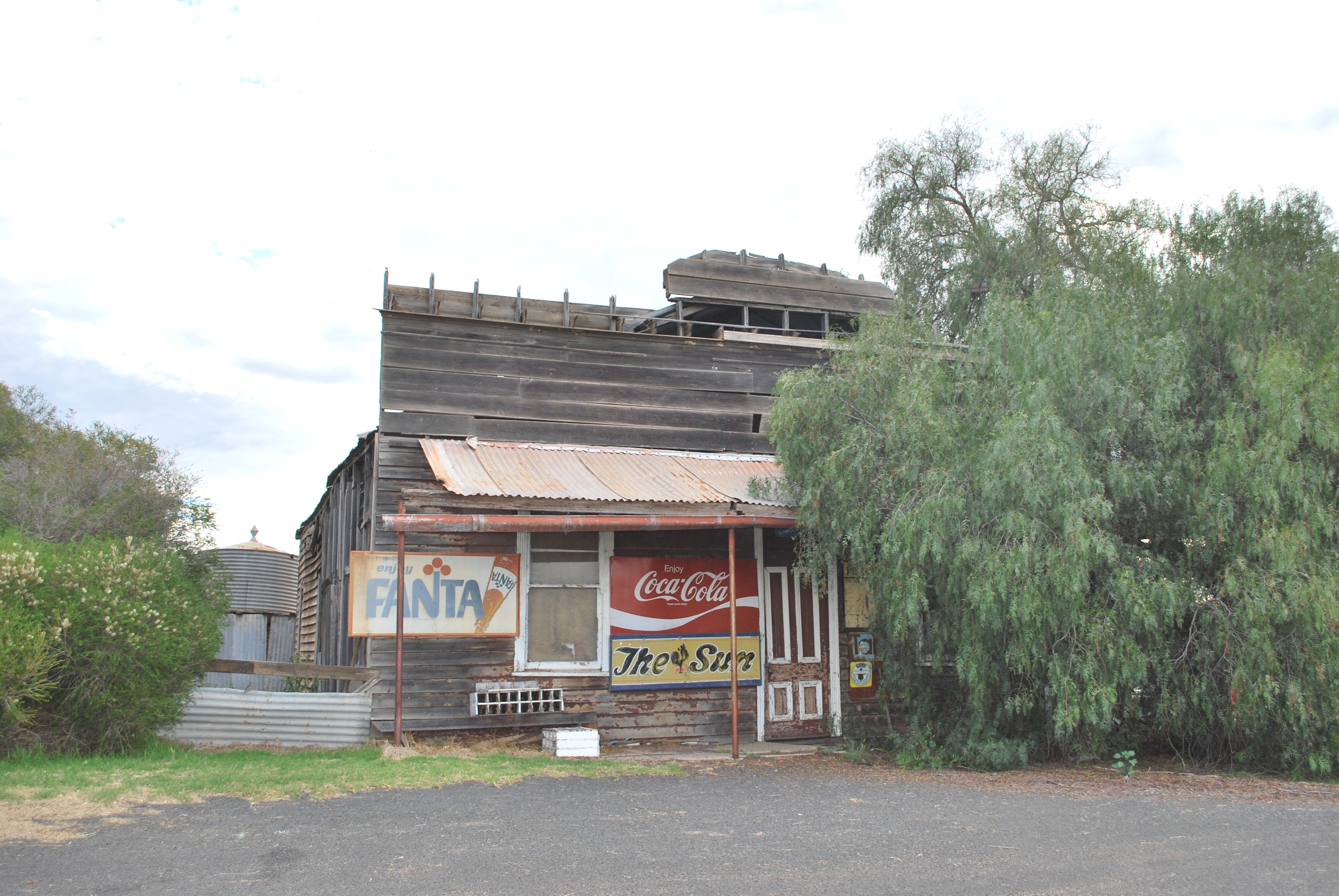
- The abandoned General store at Gymbowen

- Coordinates: 36°44′0″S 141°36′0″E
- Country: Australia
- State: Victoria
- LGA: Shire of West Wimmera
- Location: 359 km (223 mi) NW of Melbourne; 59 km (37 mi) W of Horsham; 12 km (7.5 mi) E of Goroke

Government
  - State electorate: Lowan
  - Federal division: Mallee

Population
  - Total: 52 (2016)
- Postcode: 3401

Gymbowen is a locality in the Shire of West Wimmera of Victoria, Australia. Gymbowen recorded a population of 52 at the 2016 census.

== History ==
The date and establishment of Gymbowen is unknown, however the local school was opened in 1891 and the local hotel possibly earlier. The Post office was opened in 1882 and the 1891-92 post office directory lists the following residents:

Name	Occupation
Ah Ming, Charles	Carpenter
Carter, Esther	Teacher
Glancy, Mary	Teacher
Keeping, John	Blacksmith
Knight, William	Storekeeper
Lang, George	Blacksmith
O’Donnell Patrick	Blacksmith
Shannon, James	Blacksmith

Gymbowen served as a coach changing stage and as the railway reached there by 1894 until it closed in 1986. The Gymbowen hotel was a widely patronized place of refreshment, and it is said that many stories should have been preserved for posterity.

Gymbowen was the second post office in the district and the oldest survivor having opened on 1 June 1882 under the management of Mr. J. Houston. The annual postal allowance was 6 pounds (A$13.9). William H. Knight conducted the office in conjunction with the general store for many years; Leo Knight was appointed assistant on 11 December 1922 and postmaster on 1 December 1938.

The post office was transferred to Arthur Henry on 21 November 1946 and following his death on 13 December 1965, to Mrs. Margaret Fish.

== School ==
The Gymbowen School first opened on 27 March 1881. The school started with 8 boys and 10 girls. The school closed on August 31, 1951, with the students transferred to Goroke Consolidated School or, as it is now known, Goroke P-12 College. The school building was relocated to South Nurcoung and used as a woolshed for AHK (Jimmy) Buffham. The building was located very close to the South Nurcoung State School (Marcia Buffham was the teacher). The building was transported with a bullock team by a Mr Raggertey from Horsham. Other small schools were moved to Goroke to provide early accommodation at the Goroke combined school. These are some of the teachers that taught at this school: Young, Clancy, Carter, Clarke, Glenning, Beardsley, Hogan, Canty, Meehan, Trelfel, E Sharpe, J Hedigan, Brown, M Davies, K Makie, M Dudt, Lanrigan, L Wurfell, N Belcher, M Murphy, N tink, J Scott, Betts, Bryant, K Jellett, Messer, J Houston, J Clark, R greening, Claringbold, R Williams, Skidmore, L Pascoe, P Bright, L Prime, J Gleesner, J Lynch, W Passmore, F Duffy, J Roberts, M Dankett, Elmore and Jefferies.

== Sports ==
In 1940 Gymbowen, Goroke and Minimay combined to enter Tatiara League. During World War II social matches were played between Edenhope, Goroke, Apsley, and Minimay with proceeds to patriotic funds.
