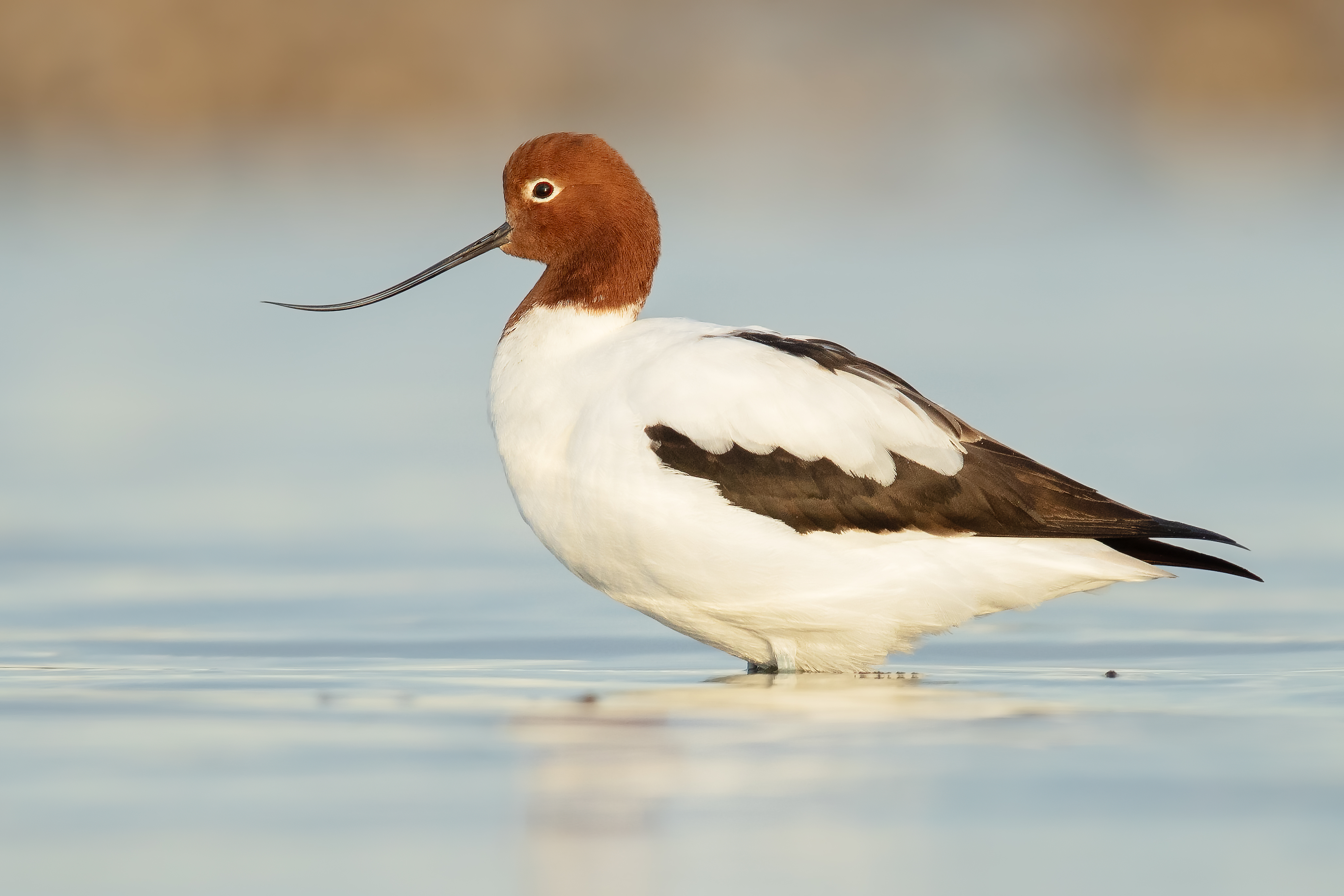

Conservation status
- Least Concern (IUCN 3.1)

Scientific classification
- Kingdom: Animalia
- Phylum: Chordata
- Class: Aves
- Order: Charadriiformes
- Family: Recurvirostridae
- Genus: Recurvirostra
- Species: R. novaehollandiae

Binomial name
- Recurvirostra novaehollandiae Vieillot, 1816

Synonyms
- Recurvirostra rubricollis Temminck, 1820

= Red-necked avocet =

Species of bird

The red-necked avocet (Recurvirostra novaehollandiae) also known as the Australian avocet, cobbler, cobbler's awl, and painted lady, is a wader of the family Recurvirostridae that is endemic to Australia and is fairly common and widespread throughout, except for the north and north east coastal areas of the country. Closely related to the stilts, it shares their fragile slender elegance, however the deep red head and neck distinguish them. It appeared on a 13 cent postage stamp in 1966.

== Taxonomy ==
The French naturalist Louis Pierre Vieillot described the red-necked avocet in 1816, and it still bears its original name. It is one of four species of avocet that make up the genus Recurvirostra. A 2004 study combining genetics and morphology showed that it was the sister taxon to a lineage that gave rise to the Andean and American avocets.

== Description ==
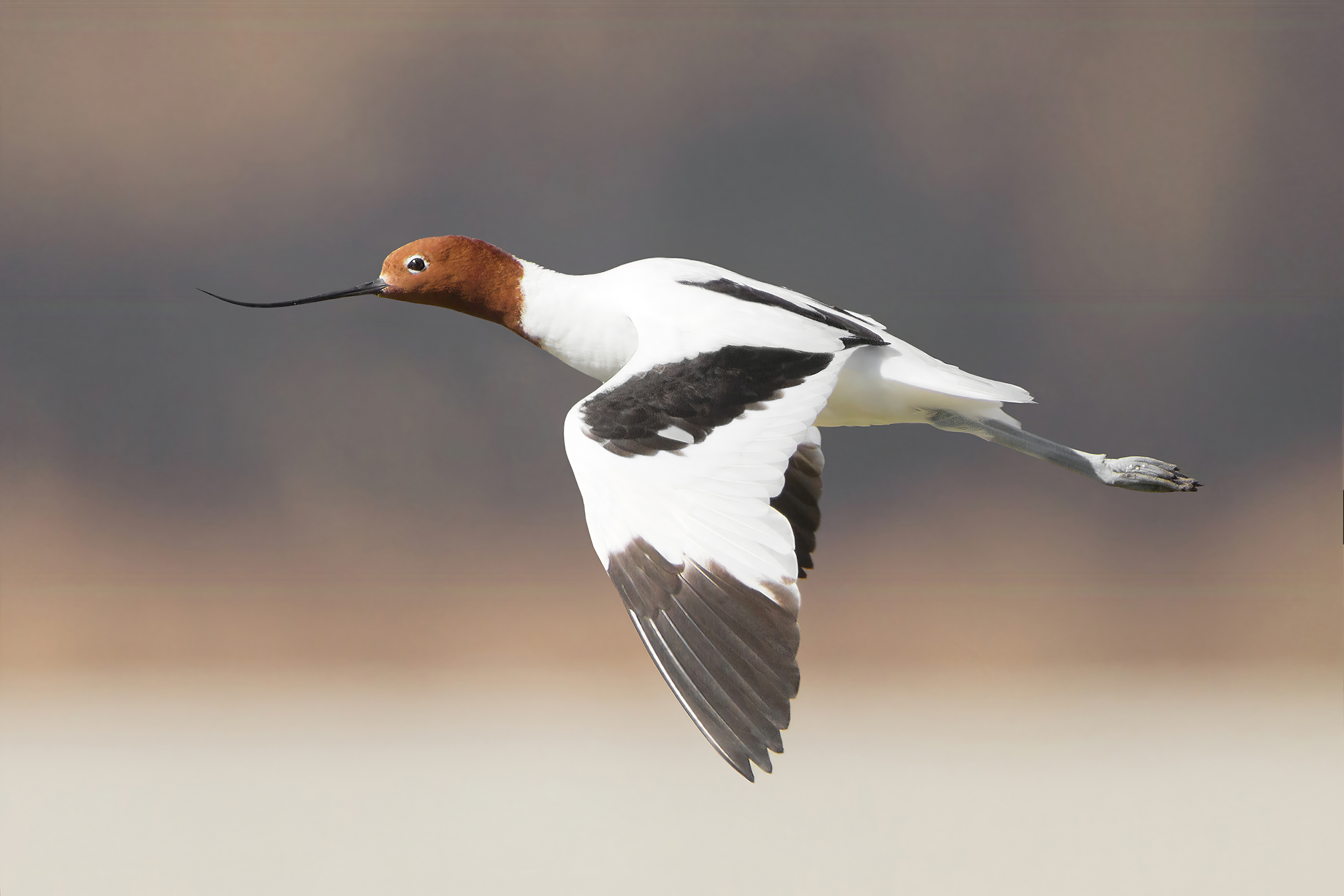
Lake Joondalup, Western Australia

The distinguishing feature of the red-necked avocet, and all avocet species, is the distinctive upcurved bill that is used for skimming the surface of water to catch small invertebrates. The adult's head and neck is a rich chestnut brown in colour (from which it derives its name) with a narrow white eye ring and a red-brown iris. The secondary coverts and primary feathers are black and the remainder of the plumage is white. The bill is black and the legs are a pale grey-blue. Both male and female are similar in colouring and size; neither is there seasonal variation in appearance. Juveniles are similar in appearance and difficult to identify once post-juvenile moult has started, the head is sometimes paler and browner that the adults. An average adult red-necked avocet measures 43–45 cm (17–17.5 in) from head to tail, and has a total wingspan of around 75 cm (29.5 in), wing length 22.4–23 cm, tail length 7.9–8.8 cm, and bill length of 8.2–9.5 cm, and weighs around 310 g.

The call has been described as a yapping, and flocks in flight making a sound reminiscent of dogs barking.

== Distribution and habitat ==
Like many waterbirds found in Australia, the red-necked avocet is highly nomadic, due mainly to the high variation in rainfall, moving around the continent in search of suitable habitat. It has a very wide range in Australia but is comparatively rare on the northern and north-eastern coasts. The birds have a preference for salt or brackish water and are generally found in shallow wetland areas that are either fresh or salt, or on estuarine mudflats. The species is rare in Tasmania and an occasional vagrant to New Zealand.

== Ecology and behaviour ==
Mainly found in loose colonies during the breeding season, the red-necked avocet disperses in small flocks for the rest of the year. Social in all activities and during all seasons, they are known to associate happily with stilts. Pre-mating courtship involves bill crossing and bowing dances with the female indicating their readiness to mate by crouching low with wings spread, this usually occurs in shallow water. Each pair defends their nesting territory with a range of displays and postures and will swoop repeatedly at intruders. Its voice is similar to other avocets, common calls include a fluty clear 'tuut' or 'kluut' that generally serves as a contact call with a shorter and sharper yelping notes reserved for warning calls. It can be fairly sedentary when in suitable conditions, though will quickly migrate towards coastal areas during dry weather.

== Diet and feeding ==
The diet mainly consists of small invertebrates that it catches in the shallows by sweeping its slender up curved bill from side to side through the water surface and underlying mud. As, unlike other shore birds, they swim readily, this enables them to upend in deeper water (like a duck) and continue feeding. Food consists of mainly aquatic insects and their larvae such as brine shrimp, crustaceans and also seeds. Juveniles are often limited to small insects and seeds until their bill is more developed, consuming food with a pecking action rather than the water skimming done by adults.

== Breeding and reproduction ==
In SE Queensland

The red-necked avocet nests in loose colonies, rarely large, mainly during August–November. This however is often highly variable depending on rainfall and water availability. Breeding usually takes place in the south western interior on areas of swamps and mudflats after rain, though small colonies have been documented nesting on Port Phillip Bay near Melbourne in Victoria. The nest consists of a shallow scrape that is lined with samphire or similar water vegetation. Clutch size consists of 3–4 eggs, usually 4 that are pyriform and a pale brown with some speckled sepia colouring. Eggs measure 36 by 50 mm. The eggs are arranged in a circle, with the acute ends toward the centre.

== Predators and threats ==
Due to their relatively large size, red-necked avocets have few predators. Introduced or feral animals, including red foxes or feral cats, take chicks and eggs. Climate change may reduce the number of inland breeding areas through extended drought periods. In order to avoid predators, red-necked avocets have been observed to pretend to have a broken or injured limb in order to lure predators away from vulnerable chicks.
