= Serviceton =

Town in western Victoria, Australia

- Town
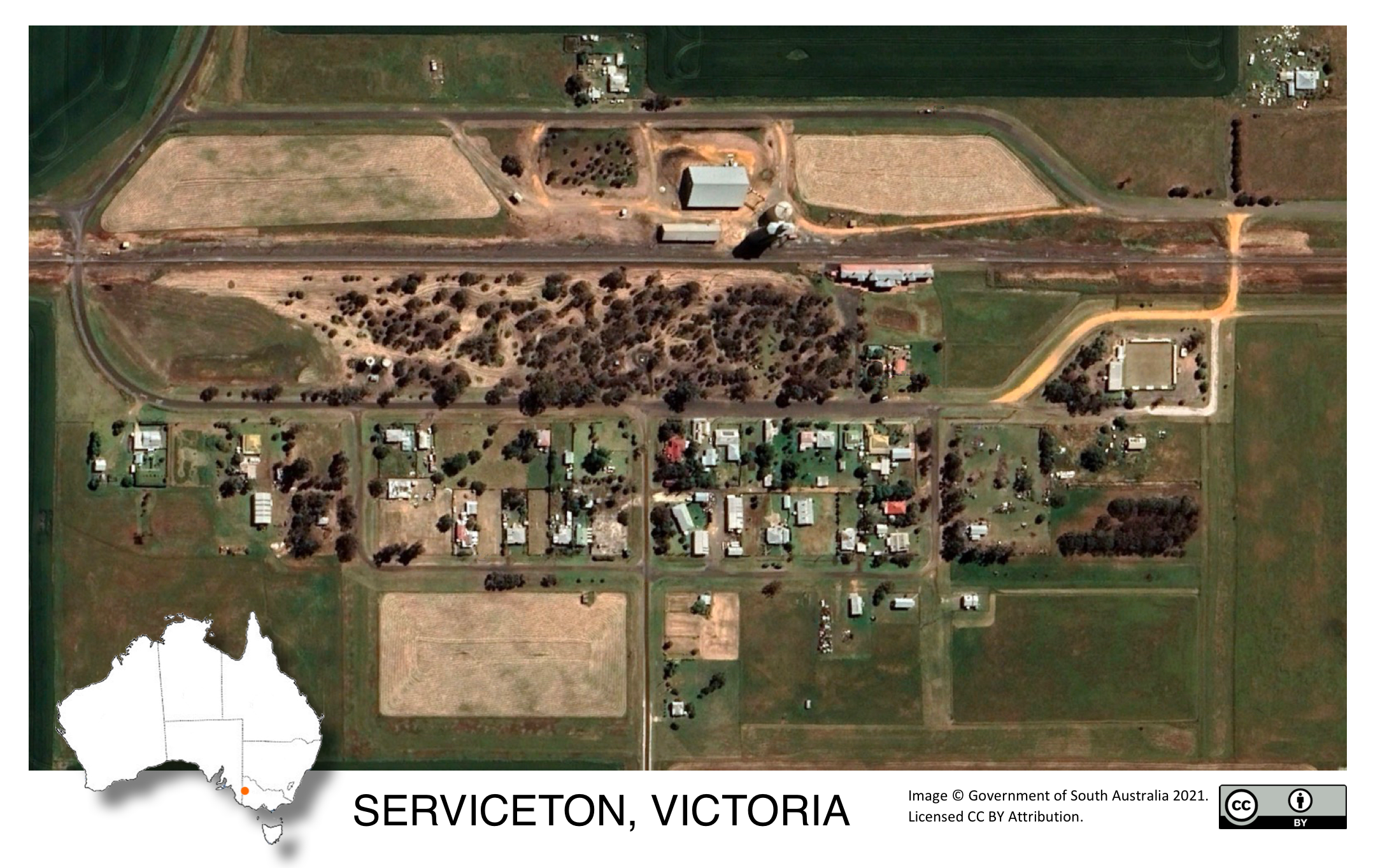
- Serviceton in 2020

- Coordinates: 36°22′32″S 140°59′17″E
- Country: Australia
- State: Victoria
- LGA: Shire of West Wimmera
- Location: 437 km (272 mi) from Melbourne; 294 km (183 mi) from Adelaide; 139 km (86 mi) from Horsham
- Established: 1887

Government
  - State electorate: Lowan
  - Federal division: Mallee
- Elevation: 121 m (397 ft)

Population
  - Total: 120 (2016)
- Postcode: 3420
- Mean max temp: 21.2 °C (70.2 °F)
- Mean min temp: 8.1 °C (46.6 °F)
- Annual rainfall: 490 mm (19 in)

Serviceton is a town in rural western Victoria, Australia. It is near the Victorian–South Australian border, 437 kilometres (272 miles) north-west of Melbourne. Named after James Service, who was Premier of Victoria in 1880 and from 1883 to 1886, it was established when the inter-colonial railway line between Adelaide and Melbourne was completed in 1887. The railway station served as the change-over point for train crews and locomotives of the Victorian Railways and South Australian Railways.

The 2016 census recorded a population in Serviceton and the surrounding area of 120; there were 77 dwellings.

The town is the subject of a Tom Waits song entitled "Town With No Cheer" from his album Swordfishtrombones.

Serviceton Post Office opened in 1886; from 1908 to 1911 it was known as Serviceton Railway Station post office. A Serviceton South office was open in 1926–1927, and Serviceton North office, on the Western Highway, operated from 1911 until 1954.

Golfers play at the course of the Serviceton Golf Club on the Western Highway.

== Border dispute ==
The eastern border of South Australia was declared in 1834 to be the meridian of the 141st degree of east longitude. In 1847, however, owing to the limitations of technology used for the first survey, markers were placed in error. Subsequently, the border was understood by both colonies to be about 2.25 miles (3.62 kilometres) west of the meridian. Nevertheless, a border was not formalised and it was reported that "a number of bad characters resort to this neutral ground, knowing that the police cannot interfere with them until the question of jurisdiction is determined." Seventy-five years of legal dispute were only resolved in 1914, with the judgement of the Judicial Committee of the Privy Council that the erroneously surveyed line was to be the legal border. Serviceton was thus placed within Victoria. Google Earth shows the border to be 1.94 miles (3.13 km) west of the 141st meridian and Serviceton 0.65 miles (1.04 km) west of the meridian.

== Railway station ==
The railway station was completed in 1889 as the point at which the Serviceton railway line of Victoria and the Adelaide-Wolseley railway line of South Australia – together comprising the Inter-colonial Railway line – joined. The station building, for which the cost was shared between the two colonies, had 15 main rooms, including a large refreshment room and two customs offices and two booking offices for the separate systems. When Australia federated in 1901, inter-state customs collection ceased, but locomotives continued to be changed until the 1980s. As of the 2010s, the building was leased by V/Line to the Shire of West Wimmera and managed by a committee elected from the local community to voluntarily operate, maintain and preserve it.

As of 2004, passenger trains, including The Overland interstate service, did not stop at the station.

== Climate ==
Climate data for Serviceton, elevation 119 m (390 ft)
Month	Jan	Feb	Mar	Apr	May	Jun	Jul	Aug	Sep	Oct	Nov	Dec	Year
Record high °C (°F)	45.1 (113.2)	43.7 (110.7)	39.1 (102.4)	34.3 (93.7)	27.4 (81.3)	23.9 (75.0)	18.8 (65.8)	26.5 (79.7)	32.8 (91.0)	36.8 (98.2)	41.7 (107.1)	40.6 (105.1)	45.1 (113.2)
Mean daily maximum °C (°F)	29.3 (84.7)	28.6 (83.5)	25.9 (78.6)	21.2 (70.2)	17.0 (62.6)	14.1 (57.4)	13.5 (56.3)	15.0 (59.0)	17.5 (63.5)	20.6 (69.1)	24.1 (75.4)	27.0 (80.6)	21.2 (70.2)
Mean daily minimum °C (°F)	12.2 (54.0)	12.3 (54.1)	10.7 (51.3)	8.5 (47.3)	6.6 (43.9)	4.9 (40.8)	4.4 (39.9)	4.6 (40.3)	5.8 (42.4)	7.3 (45.1)	9.1 (48.4)	11.0 (51.8)	8.1 (46.6)
Record low °C (°F)	4.0 (39.2)	4.6 (40.3)	1.3 (34.3)	0.2 (32.4)	−2.1 (28.2)	−4.9 (23.2)	−3.5 (25.7)	−3.4 (25.9)	−3.1 (26.4)	−3.8 (25.2)	1.2 (34.2)	2.9 (37.2)	−4.9 (23.2)
Average rainfall mm (inches)	18.5 (0.73)	22.3 (0.88)	22.0 (0.87)	38.9 (1.53)	54.7 (2.15)	58.4 (2.30)	59.0 (2.32)	60.8 (2.39)	53.3 (2.10)	46.4 (1.83)	33.2 (1.31)	28.5 (1.12)	496.7 (19.56)
Average rainy days (≥ 1.0 mm)	2.7	3.0	3.1	6.0	8.7	10.1	11.2	11.6	9.1	8.0	5.5	4.0	83
Source: Australian Bureau of Meteorology
