= Harrow, Victoria =

- Town
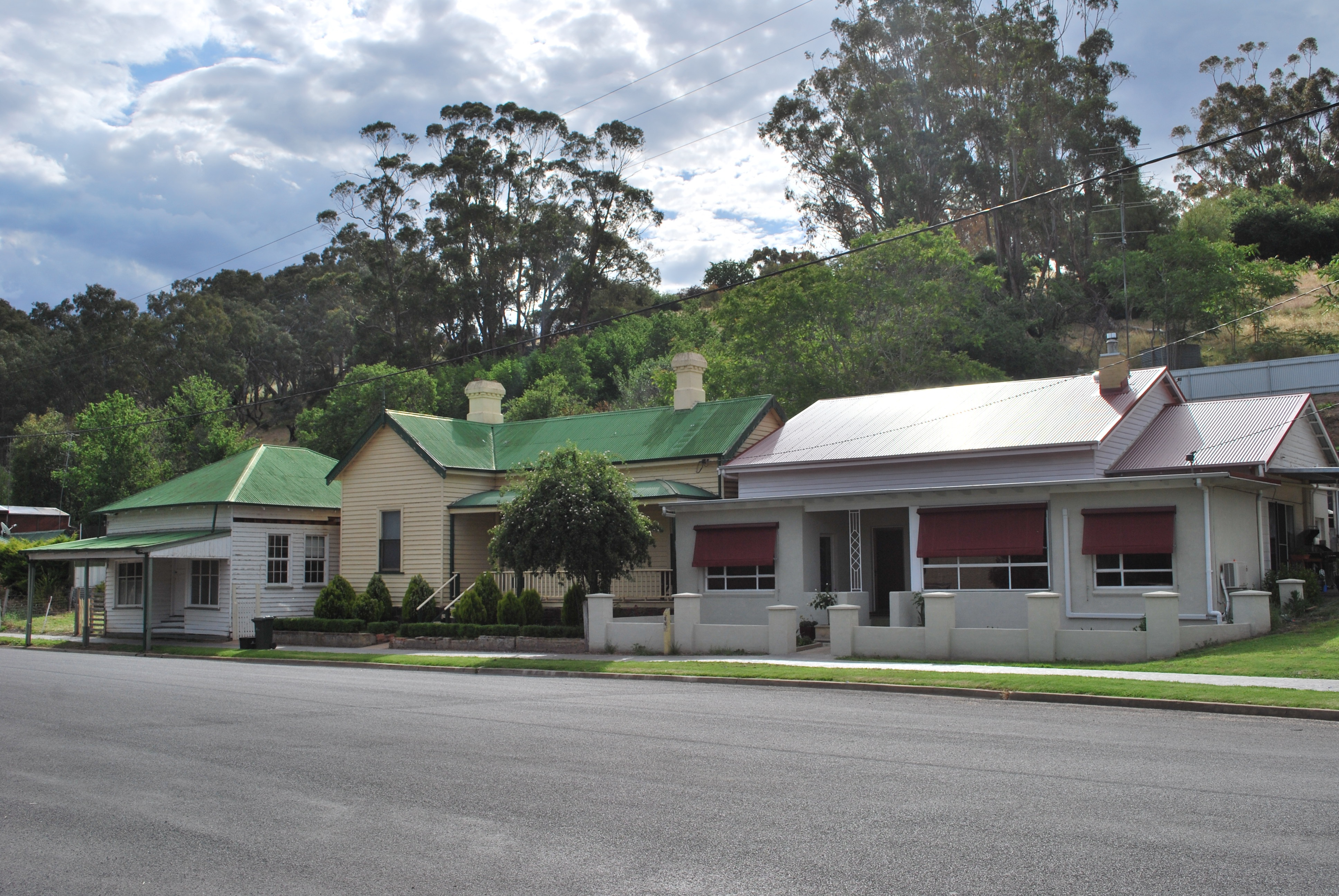
- Houses in Harrow

- Coordinates: 37°10′0″S 141°36′0″E
- Country: Australia
- State: Victoria
- LGA: Shire of West Wimmera
- Location: 391 km (243 mi) from Melbourne; 89 km (55 mi) from Horsham; 68 km (42 mi) from Casterton

Government
  - State electorate: Lowan
  - Federal division: Wannon, Mallee

Population
  - Total: 184 (2021 census)
- Postcode: 3317

Harrow is a town in the Wimmera region of western Victoria, Australia. The town is located in the Shire of West Wimmera local government area, 391 kilometres north west of the state capital Melbourne, overlooking the Glenelg River valley. At the 2021 Australian census, Harrow and the surrounding area had a population of 184 with a median age of 49.

The first European explorer of the area was Thomas Mitchell and a monument marks the spot where he crossed the Glenelg River. The region that included the later Harrow townsite was first taken up as a sheep station by William Rickets in August 1840. A store was built on the site of Harrow in March 1848 by R. H. Evans near the pre-existing Foresters Inn. There is no record that the Forester's Inn was ever licensed. A Post Office was announced on 16 March 1849 to be operated out of Mr R. H. Evans store. Township blocks at Harrow were auctioned at Portland in October 1853 amongst allegations that the owner of Clunie station bought them all in an effort to prevent occupation of the town

Harrow was an early inland settlement in Victoria but was preceded by Kilmore, Gisborne and Carlsruhe in 1837. Harrow also was proclaimed a town early. Benalla and Wangaratta had been proclaimed towns on 7 and 11 April 1849 respectively. Buninyong, Winchelsea, Portarlington, Longwood, Avenel, Cavendish, Euroa and Gisborne had been proclaimed towns on the same day, 27 June 1851 The Post Office opened on 1 March 1849 as Upper Glenelg (Harrow from 1854). At its peak, the town included a range of shops and services including two hotels. Harrow is the burial place of Unaarrimin - Johnny Mullagh, member of the Australian Aboriginal cricket team, the first Australian cricket team to tour England. He also represented the Victorian cricket team in first-class cricket. To tell the story of Unaarrimin, and the times in which he lived, Harrow has built The Johnny Mullagh / Harrow Discovery Centre. To enhance the cricket connection, the centre now houses Australia's largest Sir Donald Bradman exhibition.

The Marsh clan is one of the oldest existing families from this region. Les and James Marsh were the first settlers in the 1830s and their homestead is still viewable to this day.

The Harrow Court of Petty Sessions closed on 1 February 1966. The former courthouse was subsequently acquired by the Harrow branch of the Returned and Services League.

In recent years, there has been a drift away from Harrow to larger towns in the region. In an effort to counteract this, Harrow has pioneered several popular events such as the regular "Beaut Blokes" events. The event was established to offset a perceived gender imbalance by introducing women from cities such as Melbourne and Geelong to single men from the district. The concept has now been picked up by other rural communities throughout Australia. A sound and light show is held regularly, retelling the history of Harrow in a humorous and interactive manner.

The town in conjunction with neighbouring township Balmoral has an Australian Rules football team competing in the Horsham & District Football League. Harrow's best known footballers were Tim Houlihan who played for the West Coast Eagles Football Club and Michael Close who played for the Brisbane Lions Football Club.

Golfers play at the course of the Harrow Golf Club on Nhill-Harrow Road.
