= Goroke, Victoria =

Goroke
- Town
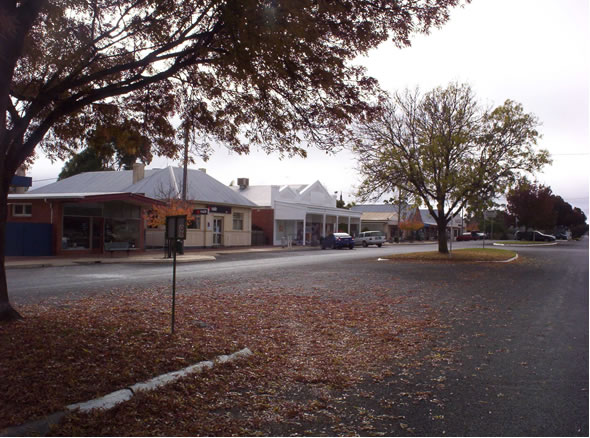
- Main street

- Coordinates: 36°43′09″S 141°28′22″E
- Country: Australia
- State: Victoria
- LGA: Shire of West Wimmera
- Location: 370 km (230 mi) NW of Melbourne; 371 km (231 mi) SE of Adelaide; 68 km (42 mi) W of Horsham; 43 km (27 mi) W of Natimuk

Government
  - State electorate: Lowan
  - Federal division: Mallee

Population
  - Total: 299 (2016 census)
- Postcode: 3412

Goroke (/ɡəˈroʊk/ gə-ROHK) is a town in the Wimmera region of Victoria. The town is located in the Shire of West Wimmera local government area, 370 kilometres (230 mi) north west of the state capital, Melbourne. At the 2016 census, Goroke recorded a population of 299.

== History ==
Named after an Aboriginal term for the Australian magpie, the town was established in 1882 as a supply centre for local selectors and by 1884 had a population of 50. Goroke Post Office opened on 1 July 1884.

Three years later, facilities in Goroke included a flour mill, two stores, a school, a mechanics' hall, a hotel and a blacksmith's. Originally connected to Kaniva and Nhill by a track through the Little Desert, in 1894, the railway reached Goroke from Natimuk until it closed in 1986.

== Description ==
The town is based around primary production, including wool growing, fat lamb and mutton production, beef cattle, cropping, forestry, wine grape production and yabby cultivation. Education is provided by a P-12 college. The local newspaper, the Goroke Free Press is published weekly. Nearby Lake Charlegrark is the venue for an annual country music festival, held on the third weekend in February.

== Education ==
The Goroke School was first opened on 28 September 1885 with only 10 boys and 10 girls; Henry H. Pearson being in charge of the 20 students. The school is now known as Goroke P-12 College with an enrolment of 78 students from prep through to year 12.

== Sports ==
The Goroke bowling club was formed in 1952 and the clubhouse was built in 1953.

In football, one of the earliest games recorded was between Natimuk and Goroke, played at Spring Hill on 13 February 1890. Goroke has played in various leagues over the years; it merged with Border Districts in 1999 to play in the Kowree-Naracoorte-Tatiara Football League.

Goroke has had many tennis teams over the years hosting its own league. The tennis club now has a senior and a junior team which play in the Kowree Tennis Association.

The Goroke Gun Club conducts several shoots each year. The main events are the Goroke show day shoot and the pre-Christmas one.

The Golf course was first laid out at the Recreation Reserve and showgrounds in the 1920s. Golf was played on the course until the war, the club was reformed in the late 1950s on the Compston property on the Natimuk Road. After a period of recess it moved to its current location on the Goroke Nhill Road in 1978, the final of the 18 sandscrape holes being officially opened in 1988.

A cycling club existed during the 1930s in Goroke but there are no records that remain.

There was a swimming club that was formed during the thirties when concrete work for a pool was undertaken. Due to earth movement the concrete cracked and was not safe for public use. The existing pool was opened in 1973 and has had several improvements including the addition of solar heating in 2008.

Cricket in Goroke was played from 1934 to 1940 in a competition between Miga Lake, Karnak, Gymbowen and two teams from Goroke. Goroke now fields one senior team in the Horsham Cricket Association.

== Environment ==
There are many small wetlands in the district, and the town lies close to the Natimuk-Douglas Wetlands Important Bird Area, so identified by BirdLife International because of its importance for a variety of waterbirds.

== Notable residents ==
- Gerald Murnane, Australian writer, moved to Goroke in December 2009

== Images ==
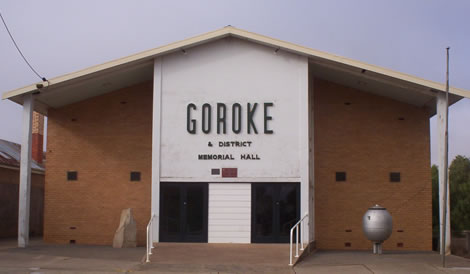
Memorial Hall

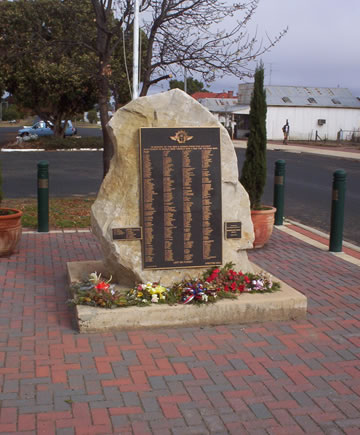
Memorial Square
