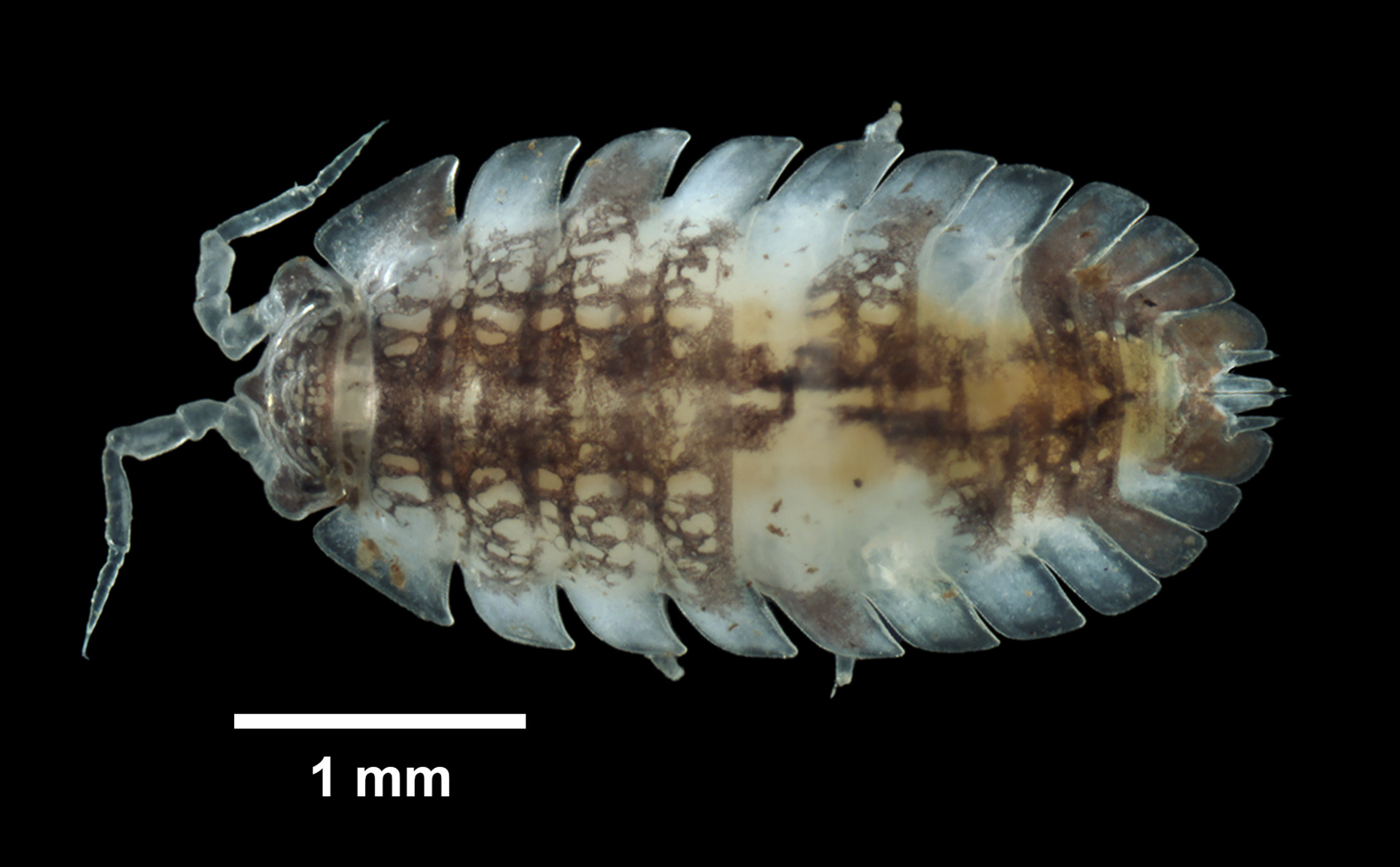
- Armadilloniscus ellipticus

Scientific classification
- Kingdom: Animalia
- Phylum: Arthropoda
- Class: Malacostraca
- Order: Isopoda
- Suborder: Oniscidea
- Parvorder: Orthogonopoda
- Section: Crinocheta
- Family: Detonidae; Budde-Lund, 1906

= Detonidae =

Family of crustaceans

Detonidae is a family of woodlice in the order Isopoda. There are at least 3 genera and more than 30 described species in Detonidae.

== Genera ==
These three genera belong to the family Detonidae:

- Armadilloniscus Uljanin, 1875
- Deto Guérin-Méneville, 1836
- Detonella Lohmander, 1927
