= Shire of Warracknabeal =

Coordinates: 36°15′S 142°25′E

- Local government area
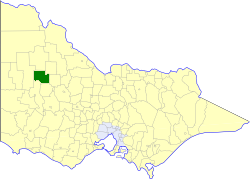
- Location in Victoria
- The Shire of Warracknabeal as at its dissolution in 1995
- Country: Australia
- State: Victoria
- Region: Wimmera
- Established: 1891
- Council seat: Warracknabeal

Area
  - Total: 1,839 km^{2} (710 sq mi)

Population
  - Total: 3,850 (1992)
  - Density: 2.094/km^{2} (5.422/sq mi)
- County: Borung
LGAs around Shire of Warracknabeal
Dimboola	Karkarooc	Birchip
Dimboola	Shire of Warracknabeal	Donald
Wimmera	Dunmunkle	Donald

The Shire of Warracknabeal was a local government area about 200 kilometres (124 mi) west-northwest of Bendigo and 60 kilometres (37 mi) north of Horsham, in western Victoria, Australia. The shire covered an area of 1,839 square kilometres (710.0 sq mi), and existed from 1891 until 1995.

== History ==
The Warracknabeal area was initially within the St Arnaud Road District, first created in 1861, which became a Shire in 1864. On 30 January 1891, its West Riding was severed to create the Shire of Borung. Several boundary changes occurred between 1891 and 1916:

- 12 May 1893 - Borung annexed the East Riding of the Shire of Dimboola, which became the West Riding.
- 22 May 1896 - Parts of Borung was annexed by the Shire of Birchip.
- 29 May 1896 - Borung lost part of its North and West Ridings, which became the Shire of Karkarooc, but gained part of the Shire of Wimmera. This addition was adjusted on 9 April 1897.
- 21 May 1916 - Borung lost parts of its East and South Ridings to the Shire of Dunmunkle, to form that Shire's North Riding.

On 7 September 1938, Borung was formally renamed Warracknabeal.

On 20 January 1995, the Shire of Warracknabeal was abolished, and along with parts of the Shires of Dunmunkle, Karkarooc and Wimmera, was merged into the newly created Shire of Yarriambiack.

== Wards ==
Warracknabeal was divided into three ridings on 10 November 1987, each of which elected three councillors:

- North West Riding
- North East Riding
- South East Riding

== Towns and localities ==
- Angip
- Areegra
- Aubrey
- Bangerang
- Batchica
- Beyal
- Boolite
- Brim
- Cannum
- Challambra
- Crymelon
- Homecroft
- Kellalac
- Lah
- Mellis
- Nyamville
- Sheep Hills
- Warracknabeal*
- Wilkur South
- Willenabrina
- Yellangip East

* Council seat.

== Population ==
Year	Population
1954	4,861
1958	5,120*
1961	4,717
1966	4,712
1971	4,218
1976	4,240
1981	3,932
1986	3,754
1991	3,659

* Estimate in the 1958 Victorian Year Book.
