= List of places of worship in Yarriambiack Shire =

This is a list of places of worship in the Shire of Yarriambiack, a local government area in the state of Victoria, Australia. The list includes active and former churches and other religious buildings representing a variety of Christian denominations and other faiths.

Christ Church, Warracknabeal

== Heritage listing status ==
Style	Status
Yes	Listed on the Victorian Heritage Register
–	Not listed

== Current places of worship ==
Current places of worship
Name	Image	Location	Denomination/ Affiliation	Heritage listing	Notes	Refs
Warracknabeal Uniting Church		Warracknabeal; 36.251739°S 142.393122°E	Uniting (formerly Methodist)	–		
Warracknabeal Baptist Church		Warracknabeal; 36.250540°S 142.392656°E	Uniting	–		
St Mary's Catholic Church, Warracknabeal		Warracknabeal; 36.253617°S 142.391655°E	Catholic	–		
Christ Church, Warracknabeal		Warracknabeal; 36.253436°S 142.392509°E	Anglican	Yes		
Our Redeemer Lutheran Church		Warracknabeal; 36.260242°S 142.395465°E	Lutheran	–		
Wheatland District Church		Warracknabeal; 36.244409°S 142.399678°E	Pentecostal (Australian Christian Churches)	–		
St Mark's Anglican Church, Areegra		Areegra; 36.266846°S 142.632468°E	Anglican	–		
St Andrew's Uniting Church		Murtoa; 36.620959°S 142.470233°E	Uniting (formerly Presbyterian)	–		
St Mary's Catholic Church, Murtoa		Murtoa; 36.616157°S 142.468262°E	Catholic	–		
St John's Lutheran Church, Murtoa		Murtoa; 36.616818°S 142.467714°E	Lutheran	–		
St John's Lutheran Church, Minyip		Minyip; 36.462370°S 142.589405°E	Yes	–		
St Patrick's Catholic Church, Minyip		Minyip; 36.463871°S 142.591063°E	Catholic	–		
Rupanyup Uniting Church		Rupanyup; 36.629677°S 142.630634°E	Uniting (formerly Methodist)	–		
St Philip's Anglican Church		Rupanyup; 36.634620°S 142.630675°E	Anglican	–		
Southern Mallee Co-operative Parish (Hopetoun Uniting Church) (Hopetoun Baptist Church)		Hopetoun; 35.726082°S 142.363642°E	Uniting, Baptist	–		
St Joseph's Catholic Church, Hopetoun		Hopetoun; 35.724333°S 142.362457°E	Catholic	–		
St John's Lutheran Church, Hopetoun		Hopetoun; 35.729151°S 142.364073°E	Lutheran	–		
St Augustine's Catholic Church		Beulah; 35.938361°S 142.418659°E	Catholic	–		
Beulah Uniting Church (Yarriambiack Creek Uniting Church)		Beulah; 35.939561°S 142.419851°E	Uniting (formerly Methodist)	–		
Brim Unity Church		Brim; 36.076339°S 142.412893°E	Uniting, Churches of Christ	–		
Central Mallee Co-operative Parish, Patchewollock		Patchewollock; 35.382079°S 142.186549°E	Anglican, Uniting (formerly Methodist)	–		
Woomelang Uniting Church		Woomelang; 35.680549°S 142.667060°E	Uniting (formerly Methodist)	–		

== Former places of worship ==
Former places of worship
Name	Image	Location	Denomination/ Affiliation	Heritage listing	Notes	Refs
Warracknabeal Presbyterian Church (St Andrew's Presbyterian Church, Warracknabeal)		Warracknabeal; 36.251012°S 142.392335°E	Presbyterian	Yes		
St Paul's Presbyterian Church		Bangerang; 36.197291°S 142.567616°E	Presbyterian (formerly Anglican)	Non-existent		
St Luke's Evangelical Lutheran Church		Murtoa; 36.622089°S 142.467722°E	Lutheran (Evangelical)	–		
Our Lady Help of Christians Catholic Church		Patchewollock; 35.380941°S 142.188420°E	Catholic	–		
Holy Trinity Anglican Church		Murtoa; 36.620446°S 142.466896°E	Anglican	–		
Minyip Uniting Church (St Andrew's Uniting Church)		Minyip; 36.458327°S 142.589644°E	Uniting (formerly Presbyterian)	–		
St Saviour's Anglican Church		Minyip; 36.460707°S 142.588481°E	Anglican	–		
St John the Baptist Catholic Church		Rupanyup; 36.626933°S 142.631613°E	Catholic	–		
St Luke's Anglican Church		Hopetoun; 35.725219°S 142.363725°E	Anglican	–		
Hopetoun Baptist Church (old)		Hopetoun; 35.725019°S 142.363033°E	Baptist	–		
Brim Methodist Church		Brim; 36.076381°S 142.413150°E	Methodist	–		
St Paul's Anglican Church, Brim		Brim; 36.075914°S 142.419493°E	Anglican	–		
Rosebery Uniting Church		Rosebery; 35.833832°S 142.422308°E	Uniting (formerly Presbyterian)	–		
Patchewollock Anglican Church (old)		Patchewollock; 35.381654°S 142.188650°E	Anglican	–		
Our Lady of the Rosary Catholic Church		Sheep Hills; 36.366299°S 142.531487°E	Catholic	Non-existent		
Crymelon Baptist Church		Watchem West; 36.176227°S 142.677956°E	Baptist	–		
Lascelles Presbyterian Church		Lascelles; 35.606437°S 142.583326°E	Presbyterian	–		

== See also ==
- List of places of worship in Golden Plains Shire
- List of places of worship in Southern Grampians Shire
- List of places of worship in the City of Greater Geelong
