= Shire of Karkarooc =

Coordinates: 35°43′S 142°21′E

- Local government area
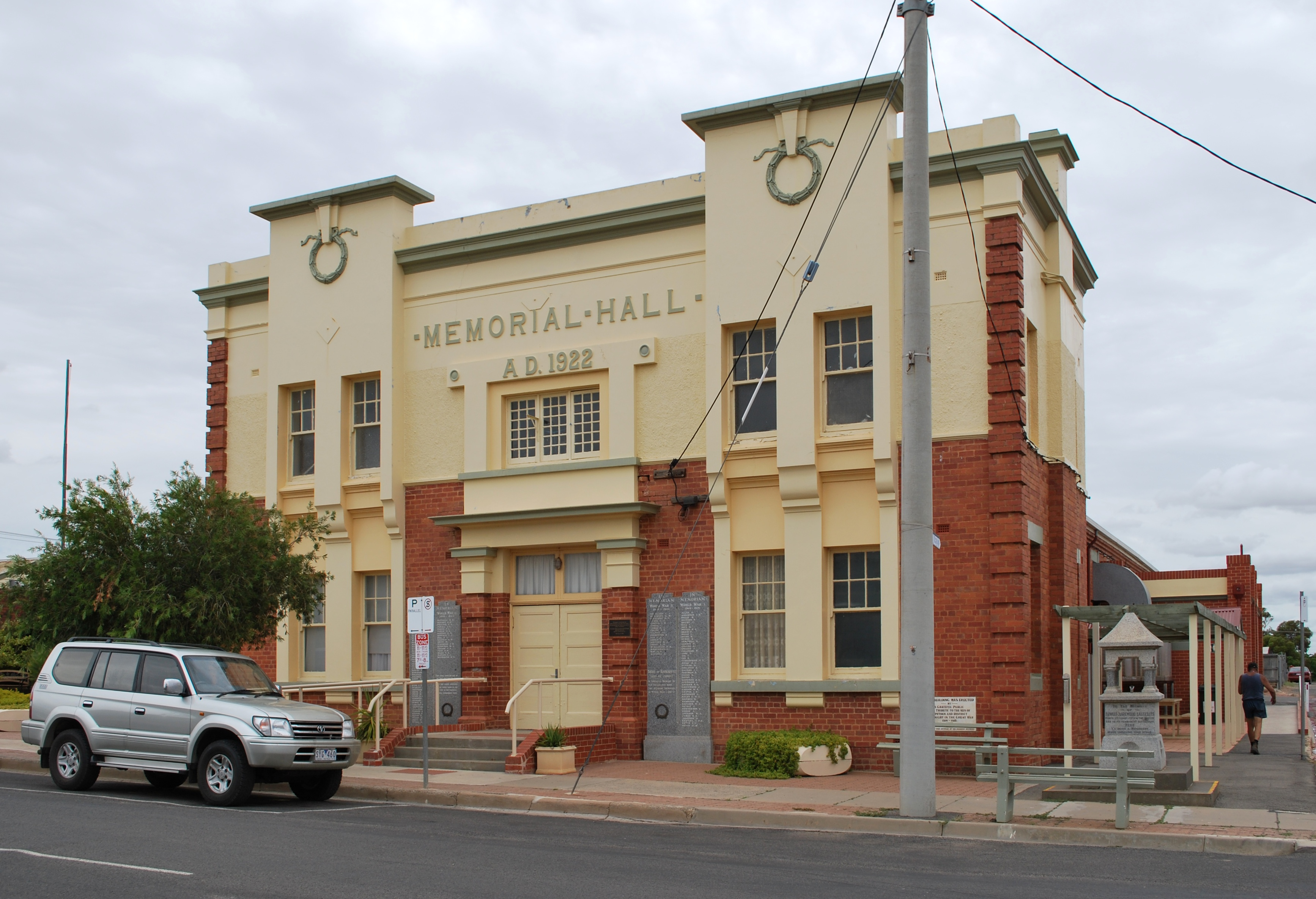
- Shire of Karkarooc Memorial Hall in Hopetoun

- The Shire of Karkarooc as at its dissolution in 1995
- Country: Australia
- State: Victoria
- Region: Mallee
- Established: 1896
- Council seat: Hopetoun

Area
  - Total: 3,719 km^{2} (1,436 sq mi)

Population
  - Total: 2,720 (1992)
  - Density: 0.7314/km^{2} (1.894/sq mi)
- County: Karkarooc
LGAs around Shire of Karkarooc
Walpeup	Walpeup	Wycheproof
Dimboola	Shire of Karkarooc	Wycheproof
Dimboola	Warracknabeal	Birchip

The Shire of Karkarooc was a local government area in northwestern Victoria, Australia. The shire covered an area of 3,719 square kilometres (1,435.9 sq mi), and existed from 1896 until 1995.

== History ==
Land in Karkarooc was originally within the St Arnaud Road District, from 1861 and the Shire of St Arnaud, from 1864, and then within the Shire of Borung, after its severance from St Arnaud. Parts of the North and West Ridings of Borung severed on 29 May 1896, to form the Shire of Karkarooc. On 29 May 1897, it annexed the northeastern part of Shire of Dimboola, and two days later annexed part of Castle Donnington. On 31 May 1906, it also annexed part of the Tyrrell Riding of the Shire of Wycheproof.

A new shire, Walpeup, was formed in western Victoria on 1 October 1911, taking in some areas of Karkarooc and sections of five other shires. Karkarooc also lost some of its West Riding to Dimboola on 14 December 1932.

On 20 January 1995, the Shire of Karkarooc was abolished, and along with parts of the Shires of Dunmunkle, Warracknabeal and Wimmera, was merged into the newly created Shire of Yarriambiack.

=== Ridings ===
At the time of dissolution, Karkarooc was not divided into ridings, and its twelve councillors represented the entire shire.

== Towns and localities ==
- Beulah
- Galaquil
- Gama
- Goyura
- Hopetoun*
- Lascelles
- Patchewollock
- Rosebery
- Speed
- Tempy
- Turriff
- Wathe
- Woomelang
- Wyperfeld
- Yaapeet
- Yarto

* Council seat.

== Population ==
Year	Population
1954	4,424
1958	4,620*
1961	4,168
1966	4,245
1971	3,729
1976	3,750
1981	3,119
1986	2,822
1991	2,610

* Estimate in the 1958 Victorian Year Book.
