= List of places on the Victorian Heritage Register in the Shire of Yarriambiack =

This is a list of places on the Victorian Heritage Register in the Shire of Yarriambiack in Victoria, Australia. The Victorian Heritage Register is maintained by the Heritage Council of Victoria.

The Victorian Heritage Register, as of 2020, lists the following 13 state-registered places within the Shire of Yarriambiack:

Place name	Place #	Location	Suburb or Town	Co-ordinates	Built	State registered	Photo
Hopetoun House	H0800	77 Evelyn Cres	Hopetoun	35.727520°S 142.366240°E	1891	27 June 1990	
Kurrajong Avenue	H2061	Comyn St	Murtoa	38.586240°S 143.737230°E	1901-02	3 March 2005	
Lake Corrong Homestead	H0642	90 Evelyn St	Hopetoun	35.728660°S 142.367790°E	c. 1854	17 December 1986	
Longerenong Homestead	H0290	897 Burnt Clay Rd	Longerenong	36.698250°S 142.409830°E	1862	9 October 1974	
Minyip railway station	H1578	Station St	Minyip	36.460180°S 142.582660°E	1889	20 August 1982	
Murtoa No. 1 Grain Store	H0791	1465 Wimmera Hwy	Murtoa	36.622810°S 142.478990°E	1941	14 November 1990	
Patchewollock railway station	H1583	Federation St	Patchewollock	35.383580°S 142.189830°E	1919	20 August 1982	
Railway Water Tower	H1193	Comyn St and Soldiers Ave	Murtoa	36.615180°S 142.471330°E	1885	25 July 1996	
Rupanyup railway station	H1590	Railway Reserve	Rupanyup	36.627600°S 142.632240°E	1890	20 August 1982	
Warracknabeal Police Lock-Up	H1537	31 Deveraux St	Warracknabeal	36.248810°S 142.396890°E	1873	20 August 1982	
Warracknabeal Post Office	H1737	107 Scott St	Warracknabeal	36.251100°S 142.395340°E	1906-07	20 August 1998	
Warracknabeal Town Hall	H2223	39 Scott St	Warracknabeal	36.248580°S 142.395460°E	1939-40	3 December 2009	
Wimmera Flour Mill and Silo Complex	H1011	Gibson St	Rupanyup	36.625870°S 142.636980°E	1906	14 September 1995	
