= Bangarang (disambiguation) =

"Bangarang" is a 2012 song by Skrillex.

Bangarang may also refer to:

- Bangarang, alternative spelling of Pangerang
- "Bangarang" (Doomtree song), a 2012 song by Doomtree
- Bangarang (EP), a 2011 EP by Skrillex
- Bangarang (The Best of Stranger Cole 1962-1972), a 2003 album by Stranger Cole
- "Bangarang", a song by Pogo

== See also ==
- Bangerang, Victoria, a town in Australia
- "Bangaranga", a 2026 song by Dara
