= Shire of Dunmunkle =

Coordinates: 36°26′S 142°42′E

Shire of Dunmunkle Victoria
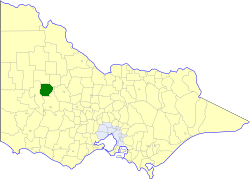
- Location in Victoria
- The Shire of Dunmunkle as at its dissolution in 1995
- Population: 2,850 (1992)
  - Density: 1.839/km^{2} (4.762/sq mi)
- Established: 1877
- Area: 1,550 km^{2} (598.5 sq mi)
- Council seat: Rupanyup
- Region: Wimmera
- County: Borung, Kara Kara
LGAs around Shire of Dunmunkle:
Wimmera	Warracknabeal	Donald
Wimmera	Shire of Dunmunkle	Kara Kara
Wimmera	Stawell	Stawell

The Shire of Dunmunkle was a local government area about 160 kilometres (99 mi) west of Bendigo and 50 kilometres (31 mi) east of Horsham, in western Victoria, Australia. The shire was bounded by the Yarriambiack Creek on the western boundary and the Richardson River on the east. The shire covered an area of 1,550 square kilometres (598.5 sq mi), and existed from 1877 until 1995.

== History ==
Dunmunkle was first incorporated as a shire on 28 September 1877. In May 1916, the shire lost part of its North Riding to the Shire of Donald, but gained parts of the South and East Ridings of the Shire of Warracknabeal.

On 20 January 1995, the Shire of Dunmunkle was abolished, and along with parts of the Shires of Karkarooc, Warracknabeal and Wimmera, was merged into the newly created Shire of Yarriambiack. The Avon-Richardson district was transferred to the newly created Shire of Northern Grampians.

== Wards ==
The Shire of Dunmunkle was divided into three wards, each of which elected three councillors:

- North Ward
- West Ward
- East Ward

== Towns and localities ==
- Ashens
- Avon Plains
- Banyena
- Burrereo
- Burrum
- Coromby
- Jackson
- Kewell
- Laen
- Lallat
- Lubeck
- Minyip
- Murtoa
- Nullan
- Raluana
- Rupanyup*
- Rupanyup South
- Wirchilleba

* Council seat.

== Population ==
Year	Population
1954	4,110
1958	4,280*
1961	4,086
1966	3,945
1971	3,544
1976	3,370
1981	3,071
1986	2,878
1991	2,683

* Estimate in the 1958 Victorian Year Book.
