= Warracknabeal Airport =

- IATA: WKB; ICAO: YWKB

Summary
- Airport type: Public
- Operator: Yarriambiack Shire Council
- Location: Warracknabeal, Victoria
- Elevation AMSL: 397 ft / 121 m
- Coordinates: 36°19′18″S 142°25′07″E

Map
- Location in Victoria

Runways
Direction	Length		Surface
Direction	m	ft	Surface
08/26	1,372	4,501	Asphalt
17/35	763	2,503	Grass
- Sources: Australian AIP and aerodrome chart

Warracknabeal Airport (IATA: WKB, ICAO: YWKB) is located about 5 nautical miles (9.3 km; 5.8 mi) south of Warracknabeal, Victoria, Australia on the Henty Highway towards Horsham. It is within the locality of Kellalac.

== See also ==
- List of airports in Victoria, Australia
