= Hopetoun Airport =

- IATA: HTU; ICAO: YHPN

Summary
- Airport type: Public
- Operator: Yarriambiack Shire Council
- Location: Hopetoun, Victoria
- Elevation AMSL: 256 ft / 78 m
- Coordinates: 35°42′54″S 142°21′36″E

Map
- Location in Victoria

Runways
Direction	Length		Surface
Direction	m	ft	Surface
01/19	1,137	3,730	Asphalt
08/26	487	1,598	Grass
- Sources: AIP

Hopetoun Airport (IATA: HTU, ICAO: YHPN) is an airport in Hopetoun, Victoria, Australia. Currently, no scheduled passenger services operate at the airport.

== See also ==
- List of airports in Victoria, Australia
