= WKB (disambiguation) =

The WKB approximation is a method for solving equations in applied mathematics.

WKB may also refer to:

- Warracknabeal Airport (IATA: WKB), in Warracknabeal, Victoria, Australia
- Well-known binary, a language for marking up vector geometry objects on a map
