= Bolangum railway line =

Former railway line in Victoria, Australia

Bolangum
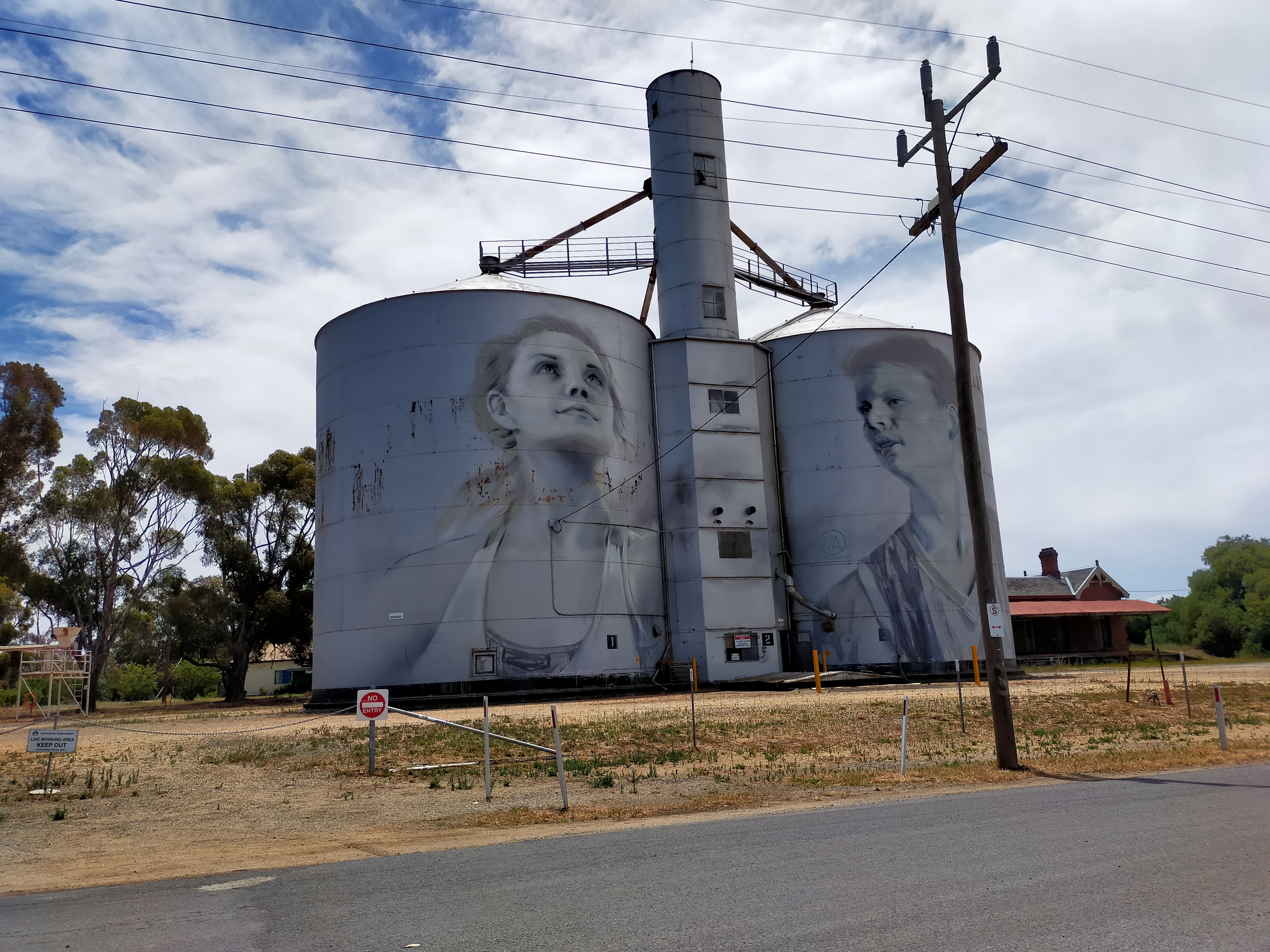
- Silo art at Rupanyup

Overview
- Status: closed, track removed
- Owner: VicTrack
- Termini: Lubeck; Bolangum
- Connecting lines: Serviceton
- Stations: 6

History
- Opened: 1 June 1887
- Closed: 28th October 1983

The Bolangum railway line was a railway line in western Victoria, Australia branching off of the Serviceton railway line at Lubeck. The line was opened in stages beginning with Lubeck to Rupanyup in June 1887 and eventually reached Bolangum in July 1927.

== History ==
The line was originally only opened from Lubeck to Rupanyup in June 1887 and a daily passenger and goods train was provided sometime after. Discussions soon began on extending the line to Marnoo. Construction to Marnoo finally began in September 1908 and was soon completed in June 1909. The line was extended once more from Marnoo to Bolangum in July 1927.

by 1940, the daily passenger and goods service had reduced to once weekly and ceased entirely sometime after.

The line was closed from Lubeck to Bolangum on Friday, 28 October 1983

== Line Guide ==
Branched from Serviceton railway line at Lubeck railway station

- Jackson
- Rupanyup
- Burrum
- Banyena
- Marnoo
- Bolangum
