= Rosebery, Victoria =

Rosebery Victoria
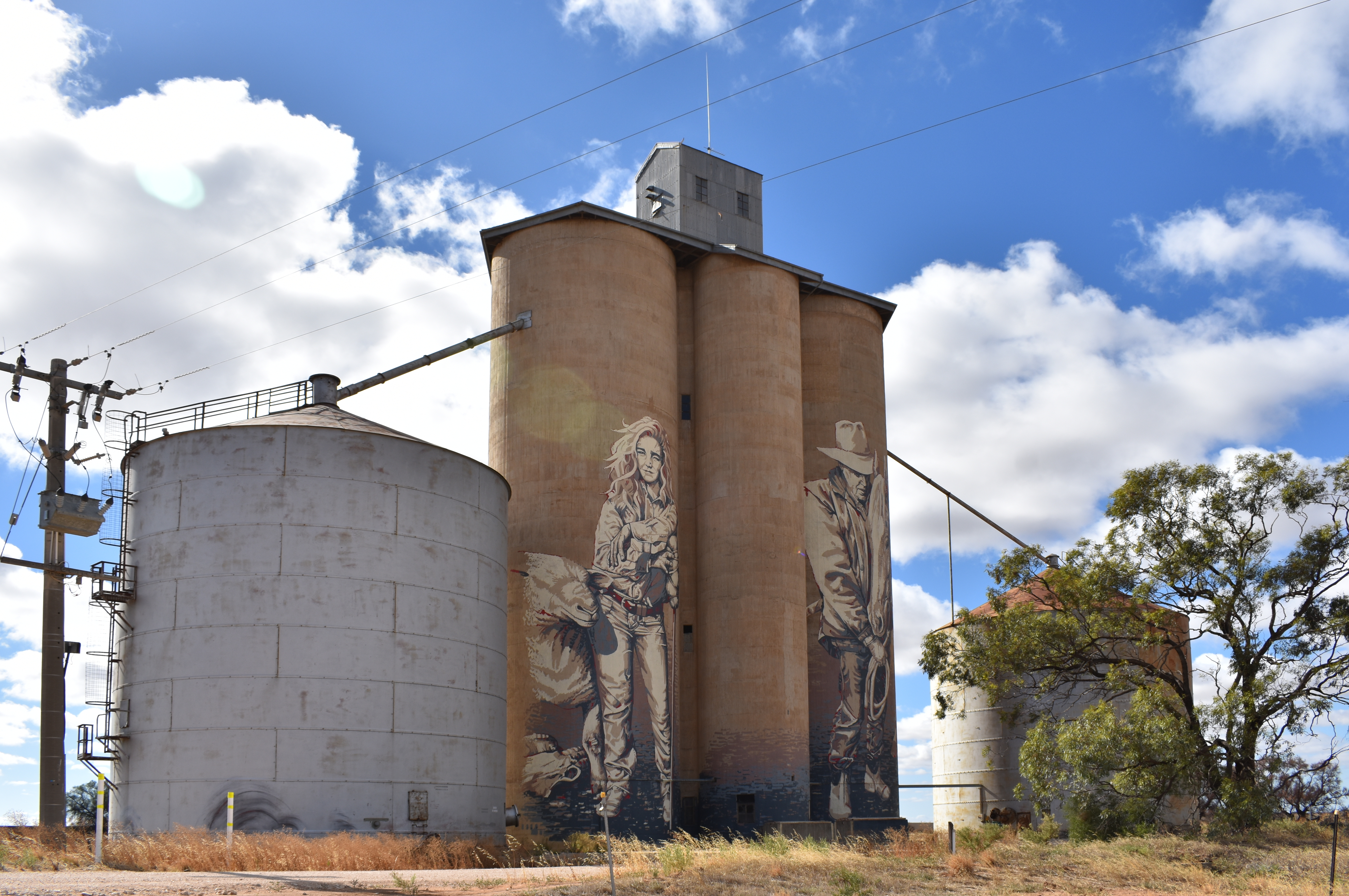
- Silo art at Rosebery, 2018

- Coordinates: 35°49′48″S 142°25′12″E
- Population: 5 (2016 census)
- Postcode(s): 3395
- Location: 371 km (231 mi) NW of Melbourne; 106 km (66 mi) N of Horsham; 49 km (30 mi) N of Warracknabeal; 15 km (9 mi) SSE of Hopetoun
- LGA(s): Shire of Yarriambiack
- State electorate(s): Mildura
- Federal division(s): Mallee

Rosebery is a locality in western Victoria, Australia. The locality is in the Shire of Yarriambiack local government area, 325 kilometres (202 mi) west north west of the state capital, Melbourne on the Henty Highway. At the 2016 census, Rosebery had a population of 5.

The town was named after Archibald Primrose, 5th Earl of Rosebery who was the British Prime Minister from 1894 to 1895.
