= Crymelon =

Crymelon Victoria
- Coordinates: 36.1540434°S 142.2676352°E
- Population: 15 (2021 census)
- Postcode(s): 3392
- Elevation: 108 m (354 ft)
- Location: 359 km (223 mi) NW of Melbourne; 68 km (42 mi) N of Horsham; 19 km (12 mi) NW of Warracknabeal
- LGA(s): Shire of Yarriambiack; Hindmarsh
- State electorate(s): Lowan
- Federal division(s): Mallee
Mean max temp	Mean min temp	Annual rainfall
22.5 °C; 73 °F	9.0 °C; 48 °F	?

Crymelon is a locality in the Shire of Yarriambiack and the Shire of Hindmarsh, Victoria, Australia. At the 2021 census, Crymelon had a population of 15.

The locality had a Baptist church, and was described as an "important Baptist stronghold". Crymelon had a tennis club and played for the Yellangip Tennis Association Trophy. Today, little of the locality remains.
