= Yaapeet =

- Town
- Coordinates: 35°46′0″S 142°3′0″E
- Country: Australia
- State: Victoria
- LGA: Shire of Yarriambiack
- Location: 417 km (259 mi) NW of Melbourne; 125 km (78 mi) N of Horsham; 30 km (19 mi) W of Hopetoun; 20 km (12 mi) N of Rainbow

Government
  - State electorate: Mildura
  - Federal division: Mallee

Population
  - Total: 75 (SAL 2021)
- Postcode: 3424

Yaapeet is a town in the Wimmera region of western Victoria, Australia. The town is located in the Shire of Yarriambiack local government area, 417 kilometres (259 mi) north west of the state capital, Melbourne.

Facilities in the town include a primary school and a recreation reserve. Wyperfeld National Park and Lake Albacutya are nearby landmarks. It is the terminus for the reopened Yaapeet railway line.

In the 2016 census the population of Yaapeet was 84. It had reduced to 75 in the 2021 census.
