= Boolite =

Boolite Victoria
- Coordinates: 36.3393012°S 142.6563446°E
- Population: 38 (SAL 2021)
- Postcode(s): 3480
- Elevation: 114 m (374 ft)
- Location: 310 km (193 mi) NW of Melbourne; 69 km (43 mi) NE of Horsham; 30 km (19 mi) SE of Warracknabeal
- LGA(s): Shire of Yarriambiack
- State electorate(s): Lowan
- Federal division(s): Mallee
Mean max temp	Mean min temp	Annual rainfall
22.5 °C; 73 °F	9 °C; 48 °F	?

Boolite is a locality near Warracknabeal in Victoria, Australia.

The locality had a hall that was used for dancing, fairs and concerts. There was a local school which had an annual picnic, and flower day. Furthermore, the school was able to raise significant funds for the war effort during the Great War. Boolite competed for the Emmett trophy in Australian football against other towns in the area. The locality also participated in cricket. Today, little of Boolite remains.
