= Aubrey, Victoria =

Aubrey
- Town
- Coordinates: 36.241305°S 142.2364837°E
- Country: Australia
- State: Victoria
- LGA: Shire of Yarriambiack
- Location: 352 km (219 mi) NW of Melbourne; 55 km (34 mi) N of Horsham; 15 km (9.3 mi) W of Warracknabeal

Government
  - State electorate: Lowan
  - Federal division: Mallee
- Elevation: 112 m (367 ft)

Population
  - Total: 0 (2021 census)
- Postcode: 3393

Aubrey is a locality west of Warracknabeal in Victoria.

== History ==
One of the earliest settlers in Aubrey was Mr. F. Rodda. He came from South Australia and purchased land in Aubrey in 1892. Water was a particular problem to the early farmers as they depended entirely on catchment by tanks. When that water ran out, it needed to be carted from a shire dam over eight kilometres away, and after the dam went dry, water needed to be sourced from 14 km away.

The Australasian describes the locality in August 1915:

In a normal season the Mallee land in the North-western Wimmera will produce wheat of a splendid sample and excellent quality. Where good farming is practised fine averages are obtained. The Aubrey district embraces some of the best country in the north-west of Victoria. It is situated between Tarranyurk, on the Dimboola-Rainbow railway line, and Warracknabeal, which lies on the Murtoa-Hopetoun line. It embraces a large area of land of uniform character, the greater part of which is devoted to cereal growing. The soil is composed of grey and chocolate clay loam of varying depths. Generally speaking, the clay is found close to the surface. The annual rainfall is about 15in., which, if it occurs at the right season of the year, is sufficient to mature payable crops.

The locality had a local hall which was in the locality since at least 1905.
