= Kewell, Victoria =

Kewell
- Town
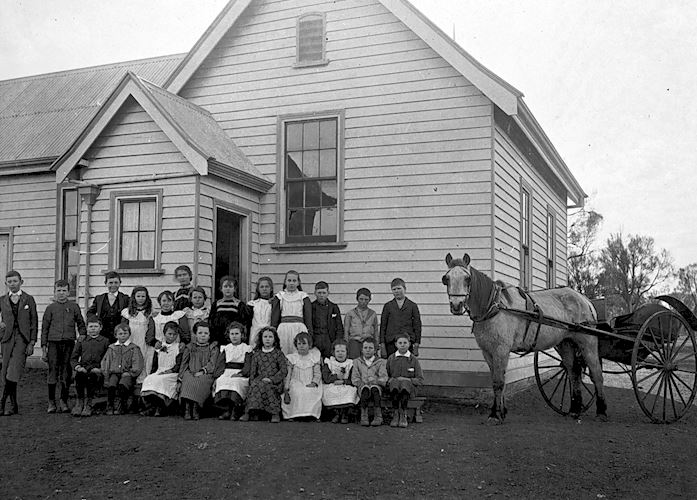
- Pupils and their teacher in front of the Kewell State School in 1902

- Coordinates: 36.5157939°S 142.4199081°E
- Country: Australia
- State: Victoria
- LGA: Shire of Yarriambiack
- Location: 314 km (195 mi) NW of Melbourne; 36 km (22 mi) NE of Horsham; 31.5 km (19.6 mi) S of Warracknabeal

Government
  - State electorate: Lowan
  - Federal division: Mallee
- Elevation: 129 m (423 ft)

Population
  - Total: 57 (2021 census)
- Postcode: 3390
- Mean max temp: 24.1 °C (75.4 °F)
- Mean min temp: 9.0 °C (48.2 °F)

Kewell is a locality in the Shire of Yarriambiack and the Rural City of Horsham, Victoria, Australia. At the 2021 census, Kewell had a population of 57.

== History ==
Kewell was named after a pastoral run of John and Alexander Wilson on the Yarriambiack Creek in 1845. The origin of "Kewell" is believed to be an Aboriginal word describing the seeds of the Carpobrotus plant.

In 1887 the centre of the locality had a post office, two hotels and two stores. The locality was divided into Kewell East and Kewell, with Kewell East being described as the centre of town.

In 1897, a tornado ripped through Kewell, causing the roof of the blacksmith's to blow off, and damage to "more or less every building in the place". The storm uprooted fruit trees and caused the loss of many farmers' crops.

By the 1880s there were three schools in the district. One was run by the Free Presbyterian church, Kewell's main religious affiliation. In the early 1900s the Kewell Zion Lutheran church opened and a Lutheran school was built. The other two schools were named Kewell East School, and Kewell Primary School. The Free Presbyterian school closed in 1915, and both Kewell East and the Lutheran school closed in 1947. The remaining school, Kewell, closed in 1990.

After the 1920s the district's population declined.
