= Cannum =

Cannum Victoria
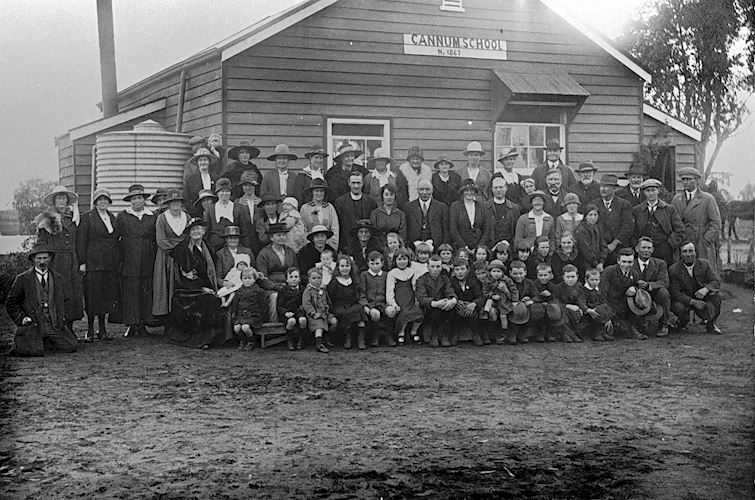
- Residents outside Cannum State School c. 1920

- Coordinates: 36.3101°S 142.2437°E
- Population: 48 (2016 census)
- Postcode(s): 3393
- Elevation: 120 m (394 ft)
- Location: 346 km (215 mi) NW of Melbourne; 46 km (29 mi) N of Horsham; 18 km (11 mi) SW of Warracknabeal
- LGA(s): Shire of Yarriambiack
- State electorate(s): Lowan
- Federal division(s): Mallee

Cannum is a locality near Warracknabeal in Victoria, Australia. Although today Cannum has no schools, it once had multiple primary schools. It had a football team until it folded in 1970.
