= Lah, Victoria =

Lah Victoria
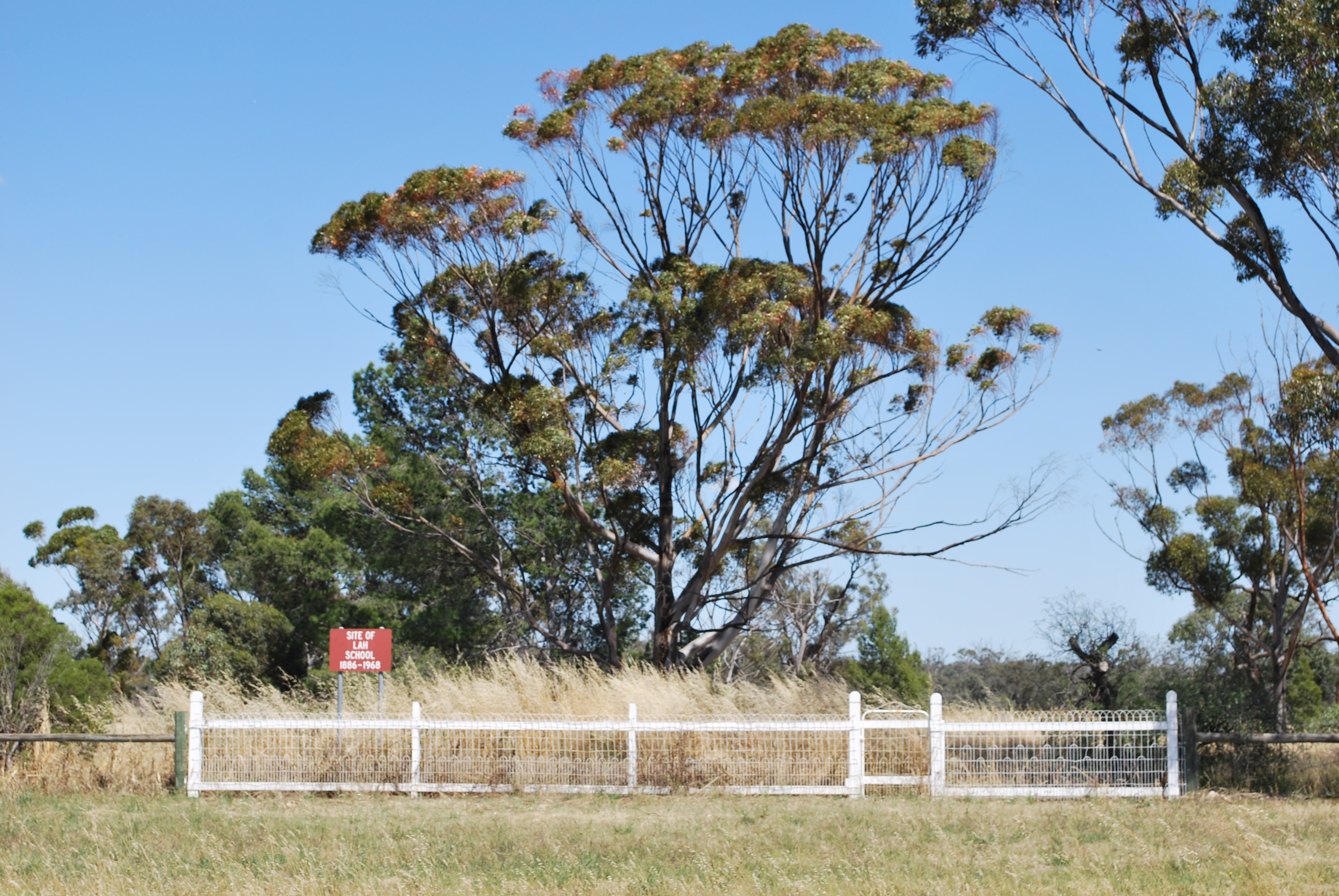
- The site of the former Lah school, 2010

- Coordinates: 36°12′0″S 142°28′0″E
- Population: 48 (2016 census)
- Postcode(s): 3393
- Elevation: 147 m (482 ft)
- Location: 353 km (219 mi) NW of Melbourne; 72 km (45 mi) N of Horsham; 16 km (10 mi) N of Warracknabeal
- LGA(s): Shire of Yarriambiack
- State electorate(s): Lowan
- Federal division(s): Mallee
| Mean max temp | Mean min temp | Annual rainfall |
| 22.5 °C; 73 °F | 9.0 °C; 48 °F | ? |

Lah (/ˈlɑː/ LAH) is a locality in the Wimmera region of Victoria, situated between Warracknabeal and Brim on the Henty Highway. At the 2016 census, Lah had a population of 48.
