= Wallup =

- Town
- Coordinates: 36°22′09″S 142°15′12″E
- Country: Australia
- State: Victoria
- LGA: Shire of Yarriambiack

Government
  - State electorate: Lowan
  - Federal division: Mallee

Population
  - Total: 28 (2021 census)
- Postcode: 3401

Wallup is a locality in the Shire of Yarriambiack, Victoria, Australia. At the 2021 census, Wallup had a population of 28. The name is derived from a Wergaia word meaning Blue-tongued lizard.
