= Laen, Victoria =

Laen Victoria
- Coordinates: 36°26′13″S 142°49′33″E
- Population: 0 (2021 census)
- Postcode(s): 3480
- LGA(s): Shire of Buloke; Shire of Yarriambiack
- State electorate(s): Mildura; Lowan
- Federal division(s): Mallee

Laen is a locality in the Shire of Buloke and the Shire of Yarriambiack, Victoria, Australia. At the 2021 census, Laen had a population of 0. Laen Bushland Reserve is located in Lean.

== History ==
Lean was named after a pastoral run established west of Donald in 1845 by Wedge and Co, a partnership that included John Helder Wedge, a Tasmanian pastoralist and member of John Batman's Port Phillip Association. The name is believed to originate from an Aboriginal word meaning "good" or "sweet." Closer settlement began in the area in 1873, with farming selections quickly occupied and a school opening in 1875 within a Presbyterian church. The district, characterized by pastoral and cereal-growing land with some dairying, included additional schools at Laen East (1883–1948) and Laen North (1876–1920). By 1910, a mechanics' institute was recorded in the area, but no commercial center developed. The original Laen school closed in 1986.
