= Willenabrina =

- Town
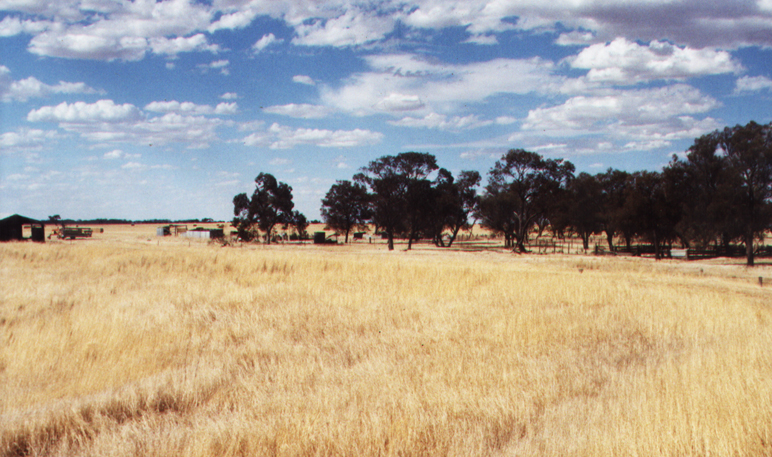
- Willenabrina

- Coordinates: 36°04′S 142°12′E
- Country: Australia
- State: Victoria
- LGA: Shire of Yarriambiack
- Location: 380 km (240 mi) NW of Melbourne; 76 km (47 mi) N of Horsham; 31 km (19 mi) NW of Warracknabeal; 27 km (17 mi) E of Jeparit

Government
  - State electorate: Lowan
  - Federal division: Mallee

Population
  - Total: 9 (2016 census)
- Postcode: 3393

Willenabrina is a locality located midway between the towns of Warracknabeal and Rainbow in the Wimmera region of northwest Victoria, Australia. The population at the 2016 census was 9.

== History ==
Originally gazetted as a railway township in the late 1880s (the Post Office opened on June 14, 1889 (closed in 1942), Willenabrina failed to develop when the railway line route beyond Warracknabeal was redirected. A few small shops, a school, a community hall, and a couple of churches, existed around the time of the First World War, along with a sports oval and tennis courts, however none of these facilities remain today.
