= Warracknabeal Cemetery =

Cemetery in Yarriambiack Shire, Victoria, Australia

- Interactive map of Warracknabeal Cemetery

Details
- Established: 1875
- Location: Warracknabeal, Victoria
- Country: Australia
- Coordinates: 36.2652°S 142.3936°E
- Website: Warracknabeal Cemetery
- Find a Grave: Warracknabeal Cemetery

Warracknabeal Cemetery is a cemetery located in the rural city of Warracknabeal, Victoria in Australia. It is a member of the Cemeteries and Cremetoria Association of Victoria, and is located at the south of the town.

== History ==
The cemetery dates back to 1875 when the first burial was performed, interring a stillborn child with the surname Mitchell from the prominent family in the Warracknabeal area.

The first person to be buried in the lawn cemetery was Neil Alexander McQuinn on 1 August 1969. The Niche wall was built in the succeeding decade. A Remembrance Wall was built in 2013. It consists of plaques with names of people who have lived, or have connections in Warracknabeal but who are not interred at the Warracknabeal Cemetery.

The cemetery is the resting place of many of the town's early pioneers and their descendants. These include members of the Bell, Hewitt, McLean, Mitchell, Müller (Miller), Smith and Symes families.

== War graves ==
The cemetery contains the Commonwealth war graves of four Australian service personnel, one from World War I and three from World War II.
