= Lawler, Victoria =

Lawler Victoria
- Coordinates: 36°21′48″S 142°45′43″E
- Population: 0 (2021 census)
- Postcode(s): 3480
- LGA(s): Shire of Buloke; Shire of Yarriambiack
- State electorate(s): Mildura; Lowan
- Federal division(s): Mallee

Lawler is a locality in the Shire of Buloke and the Shire of Yarriambiack, Victoria, Australia. At the 2021 census, Lawler had a population of 0. The name is derived from the name of a pastoral station owned by C. Duncan.
