= Kellalac =

- Town
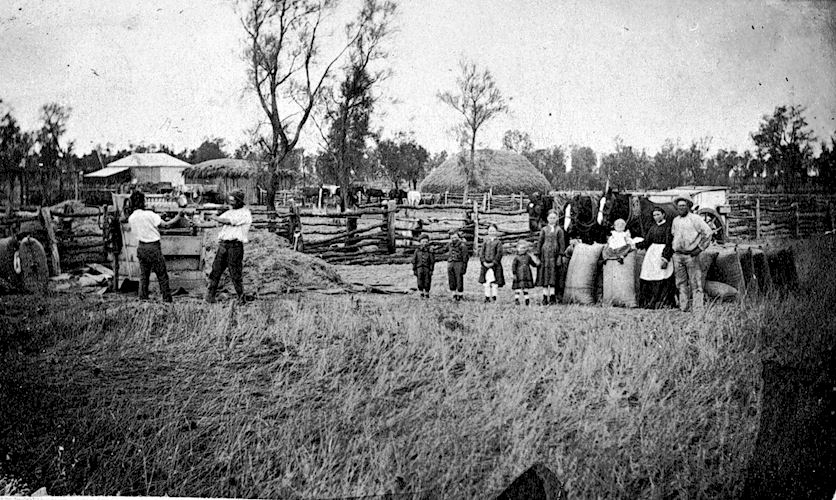
- Kellalac farm c. 1885

- Coordinates: 36.3822014°S 142.3999124°E
- Country: Australia
- State: Victoria
- LGA: Shire of Yarriambiack
- Location: 335 km (208 mi) NW of Melbourne; 42 km (26 mi) NE of Horsham; 16 km (9.9 mi) S of Warracknabeal

Government
  - State electorate: Lowan
  - Federal division: Mallee
- Elevation: 121 m (397 ft)

Population
  - Total: 17 (2016 census)
- Postcode: 3393
- Mean max temp: 22.5 °C (72.5 °F)
- Mean min temp: 9.0 °C (48.2 °F)

Kellalac is a locality near Warracknabeal in Victoria, Australia. Kellalac has a bushland reserve. The locality has a joint cricket team with Brim and Sheep Hills.
