= Areegra =

- Town
- Coordinates: 36°16′05″S 142°41′25″E
- Country: Australia
- State: Victoria
- LGA: Shire of Yarriambiack
- Location: 320 km (200 mi) NW of Melbourne; 182 km (113 mi) W of Bendigo; 75 km (47 mi) NW of Horsham; 27 km (17 mi) E of Warracknabeal

Government
  - State electorate: Lowan
  - Federal division: Mallee

Population
  - Total: 18 (SAL 2021)
- Postcode: 3480

Areegra is a locality in Victoria, Australia. It is located on Rupanyup Road in the Shire of Yarriambiack.

Areegra Post Office opened on 1 October 1880 and closed in 1981.

The population at the 2021 census was 18.
