= Sheep Hills, Victoria =

Sheep Hills Victoria
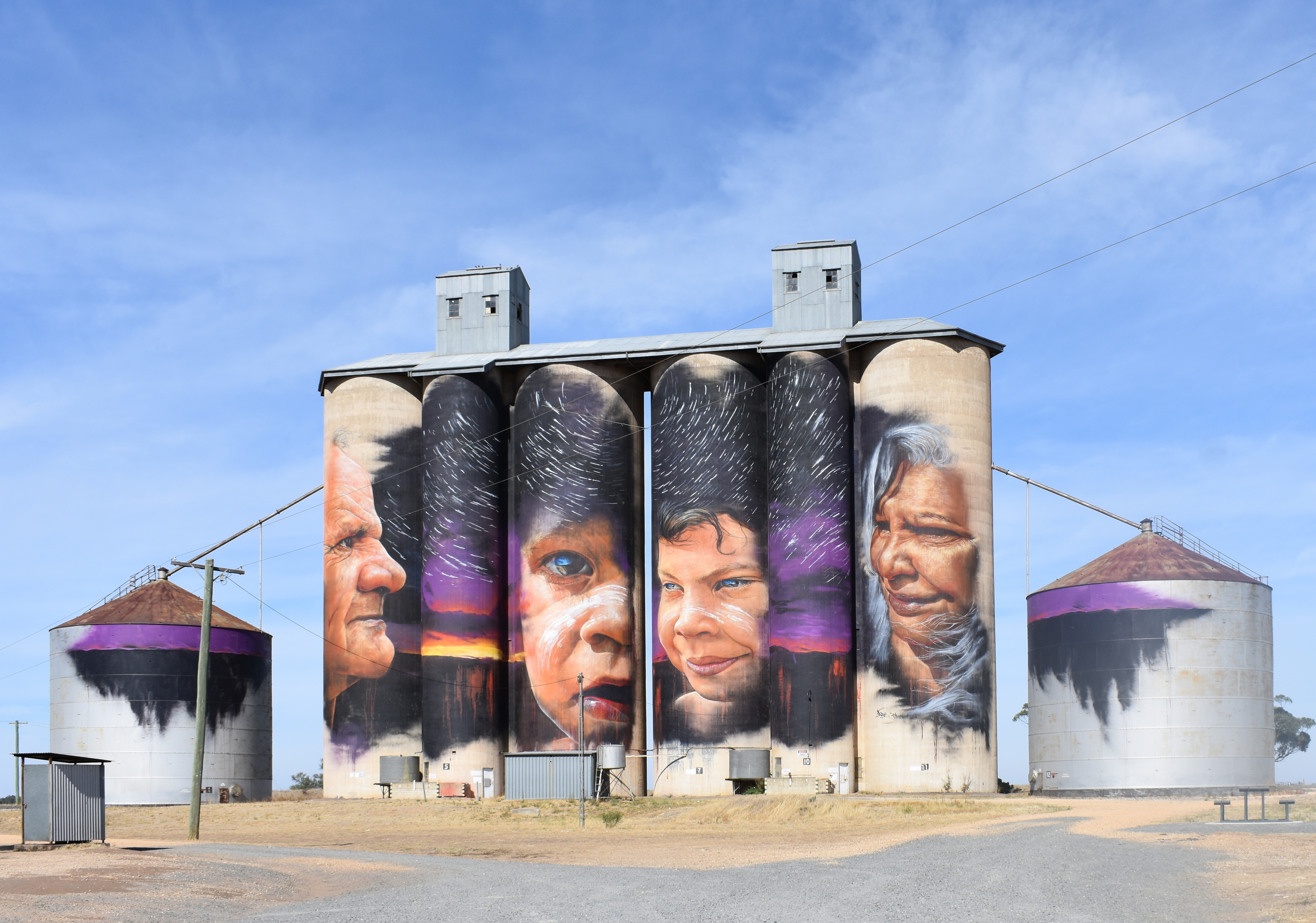
- Silo art at Sheep Hills, 2018

- Coordinates: 36.3495°S 142.5297°E
- Population: 28 (2016 census)
- Established: 1847
- Postcode(s): 3392
- Elevation: 147 m (482 ft)
- Location: 325 km (202 mi) NW of Melbourne; 64 km (40 mi) NE of Horsham; 17 km (11 mi) SE of Warracknabeal
- LGA(s): Shire of Yarriambiack
- State electorate(s): Lowan
- Federal division(s): Mallee
Mean max temp	Mean min temp	Annual rainfall
27.1 °C; 81 °F	12.0 °C; 54 °F	250.8 mm 9.9 in

Sheep Hills is a locality in the Shire of Yarriambiack, Victoria, Australia. Located in the northern Wimmera region, Sheep Hills is 271 km north-west of Melbourne. The locality is situated on the railway line south-east of Warracknabeal, north of Minyip.

The original inhabitants of the area around Sheep Hills were the Wotjobaluk, an Aboriginal Australian people.

Sheep Hills was the name of a farm operated by Archibald McMillan in 1847. The population boosted in the mid-1870s when many migrants, mostly German and Scottish, began farming in the area. The district was named Bangerang (the name of a Lutheran school) and Tarkedia (the name of a State school). In 1886 the railway from Minyip was extended to Warracknabeal, and many settled around the station, forming the township under the name of Sheep Hills.

As of 2016, Sheep Hills has a cricket, a golf and a tennis club. Also in use is the Sheep Hills Town Hall.
