= Beulah, Victoria =

Beulah
- Town
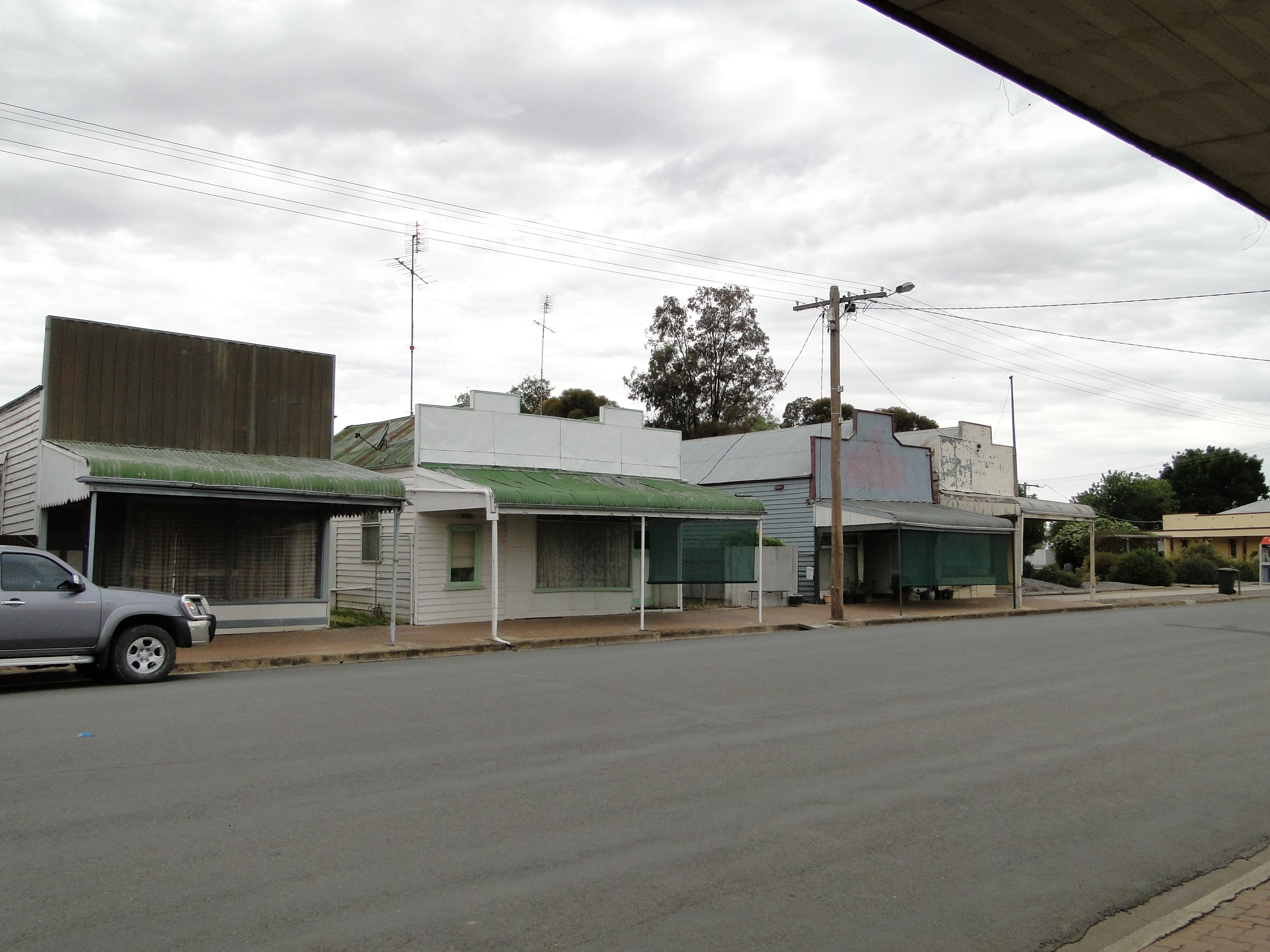
- Main street of Beulah, 2012

- Coordinates: 35°56′17″S 142°25′12″E
- Country: Australia
- State: Victoria
- LGA: Shire of Yarriambiack
- Location: 395 km (245 mi) NW of Melbourne; 219 km (136 mi) S of Mildura; 38 km (24 mi) north of Warracknabeal; 94 km (58 mi) north of Horsham

Government
  - State electorate: Mildura
  - Federal division: Mallee
- Elevation: 100 m (330 ft)

Population
  - Total: 329 (2016 census)
- Postcode: 3395
- Mean max temp: 22.4 °C (72.3 °F)
- Mean min temp: 8.5 °C (47.3 °F)
- Annual rainfall: 375.4 mm (14.78 in)

Beulah is a town in the southern Mallee region of Victoria, Australia. The town is in the Shire of Yarriambiack local government area, 395 kilometres north-west of the state capital, Melbourne. At the 2016 census, Beulah had a population of 329.

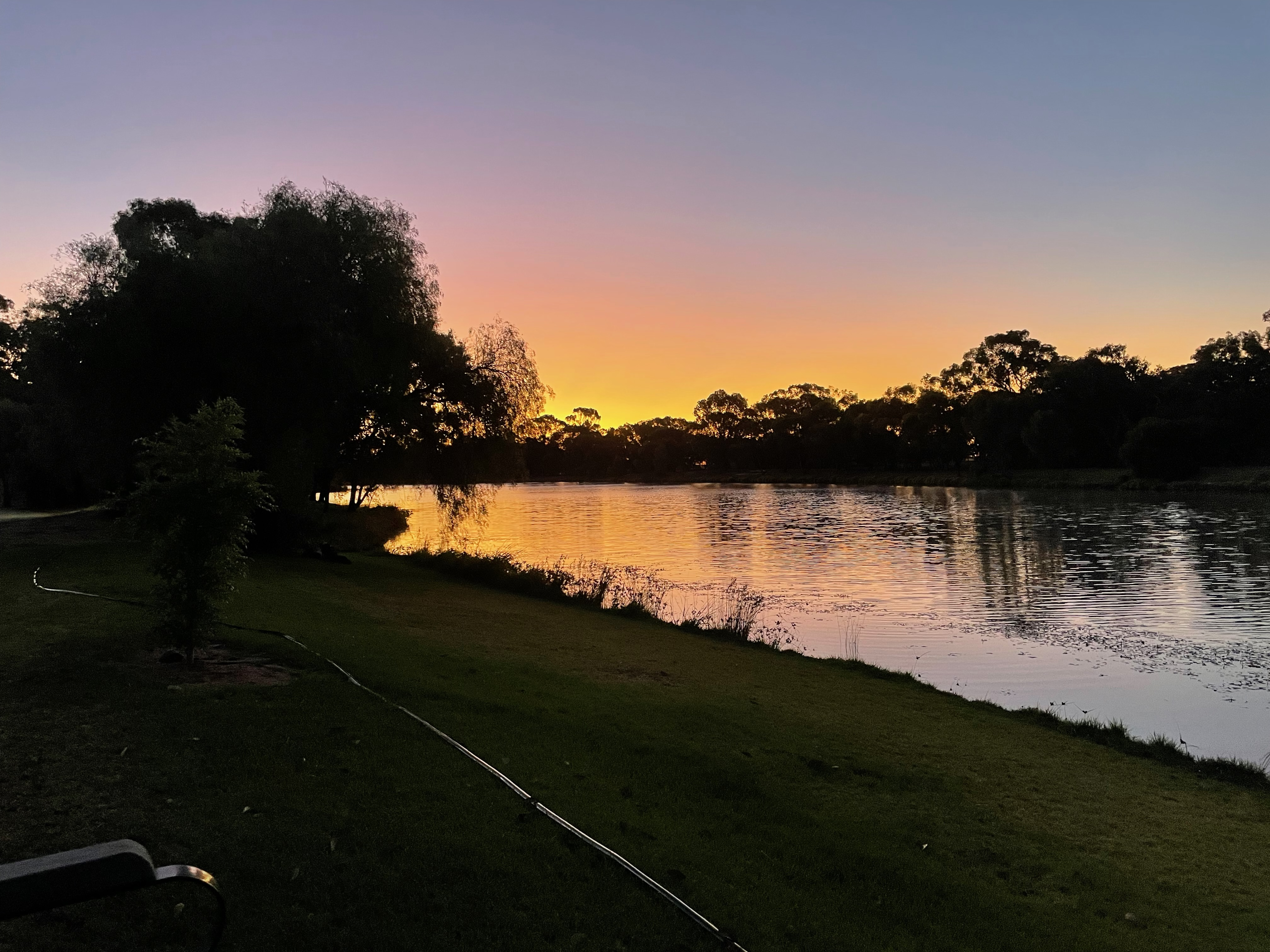
Sunset at the Beulah Caravan Park on the Yarriambiack Creek

== History ==
The town's name is taken from the Book of Isaiah, 62:4. In some English translations, the word is given as "married" or "inhabited".

Beulah was established on land that was once part of Brim station. Closer settlement began in the 1880s and the town site was proclaimed in 1891. A post office opened on May 6, 1891, and the railway from Warracknabeal opened on 5 January 1893. The line to Hopetoun opened on 6 March 1894. The town claims to be the closest to the rabbit-proof fence, established in the first decade of the 20th century to prevent the incursion of rabbit plagues.

Beulah was the location for the fictional town Kiewarra in the 2019 film The Dry, starring Eric Bana.

== Climate ==
Climate data for Beulah, elevation 89 m (292 ft)
Month	Jan	Feb	Mar	Apr	May	Jun	Jul	Aug	Sep	Oct	Nov	Dec	Year
Record high °C (°F)	46.7 (116.1)	44.3 (111.7)	40.4 (104.7)	35.0 (95.0)	27.8 (82.0)	24.4 (75.9)	26.5 (79.7)	27.7 (81.9)	34.2 (93.6)	38.3 (100.9)	42.2 (108.0)	44.0 (111.2)	46.7 (116.1)
Mean daily maximum °C (°F)	30.9 (87.6)	30.4 (86.7)	27.2 (81.0)	22.2 (72.0)	17.6 (63.7)	14.5 (58.1)	13.9 (57.0)	15.6 (60.1)	18.6 (65.5)	22.3 (72.1)	26.1 (79.0)	29.0 (84.2)	22.4 (72.3)
Mean daily minimum °C (°F)	13.7 (56.7)	13.9 (57.0)	11.7 (53.1)	8.7 (47.7)	6.3 (43.3)	4.3 (39.7)	3.6 (38.5)	4.2 (39.6)	5.6 (42.1)	7.5 (45.5)	9.9 (49.8)	12.2 (54.0)	8.5 (47.3)
Record low °C (°F)	4.0 (39.2)	6.7 (44.1)	3.9 (39.0)	1.1 (34.0)	−2.1 (28.2)	−3.9 (25.0)	−3.2 (26.2)	−2.8 (27.0)	−0.9 (30.4)	−1.7 (28.9)	1.9 (35.4)	3.9 (39.0)	−3.9 (25.0)
Average rainfall mm (inches)	22.5 (0.89)	24.5 (0.96)	21.2 (0.83)	25.0 (0.98)	38.1 (1.50)	37.5 (1.48)	36.0 (1.42)	39.0 (1.54)	37.6 (1.48)	35.4 (1.39)	28.9 (1.14)	25.7 (1.01)	371.2 (14.61)
Average rainy days (≥ 1.0 mm)	2.4	2.3	2.7	3.9	5.8	6.6	7.6	7.7	6.7	5.6	4.1	3.3	58.7
Source: Australian Bureau of Meteorology
