= Watchem West =

Watchem West Victoria
- Coordinates: 36°11′58″S 142°41′22″E
- Population: 29 (2021 census)
- Postcode(s): 3482
- LGA(s): Shire of Yarriambiack; Shire of Buloke
- State electorate(s): Lowan
- Federal division(s): Mallee

Watchem West is a locality in the Shire of Yarriambiack and the Shire of Buloke, Victoria, Australia. At the 2021 census, Watchem West had a population of 29.
