= Turriff, Victoria =

Turriff
- Town
- Coordinates: 35°28′S 142°27′E
- Country: Australia
- State: Victoria
- LGA: Shire of Yarriambiack
- Location: 425 km (264 mi) from Melbourne; 144 km (89 mi) from Mildura

Government
  - State electorate: Mildura
  - Federal division: Mallee

Population
  - Total: 30 (SAL 2021)
- Postcode: 3488

Turriff is a locality in Victoria, Australia, 144 kilometres (89 mi) south of the urban centre of Mildura in Yarriambiack Shire. Turriff borders the Wathe Flora and Fauna Reserve, a breeding ground for Mallee fowl.

Turriff was settled in 1902. The locality itself includes a small colonial history museum. In 2006 the population of Turriff was 140.

Turriff State School (No. 3537) opened in 1908, and was initially taught in alternating weeks with the Turriff East school. It was replaced with a new building about 1918. The school has since closed, and the building has since been moved to a different site within Turriff as part of the history museum.

Turriff West State School (No. 3946) opened in 1923, but later closed with the school building being relocated to the town of Ouyen in 1976. Turriff East State School (No. 3695) opened on 1 June 1911 and closed around 1932.

In 1994 a meteorite with a mass of 0.28 kilograms (0.62 lb) was found in a field near Turriff. The meteorite, comprising ordinary chondrite with traces of pyroxene, feldspar and kamacite, was subsequently gifted to Museum Victoria.

The former station at Turriff was closed to passenger and parcels traffic on 11 November 1975.

== See also ==
- Turriff East, Victoria
