= Lubeck, Victoria =

Lubeck
- Town
- Coordinates: 36°44′51″S 142°33′02″E
- Country: Australia
- State: Victoria
- LGAs: Shire of Yarriambiack; Shire of Northern Grampians

Government
  - State electorate: Lowan
  - Federal division: Mallee

Population
  - Total: 40 (2021 census)
- Postcode: 3385

Lubeck is a town in the Shire of Northern Grampians and the Shire of Yarriambiack, Victoria, Australia. At the 2021 census, Lubeck had a population of 40.

== History ==
Lubeck is named after the city of Lübeck in Schleswig-Holstein, Germany by early German Lutheran settlers. Lubeck developed as a key stop along the 1850s gold escort routes and the Stawell-Horsham road. The Halfway House hotel opened in 1869, with closer farming settlements beginning in 1871. The arrival of the railway from Stawell to Murtoa in 1878 spurred further growth, leading to the opening of the Railway Hotel and later the Commercial Hotel, which operated until 1960. Several stores served the community, the last closing in 1975, and a school was established in 1883.

In 1887, Lubeck became the starting point of a railway branch to Rupanyup, establishing it as a freight and passenger hub. A flour mill operated briefly in the 1880s-90s, and the station managed grain, wool, livestock, and creamery produce. The mechanics' institute, built in 1890 to replace an earlier structure, was later succeeded by a memorial hall. Despite its German roots, Lubeck's first church was shared by Methodists and Presbyterians, which may have helped the town retain its name during the anti-German sentiment of World War I. An Anglican church was also later established.

A concrete grain silo was built at the railway station in 1939, later joined by steel bins. Local trade declined after World War II, with the last store closing in 1975. The school shut down in 1990, and railway activity diminished after the closure of the Rupanyup branch line in 1983.
