= Bangarang (Doomtree song) =

Single by Doomtree

from the album No Kings
- A-side: "Bangarang"
- B-side: "Fresh New Trash"
- Released: May 28, 2012
- Recorded: 2011
- Genre: Alternative hip hop
- Length: 4:02
- Label: Doomtree Records
- Songwriters: P.O.S; Cecil Otter; Sims; Mike Mictlan
- Producers: Cecil Otter; Lazerbeak

"Bangarang" is a song by Minneapolis indie hip hop collective Doomtree. It was released as a single from their 2011 second album No Kings on May 28, 2012.

The song was written by Cecil Otter, Sims and Mike Mictlan. The recording for the album was produced by Cecil Otter and Lazerbeak. The song is frequently featured in the band's live shows.

== Music video ==
The music video for "Bangarang" was premiered by Vice on January 18, 2012. It features a cameo appearance by Har Mar Superstar.

== Reception ==
"Bangarang" was listed by KEXP-FM as the Song of the Day on January 23, 2012. The song received positive reviews by Vulture Hound, The Owl Mag , Obscure Sound, and Prefix. The song has also received positive reviews at live shows.
