= Bangerang, Victoria =

Bangerang
- Town
- Coordinates: 36.1986078°S 142.5667543°E
- Country: Australia
- State: Victoria
- LGA: Shire of Yarriambiack
- Location: 331 km (206 mi) NW of Melbourne; 77 km (48 mi) NE of Horsham; 21 km (13 mi) NE of Warracknabeal

Government
  - State electorate: Lowan
  - Federal division: Mallee
- Elevation: 103 m (338 ft)

Population
  - Total: 62 (SAL 2021)
- Postcode: 3393

Bangerang (/ˈbændʒəræŋ/ BAN-jə-rang) is a locality near Warracknabeal in Victoria, Australia. The population at the 2021 census was 62.

The township had a Mutual Improvement Association, Red Cross Society branch and a primary school. Local residents could join the Rifle Club, Cricket Club or go to the public library.
