= Shire of Yarriambiack =

Coordinates: 36°15′00″S 142°25′00″E

- Local government area
- Location in Victoria

- Interactive map of Shire of Yarriambiack
- Country: Australia
- State: Victoria
- Region: Grampians
- Established: 1995
- Council seat: Warracknabeal

Government
  - Mayor: Kylie Zanker
  - State electorates: Lowan; Mildura
  - Federal division: Mallee

Area
  - Total: 7,326 km^{2} (2,829 sq mi)

Population
  - Total: 6,556 (2021 census)
  - Density: 0.89489/km^{2} (2.3178/sq mi)
- Gazetted: 20 January 1995
- Website: Shire of Yarriambiack
LGAs around Shire of Yarriambiack
Mildura	Mildura	Mildura
Hindmarsh	Shire of Yarriambiack	Buloke
Horsham	Northern Grampians	Northern Grampians

The Shire of Yarriambiack is a local government area of Victoria, Australia, located in the north-western part of the state. It covers an area of 7,326 square kilometres (2,829 mi^{2}) and at the 2021 census, had a population of 6,556. It includes the towns of Hopetoun, Murtoa, Rupanyup and Warracknabeal.

The Shire is governed and administered by the Yarriambiack Shire Council; its seat of local government and administrative centre is located at the council headquarters in Warracknabeal, it also has service centres located in Hopetoun and Rupanyup. The Shire is named after Yarriambiack Creek, a geographical feature that meanders through the LGA from the Wimmera River, through Warracknabeal, to Lake Coorong at Hopetoun.

== History ==
The Shire of Yarriambiack was formed in 1995 from the amalgamation of the Shire of Warracknabeal, Shire of Karkarooc, most of the Shire of Dunmunkle, and part of the Shire of Wimmera.

In January 1996 part of the Richardson River catchment east and south of Rupanyup was transferred from the Northern Grampians Shire to Yarriambiack after a further Local Government Board review.

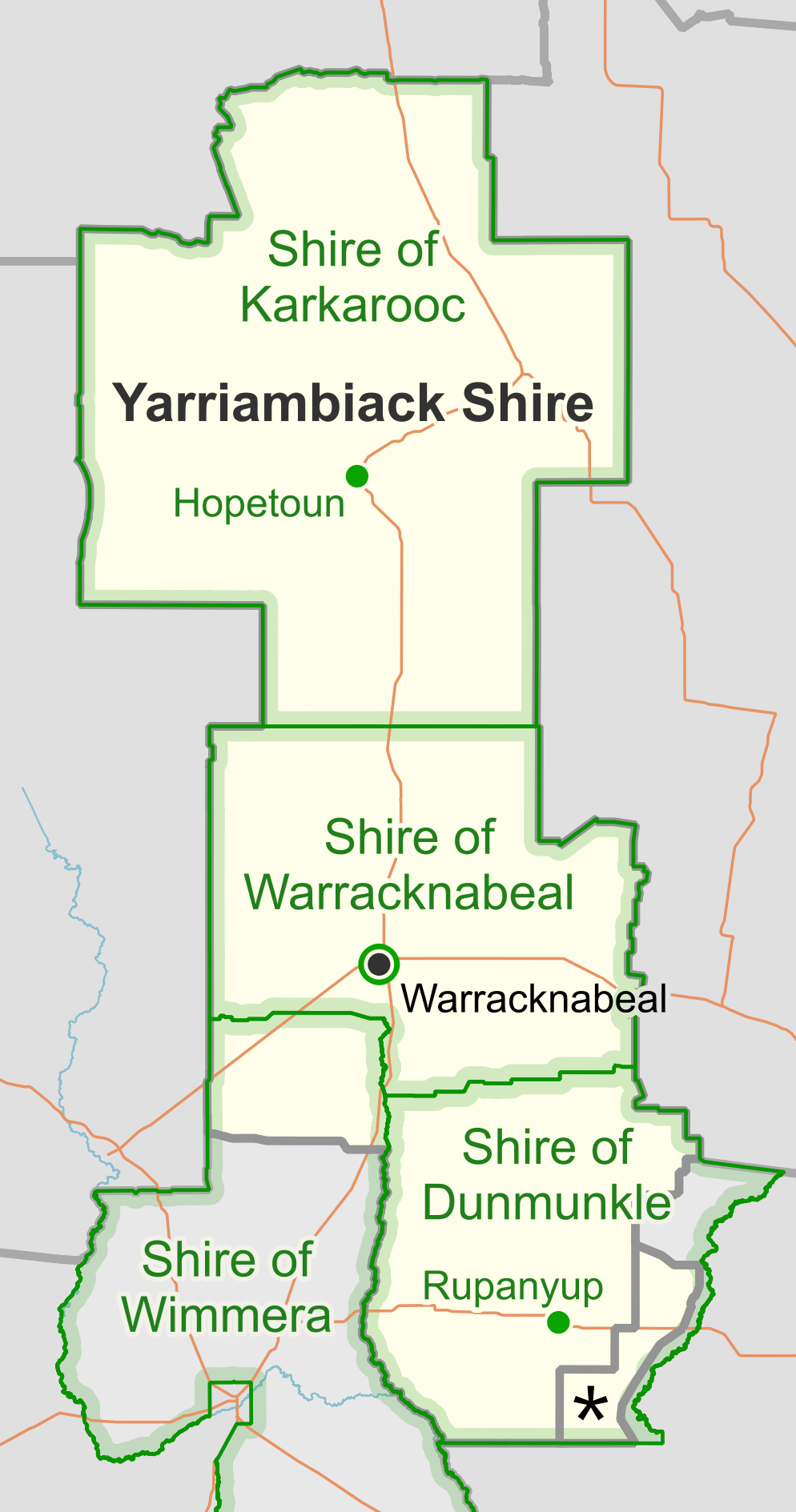
Yarriambiack Shire's predecessor LGAs (green) as they were in 1994. The administrative centres of the former LGAs are marked by green dots. 🞲 Area transferred from Northern Grampians Shire to Yarriambiack Shire in 1996

== Council ==
=== Current composition ===
The council is composed of three wards and six councillors. The current councillors, elected at the 2024 election, are:

Ward	Councillor	Notes
Dunmunkle	Corinne Heintze	
Dunmunkle	Melinda Keel	
Hopetoun	Andrew Mclean	Deputy Mayor
Hopetoun	Chris K. Lehmann	
Warracknabeal	Karly Kirk	
Warracknabeal	Kylie Zanker	Mayor

=== Administration and governance ===
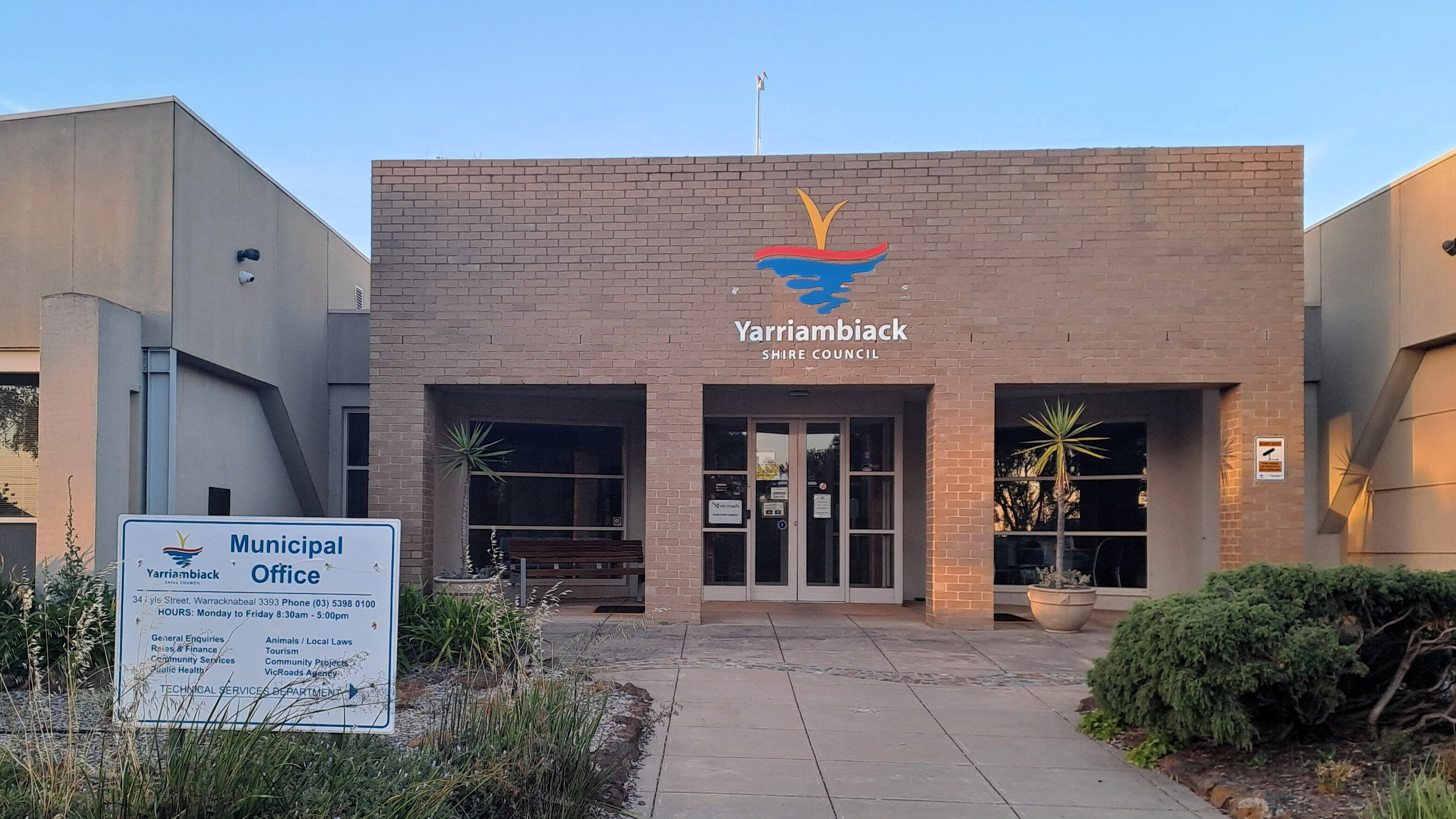
The municipal offices of the Yarriambiack Shire Council, 34 Lyle Street, Warracknabeal, Victoria

The council meets in the council chambers at the council headquarters in the Warracknabeal Municipal Offices, which is also the location of the council's administrative activities. It also provides customer services at both its administrative centre in Warracknabeal, and its service centres in Hopetoun and Rupanyup.

== Townships and localities ==
Population
Locality	2016	2021
Areegra	35	18
Aubrey	10	3
Bangerang	57	62
Beulah	329	312
Boolite	37	38
Brim	48	56
Cannum	48	45
Crymelon^	11	15
Dimboola^	1,730	1,635
Hopetoun	739	694
Jung^	241	#
Kellalac	17	13
Kewell^	48	57
Laen^	*	4
Lah	48	57
Lascelles	93	82
Lawler^	19	16
Longerenong^	*	237
Lubeck^	36	40
Minyip	524	525
Murra Warra^	72	63
Murtoa	865	897
Patchewollock^	133	149
Rainbow^	683	672
Rosebery	5	0
Rupanyup^	536	545
Sheep Hills	28	27
Speed	78	53
Tempy^	57	62
Turriff	29	30
Wallup	31	28
Warracknabeal	2,438	2,359
Watchem West^	18	29
Wilkur^	49	28
Willenabrina	9	17
Woomelang	201	191
Yaapeet	84	75

^ - Territory divided with another LGA
* - Not noted in 2016 Census
# - Not noted in 2021 Census

== See also ==
- List of places of worship in Yarriambiack Shire
- List of places on the Victorian Heritage Register in the Shire of Yarriambiack
