= Rupanyup =

- Town
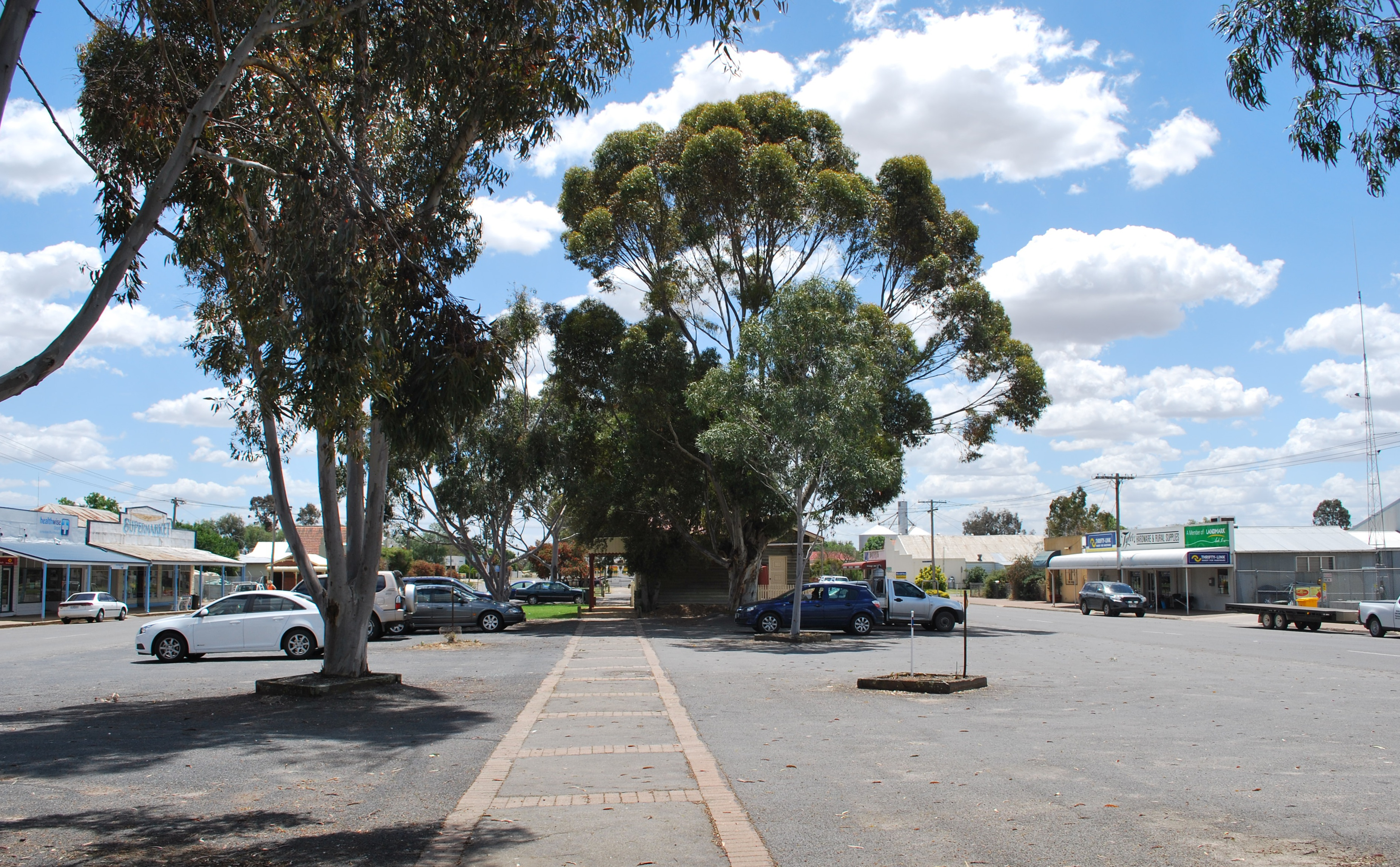
- Cromie St, the main street of Rupanyup

- Coordinates: 36°37′S 142°37′E
- Country: Australia
- State: Victoria
- LGA: Shire of Yarriambiack
- Location: 290 km (180 mi) NW of Melbourne; 49 km (30 mi) E of Horsham, Victoria; 18 km (11 mi) E of Murtoa
- Established: 1873

Government
  - State electorate: Lowan
  - Federal division: Mallee
- Elevation: 67 m (220 ft)

Population
  - Total: 536 (2016 census)
- Postcode: 3388
- Mean max temp: 21 °C (70 °F)
- Mean min temp: 3 °C (37 °F)
- Annual rainfall: 200 mm (7.9 in)

Rupanyup (/rəˈpænjəp/ rə-PAN-yəp) is a town in rural Victoria, Australia. As of the 2016 census, it had a population of 536. The name Rupanyup is an Aboriginal word meaning 'branch hanging over water'.

== History ==
The Post Office opened on 22 February 1875 as Karkarooc and was renamed Rupanyup in 1876.

The town used to be in the Shire of Dunmunkle but was allocated to the Shire of Yarriambiack when Victoria's municipalities were re-organized in the 1990s. The Bolangum railway line included a station at Rupanyup from 1887 in Gibson Street, until the line closed in 1983.

The town has art in the Silo Art Trail which also includes Sheep Hills, Brim, Rosebury, Lascelles and Patchewollock.

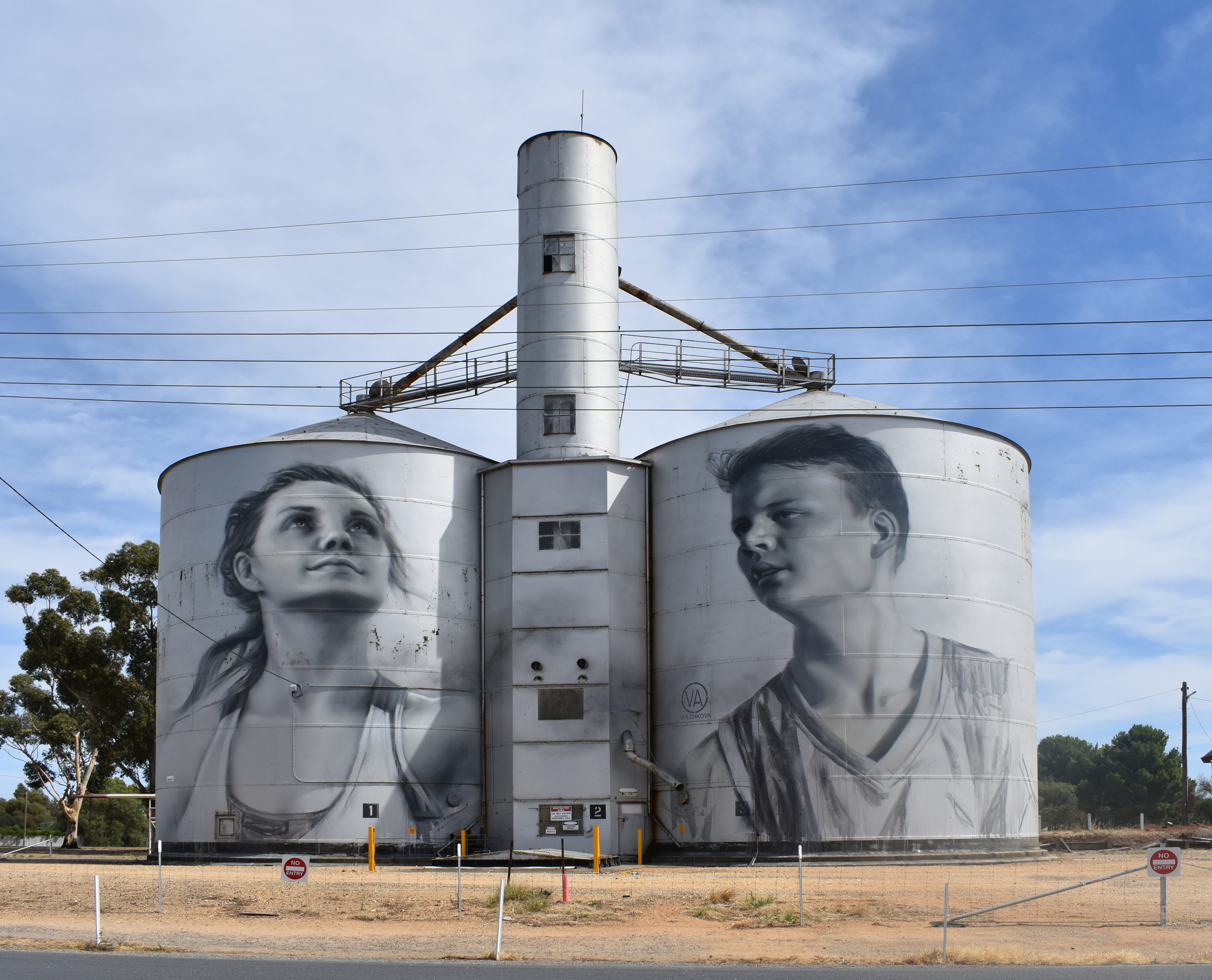
Rupanyup Silo Art

== Sport ==
Rupanyup FC Colours

The town has had Australian rules football since the 1870's and has multiple football and netball teams that have competed in the Horsham & District Football League since 1981.

Rupanyup FNC previously competed in the Wimmera Football League from 1946 to 1980, winning senior football premierships in 1961, 1963 and 1973.

Golfers play at the course of the Rupanyup Golf Club on Frayne Avenue.
