= Minyip =

- Town
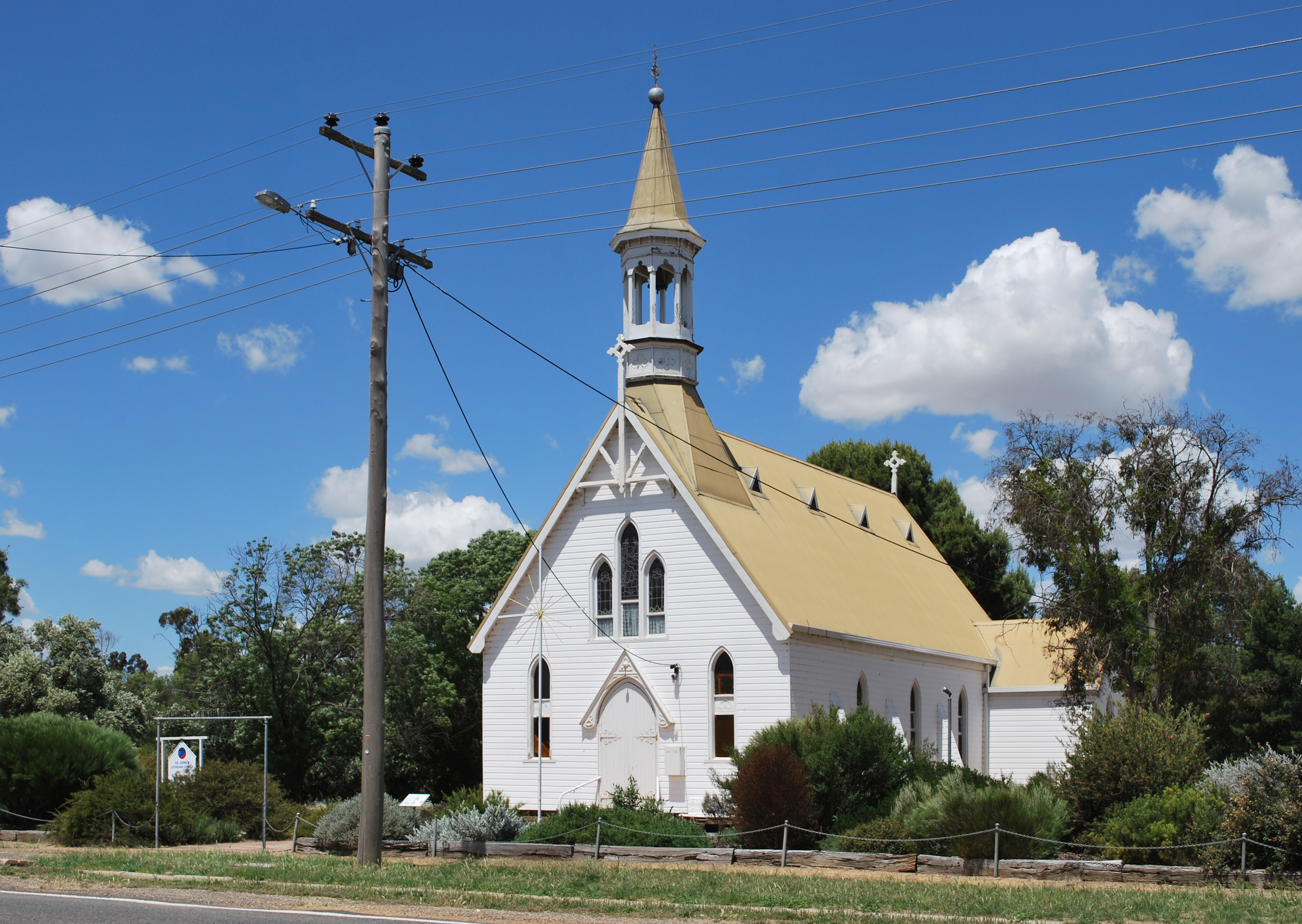
- St John's Lutheran church, Minyip

- Coordinates: 36°27′S 142°35′E
- Country: Australia
- State: Victoria
- LGA: Shire of Yarriambiack
- Location: 320 km (200 mi) NW of Melbourne; 197 km (122 mi) NW of Ballarat; 50 km (31 mi) N of Horsham
- Established: 1870s

Government
  - State electorate: Lowan
  - Federal division: Mallee

Population
  - Total: 524 (2016 census)
- Postcode: 3392

Minyip is a town in the Wimmera region of Victoria, Australia, 320 kilometres (199 mi) north west of Melbourne. It is in the Shire of Yarriambiack local government area. At the 2016 census, Minyip had a population of 524.

The name "Minyip" is derived from an Aboriginal word for "ashes" or "camping place".

The town is known as the "Heart of the Wheat Belt". Dryland agriculture especially grain production and handling is one of the region's major industries.

== History ==
The area was first settled by European selectors in about 1872. The town became a rail-head when the railway arrived from Murtoa in 1886. A grain shed was used to store local wheat until silos were built in 1939–40.

The town's courthouse dates from 1886 and the old office of the local newspaper The Guardian (1885) has been converted into an historical research centre by the local historical society. The Club Hotel (1907) and the Commercial Hotel (1908) are Edwardian buildings with wrought-iron lacework and leadlight windows. Violet's General Store dates from 1897.

Minyip Post Office opened on 1 May 1875.

There was a branch of the Commercial Bank of Australia in Minyip by 1891. The Colonial Bank of Australasia had a branch in the town by 1902.

Scots-born Aboriginal rights activist and medical doctor Charles Duguid and his first wife, Irene, lived in Minyip for about two years after their marriage in 1912. He practised as a general practitioner during this time.

The Minyip Magistrates' Court closed on 1 January 1983.

An agricultural show was held in Minyip between 1887 and 2018, but was ceased due to an inability to gather a committee to run it.

=== St John's Lutheran Church ===
The German Lutherans, fleeing religious persecution, came to the area around Minyip in the mid-to-late nineteenth century. One group formed at the tiny village of Kirchheim, 6 kilometres (3.7 mi) south-west of Minyip. They built a weatherboard church there in 1875 but it was destroyed by a violent storm in 1889. This led to the construction, in that same year, of the present timber building. In 1935 this building, which had an estimated weight of 50 tons, was moved by steam traction engine to its present site on the corner of Church and Carrol Streets. It took three days to move the structure the 6 kilometres (3.7 mi) from its original foundations. On the way it very nearly toppled over when it reached a rabbit warren and the weight caused the warren to collapse.

St John's is a Gothic design which retains its fine octagonal steeple with belfry, 19th-century pipe organ, stained-glass lancet windows and pews, although the men no longer sit on the opposite side of the aisle to the women.

== Today ==
Minyip was the filming location for exterior scenes in the 2020 film The Dry, representing the fictional town of Kiewarra, Victoria, as well as the television series The Flying Doctors, representing the fictional outback town of Coopers Crossing. The Flying Doctors' headquarters, Cooper's Crossing Garage, and Majestic Hotel are all located on the main street of the town and still visit-able. However, they now have alternative uses as the Minyip Senior Citizen's Centre and Guy's Coffee & Cafe respectively and a Men's Shed. As of 2021, the Club Hotel no longer operates as a hotel. In the Club Hotel, there is a room filled with Flying Doctors' memorabilia including signed scripts and props from the shows.

Main Street currently boasts an IGA supermarket, post office/pharmacy, cafe & takeaway, butcher, a second hand/op shop, a caravan park, art and craft groups. The Commercial Hotel and the Club Hotel are currently closed.

The children of Minyip attend a local kindergarten and primary school. There is a branch of WWHS on Church Street with a nurse on full-time. Minyip is also the home of the Dunmunkle Lodge Retirement Village.

The Minyip Lions Club is very active, as is the Historical Society. There are numerous plaques displaying the history of the town, with the biggest concentration being in the town square and outside the Senior Citizen's Centre.

Minyip hosts an annual car and motorcycle show, the Minyip Show and Shine, which has been held in the town since 2018.

== Sport and Recreation ==
Golfers play at the course of the Minyip Golf Club on Ubergangs Road each Sunday & Wednesday. There is also a bowling green, and an outdoor swimming pool.

=== Minyip Football Club ===

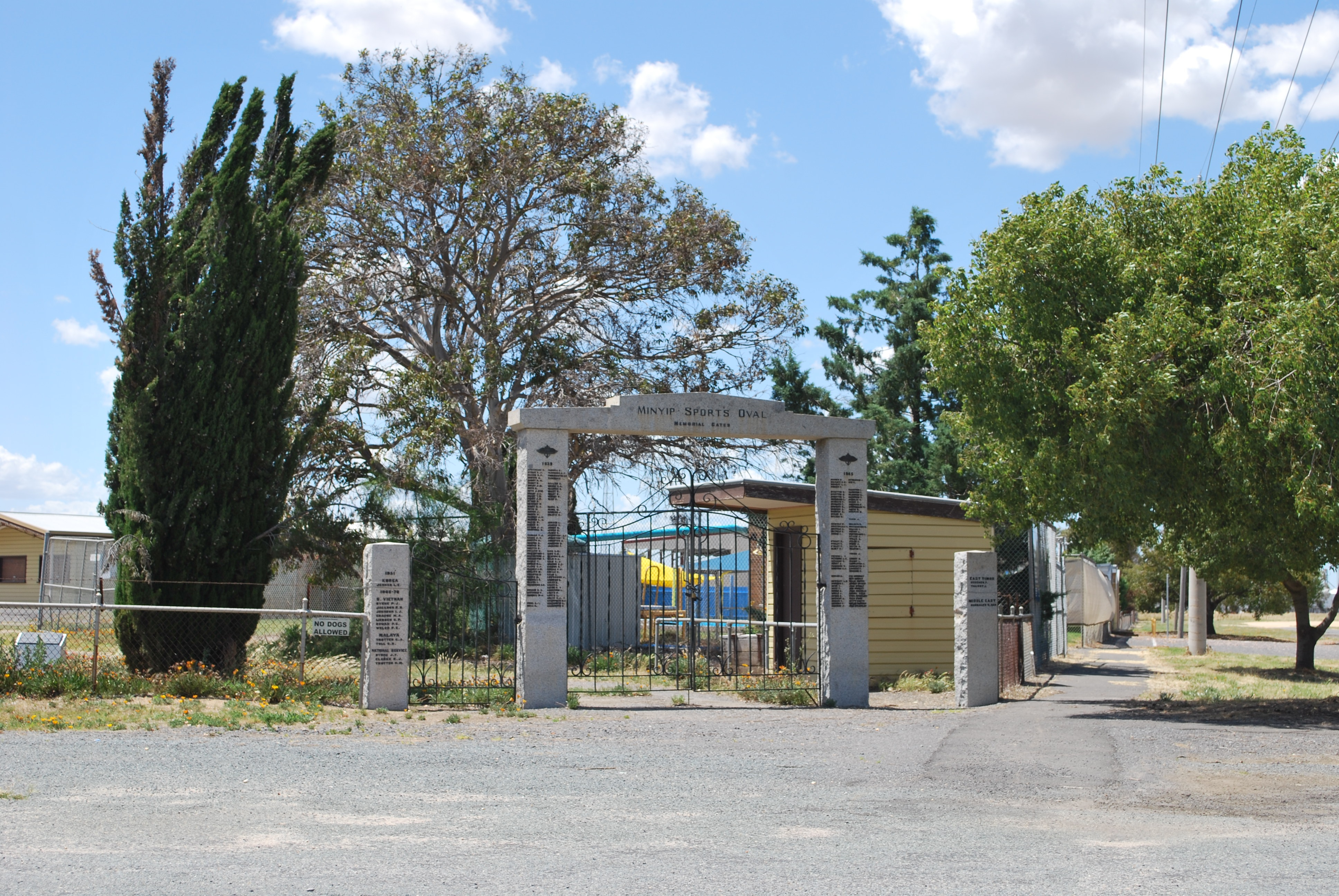
Minyip Sports Oval: Memorial Gates

The Minyip Football Club appears to have been established in 1875 when a match was played against Horsham, with the club initially playing friendly matches against local teams during its first 15 years of operations. Minyip first played competition football in the Sprague Cup in 1889.

Senior Football Premierships

- Franklin - Stevens Trophy
  - 1906 - Minyip: 7.8 - 50 d Murtoa: 6.9 - 45
- Wimmera District Football League
  - 1922 - Minyip: 8.6 - 54 d Warracknabeal: 7.11 - 53
- Mid - Wimmera Football League
  - 1934 - Minyip: 13.17 - 95 d Dimboola: 9.23 - 77
- Wimmera Football League
  - 1952 - Minyip: 11.12 - 78 d Warracknabeal: 9.14 - 68
  - 1954 - Minyip: ?.? - 72 d Jeparit: 7.12 - 54
  - 1984 - Minyip: 15.10 - 100 d Horsham: 6.16 - 52
  - 1991 - Minyip: 10.14 - 74 d Stawell: 2.8 - 20
  - 1992 - Minyip: 20.14 - 134 d Warracknabeal: 8.5 - 53
  - 1993 - Minyip: 20.15 - 135 d Ararat: 11.18 - 84

The Minyip FNC and Murtoa FNC merged in 1995 and now compete in the Wimmera Football Netball League as the Minyip / Murtoa Kookaburras FNC.

The town has an Australian rules football and netball club consisting of four football teams (Seniors, Reserves, Under 17's and Under 14's) and seven netball teams (A, B, C, C Reserve Grades, Under 17's, Under 15's and Under 13's).

== Gallery ==
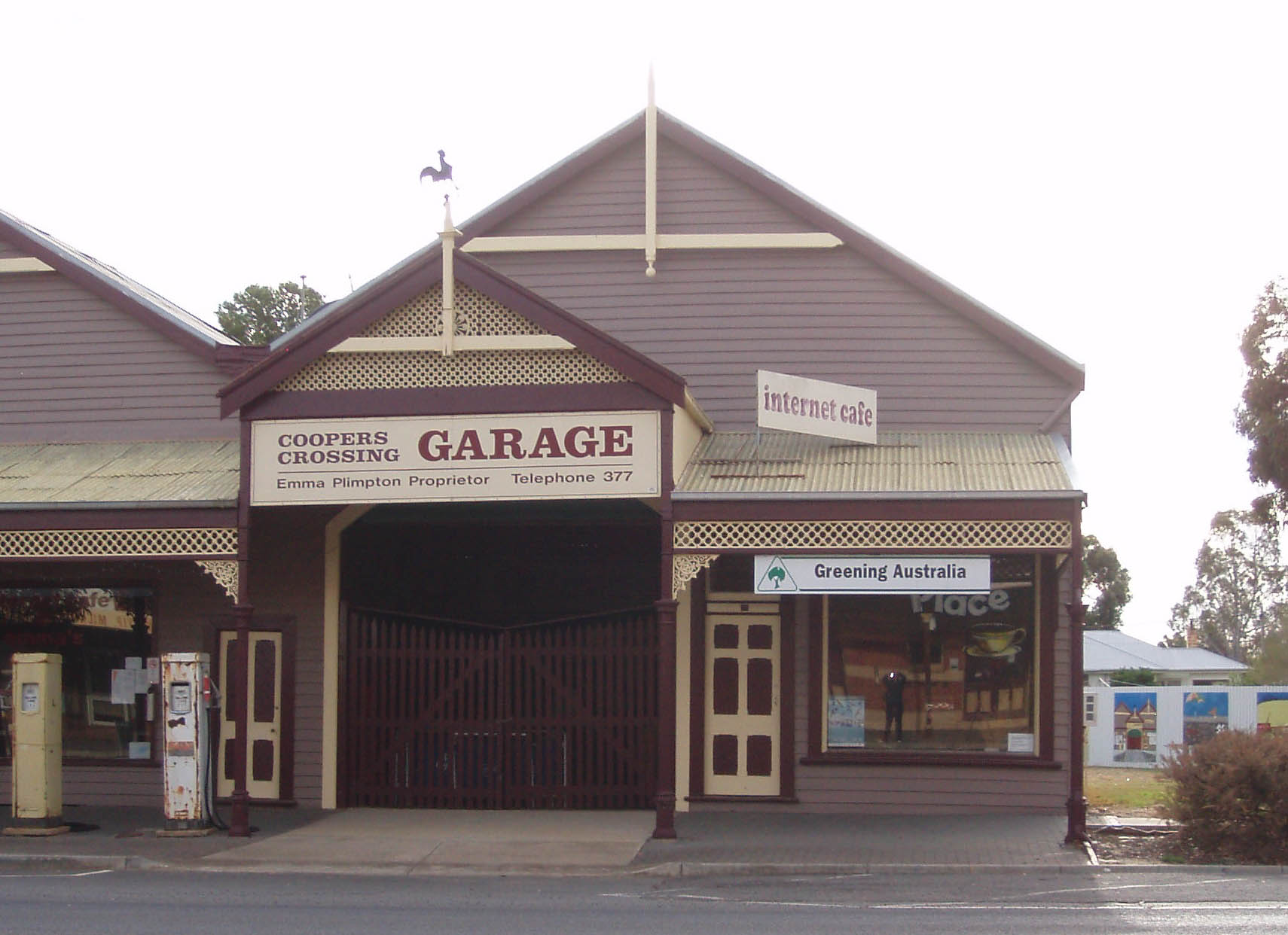
The Cooper's Crossing Garage

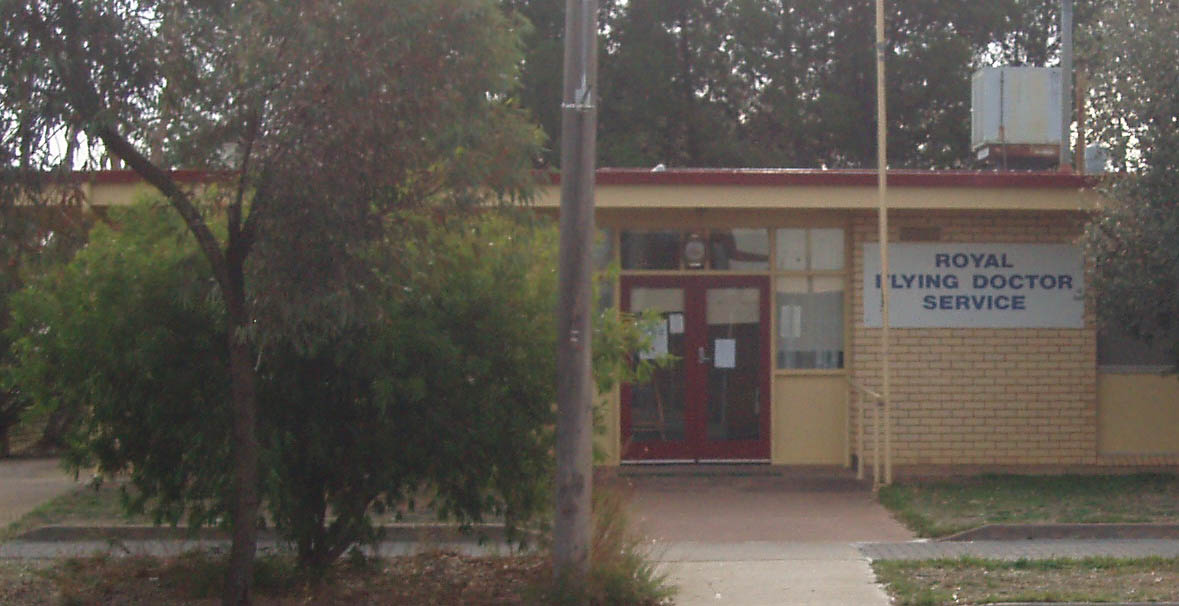
Headquarters of the Flying Doctors

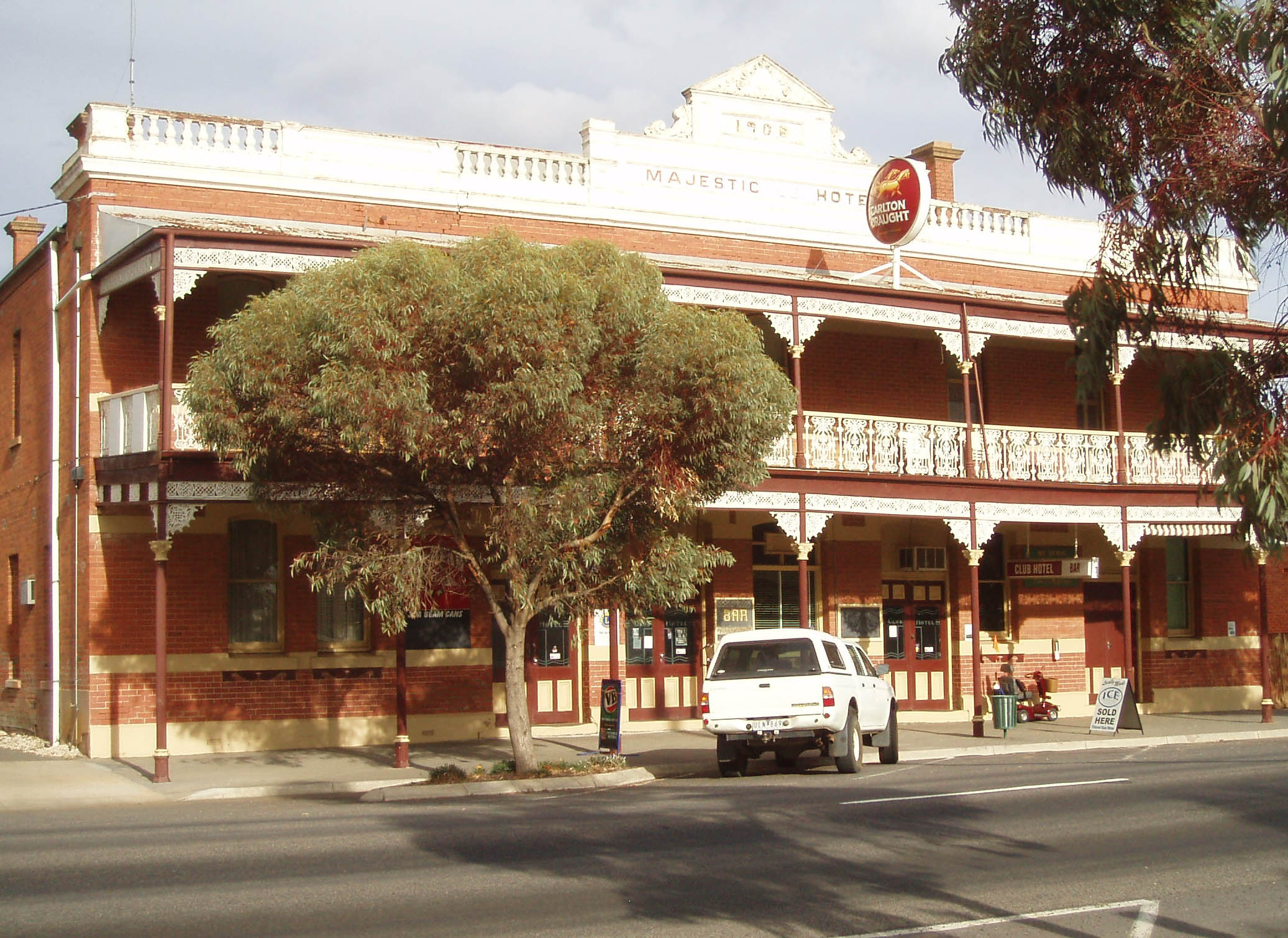
The Majestic Hotel
