= Hopetoun, Victoria =

Hopetoun
- Town
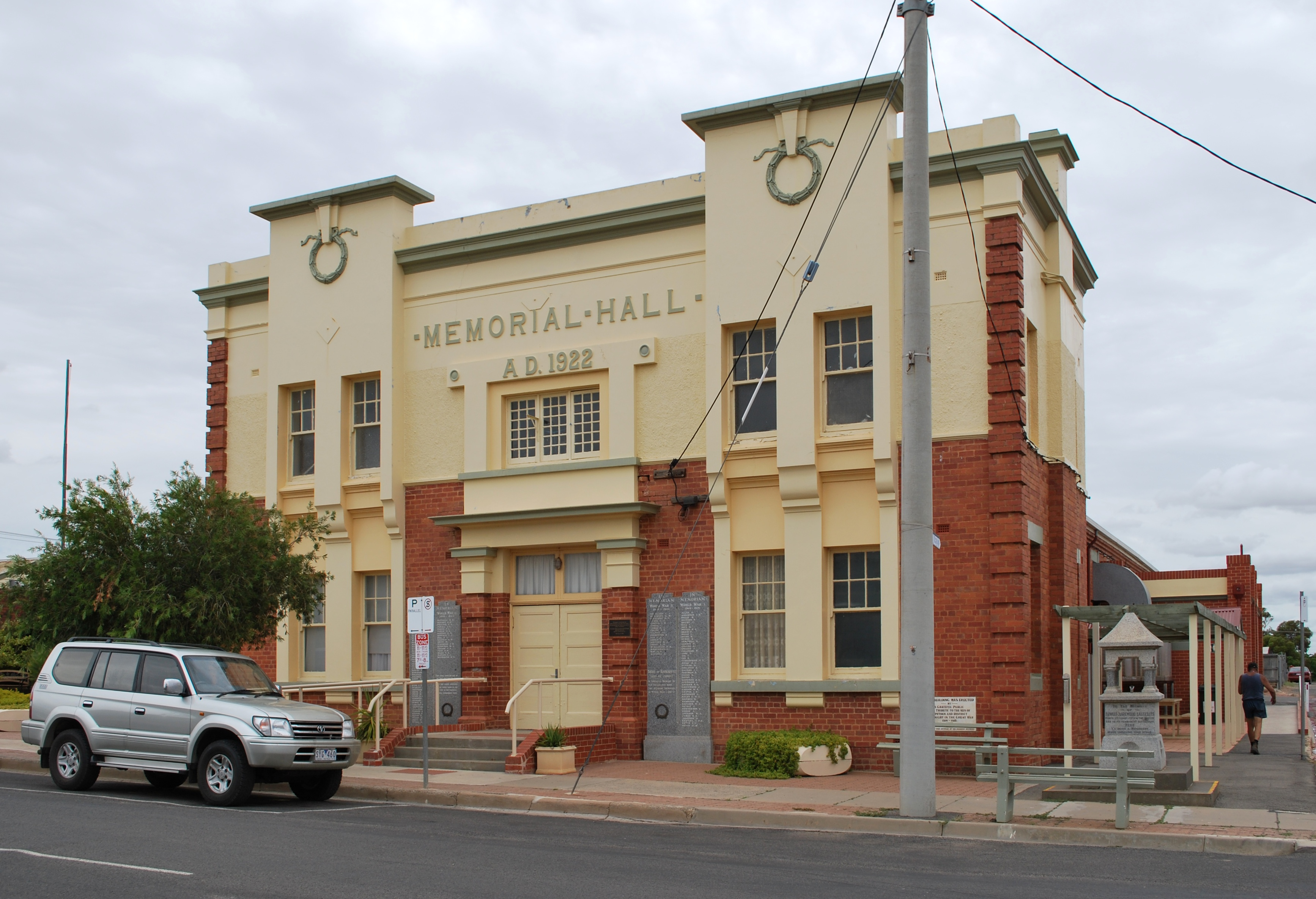
- Memorial Hall in Hopetoun, built in 1922

- Coordinates: 35°43′S 142°21′E
- Country: Australia
- State: Victoria
- LGA: Shire of Yarriambiack
- Location: 395 km (245 mi) NW of Melbourne; 195 km (121 mi) south of Mildura; 62 km (39 mi) north of Warracknabeal; 118 km (73 mi) north of Horsham

Government
  - State electorate: Mildura
  - Federal division: Mallee
- Elevation: 77 m (253 ft)

Population
  - Total: 694 (2021 census)
- Postcode: 3396
- Mean max temp: 24.0 °C (75.2 °F)
- Mean min temp: 8.7 °C (47.7 °F)
- Annual rainfall: 296.6 mm (11.68 in)

Hopetoun is a town which serves as the major service centre for the Southern Mallee area of Victoria, Australia. Hopetoun is situated 400 km (249 mi) north-west of Melbourne on the Henty Highway in the Shire of Yarriambiack. In the 2021 census, Hopetoun had a population of 694.

== History ==
The town was named after the 7th Earl of Hopetoun, the Governor of Victoria from 1889 to 1895 and later the first Governor-General of Australia. The post office opened on 12 September 1891 when the township was established.

During the early 2009 Australian heatwave, the town experienced several days of intense heat, with a peak of 48.8 °C (119.8 °F). The reading was the highest temperature nationwide during the heatwave and also broke the record for the highest temperature in Victoria.

The previous Victorian maximum temperature record was surpassed on 27 January 2026, when temperatures of 48.9 °C (120.0 °F) were recorded at both Hopetoun and Walpeup during a severe heatwave.

== Present ==
The town has one hotel, a supermarket (IGA), a newsagent, post office, chemist/pharmacist, hairdressers, service station, one Catholic primary school and a combined primary and secondary school, Hopetoun P-12 College, which caters for surrounding townships. It also has a fast food cafe and an op shop. It has a hospital with urgent care, an acute ward and a residential aged care facility. Hopetoun Airport serves the town.

Local attractions include Wyperfeld National Park, Yarriambiack Creek and Lake Coorong.

With neighbouring townships Rainbow, Jeparit, and Beulah, Hopetoun has a football and netball club, the Southern Mallee Thunder, competing in the Wimmera Football Netball League. The town also has a golf course, lawn bowls, cricket and tennis competitions, basketball and many other sporting and recreational activities for all ages.

Golfers play at the Hopetoun Golf Club on Rainbow Road.

== Geography ==
=== Climate ===
Hopetoun Airport has a cold semi-arid climate (Köppen: BSk) with hot summers and cool winters. The wettest recorded day was 12 January 2011 with 75.0 mm (2.95 in) of rainfall. Extreme temperatures ranged from 48.9 °C (120.0 °F) on 27 January 2026 to −6.4 °C (20.5 °F) on 15 June 2006.

Climate data for Hopetoun Airport 35.72°S 142.36°E, 77 m (253 ft) AMSL (2004–2026)
Month	Jan	Feb	Mar	Apr	May	Jun	Jul	Aug	Sep	Oct	Nov	Dec	Year
Record high °C (°F)	48.9 (120.0)	48.8 (119.8)	42.1 (107.8)	39.3 (102.7)	29.4 (84.9)	25.7 (78.3)	25.5 (77.9)	26.0 (78.8)	34.6 (94.3)	39.9 (103.8)	45.0 (113.0)	47.9 (118.2)	48.9 (120.0)
Mean daily maximum °C (°F)	33.2 (91.8)	32.0 (89.6)	28.9 (84.0)	23.8 (74.8)	18.9 (66.0)	15.3 (59.5)	15.0 (59.0)	16.9 (62.4)	20.3 (68.5)	24.5 (76.1)	27.9 (82.2)	30.7 (87.3)	24.0 (75.1)
Mean daily minimum °C (°F)	15.5 (59.9)	14.6 (58.3)	12.7 (54.9)	9.0 (48.2)	5.9 (42.6)	4.1 (39.4)	3.2 (37.8)	3.6 (38.5)	4.9 (40.8)	7.6 (45.7)	10.8 (51.4)	13.0 (55.4)	8.7 (47.7)
Record low °C (°F)	5.6 (42.1)	5.6 (42.1)	1.0 (33.8)	−1.7 (28.9)	−3.2 (26.2)	−6.4 (20.5)	−5.0 (23.0)	−5.3 (22.5)	−3.6 (25.5)	−1.4 (29.5)	−0.1 (31.8)	3.6 (38.5)	−6.4 (20.5)
Average precipitation mm (inches)	27.9 (1.10)	15.6 (0.61)	15.3 (0.60)	23.3 (0.92)	23.8 (0.94)	25.5 (1.00)	26.5 (1.04)	26.4 (1.04)	26.7 (1.05)	25.8 (1.02)	32.6 (1.28)	26.2 (1.03)	296.6 (11.68)
Average precipitation days (≥ 0.2 mm)	5.1	3.6	4.6	5.5	9.1	13.0	15.7	13.4	9.7	7.4	7.9	5.7	100.7
Source 1: Bureau of Meteorology (2004–2025)
Source 2: Australian Broadcasting Corporation
