= Warracknabeal =

- Town
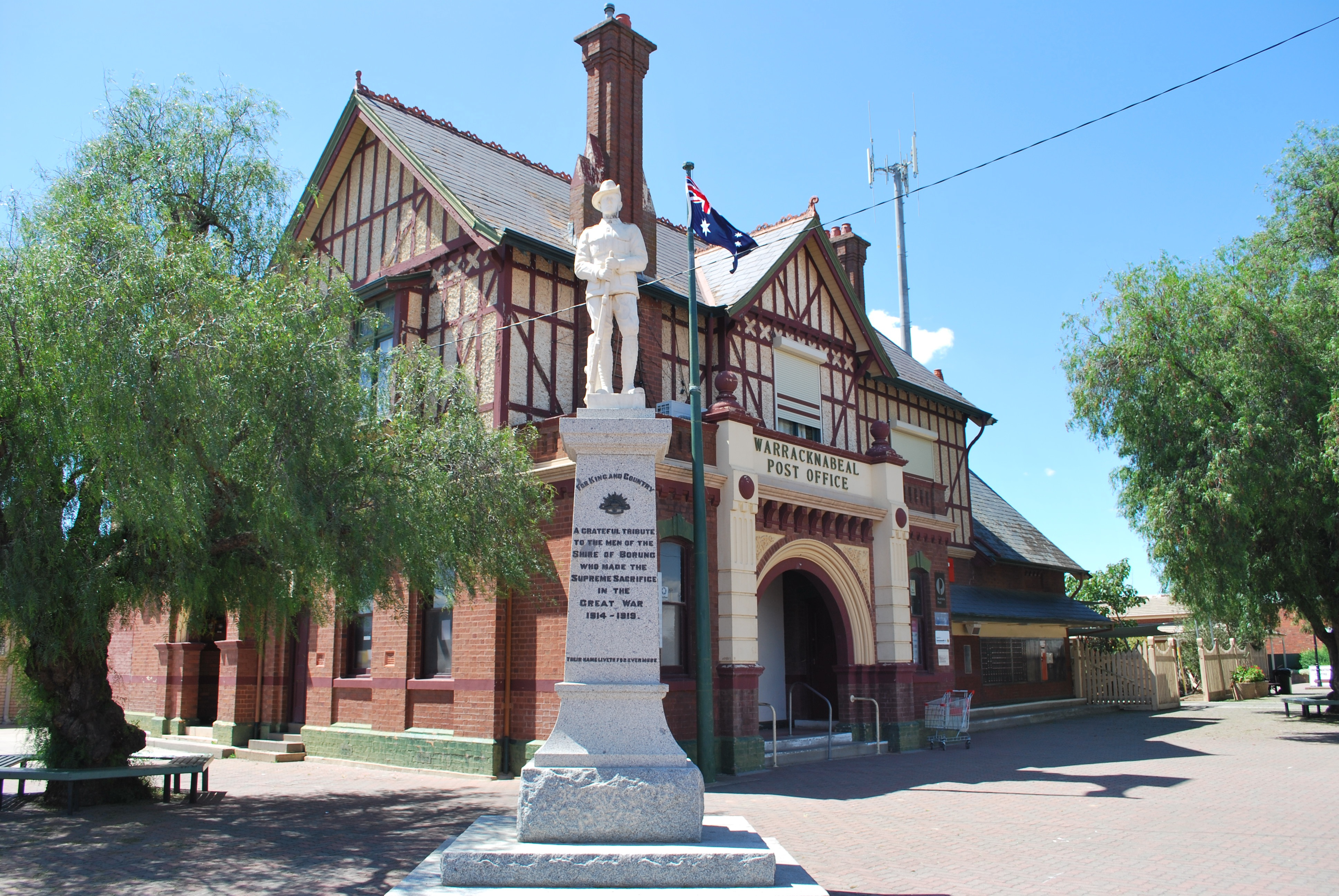
- Post office and war memorial, 2010

- Coordinates: 36°15′0″S 142°25′0″E
- Country: Australia
- State: Victoria
- LGA: Shire of Yarriambiack
- Location: 359 km (223 mi) NW of Melbourne; 58 km (36 mi) N of Horsham; 60 km (37 mi) W of Donald

Government
  - State electorate: Lowan
  - Federal division: Mallee
- Elevation: 113 m (371 ft)

Population
  - Total: 2,359 (2021 census)
- Postcode: 3393
- Mean max temp: 22.2 °C (72.0 °F)
- Mean min temp: 8.6 °C (47.5 °F)
- Annual rainfall: 397.4 mm (15.65 in)

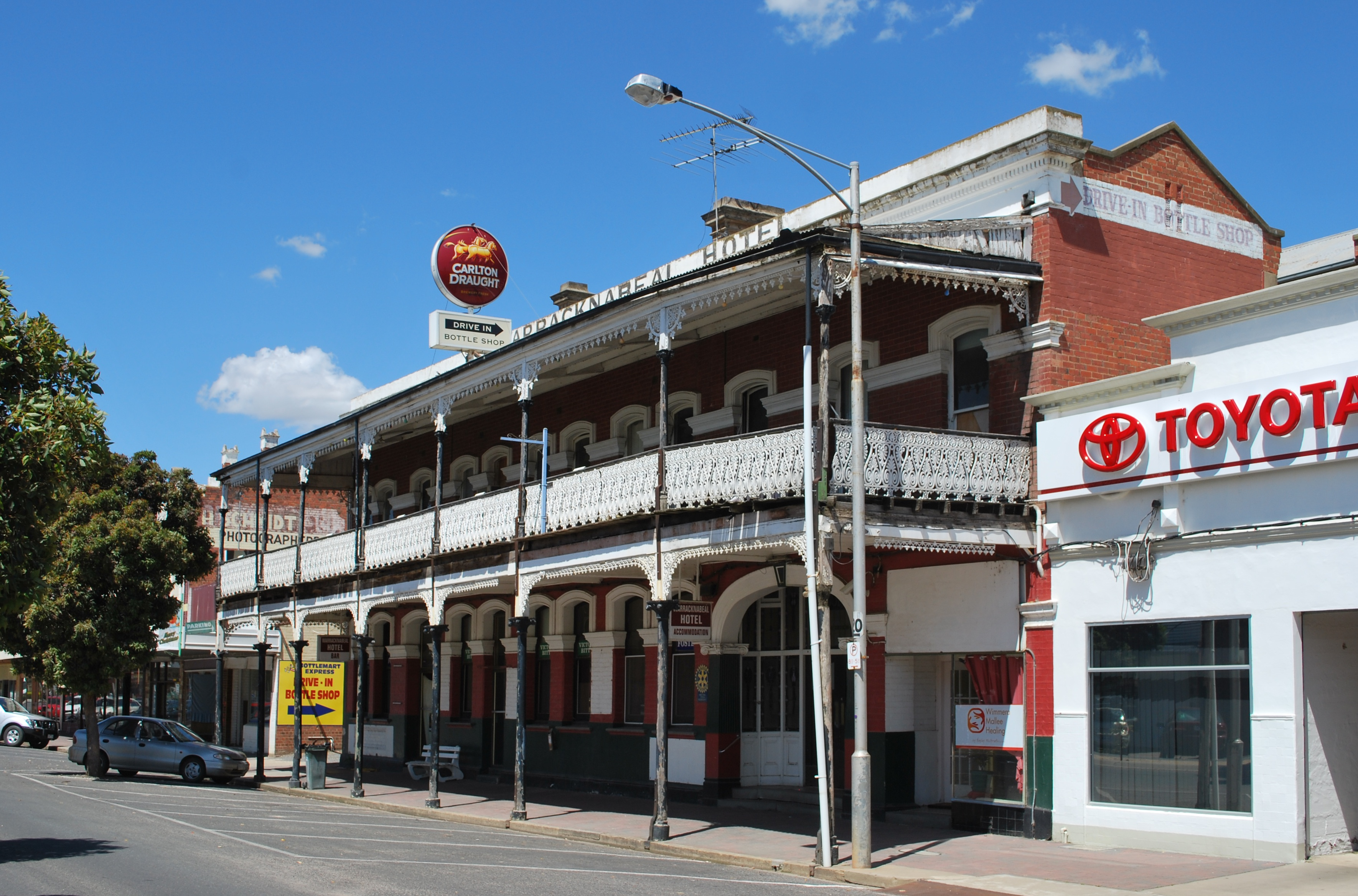
Warracknabeal Hotel, 2010

Warracknabeal (/ˈwɒrɪknəbiːl/ WORR-ik-nə-beel) is a town in the Australian state of Victoria, located in the Victorian wheatbelt. Situated on the banks of the Yarriambiack Creek, 330 km northwest of Melbourne, it is the business and services centre of the northern Wimmera and southern Mallee districts, and hosts local government offices of the Shire of Yarriambiack. At the 2021 census, the Warracknabeal township had a population of 2,359.

== History ==
The original inhabitants of the area around Warracknabeal were the Wotjobaluk tribe of Aboriginal people. The town's name is believed to derive from an Aboriginal expression meaning "place of big gums shading the water hole". The earliest European settlers in the area included Andrew and Robert Scott, who established the first run of the name.

The Post Office opened on 1 September 1861 and was known as Werracknebeal until 1885.

Among the historical buildings are a 1872 prison cell built from red and yellow gum, a Tudor-style post office, several 19th-century hotels and pubs, and a four-storey water tower from 1886. There is also an agricultural machinery museum housing pieces from the history of farming in the Mallee and Wimmera districts.

The Warracknabeal Magistrates' Court closed on 1 January 1990.

== Localities ==
Warracknabeal's bounded locality includes the rural neighbourhoods of Batchica 36°11′10″S 142°23′54″E, whose post office opened as Yellangip South in 1908, renamed Batchica in 1909, and closed in 1931; Challambra 36°14′46″S 142°31′53″E, whose post office opened as Challamba Dam (sic) around 1902, which was renamed Challamba in 1905 and closed in 1918; and Mellis 36°17′47″S 142°28′57″E, whose post office opened around 1907 and closed in 1954.

== Traditional ownership ==
The formally recognised traditional owners for the area in which Warracknabeal sits are the Wotjobaluk, Jaadwa, Jadawadjali, Wergaia and Jupagik nations. These nations are represented by the Barengi Gadjin Land Council Aboriginal Corporation.

== Demographics ==
As of the 2021 census, 2,359 people resided in Warracknabeal, a slight decline from 2,438 in the 2016 census, with several hundred more living in the surrounding district. Per the 2016 census, the median age of persons in Warracknabeal was 50 years. Children aged 0–14 years made up 16% of the population. People over the age of 65 years made up 27.8 percent of the population. There are slightly more females than males, with 50.2% of the population female and 49.8% male. The average household size is 2.1 persons per household. The average number of children per family for families with children is 1.9.

82.6% of people were born in Australia. Of persons living in Warracknabeal, 1.5% (36 persons) were Aboriginal and/or Torres Strait Islander people. This is higher than for the state of Victoria (0.8%) but lower than the national average (2.8%). The most common ancestries in Warracknabeal were Australian 33.0%, English 30.6%, Scottish 7.7%, Irish 7.2% and German 7.1%.

Of the people aged 15 and over, 10% reported having completed year 12 as their highest level of educational attainment. This is lower than the state average 15.9% and the national average of 15.7%.

In the 2016 census, just over half (54.0%) of the population of Warracknabeal reported being employed full time, 34.9% part-time, 6.1% were away from work and 5% were unemployed. Of those people over the age of 15 and employed, 40.4% work 40 hours or more per week. The hospital industry employs the largest number of people in Warracknabeal (15.0%). The median total family income was $1,194 per week, and median household income was $870. This is 39.5% less than the $1,438 median household income for Australia from the same 2016 census.

Almost a third (31.8%) of people in Warracknabeal reported doing voluntary work through an organisation or group in the 12 months before the election. This is more than 50% higher than both the state (19.2%) and national averages (19.0).

Median weekly rent was $150, and median monthly mortgage repayments were $758. Almost half (49.4%) own their home outright. Private dwellings in Warracknabeal tend to be separate houses (93.5%). Most of these have three bedrooms (57.2%). Just over two-thirds (67.5%) of household have at least one person access the internet from their dwelling. This is lower than the state (83.7%) and national (83.2%).

== Healthcare ==
The town is serviced by several doctors and one pharmacy. Hospital services are provided by Rural Northwest Health. The town is also home to Woodbine Inc., a disability service provider with a long and rich history.

== Schools ==
The town has four schools: St Mary's Catholic Primary School is private, but public schools Warracknabeal Secondary College, Warracknabeal Primary School and Warracknabeal Special Developmental School are a collective as of 2024, known as the Warracknabeal Education Precinct.

== Sport ==
The town has an Australian rules football team (Warrack Eagles) competing in the Wimmera Football League.

Warrack Eagles Netball Club competes in the Wimmera Netball Association.

The town has two teams that compete in the Dimboola Tennis Association competition as of 2015: Warracknabeal Gold and Warracknabeal Maroon.

The horse racing club—the Wimmera Racing Club—schedules around six race meetings a year at Warracknabeal, including the Warracknabeal Cup meeting every Easter Saturday. It also has the Sheep Hills Race Club, which schedules two race meetings a year, including the Sheep Hills Cup meeting in February.

Golfers play at the Warracknabeal Golf Club on the town's north-eastern outskirts.

Warracknabeal has a cricket club (St Mary's) in the Wimmera Mallee Cricket Association, with two senior teams. Notably, Bailey Watts had the dubious distinction of breaking the world record for most ducks in a row while playing for St Mary’s.

It has three hockey teams: a senior men's team (Hoops), a women's team, and a mixed junior team (Revengers).

Warracknabeal also has a roller derby team called the Wheat City Derby Angels. They participate in tournaments around Victoria.

== Governance ==
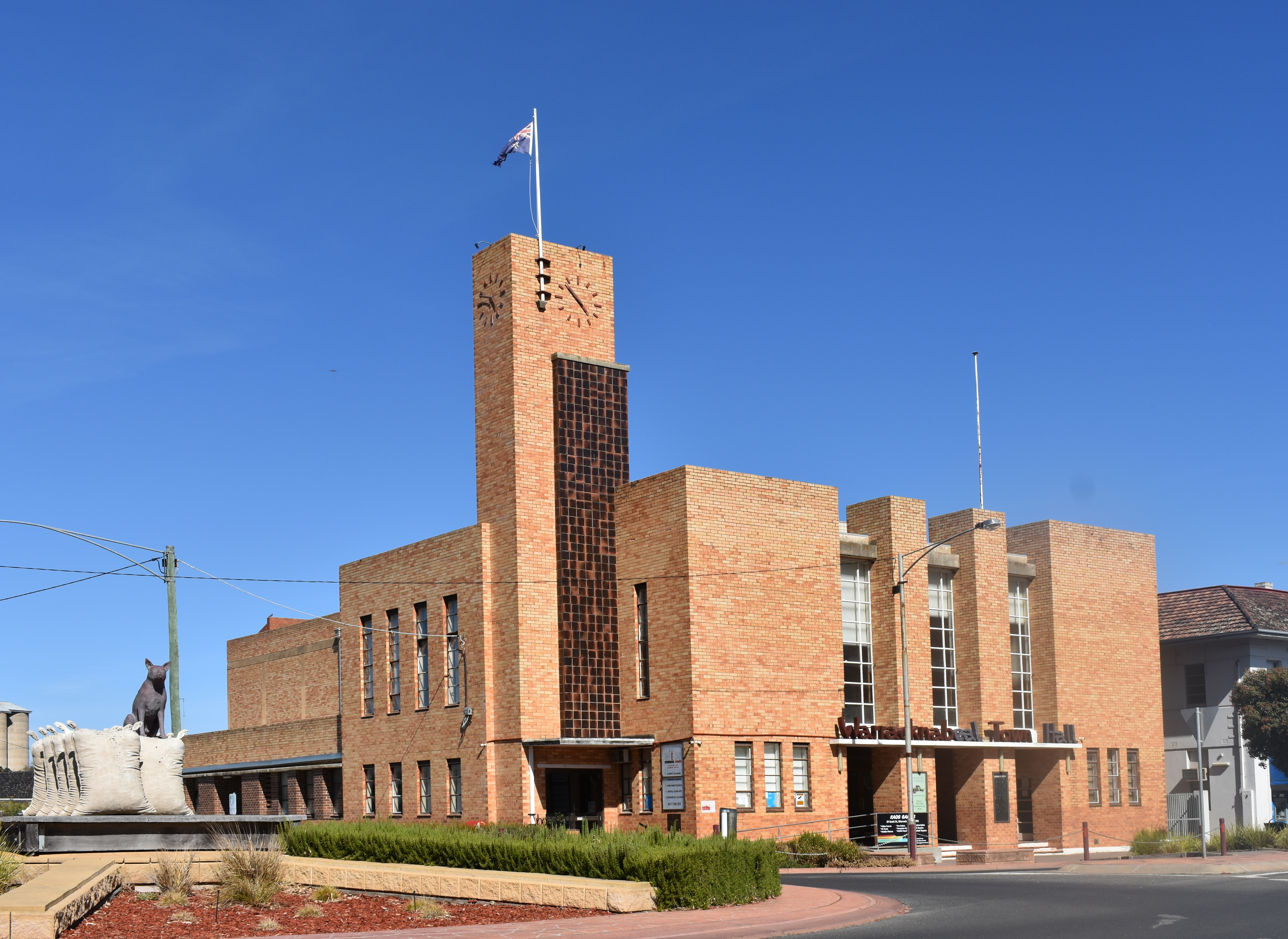
Former Town Hall, with sheep dog and wheatbag statue (left), 2018

Warracknabeal is the seat of government for the Shire of Yarriambiack, with a total shire population of 6,556 people as of 2022. It is also the administrative centre. The council offices are located in Lyle Street.

The former town hall and theatre complex (built 1939–40), added to the Victorian Heritage Register in 2009, is now used for civic purposes.

== Easter Y-Fest ==
Y-Fest incorporates an Easter Saturday Street Parade, a three-day Vintage machinery rally at Wheatlands Museum, a four-day golf tournament, a three-day art show, an Easter Saturday race meeting, and a water ski spectacular. The town of ~2,400 people swells with many visitors, friends and family, and it offers many family and community events every year.

The Easter Y-Fest will have its 37th year in 2025 and continues to grow stronger as the individual events that make up Y-Fest, benefit from the joint marketing efforts of the Y-Fest Promotions Committee Inc. This Committee, made up of representatives from each of the individual event committees and Council, was formed as a marketing group to promote the Y-Fest concept and has been successful in boosting attendances at all venues.

== Notable people ==
Arts and media

- Jack Hibberd (1940–2024), playwright
- Nick Cave (born 1957), musician

Military

- Linden Cameron MC (1918–1986), Australian army officer
- John (Jack) O'Dea (1920–1993), Lt Col, AFL ACT Hall of Fame

Politics

- Thomas d'Alton (1895–1968), politician
- Jack Ginifer (1927–1982), Labor politician
- Bernie Dunn (born 1944), National Party politician
- Rod Fyffe (1949–2014), politician

Sport

- Ken Smale (born 1933), Australian rules footballer
- John Hayes (1939), Australian rules footballer
- Graeme Clyne (born 1941), Australian rules footballer
- Russell Crow (born 1941), Australian rules footballer
- Andy Wilson (born 1951), Australian rules footballer
- Graeme Schultz (born 1953), Australian rules footballer
- Lauren Hewitt (born 1978), Olympic track and field medalist
- Jeremy Clayton (born 1981), Australian rules footballer
- Natalie Medhurst (born 1984), netballer
- Matt Rosa (born 1986), Australian rules footballer
- Kyle Cheney (born 1989), Australian rules footballer

== Climate ==
Climate data for Warracknabeal, elevation 113 m (371 ft), (1991–2019, extremes 1969–2019)
Month	Jan	Feb	Mar	Apr	May	Jun	Jul	Aug	Sep	Oct	Nov	Dec	Year
Record high °C (°F)	46.0 (114.8)	46.8 (116.2)	41.0 (105.8)	37.2 (99.0)	29.0 (84.2)	25.2 (77.4)	25.0 (77.0)	28.0 (82.4)	33.0 (91.4)	37.6 (99.7)	43.8 (110.8)	45.0 (113.0)	46.8 (116.2)
Mean daily maximum °C (°F)	31.4 (88.5)	30.8 (87.4)	27.3 (81.1)	22.8 (73.0)	18.0 (64.4)	14.8 (58.6)	14.1 (57.4)	15.6 (60.1)	18.5 (65.3)	22.6 (72.7)	26.2 (79.2)	29.0 (84.2)	22.6 (72.7)
Mean daily minimum °C (°F)	14.5 (58.1)	14.1 (57.4)	11.9 (53.4)	8.9 (48.0)	6.5 (43.7)	4.7 (40.5)	4.0 (39.2)	4.3 (39.7)	5.8 (42.4)	7.7 (45.9)	10.3 (50.5)	12.4 (54.3)	8.8 (47.8)
Record low °C (°F)	5.0 (41.0)	4.8 (40.6)	2.8 (37.0)	−0.7 (30.7)	−2.0 (28.4)	−4.5 (23.9)	−4.7 (23.5)	−3.0 (26.6)	−1.7 (28.9)	−1.5 (29.3)	0.5 (32.9)	4.0 (39.2)	−4.7 (23.5)
Average rainfall mm (inches)	24.1 (0.95)	21.8 (0.86)	15.5 (0.61)	20.4 (0.80)	36.7 (1.44)	41.8 (1.65)	38.6 (1.52)	39.9 (1.57)	41.5 (1.63)	28.7 (1.13)	31.7 (1.25)	32.3 (1.27)	372.8 (14.68)
Average rainy days (≥ 1.0 mm)	3.0	2.5	2.9	3.5	6.6	7.4	8.7	8.8	7.5	5.4	4.9	4.1	65.3
Source: Australian Bureau of Meteorology

== See also ==
- Warracknabeal Airport
- Warracknabeal Cemetery
