= Wimmera Highway =

Highway in Victoria and South Australia

Wimmera Highway Victoria–South Australia
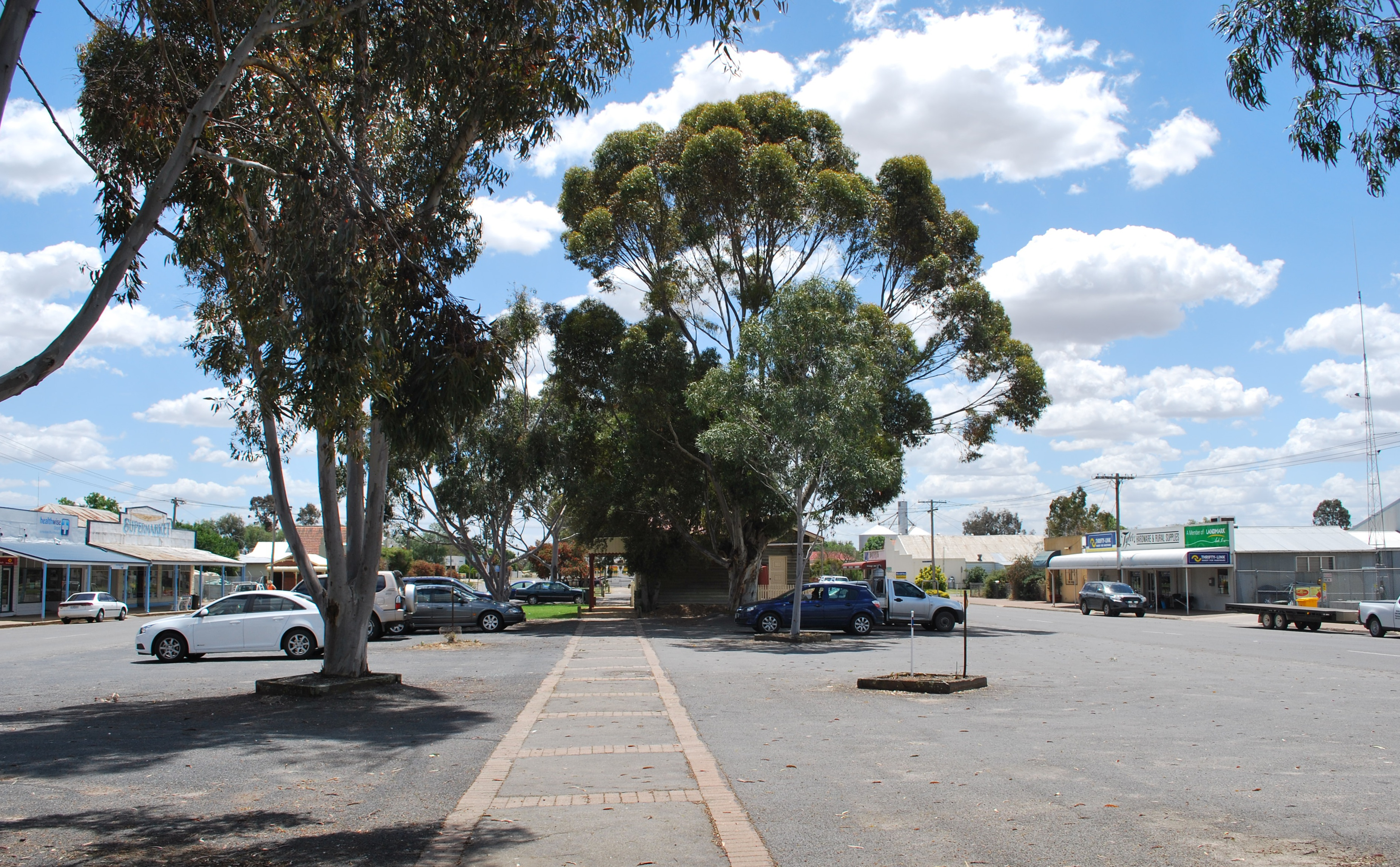
- Wimmera Highway passing through Rupanyup
- Coordinates: 36.742535°S 144.129863°E (East end); 36.958816°S 140.731210°E (West end)

General information
- Type: Highway
- Length: 346.1 km (215 mi)
- Gazetted: March 1915 (as Main Road); 1959/60 (as State Highway)
- Route number(s): B240 (2003–present) (Marong–VIC/SA border); C240 (1998–present) (VIC/SA border–Naracoorte)
- Former route number: C240 (1998–2003) (Marong–VIC/SA border); State Route 130 (1986–1998) (St Arnaud–Naracoorte)

Major junctions
- East end: Calder Alternative Highway; Marong, Victoria
- Sunraysia Highway; Henty Highway; Western Highway; Riddoch Highway
- West end: Lucindale Road; Naracoorte, South Australia

Location(s)
- Region: Limestone Coast, Grampians, Loddon Mallee
- Major settlements: Newbridge, St Arnaud, Rupanyup, Murtoa, Horsham, Natimuk, Edenhope, Apsley

Highway system
- Highways in Australia; National Highway • Freeways in Australia; Highways in Victoria; Highways in South Australia

Wimmera Highway is a 345-kilometre rural highway that runs predominantly through the Wimmera region of western Victoria, after which the highway is named. It links the towns of Marong, Victoria, just to the west of the major regional centre of Bendigo in Victoria, and Naracoorte, in the south-eastern corner of South Australia.

== Route ==
Wimmera Highway commences at the intersection with Calder Alternative Highway in Marong and heads in a westerly direction as a two-lane, single-carriageway rural highway to Newbridge, where it crosses the Loddon River, and continues westwards until it meets Sunraysia Highway in St Arnaud. It continues west through Rupanyup until it reaches Henty Highway in Dooen, where it forms a concurrency with it and heads southwest into the regional city of Horsham, where it meets Western Highway. It continues in a south-westerly direction on its own alignment through Edenhope, before it crosses the interstate border into South Australia and eventually terminates at the intersection with Riddoch Highway in Naracoorte.

== History ==
The passing of the Country Roads Act 1912 through the Parliament of Victoria provided for the establishment of the Country Roads Board (later VicRoads) and their ability to declare Main Roads, taking responsibility for the management, construction and care of the state's major roads from local municipalities. Horsham-Natimuk(-Edenhope) Road from Horsham to the southern end of Karnak, Edenhope-Goroke Road from the southern end of Karnak to Edenhope (and continuing north to Goroke), and Hamilton-Edenhope-Aspley Road from Edenhope through Aspley to the South Australian border (and continuing east to Harrow), were declared Main Roads on 17 March 1915; and Rupanyup–Murtoa Road between Rupanyup to Murtoa was declared a Main Road on 28 May 1915.

The passing of the Developmental Roads Act 1918 through the Parliament of Victoria allowed the Country Road Board to declare Developmental Roads, serving to develop any area of land by providing access to a railway station for primary producers. Marnoo–St Arnaud Road between Marnoo and St Arnaud was declared a Developmental Road on 3 March 1924.

The passing of the Highways and Vehicles Act 1924 provided for the declaration of State Highways, roads two-thirds financed by the State government through the Country Roads Board. Wimmera Highway was declared a State Highway in the 1959/60 financial year, from St Arnaud via Rupanyup, Horsham and Edenhope to the South Australian border (for a total of 146 miles), subsuming the original declarations of Rupanyup–Murtoa Road, Horsham-Natimuk-Edenhope Road, Edenhope-Goroke Road (between Karnak and Edenhope) and Hamilton-Edenhope-Aspley Road (between Edenhope and the SA border) as Main Roads, and Marnoo–St Arnaud Road as a Developmental Road; before this declaration, these roads were also referred to as Horsham–Murtoa Road and Navarre Road. The highway was extended a further 90 km east (along the former Bendigo–St Arnaud Road) to Marong, just outside Bendigo, in the late 1990s.

A new bridge over Loddon River in Newbridge (on the then-Bendigo-St Arnaud Road) was opened in 1996, replacing an older, flood-prone structure that could no longer be maintained in a cost-effective manner, at a cost of $1.4 million.

Wimmera Highway was signed as State Route 130 between Naracoorte and St Arnaud in 1986; with Victoria's conversion to the newer alphanumeric system in the late 1990s, this was replaced by route C240 between Naracoorte and Marong. Subsequent road upgrades allowed the Victorian section to be reallocated route B240 in 2003.

The passing of the Road Management Act 2004 granted the responsibility of overall management and development of Victoria's major arterial roads to VicRoads: in 2004, VicRoads re-declared the road as Wimmera Highway (Arterial #6110), beginning at the South Australian border and ending at Calder Alternative Highway in Marong.

== Major intersections ==
State	LGA	Location	km	mi	Destinations	Notes
Victoria	Greater Bendigo	Marong	0.0	0.0	Calder Alternative Highway (A790) – Bendigo, Ravenswood, Melbourne	Eastern terminus of highway and route B240
Victoria	Loddon	Newbridge	20.0	12.4	Bridgewater–Maldon Road (C282 north) – Bridgewater	Concurrency with route C282
Victoria	Loddon	Newbridge	21.0	13.0	Bridgewater–Maldon Road (C282 south) – Maldon, Castlemaine, Ballarat	Concurrency with route C282
Victoria	Wimmera River		21.7	13.5	Bridge name unknown	
Victoria	Loddon	Llanelly	26.0	16.2	Bridgewater–Dunolly Road (C274 north) – Bridgewater	Concurrency with route C274
Victoria	Loddon	Tarnagulla	30.1	18.7	Bridgewater–Dunolly Road (C274 south) – Dunolly, Maryborough, Ballarat	Concurrency with route C274
Victoria	Loddon	Tarnagulla	31.8	19.8	Robinvale railway line	
Victoria	Loddon	Moliagul	46.3	28.8	Dunolly–Moliagul Road (C278) – Dunolly	
Victoria	Loddon	Logan	67.5	41.9	Logan–Wedderburn Road (C273) – Wedderburn	
Victoria	Avoca River		69.4	43.1	Bridge name unknown	
Victoria	Northern Grampians	St Arnaud	89.5	55.6	Sunraysia Highway (B220 south) – Donald, Ouyen	Concurrency with route B220
Victoria	Northern Grampians	St Arnaud	90.3	56.1	Sunraysia Highway (B220 north) – Avoca, Ballarat	Concurrency with route B220
Victoria	Northern Grampians	St Arnaud	90.7	56.4	Mildura railway line	
Victoria	Northern Grampians	St Arnaud	95.7	59.5	Ararat–St Arnaud Road (C241) – Ararat	
Victoria	Northern Grampians	Marnoo	129.3	80.3	Donald–Stawell Road – Donald, Stawell	
Victoria	Northern Grampians	Rupanyup	151.9	94.4	Stawell–Warracknabeal Road (B210 south) – Stawell	Concurrency with route B210
Victoria	Northern Grampians	Rupanyup	153.3	95.3	Stawell–Warracknabeal Road (B210 north) – Warracknabeal	Concurrency with route B210
Victoria	Yarriambiack	Murtoa	167.3	104.0	Western SG railway line	
Victoria	Yarriambiack	Murtoa	168.1	104.5	Murtoa–Glenorchy Road (C237 south) – Glenorchy	Concurrency with route C237
Victoria	Yarriambiack	Murtoa	168.6	104.8	Donald–Murtoa Road (C237 north) – Minyip	Concurrency with route C237
Victoria	Horsham	Jung	183.5	114.0	Western SG railway line	
Victoria	Horsham	Dooen	187.9	116.8	Henty Highway (B200 north) – Warracknabeal, Hopetoun	Northern terminus of concurrency with route B200
Victoria	Horsham	Dooen	189.9	118.0	Western SG railway line	
Victoria	Horsham	Horsham	197.8	122.9	Western Highway (A8 west) – Nhill, Bordertown	Southern terminus of concurrency with route B200; Northern terminus of concurrency with routes A8/A200
Victoria	Horsham	Horsham	198.4	123.3	Western Highway (A8/200 south) – Stawell, Ballarat, to Henty Highway (A200 south) – Branxholme, Portland	Southern terminus of concurrency with routes A8/A200
Victoria	Horsham	Vectis	208.3	129.4	Horsham–Noradjuha Road (C214) – Toolondo	
Victoria	Wimmera River		218.6	135.8	Bridge name unknown	
Victoria	Horsham	Natimuk	220.4	137.0	Natimuk–Hamilton Road (C219) – Toolondo, Balmoral	
Victoria	Horsham	Natimuk	223.8	139.1	Natimuk–Frances Road (C213) – Goroke	
Victoria	West Wimmera	Miga Lake	253.3	157.4	Nhill–Harrow Road (C206) – Nhill, Harrow	
Victoria	West Wimmera	Edenhope	289.5	179.9	Kaniva–Edenhope Road (C208 north) – Kaniva	Concurrency with route C208
Victoria	West Wimmera	Edenhope	291.4	181.1	Coleraine–Edenhope Road (C208 south) – Harrow, Casterton	Concurrency with route C208
Victoria	West Wimmera	Edenhope	297.2	184.7	Edenhope–Penola Road (C212) – Langkoop	
Victoria	West Wimmera	Aspley	313.4	194.7	Casterton–Naracoorte Road (C211) – Langkoop, Casterton	
Victoria	West Wimmera	Aspley	323.3	200.9	Wimmera Highway (B240)	Western terminus of route B240
State border			323.3	200.9	Victoria – South Australia state border	
South Australia	Naracoorte Lucindale	Hynam	323.3	200.9	Wimmera Highway (C240)	Eastern terminus of route C240
South Australia	Naracoorte Lucindale	Hynam	334.8	208.0	Frances Road – Frances	
South Australia	Naracoorte Lucindale	Naracoorte	346.1	215.1	Riddoch Highway (A66 north, south) – Mount Gambier, Keith	
South Australia	Naracoorte Lucindale	Naracoorte	346.1	215.1	Lucindale Road (west) – Lucindale, Robe	Western terminus of highway and route C240 at roundabout
1.000 mi = 1.609 km; 1.000 km = 0.621 mi: Concurrency terminus; Route transition

== See also ==
- Highways in Australia
- Highways in South Australia
- Highways in Victoria
