= Newbridge, Victoria =

Newbridge
- Town
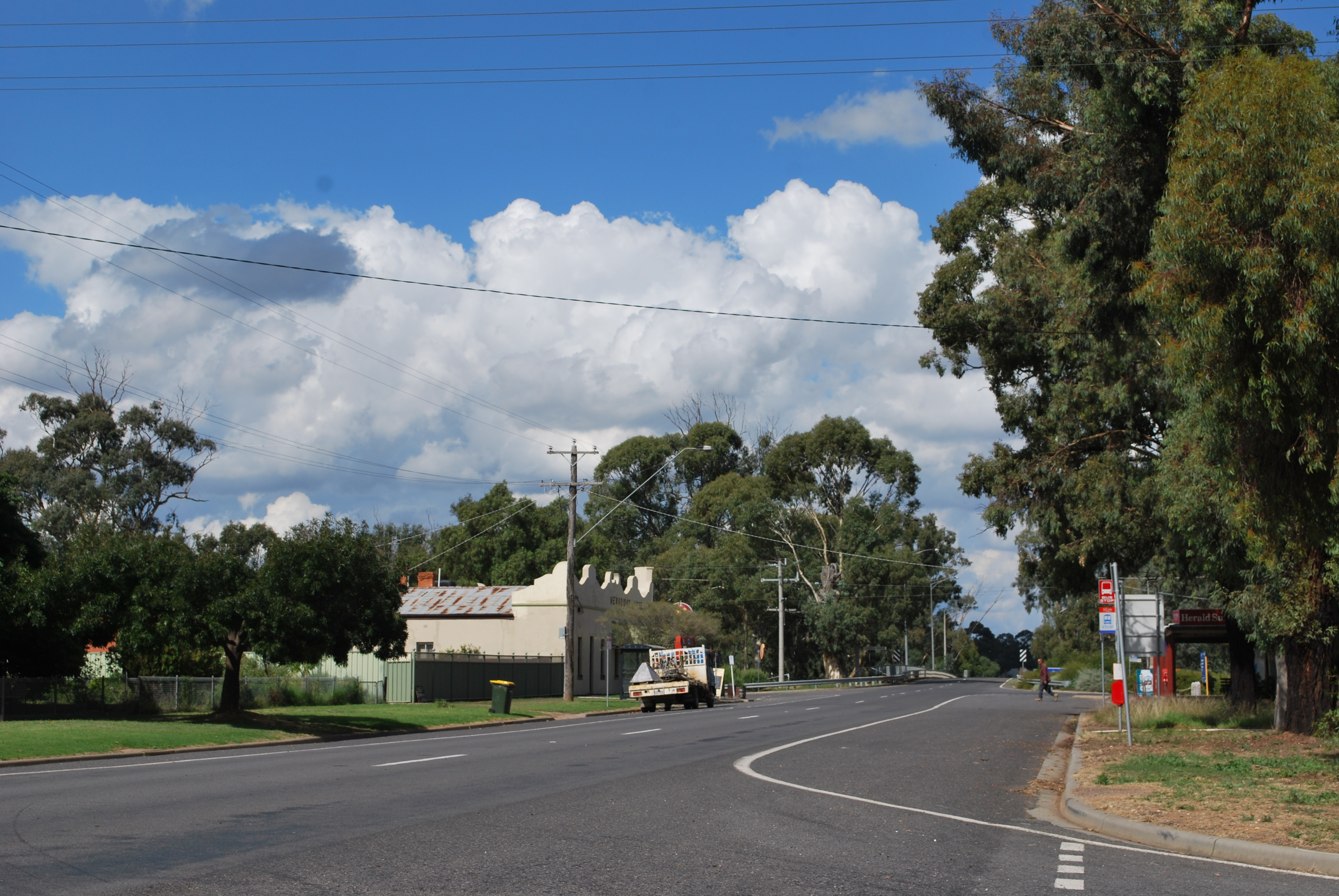
- The Wimmera Highway at Newbridge

- Coordinates: 36°43′59″S 143°55′01″E
- Country: Australia
- State: Victoria
- LGA: Shire of Loddon
- Location: 173 km (107 mi) NW of Melbourne; 37 km (23 mi) W of Bendigo

Government
  - State electorate: Ripon
  - Federal division: Mallee

Population
  - Total: 192 (2016 census)
- Postcode: 3551
Localities around Newbridge
| Llanelly | Bridgewater | Leichardt |
| Tarnagulla | Newbridge | Woodstock |
| Waanyarra | Laanecoorie | Shelbourne |

Newbridge is a town in central Victoria, Australia. The town is located on the Loddon River and in the Shire of Loddon local government area, 173 kilometres (107 mi) north of the state capital, Melbourne. In the 2016 census, Newbridge had a population of 192.

Newbridge was founded as a gold mining town. The Post Office opened on 1 February 1856.

Newbridge is a popular camping and fishing location with campsites available along the river. The town is host to a Family Fishing Bonanza in February and the "Music for the people" event in March.

It is the birthplace of Arthur Wellesley Bayley who, with William Ford discovered the goldfields of Coolgardie in September 1892; Coolgardie being a town in the vicinity of Kalgoorlie in Western Australia.

The Newbridge Football Netball Club known as the Maroons are an Australian Rules football club competing in the Loddon Valley Football League.
