= Northwestern Highway =

Northwestern Highway or North-Western Highway refers to the following:

== United States ==
- M-10 (Michigan highway), a highway near Detroit, Michigan also known as Northwestern Highway;
- Northwestern Highway (auto trail), a highway connecting the states of Illinois and Wyoming.

== Australia ==
- Calder Highway, a highway in Victoria, originally gazetted as North-Western Highway in 1925 and renamed in 1928;
- Sunraysia Highway, a highway in Victoria, originally gazetted as North-Western Highway in 1947-8 and renamed in 1972;
- Mitchell Highway, a highway in New South Wales, originally gazetted as North-Western Highway in 1928 and renamed in 1936.
