= Canegrass =

Canegrass, cane-grass or cane grass is a common name which may refer to the following plants in the family Poaceae:

- Eragrostis australasica – Swamp canegrass
- Eragrostis infecunda – Southern canegrass
- Zygochloa paradoxa – Sandhill canegrass
