= Henty Highway =

Highway in Victoria

Henty Highway Victoria
- Map of south-eastern Australia with Henty Highway highlighted in green
- Coordinates: 35.620084°S 142.581573°E (North end); 38.356509°S 141.611238°E (South end)

General information
- Type: Highway
- Length: 359 km (223 mi)
- Gazetted: November 1914 (as Main Road); August 1938 (as State Highway)
- Route number(s): B200 (1998–present) (Lascelles–Horsham); A200 (1998–present) (Horsham–Portland)
- Former route number: State Route 107 (1986–1998)

Major junctions
- North end: Sunraysia Highway; Lascelles, Victoria
- Borung Highway; Wimmera Highway; Western Highway; Glenelg Highway; Princes Highway
- South end: Madeira Packet Road; Portland, Victoria

Location(s)
- Region: Grampians, Barwon South West
- Major settlements: Hopetoun, Warracknabeal, Horsham, Hamilton, Heywood

Highway system
- Highways in Australia; National Highway • Freeways in Australia; Highways in Victoria

Henty Highway is a rural highway in western Victoria, Australia, linking Lascelles in the Wimmera region, to Portland on the state's south-western coast. It was named in honour of Edward Henty, a British colonist regarded as the first permanent European settler of the Port Phillip District (in what later became the Colony of Victoria), in the town eventually named Portland.

== Route ==
Henty Highway commences at the intersection with Sunraysia Highway in Lascelles, Victoria and heads in a south-westerly direction as a two-lane, single carriageway rural highway, reaching Hopetoun before heading in a southerly direction and passing through Warracknabeal, before meeting Wimmera Highway in Dooen and continues south concurrently with it before reaching the major regional city of Horsham, where it widens to a four-lane road and runs concurrently with Western Highway through the centre of the city, before Wimmera Highway diverts west towards Naracoorte, South Australia a short distance later, and then continues south on its own alignment, through Brimpaen, Cavendish and Hamilton, before meeting Princes Highway in Heywood and continues south concurrently with it until Bolwarra. It continues south on its own alignment until it eventually terminates at the intersection with Madeira Packet Road in the southern suburbs of Portland.

== History ==
The passing of the Country Roads Act 1912 through the Parliament of Victoria provided for the establishment of the Country Roads Board (later VicRoads) and their ability to declare Main Roads, taking responsibility for the management, construction and care of the state's major roads from local municipalities. Hamilton-Portland Road from Hamilton to Branxholme, and Hamilton-Horsham Road from Hamilton to Brimpaen, were declared Main Roads on 16 November 1914, the rest of Hamilton-Portland Road from Branxholme to Bolwarra just north of Portland was declared a Main Road on 30 November 1914, Hopetoun-Warracknabeal Road from Hopetoun to Beulah was declared a Main Road on 14 December 1914, (Horsham-) Dooen Road from Horsham to Dooen and the rest of Hamilton-Horsham Road from Brimpaen to Horsham was declared a Main Road on 17 March 1915, and the rest of Hopetoun-Warracknabeal Road from Warracknabeal to Beulah was declared a Main Road on 31 March 1915.

The passing of the Highways and Vehicles Act 1924 provided for the declaration of State Highways, roads two-thirds financed by the state government through the Country Roads Board. Henty Highway was declared a State Highway in August 1938, cobbled together from roads between Mildura, Warracknabeal, Horsham, and Hamilton to Portland (for a total of 263 miles), subsuming the original declaration of Hamilton-Portland Road, Hamilton-Horsham Road, Horsham-Dooen Road and Hopetoun-Warracknabeal Road as Main Roads; before this declaration, this road was also referred to as Hopetoun(-Lascelles) Road. It originally started from Calder Highway in Nunga, the junction south of Ouyen; when North-Western Highway was renamed Sunraysia Highway on 11 September 1972, and extended from Lascelles to Nunga, Henty Highway was truncated back to Lascelles. The southern end of the highway through Portland was changed in January 1987: from New and Percy and Gawler Streets terminating at the intersection of Gawler, Cliff and Bentick Streets in central Portland, to its current alignment along Port Road and the southern section of Portland-Nelson Road to the intersection with Wellington Road in Portland's southern suburbs.

Henty Highway was signed as State Route 107 between Portland and Lascelles in 1986; with Victoria's conversion to the newer alphanumeric system in the late 1990s, this was replaced by route A200 between Portland and Horsham, and B200 between Horsham and Lascelles.

The passing of the Road Management Act 2004 granted the responsibility of overall management and development of Victoria's major arterial roads to VicRoads: in 2007, VicRoads re-declared the road as Henty Highway (Arterial #6620) between Sunraysia Highway in Lascelles and Madeira Packet Road at Portland.

=== Upgrades ===
- 1949 – 8-mile (13 km) deviation of the Henty Highway as a result of proposed inundation following the construction of the Rocklands Reservoir dam on the Glenelg River, between Cavendish and Cherrypool.

== Major intersections and towns ==
LGA	Location	km	mi	Destinations	Notes
Glenelg	Portland	0.0	0.0	Madeira Packet Road (C194 east) – Port area Henty Highway Link Road (south) – South Portland	Southern terminus of highway and route A200
Glenelg	Portland	2.4	1.5	Madeira Packet Road (C194) – South Portland	
Glenelg	Portland	3.7	2.3	Bridgewater Road (C193 west) – Portland West, Cape Bridgewater; Otway Street (east) – Portland	
Glenelg	Portland	4.7	2.9	Portland–Nelson Road (C192) – Nelson	
Glenelg	Portland	5.0	3.1	Portland railway line	
Glenelg	Portland	6.1	3.8	New Street – Portland	
Glenelg	Bolwarra	8.7	5.4	Princes Highway (A1 east) – Warrnambool, Geelong, Melbourne	Southern terminus of concurrency with route A1
Glenelg	Heathmere	20.6	12.8	Portland railway line	
Glenelg	Heywood	29.5	18.3	Woolsthorpe–Heywood Road (C176/C191) – Woolsthorpe, Warrnambool	
Glenelg	Heywood	30.0	18.6	Princes Highway (A1 west) – Mount Gambier, Adelaide	Northern terminus of concurrency with route A1
Glenelg	Myamyn	46.0	28.6	Myamin–Macarthur Road (C186) – Macarthur	
Glenelg	Myamyn	49.3	30.6	Portland railway line	
Southern Grampians	Hamilton	75.2	46.7	Portland railway line	
Southern Grampians	Hamilton	86.5	53.7	Hamilton–Port Fairy Road (C184) – Port Fairy	
Southern Grampians	Hamilton	87.5	54.4	Dartmoor–Hamilton Road (C187) – Dartmoor	
Southern Grampians	Hamilton	88.3	54.9	Glenelg Highway (B160 east) – Ballarat, Geelong	Concurrency with route B160
Southern Grampians	Hamilton	90.6	56.3	Glenelg Highway (B160 west) – Casterton, Mount Gambier	Concurrency with route B160
Southern Grampians	Cavendish	113	70	Dunkeld–Cavendish Road (C188 northwest) – Dunkeld	Southern terminus of concurrency with route C188
Wannon River		114	71	Bridge name unknown	
Southern Grampians	Cavendish	114	71	Natimuk–Hamilton Road (C188 southeast) – Balmoral	Northern terminus of concurrency with route C188
Glenelg River		169	105	Bridge name unknown	
Horsham	Horsham	215	134	Western Highway (A8 east) – Ararat, Ballarat, Melbourne	Southern terminus of concurrency with route A8
Horsham	Horsham	216	134	Horsham–Lubeck Road (C215) – Longerenong, Lubeck	
Wimmera River		216	134	Bridge name unknown	
Horsham	Horsham	217	135	Wimmera Highway (B240 west) – Edenhope, Naracoorte	Southern terminus of concurrency with route B240
Horsham	Horsham	218	135	Western Highway (A8 west) – Dimboola, Bordertown, Adelaide	Northern terminus of concurrency with route A8; Route transition: route A200 south, route B200 north
Horsham	Dooen	227	141	Wimmera Highway (B240 east) – Murtoa, St Arnaud, Bendigo	Northern terminus of concurrency with route B240
Horsham	Byrneville	244	152	Horsham–Minyip Road (C236) – Minyip, Donald	
Yarriambiack	Warracknabeal	274	170	Stawell–Warracknabeal Road (B210) – Stawell, Melbourne	
Yarriambiack	Warracknabeal	274	170	Borung Highway (C234 west) – Dimboola	Concurrency with route C234
Yarriambiack	Warracknabeal	275	171	Warracknabeal–Rainbow Road (C245 west) – Rainbow; Borung Highway (C234 east) – Donald, Charlton	Concurrency with route C234
Yarriambiack	Beulah	309	192	Birchip–Rainbow Road (C243) – Birchip, Rainbow	
Yarriambiack	Hopetoun	331	206	Hopetoun railway line	
Yarriambiack	Hopetoun	334	208	Hopetoun–Rainbow Road (C227) – Rainbow	
Yarriambiack	Hopetoun	338	210	Hopetoun–Walpeup Road (C247) – Walpeup	
Yarriambiack	Hopetoun	342	213	Hopetoun–Sea Lake Road (C246) – Sea Lake	
Yarriambiack	Lascelles	359	223	Sunraysia Highway (B220) – Ouyen, Mildura	Northern terminus of highway and route B200
1.000 mi = 1.609 km; 1.000 km = 0.621 mi: Concurrency terminus; Route transition

== See also ==
- Highways in Australia
- Highways in Victoria
