= Borung Highway =

Highway in western Victoria, Australia

Borung Highway Victoria
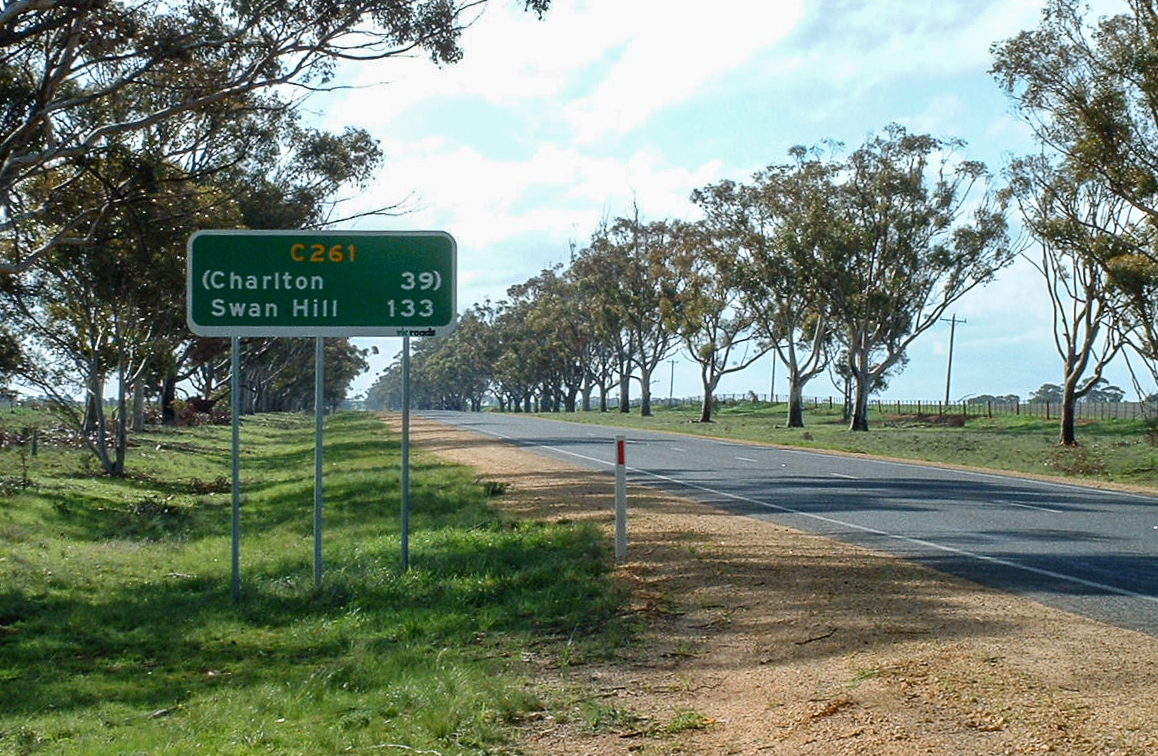
- The highway on the northern edge of Donald
- Coordinates: 36.454707°S 142.035058°E (West end); 36.264917°S 143.349118°E (East end)

General information
- Type: Highway
- Length: 138 km (86 mi)
- Gazetted: May 1915 (as Main Road); 1947/48 (as State Highway)
- Route number(s): C234 (1999–present) (Dimboola–Litchfield); C261 (1999–present) (Donald–Gil Gil); C239 (1999–present) (Gil Gil–Charlton)
- Former route number: State Route 138 (1986–1999); Entire route

Major junctions
- West end: High Street; Dimboola, Victoria
- Western Highway; Henty Highway; Sunraysia Highway
- East end: Calder Highway; Charlton, Victoria

Location(s)
- Region: Grampians, Loddon Mallee
- Major settlements: Warracknabeal, Donald

Highway system
- Highways in Australia; National Highway • Freeways in Australia; Highways in Victoria

Borung Highway is a 138 kilometre rural highway in western Victoria, running in a west–east direction from Dimboola in the west to Charlton in the east.

== Route ==
Borung Highway commences at the roundabout with High Street in Dimboola and heads in a north-easterly direction as a two-lane, single carriageway rural highway, nearly immediately crossing Western Highway and then meeting Henty Highway in Warracknabeal, the heading in an easterly direction until it reaches the intersection with Sunraysia Highway in Litchfield and heads east concurrently with it until Donald, where it heads northeast and then east again on its own alignment, until it eventually terminates at the intersection with Calder Highway in Charlton.

The highway serves little more than connectivity between local communities, and is busiest between the towns of Donald and Charlton (with exception to the 15 km section that it shares with Sunraysia Highway between Donald and Litchfield). The more notable features along the highway exist in the pastoral scenery, and the surprising appearance of lakes amongst the rolling hills. Buloke trees (from which the Shire of Buloke gets its name), are a regular feature along the eastern segment of the road.

It is notable that very few of the highways in Victoria have Aboriginal names. In the nineteenth century amateur scientist and long serving member of the Victorian Legislative Council W. E. Stanbridge made the most detailed record of Australian Aboriginal astronomy surviving. Stanbridge befriended the Booroung people near Lake Tyrrell, and presented the results to Victoria's Scientific Community. The possibilities are that the Borung Highway was named for this tribe, or as is written in the history of the town of Borung the town "takes its name from an Aboriginal word meaning the broad leafed mallee scrub".

== History ==
The passing of the Country Roads Act 1912 through the Parliament of Victoria provided for the establishment of the Country Roads Board (later VicRoads) and their ability to declare Main Roads, taking responsibility for the management, construction and care of the state's major roads from local municipalities. Donald(-Charlton) Road from Donald to Charlton was declared a Main Road on 28 May 1915.

The passing of the Highways and Vehicles Act 1924 provided for the declaration of State Highways, roads two-thirds financed by the state government through the Country Roads Board. Borung Highway was declared a State Highway in the 1947/48 financial year, from Charlton via Donald to Warracknabeal (for a total of 61 miles), subsuming the original declaration of Donald-Charlton Road as a Main Road. In the 1959/60 financial year, another section from Warracknebeal to Dimboola was added, along the former Dimboola-Warracknabeal Road.

Borung Highway was signed as State Route 138 between Dimboola and Charlton in 1986; with Victoria's conversion to the newer alphanumeric system in the late 1990s, this was replaced by route C234 from Dimboola to Donald, C261 from Donald to Gill Gill, and C239 from Gil Gil to Charlton.

The passing of the Road Management Act 2004 granted the responsibility of overall management and development of Victoria's major arterial roads to VicRoads: in 2004, VicRoads re-declared the road as Borung Highway (Arterial #6690) between Western Highway in Dimboola and Calder Highway at Charlton.

Borung-Charlton Road, running east from Charlton to Borung, is often locally referred to as Borung Highway. Although it appears Borung Highway was intended to at least end in Borung, the highway remains a shared single lane roadway without future plans for enhancement. The highway would have then had the township of Borung at one end and the former Shire of Borung (renamed Shire of Warracknabeal in 1938) at the other.

The Shire (which included Warracknabeal) was originally named the Shire of Borung in 1891 when it was split off from the Shire of St. Arnaud. The name was changed due to confusion in mail deliveries with the township of Borung, and during Victorian Council amalgamations in 1995 it was changed again to the Shire of Yarriambiack. The Shire of Borung did not include Dimboola but the larger County of Borung does.

== Major intersections ==
LGA	Location	km	mi	Destinations	Notes
Hindmarsh	Dimboola	0.0	0.0	High Street (C227) – Dimboola	Western terminus of highway and route C234
Hindmarsh	Dimboola	0.0	0.0	Western Highway (A8) – Horsham, Nhill, Melbourne, Adelaide	
Yarriambiack	Wallup	20.0	12.4	Horsham–Kalkee Road (C231) – Horsham	
Yarriambiack	Warracknabeal	39.0	24.2	Henty Highway (B200 south) – Horsham, Stawell	Concurrency with route B200
Yarriambiack	Warracknabeal	39.8	24.7	Henty Highway (B200 north) – Hopetoun, Mildura; Warracknabeal–Rainbow Road (C245 west) – Rainbow	Concurrency with route B200
Yarriambiack	Warracknabeal	42.4	26.3	Warracknabeal–Birchip Road (C242) – Birchip	
Buloke	Litchfield	81.5	50.6	Sunraysia Highway (B220 north) – Birchip, Ouyen, Mildura	Eastern terminus of route C234; Western terminus of concurrency with route B220
Buloke	Donald	96.5	60.0	Sunraysia Highway (B220 south) – St Arnaud, Avoca, Ballarat	Southern terminus of route C261; Eastern terminus of concurrency with route B220
Buloke	Donald–Gil Gil–Jeffcott North tripoint	106.0	65.9	Donald–Swan Hill Road (C261 north) – Swan Hill	Western terminus of route C239, route C261 continues north along Donald–Swan Hill Road
Buloke	Wooroonook	124.0	77.1	St Arnaud–Wycheproof Road (C271 north) – Wycheproof	Concurrency with route C271
Buloke	Wooroonook	124.7	77.5	St Arnaud–Wycheproof Road (C271 south) – St Arnaud	Concurrency with route C271
Buloke	Charlton	137.6	85.5	Calder Highway (A79) – Wycheproof, Mildura, Bendigo, Melbourne	Eastern terminus of highway and route C239
1.000 mi = 1.609 km; 1.000 km = 0.621 mi: Concurrency terminus; Route transition

== See also ==
- Highways in Australia
- Highways in Victoria
