= Lake Batyo Catyo =

- Location within Victoria
- Location: North Central Victoria
- Coordinates: 36°30′54″S 142°56′21″E
- Type: reservoir
- Primary inflows: Souths Creek, Richardson River
- Primary outflows: Donald Channel
- Basin countries: Australia
- Surface area: 2.3 km^{2} (0.89 sq mi)
- Average depth: 2.5 m (8 ft 2 in)
- Settlements: St Arnaud, Donald

Lake Batyo Catyo is a human-made freshwater lake located 26 km west of the town of St Arnaud in North Central Victoria, Australia. It is now dry, as the inflow channel from the Richardson River was permanently closed in 2012.

The lake surface covered 230 hectares to an average depth of 2.5 metres. It is the terminus for water flowing from the Richardson River via Souths Creek and three smaller reservoirs to its southwest.

== History ==
The lake was constructed in 1961 as an irrigation reservoir for dairying and for cereal crops. Water was diverted from the Richardson River during high-flow periods to create a reservoir holding an average of 1,130 ML and a maximum of 2,250 ML. The lake was used for waterskiing and other recreational and tourist activities based in the nearby towns of Donald and St. Arnaud.

However, in 2010, the Wimmera Mallee Pipeline was completed, meaning water storage at Batyo Catyo was no longer necessary. In 2012, Richardson River diversion rules were changed so water no longer flowed into Batyo Catyo, and the inflow from Rich Avon Weir was permanently closed.

In 2020, local communities began campaigning to restore water to Lake Batyo Catyo for recreational purposes.

== Fauna ==
Now dry, the lake was home to communities of Murray cod, golden perch and redfin perch, though fish habitat can be affected by drought conditions.

== Flora ==
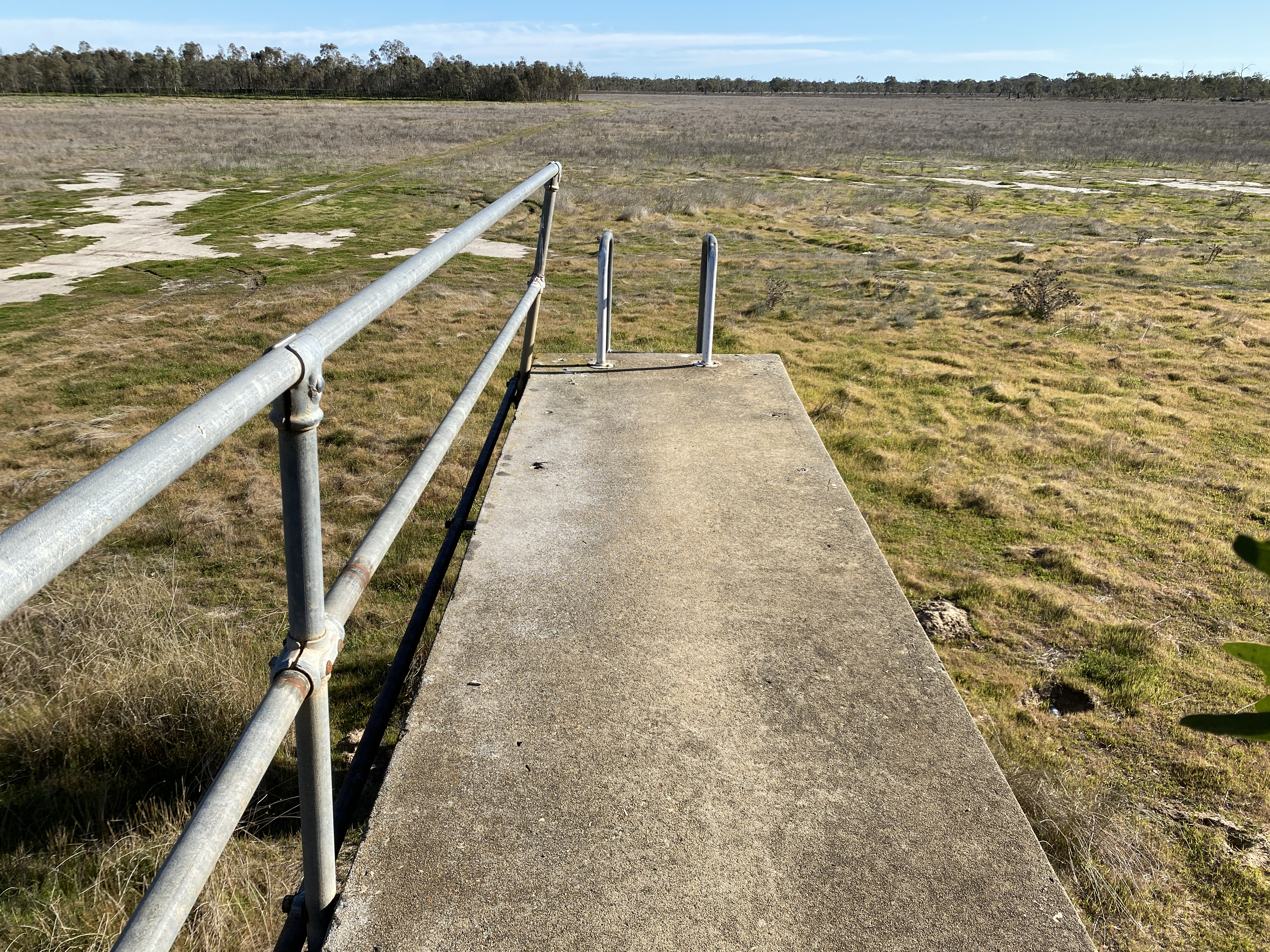
A dilapidated concrete jetty with a galvanised steel railing on the left hand side sticks out over a dry lake bed. At the end of the jetty the top of a metal ladder is visible. The lake bed is covered in grass, with a few sandy patches. On the left hand side, some tyre tracks are visible. A former sand bar and the distant lake shore are covered in trees.

Native flora include species common to grassy wetlands. The shoreline is dominated by river red gum (Eucalyptus camaldulensis) associated with canegrass (Eragrostis infecunda) tangled lignum (Muehlenbeckia florulenta) and spiny sedge (Cyperus gymnocaulus). The southern and southwestern shore is also home to stands of black box (Eucalyptus largiflorens) Three threatened species are present: the pale spike sedge (Eleocharis pallens), chariot wheels (Maireana cheeli) and turnip copperbur (Sclerolaena napiformis). Upstream land clearing in the 1960s has increased salinity levels in the lake, but a 2006 water quality study indicated sufficient fresh water to maintain existing vegetation.

== Media ==
Aerial footage of Lake Batyo Catyo, Victoria, Australia - 16 Oct, 2016 (no audio), taken using a Phantom 3 quadcopter at 4K resolution. Footage starts near ground level but reaches a max height of 120 metres (as per CASA rules), includes a couple of 360 degree turns to show the park and surrounds and then finishes looking down upon the (very neglected) facilities at the park.
