= John Ogburn =

Australian painter

John Armstrong Ogburn
- Born: 4 June 1925; St Arnaud, Victoria, Australia
- Died: 13 January 2010 (aged 84)
- Occupation: painter

John Armstrong Ogburn (4 June 1925 – 13 January 2010) was an Australian painter.

== Biography ==
Born in St Arnaud, Victoria in 1925, Ogburn worked for Shell Co. in Melbourne as an industrial research chemist between 1944 and 1946. During that time he became what he called a "Sunday painter" in oils and watercolours, and did life drawing at the Victorian Artists Society studio. In 1946 he "realised that the life of an industrial chemist ignored, by-passed, or denied those very things in life most valuable to me", so he bought a scooter and travelled to Northern Queensland, where he worked in the sugarcane fields and on pearling luggers and timber boats off Cairns and Cooktown. After returning to Sydney in 1948, he worked for The Sydney Morning Herald as a freelance science correspondent, while studying under the painter Desiderius Orban and the philosopher Austin Woodbury.

Following his first one-man exhibition at the Macquarie Galleries in 1953, Ogburn sailed to Europe, hitch-hiking, working, and studying in museums and galleries. On returning in 1957, he conducted an art teaching studio in Sydney, and was Vice President of the Contemporary Art Society from 1957 to 1962.

In 1963 he opened the John Ogburn Studio of painting and drawing in Lower George Street Sydney, moving to Harrington Street, The Rocks, New South Wales, in 1972. In 1973 he founded the Harrington Street Artists' Co-operative Gallery, where he held a one-man exhibition annually, until his final exhibition in October 2009, a few months before his death.

Although not widely known in Australia, John Ogburn received acclaim and admiration from art critics such as Clement Greenberg who wrote, "I gathered that he wasn’t widely accepted in Australia – because he wasn’t 'new' enough, 'far out' enough. You Australians may be as benighted as we Americans are."
