= Sunraysia Highway =

Highway in Victoria

Sunraysia Highway Victoria
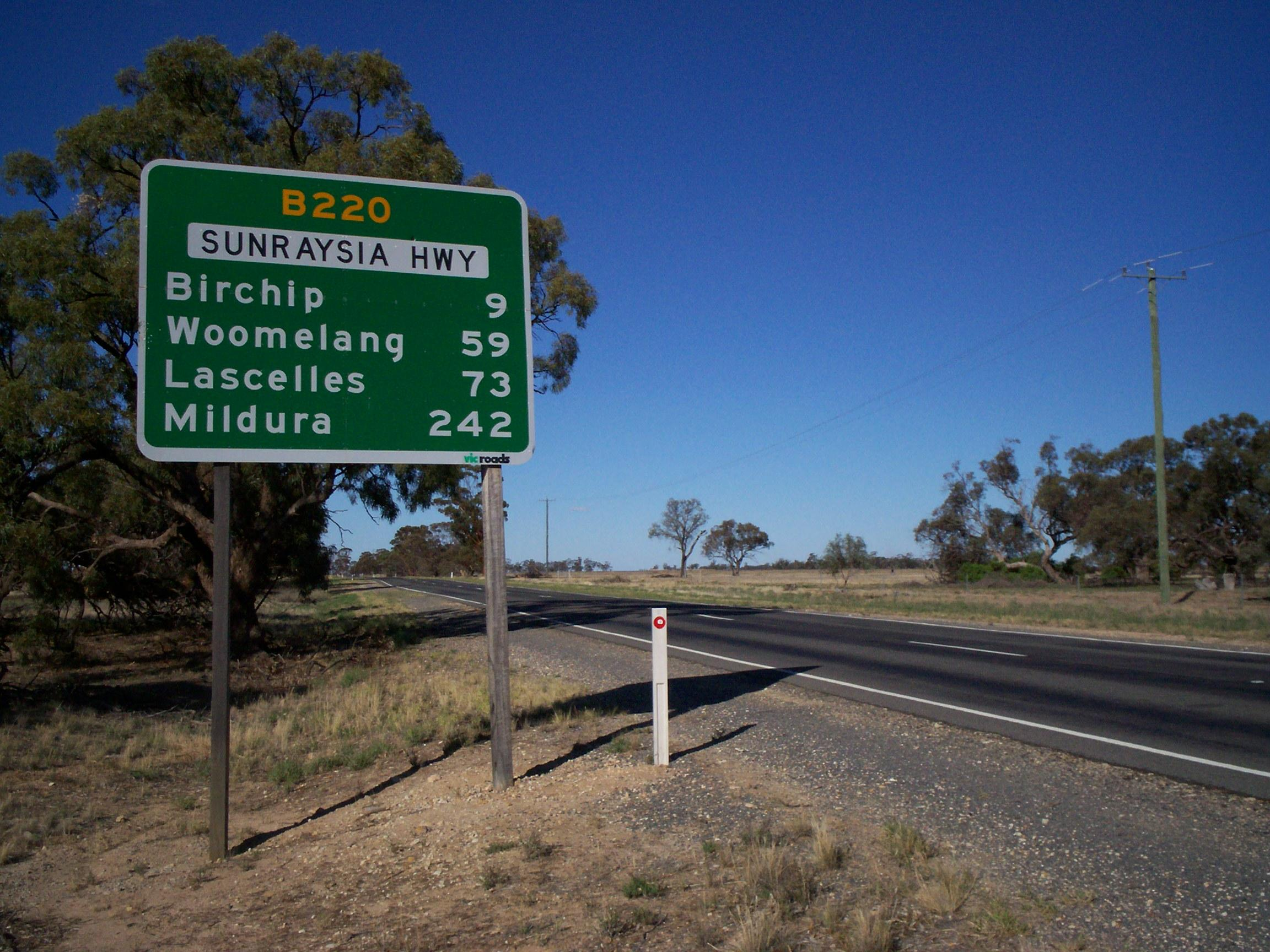
- Sunraysia Highway, just outside Birchip
- Coordinates: 35.158220°S 142.370114°E (North end); 37.489956°S 143.787629°E (South end)

General information
- Type: Highway
- Length: 330.2 km (205 mi)
- Gazetted: December 1914 (as Main Road); 1947/48 (as State Highway)
- Route number(s): B220 (1998–present)
- Former route number: State Route 121 (1986–1998)

Major junctions
- North end: Calder Highway; Ouyen, Victoria
- Henty Highway; Borung Highway; Borung Highway; Wimmera Highway; Pyrenees Highway
- South end: Western Freeway; Mitchell Park, Victoria

Location(s)
- Region: Loddon Mallee, Grampians
- Major settlements: Speed, Lascelles, Woomelang, Birchip, Donald, St Arnaud, Avoca, Lexton

Highway system
- Highways in Australia; National Highway • Freeways in Australia; Highways in Victoria

Sunraysia Highway (route B220) is a 330 kilometres (205 mi) north–south rural highway in western Victoria, linking Ouyen to the north-western Ballarat suburb of Mitchell Park, and acts as a secondary route to Calder Highway, the main route between Melbourne and Mildura. It serves a number of important industries in the region such as agriculture, viticulture, food processing, winemaking and tourism. It forms an important link for these industries to markets and ports in the south of Victoria and South Australia.

== Route ==
Sunraysia Highway commences at the intersection with Calder Highway and heads in a southerly direction as a two-lane, single carriageway rural highway, mostly following the course of Mildura railway line through the eastern Wimmera region. It meets Henty Highway in Lascelles, takes a more south-easterly direction through Birchip and meets Borung Highway in Donald and then Wimmera Highway in St Arnaud, before heads again in a southerly direction, meeting Pyrenees Highway in Avoca and heading again in a south-easterly direction until it eventually terminates at the interchange with Western Freeway on the north-western borders of Ballarat at Mitchell Park.

== History ==
Within Victoria, the passing of the Country Roads Act 1912 through the Parliament of Victoria provided for the establishment of the Country Roads Board (later VicRoads) and their ability to declare Main Roads, taking responsibility for the management, construction and care of the state's major roads from local municipalities. Beulah-Birchip-Wycheproof Road was declared a Main Road from Ballapur to Birchip (and continuing westwards from Ballapur to Beulah, and eastwards to Wycheproof) on 14 December 1914; St Arnaud-(Donald-)Birchip Road was declared a Main Road, between Donald and Birchip on 28 May 1915, and between St Arnaud and Donald on 20 September 1915; Ballarat-(Lexton-)(Avoca-)St Arnaud Road was declared a Main Road, between Addington through Lexton and Avoca to Redbank on 31 May 1915, and from north-western Ballarat to Addington and from Redbank to St Arnaud on 20 September 1915.

The passing of the Highways and Vehicles Act 1924 provided for the declaration of State Highways, roads two-thirds financed by the state government through the Country Roads Board. North-Western Highway (not to be confused by Calder Highway, which was also known as North-Western Highway in the late 1920s) was declared a State Highway in the 1947/48 financial year, from Ballarat via Avoca, St Arnaud, and Donald to Birchip (for a total of 138 miles), subsuming the original declarations of Ballarat-Lexton-Avoca-St Arnaud Road and St Arnaud-Donald-Birchip Road as Main Roads. In the 1959/60 financial year, another section from Birchip via Woomelang to Lascelles was added, subsuming the original declaration of Beulah-Birchip-Wycheproof between Ballapur and Birchip as a Main Road, along the former Kinnabulla-Woomelang Road and Woomelang-Lascelles Roads. The name of the highway was later changed to Sunraysia Highway on 11 September 1972, and extended from Lascelles to the intersection with Calder Highway in Nunga, southern Ouyen, subsuming the former portion of Henty Highway between Lascelles and Nunga.

Sunraysia Highway was signed as State Route 121 between Ouyen and Ballarat in 1986; with Victoria's conversion to the newer alphanumeric system in the late 1990s, it was replaced by route B220.

The passing of the Road Management Act 2004 granted the responsibility of overall management and development of Victoria's major arterial roads to VicRoads: in 2013, VicRoads re-declared the road as Sunraysia Highway (Arterial #6700) between Calder Highway in Ouyen and Western Freeway at Mitchell Park in north-western Ballarat.

== Major intersections and towns ==
LGA	Location	km	mi	Destinations	Notes
Mildura	Ouyen	0.0	0.0	Calder Highway (A79) – Mildura, Bendigo	Northern terminus of highway and route B220
Yarriambiack	Speed	28.1	17.5	Patchewollock–Sea Lake Road (C248) – Patchewollock, Ninda	
Yarriambiack	Lascelles	54.9	34.1	Mildura railway line	
Yarriambiack	Lascelles	55.9	34.7	Henty Highway (B200) – Warracknabeal	
Yarriambiack	Woomelang	68.7	42.7	Hopetoun–Sea Lake Road (C246) – Hopetoun, Sea Lake	
Yarriambiack	Woomelang	68.8	42.8	Mildura railway line	
Yarriambiack	Woomelang	69.5	43.2	Mildura railway line	
Buloke	Ballapur	107.0	66.5	Birchip–Rainbow Road (C243) – Rainbow	
Buloke	Birchip	118.3	73.5	Birchip–Sea Lake Road (C244 north) – Sea Lake; Birchip–Wycheproof Road (C268 east) – Wycheproof	
Buloke	Morton Plains	128.0	79.5	Warracknabeal–Birchip (C242) – Warracknabeal	
Buloke	Massey	147.7	91.8	Mildura railway line	
Buloke	Litchfield	156.1	97.0	Borung Highway (C234 west) – Warracknabeal	
Buloke	Donald	164.4	102.2	Mildura railway line	
Buloke	Donald	170.5	105.9	Donald–Stawell Road (C238) – Marnoo, Stawell	
Buloke	Donald	171.2	106.4	Borung Highway (C261 east) – Charlton, Swan Hill	
Buloke	Donald	172.9	107.4	Mildura railway line	
Northern Grampians	St Arnaud	186.2	115.7	Mildura railway line	
Northern Grampians	St Arnaud	209.2	130.0	St Arnaud–Wycheproof Road (C271 northwest) – Wycheproof; Charlton–Wycheproof Road (C272 northeast) – Charlton	
Northern Grampians	St Arnaud	209.8	130.4	Inkerman Street (B240) – Marnoo, Horsham	Concurrency with route B240
Northern Grampians	St Arnaud	210.6	130.9	Inglewood Road (B240) – Tarnagulla, Marong, Bendigo	Concurrency with route B240
Northern Grampians	Moyreisk	242.5	150.7	Maryborough–St Arnaud Road (C275) – Maryborough	
Pyrenees	Tanwood	258.8	160.8	Stawell–Avoca Road (C221) – Stawell, Navarre	
Avoca River		268.3	166.7	Vale Bridge	
Pyrenees	Avoca	270.4	168.0	Avoca railway line	
Pyrenees	Avoca	271.4	168.6	Pyrenees Highway (B180) – Maryborough, Castlemaine, Ararat	
Pyrenees	Lexton	294.6	183.1	Lexton–Talbot Road (C172 east) – Talbot; Beaufort–Lexton Road (C172 west) – Beaufort	
Ballarat	Mitchell Park–Miners Rest boundary	330.2	205.2	Western Freeway (M8) – Horsham, Ararat, Bacchus Marsh, Melbourne	Southern terminus of highway and route B220 at trumpet interchange
1.000 mi = 1.609 km; 1.000 km = 0.621 mi: Concurrency terminus; Route transition

== See also ==
- Highways in Australia
- Highways in Victoria
- Sunraysia
