= Maurie Wood =

Australian rules footballer

Personal information
- Full name: Maurie Wood
- Born: 30 June 1944
- Original team: St Arnaud
- Height: 179 cm (5 ft 10 in)
- Weight: 73 kg (161 lb)
- Position: Half forward

Playing career^{1}
Years	Club	Games (Goals)
1963–71	North Melbourne	97 (77)
- ^{1} Playing statistics correct to the end of 1971.

Maurie Wood (born 30 June 1944) is a former Australian rules footballer who played with North Melbourne in the Victorian Football League (VFL).

He was recruited by North Melbourne from the Central Wimmera town of St. Arnaud. From 1963 to 1971 Maurie managed to play 97 games before retiring and returning to St Arnaud.

Back in his hometown, Maurie became a fixture for the local football club, playing in 184 games and winning the club best and fairest three times. He would take training for the seniors and teach how to play to the juniors.

He was rewarded by having a mural painted of him and stating his achievements.
