= Brimpaen =

- Town
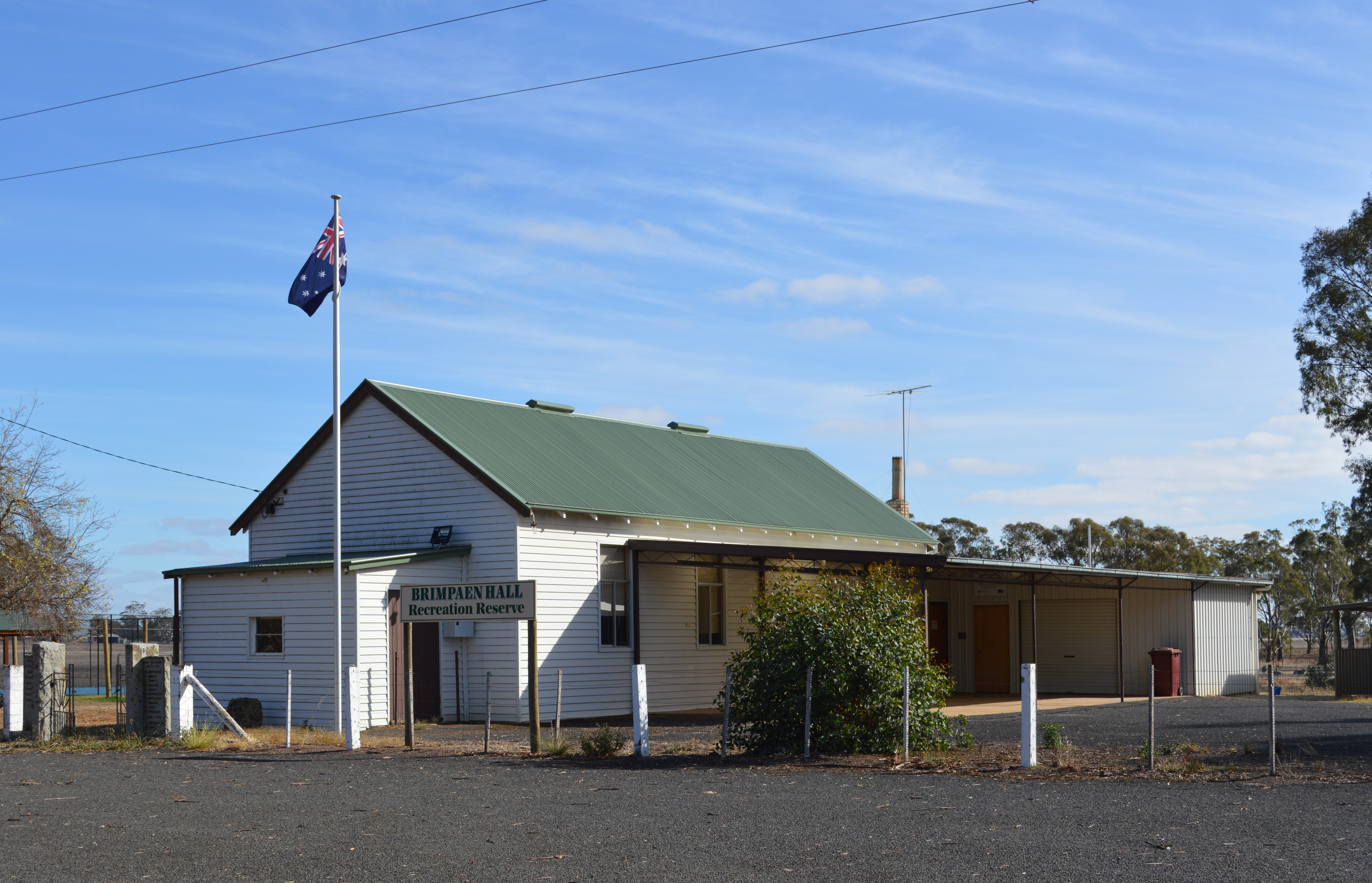
- The public hall at Brimpaen

- Coordinates: 37°03′28″S 142°21′6″E
- Country: Australia
- State: Victoria
- LGA: Rural City of Horsham
- Location: 309 km (192 mi) W of Melbourne; 202 km (126 mi) W of Ballarat; 42 km (26 mi) S of Horsham

Government
  - State electorate: Ripon
  - Federal division: Wannon

Population
  - Total: 80 (2016 census)
- Postcode: 3400

Brimpaen is a locality situated in the Wimmera region of western Victoria, Australia. The Henty Highway between Mildura and Portland passes through the locality. At the 2021 census, Brimpaen and the surrounding area had a population of 80.

Brimpaen Post Office opened on 1 May 1886 and closed in September 1957.
