= St Arnaud Mercury =

Former newspaper published in St Arnaud, Victoria, Australia

The St Arnaud Mercury was a newspaper first published on 13 February 1864 by the proprietors, Evans and Somerton, who also owned the Maryborough Advertiser.

It was purchased in 1868 by mining entrepreneur Charles Ferris Lewis (1828–1900). He bound yearly volumes and donated them to the Borough Council of St Arnaud, the Shire of Kara Kara and the Mechanics' Institute. The Lewis family owned the paper for 61 years with his two sons, (eponymously named) Charles Ferris and Thomas George, continued the Mercury until 1929.

Printer, journalist and parliamentarian Edward William O'Sullivan (1864–1910) worked as an editor for the paper for about three years before going to The Argus in 1879.

Now serving the region is the North Central News which published a 32-page supplement on 28 September 2005, to mark the 150th anniversary of St Arnaud. Two pages were devoted to articles and photographs related to the history of newspapers in the town and the neighbouring Charlton.

== Archives ==
Excluding a six-day gap from 26 December 1876, the microfilm archive of the newspaper held at the State Library of Victoria spans uninterrupted from 5 March 1864 to 24 December 1976.

== See also ==
- List of newspapers in Australia
