= Arthur Wellesley Bayley =

Arthur Wellesley Bayley

Arthur Bayley (28 March 1865 – 29 October 1896) was a gold prospector who discovered gold at Fly Flat, Western Australia on 17 September 1892, around which the town of Coolgardie grew.

== Early life ==
Bayley was born in Newbridge, Victoria, son of John Bayley, a butcher, and his wife Rosanna.

== Prospecting in Western Australia ==
Bayley's reward claim proved to be a very profitable one indeed, and was continually worked until 1963. During the 70 years of its existence this mining claim recovered over 500,000 troy ounces (16 thousand kilograms) of gold.
