= Dooen =

- Town
- Coordinates: 36°40′S 142°17′E
- Country: Australia
- State: Victoria
- LGA: Rural City of Horsham
- Location: 311 km (193 mi) NW of Melbourne; 9 km (5.6 mi) NW of Horsham

Government
  - State electorate: Lowan
  - Federal division: Mallee

Population
  - Total: 250 (2021 census)
- Postcode: 3401

Dooen /ˈduən/ is a locality situated in the Wimmera region, Western Victoria, Australia. The Henty Highway between Mildura and Portland passes through the Dooen. At the 2021 census, Dooen had a population of 250.

Dooen Post Office opened on 1 September 1877 and closed in 1982. The Old Dooen pub is one of the few remaining occupied buildings and is popular amongst the agricultural students of Longerenong College. The Dooen School closed in 1994, the Dooen Hall is all that remains on the site.

== Communications ==
The ABC Western Victoria transmitter at Dooen, named 594 3WV, was built in 1936. The mast is 201 metres tall and the transmitter generates 50 kilowatts of power, with only 13 other more powerful broadcast towers in Australia. The lattice work at the top of the mast is 19 metres in diameter.

== Transport ==
The Wimmera Intermodal Freight Terminal (a.k.a. inland port) opened on the Western standard gauge line at Dooen in August 2012. By 2014 over 700 ISO containers were moving through the terminal each week, on one of nine weekly intermodal trains between Melbourne and Dooen.
