= Llanelly, Victoria =

Llanelly
- Town
- Coordinates: 36°44′12″S 143°51′25″E
- Country: Australia
- State: Victoria
- LGA: Shire of Loddon

Government
  - State electorate: Ripon
  - Federal division: Mallee

Population
  - Total: 62 (2021 census)
- Postcode: 3551

Llanelly is a locality in the Shire of Loddon, Victoria, Australia. At the 2021 census, Llanelly had a population of 62.

== History ==
Gold mining in the Tarnagulla district began in 1853, and in 1856 gold was discovered at a nearby rise known as Hard Hills, west of the present site of Llanelly. Further reef discoveries followed over the next two years around and east of Llanelly, encouraging permanent settlement, and by about 1860 a village had formed and was named Llanelly by Welsh miners. The discovery of alluvial gold in 1865 led to rapid population growth, and at its peak the Llanelly goldfields were reported to support a population of up to 20,000 people. For decades, Welsh, rather than English, was the dominant language of Llanelly.

The expansion of the goldfields supported the development of stores, hotels and banks, and the town remained prosperous until declining yields in the following decade slowed growth. Between 1872 and 1882 the settlement was officially known as Maidentown, before the name Llanelly was reinstated prior to the opening of the railway line from Dunolly in 1888. By the 1920s most local businesses had closed apart from the post office and general store, and the town's role as a service centre continued to diminish. The opening of a grain silo at the railway station in 1951 reflected a shift away from small mixed farming, while the school had closed in 1950 and was later converted into a public hall.
