= Waanyarra =

Waanyarra Victoria
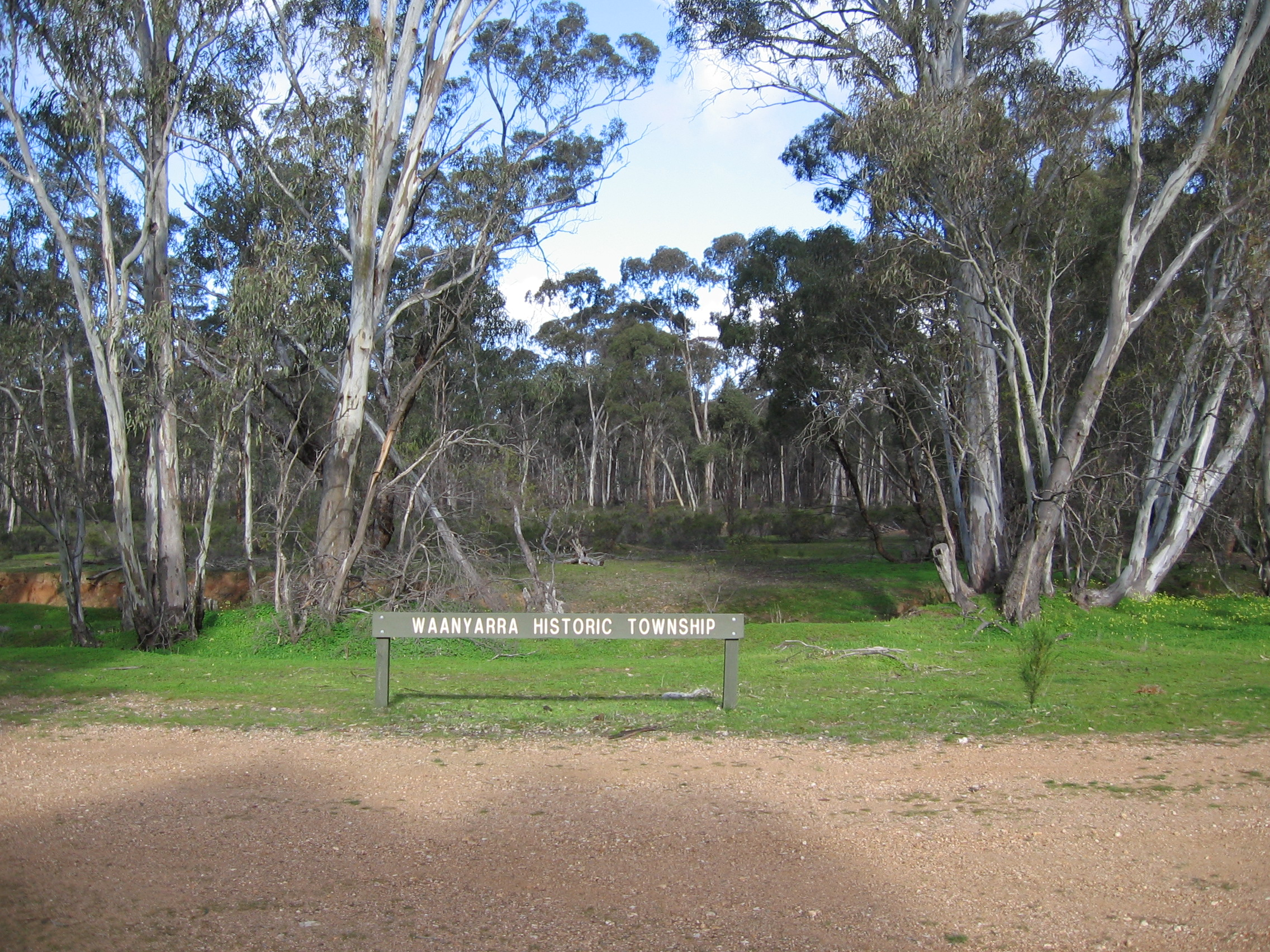
- A sign marking "The Historic Township of Waanyarra"

- Coordinates: 36°50′S 143°50′E
- Population: 57 (2021 census)
- Postcode(s): 3516
- Location: 178 km (111 mi) NW of Melbourne; 49 km (30 mi) W of Bendigo; 9 km (6 mi) S of Tarnagulla
- LGA(s): Shire of Loddon
- State electorate(s): Ripon
- Federal division(s): Mallee

Waanyarra is a locality in the Shire of Loddon, Victoria, Australia, 178 kilometres (111 mi) north west of the state capital, Melbourne and 39 kilometres (24 mi) west of Bendigo. At the 2021 census, Waanyarra had a population of 57.

Originally a small township existed here which arose due to the discovery of gold. Commencing in the 1860s, the township supported 2 hotels, several stores, a school and a post office, which remained open until the 1920s. Nothing now remains other than foundations, an old cemetery and recreation reserve.
