= Tarnagulla =

- Town
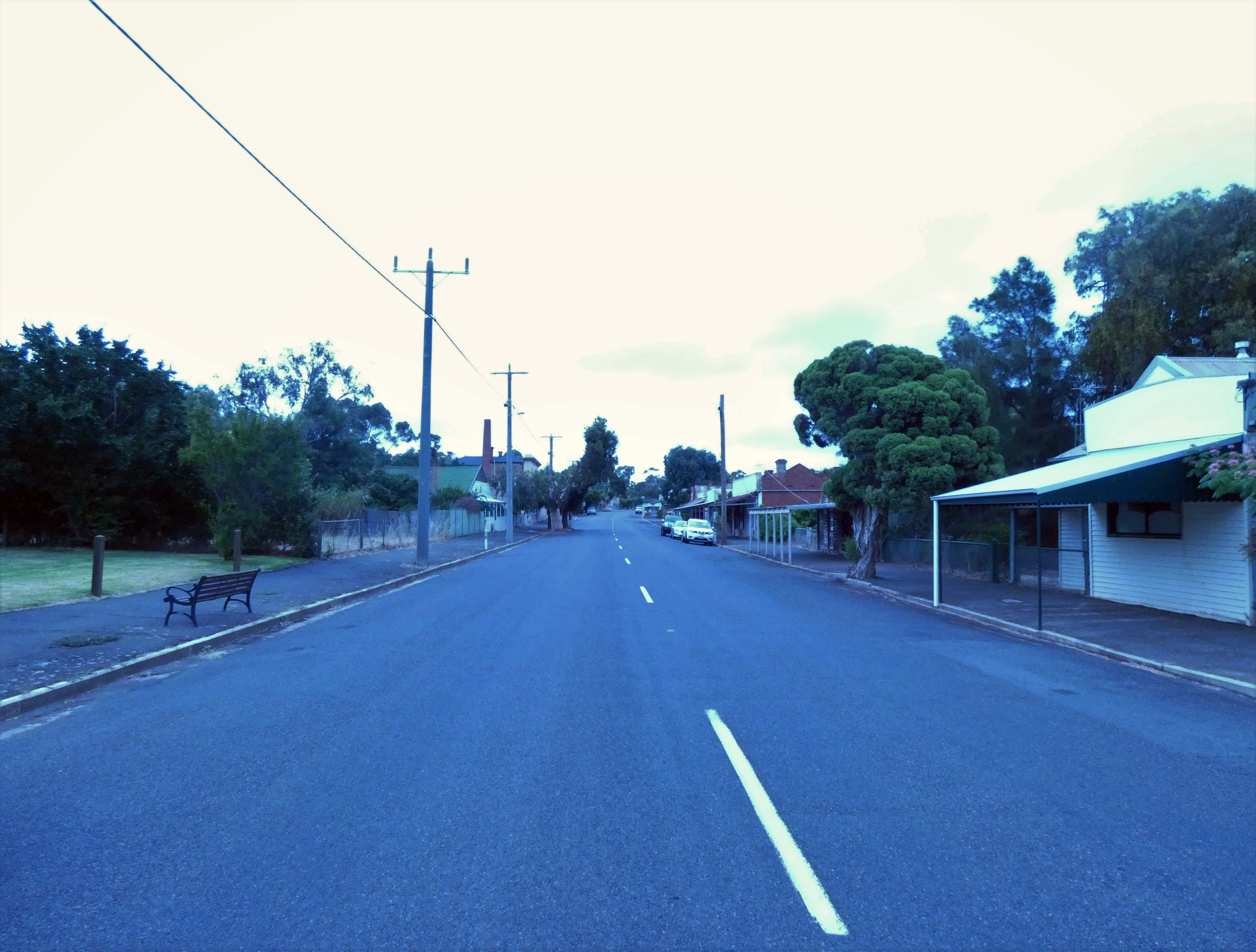
- Commercial Road, the main street of Tarnagulla in 2022

- Coordinates: 36°46′0″S 143°49′0″E
- Country: Australia
- State: Victoria
- LGA: Shire of Loddon
- Location: 183 km (114 mi) NW of Melbourne; 47 km (29 mi) W of Bendigo; 15 km (9.3 mi) NE of Dunolly

Government
  - State electorate: Ripon
  - Federal division: Mallee

Population
  - Total: 133 (2016 census)
- Postcode: 3551
Localities around Tarnagulla
| Murphy's Creek | Llanelly | Newbridge |
| Moliagul | Tarnagulla | Woodstock |
| Waanyarra | Eddington | Laanecoorie |

Tarnagulla is a town in central Victoria, Australia. The town is in the Shire of Loddon local government area, 183 kilometres (114 mi) north west of the state capital, Melbourne. At the 2011 census, Tarnagulla had a population of 304. By 2016, the population was 133. According to the 2021 Census, the population was 153.

== History ==
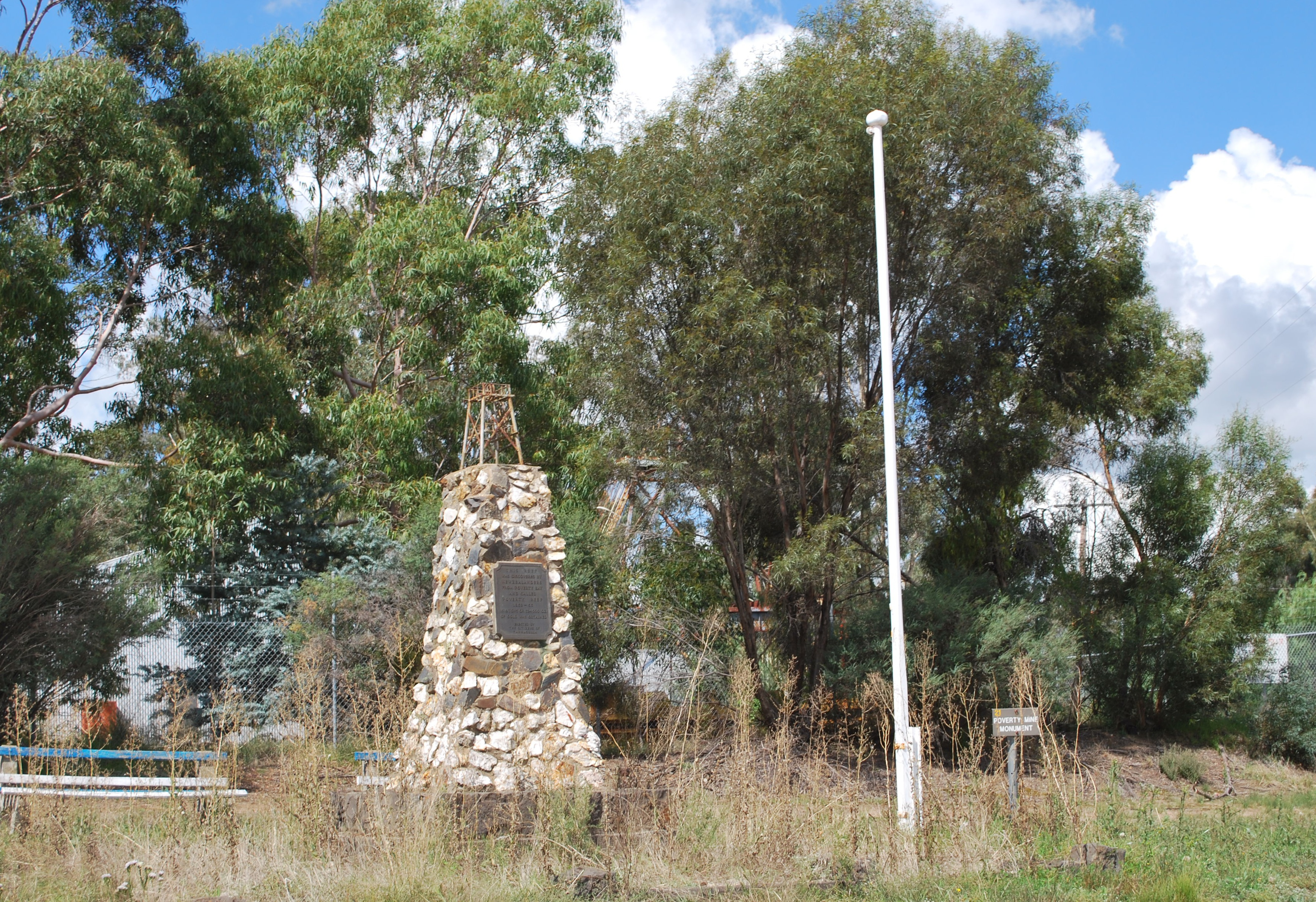
A monument to the Poverty Mine

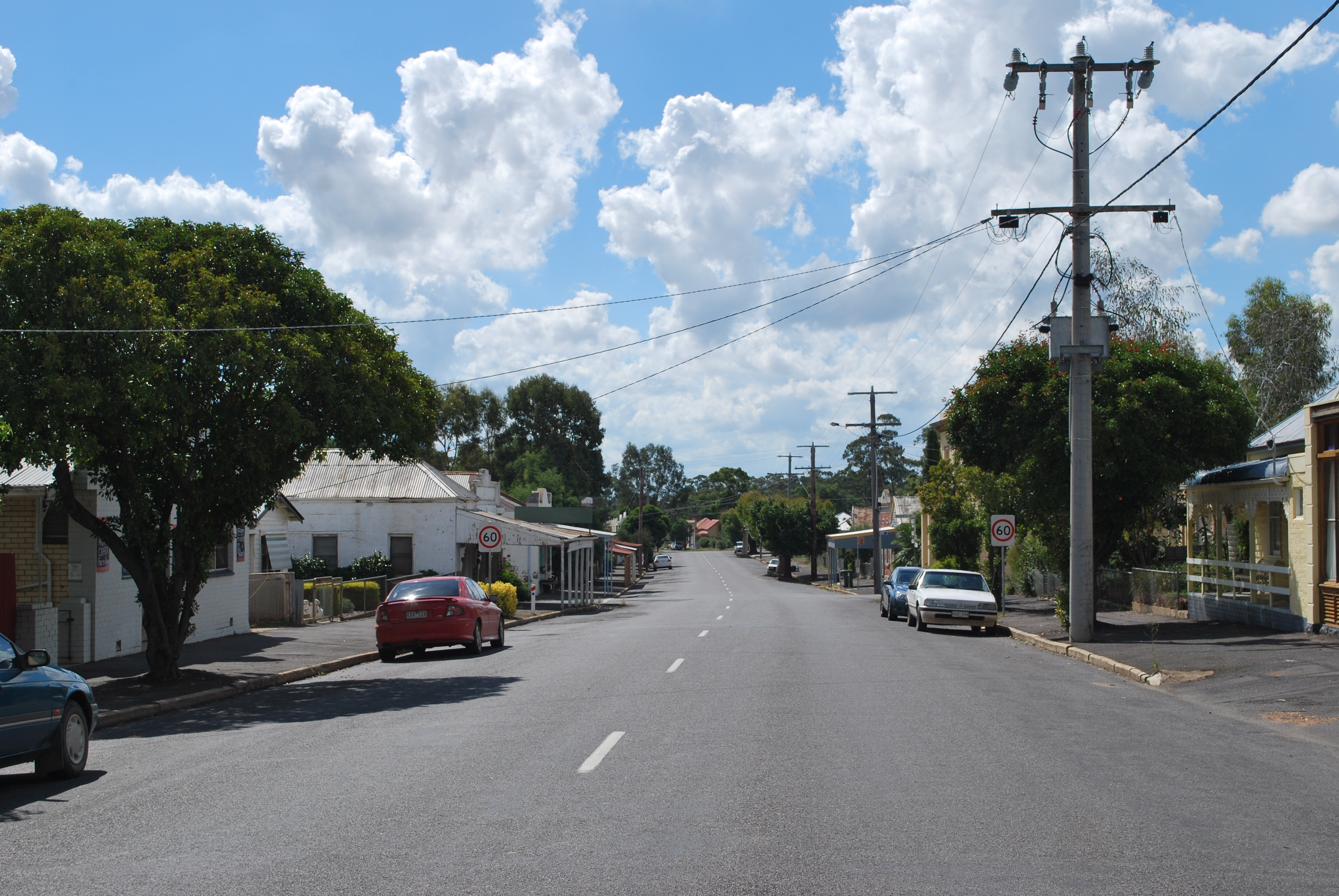
Commercial Road in 2011

European settlement in the area began with the taking up of Tarnagulla station in the 1840s. Gold was first found in the area in 1852 by prospectors on their way to the Korong goldfields near Wedderburn. The discovery led to a gold rush, as more than 5,000 miners made their way to the diggings. The settlement created by these miners was at first known as Sandy Creek and was renamed Tarnagulla, after the station in 1860. Reflecting this, the Post Office opened on 13 August 1856 as Sandy Creek and was renamed Tarnagulla on 2 January 1861.

Tarnagulla is phonetic meaning of Polish Czarnogóra (eng. Black Mountain - Montenegro). Name was given by Polish explorer and geologist Paweł Strzelecki.

The first miners in the area were prospectors from South Australia followed by many more from other diggings and from around the world. A canvas town grew up quickly to service the needs of the miners. In 1853, the first gold nuggets were found near Tarnagulla at Nuggetty Gully with one pair of miners finding 86 lb (39 kg) of gold in a fourteen-day period. Many other large nuggets including one weighing 32 lb (14.5 kg) were found in the area.

From 1854, the focus of the miners turned to quartz mining with the discovery of the Poverty Reef. The reef was named by one of its discoverers, Mr. Hatt, in remembrance of Poverty Bay, New Zealand where he had been saved from drowning by a Māori woman. The Poverty lode was unusual in that the gold was found in large blocks of quartz. Allegedly the richest pocket of reef gold ever found, more than 13.5 tonnes (430,000 ozt) of gold was recovered from Poverty Reef in 13 months from an area 3 metres wide and 120 metres deep (10 ft by 400 ft).

The move to quartz mining led to Tarnagulla taking on a more settled appearance with brick and stone buildings replacing the earlier canvas structures. Local government was established in the area with the creation of the Borough of Tarnagulla in 1864. The borough was surveyed in 1864. By 1865, the town had reached its peak with a wide range of businesses operating including 4 hotels, 9 general stores, 3 surgeons, a share broker and watchmaker. In September of that year, the Tarnagulla court held its first sitting. Residents of the town included around 1,000 Chinese as well as groups of Greeks and Italians.

Later settlement focused on agriculture with sheep raising and wheat growing established in the area. A sawmill was established at nearby Bulla-bul Creek in 1863, and the railway from Dunolly reached Tarnagulla in 1888. New technology such as the use of cyanide allowed rework of some of the tailings of earlier mines. In 1906 the Poseidon nugget, weighing 26.6 kilograms (860 ozt) was found at Tarnagulla. The nugget was named after the racehorse Poseidon, winner of the 1906 Melbourne Cup. The nugget is one of the 30 largest gold discoveries in history.

The development of agriculture continued with the establishment of a flour mill in 1873. The mill was operational until 1917 and in 1920 the mill was relocated to Mildura. Gas streetlighting was established in Tarnagulla in 1869 and operated until the arrival of electricity in the town in 1950.

Tarnagulla Magistrates' Court closed on 8 June 1979. The abandoned mining village of Llanelly is located 4 km to the north-east.

In 2000 the towns' disused but "magnificent" Wesleyan Methodist church was gutted by fire after ceasing to be a place of worship in the mid-1970s.

== Today ==
Today the major industries in Tarnagulla include agriculture, fruit growing and flax oil production.

Golfers play at the course of the Tarnagulla and District Golf Club on Gladstone Street.

Tarnagulla is near the box-ironbark forests of the Waanyarra Nature Conservation Reserve, the Waanyarra-Dunolly State Forest and the Tarnagulla State Forest.
