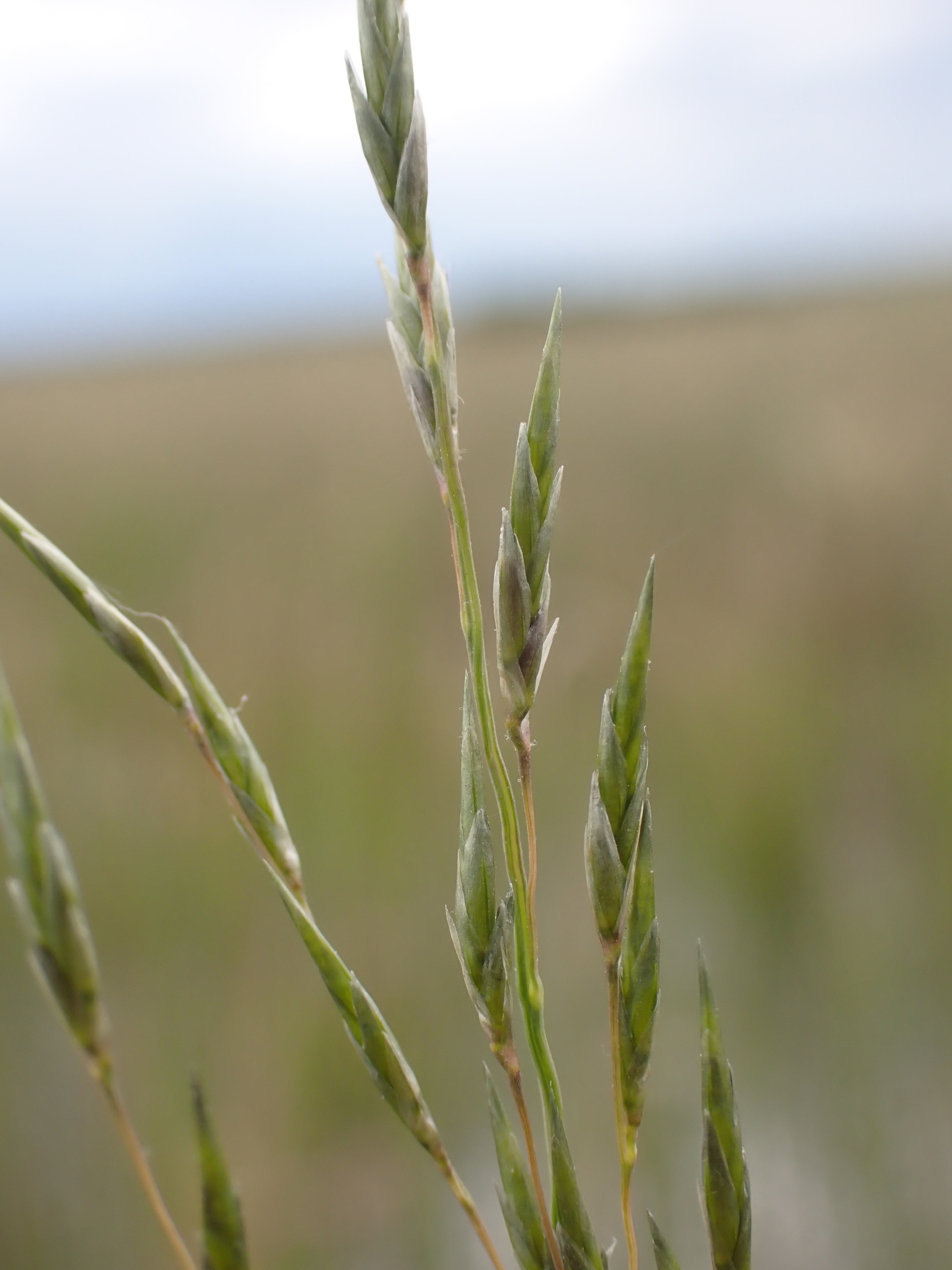

Scientific classification
- Kingdom: Plantae
- Clade: Tracheophytes
- Clade: Angiosperms
- Clade: Monocots
- Clade: Commelinids
- Order: Poales
- Family: Poaceae
- Subfamily: Chloridoideae
- Genus: Eragrostis
- Species: E. infecunda

Binomial name
- Eragrostis infecunda J.M.Black, 1931

= Eragrostis infecunda =

Species of plant

Eragrostis infecunda, commonly known as southern canegrass, is a species of grass, in the subfamily Chloridoideae of the family Poaceae, that is endemic to Australia. It has erected, wiry culms growing to 70 cm in height It is typically found on cracking clay or alluvial sandy loam soils, on floodplains, watercourses and depressions subject to periodic inundation, as well as the margins of marshes and on levees.
