= St Arnaud, Victoria =

St Arnaud
- Town
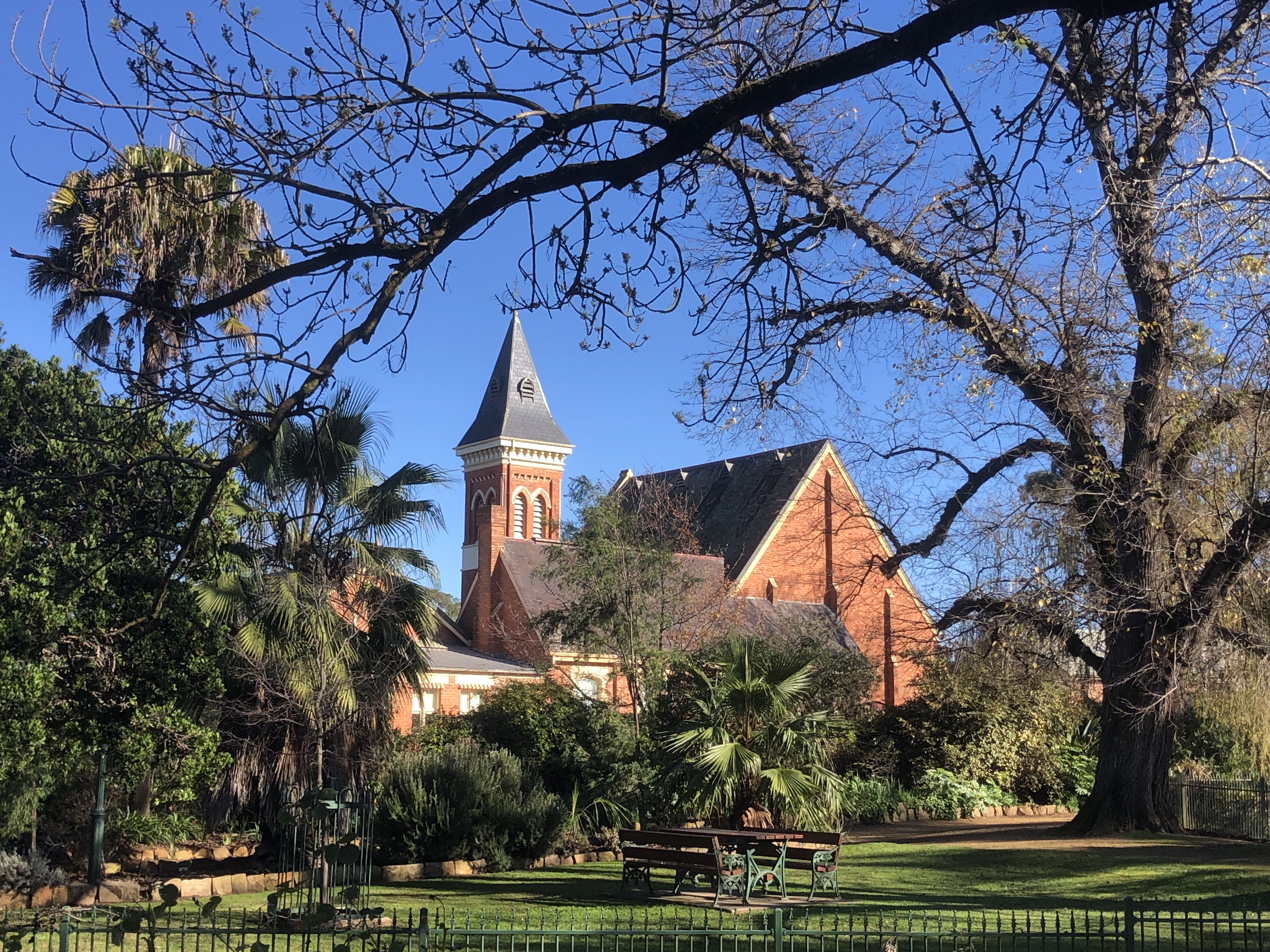
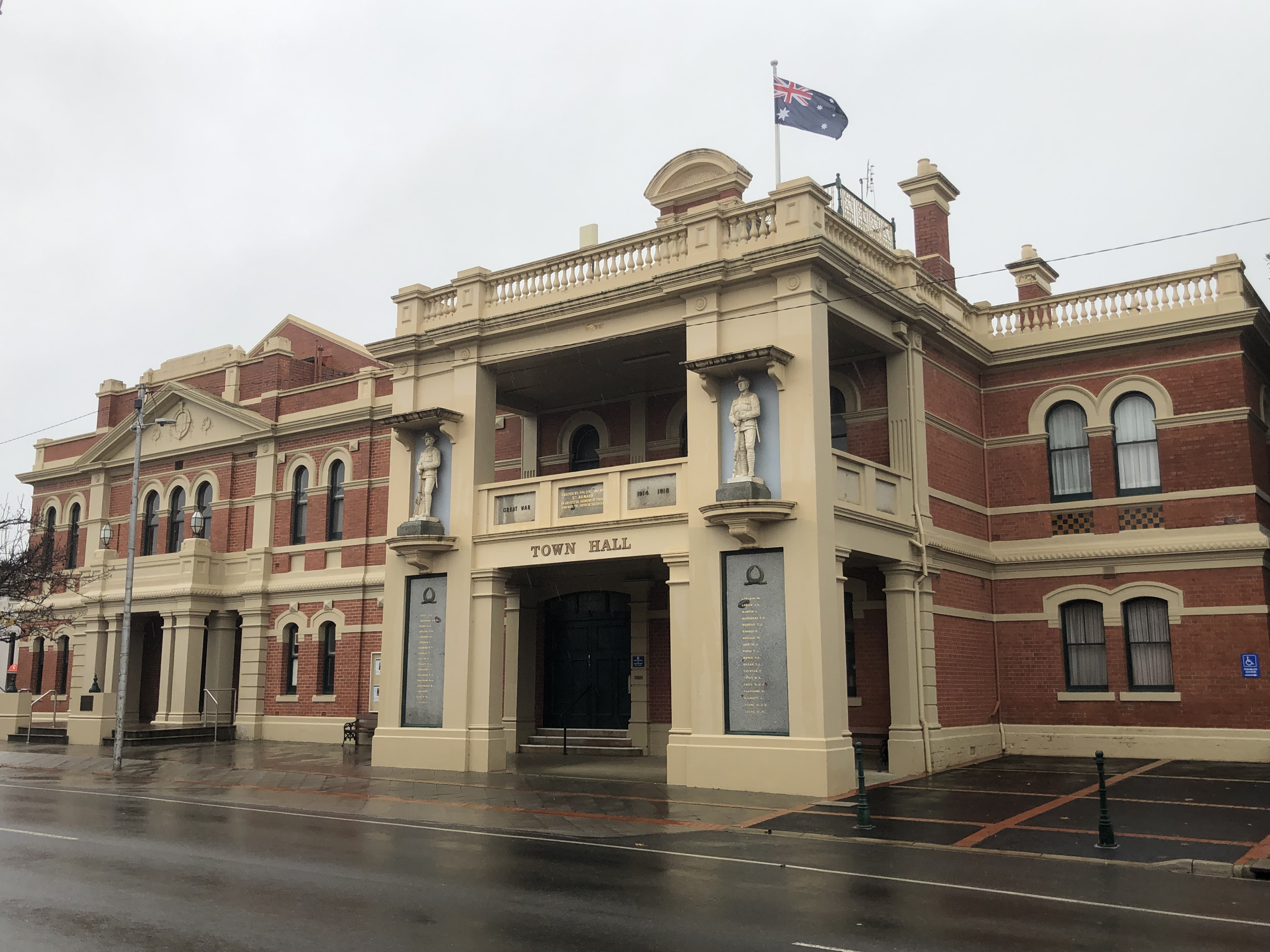
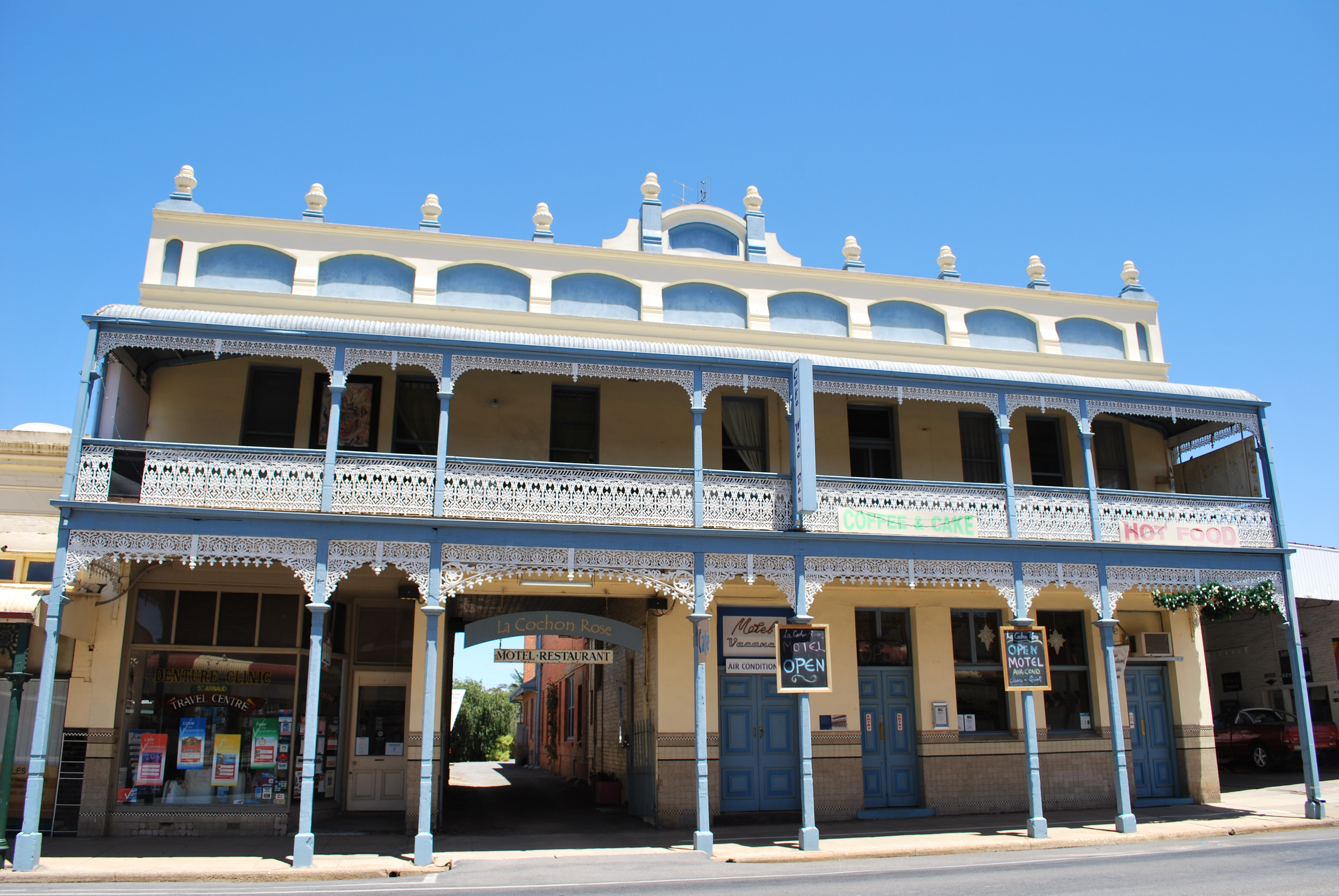
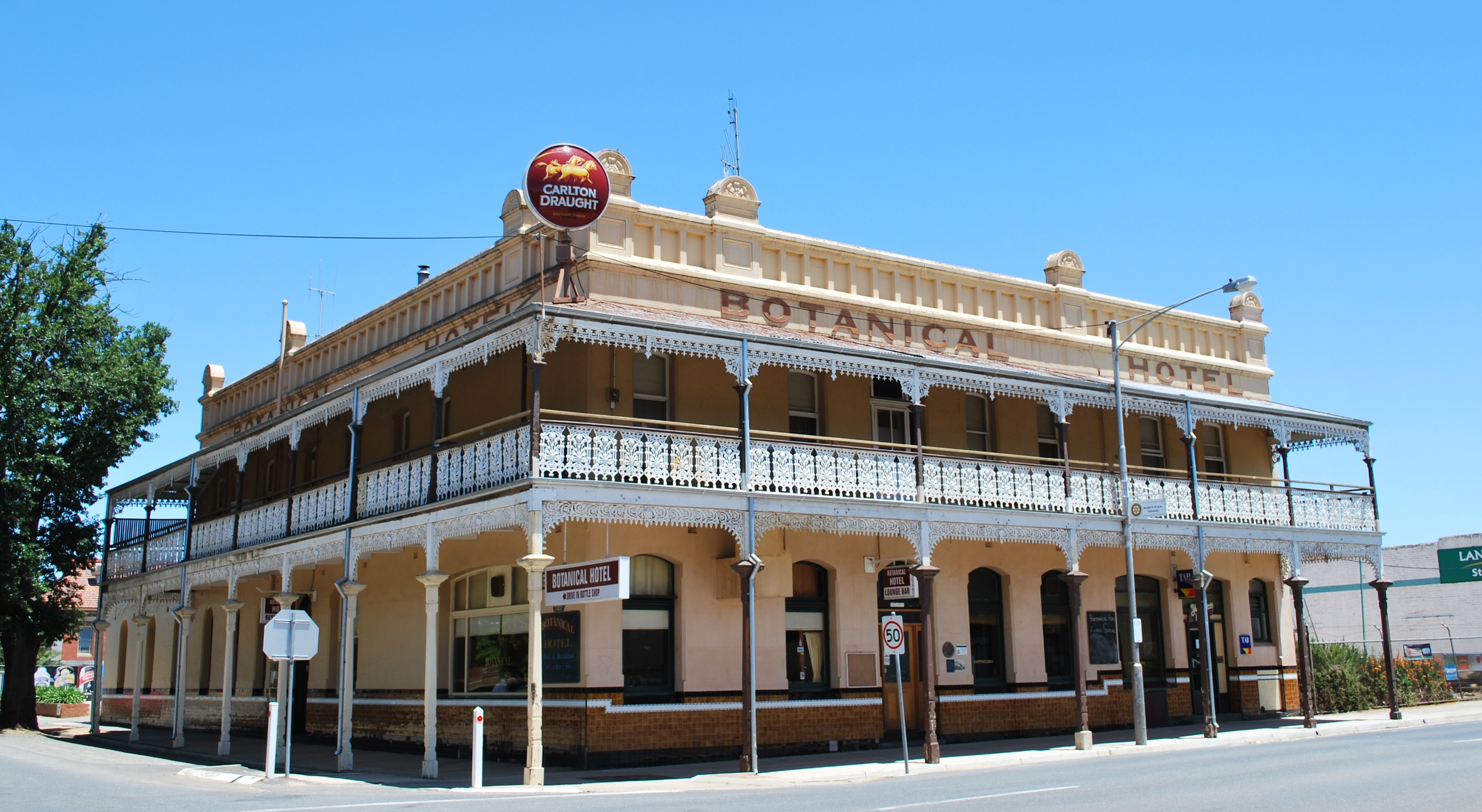
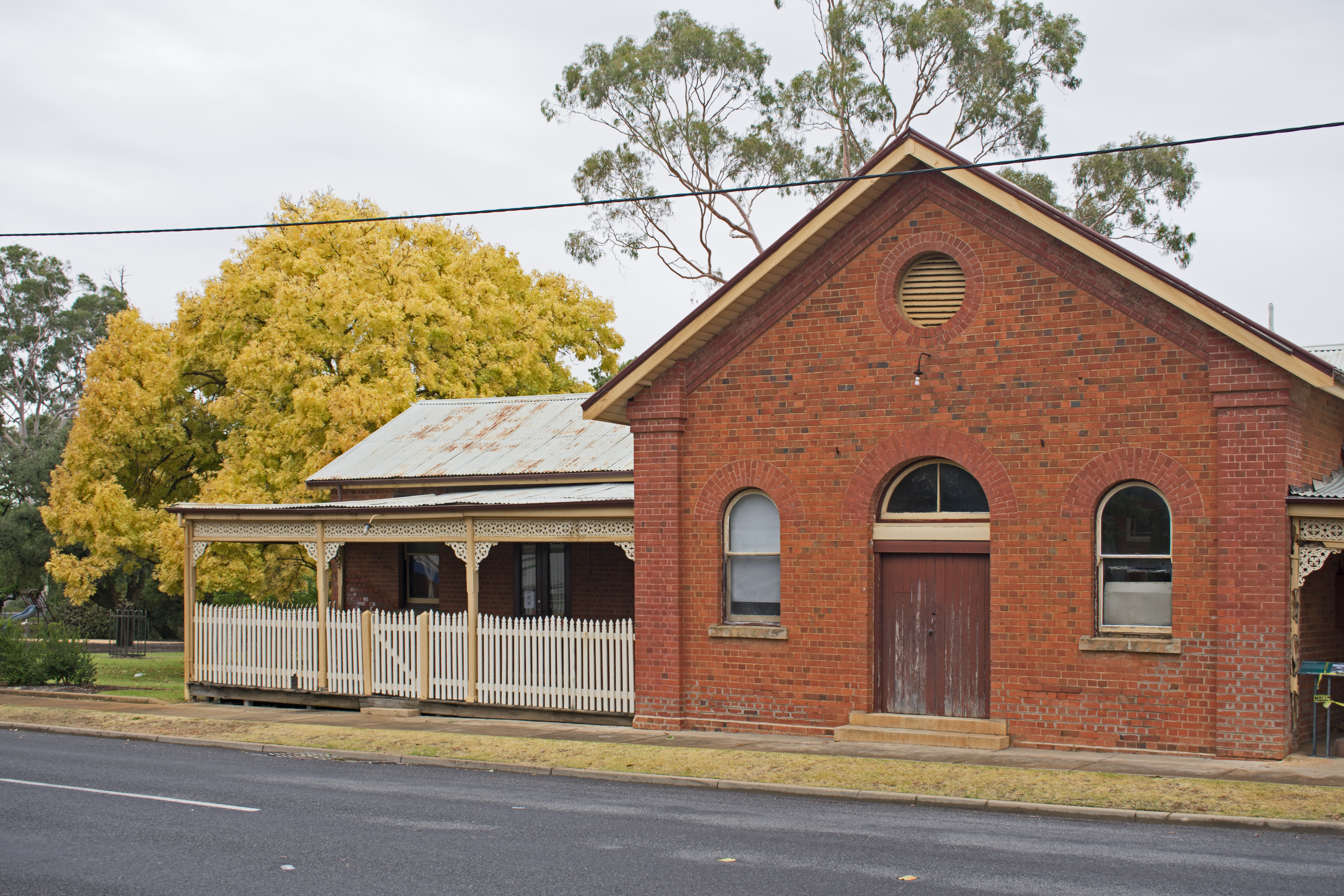
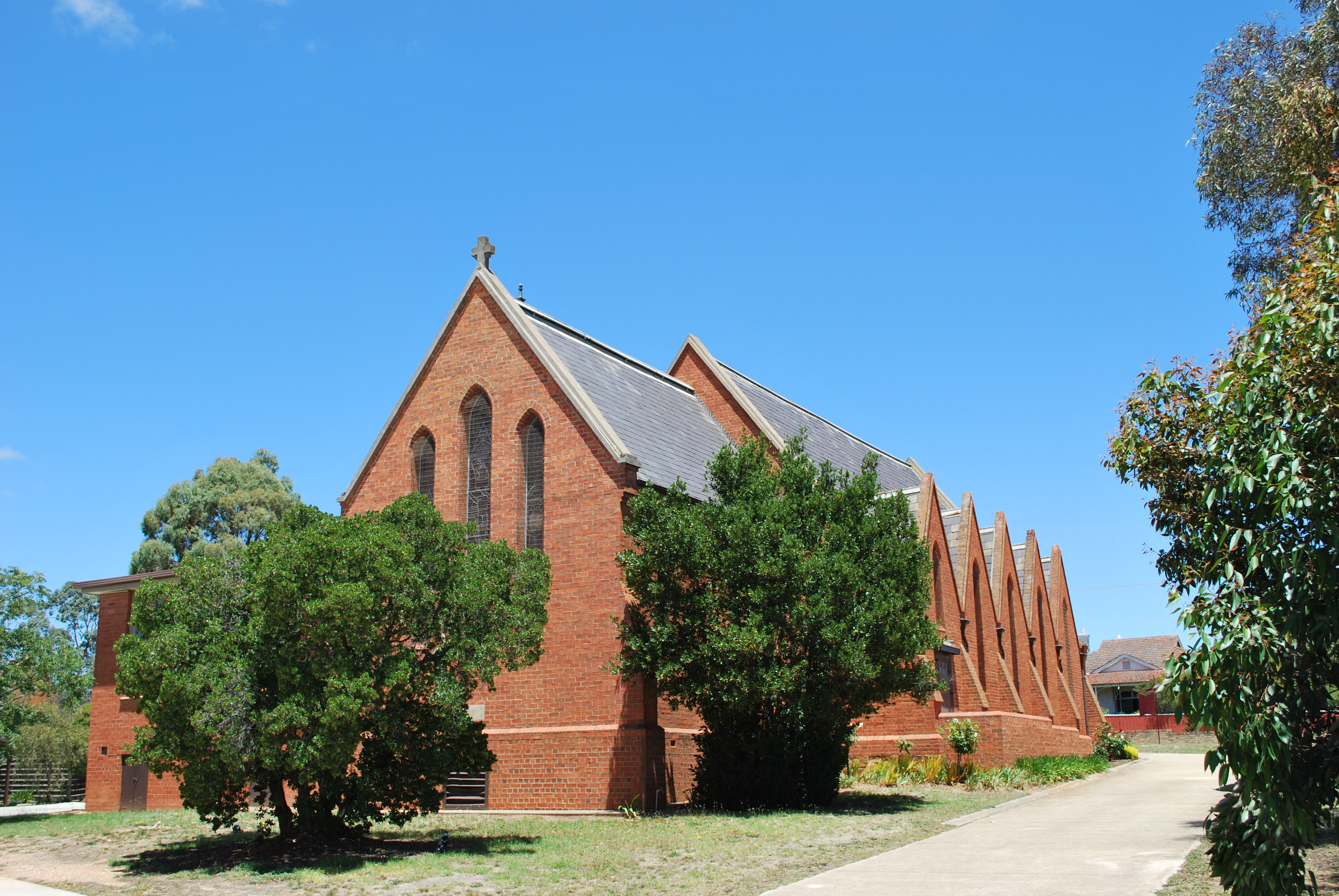
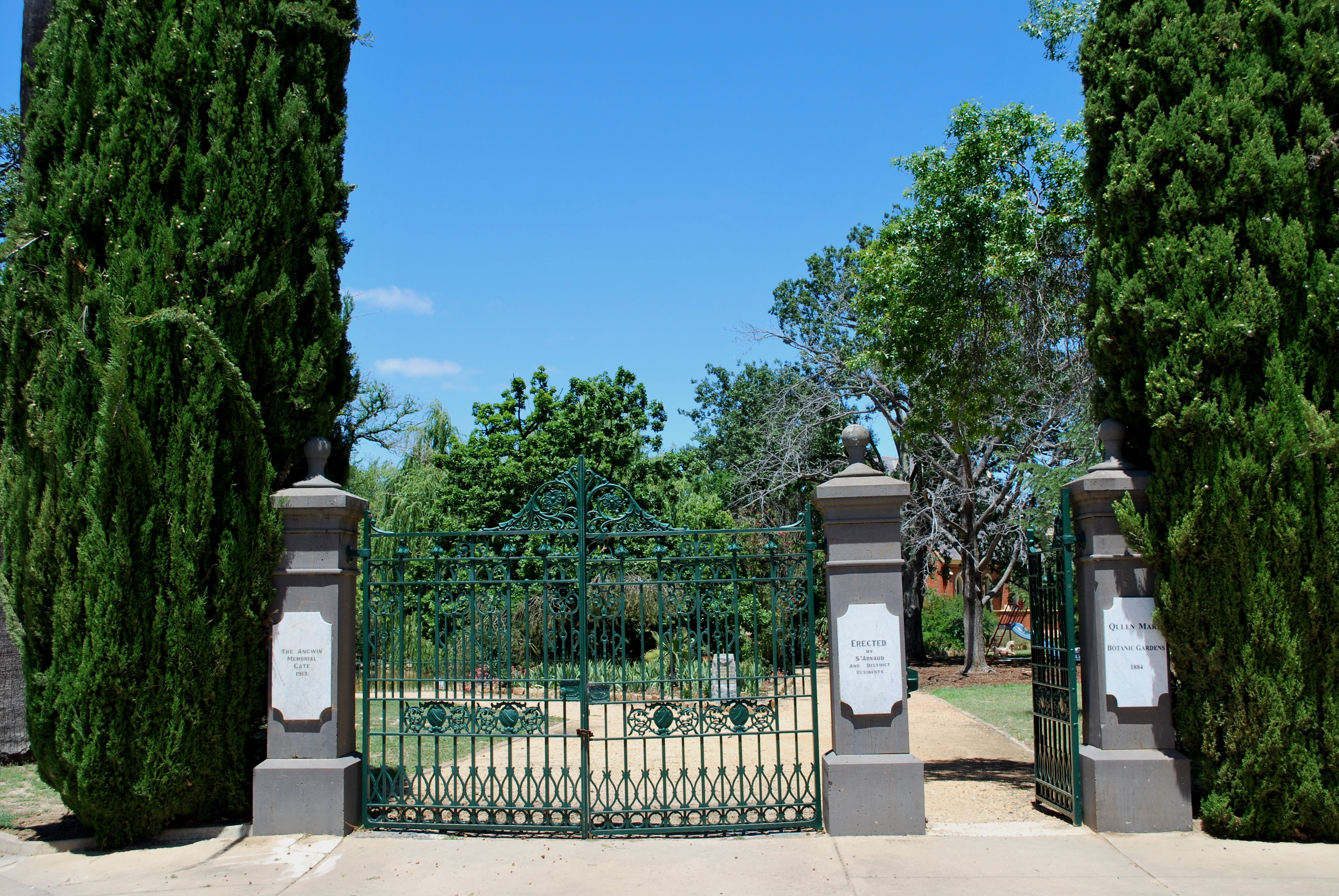
- St Arnaud Uniting Church, viewed from the Queen Mary Gardens, 2026 Town Hall The former Victoria Inn (La Cochon Rose Motel) Botanical Hotel The former Mechanics Institute Christ Church Old Cathedral Queen Mary Gardens

- Coordinates: 36°36′52″S 143°15′0″E
- Country: Australia
- State: Victoria
- LGA: Shire of Northern Grampians
- Location: 244 km (152 mi) from Melbourne; 132 km (82 mi) from Ballarat; 108 km (67 mi) from Horsham

Government
  - State electorate: Ripon
  - Federal division: Mallee
- Elevation: 240 m (790 ft)

Population
  - Total: 2,126 (UCL 2021)
- Postcode: 3478
- Mean max temp: 20.5 °C (68.9 °F)
- Mean min temp: 8.0 °C (46.4 °F)
- Annual rainfall: 546.0 mm (21.50 in)

St Arnaud /səntˈɑːnəd/ is a town in the Wimmera region of Victoria, Australia, 244 kilometres north west of the capital Melbourne. It is in the Shire of Northern Grampians local government area. At the 2021 census, St Arnaud had a population of 3,453.

It is named after French marshal Jacques Leroy de Saint Arnaud, commander-in-chief of the army of the East. It is one of quite a number of towns, streets etc. named after people and places of the Crimean War.

== History ==
St Arnaud is a former gold mining town, situated on the main route between Ballarat and Mildura. The town was settled in the mid-1850s, the post office opening on 1 February 1856.

The former Anglican Diocese of St. Arnaud (1926–76) was based in St. Arnaud. Its cathedral is now known as Christ Church Old Cathedral, on the corner of Queens Ave. and Raglan St.

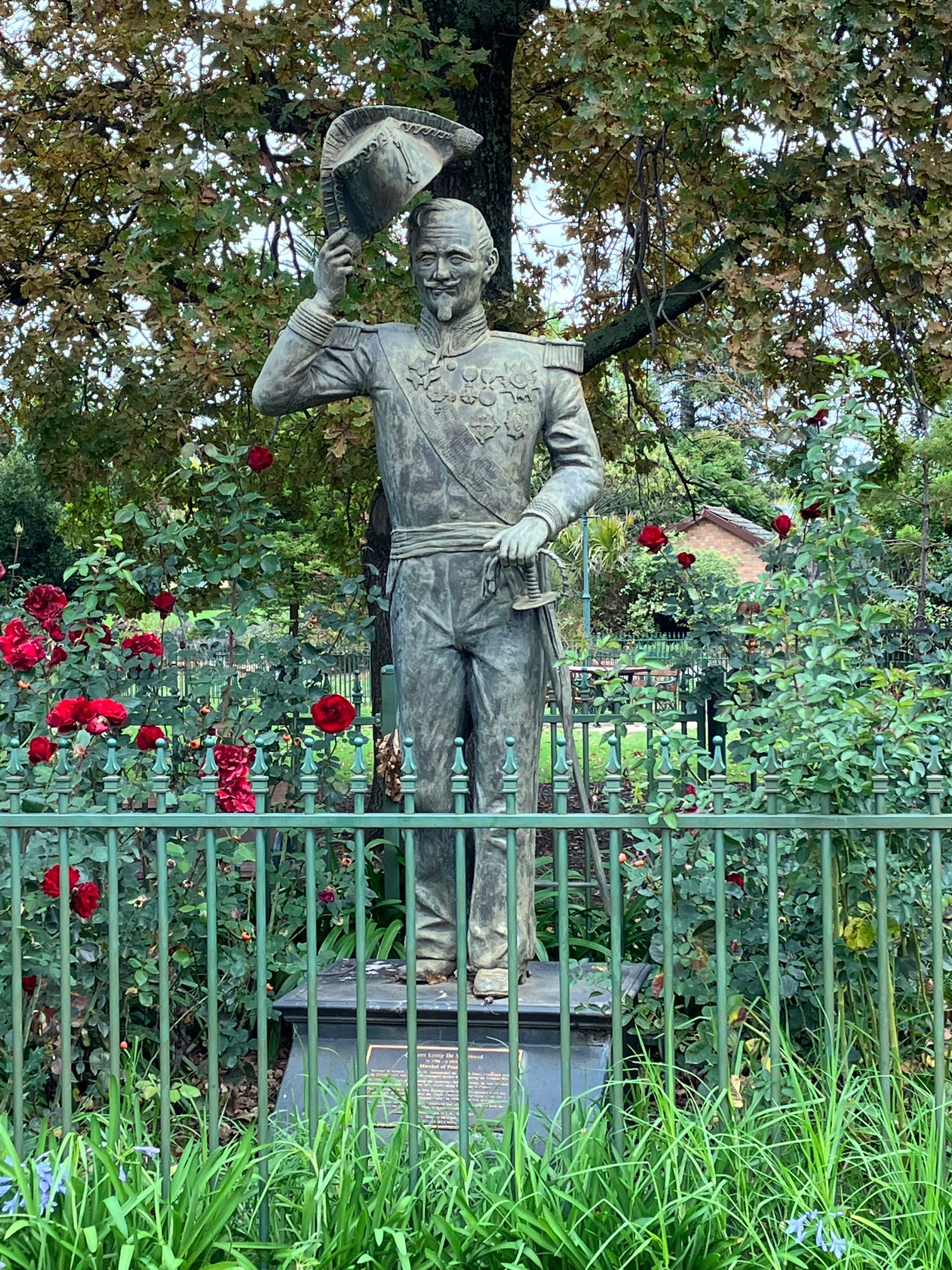
Statue of Marshal Leroy de Saint-Arnaud in the town's botanic gardens

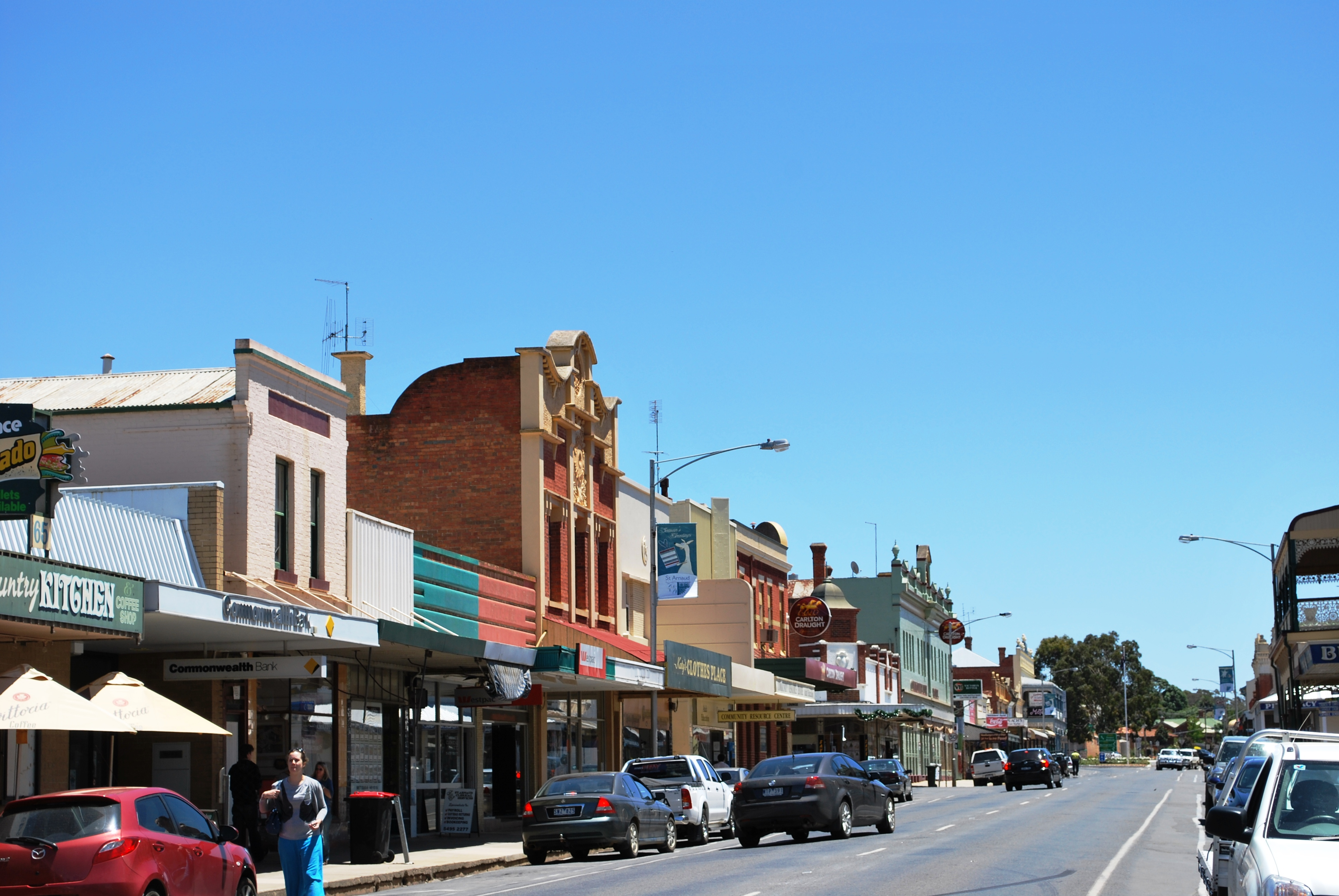
The Sunraysia Highway at St Arnaud in 2009

== Traditional ownership ==
The formally recognised traditional owners for the area in which St Arnaud sits are the Dja Dja Wurrung people who are represented by the Dja Dja Wurrung Clans Aboriginal Corporation.

== Demographics ==
As of the 2021 census, 2,318 people resided in St Arnaud. The median age of persons in St Arnaud was 52 years. Children aged 0–14 years made up 13.8% of the population. People over the age of 65 years made up 32.0% of the population There were slightly more females than males with 51.9% of the population female and 48.1% male. The average household size is 2 people per household. The average number of children per family for families with children is 1.8.

85.2% of people in St Arnaud were born in Australia. Of all persons living in St Arnaud, 2.3% (54 persons) were Aboriginal and/or Torres Strait Islander people. This is higher than for the state of Victoria (1.0%) and lower than the national average (3.2%). The most common ancestries in St Arnaud were English 44.6%, Australian 43.4%, Scottish 12.7%, Irish 12.5% and German 3.9%.

== Climate ==
St Arnaud has a warm temperate climate with Mediterranean characteristics. Summers are usually very warm and dry but thunderstorms can occur. Maximums around 32 °C–40 °C are expected with minimums around 15 °C. Winters are quite frosty most nights but daytime temperatures seem to climb to about 9 °C–14 °C with varied weather.

Climate data for St Arnaud, elevation 240 m (790 ft)
Month	Jan	Feb	Mar	Apr	May	Jun	Jul	Aug	Sep	Oct	Nov	Dec	Year
Record high °C (°F)	44.3 (111.7)	42.9 (109.2)	39.3 (102.7)	32.8 (91.0)	27.0 (80.6)	22.8 (73.0)	22.2 (72.0)	26.1 (79.0)	31.7 (89.1)	35.6 (96.1)	39.9 (103.8)	42.2 (108.0)	44.3 (111.7)
Mean daily maximum °C (°F)	29.4 (84.9)	29.1 (84.4)	25.8 (78.4)	20.7 (69.3)	16.1 (61.0)	13.0 (55.4)	12.3 (54.1)	13.9 (57.0)	16.9 (62.4)	20.3 (68.5)	24.3 (75.7)	27.5 (81.5)	20.8 (69.4)
Mean daily minimum °C (°F)	13.5 (56.3)	13.8 (56.8)	11.7 (53.1)	8.6 (47.5)	6.1 (43.0)	4.2 (39.6)	3.4 (38.1)	4.2 (39.6)	5.7 (42.3)	7.6 (45.7)	9.8 (49.6)	12.1 (53.8)	8.4 (47.1)
Record low °C (°F)	5.6 (42.1)	4.4 (39.9)	−0.6 (30.9)	0.0 (32.0)	−1.6 (29.1)	−3.7 (25.3)	−4.0 (24.8)	−2.4 (27.7)	−4.8 (23.4)	−0.4 (31.3)	1.2 (34.2)	3.3 (37.9)	−4.8 (23.4)
Average rainfall mm (inches)	28.8 (1.13)	26.3 (1.04)	27.0 (1.06)	36.5 (1.44)	51.4 (2.02)	56.6 (2.23)	54.8 (2.16)	55.3 (2.18)	48.4 (1.91)	47.5 (1.87)	36.3 (1.43)	30.8 (1.21)	500.0 (19.69)
Average rainy days (≥ 1.0 mm)	2.8	2.6	3.1	4.4	6.9	8.2	9.1	9.0	7.6	6.7	4.8	4.0	69.2
Source: Australian Bureau of Meteorology

== Present ==
The town features many well-preserved historic buildings which line the main thoroughfare of Napier Street, including a generous collection of pubs. A number of attractive gardens exist in town, including Pioneer Park (believed to be Australia's only remaining public park designed by Edna Walling), the Queen Mary Botanic Gardens, the Market Square gardens adjacent to the council offices and Lord Nelson Park which offers sporting facilities as well as attractions such as the old Lord Nelson Mine and views from Wilsons Hill.

The heritage listed 1878 St Arnaud Railway Station received a $1M upgrade in September 2019, to provide a permanent public gallery and a hub for arts, a marketspace for local artists and producers, artists' library and lounge and a community space for lectures and workshops.

A short drive south of St Arnaud towards Avoca is the St Arnaud Range National Park, featuring steep and forested terrain, camp sites and the Teddington Reservoir.

== Governance ==
St Arnaud is in the Shire of Northern Grampians. Formerly it had its own local government area, the Town of St Arnaud which was headquartered at the former St Arnaud Town Hall, however this was amalgamated into a new shire in 1993. St Arnaud today is a secondary service base for the Shire of Northern Grampians, while the headquarters are in Stawell.

== Culture ==
=== Events ===
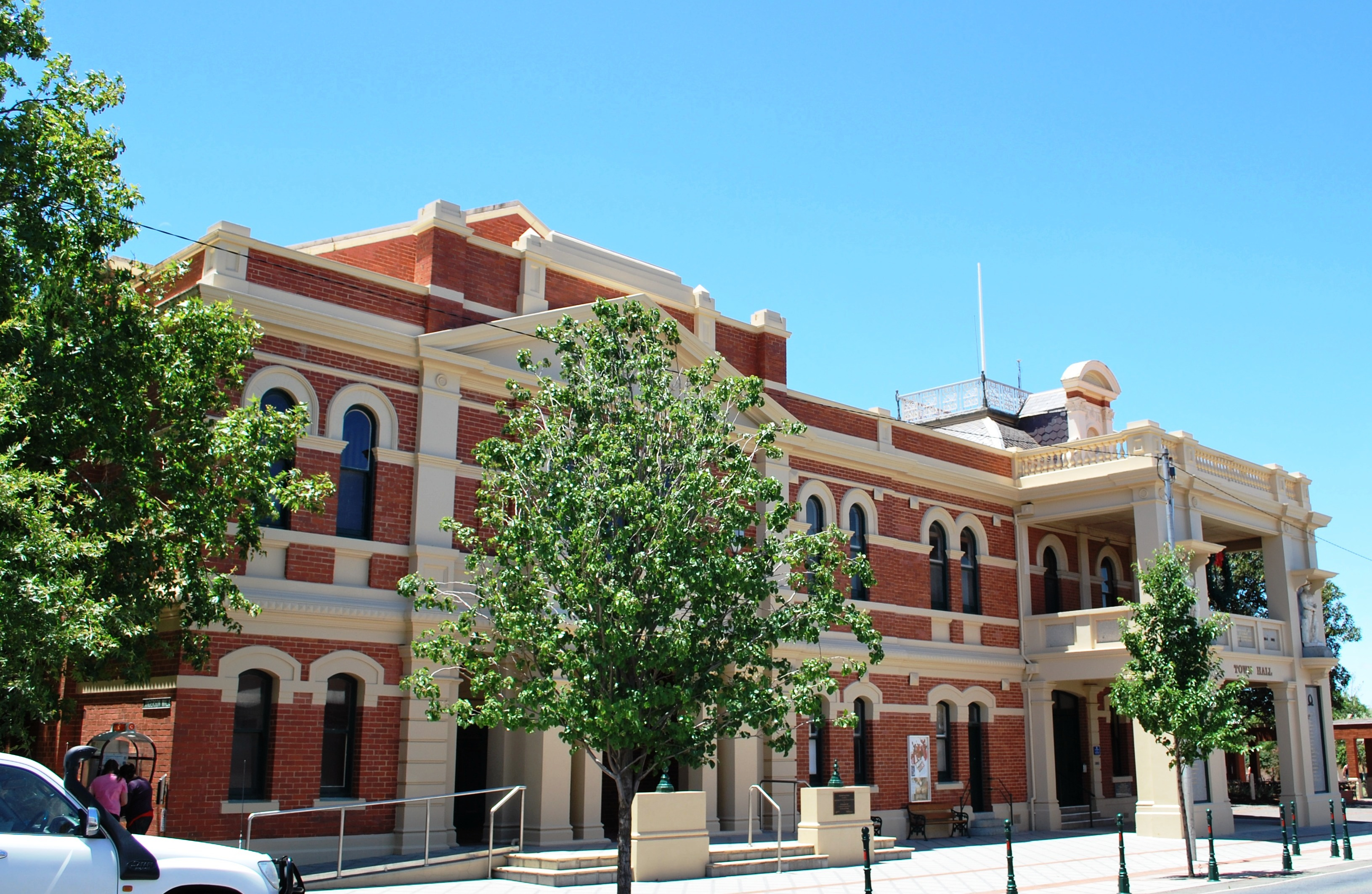
St Arnaud Town Hall

The town began an annual festival in 1996, which is held in November every year and includes events such as music concerts, market day, Gopher Grand Prix and numerous exhibitions and displays.

The former town hall functions as a community and performing arts space.

The St Arnaud Raillery Gallery, located at the refurbished St Arnaud Railway Station in Queens Avenue, has regular revolving exhibitions in various mediums. An arts, crafts and producers' marketspace promotes locally produced items.

=== Sport ===
St Arnaud has an Australian rules football team competing in the North Central Football League.

The St Arnaud Hockey Club, with five teams, competes in the North Central Hockey Association. Playing its home games on the grass of Lord Nelson Park, the club has had success on and off the field, with numerous players chosen to play in representative teams.

The St Arnaud Netball Club competes in the North Central Football League against other surrounding towns.

A horse racing club, the Wimmera Racing Club, schedules two race meetings a year at St Arnaud, including the St Arnaud Cup meeting in October.

Affiliated with the Australian Clay Target Association, the St Arnaud Gun Club hosts down-the-line shoots each month (except January). With three layouts, the gun club provides for traditional down-the-line, continental and ball trap events.

Golfers play at the St Arnaud Golf Club course.

St Arnaud fields two teams which play in the North Central Tennis Association.

== Transport ==
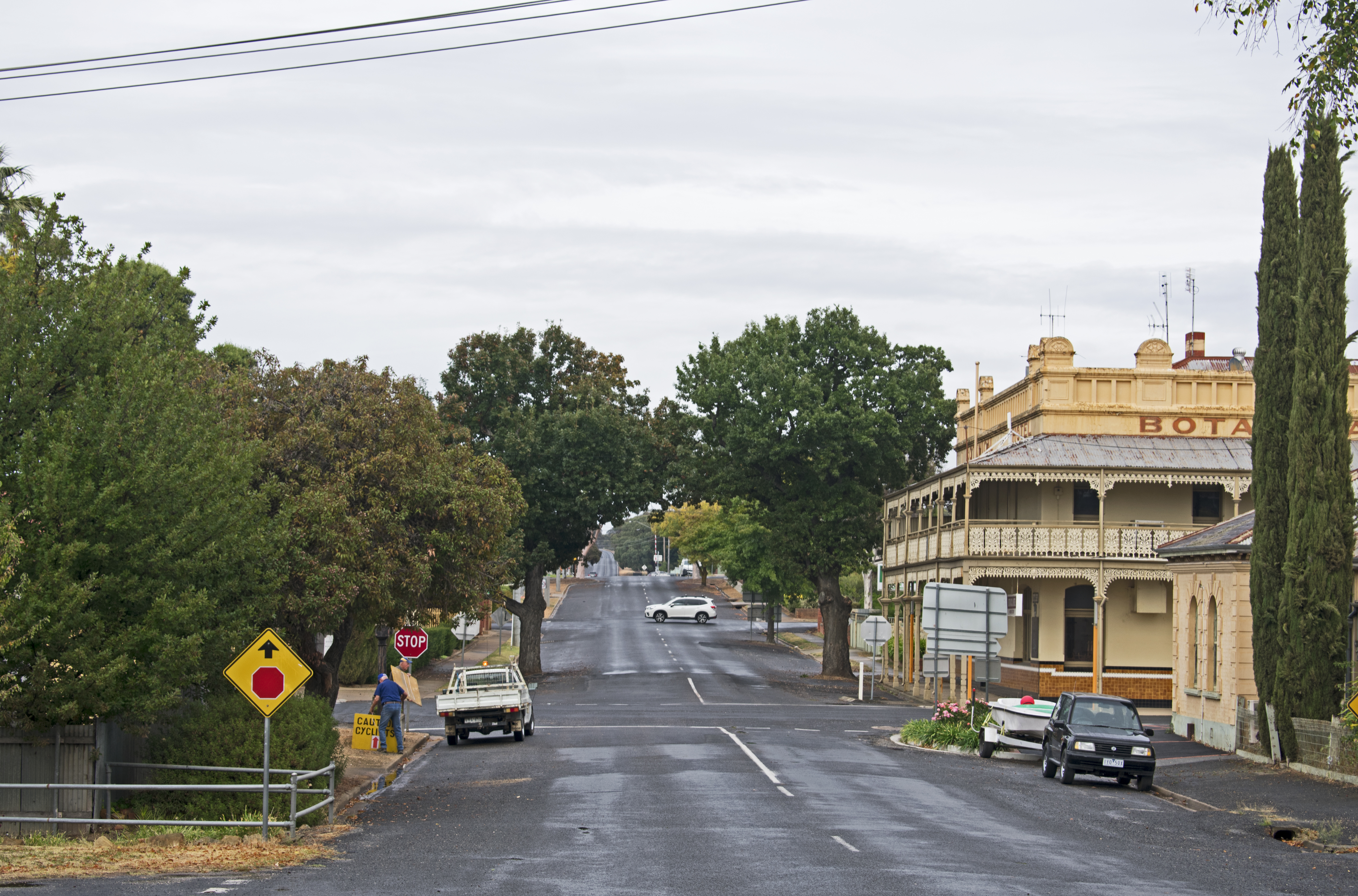
The junction of B220 (across) and B240 (ahead) in St Arnaud

St Arnaud is located at the junction of the Sunraysia (B220) and Wimmera Highways (B240). The B220 heads north to Donald and south to Avoca, while the Wimmera connects St Arnaud to Horsham in the west and Bendigo in the east.

Coach services also connect St Arnaud to major centres including the V/Line service to Mildura and Melbourne via Ballarat.

Train services for passengers ceased with the closure of the Mildura railway line in 1993, however St Arnaud railway station is still an important freight stop on the line.

St Arnaud Aerodrome 6.8 km west of the town centre provides for general aviation.

== Notable residents ==
- John Ogburn, modern artist, born in St Arnaud
- Patrick Alfred Jennings, first Catholic Premier of New South Wales, shopkeeper and gold mine owner in St Arnaud
- Pharez Phillips, St Arnaud town councillor, shopkeeper and farmer, who won the first federal election for the seat of Wimmera
- Gerald Ridsdale, former Catholic priest convicted of child sexual abuse and indecent assault charges against 71 children
- Brudenell White, Chief of the General Staff of the Australian Army, born in St Arnaud
- Maurie Wood, North Melbourne footballer.

== Government agencies in the town ==
- Victoria Police
- Northern Grampians Shire Council
- Country Fire Authority
- Victoria State Emergency Service
- Centrelink

== See also ==
- St Arnaud Mercury
- Lake Batyo Catyo
