= Shire of Wimmera =

Coordinates: 36°35′S 142°07′E

- Local government area
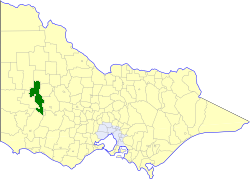
- Location in Victoria
- The Shire of Wimmera as at its dissolution in 1995
- Country: Australia
- State: Victoria
- Region: Wimmera
- Established: 1862
- Council seat: Horsham

Area
  - Total: 2,611 km^{2} (1,008 sq mi)

Population
  - Total: 2,920 (1992)
  - Density: 1.1183/km^{2} (2.897/sq mi)
- County: Borung
LGAs around Shire of Wimmera
Dimboola	Warracknabeal	Dunmunkle
Arapiles	Shire of Wimmera	Stawell
Dundas	Dundas	Ararat

The Shire of Wimmera was a local government area in the Wimmera region of western Victoria, Australia. The municipality covered an area of 2,611 square kilometres (1,008.1 sq mi), and existed from 1862 until 1995. Although its shire offices were located in Horsham, Horsham itself was governed by a separate council after it seceded in 1882.

== History ==
The Wimmera road district was incorporated on 3 March 1862, and this district became a shire on 4 March 1864. It was originally a very large district, including a significant portion of Walpeup, plus Arapiles, Dimboola, Dunmunkle, Kaniva, Kowree and Lowan, centred on the town of Horsham. By 1900, all of these areas had severed and separately incorporated, and Wimmera's boundaries remained largely unchanged for over 90 years.

On 20 January 1995, the Shire of Wimmera was abolished, and along with the City of Horsham and parts of the Shires of Arapiles and Kowree, was merged into the newly created Rural City of Horsham. The section within the Grampians National Park was transferred to the newly created Shire of Northern Grampians, whilst the Kewell West and Wallup districts were transferred to the newly created Shire of Yarriambiack.

== Wards ==
Wimmera was divided into four ridings, each of which elected three councillors:

- North Riding
- South Riding
- East Riding
- West Riding

== Towns and localities ==
- Ailsa
- Blackheath
- Byrneville
- Cannum
- Dadswells Bridge
- Dahlen
- Dooen
- Jung
- Kalkee
- Kewell
- Longerenong
- McKenzie Creek
- Murra Warra
- Pimpinio
- Quantong
- Riverside
- St Helens Plains
- Vectis
- Wail

== Population ==
Year	Population
1954	3,569
1958	3,790*
1961	3,535
1966	3,481
1971	3,046
1976	3,060
1981	2,960*
1986	2,850*
1991	2,930

* Estimates in 1958, 1983 and 1988 Victorian Year Books.
