= List of places on the Victorian Heritage Register in the Rural City of Horsham =

This is a list of places on the Victorian Heritage Register in the Rural City of Horsham in Victoria, Australia. The Victorian Heritage Register is maintained by the Heritage Council of Victoria.

The Victorian Heritage Register, as of 2020, lists the following seven state-registered places within the Rural City of Horsham:

Place name	Place #	Location	Suburb or Town	Co-ordinates	Built	State registered	Photo
Wimmera Stock Bazaar	H1985	71-81 Hamilton St	Horsham	36.718100°S 142.197530°E	1936	20 June 2002	
Fulham Homestead	H0476	29 Walcott Rd	Kanagulk	37.136450°S 141.861170°E	1848	10 September 1980	
Horsham Theatre	H2225	37-41 Pynsent St	Horsham	36.715460°S 142.200730°E	1926	3 December 2009	
Horsham Town Hall	H2279	78 Wilson St	Horsham	36.716070°S 142.198560°E	1938-39	8 June 2011	
Mount Talbot Homestead	H0468	1 Mt Talbot Rd	Toolondo	37.029950°S 141.919700°E	c. 1862	18 June 1980	
Pavilion Classroom	H2051	38 Old Noradjuha Rd	Natimuk	36.741220°S 141.950800°E	1914	8 April 2004	
St Michael and St John Catholic Church	H2301	9 McLachlan St	Horsham	36.713450°S 142.202700°E	1987	14 June 2012	
