= List of places of worship in the Rural City of Horsham =

This is a list of places of worship in the Rural City of Horsham, a local government area in the state of Victoria, Australia. The list includes active and former churches and other religious buildings representing a variety of Christian denominations and other faiths.

St John the Divine Anglican Church, Horsham

== Heritage listing status ==
Style	Status
Yes	Listed on the Victorian Heritage Register
–	Not listed

== Current places of worship ==
Current places of worship
Name	Image	Location	Denomination/ Affiliation	Heritage listing	Notes	Refs
Ss Michael and John Catholic Church		Horsham; 36.713527°S 142.202824°E	Catholic	Yes		
Horsham Church of Christ (new)		Horsham; 36.731808°S 142.202123°E	Church of Christ	–		
Horsham Seventh-day Adventist Church		Horsham; 36.716915°S 142.193711°E	Seventh-day Adventist	–		
Horsham Presbyterian Church		Horsham; 36.704615°S 142.201210°E	Presbyterian	–		
Holy Trinity Lutheran Church		Horsham; 36.711417°S 142.204605°E	Lutheran	–		
St Andrew's Uniting Church		Horsham; 36.715010°S 142.202747°E	Uniting (formerly Presbyterian)	–		
St John the Divine Anglican Church		Horsham; 36.711371°S 142.199721°E	Anglican	–		
Natimuk Uniting Church		Natimuk; 36.739711°S 141.947419°E	Uniting (formerly Presbyterian)	–		
St Paul's Lutheran Church		Natimuk; 36.742865°S 141.937792°E	Lutheran	–		
St Aidan's Anglican Church		Natimuk; 36.738861°S 141.947058°E	Anglican	–		
Pimpinio Uniting Church		Pimpinio; 36.584019°S 142.117037°E	Uniting (formerly Methodist (Wesleyan))	–		
Zion Lutheran Church (Vectis Lutheran Church)		Quantong; 36.727474°S 142.062699°E	Lutheran (formerly Methodist (Bible Christian))	Yes		
Horsham Mosque		Horsham; 36.725231°S 142.204539°E	Islam	–		

== Former places of worship ==
Former places of worship
Name	Image	Location	Denomination/ Affiliation	Heritage listing	Notes	Refs
Horsham Wesleyan Methodist Church		Horsham; 36.714481°S 142.201962°E	Methodist (Wesleyan)	–		
Horsham Church of Christ (old site)		Horsham; 36.711510°S 142.201959°E	Church of Christ	Non-existent		
St John's Catholic Church		Natimuk; 36.739380°S 141.948103°E	Catholic	–		
Jung Methodist Church		Jung; 36.607114°S 142.357976°E	Methodist	–		

== See also ==
- List of places of worship in the City of Ballarat
- List of places of worship in the City of Greater Bendigo
- List of places of worship in the City of Greater Geelong
