= Shire of Lowan =

Coordinates: 36°20′S 141°39′E

- Local government area
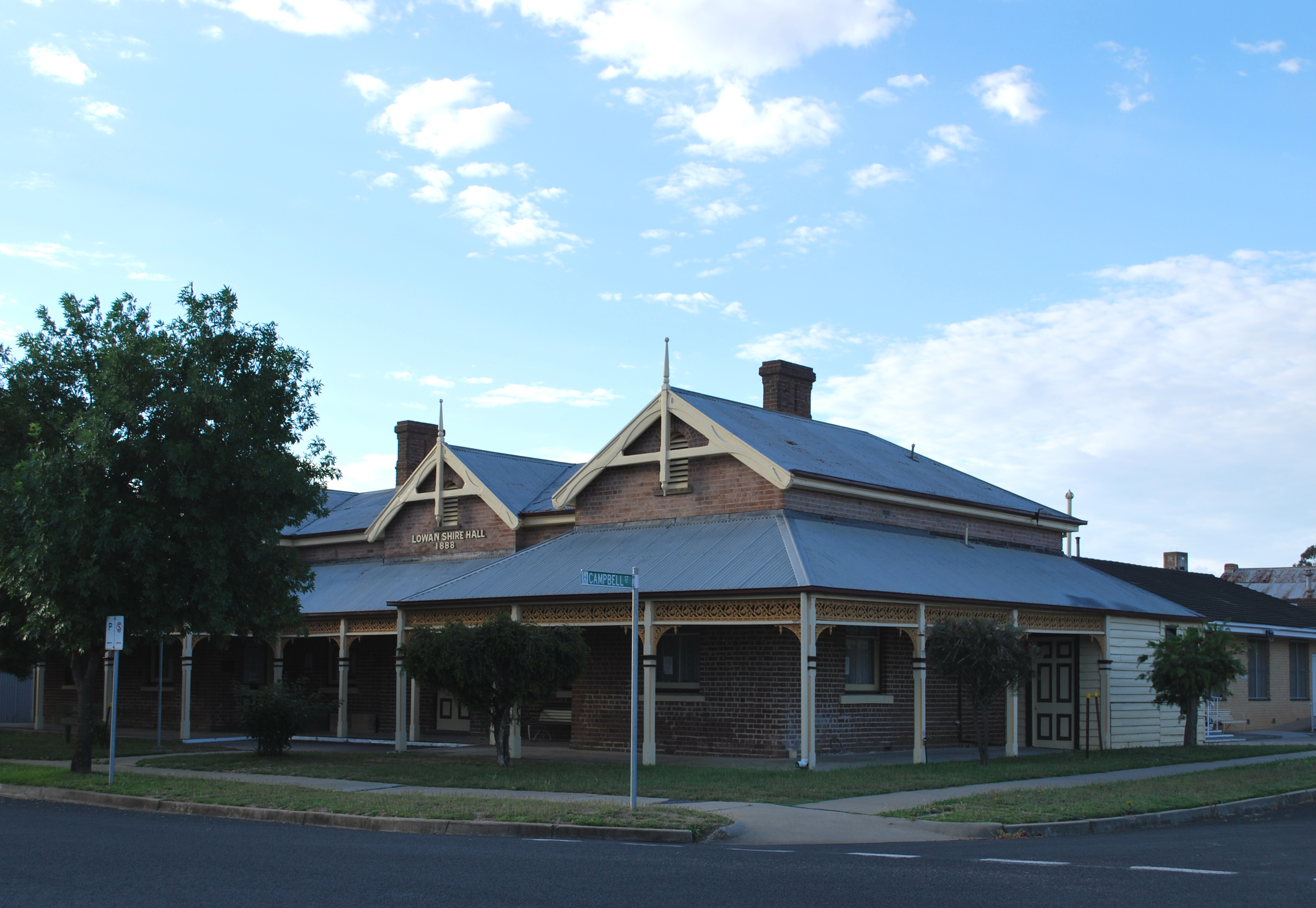
- The Shire Hall in Nhill, built in 1888

- The Shire of Lowan as at its dissolution in 1995
- Country: Australia
- State: Victoria
- Region: Wimmera
- Established: 1875
- Council seat: Nhill

Area
  - Total: 2,861 km^{2} (1,105 sq mi)

Population
  - Total(s): 2,940 (1992)
  - Density: 1.0276/km^{2} (2.662/sq mi)
- County: Lowan, Weeah
LGAs around Shire of Lowan
Walpeup	Walpeup	Dimboola
Kaniva	Shire of Lowan	Dimboola
Kowree	Kowree	Arapiles

The Shire of Lowan was a local government area in the Wimmera region of western Victoria, Australia. The shire covered an area of 2,861 square kilometres (1,104.6 sq mi), and existed from 1875 until 1995.

== History ==
Lowan was originally part of the Shire of Wimmera, which was incorporated in 1862. On 31 December 1875, Lowan became a shire in its own right. Several parts of the shire split away in its first 20 years;

- the Shire of Dimboola severed from Lowan and incorporated on 2 April 1885;
- the West Riding was severed to form the Shire of Lawloit (Kaniva) on 29 May 1891;
- the South Riding was severed to form the Shire of Kowree on 29 May 1894.

Like many western shires, it lost a remote section to its north, when the Shire of Walpeup was created on 1 November 1911.

On 20 January 1995, the Shire of Lowan was abolished, and along with the Shire of Dimboola, was merged into the newly created Shire of Hindmarsh.

== Wards ==
The Shire of Lowan was divided into four ridings on 31 May 1901, each of which elected three councillors:

- East Riding
- West Riding
- South Riding
- Southwest Riding

== Towns and localities ==
- Baker
- Balrootan North
- Boyeo
- Broughton
- Kinimakatka
- Netherby
- Nhill*
- Propodollah
- Tarraginnie
- Waggon Flat
- Winiam
- Yannac

* Council seat.

== Population ==
Year	Population
1954	3,999
1958	4,130*
1961	3,872
1966	3,822
1971	3,489
1976	3,510
1981	3,350*
1986	3,220*
1991	2,990

* Estimates in 1958, 1983 and 1988 Victorian Year Books.
