= City of Horsham =

City of Horsham Victoria
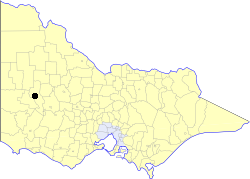
- Location in Victoria
- The City of Horsham as at its dissolution in 1994
- Population: 13,070 (1992)
  - Density: 560.7/km^{2} (1,452.2/sq mi)
- Established: 1882
- Area: 23.31 km^{2} (9.0 sq mi)
- Council seat: Horsham
- Region: Wimmera
- County: Borung

The City of Horsham was a local government area about 290 kilometres (180 mi) west-northwest of Melbourne, the state capital of Victoria, Australia. The municipality covered an area of 23.31 square kilometres (9.0 sq mi), and was established in 1882.

== History ==
Horsham was initially part of the Shire of Wimmera, and was first incorporated as a borough on 17 November 1882. It became a town on 16 November 1932, and was proclaimed a city on 25 May 1949.

On 20 January 1995, the City of Horsham was abolished, and along with parts of the Shires of Arapiles, Kowree and Wimmera, was merged into the newly created Rural City of Horsham.

=== Wards ===
The City of Horsham was not subdivided into wards, with its nine Councillors representing the entire area.

== Population ==
Year	Population
1954	7,767
1958	8,690*
1961	9,240
1966	10,557
1971	11,045
1976	11,647
1981	12,480
1986	12,810
1991	13,030

* Estimate in 1958 Victorian Year Book.
