= Shire of Mildura =

Coordinates: 34°19′S 142°00′E

- Local government area
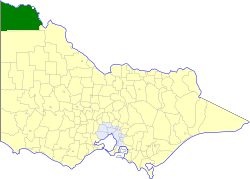
- Location in Victoria

- The Shire of Mildura as at its dissolution in 1995
- Country: Australia
- State: Victoria
- Region: Mallee
- Established: 1890
- Council seat: Mildura, then Irymple

Area
  - Total: 10,145 km^{2} (3,917 sq mi)

Population
  - Total: 21,230 (1992)
  - Density: 2.0927/km^{2} (5.4200/sq mi)
- County: Karkarooc, Millewa
LGAs around Shire of Mildura
Paringa (SA)	Wentworth (NSW)	Wentworth (NSW)
Loxton (SA)	Shire of Mildura	Wentworth (NSW)
Loxton (SA)	Walpeup	Swan Hill

The Shire of Mildura was a local government area located at the northwestern corner of Victoria, Australia, on the Murray River and the South Australian border. The shire covered an area of 10,145 square kilometres (3,917.0 sq mi), and existed from 1890 until 1995. From 1920 onwards, Mildura itself was managed by a separate entity, ultimately known as the City of Mildura.

== History ==
Mildura was part of the Swan Hill Road District, which initially covered most of northwestern Victoria. Swan Hill was incorporated on 8 July 1862, and became a shire on 14 August 1871. On 10 January 1890, the Shire of Mildura was incorporated, from part of its Lower Murray Riding.

A new shire, Walpeup, was formed in western Victoria on 1 October 1911, taking in some southern areas of Mildura and sections of five other shires. A small part of the shire, in and near Mildura, was severed on 18 May 1920, and incorporated as a borough, which became the City of Mildura on 21 March 1934. Parts of the Sandilong and Lake Ridings were annexed to the city on 1 October 1971.

On 20 January 1995, the Shire of Mildura was abolished, and along with the City of Mildura and the Shire of Walpeup, was merged into the newly created Rural City of Mildura.

== Wards ==
The Shire of Mildura was divided into three ridings, each of which elected three councillors:

- Koorlong Riding
- Lake Riding
- Sandilong Riding

== Towns and localities ==
- Birdwoodton
- Cabarita
- Cardross
- Carwarp
- Colignan
- Hattah-Kulkyne National Park
- Irymple*
- Karawinna
- Koorlong
- Lake Cullulleraine
- Merbein
- Merbein South
- Merbein West
- Murray-Sunset
- Meringur
- Nangiloc
- Red Cliffs
- Redgrove
- Sunnycliffs
- Werrimull

* Council seat.

== Population ==
Year	Population
1954	15,727
1958	16,370*
1961	16,340
1966	16,306
1971	15,706
1976	17,585
1981	18,868
1986	19,373
1991	20,489

* Estimate in the 1958 Victorian Year Book.
