= Shire of Kaniva =

Coordinates: 36°22′S 141°14′E

Shire of Kaniva Victoria
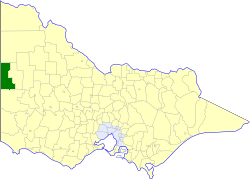
- Location in Victoria
- The Shire of Kaniva as at its dissolution in 1995
- Population: 1,680 (1992)
  - Density: 0.5451/km^{2} (1.412/sq mi)
- Established: 1891
- Area: 3,082.11 km^{2} (1,190.0 sq mi)
- Council seat: Kaniva
- Region: Wimmera
- County: Lowan, Weeah
LGAs around Shire of Kaniva:
Tatiara (SA)	Walpeup	Walpeup
Tatiara (SA)	Shire of Kaniva	Lowan
Naracoorte (SA)	Kowree	Kowree

The Shire of Kaniva was a local government area in the Wimmera region of western Victoria, Australia, near the South Australian town of Bordertown. The shire covered an area of 3,082.11 square kilometres (1,190.0 sq mi), and existed from 1891 until 1995.

== History ==
Kaniva was originally part of the Shire of Wimmera when it was incorporated in 1862, then became part of the Shire of Lowan when it split away from Wimmera. The Shire of Lawloit was established in its own right out of the West Riding of Lowan on 29 May 1891. It was renamed Kaniva on 22 May 1939.

On 20 January 1995, the Shire of Kaniva was abolished, and along with the Shire of Kowree and parts of the Shires of Arapiles and Glenelg, was merged into the newly created Shire of West Wimmera.

== Wards ==
The Shire of Kaniva was divided into three ridings, each of which elected three councillors:

- East Riding
- North Riding
- West Riding

== Towns and localities ==
- Dinyarrak
- Kaniva*
- Lawloit
- Leeor
- Lillimur
- Miram
- Sandsmere
- Serviceton
- Telopea Downs
- Yanipy
- Yarrock
- Yearinga

* Council seat.

== Population ==
Year	Population
1954	2,290
1958	2,490*
1961	2,408
1966	2,370
1971	2,104
1976	1,949
1981	1,930*
1986	1,750*
1991	1,720

* Estimates in 1958, 1983 and 1988 Victorian Year Books.
