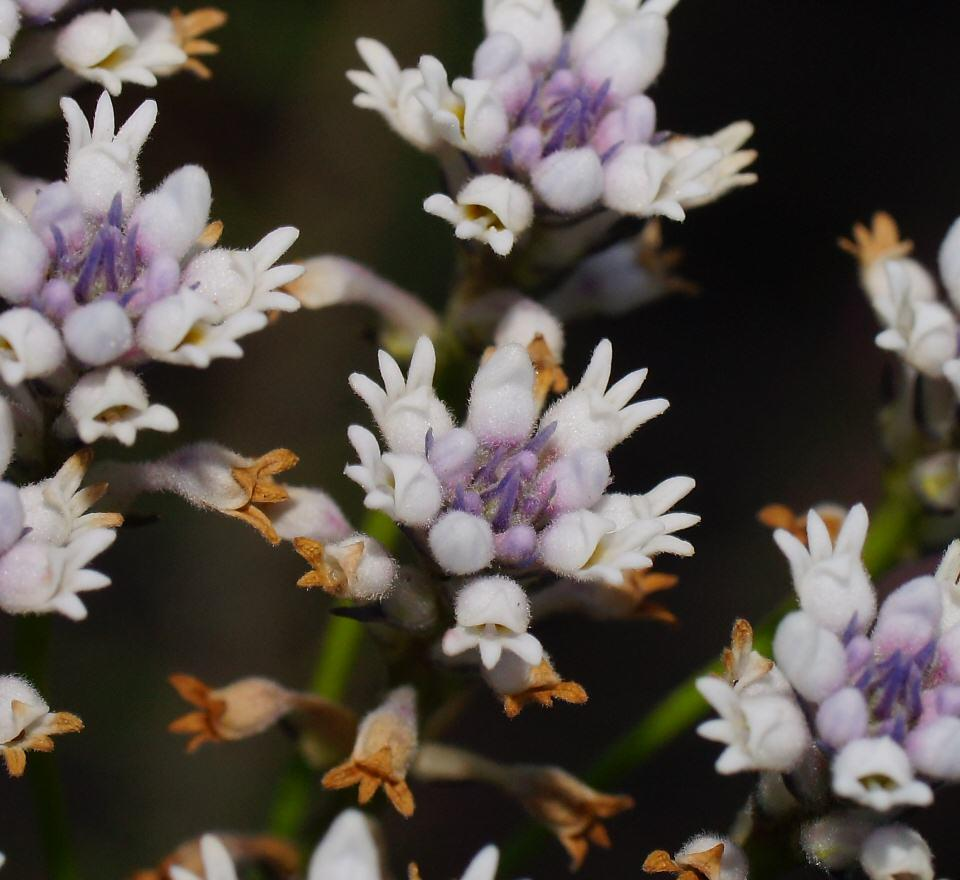

Scientific classification
- Kingdom: Plantae
- Clade: Embryophytes
- Clade: Tracheophytes
- Clade: Spermatophytes
- Clade: Angiosperms
- Clade: Eudicots
- Order: Proteales
- Family: Proteaceae
- Genus: Conospermum
- Species: C. patens

Binomial name
- Conospermum patens Schltdl.

= Conospermum patens =

Slender smokebush

Species of flowering plant

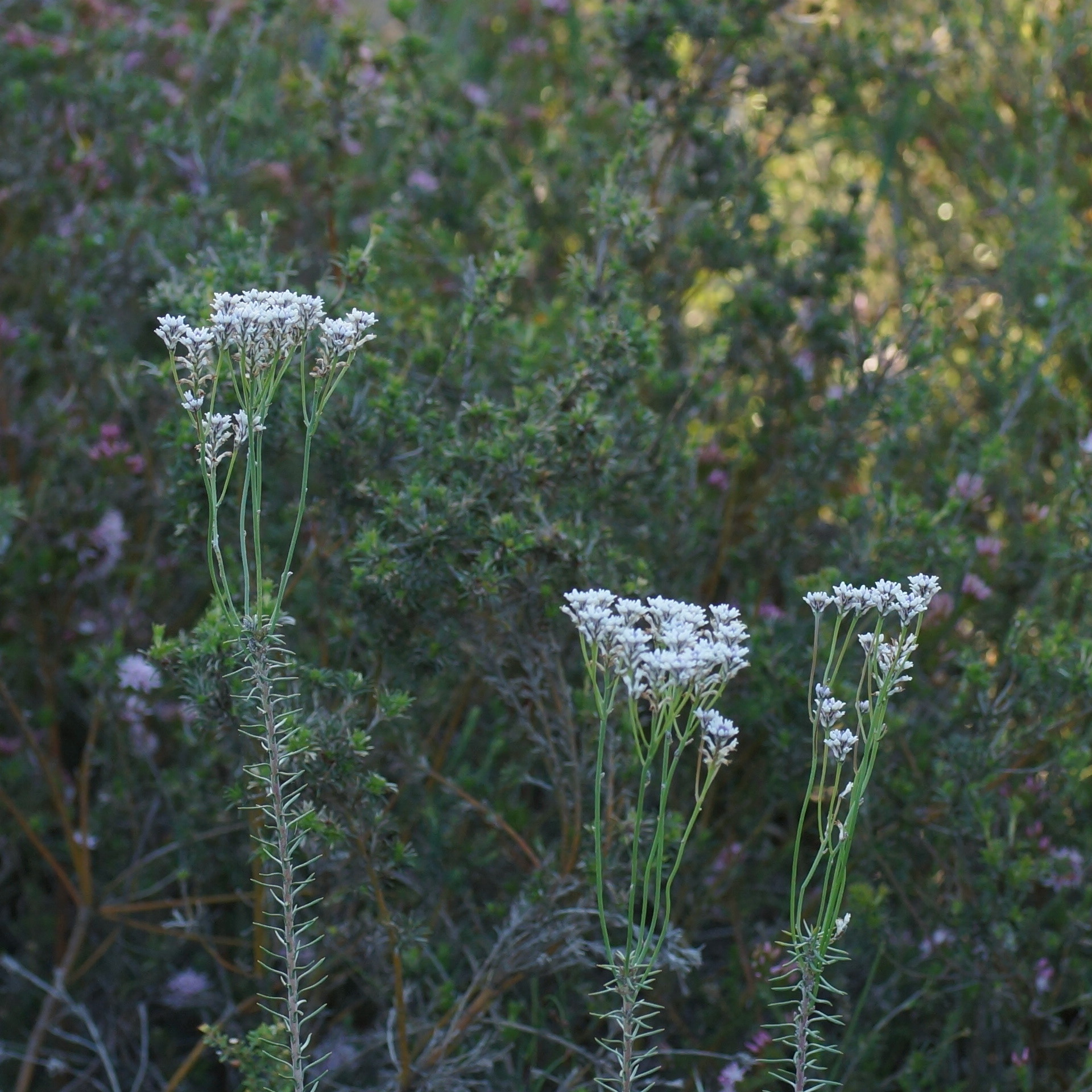
Habit near Dadswells Bridge

Conospermum patens, commonly known as slender smokebush, is a species of flowering plant of the family Proteaceae and is endemic to south-eastern continental Australia. It is an erect shrub with crowded linear or spatula-shaped leaves, panicles of densely hairy white, bluish-grey or purplish flowers and hairy, yellowish-brown nuts.

== Description ==
Conospermum patens is an erect shrub that typically grows to a height of up to about 1 m (3 ft 3 in) and has its branches covered with soft, white hairs. Its leaves are crowded, widely spreading, linear or spatula-shaped, 1.5–46 mm (0.059–1.811 in) long and 0.7–2.7 mm (0.028–0.106 in) wide. The flowers are arranged in panicles mostly 10–40 mm (0.39–1.57 in) wide, on the ends of branches or in upper leaf axils, on a peduncle 40–200 mm (1.6–7.9 in) long. There are egg-shaped bracteoles 2–5 mm (0.079–0.197 in) long and 0.8–2.5 mm (0.031–0.098 in) wide. The perianth is white, bluish-grey or purplish, forming a tube 2.2–4.5 mm (0.087–0.177 in) long. The upper lip is egg-shaped, 2.5–3.5 mm (0.098–0.138 in) long and 1.5–2.3 mm (0.059–0.091 in) wide, the lower lip joined for 1–2 mm (0.039–0.079 in) with oblong lobes 1–2 mm (0.039–0.079 in) long and 03–0.9 mm (0.118–0.035 in) wide. Flowering mostly occurs from September to December, and the fruit is a hairy, yellowish-brown nut 1.8–2.3 mm (0.071–0.091 in) long and 2.0–2.6 mm (0.079–0.102 in) wide.

== Taxonomy ==
Conospermum patens was first formally described in 1847 by Diederich von Schlechtendal in the journal Linnaea: Ein Journal für die Botanik in ihrem ganzen Umfange, oder Beiträge zur Pflanzenkunde, from a specimen collected in a pine forest near Gawler by Hans Hermann Behr. The specific epithet (patens) means 'spreading'.

== Distribution and habitat ==
Slender smokebush grows in the west of Victoria in the Grampians, Little and Big Deserts and near Casterton, and on the southern Eyre Peninsula and lower south-east of South Australia, where it grows in heath, heathy woodland and shrubland.
