= Grove (nature) =

Small group of trees

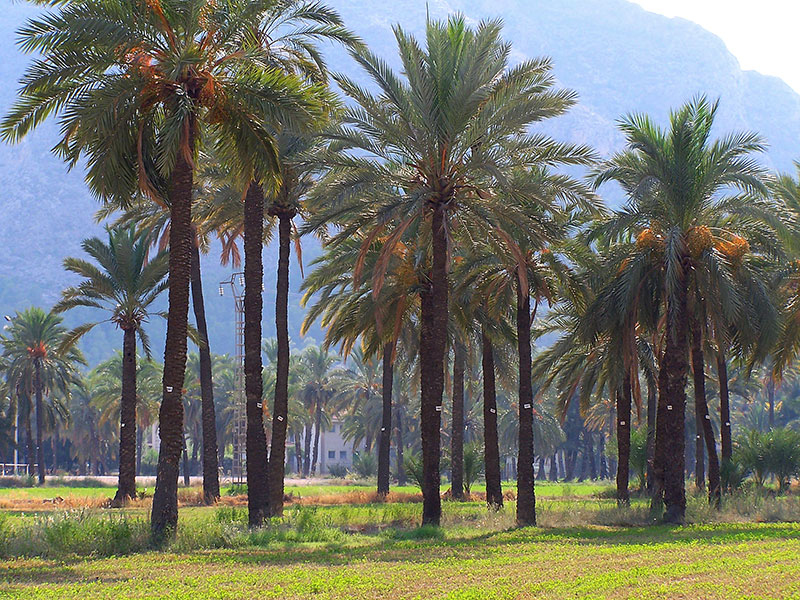
Palm grove at Orihuela, Spain.

A grove is a small group of trees with minimal or no undergrowth, or a small orchard planted for the cultivation of fruits or nuts. Naturally occurring groves are typically small, perhaps a few acres at most, such as a sequoia grove. In contrast, orchards, which are normally intentional planting of trees, may be small or very large, like the apple orchards in Washington state, orange groves in Florida and olive groves in Australia.

A grove may be called an arbour or arbor, which is not to be confused with the garden structure pergola, which also sometimes goes under that name. Other words for groups of trees include woodland, woodlot, thicket, and stand. Groves often contain plant and animal species that have become extinct in adjacent areas, and they harbor great genetic diversity. Therefore, they have become biodiversity hotspots, as various species seek refuge in the areas due to progressive habitat destruction.

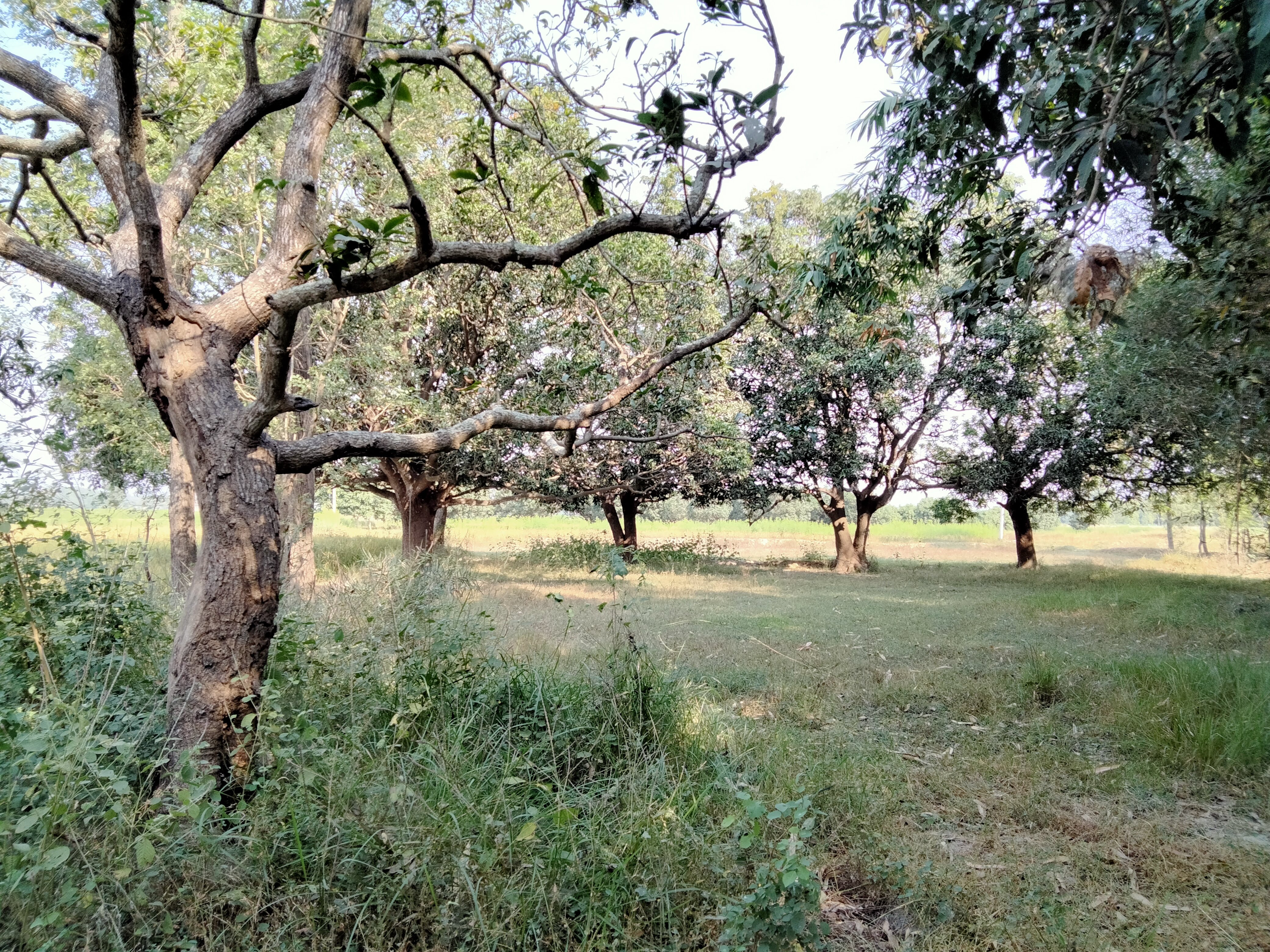
View of a mango groves known as Jageshwar Gachhi at Basuki Bihari, Madhubani.

== Name ==
The main meaning of grove is a group of trees that grow close together, generally without many bushes or other plants underneath. It is defined as "a smaller group of trees than a forest often without underwood and planted or growing naturally as if arranged by art; a wood of small extent; a planting of fruit or nut trees, an orchard".

It is an old word in the English language, with records of its use dating as far back as the late 9th century as Old English grāf, grāfa ('grove; copse') and subsequently Middle English grove, grave; these derive from Proto-West Germanic *graib, *graibō ('branch, group of branches, thicket'), from Proto-Germanic *graibaz, *graibô ('branch, fork'). It is related to Old English grǣf, grǣfe ('brushwood; thicket; copse'), Old English grǣfa ('thicket'), dialectal Norwegian greive ('ram with splayed horns'), dialectal Norwegian greivlar ('ramifications of an antler'), dialectal Norwegian grivla ('to branch, branch out'), Old Norse grein ('twig, branch, limb'), and cognate with modern English greave.

== Cultural significance ==
Historically, groves were considered sacred in pagan, pre-Christian Germanic and Celtic cultures. Helen F. Leslie-Jacobsen argues that "we can assume that sacred groves actually existed due to repeated mentions in historiographical and ethnographical accounts. e.g. Tacitus, Germania." Martin Luther (1483–1546) and later Friedrich Gottlieb Klopstock (1724–1803) were responsible for the development and expansion of the term "grove" to pertained to a "cultivated and protected forest in which a deity is worshipped" and to an agricultural land like a vineyard.

=== Australia ===
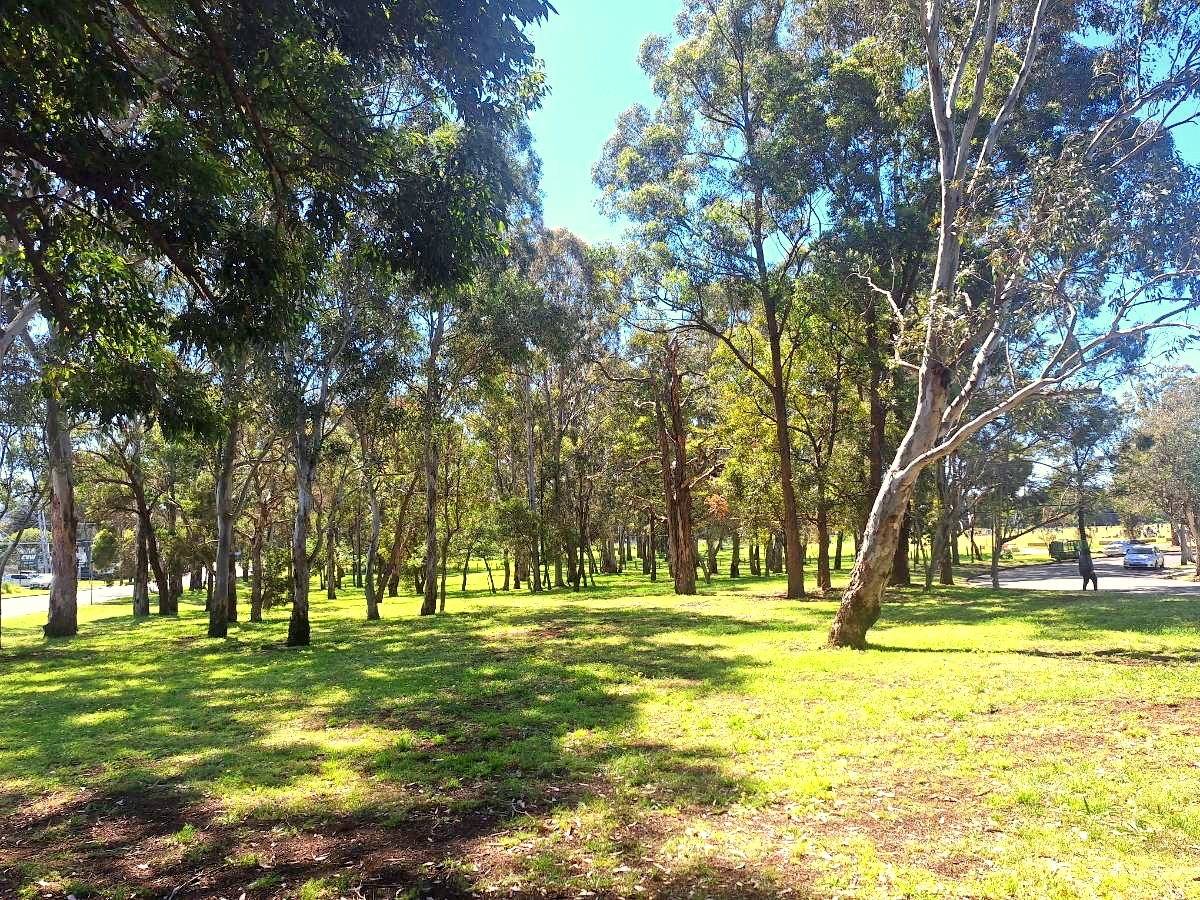
A naturally-occurring eucalyptus grove in Sydney, Australia

Australia has several olive grove sites, particularly in the southern temperate regions of the country. Such sites are found in the Hunter Valley in New South Wales, Yanchep National Park in Western Australia, Laharum in the Grampians region of Victoria (which are one of the oldest olive groves in Australia), Goornong in the City of Greater Bendigo, and in the Mediterranean region of Pooraka in South Australia, which has the most established groves in Australia. The Bridgeward Grove in Goornong offers the property for various events and visits, and the Arolyn Grove in Hunter Valley is the region's highlight.

The Fedra Olive Grove in Currawang, New South Wales won the prestigious 2020 Athena International Olive Oil Competition.

=== South Asia ===
In Buddhism, a grove symbolizes a peaceful forest space where transformative experiences may occur and in Hinduism a grove symbolizes a holy sanctuary for saints and a place of exploration for ancestral contact.

In India, sacred groves are forest fragments of varying sizes, which are communally protected, and which usually have a significant religious connotation for the protecting community, and many of the groves are looked upon as dwellings of Hindu deities Other forms of forest usage like honey collection and deadwood collection are sometimes allowed on a sustainable basis. Non-profit organizations work with local villagers to protect such groves. Traditionally, members of the community take turns to protect the grove. Around 14,000 sacred groves are reported across India, which act as reservoirs of rare fauna, amid rural and even urban settings.

=== Middle East ===
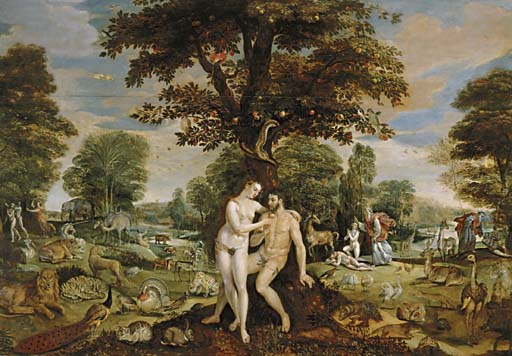
Garden of Eden

The Garden of Eden, as portrayed in the Book of Genesis, is viewed as a divine grove. In Gethsemane, the olive grove where Jesus prayed before his crucifixion, Christians believe the garden symbolizes divine interaction with nature, marking a pivotal moment in Christian salvation-history. Similarly, Abraham’s grove: "And Abraham planted a grove in Beersheba, and called there on the name of God" (Genesis 21:33) emphasizes the religious importance of groves as sites for worship and connection to God. Groves served as symbolic representations of deity as in 2 Kings 23:7 where the women weave hangings for the grove.

The worship of Asherah and the use of groves were common in the ancient Near East, particularly among the Canaanites, and were generally located near altars or elevated places. In ancient Assyria, Tiglath Pileser III had mulberry and date palm groves planted throughout his city walls. In Babylonia and ancient Mesopotamia in general, thick groves of tamarisk have been present along the Euphrates.

An oasis, which is a fertile area found in the arid regions of the Greater Middle East, is known for featuring palm groves.

=== Europe ===
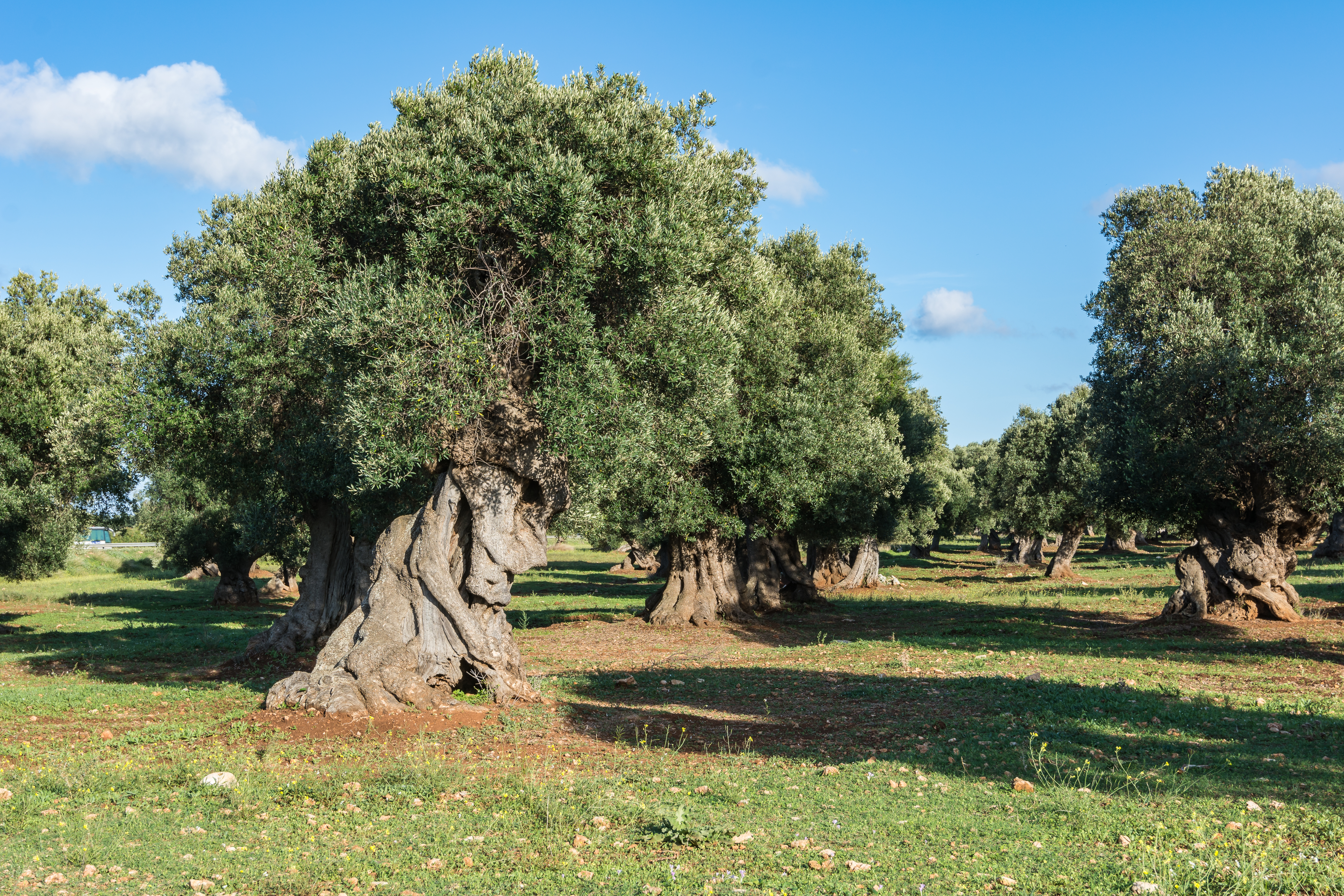
An olive tree grove that is a few centuries old, Salento, Italy

A famous sacred grove in mainland Greece was the oak grove at Dodona. Outside the walls of Athens, the site of the Platonic Academy was a sacred grove of olive trees, still recalled in the phrase "the groves of Academe". In central Italy, the town of Nemi recalls the Latin nemus Aricinum, or "grove of Ariccia", a small town a quarter of the way around the lake. In antiquity, the area had no town, but the grove was the site of one of the most famous of Roman cults and temples: that of Diana Nemorensis. The city of Massilia, a Greek colony, had a sacred grove so close by it that Julius Caesar had it cut down to facilitate his siege.

Baltic groves date back to 1075 when Adam of Bremen noted Baltic Prussian sacred groves and springs whose sacredness was believed to be polluted by the entry of Christians (solus prohibetur accessus lucorum et fontium, quos autumant pollui christianorum accessu). A few sacred groves in Sambian Peninsula are mentioned in the 14th-century documents of the Teutonic Order (sacra sylva, que Scayte vulgariter nominatur..., silva, quae dicitur Heyligewalt...).

The Celts used sacred groves for performing rituals, based on Celtic mythology. Existence of such groves have been found in Germany, Switzerland, Czech Republic and Hungary in Central Europe, in many sites of ancient Gaul in France, as well as England and Northern Ireland.

== See also ==
- Brush arbour revival – Type of religious meeting
- Bosquet – Concept in landscaping
- List of giant sequoia groves
- National Grove of State Trees
- Sacred grove – Grove of trees of special religious importance to a particular culture
- Sacred trees and groves in Germanic paganism and mythology
- Savannah – Mixed woodland-grassland ecosystem
- Oasis – Fertile area in a desert environment
- Avenue (landscape) – Straight path or road with a line of trees or large shrubs on both sides
