= Shire of Dimboola =

Coordinates: 36°27′S 142°01′E

- Local government area
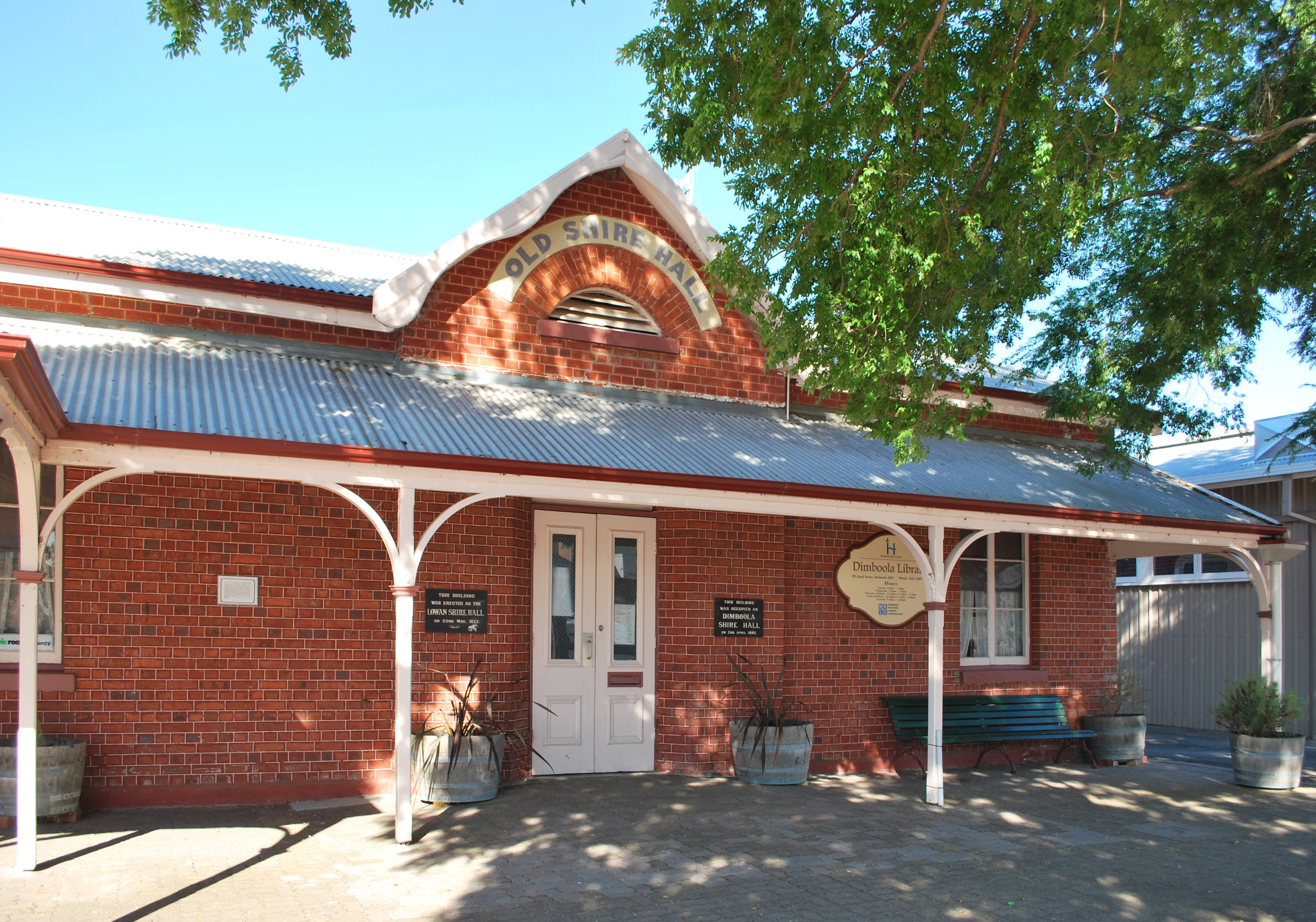
- The former Shire Hall at Dimboola
- The Shire of Dimboola as at its dissolution in 1995
- Country: Australia
- State: Victoria
- Region: Wimmera
- Established: 1885
- Council seat: Jeparit

Area
  - Total: 4,856 km^{2} (1,875 sq mi)

Population
  - Total: 4,280 (1992)
  - Density: 0.8814/km^{2} (2.2828/sq mi)
- County: Lowan, Borung, Karkarooc, Weeah
LGAs around Shire of Dimboola
| Walpeup | Walpeup | Karkarooc |
| Lowan | Shire of Dimboola | Warracknabeal |
| Kowree | Arapiles | Wimmera |

The Shire of Dimboola was a local government area in the Wimmera region of western Victoria, Australia. The shire covered an area of 4,856 square kilometres (1,874.9 sq mi), and existed from 1885 until 1995.

== History ==
Dimboola was originally part of the Shire of Wimmera, which was first incorporated in 1862. It became part of the Shire of Lowan, when it was separately incorporated on 31 December 1875, and on 2 April 1885, Dimboola was established as a shire in its own right.

Being in a fairly remote region, for its first 30 years, Dimboola's boundaries were fairly flexible and adjusted frequently;

- 23 May 1890 – Wimmera annexed Cannum, Wallup and Kewell West, which became Wimmera's North Riding;
- 12 May 1893 – Borung annexed Dimboola's East Riding;
- 28 May 1897 – Karkarooc annexed a northeastern part of Dimboola;
- 1 November 1911 – Dimboola and a number of other western shires gave up remote areas, to form the Shire of Walpeup.

On 14 December 1932, Dimboola gained parts of the West Riding from the Shire of Karkarooc.

On 20 January 1995, the Shire of Dimboola was abolished, and along with the Shire of Lowan, was merged into the newly created Shire of Hindmarsh.

== Wards ==
The Shire of Dimboola was divided into four ridings, each of which elected three councillors:

- North Riding
- Central Riding
- South Riding
- West Riding

== Towns and localities ==
- Antwerp
- Arkona
- Dalmalee
- Dimboola*
- Ellam
- Gerang
- Jeparit
- Kenmare
- Kiata
- Lake Albacutya
- Lake Hindmarsh
- Little Desert NP
- Katyil
- Pella
- Peppers Plains
- Pullut
- Rainbow
- Tarranyurk
- Werrap

* Council seat.

== Population ==
| Year | Population |
|---|---|
| 1954 | 6,224 |
| 1958 | 6,520* |
| 1961 | 6,038 |
| 1966 | 5,892 |
| 1971 | 5,013 |
| 1976 | 4,837 |
| 1981 | 4,790* |
| 1986 | 4,600* |
| 1991 | 4,330 |

* Estimates in 1958, 1983 and 1988 Victorian Year Books.
