= Murra Warra =

Murra Warra Victoria
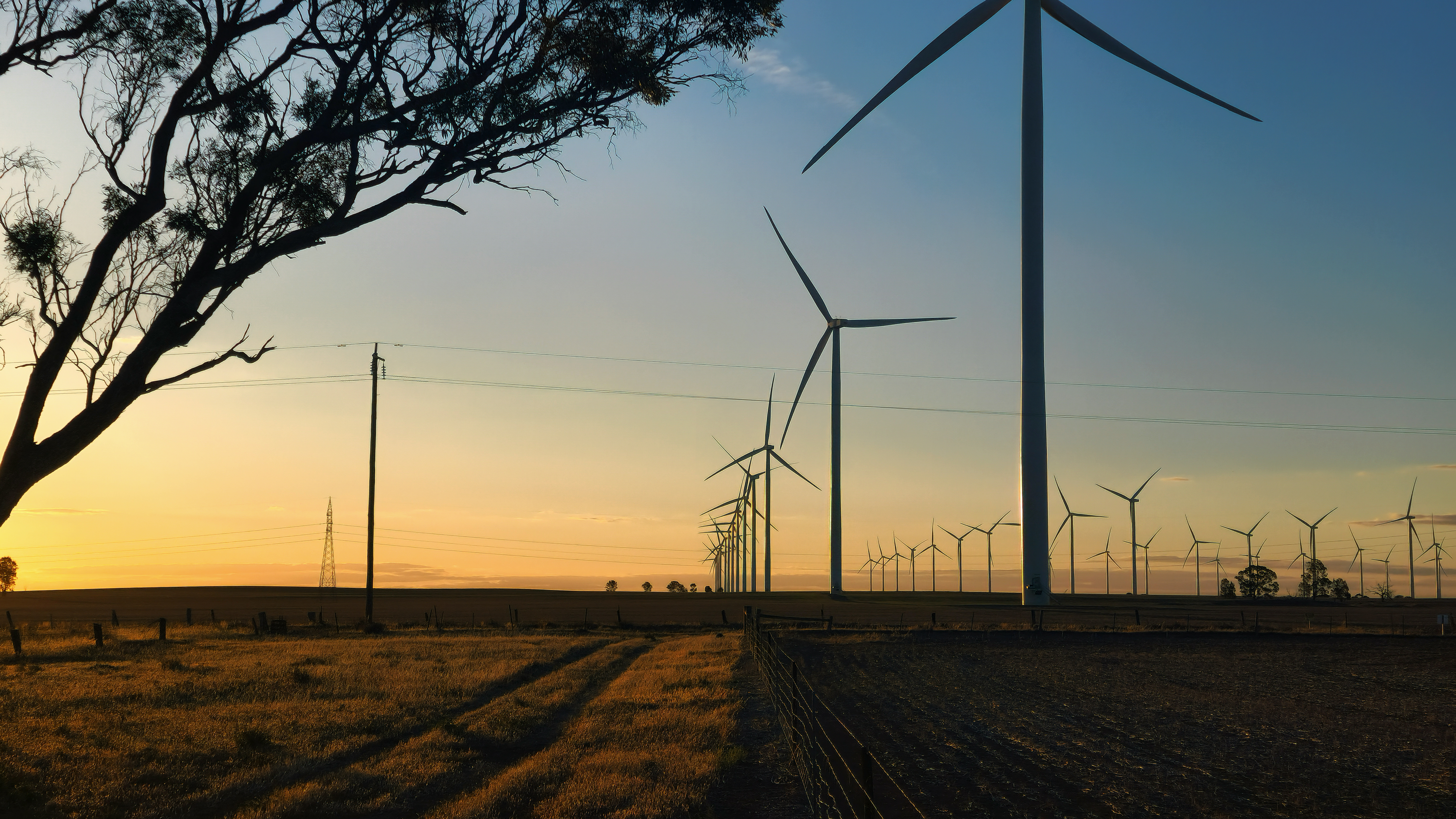
- Photograph of Murra Warra Wind Farm, December 2024

- Coordinates: 36°28′13″S 142°13′14″E
- Population: 63 (2021 census)
- Postcode(s): 3401
- LGA(s): Rural City of Horsham; Shire of Yarriambiack
- State electorate(s): Lowan
- Federal division(s): Mallee

Murra Warra is a locality in the Rural City of Horsham and the Shire of Yarriambiack, Victoria, Australia. At the 2021 census, Murra Warra had a population of 63.

The Murra Warra Wind Farm is located in Murra Warra.

== Gallery ==
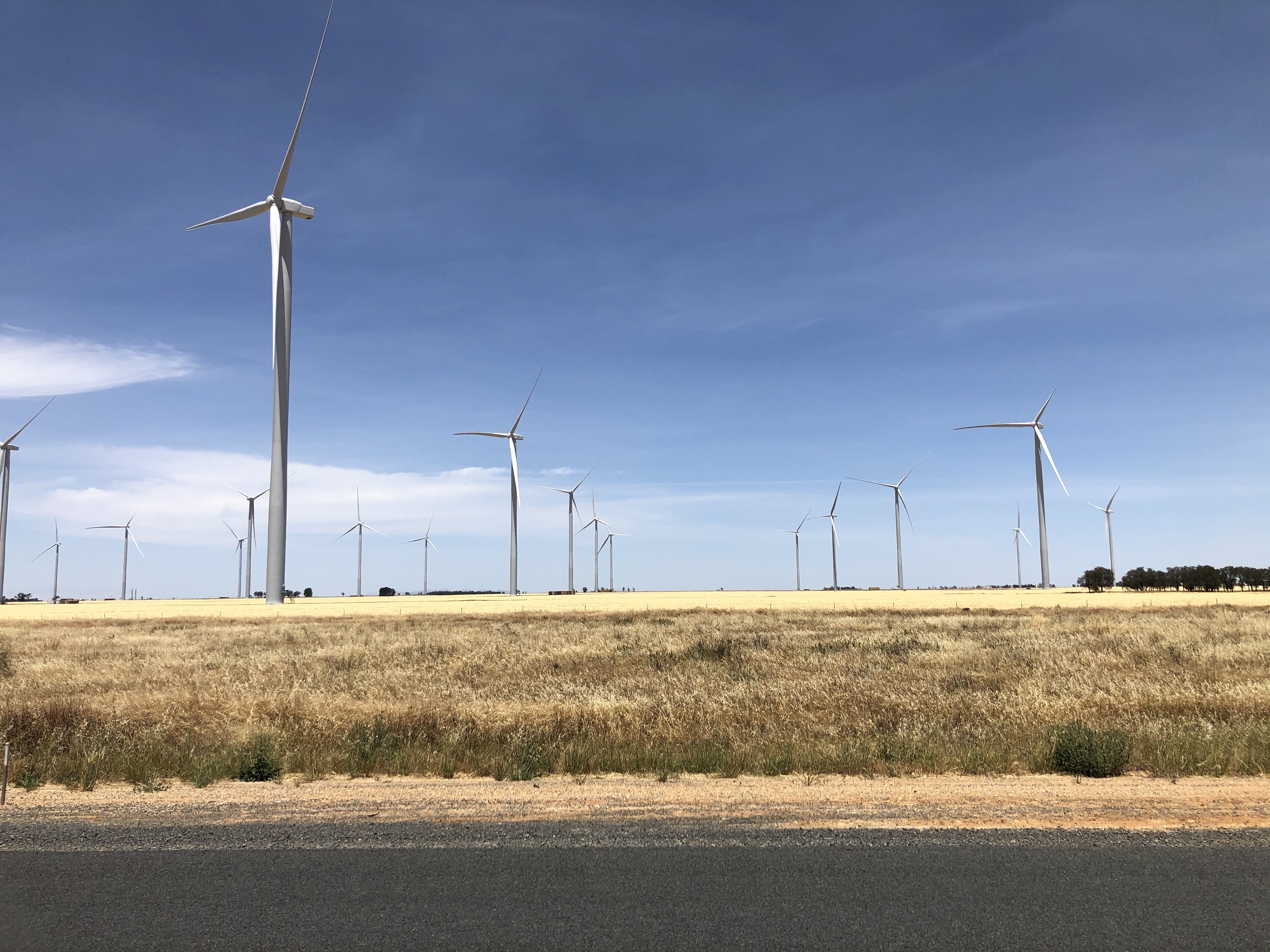
Photograph of Murra Warra Wind Farm, December 2019
