= City of Mildura =

Coordinates: 34°11′S 142°09′E

City of Mildura Victoria
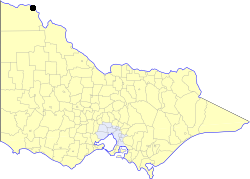
- Location in Victoria
- The City of Mildura as at its dissolution in 1995
- Population: 20,350 (1992)
  - Density: 681.51/km^{2} (1,765.1/sq mi)
- Established: 1920
- Area: 29.86 km^{2} (11.5 sq mi)
- Council seat: Mildura
- Region: Mallee
- County: Karkarooc
LGAs around City of Mildura:
Mildura	City of Mildura	Wentworth (NSW)

The City of Mildura was a local government area on the Murray River, in northwestern Victoria, Australia. The city covered an area of 29.86 square kilometres (11.5 sq mi), and existed from 1920 until 1995.

== History ==
Mildura was initially part of the Swan Hill Road District, which covered basically all of what is now northwestern Victoria. Swan Hill was incorporated on 8 July 1862, and became a shire on 14 August 1871. On 10 January 1890, the Shire of Mildura was incorporated from parts of the Lower Murray Riding.

A new shire, Walpeup, was formed in western Victoria on 1 October 1911, taking in some southern areas of Mildura and sections of five other shires. A small part of the shire in and near Mildura was severed on 18 May 1920, and incorporated as a borough, which became the Town of Mildura on 17 July 1922, and the City of Mildura on 21 March 1934. Parts of the Sandilong and Lake Ridings were annexed to the city on 1 October 1971.

On 20 January 1995, the City of Mildura was abolished, and along with the Shires of Mildura and Walpeup, was merged into the newly created Rural City of Mildura.

=== Wards ===
The City of Mildura was not divided into wards, and its nine councillors represented all electors of the city.

== Population ==
Year	Population
1954	10,972
1958	12,020*
1961	12,270
1966	12,931
1971	14,187
1976	14,417
1981	15,763
1986	18,382
1991	20,432

* Estimate in the 1958 Victorian Year Book.
