= Pimpinio =

- Town
- Coordinates: 36°35′S 142°07′E
- Country: Australia
- State: Victoria
- LGA: Rural City of Horsham
- Established: c.1870

Government
  - State electorate: Lowan
  - Federal division: Mallee

Population
  - Total: 191 (2021 census)
- Postcode: 3401
Localities around Pimpinio
Little Desert	Wail
Duchembegarra	Pimpinio	Kalkee
	Vectis	Dooen

Pimpinio (/pɪmpɪˈnaɪoʊ/ pim-pi-NY-oh) is a town in the Rural City of Horsham, Victoria, Australia. It is 15 km from the City of Horsham and 317 km from the Victorian capital city Melbourne. As of the 2021 Australian census, Pimpinio had a population of 191 people.

== History ==
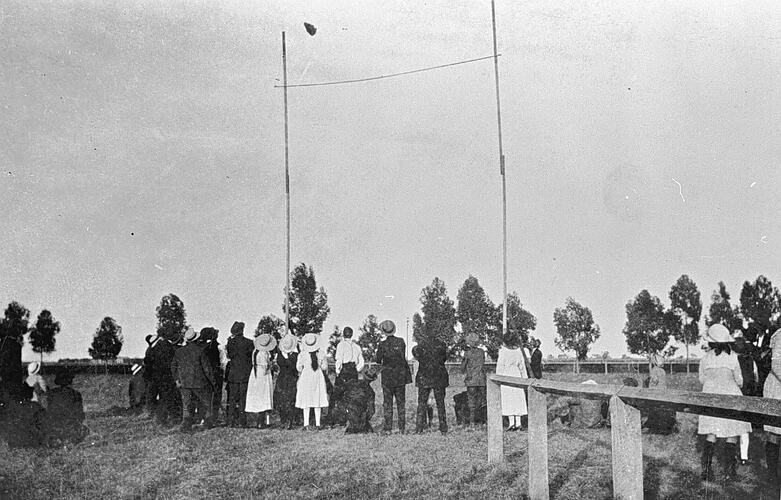
A sheaf tossing competition in Pimpinio, Victoria, Australia, circa 1913

A hotel and blacksmith's forge were established in the Pimpinio area around 1870, and the Pimpinio school opened in 1874 in a Union Church hall. When the railway line from Horsham to Dimboola was extended via Pimpinio, a store was built. Several farms ran small dairy herds and formed a cooperative butter factory that continued until a drought occurred in the late 1890s. Pimpinio's first census data, from 1891, recorded a population of 72.

In the 1903 edition of Australian Handbook, Pimpinio was described as follows:

A postal township, county Borung, electoral district Horsham, shire Wimmera. It is a telegraph and railway station on the Dimboola line, 10 miles north of Horsham and 213 miles from Melbourne, fares 38s. 2d. and 25s. 7d. It has Wesleyan and Anglican churches, mechanics' institute and public library (1,000 vols.), store, blacksmith's shop, butter factory, machinery valued £1,000, and a State school (No. 1,439) - two others in district. Water from Trust dams. Agricultural pursuits are followed in the district. Population about 120.

Pimpinio Post Office opened on 9 March 1875 and closed in 1980. Pimpinio train station opened in 1882 and was disestablished by 1982. Pimpinio school was established in 1874 and closed in 1994.

== Demographics ==
As of 2021, 52.4% of Pimpinio's 191 residents are female and 47.6% are male. The median age is 43. For families with children, there are on average 2.1 children per family. Pimpinio's residents are made up of 53 families living in 82 households, an average of 2.8 people and 3 motor vehicles per household. 92% of dwellings are either owned outright or with a mortgage, with 11% rented.

55% of adult Pimpinio residents are married, 9% are in a de facto relationship, and 36% are unmarried. 34% of Pimpinio residents attend primary school, 25% attend secondary school, and 5% are completing tertiary education. The median weekly household income for Pimpinio residents is $1803, with $867 median monthly mortgage repayments and $175 median weekly rents.

92.1% of current residents were born in Australia, with the most commonly reported ancestry being English, Australian, Irish, Scottish and German. All reported speaking only English at home. 59% of Pimpinio residents report being Christian (Uniting Church, Catholic, and Lutheran denominations), with 37% reporting no religious affiliation. 38% of Pimpinio residents report having at least one chronic health condition.

== Sports and Culture ==
The town has an Australian Rules football team and netball team, the Pimpinio Football Netball Club, competing in the Horsham & District Football League. The club was established in 1890, joined the Horsham & District Football League in 1968, and has won two premierships in 2005 and 2006. Pimpinio also has a cricket team, the Pimpinio Cricket Club, competing in the Horsham Cricket Association. The club were B Grade premiers in 1950–1, 1954–5, 1984–5, and 1993–4. Golfers play at the course of the Pimpinio Golf Club on the Western Highway.

Pimpinio has an Australian Rules football oval and recreation reserve and a Uniting Church. Pimpinio is adjacent to the West Wail Nature Conservation Reserve, which is about 1,455 acres in size and conserves remnant Buloke woodlands and a number of threatened flora species, including Wimmera spider orchids and rigid spider orchids. Pimpinio is also 26 km from Little Desert National Park, a 132,647-hectare (327,780-acre) national park which extends from the Wimmera River in the east to the South Australian border in the west. The park is an important tourist destination receiving about 50,000 visitors each year. Parks Victoria maintains multiple camping sites, walking tracks, look-outs and four-wheel-driving tracks throughout the park.
