= Rural City of Horsham =

Coordinates: 36°50′S 142°05′E

- Local government area
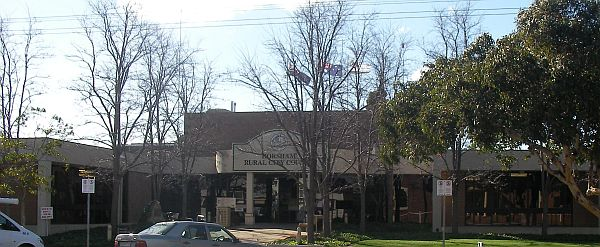
- Municipal offices in Horsham Location in Victoria

- Interactive map of Rural City of Horsham
- Country: Australia
- State: Victoria
- Region: Grampians
- Established: 1995
- Council seat: Horsham

Government
  - Mayor: Cr Brian Klowss
  - State electorate: Lowan
  - Federal division: Mallee

Area
  - Total: 4,267 km^{2} (1,647 sq mi)

Population
  - Total: 19,875 (2018)
  - Density: 4.6578/km^{2} (12.0637/sq mi)
- Gazetted: 20 January 1995
- Website: Rural City of Horsham
LGAs around Rural City of Horsham
Hindmarsh	Hindmarsh	Yarriambiack
West Wimmera	Rural City of Horsham	Northern Grampians
Southern Grampians	Southern Grampians	Northern Grampians

The Rural City of Horsham is a local government area in Victoria, Australia, located in the western part of the state. It covers an area of 4,267 square kilometres (1,647 mi^{2}) and in June 2018, had a population of 19,875. It includes the towns of Brimpaen, Dadswells Bridge, Dooen, Haven, Horsham, Laharum, Natimuk, Noradjuha and Pimpinio.

The Rural City is governed and administered by the Horsham Rural City Council; its seat of local government and administrative centre is located at the council headquarters in Horsham. The Rural City is named after the main urban settlement located in the north-east of the LGA, that is Horsham, which is also the LGA's most populous urban centre with a population of 16,514.

The region is the site of lakes and the Wimmera River system and in normal seasons is popular with fishing, boating, swimming and water enthusiasts.

== Traditional owners ==
There are multiple traditional owners of this land, the Jaadwa, Jadawadjali, Jupagulk, Wergaia and Wotjobaluk people.

== History ==
The Rural City of Horsham was formed in 1995 by the amalgamation of the City of Horsham, most of the Shire of Wimmera and Shire of Arapiles, and part of the Shire of Kowree.

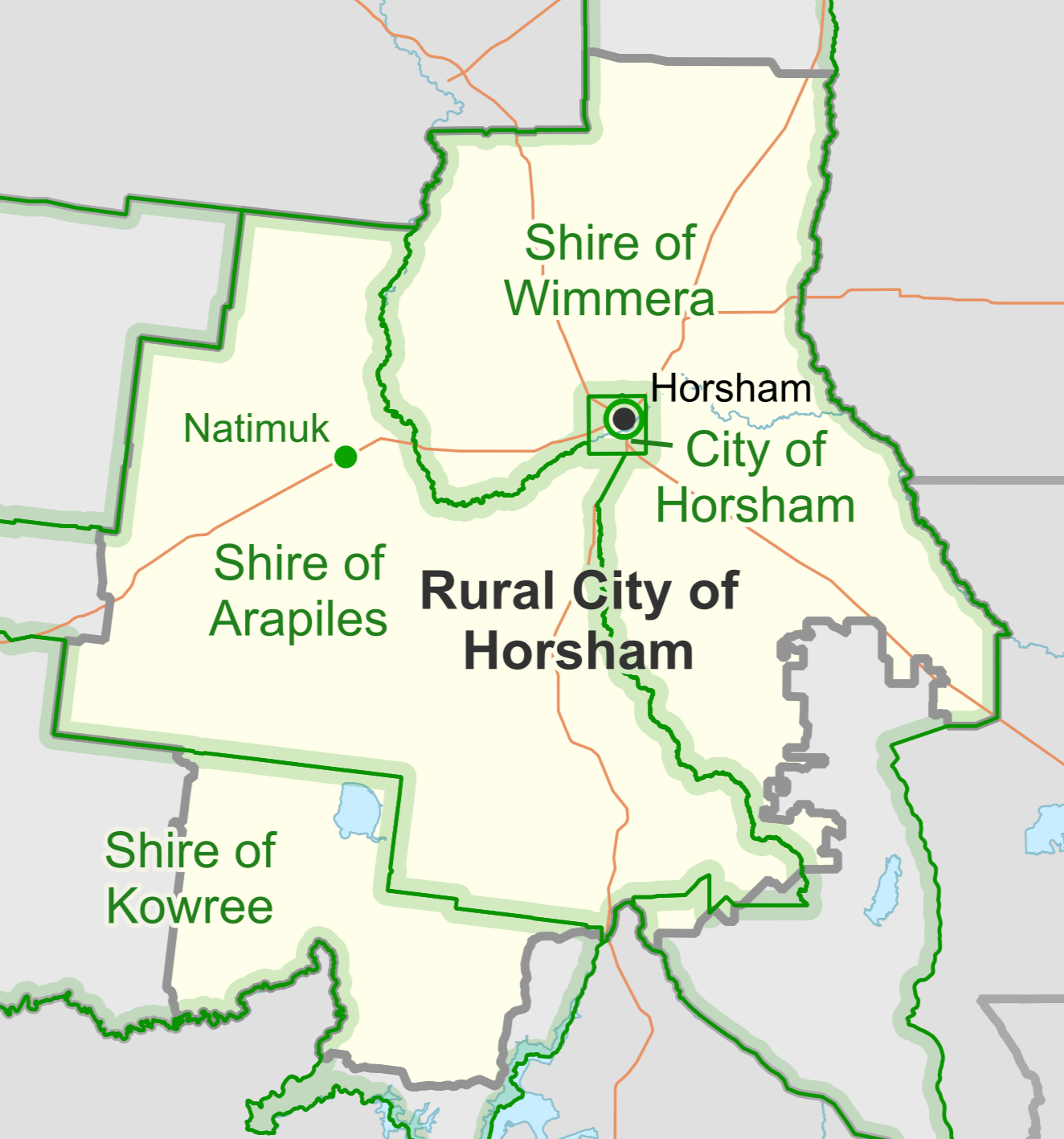
The Rural City of Horsham's predecessor LGAs (green) as they were in 1994. The administrative centres of the former LGAs are marked by green dots.

== Council ==
=== Current composition ===
The council is composed of seven councillors elected to represent an unsubdivided municipality. The current councillors, in order of election at the 2024 election, are:

Ward	Party	Councillor	Notes
Green Park	Independent	Dean O'Loughlin	
Horsham North	Independent	Todd C. Wilson	
Kalimna	Independent	Rebecca Sluggett	
May Park	Independent	Cam McDonald	
Oatlands	Independent	Angela Munn	
Pine Lake	Independent	Ian Ross	
Wyn Wyn	Independent	Brian Klowss	Mayor

=== Administration and governance ===
The council meets in the council chambers at the council headquarters in the Horsham Civic Centre, which is also the location of the council's administrative activities. It also provides customer services at its administrative centre in Horsham.

== Townships and localities ==
The 2021 census, the rural city had a population of 20,429 up from 19,642 in the 2016 census

Population
Locality	2016	2021
Arapiles	*	#
Blackheath	*	#
Brimpaen^	79	80
Bungalally	95	93
Clear Lake	78	57
Dadswells Bridge^	71	69
Dooen	240	250
Douglas^	65	74
Drung	147	119
Duchembegarra	38	47
Grass Flat^	*	#
Haven	1,304	1,443
Horsham	14,543	15,134
Jilpander	*	#
Jung^	241	#
Kalkee	52	48
Kanagulk	18	28
Kewell^	48	57
Laharum^	196	162
Longerenong^	*	237
Lower Norton	231	236
McKenzie Creek	136	140
Mitre^	69	66
Mockinya	33	30
Murra Warra^	72	63
Natimuk	514	548
Noradjuha	83	89
Nurrabiel	61	43
Pimpinio	184	191
Quantong	310	354
Riverside	276	287
St Helens Plains	42	40
Telangatuk East	65	75
Tooan	19	23
Toolondo	59	74
Vectis	179	184
Wail	42	44
Wartook^	84	88
Wonwondah	103	114

^ - Territory divided with another LGA
* - Not noted in 2016 Census
# - Not noted in 2021 Census

== See also ==
- List of places of worship in the Rural City of Horsham
- List of places on the Victorian Heritage Register in the Rural City of Horsham
- Wotjobaluk, Jaadwa, Jadawadjali, Wergaia and Jupagulk Peoples v Victoria
