= Kanagulk =

- Town
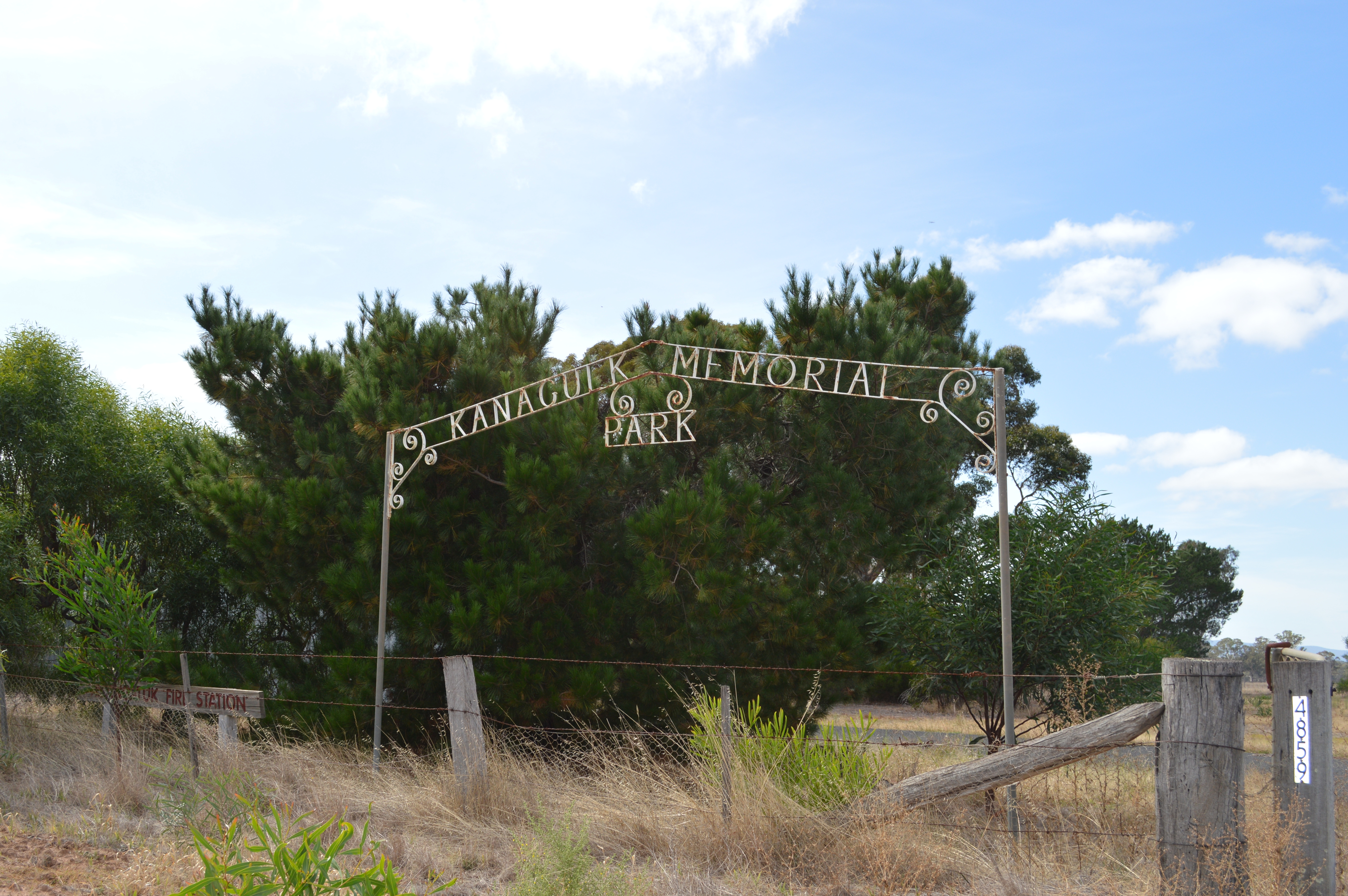
- Kanagulk Memorial Park

- Coordinates: 37°7′52″S 141°50′50″E
- Country: Australia
- State: Victoria
- LGA: Rural City of Horsham
- Location: 384 km (239 mi) WNW of Melbourne; 70 km (43 mi) SW of Horsham; 14 km (8.7 mi) N of Balmoral

Government
  - State electorate: Lowan
  - Federal division: Mallee

Population
  - Total: 18 (2016 census)
- Postcode: 3401

Kanagulk is a locality in western Victoria, Australia. The locality is in the Rural City of Horsham local government area, 384 kilometres (239 mi) west north west of the state capital, Melbourne.

At the 2016 census, Kanagulk had a population of 18.

Lake Kanagulk is a designated wildlife reserve under the management of Parks Victoria.

A Bureau of Meteorology weather station has been placed in Kanagulk.

There have been concerns about contamination from mining refuse dumping at Kanagulk. Iluka Resources used Kanagulk to store by-products from its Hamilton processing plant. There has been opposition from local community groups over fears of radon gas levels and water contamination. The application to continue dumping at Kanagulk was rejected by Horsham Council in 2016 after Kanagulk Lancare Group found concerning levels of radon gas at the site.

== Climate ==
Climate data for Kanagulk, elevation 189 m (620 ft), (2004–2024)
Month	Jan	Feb	Mar	Apr	May	Jun	Jul	Aug	Sep	Oct	Nov	Dec	Year
Record high °C (°F)	44.8 (112.6)	45.5 (113.9)	40.6 (105.1)	36.8 (98.2)	26.2 (79.2)	23.9 (75.0)	19.3 (66.7)	23.6 (74.5)	29.4 (84.9)	35.9 (96.6)	41.3 (106.3)	46.8 (116.2)	46.8 (116.2)
Mean daily maximum °C (°F)	29.8 (85.6)	28.6 (83.5)	25.9 (78.6)	21.2 (70.2)	16.6 (61.9)	13.6 (56.5)	12.9 (55.2)	14.2 (57.6)	16.6 (61.9)	20.2 (68.4)	24.0 (75.2)	27.1 (80.8)	20.9 (69.6)
Mean daily minimum °C (°F)	13.0 (55.4)	12.6 (54.7)	11.1 (52.0)	8.4 (47.1)	6.3 (43.3)	4.5 (40.1)	4.3 (39.7)	4.5 (40.1)	5.6 (42.1)	6.8 (44.2)	9.2 (48.6)	10.7 (51.3)	8.1 (46.6)
Record low °C (°F)	4.4 (39.9)	4.6 (40.3)	1.7 (35.1)	−0.9 (30.4)	−4.0 (24.8)	−3.5 (25.7)	−3.5 (25.7)	−2.7 (27.1)	−2.9 (26.8)	−1.5 (29.3)	0.0 (32.0)	2.7 (36.9)	−4.0 (24.8)
Average rainfall mm (inches)	35.6 (1.40)	16.8 (0.66)	22.7 (0.89)	34.5 (1.36)	42.0 (1.65)	55.1 (2.17)	62.3 (2.45)	65.9 (2.59)	44.4 (1.75)	37.5 (1.48)	36.0 (1.42)	40.3 (1.59)	494.9 (19.48)
Average rainy days (≥ 1.0 mm)	3.6	2.5	4.1	5.6	8.4	10.0	12.3	12.7	9.1	6.7	5.2	5.2	85.4
Source: Australian Bureau of Meteorology
