= Laharum =

Laharum Victoria
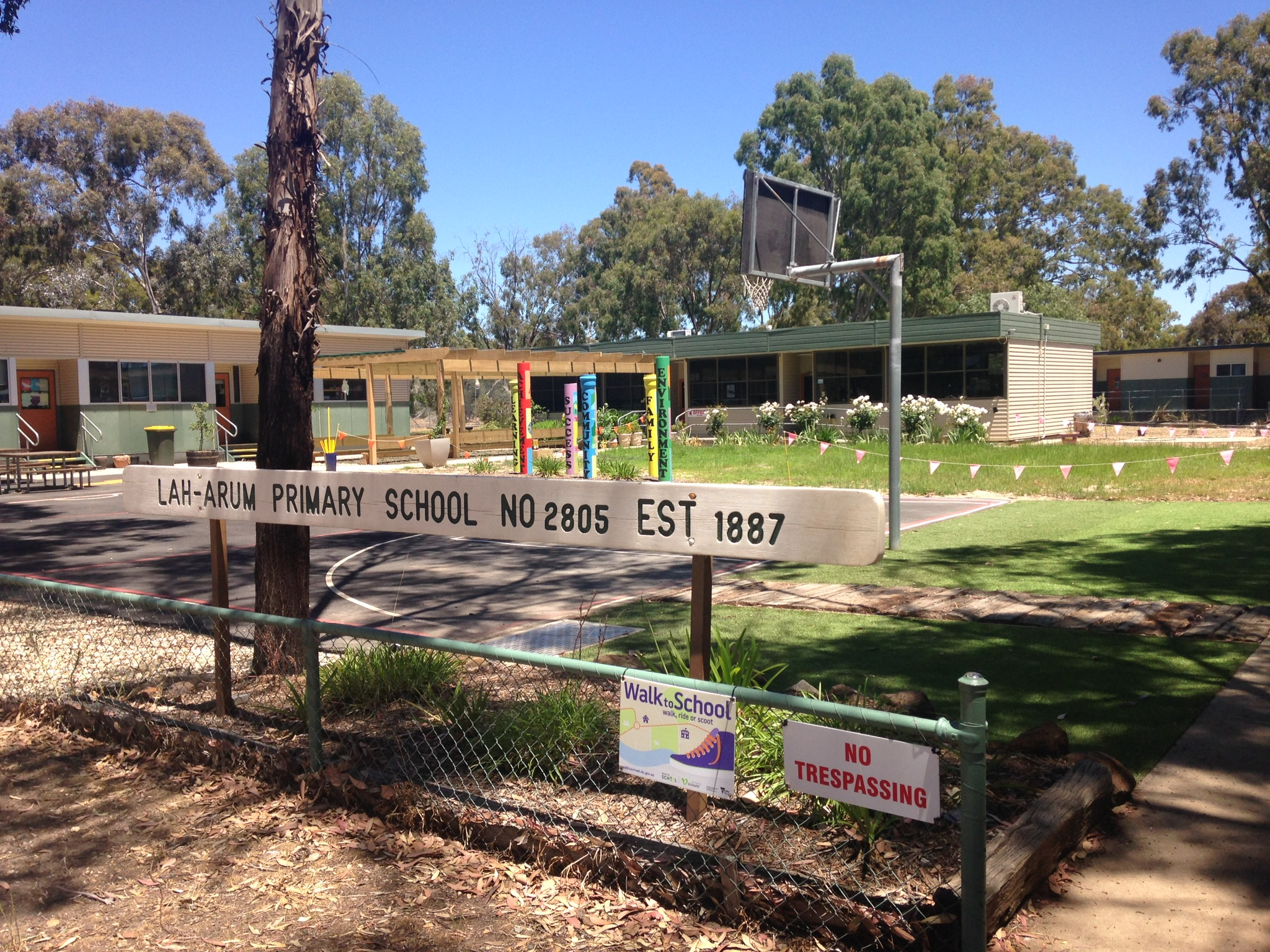
- Laharum Primary School, 2016

- Coordinates: 36°56′43″S 142°19′21″E
- Population: 196 (2016 census)
- Postcode(s): 3401
- Location: 291 km (181 mi) WNW of Melbourne; 33 km (21 mi) SE of Horsham
- LGA(s): Rural City of Horsham
- State electorate(s): Lowan
- Federal division(s): Mallee

Laharum is a locality in western Victoria, Australia. The locality is in the Rural City of Horsham local government area, 291 kilometres (181 mi) west north west of the state capital, Melbourne.

At the 2016 census, Laharum had a population of 196.
