= Sunnycliffs =

- Town
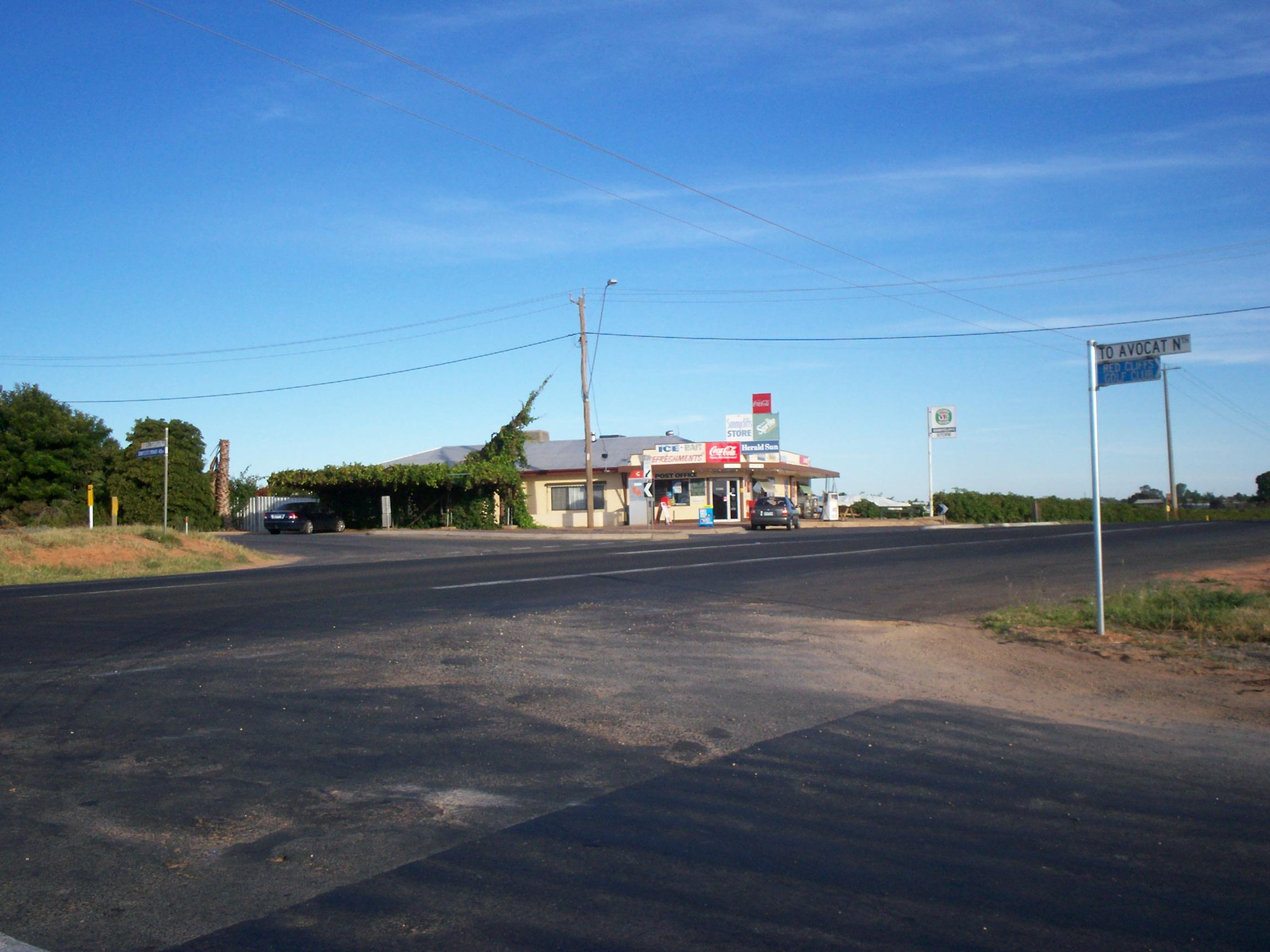
- Sunnycliffs General Store

- Coordinates: 34°17′15″S 142°11′31″E
- Country: Australia
- State: Victoria
- Region: Sunraysia
- LGA: Rural City of Mildura
- Location: 531 km (330 mi) from Melbourne; 15 km (9.3 mi) from Mildura; 89 km (55 mi) from Ouyen; 3 km (1.9 mi) from Red Cliffs

Government
  - State electorate: Mildura
  - Federal division: Mallee
- Postcode: 3496

Sunnycliffs is a locality situated in the Sunraysia region in north western Victoria, Australia. The area is predominantly devoted to grape production.
