= Shire of Arapiles =

Coordinates: 36°45′S 141°57′E

Shire of Arapiles Victoria
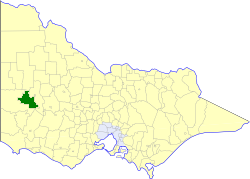
- Location in Victoria
- The Shire of Arapiles as at its dissolution in 1995
- Population: 1,930 (1992)
  - Density: 0.8239/km^{2} (2.134/sq mi)
- Established: 1888
- Area: 2,342.62 km^{2} (904.5 sq mi)
- Council seat: Natimuk
- Region: Wimmera
- County: Borung, Lowan
LGAs around Shire of Arapiles:
Dimboola	Dimboola	Wimmera
Kowree	Shire of Arapiles	Wimmera
Kowree	Kowree	Dundas

The Shire of Arapiles was a local government area in the Wimmera region of western Victoria, Australia. The shire covered an area of 2,342.62 square kilometres (904.5 sq mi), and existed from 1888 until 1995.

== History ==
Arapiles was initially the West Riding of the Shire of Wimmera, as incorporated in 1862. It was severed and incorporated separately on 25 May 1888. It gained parts of Wimmera's South Riding on 30 May 1913. The council met at Noradjuha until 1952, when the shire offices were moved to Natimuk on the back of a low loader.

On 20 January 1995, the Shire of Arapiles was abolished, and along with the City of Horsham and parts of the Shires of Kowree and Wimmera, was merged into the newly created Rural City of Horsham. The section west of Nhill-Harrow Road was transferred to the newly created Shire of West Wimmera.

== Wards ==
The Shire of Arapiles was divided into three ridings, each of which elected three councillors:

- North Riding
- Central Riding
- South Riding

== Towns and localities ==
- Clear Lake
- Connangorach
- Duchembegarra
- Grass Flat
- Jallumba
- Lower Norton
- Mitre
- Mockinya
- Mount Arapiles
- Natimuk*
- Noradjuha
- Nurrabiel
- Tooan

* Council seat.

== Population ==
Year	Population
1954	2,160
1958	2,240*
1961	2,133
1966	2,141
1971	1,926
1976	1,825
1981	1,880*
1986	1,800*
1991	1,950

* Estimates in 1958, 1983 and 1988 Victorian Year Books.
