= Shire of Walpeup =

- Local government area
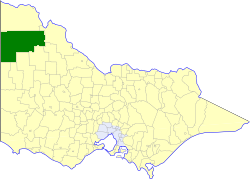
- Location in Victoria
- The Shire of Walpeup as at its dissolution in 1995
- Country: Australia
- State: Victoria
- Region: Mallee
- Established: 1911
- Council seat: Ouyen

Area
  - Total: 10,964 km^{2} (4,233 sq mi)

Population
  - Total: 3,310 (1992)
  - Density: 0.3019/km^{2} (0.7819/sq mi)
- County: Karkarooc, Millewa, Weeah
LGAs around Shire of Walpeup
| Loxton (SA) | Mildura | Swan Hill |
| Pinnaroo (SA) | Shire of Walpeup | Swan Hill; Wycheproof |
| Kaniva; Lowan | Dimboola | Karkarooc |

The Shire of Walpeup was a local government area in northwestern Victoria, Australia, along the South Australian border. The shire covered an area of 10,964 square kilometres (4,233.2 sq mi), and existed from 1911 until 1995.

== History ==
Walpeup was incorporated as a shire on 1 November 1911, created out of parts of the Shires of Mildura, Swan Hill, Lawloit, Lowan, Dimboola and Karkarooc.

On 20 January 1995, the Shire of Walpeup was abolished, and along with the City of Mildura and the Shire of Mildura, was merged into the newly created Rural City of Mildura.

== Ridings ==
The Shire of Walpeup was divided into four ridings in 1986, each of which elected three councillors:

- Ouyen East Riding
- Ouyen West Riding
- Walpeup/Underbool Riding
- Murrayville Riding

== Towns and localities ==
- Big Desert
- Cowangie
- Kattyoong
- Kiamal
- Koonda
- Kulwin
- Mittyack
- Murrayville
- Murray-Sunset (shared with the Shire of Mildura)
- Ngallo
- Ouyen*
- Panitya
- Tiega
- Underbool
- Walpeup
- Wyperfeld National Park (shared with the Shire of Dimboola)

* Council seat.

== Population ==
| Year | Population |
|---|---|
| 1954 | 4,310 |
| 1958 | 4,480* |
| 1961 | 4,548 |
| 1966 | 4,429 |
| 1971 | 3,964 |
| 1976 | 3,846 |
| 1981 | 3,594 |
| 1986 | 3,496 |
| 1991 | 3,237 |

* Estimate in the 1958 Victorian Year Book.
