= Shire of Kowree =

Coordinates: 37°03′S 141°18′E

- Local government area
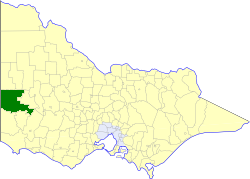
- Location in Victoria
- The Shire of Kowree as at its dissolution in 1995
- Country: Australia
- State: Victoria
- Region: Wimmera
- Established: 1862
- Council seat: Edenhope

Area
  - Total: 5,379.41 km^{2} (2,077.00 sq mi)

Population
  - Total: 3,710 (1992)
  - Density: 0.6897/km^{2} (1.7862/sq mi)
- County: Lowan
LGAs around Shire of Kowree
| Tatiara (SA) | Kaniva | Lowan |
| Naracoorte (SA) | Shire of Kowree | Arapiles |
| Naracoorte (SA) | Glenelg; Wannon | Dundas |

The Shire of Kowree was a local government area in western Victoria, Australia. The shire covered an area of 5,379.41 square kilometres (2,077.0 sq mi), and existed from 1862 until 1995.

== History ==
Kowree was first incorporated as a road district on 24 June 1862, and became a shire on 26 January 1872. It annexed the South Riding of the Shire of Lowan on 29 May 1894, which was added to its North Riding.

On 20 January 1995, the Shire of Kowree was abolished, and along with the Shire of Kaniva and parts of the Shires of Arapiles and Glenelg, was merged into the newly created Shire of West Wimmera. The Black Range and Toolondo Reservoir districts were transferred to the newly created Rural City of Horsham, while a small unpopulated section was transferred to the Shire of Southern Grampians, created earlier in September 1994.

== Wards ==
The Shire of Kowree was divided into four ridings, each of which elected three councillors:

- Central Riding
- East Riding
- North Riding
- West Riding

== Towns and localities ==
- Apsley
- Bringalbert
- Douglas
- Edenhope*
- Goroke
- Gymbowen
- Harrow
- Minimay
- Rocklands
- Toolondo
- Wombelano

* Council seat.

== Population ==
| Year | Population |
|---|---|
| 1954 | 5,012 |
| 1958 | 5,400* |
| 1961 | 5,426 |
| 1966 | 5,358 |
| 1971 | 4,795 |
| 1976 | 4,820 |
| 1981 | 4,150* |
| 1986 | 4,000* |
| 1991 | 3,720 |

* Estimates in 1958, 1983 and 1988 Victorian Year Books.
