= Toolondo =

Toolondo Victoria
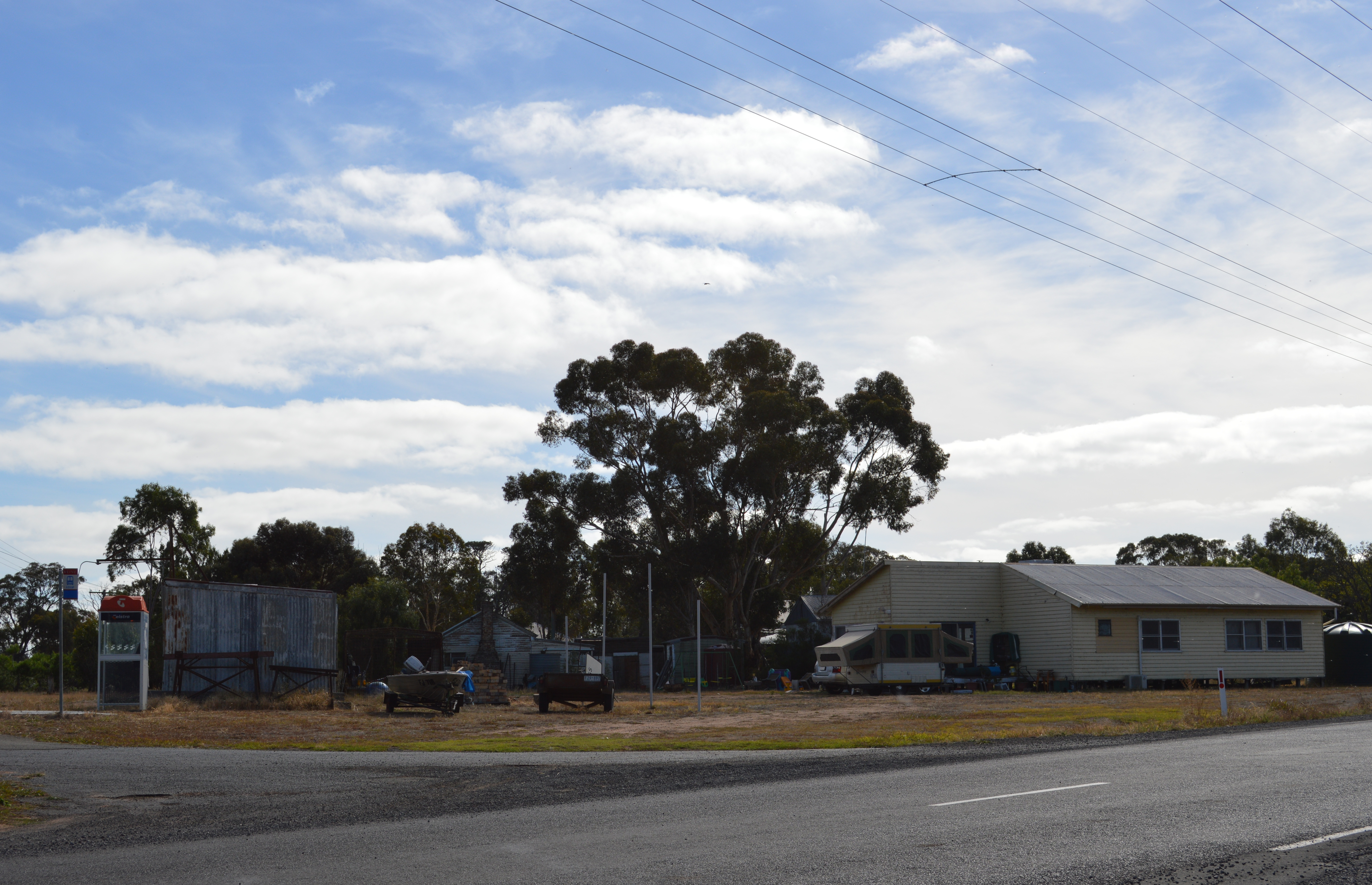
- Toolondo, 2015

- Coordinates: 36°59′34″S 141°56′11″E
- Population: 59 (2016 census)
- Postcode(s): 3401
- Location: 325 km (202 mi) WNW of Melbourne; 44 km (27 mi) SW of Horsham; 34 km (21 mi) N of Balmoral
- LGA(s): Rural City of Horsham
- State electorate(s): Lowan
- Federal division(s): Mallee

Toolondo is a locality in western Victoria, Australia. The locality is in the Rural City of Horsham local government area, 325 kilometres (202 mi) west north west of the state capital, Melbourne. Toolondo Reservoir is located in Toolando. At the 2016 census, Toolondo had a population of 59.

== Gallery ==
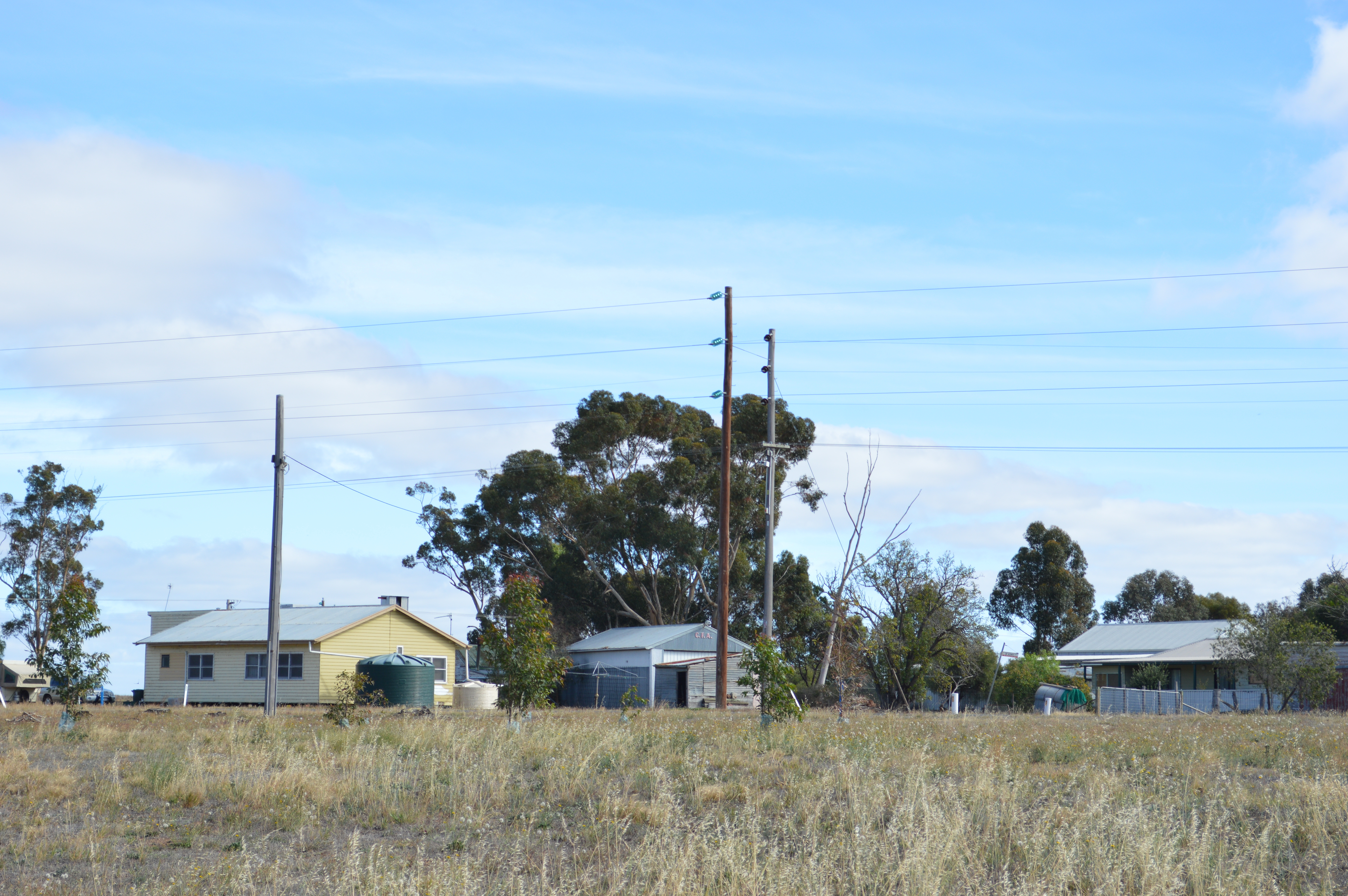

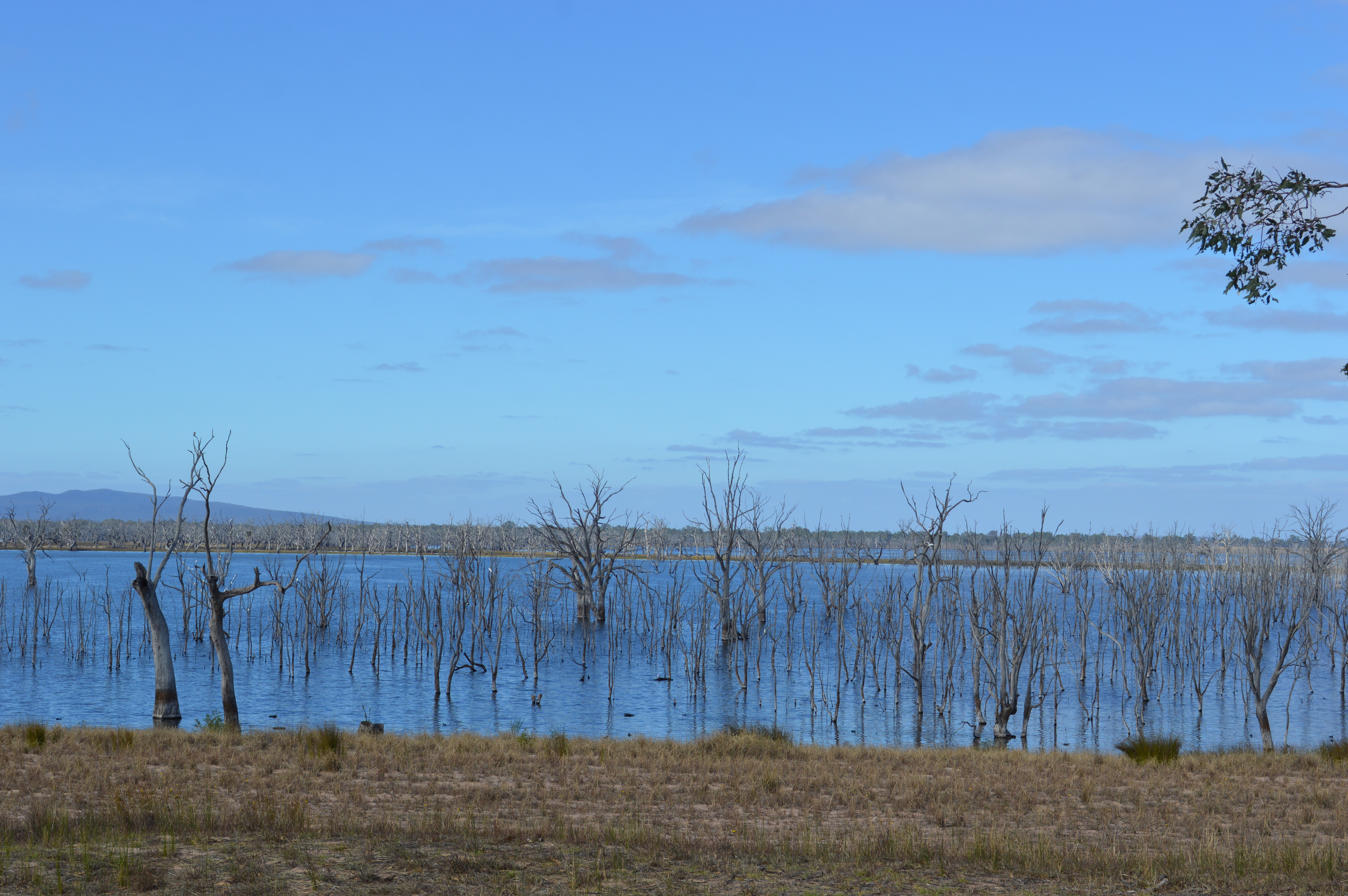

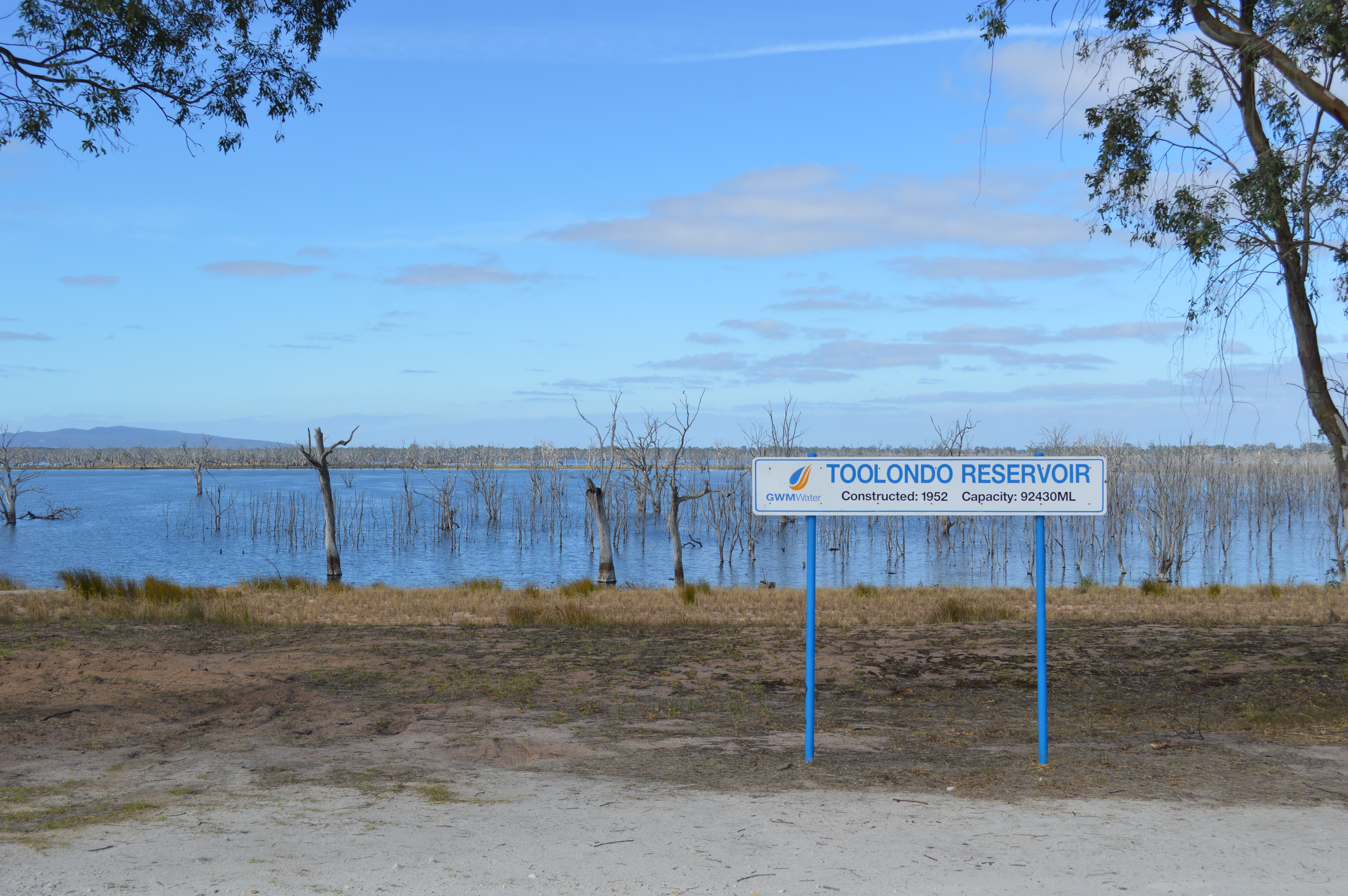

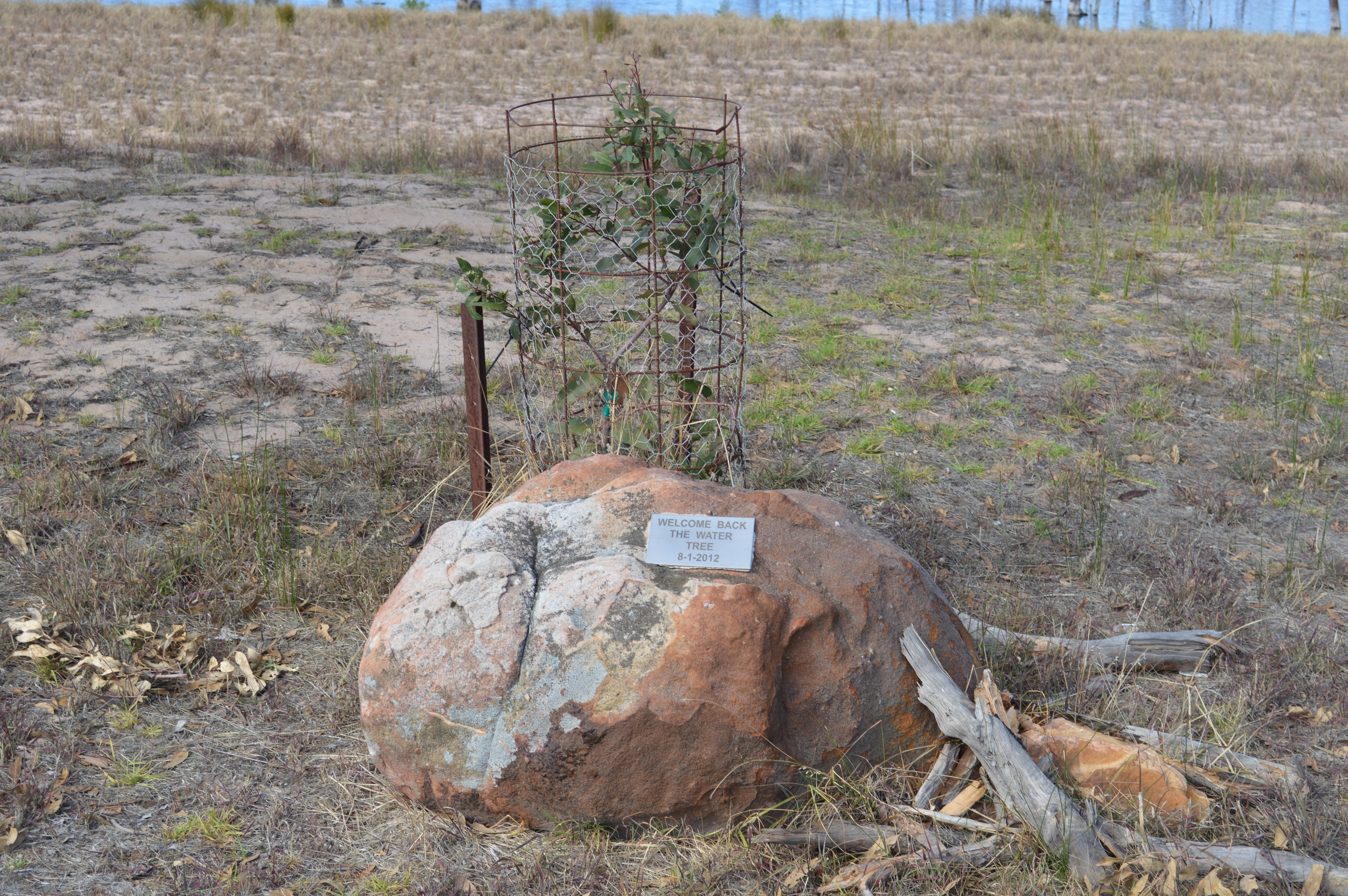
