= Kalkee =

Kalkee Victoria
- Coordinates: 36°33′0″S 142°13′0″E
- Population: 48 (SAL 2021)
- Postcode(s): 3401
- Location: 317 km (197 mi) NW of Melbourne; 17 km (11 mi) N of Horsham
- LGA(s): Rural City of Horsham
- State electorate(s): Lowan
- Federal division(s): Mallee

Kalkee is a locality in the Wimmera region of Victoria, Australia. Kalkee is located on the Blue Ribbon Road, 319 kilometres (198 mi) north west of the state capital, Melbourne and 17 kilometres (11 mi) north of the regional centre of Horsham.

The area consists of flat cropping and grazing farmland. Kalkee has an Australian Rules football team and a netball team. Cricket and tennis are also played at the Kalkee Recreation Reserve. The adjacent Blue Ribbon Speedway holds motorsports events attracting crowds from the entire Wimmera region. Kalkee once had a Primitive Methodist church and a primary school but have since closed due to a lack of population.
