= Dadswells Bridge =

Dadswells Bridge Victoria
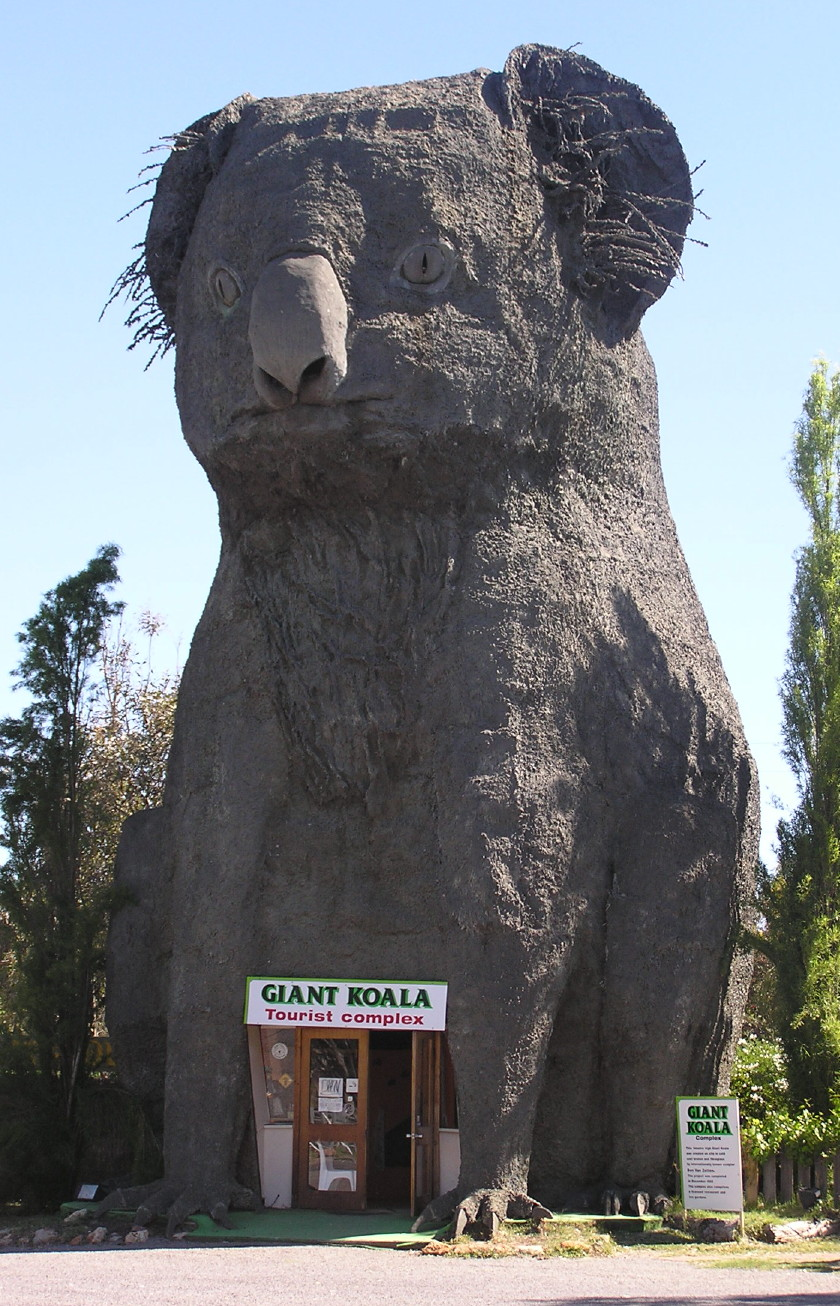
- The Giant Koala at Dadswells Bridge

- Coordinates: 36°54′57″S 142°30′40″E
- Population: 69 (2021 census)
- Postcode(s): 3385
- Location: 265 km (165 mi) NW of Melbourne; 37 km (23 mi) SE of Horsham; 30 km (19 mi) NW of Stawell
- LGA(s): Rural City of Horsham; Shire of Northern Grampians
- Federal division(s): Mallee; Wannon

Dadswells Bridge is a locality in the Rural City of Horsham and the Shire of Northern Grampians, Victoria, Australia. It is located along the Western Highway in the Wimmera region. At the 2021 census, Dadswells Bridge had a population of 69.

The locality has been threatened by major bushfires and grassfires, most recently in 2010, 2014, and 2024
