= Natimuk =

- Town
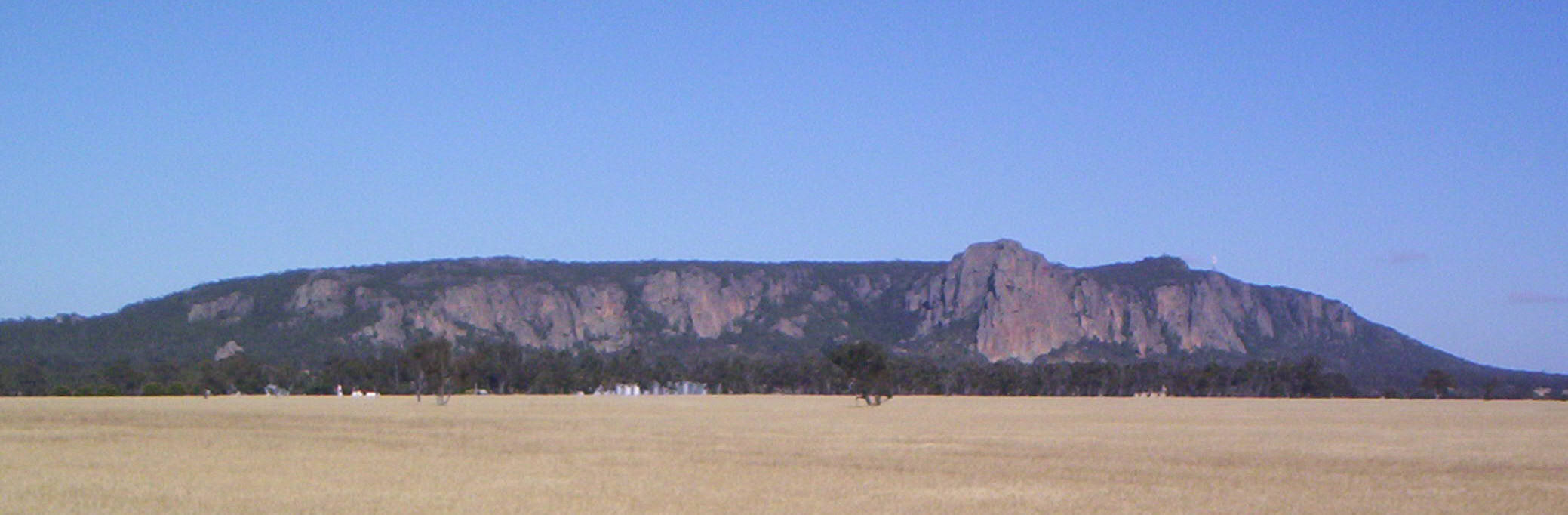
- Mount Arapiles

- Coordinates: 36°45′S 141°57′E
- Country: Australia
- State: Victoria
- LGA: Rural City of Horsham
- Location: 328 km (204 mi) NW of Melbourne; 27 km (17 mi) W of Horsham

Government
  - State electorate: Lowan
  - Federal division: Mallee

Population
  - Total: 421 (UCL 2021)
- Postcode: 3409

Natimuk is a town in Western Victoria, Australia, located about 300 kilometres (190 mi) northwest of Melbourne. A further 10 km (6.2 mi) west of Natimuk is one of Australia's best climbing areas, Mount Arapiles. In the 2021 census, the population was recorded as 421.

== History ==
The local post office opened as "Natimuk Creek" on 1 July 1874 and was renamed "Natimuk" in 1884.

A railway line, built in a number of sections, once connected Horsham and Hamilton, running via Cavendish, Balmoral and East Natimuk until their closures in 1986 and 1988.

The Natimuk Court of Petty Sessions closed in 1965, with the former courthouse subsequently being used by the local historical society.

In 2004 Natimuk hosted 10000 people for Triple J's One Night Stand.

On 9 January 2026, a fast-moving grassfire that started in catastrophic fire danger weather conditions at Grass Flat burnt through 8,000 ha (20,000 acres) of land around Natimuk, and destroyed 17 homes.

== Description ==
Natimuk located about 300 kilometres (190 mi) northwest of Melbourne.

The town has traditionally survived as a rural service centre for the surrounding grain and sheep farming community. It has diversified into tourism and staved off the decline common in other Wimmera towns.

People from all over the world flock to Natimuk because of the rock climbing at Mount Arapiles, located 10 km (6.2 mi) west of Natimuk, and the nearby Grampians.

== Demographics ==
In the 2021 census, the population of Natimuk was recorded as 421, of whom 54.8% were female. The median age was 55.

Natimuk's arts-friendly focus has attracted and supported artists from nearby regions or urban areas to settle in the town.

== Sport ==
The town has traditionally had strong Netball teams - The Ewes. Natimuk also fields three or four Australian Rules teams who compete in the Horsham & District Football League.

Golfers play at the course of the Natimuk Golf Club at Mount Arapiles State Park.

There is also a lawn bowls club, tennis club, cricket club, and gymnastics club].

== Environment ==
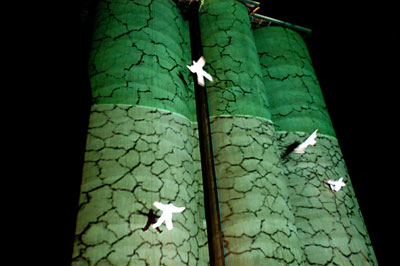
One of the events at the Nati Frinj

There are many small wetlands in the district, and the town lies close to the Natimuk-Douglas Wetlands Important Bird Area, so identified by BirdLife International because of its importance for a variety of waterbirds.

== Events ==
Nati Frinj is hosted in the first weekend of November during each odd-numbered year in town. The festival includes music, food, visual art, performances, and various other events.

Around 60 rock climbers (locally known as goats) have made Natimuk their home due to the climbing and lifestyle. As of 2016Natimuk also hosts Goatfest, an annual climbing film festival, which coincides with the influx of climbers over the Easter holidays.

== Notable residents ==
Harrie Wade, later a Country Party senator for Victoria and federal government minister, was the founding president of the Natimuk Bush Fire Brigade and unsuccessfully promoted an irrigation scheme for Natimuk Lake in the 1940s.
